= Ammassalik Municipality =

Former municipality in Greenland

Ammassalik was one of two municipalities in Tunu, the former county of East Greenland − the other one being Ittoqqortoormiit (further north). It was located in southeastern Greenland, and with an area of 232,100 km^{2}, most of it on the ice sheet, it was the largest municipality of East Greenland. It is now mostly part of the new Sermersooq municipality, except for the uninhabited area from Timmiarmiit southwards, which is part of the new Kujalleq municipality. The population was 3,031 on 1 January 2005. Due to its size, the old municipality bordered more municipalities than any other in Greenland (10):

- Nanortalik (south)
- Narsaq (west)
- Qaqortoq (west)
- Paamiut (west)
- Maniitsoq (west)
- Sisimiut (west)
- Kangaatsiaq (west)
- Qasigiannguit (west)
- Nuuk (west)
- Ittoqqortoormiit (north)

For the most part, the old municipality boundaries were laid out as straight lines on the ice cap, such as the 44°W line of longitude (the western border), and 69°N circle of latitude (the northern border). In the east, it borders on the Irminger Sea, a marginal sea of the North Atlantic Ocean, and the Denmark Strait. The former capital is Tasiilaq, pop. 1,849, located on the Ammassalik Island. Other settlements within its borders are Ikkatteq (now abandoned), Kuummiit, Kulusuk, Tiilerilaaq, Sermiligaaq and Isertoq. Ammassalik was also the home to the Arctic Team Challenge, an adventure race.

== See also ==
- Ammassalik wooden maps
