= Tasiilaq =

Town in Greenland

Tasiilaq Ammassalik, Oscarshavn
- Town
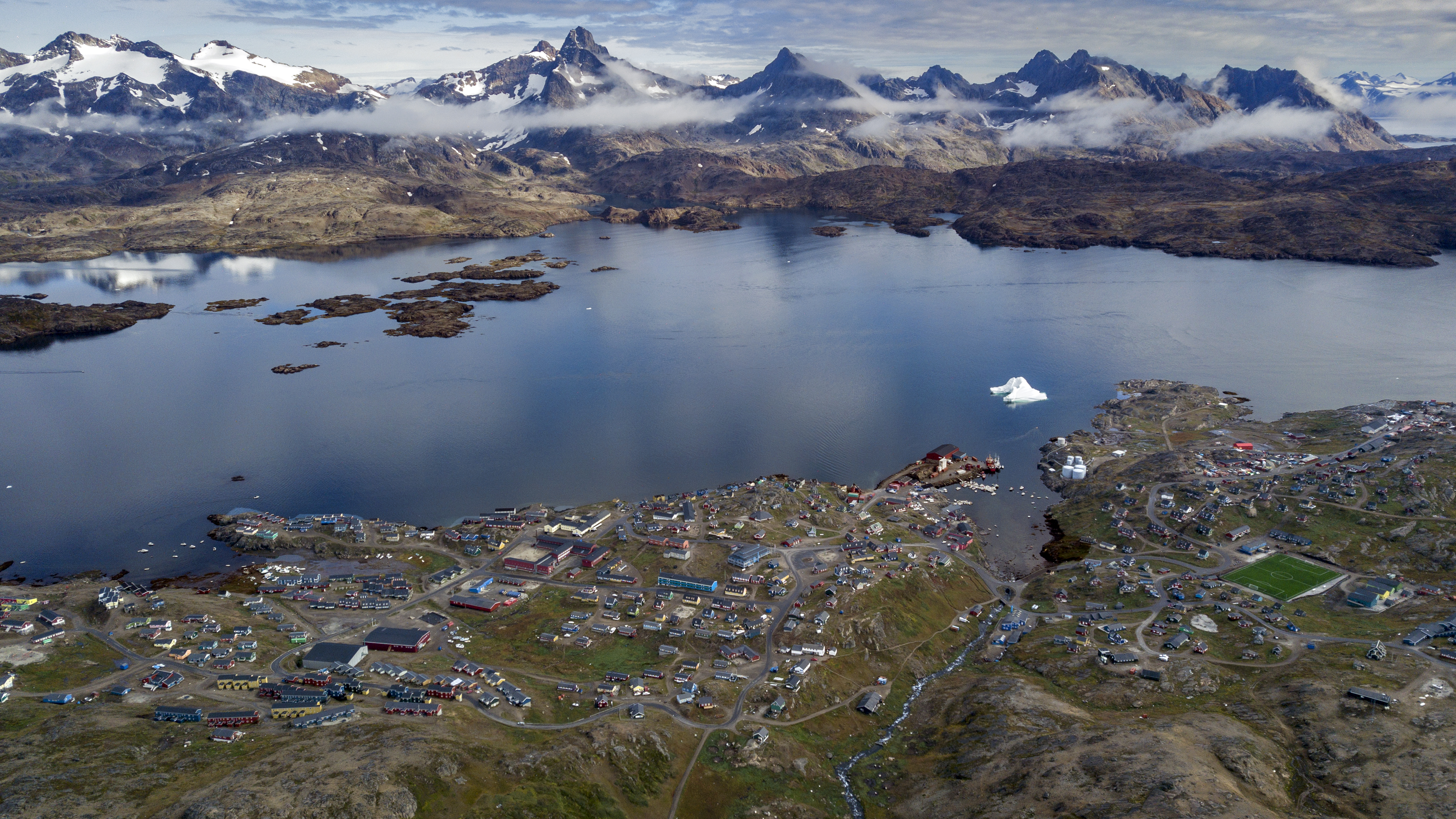
- View of Tasiilaq

- Location within Greenland
- Coordinates: 65°36′49″N 37°37′52″W
- State: Kingdom of Denmark
- Constituent country: Greenland
- Municipality: Sermersooq
- Founded: 1894
- Elevation: 20 m (65 ft)

Population (2025)
  - Total: 1,830
- Time zone: UTC-02:00 (WGT)
  - Summer (DST): UTC-01:00 (WGST)
- Postal code: 3913

Tasiilaq, formerly Ammassalik or Angmagssalik (Danish names: Kong Oscars Havn or simply Oscarshavn), is a town on Ammassalik Island in southeastern Greenland, within the municipality of Sermersooq. With 1,985 inhabitants as of 2020, it is the most populous community on the eastern coast, and the seventh-largest town in Greenland. The Sermilik Station, dedicated to the research of the nearby Mittivakkat Glacier, is near the town.

== History ==
=== Prehistory to the fifteenth century ===
The people of Saqqaq culture were the first to reach eastern Greenland, arriving from the north through what is now known as Peary Land and Independence Fjord, to be surpassed by the Dorset culture. The Norse would have been familiar with the area as the first landmark on the voyage between Iceland's Snæfellsnes peninsula and Greenland. Thule migrations passed through the area in the fifteenth century, finding the southeastern coast uninhabited.

=== Eighteenth and nineteenth centuries ===
Due to back migrations to the more densely populated western coast, the southeastern coast was deserted for another two hundred years – the region was not settled until late eighteenth century, with the village surviving as the only permanent settlement in the nineteenth century. Population increased however from the 1880s, dispersing over several villages in the area.

In 1884 and 1885, Danish naval captain Gustav Holm led an expedition in the area, marking the area's first connections with Europe. By the mid 1880s, about 400 people lived in the village, which faced the challenges of "vanishing resources, malnutrition, and disease".

The permanent settlement was founded in 1894 as a Danish trading station. The town was previously known as Ammassalik (old spelling: Angmagssalik), meaning "the place with the Ammassat".

In 1908, the first church was established in Tasiilaq. A second church was built in 1986, with interior decoration by artist Aka Høegh.

At least up to the 1920s, locals would leave town in the summer for hunting and fishing camps in the mountains and fjords.

From the end of World War II into the 1960s, the town shifted from relying on hunting to relying on cod fisheries for food and economic prospects.

The official name change to Tasiilaq, meaning "the place at the lakes," took place in 1997.

=== Twenty-first century ===
Alcohol consumption was banned by Greenland's self rule authority in Tasiilaq on 7 September 2021, over a two-week period until 17 September following a surge of violence and suicide in the town. Following this prohibition, reports of domestic violence had greatly decreased. Social workers from the town said that "it is only a short term solution, but necessary to put the brakes on alcohol-fueled incidents."

== Geography ==
Tasiilaq is located approximately 106 km (66 mi) south of the Arctic Circle, on the southeastern coast of Ammassalik Island, on the shore of a natural harbour in Tasiilaq Fjord, named Kong Oscars Havn by Alfred Gabriel Nathorst in 1883. The fjord is an inlet of the long Ammassalik Fjord emptying into the North Atlantic to the east of the town. The large Sermilik Fjord lies further to the west.

== Population ==
With 1,985 inhabitants as of 2020, Tasiilaq is one of the fastest-growing towns in Greenland. The migrants are continuing the trend for population growth. Other than Nuuk, it is the only town in the Sermersooq municipality exhibiting stable growth patterns over the last two decades. The population increased by over 37% relative to the 1990 levels, and by over 18% relative to the 2000 levels.

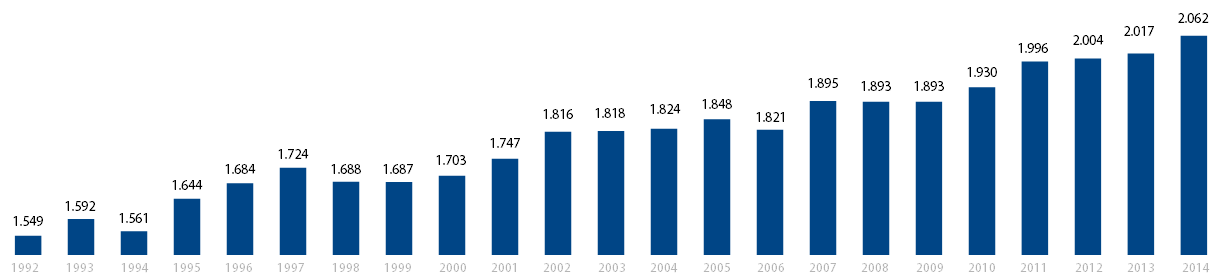
Tasiilaq population growth dynamics, 1992-2014. Source: Statistics Greenland

== Language ==
Tasiilaq is the main location where East Greenlandic is spoken.

== Transport ==
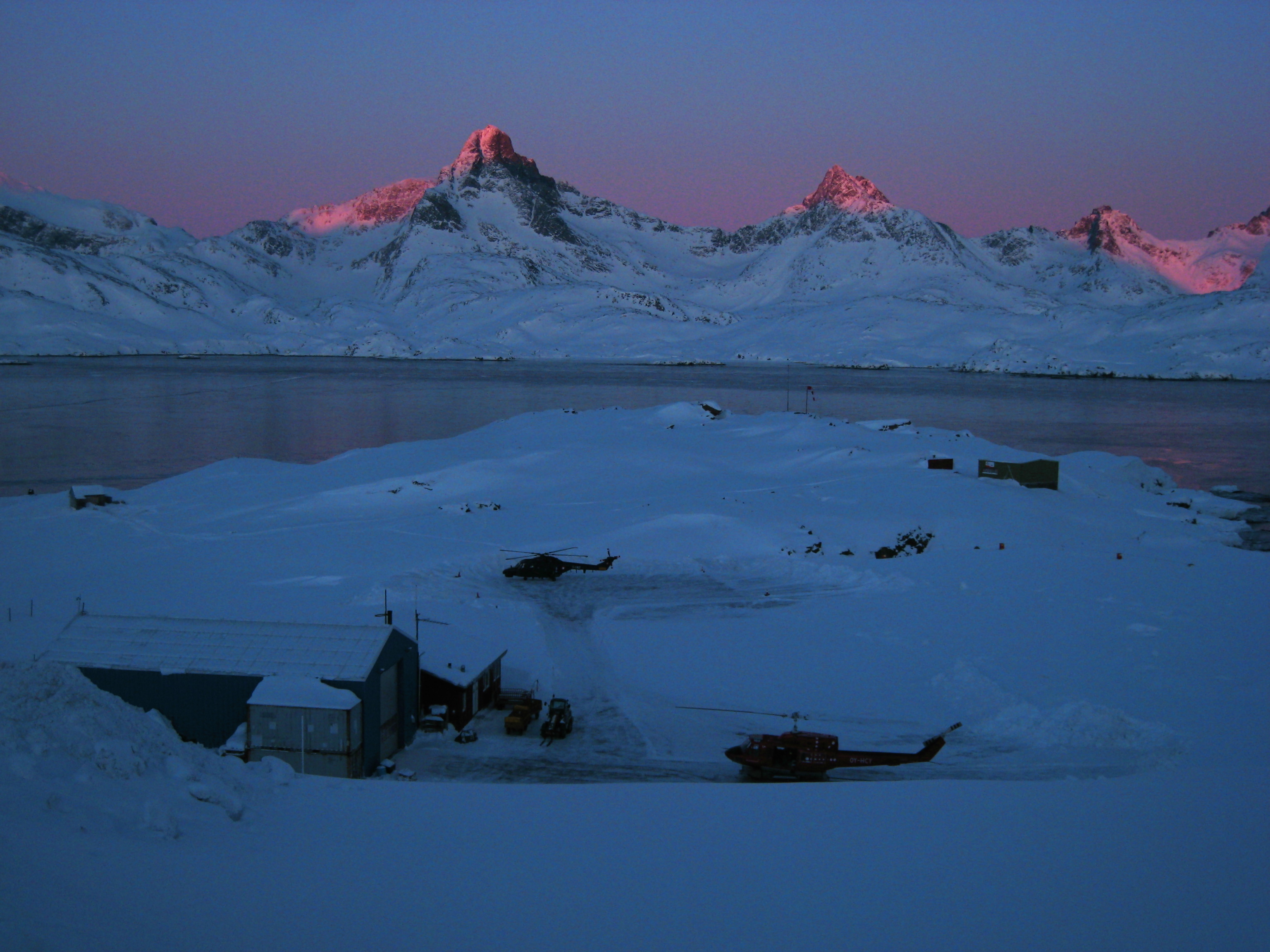
Tasiilaq Heliport in winter

There are no roads far outside Tasiilaq. The longest is a 3 km (1.9 mi) narrow gravel road to the hydro power plant. Transport to further places is by helicopter or boat.

Air Greenland operates helicopter services from Tasiilaq Heliport to neighboring Kulusuk Airport (24 km (15 mi) away), which offers connections to Nuuk, and to Iceland. The heliport serves as a local helicopter hub with flights to several villages in the region: Isortoq, Kuummiit, Sermiligaaq, and Tiniteqilaaq.

In the summer, the cargo boats of Royal Arctic Line connect Tasiilaq with Kulusuk, providing an ad hoc alternative for the helicopter flights of Air Greenland.

== Tourism ==
In summer main activities involve: ice cave tours, ice climbing, glacier hikes, boat trips, whale watching and kayaking.

As of 2005, the town saw "several hundred tourists from Iceland" each year, who would travel to the town via helicopter after arriving at the airport in Kulusuk.

== Climate ==
Tasiilaq has a tundra climate (ET), with long, cold and snowy winters and short, cool drier summers. From time to time, Tasiilaq is affected by piteraqs. On 6 February 1970, the worst piteraq ever documented hit Tasiilaq, causing heavy damage and nearly ruining the town.

Climate data for Tasiliaq (1991-2020 normals)
Month	Jan	Feb	Mar	Apr	May	Jun	Jul	Aug	Sep	Oct	Nov	Dec	Year
Record high °C (°F)	9.8 (49.6)	15.2 (59.4)	15.1 (59.2)	15.2 (59.4)	17.9 (64.2)	25.3 (77.5)	25.2 (77.4)	25.2 (77.4)	21.2 (70.2)	19.3 (66.7)	21.6 (70.9)	12.2 (54.0)	25.3 (77.5)
Mean daily maximum °C (°F)	−3.3 (26.1)	−3.1 (26.4)	−2.6 (27.3)	1.3 (34.3)	4.5 (40.1)	8.4 (47.1)	10.9 (51.6)	10.3 (50.5)	6.9 (44.4)	2.5 (36.5)	−0.4 (31.3)	−2.3 (27.9)	2.8 (37.0)
Daily mean °C (°F)	−6.0 (21.2)	−6.1 (21.0)	−5.9 (21.4)	−2.2 (28.0)	1.3 (34.3)	4.8 (40.6)	7.2 (45.0)	6.9 (44.4)	4.2 (39.6)	0.1 (32.2)	−2.8 (27.0)	−4.9 (23.2)	−0.3 (31.5)
Mean daily minimum °C (°F)	−8.9 (16.0)	−9.2 (15.4)	−9.2 (15.4)	−5.7 (21.7)	−1.8 (28.8)	1.3 (34.3)	3.5 (38.3)	3.8 (38.8)	1.7 (35.1)	−2.2 (28.0)	−5.2 (22.6)	−7.6 (18.3)	−3.3 (26.1)
Record low °C (°F)	−30.3 (−22.5)	−30.7 (−23.3)	−32.0 (−25.6)	−25.4 (−13.7)	−15.7 (3.7)	−8.6 (16.5)	−3.5 (25.7)	−5.7 (21.7)	−7.6 (18.3)	−18.3 (−0.9)	−25.2 (−13.4)	−29.6 (−21.3)	−32.0 (−25.6)
Average precipitation mm (inches)	113.2 (4.46)	99.3 (3.91)	93.6 (3.69)	75.4 (2.97)	58.3 (2.30)	34.9 (1.37)	39.4 (1.55)	58.8 (2.31)	89.8 (3.54)	71.0 (2.80)	91.4 (3.60)	90.0 (3.54)	915.1 (36.04)
Average precipitation days (≥ 1 mm)	12.5	11.2	11.5	9.7	8.4	5.9	6.2	8.1	9.3	9.3	10.8	10.8	113.7
Mean monthly sunshine hours	1	34	116	162	188	234	245	189	144	55	10	0	1,378
Percentage possible sunshine	0.1	14.4	32.0	35.5	32.3	35.7	39.1	36.7	36.7	18.2	5.3	0.0	23.8
Source 1: Danish Meteorological Institute
Source 2:

== Twin Town – Sister City ==
Tasiilaq is twinned with:

- Kópavogur, Iceland
