= Nuuk Municipality =

Former municipality of Greenland

Nuuk Municipality was one of the municipalities of Greenland until 31 December 2008. On 1 January 2009, it was merged with four other former municipalities into the new Sermersooq municipality. The central town was Nuuk. Other settlements within its borders were Kangerluarsoruseq, Kapisillit, and Qeqertarsuatsiaat.
