= Sermilik Station =

Research station in Greenland

Coordinates: 65°41′N 37°55′W

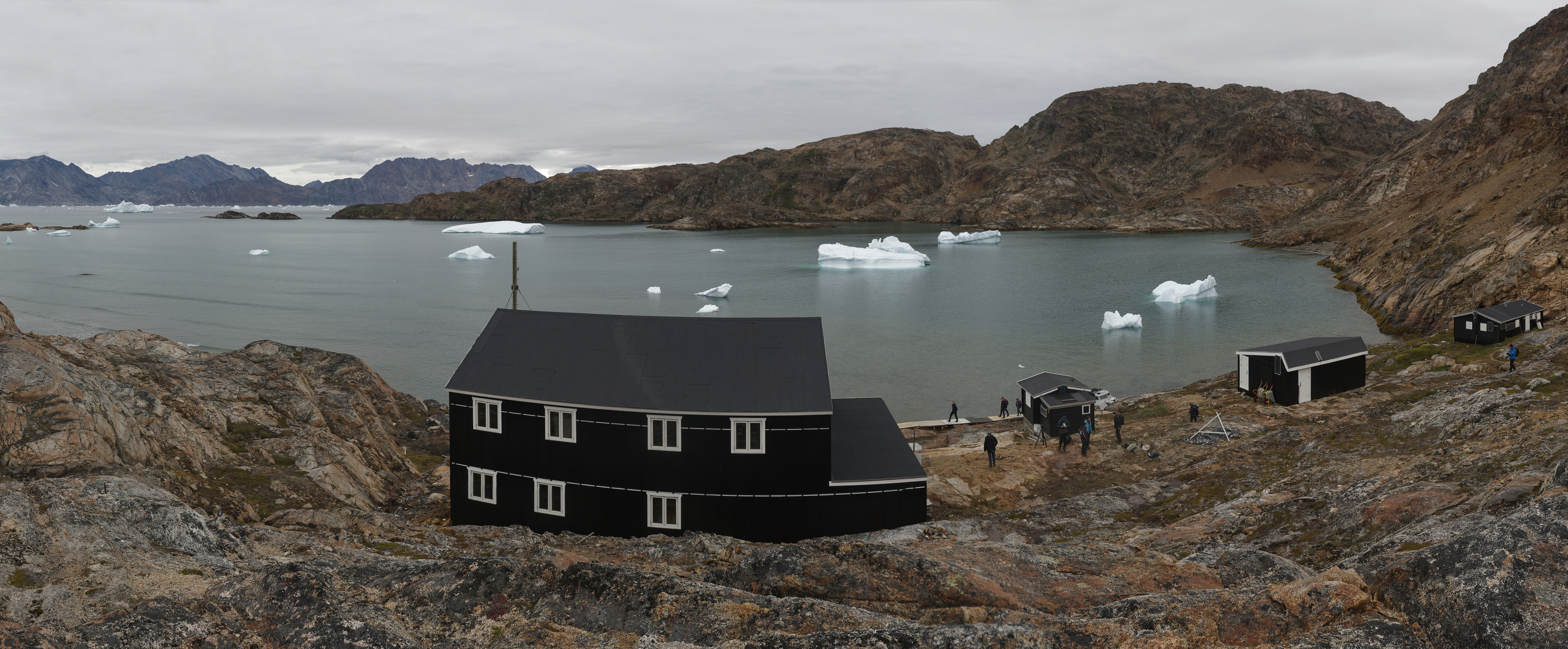
Panorama of Sermilik Station towards the sea (2023)

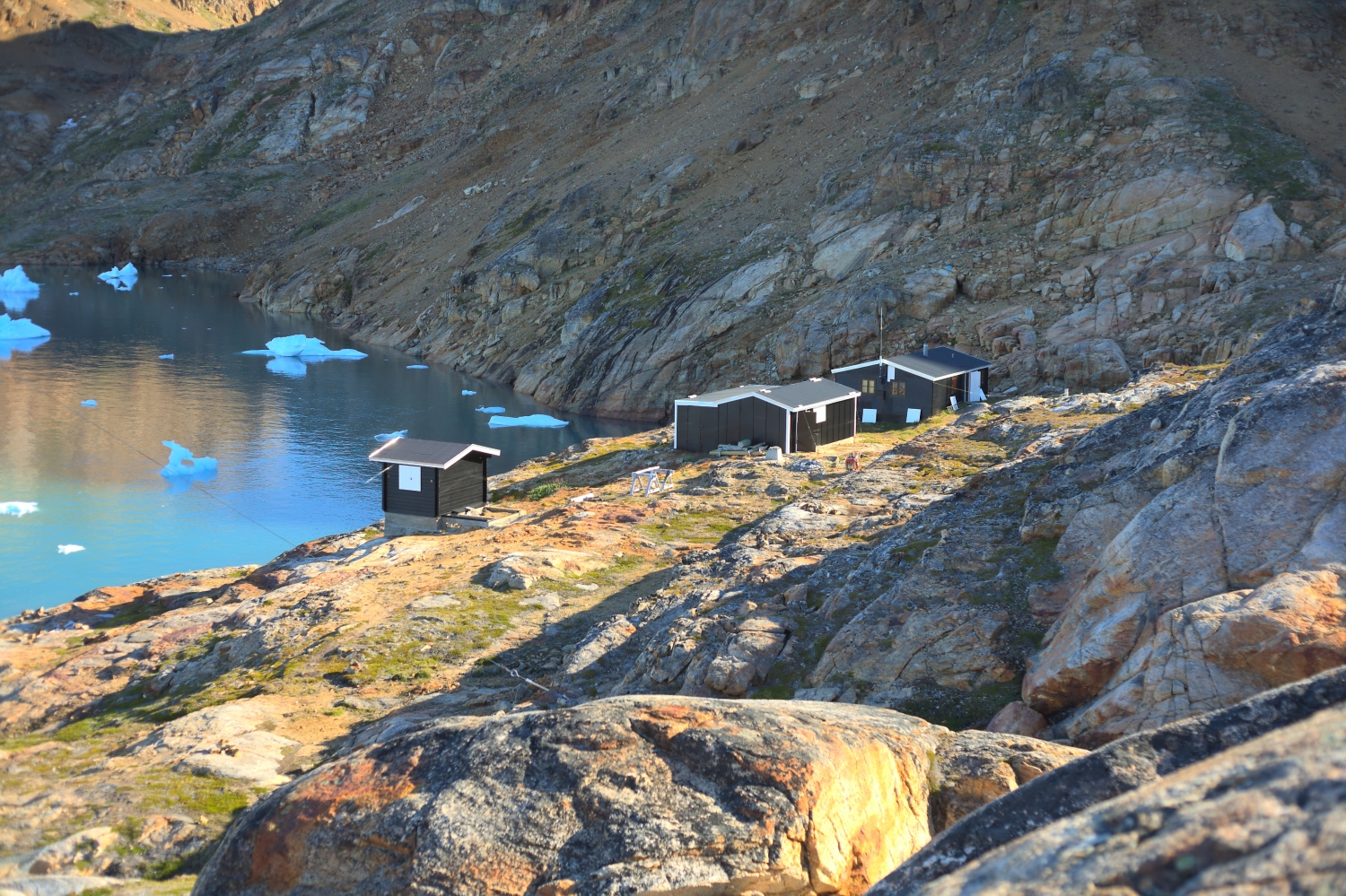
Sermilik Station, August 2007

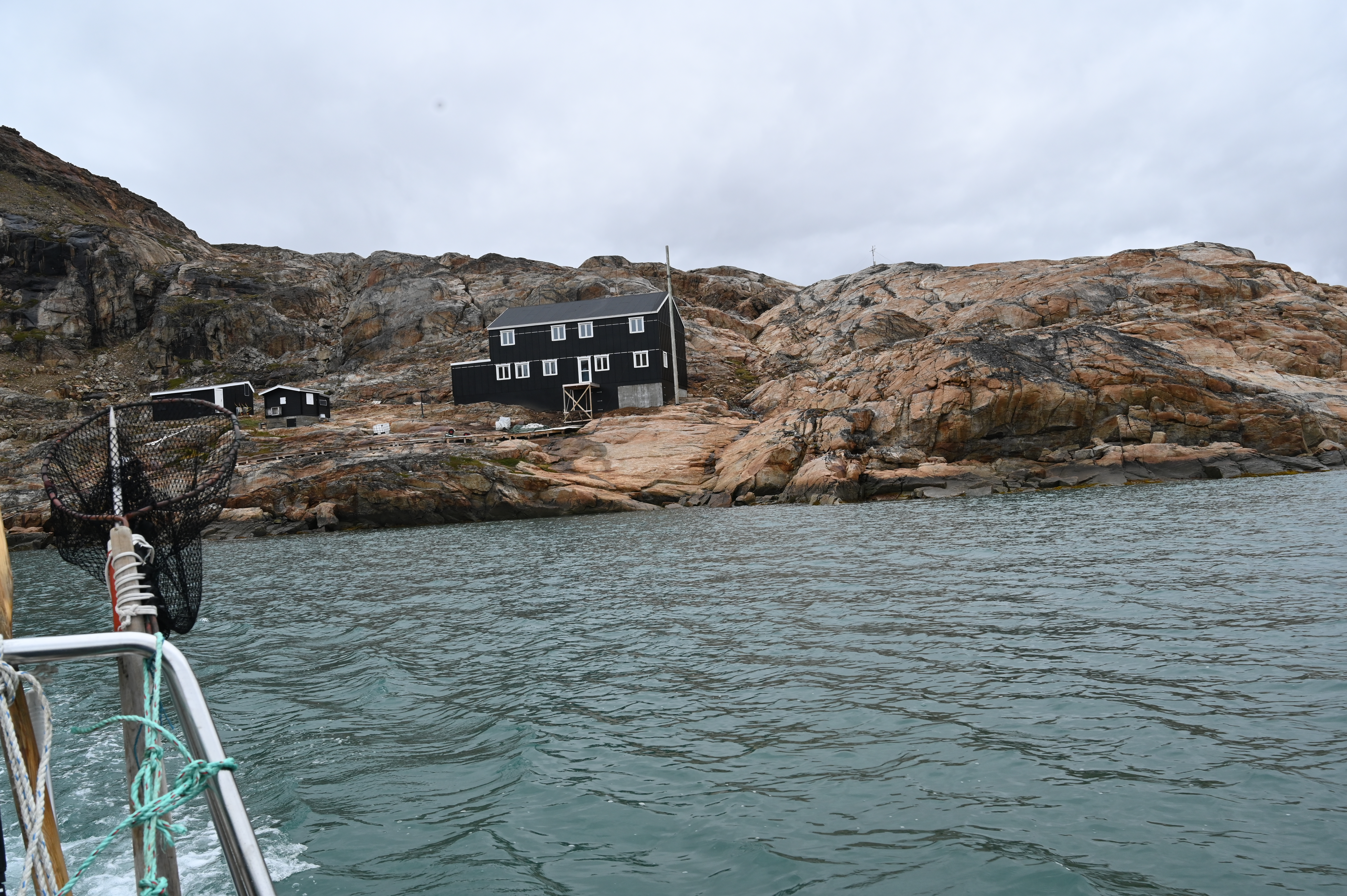
Sermilik Station, September 2023

Sermilik Station is a glaciology research station on Ammassalik Island, dedicated to the research of the nearby Mittivakkat Glacier. It is run jointly by the Department of Geography and Spatial Planning at the University of Graz and the Department of Geography at the University of Copenhagen. The University of Graz is part of the Austrian Polar Research Institute (APRI), a research consortium that promotes and coordinates research and education in the field of polar sciences at the participating organisations.

== Location ==
The station is located on the west coast of Ammassalik Ø in East Greenland on the southern shore of Sivinganiip Kangertiva Bay, to the east of Sermilik Fjord. The nearest inhabited places are Tasiilaq 15 km southeast and Tiilerilaaq 23 km north. Deserted Ikkatteq is only 6 km to the south. Directly east of the station is the Mittivakkat glacier.

== History ==
In 1933, the glaciers of Ammassalik Ø were first subjected to a scientific survey by Knud Rasmussen's Seventh Thule Expedition. In the International Geophysical Year 1957, the Mittivakkat glacier was one of the Danish research objects. At that time it had retreated by 600 m compared to 1933. In 1970 The station was built by the University of Copenhagen to provide the logistical base for the research. In 1972, an avalanche destroyed the main building. It was rebuilt later closer to the shore, which is its current location.

In 2022, the University of Graz signed a cooperation agreement with the University of Copenhagen and, with a donation from Austrian entrepreneur Christian Palmers, built another two-story building that will provide space for 25 researchers from 2024. The Station was pre-opened in 2023 and will be run jointly by both universities.

== Equipment ==
The original station of the University of Copenhagen consists of three detached buildings, which have been supplemented since 2023 by a two-storey new building and a technical building from the University of Graz.

The buildings of the University of Copenhagen consist of a 60 m² wooden house with three functional or sleeping rooms (management and radio, laboratory and technology), each with a bunk bed, a dining and recreation room, a kitchen, a toilet and an anteroom. In addition, there is a second, non-insulated building of around 50 m² that serves as a workshop, tool shed and storage room for operating materials and an inflatable boat. In addition, two rooms with two beds each are integrated into this building on the northwest side, but these can only be used in summer. The third of the original and smallest buildings, which is closest to the new building of the University of Graz, was designed as a laboratory. It currently also houses a bedroom for two people during summer operation. It is planned to renovate the tool shed and the laboratory after the new station is fully operational.

The two-storey building from the University of Graz is the most thermally efficient building on the east coast of Greenland. It meets all standards, includes a smart control system and reduces operating costs so that the focus can be on research when visiting the station. It offers comfortable space for up to 29 people on almost 300 m². The ground floor houses a cold storage room, a heated storage and drying room, a 56-square-metre common room adjacent to the large open-plan kitchen, a bathroom with two toilets, a 16-square-metre room for the station manager with two beds, and a 10-square-metre bedroom with two beds. The ground floor also houses the security system, the building control system and, next to the bathroom, the laundry room. Upstairs, there is an 18 m² terrace, five bedrooms, each with an area of 14 m² and two bunk beds, and a small bedroom with an area of 9 m² and a bunk bed. There is also another bathroom with two showers and two toilets. In the two-bed rooms, all bunk beds have an additional integrated spare bed. The building is designed so that it can be used by up to six people even in winter, and only on the ground floor. The upper floor is largely closed in winter and in the transitional seasons for reasons of energy efficiency. Only the few sensitive building services, such as the hot water boiler or the wet area, are kept at a constant 5 °C.

All systems in the station are designed to be redundant, ensuring a fully functional and protective shelter for several weeks, even in extreme weather conditions. Electricity is supplied in spring, summer and autumn by means of a photovoltaic system with around 50 kW peak and a 100 kWh battery storage. As a backup, for peak loads and in the winter months, there are two efficient diesel generators, each with 50 kW. The overall concept of the new station is designed for energy efficiency and sustainability. For example, any equipment not needed in the control centre at the University of Graz is automatically switched off and the heating is adjusted. Fresh water comes from a nearby source, the Mittivakkat glacier. Since the drinking water supply at the station is not constant throughout the year and therefore cannot be guaranteed, drinking water is stored in the attic of the building after filtering and UV treatment in spring. The tanks located there hold 10,000 litres of drinking water and, like the rest of the water and wastewater technology, are kept at a constant temperature of 5°C during the cold season. The toilet is flushed with seawater, which is also stored and can be pumped directly from the fjord as needed.

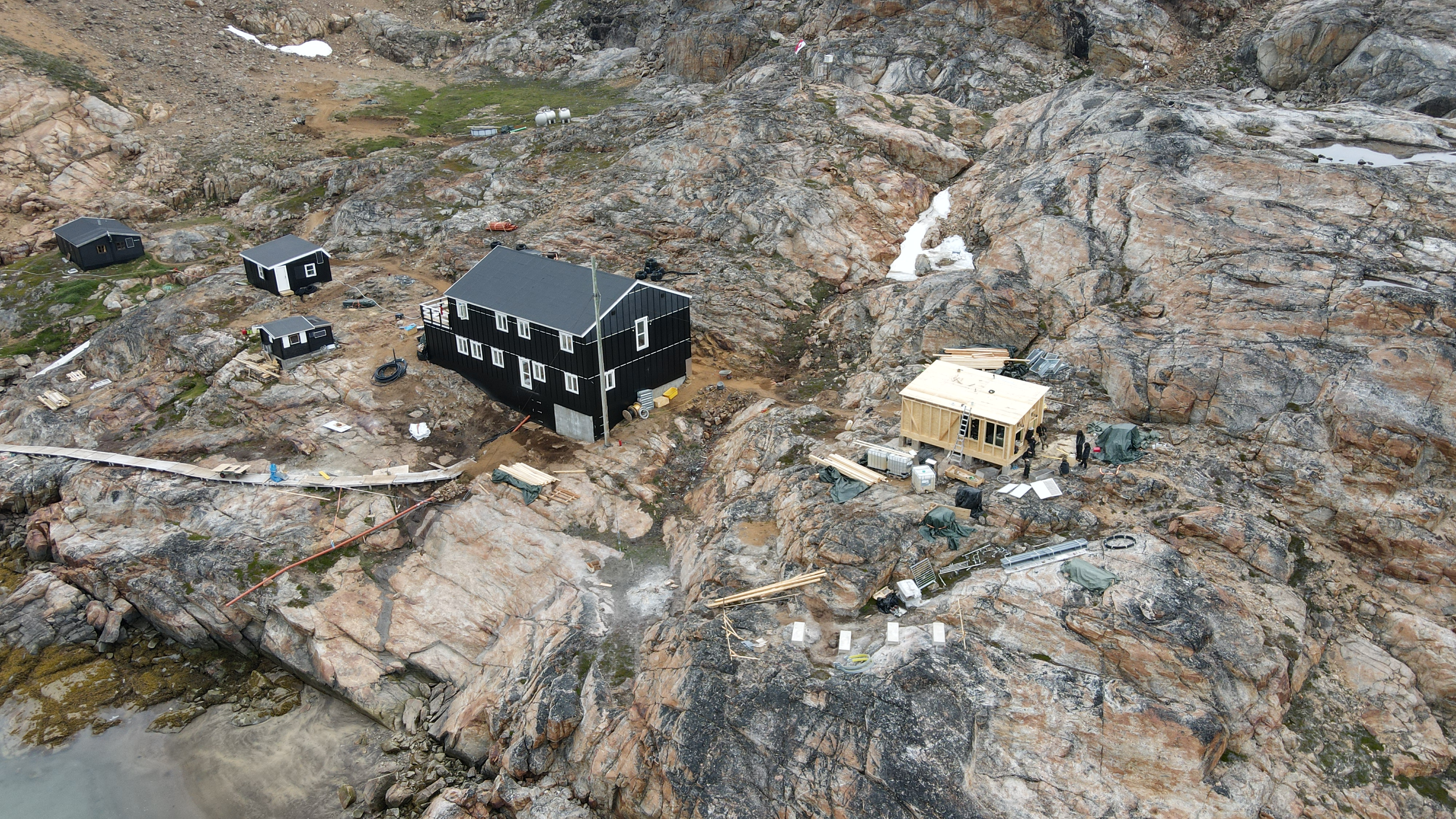
View of the Sermilik Research Station with the power house being built in summer 2025

From the beginning of July to mid-August 2025, the last building, the power plant, was constructed and equipped. It is located 25 m southwest of the new station building. With a floor space of around 36 m², it offers sufficient space for two redundant 50 kW diesel emergency power generators, 100 kWh battery storage, and all other electrical equipment for distributing and receiving power from the PV generator with an output of around 50 kWp. The station's electrical system, which is thus available to all consumers, supplies 64 A at 400 VAC and is continuously deep-earthed. In the course of the work, the old station buildings were also connected to the energy infrastructure. 20 m northwest of the power plant building are the stainless-steel tanks of the fuel storage facility with a total capacity of 9000 l of diesel. All energy infrastructure systems were designed to be redundant to ensure safe operation in the event of any failures. To this end, a monitoring system consisting of cameras and sensors (e.g., leakage, temperature, open contact, and gas escape sensors) was also installed and connected via fiber optic cables.

At the weather station, at an altitude of 515 metres, there is also a 6 m² refuge hut.

== Science ==
A year-round monitoring program of basic climate data and the local climate gradient in the drainage basin of the Mittivakkat glacier is carried out at the station. The main focus is on the mass balance of the glacier, sediment transport and landscape-forming processes. Based on the data series obtained since the early 1990s, models have been developed that can be used to forecast the effects of climate change on the development of the glaciers.

Researchers from the University of Graz are (as of September 2023) also investigating here what consequences climate change has on the occurrence of the storm wind Piteraq, which repeatedly causes devastating damage to buildings in East Greenland.

== See also ==
- List of research stations in the Arctic
- Dye 3
- Eismitte
- Ice core
- Liverpool Land
- Milne Land
- NEEM Camp
- North Ice
- Renland
- Scoresby Sund
- Summit Camp
