= Marinada =

Marinada may refer to:

- Marination in cooking
- Marinada, choral composition by Catalan composer Antoni Pérez Moya (1884-1964)
- "Marinada", song by Catalan singer Marina Rossell
- Marinada, a summer wind occurring in Catalonia
