= IOQ =

IOQ may refer to:

- Isortoq Heliport (IATA: IOQ), a heliport in Isortoq, Greenland
- Shenzhen North railway station (China Railway Telegraph code: IOQ), a railway station in Guangdong, China
