= Coat of arms of Sermersooq =

- Armiger: Sermersooq
- Adopted: 2008
- Shield: An inuksuk (cairn, or pile of stones)

The coat of arms of Sermersooq is the municipal logo and only symbol of Sermersooq, a Municipality of Greenland. The coat of arms was adopted in 2008, a year before Sermersooq became a subdivision of Greenland.

== Symbolism ==
The arms show an inuksuk (rock stack or cairn) in dark blue against a golden sun on a light blue field, standing on a white line representing an icesheet over stylized waves of blue and white. The inuksuk is an historical way of marking the roads in Greenland. The ice sheet covers most of Greenland, and the waves are for the water beneath it.

The arms are often depicted with a white background instead of a light blue one, as on the Sermersooq municipal website.
