= ISO 3166-2:GL =

Entry for Greenland in ISO 3166-2

ISO 3166-2:GL is the entry for Greenland in ISO 3166-2, part of the ISO 3166 standard published by the International Organization for Standardization (ISO), which defines codes for the names of the principal subdivisions (e.g., provinces or states) of all countries coded in ISO 3166-1.

Currently for Greenland, ISO 3166-2 codes are defined for five municipalities. The Northeast Greenland National Park and the Pituffik Space Base, which are unincorporated and not part of any municipality, are not listed.

Each code consists of two parts, separated by a hyphen. The first part is GL, the ISO 3166-1 alpha-2 code of Greenland. The second part is two letters.

== Current codes ==
Subdivision names are listed as in the ISO 3166-2 standard published by the ISO 3166 Maintenance Agency (ISO 3166/MA).

ISO 639-1 codes are used to represent subdivision names in the following administrative languages:

- (kl): Kalaallisut

Click on the button in the header to sort each column.

Code	Subdivision name (kl)	Subdivision name (en) (Note: For reference only, English name not included in the ISO 3166-2 standard.)
GL-AV	Avannaata Kommunia	Avannaata
GL-KU	Kommune Kujalleq	Kujalleq
GL-QT	Kommune Qeqertalik	Qeqertalik
GL-SM	Kommuneqarfik Sermersooq	Sermersooq
GL-QE	Qeqqata Kommunia	Qeqqata

== Changes ==
The following changes to the entry have been announced by the ISO 3166/MA since the first publication of ISO 3166-2 in 1998. ISO stopped issuing newsletters in 2013.

Newsletter	Date issued	Description of change in newsletter	Code/Subdivision change
Newsletter II-2	2010-06-30	Addition and update of the administrative structure and of the list and code sources	Subdivisions added: GL-KU Kommune Kujalleq; GL-QA Qaasuitsup Kommunia; GL-QE Qeqqata Kommunia; GL-SM Kommuneqarfik Sermersooq
Online Browsing; Platform (OBP)	2018-11-26	Deletion of municipality GL-QA; Addition of municipality GL-AV, GL-QT; Update List Source	Subdivision deleted: GL-QA Qaasuitsup Kommunia; Subdivisions added: GL-AV Avannaata Kommunia; GL-QT Kommune Qeqertalik

== See also ==
- Subdivisions of Greenland
- FIPS region codes of Greenland
- Neighbouring country: CA
