= Ikkatteq =

- Location within Greenland
- Coordinates: 65°38′10″N 37°56′57″W
- State: Kingdom of Denmark
- Constituent country: Greenland
- Municipality: Sermersooq
- Abandoned: 2005
- Time zone: UTC-03

Ikkatteq (old spelling: Íkáteĸ) was a small village in the Sermersooq municipality in southeastern Greenland. It was abandoned in 2005.

== Geography ==
The settlement was located on a small island in Sermilik Fjord, off the southwestern coast of Ammassalik Island, approximately 16 km (9.9 mi) to the west of Tasiilaq.
