= Southeast Greenland =

Southeast Greenland or Southeastern Greenland may refer to:

- King Frederick VI Coast
- King Christian IX Land
  - Blosseville Coast
  - Ammassalik Municipality
