= Tasiilaq Heliport =

Heliport on island of southeast Greenland

Tasiilaq Heliport Ammassalik Heliport
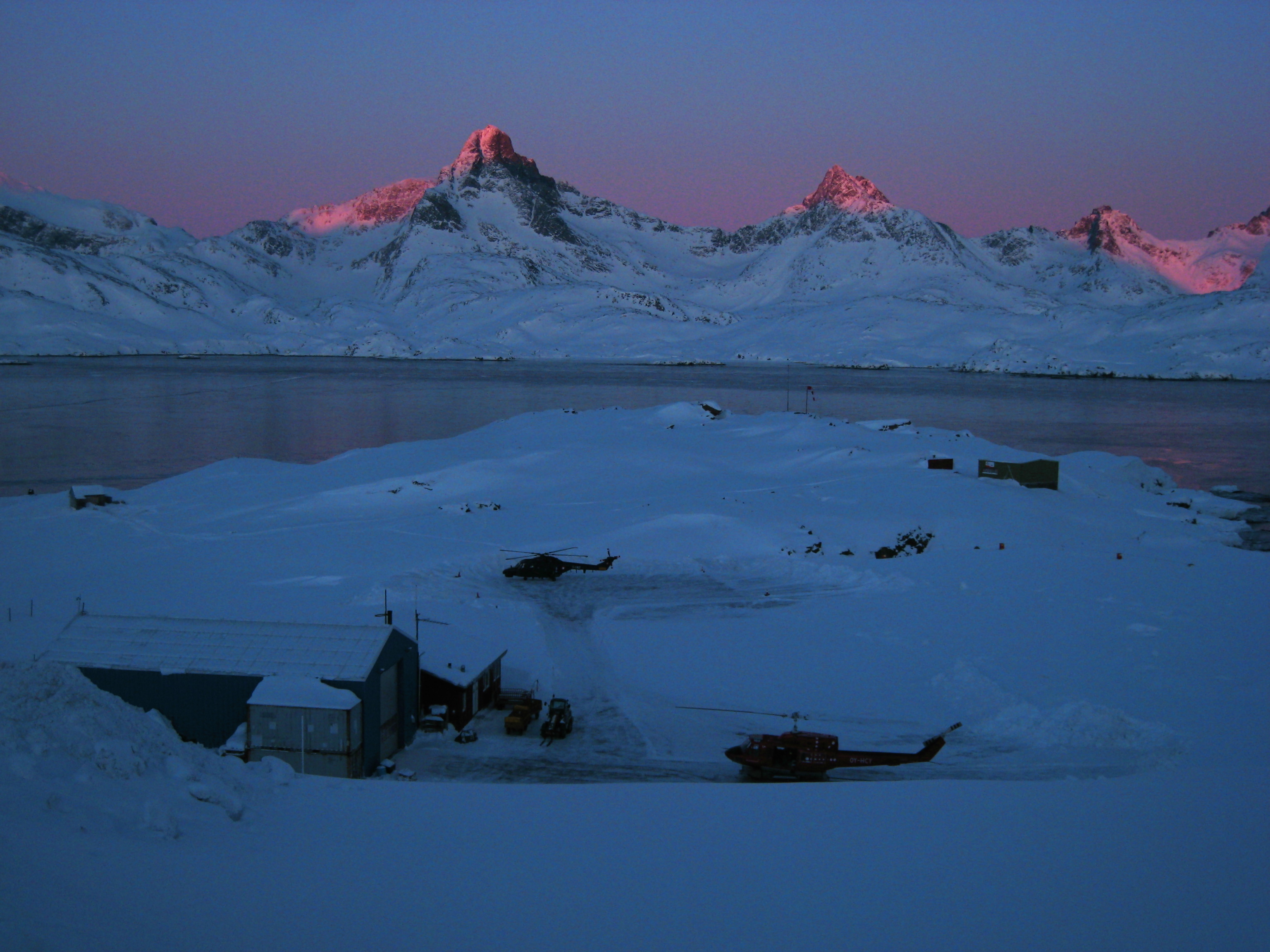
- IATA: AGM; ICAO: BGAM

Summary
- Airport type: Public
- Operator: Greenland Airport Authority (Mittarfeqarfiit)
- Serves: Tasiilaq, Greenland
- Elevation AMSL: 24 ft / 7 m
- Coordinates: 65°36′44″N 037°37′06″W
- Website: Tasiilaq Heliport

Map
- Location in Greenland

Helipads
Number	Length		Surface
Number	m	ft	Surface
1	30 × 20	66 × 66	Asphalt

Statistics (2012)
- Passengers: 6,471
- Aircraft movements: 1,385
- Source: Danish AIS; Statistics from airport

Tasiilaq Heliport or Ammassalik Heliport (IATA: AGM, ICAO: BGAM) is a heliport in Tasiilaq, a town located on the Ammassalik Island in the Sermersooq municipality, in southeastern Greenland. Until 1997 the heliport was known as Ammassalik Heliport and is still listed by the Danish authorities under that name.

== Airlines and destinations ==
Airlines	Destinations
Air Greenland	Kulusuk
Air Greenland (settlement flights)	Isortoq, Kuummiit, Sermiligaaq, Tiniteqilaaq

Air Greenland operates government contract flights to villages in the Tasiilaq regions. These are mostly cargo flights that are not featured in the timetable, although they can be pre-booked. Departure times for these flights as specified during booking are by definition approximate, with the settlement service optimized on the fly depending on local demand for a given day.

== Future ==
There are political discussions on building a new airport at Tasiilaq, the major settlement in the region, and to close the Kulusuk Airport.
