= Tiniteqilaaq Heliport =

Heliport in Greenland

- IATA: none; ICAO: BGTN

Summary
- Airport type: Public
- Operator: Greenland Airport Authority (Mittarfeqarfiit)
- Serves: Tiniteqilaaq, Greenland
- Elevation AMSL: 15 ft / 5 m
- Coordinates: 65°53′31″N 037°47′00″W
- Website: Tiniteqilaaq Heliport

Map
- Location in Greenland

Helipads
| Number | Length | | Surface |
| Number | m | ft | Surface |
|---|---|---|---|
| 1 | 15 | 49 | Gravel |
- Source: Danish AIS

Tiniteqilaaq Heliport (ICAO: BGTN) is a heliport in Tiniteqilaaq, a village in the Sermersooq municipality in southeastern Greenland. The heliport is considered a helistop, and is served by Air Greenland as part of a government contract.

== Airlines and destinations ==
| Airlines | Destinations |
|---|---|
| Air Greenland (settlement flights) | Tasiilaq |

Air Greenland operates government contract flights to villages in the Tasiilaq area. These mostly cargo flights are not featured in the timetable, although they can be pre-booked. Departure times for these flights as specified during booking are by definition approximate, with the settlement service optimized on the fly depending on local demand for a given day.
