= Katabatic wind =

Downslope wind due to a high-density air

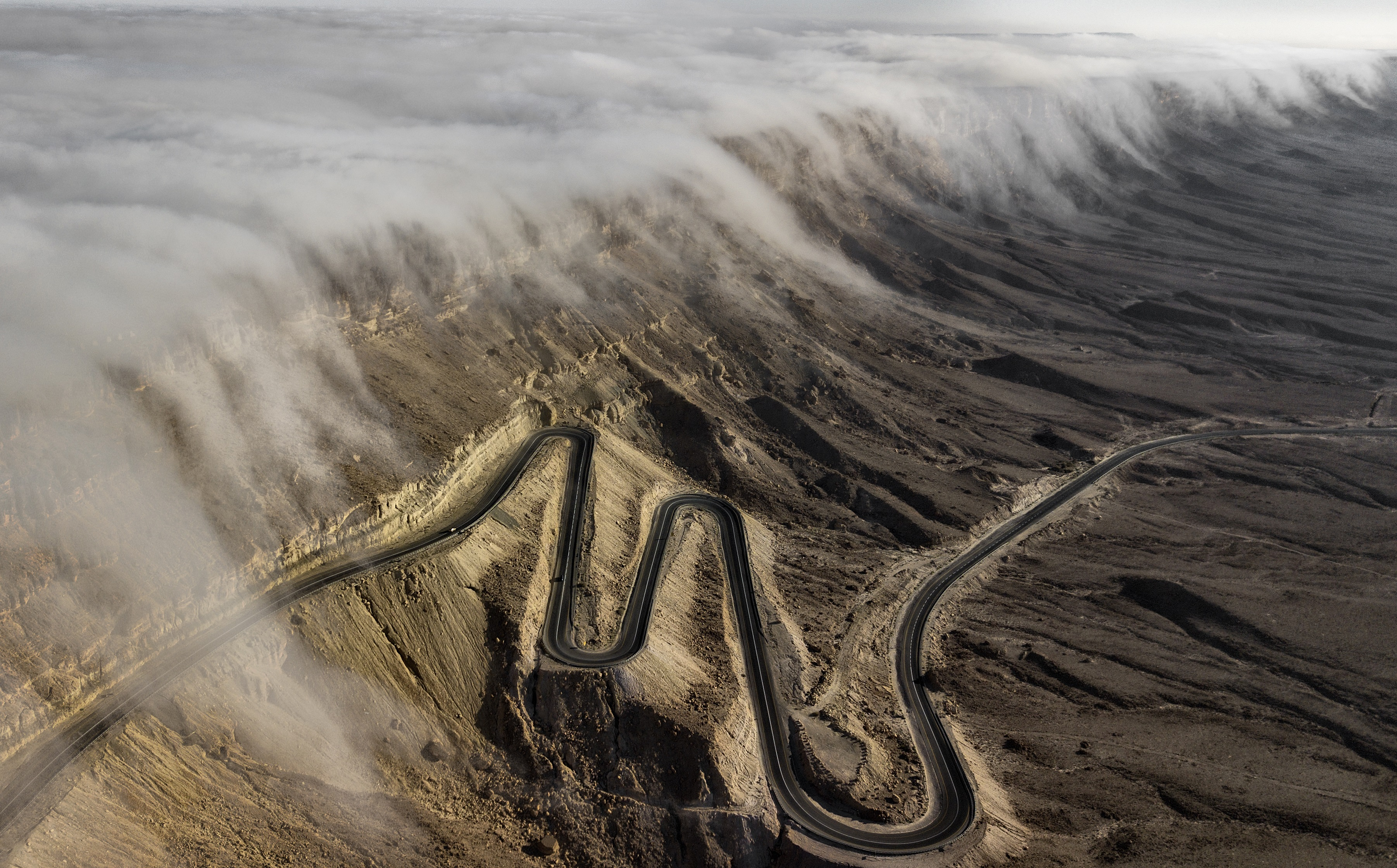
Plateau-cooled air falls into the Makhtesh Ramon, traced by radiation fog, just after dawn. Radiative cooling of the desert highlands chills the air, making it more dense than the air over the lowlands. Cooler air can also hold less water vapour; it condenses out as tiny fog droplets, which re-evaporate as the air warms. Here, the falling air is warming adiabatically, and so the fog re-evaporates as it falls.

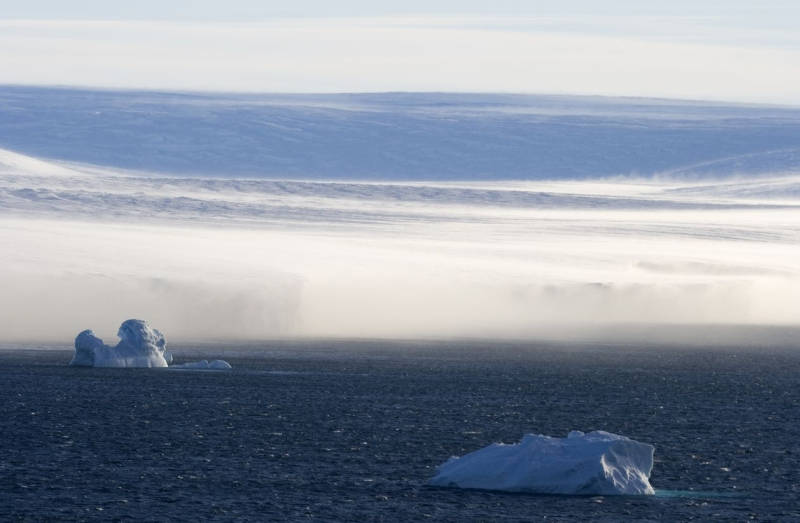
Katabatic wind in Antarctica

A katabatic wind (named from Ancient Greek κατάβασις (katábasis) 'descent') is a downslope wind caused by the flow of an elevated, high-density air mass into a lower-density air mass below. The spelling catabatic is also used. Since air density is strongly dependent on temperature, the high-density air mass is usually cooler, and the katabatic winds are relatively cool or cold.

Examples of katabatic winds include the downslope valley and mountain breezes, the piteraq winds of Greenland, the Bora in the Adriatic, the Bohemian Wind or Böhmwind in the Ore Mountains, the Santa Ana winds in southern California, the oroshi in Japan, or "the Barber" in New Zealand.

Not all downslope winds are katabatic. For instance, winds such as the föhn and chinook are rain shadow winds where air driven upslope on the windward side of a mountain range drops its moisture and descends leeward drier and warmer.

== Mechanism ==
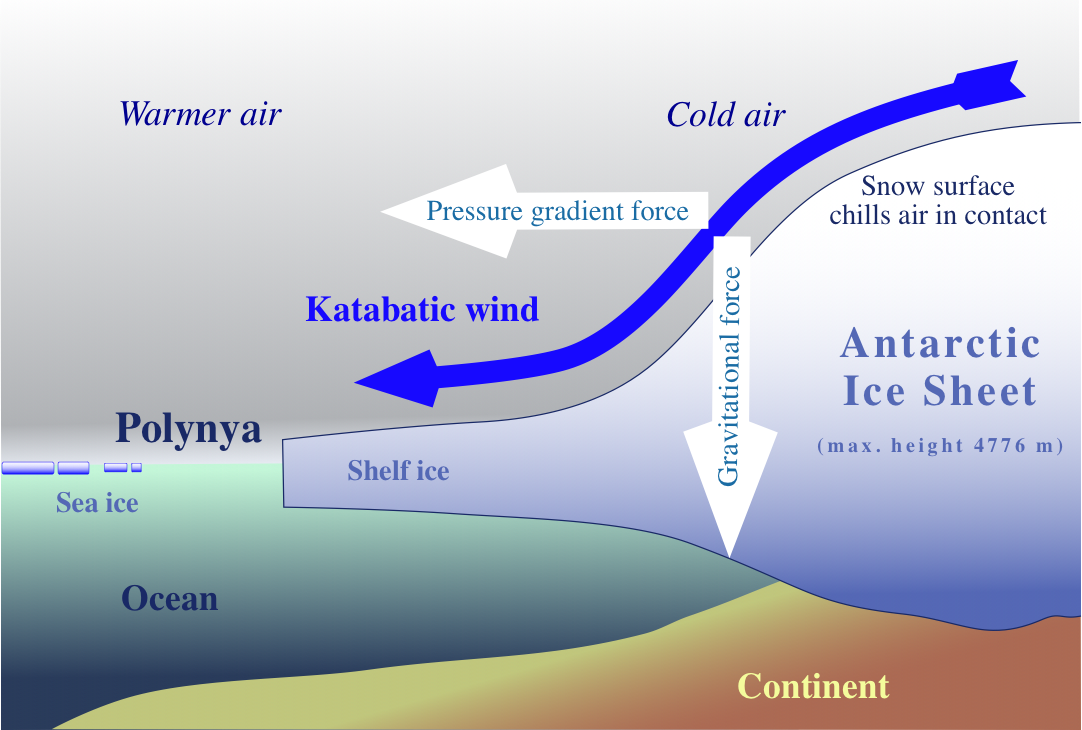
Sketch of the generation of katabatic winds in Antarctica

A katabatic wind originates from the difference of density of two air masses located above a slope. This density difference usually comes from temperature difference, though humidity may also play a role. Schematically, katabatic winds can be divided into two types for which the mechanisms are slightly different: the katabatic winds due to radiative cooling (the most common) and the fall winds. In general, colder air becomes denser than warmer air, which allows it to move downslope due to the gravity.

In the first case, the slope surface cools down radiatively after sunset through radiative cooling, as ground loss heat, which cools down the air near the slope. This cooler air layer then flows down in the valley, producing the downslope wind that is easily observed at night in mountainous areas. The term katabatic actually often refer to this type of wind.

In contrast, fall wind do not come from radiative cooling of the air, but rather from the advection of a relatively cold air mass to the top of a slope. This cold air mass can come from the arrival of a cold front (see Bora), or from the advection of cool marine air by a sea-breeze.

== Impacts ==
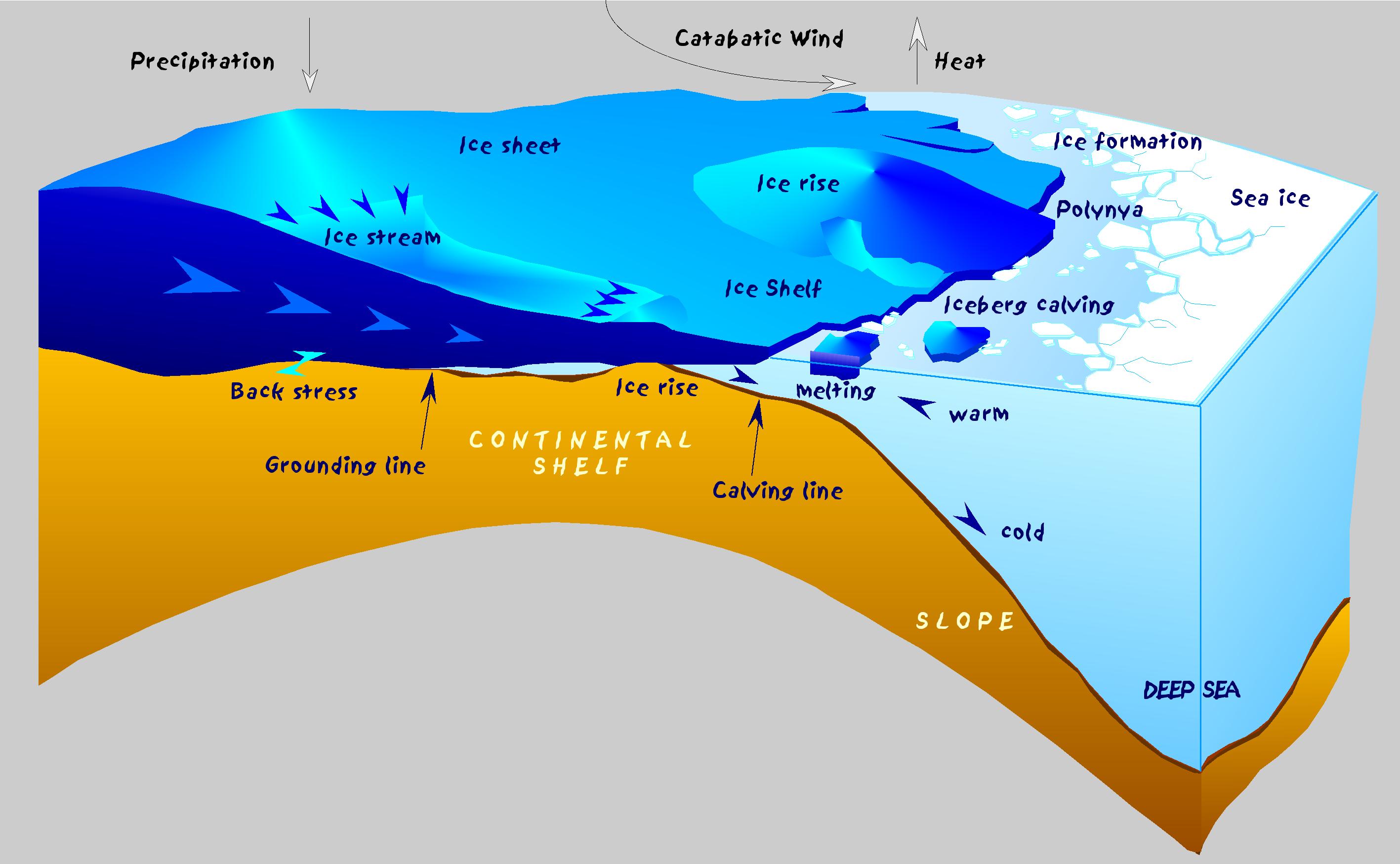
Coastal polynyas are produced in the Antarctic by katabatic winds

Katabatic winds are for example found blowing out from the large and elevated ice sheets of Antarctica and Greenland. The buildup of high density cold air over the ice sheets and the elevation of the ice sheets brings into play enormous gravitational energy. Where these winds are concentrated into restricted areas in the coastal valleys, the winds blow well over hurricane force, reaching around 160 kn (300 km/h; 180 mph). In Greenland these winds are called piteraq and are most intense whenever a low pressure area approaches the coast.

In a few regions of continental Antarctica the snow is scoured away by the force of the katabatic winds, leading to "dry valleys" (or "Antarctic oases") such as the McMurdo Dry Valleys. Since the katabatic winds are descending, they tend to have a low relative humidity, which desiccates the region. Other regions may have a similar but lesser effect, leading to "blue ice" areas where the snow is removed and the surface ice sublimates, but is replenished by glacier flow from upstream.

In the Fuegian Archipelago (Tierra del Fuego) in South America as well as in Alaska in North America, a wind known as a williwaw is a particular danger to harboring vessels. Williwaws originate in the snow and ice fields of the coastal mountains, and they can be faster than 120 kn (220 km/h; 140 mph; 62 m/s).

In California, strong katabatic wind events have been responsible for the explosive growth of many wildfires, including the 2018 Camp Fire and the 2020 North Complex.

The Marinada in Catalonia, Spain is a fall wind that eases the summer heat in the Urgell region.

== See also ==
- Anabatic wind
- Bora (wind)
- Foehn wind
- Piteraq
- Valley exit jet
