= Kangerluarsoruseq =

- Færingehavn
- Location within Greenland
- Coordinates: 63°41′51″N 51°32′43″W
- State: Kingdom of Denmark
- Constituent country: Greenland
- Municipality: Sermersooq
- Founded: 1927
- Abandoned: 2009
- Time zone: UTC-03

Kangerluarsoruseq, also known by its Danish name Færingehavn, is a former settlement in the Sermersooq municipality in southwestern Greenland. The village is situated about 50 km south of Nuuk.

== History ==
Kangerluarsoruseq was founded in 1927 by Faroese fishermen as Føroyingahavnin. Use of the site as a fishing port ended during the 1990s. The village was abandoned in late 2009.
