= Halny =

Foehn wind that blows in Poland and Slovakia

Halny^{[Note 1]} is a foehn wind that blows in southern Poland and in Slovakia in the Tatra Mountains of the Carpathians. The most turbulent halny blows in Podhale region of southern Poland, coming from the south, down the slopes of the Tatra Mountains; in Slovakia, on the other side of the mountains, it comes from the north.

Halny is a warm windstorm that blows through the valleys. It is often disastrous; ripping off roofs, causing avalanches and, according to some people, can have some influence on mental states.

Most halny occur in October and November, sometimes in February and March, rarely in other months. In May 1968 a destructive halny known as Wind of the Century where winds reportedly reached 288 km/h, destroyed large areas of forestry in southern Poland.

== See also ==
- Oroshi

== Notes ==
1. A note attempting to provide the English comprehension of halny, which lacks a one-word translation: Halny is a singular masculine noun in Polish (plural: halne) when denoting the wind. Wind is of masculine gender in Polish: wiatr. The terms halny and wiatr halny are synonymous. Halny is also a general masculine adjective derived from the feminine noun hala, a grassy meadow typical of the higher elevations of the Carpathian Mountains and the Alps. The feminine singular adjective is halna, while the neuter singular and the plural for all three genders of the adjective is halne.
