= Ikka Fjord =

Fjord in Greenland

- Ika Fjord (formerly)
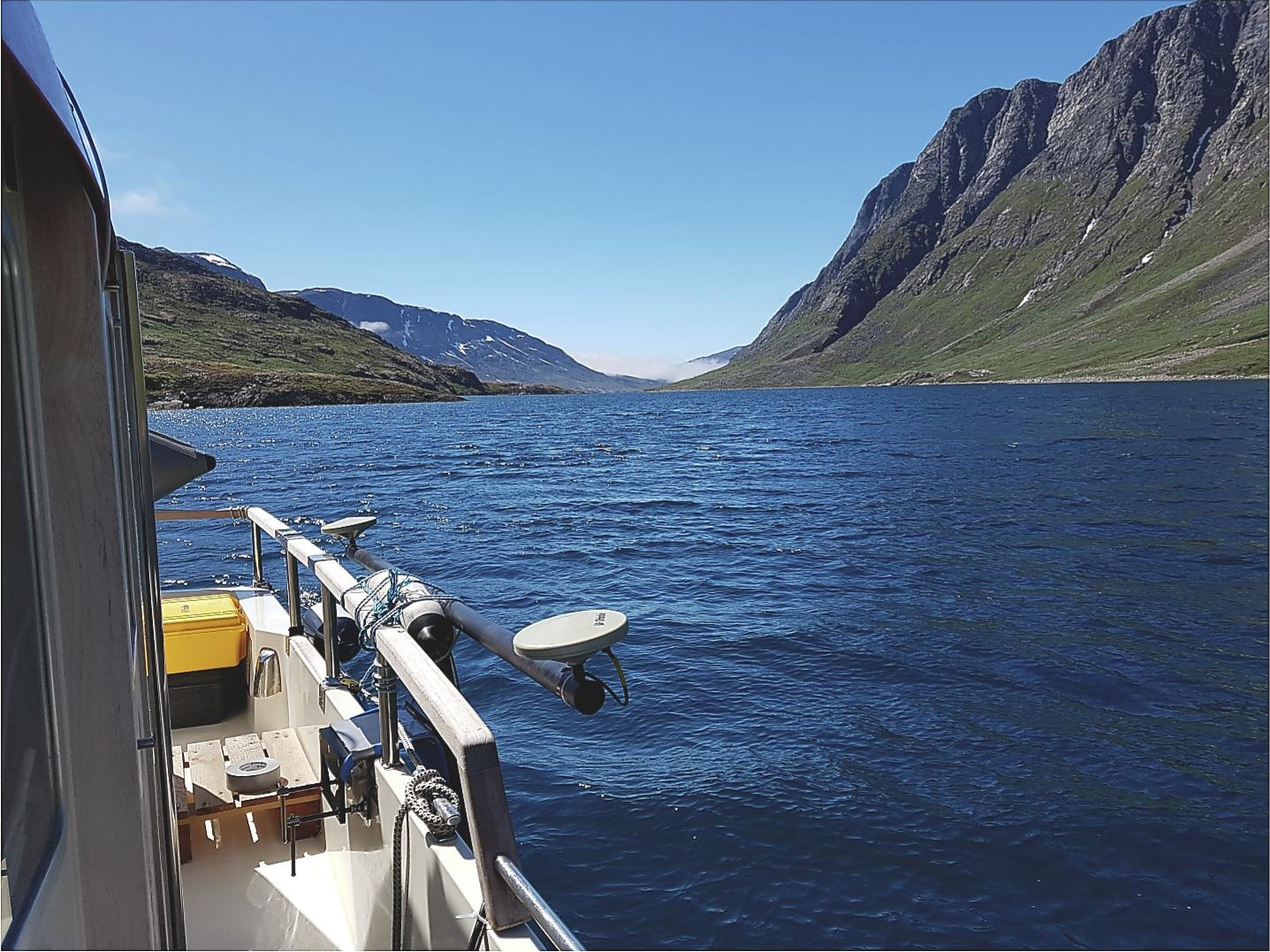
- View of Ikka Fjord from aboard survey vessel Siku

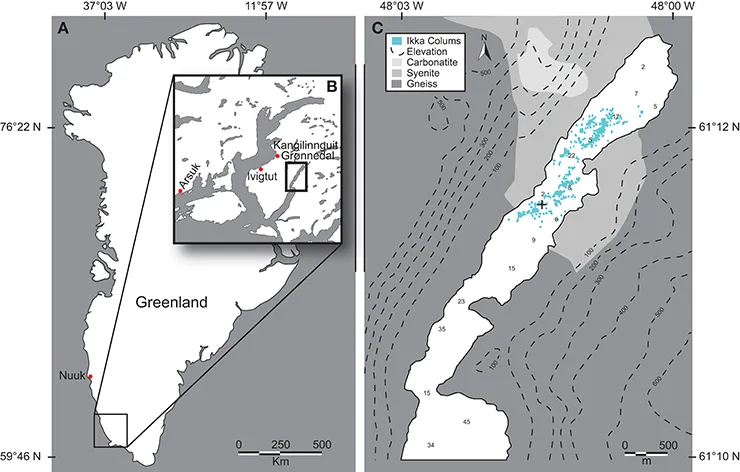
- Map of Greenland showing Ikka Fjord and map of Ikka Fjord showing ikaite columns in blue

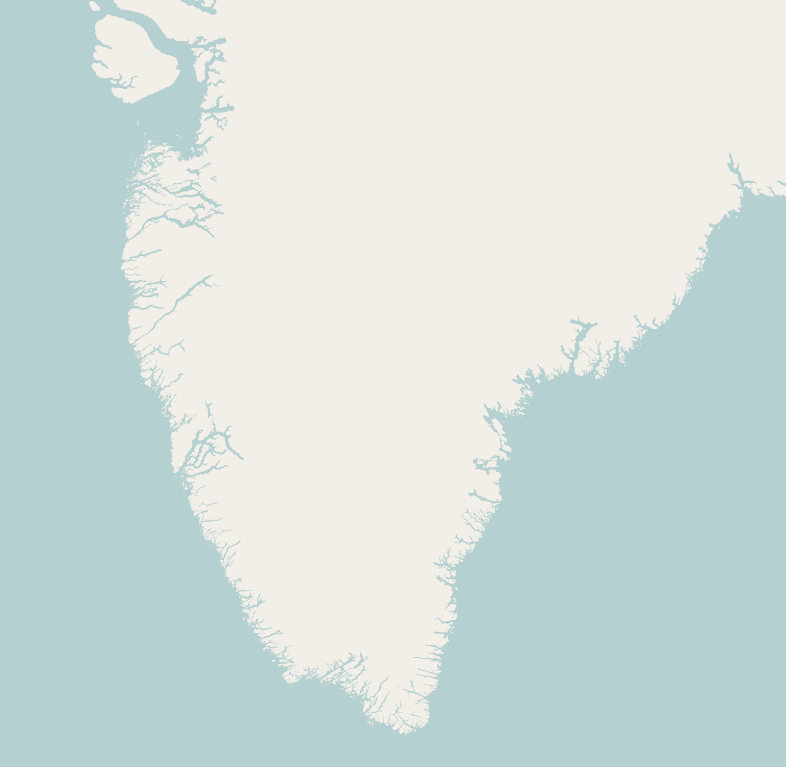
- Location of the fjord
- Location: Sermersooq municipality, Greenland
- Coordinates: 61.16°N 48.05°W
- Type: fjord
- Primary outflows: Arsuk Fjord
- Basin countries: Greenland
- Max. length: 12 km (7.5 mi)
- Max. depth: 29 m (95 ft)

Ikka Fjord (formerly spelled Ika) is a small, narrow fjord in Southwestern Sermersooq municipality, Greenland. It is best known for the presence of hundreds of pillars of the metastable mineral ikaite, which was named after the fjord, and is found in Ikka in dramatic formations not known to exist elsewhere.

== History ==
Local legend held that the tufa columns of the fjord were the remains of drowned Norsemen who had fallen through the ice, and who had been standing on the bottom ever since.

Ikka Fjord was first scientifically investigated in collaboration between Arctic researchers and Danish Navy frogmen stationed in Grønnedal in 1962. This investigation led to the first discovery of ikaite, which was previously unknown to science, and which tended to disintegrate during transport for analysis.

In 1995 and 1996, geophysical surveys of the fjord floor were conducted, and a two-year survey in the summers of 2018 and 2019 combining aerial drone photogrammetry and multibeam sonar gathered more data on the structure of the fjord and the ikaite tufa structures located within it.

== Morphology and hydrology ==
Ikka Fjord is the remains of a narrow glacial valley, and is flanked by cliffs 500 meters (1,600 ft) tall composed of gneiss from the Precambrian. It is intersected by syenitic and carbonatitic rocks of the 1,300 million-year-old Grønnedal-Ika igneous complex running perpendicular to the fjord. The water is composed of a lower seawater layer and an upper layer which is one to two meters deep and composed of less saline runoff.

The ikaite tufa columns of the fjord are located in a "garden" of less than one square kilometer where highly alkaline freshwater seeps into the bottom of the fjord and interacts with the cold seawater. A resulting chemical reaction then produces the tufa pillars, which are further fortified by coralline red algae of the genera Lithothamnion and Clathromorphum encrusting the bases. This garden overlays the intrusion by the Grønnedal-Ika complex, which supplies the carbonated freshwater.

At least 938 individual ikaite columns are known to exist, mostly in tight clusters that shield each other from tidal forces. The largest of these columns, "The Atoll", is submerged by less than a meter of water at low tide, and is strong enough to be stood on.

== Ecology ==
The unique conditions around and even inside the ikaite columns result in a similarly unique biome, including species found nowhere else. It is home to plants including orchids, fauna including halacaridae, and the aforementioned red algae. Many of the bacteria species found in the column gardens are found nowhere else.

== Conservation ==
The fjord has been declared a protected site by Greenland authorities and the United Nations Environment Programme, with some scientists even recommending World Heritage Site status on account of its uniqueness and biological diversity.

Ikaite columns cannot grow in water above 10°C, and warmer temperatures break them down. As a result, warming ocean temperatures threaten the ikaite columns and with them the fjord's unique ecosystem. As of 2019, the water of Ikka Fjord was still below this threshold, but the temperature could rise further.

== See also ==
- List of fjords of Greenland
- Mono Lake
- Pyramid Lake
