= Isertoq =

- Settlement
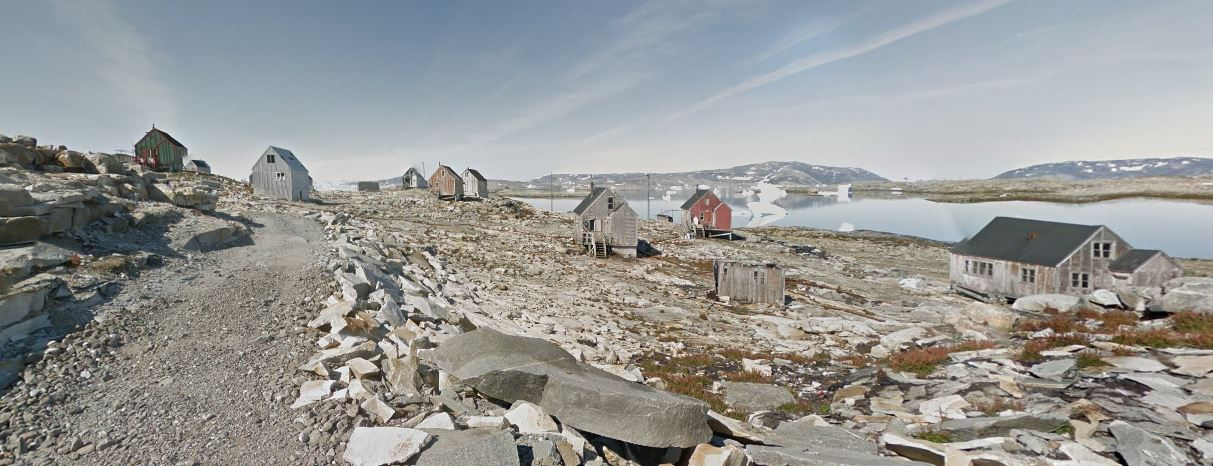
- View of Isertoq

- Location within Greenland
- Coordinates: 65°32′55″N 38°58′30″W
- State: Kingdom of Denmark
- Constituent country: Greenland
- Municipality: Sermersooq

Government
  - Mayor: Pele Maratse
- Elevation: 0.91 m (3 ft)

Population (2025)
  - Total: 51
- Time zone: UTC−02:00 (WGT)
  - Summer (DST): UTC−01:00 (WGST)
- Postal code: 3913 Tasiilaq

Isertoq (West Greenlandic: Isortoq) is a settlement in the Sermersooq municipality, in southeastern Greenland. Its population was 64 in 2020.

== Population ==
The population of Isertoq has decreased by nearly half relative to the 1990 levels, and by 27 percent relative to the 2000 levels, reflecting the depopulation of the nearby Kuummiit and Tiniteqilaaq.

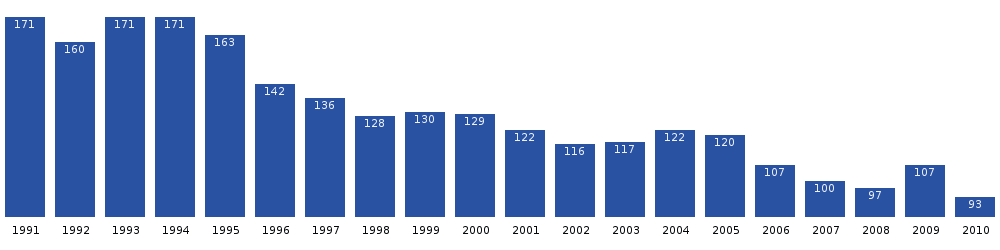
Isortoq population growth dynamics in the last two decades. Source: Statistics Greenland

== Transport ==
During weekdays Air Greenland serves the village as part of government contract, with flights from Isortoq Heliport to Nuuk Airport and Kulusuk Airport.

== Related ==
An Arctic cargobike, Isortoq, is named for the truly remote character of Isertoq.
