= Oroshi =

Downslope winds of Japan

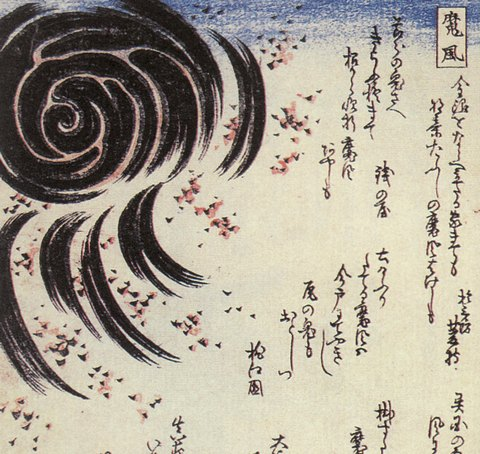
The Oroshi wind which causes unpredictable damage -- Mafū (魔風, lit. 'devilish wind', 1853)

Oroshi (颪, lit. 'down wind') is the Japanese term for a wind blowing strong down the slope of a mountain, occasionally as strong gusts of wind which can cause damage. Oroshi is a strong local wind across the Kanto Plain on the Pacific Ocean side of central Honshu. This term identifies a katabatic wind.

== Literary references ==
The Oroshi wind is mentioned in Japanese poetry, including a poem which is included in the Hyakunin Isshu.

ukarikeru
hito wo hatsuse no
yama-oroshi yo
hageshikare to ha
inoranu mono wo
— Minamoto no Toshiyori

Make that heartless
woman, O mountain storm
of Hatsuse Temple,
crueller still!" – this is not
what I prayed for, and yet ...

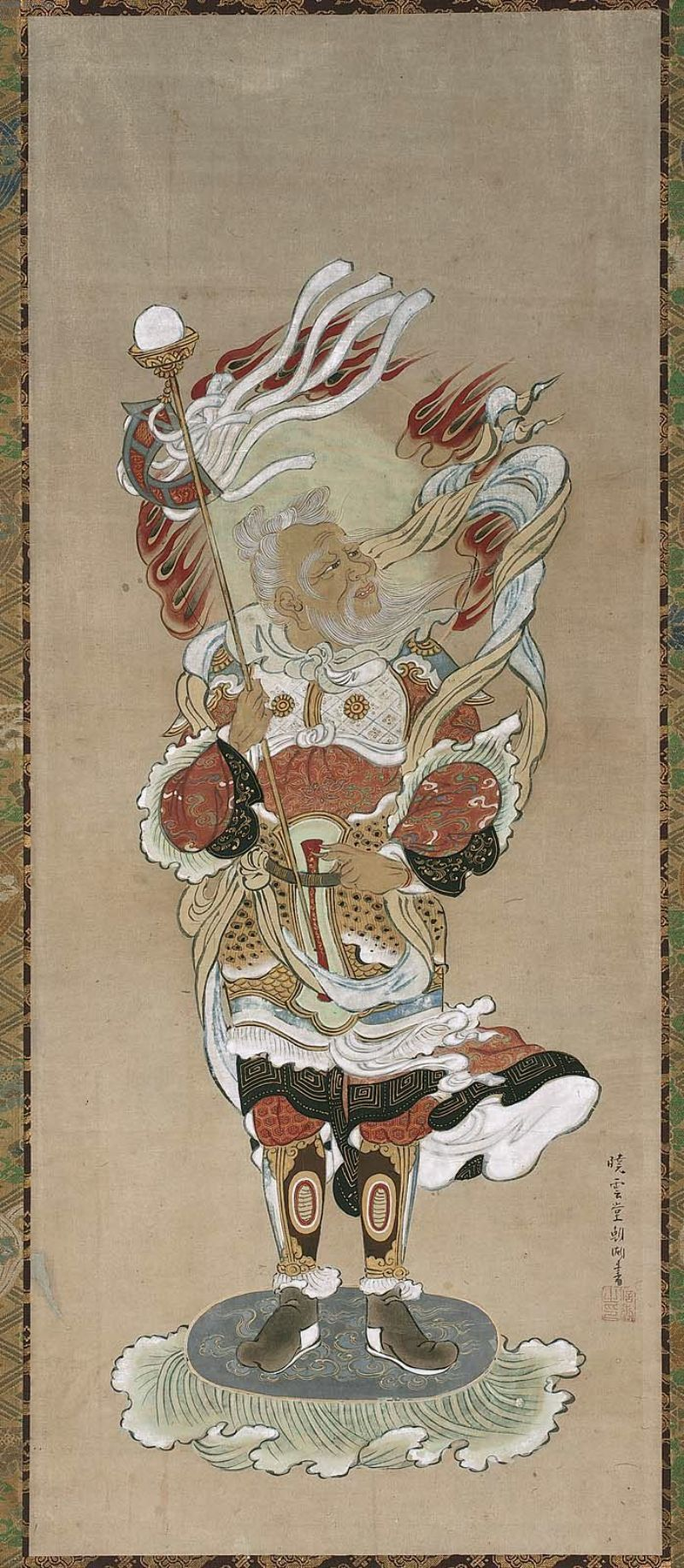
An impression of Futen the Wind Deity by Hanabusa Itcho, late-17th–early-18th century.

Many versions of this poem which were published during the Edo period have yama-oroshi instead of yama-oroshi yo, but the meaning is equivalent: the poet cries out to the wind; and he compares the cold down-draft to the heartless woman.

Oroshi is also a character in "La Horde du Contre-vent", an adventure book written by Alain Damasio, a French writer. In this story, Oroshi is the name of a wind mistress, she can read the wind as it is paper.

== See also ==
- Halny
- Piteraq – Cold katabatic wind in Greenland
- Santa Ana winds – California weather phenomenon
- Williwaw – Sudden blast of wind descending from a mountainous coast to the sea
