= Sermiligaaq =

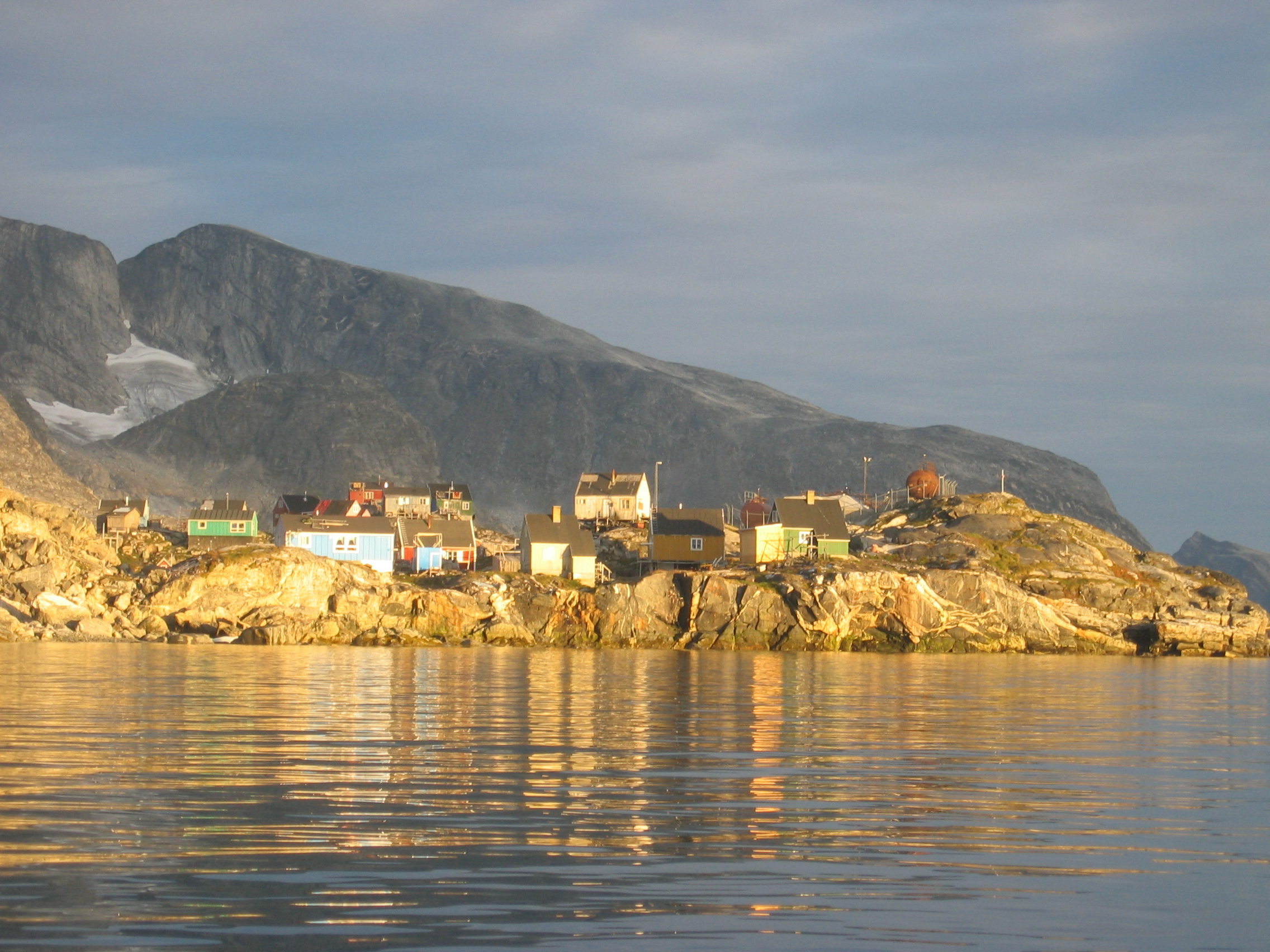
- Sermiligaaq

- Location within Greenland
- Coordinates: 65°54′26″N 36°22′46″W
- State: Kingdom of Denmark
- Constituent country: Greenland
- Municipality: Sermersooq

Government
  - Mayor: Anders Sanimuinnaq

Population (1 January 2025)
  - Total: 202
- Time zone: UTC−02:00 (Western Greenland Time)
  - Summer (DST): UTC−01:00 (Western Greenland Summer Time)
- Postal code: 3913 Tasiilaq

Sermiligaaq (old spelling: Sermiligâk´) is a settlement in the Sermersooq municipality in southeastern Greenland. It is located near the Sermilik Fjord. Its population was 202 in 2025. In Kalaallisut, its name means "Beautiful Glacierfjord".

== Geography ==
The small island of Quujuutilik (also spelled Kujutilik or Qûjûtilik) is located off the coast northeast of Sermiligaaq.

== Transport ==
The settlement is served by the Sermiligaaq Heliport.

== Population ==
The population of Sermiligaaq has slowly increased in the last two decades, unlike in the neighboring settlements of Kuummiit and Kulusuk.

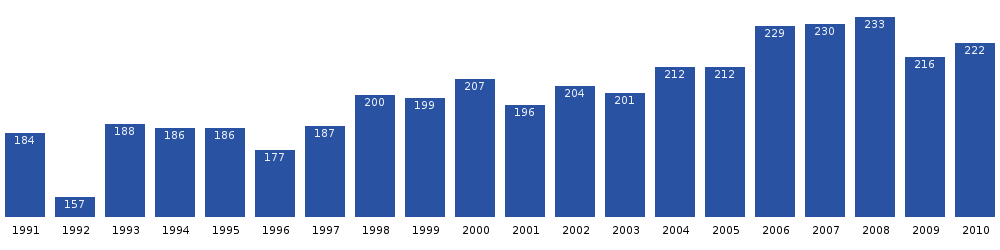
Sermiligaaq population growth dynamics in the last two decades. Source: Statistics Greenland
