= Kapisillit =

Settlement in Greenland

Kapisillit Laksene
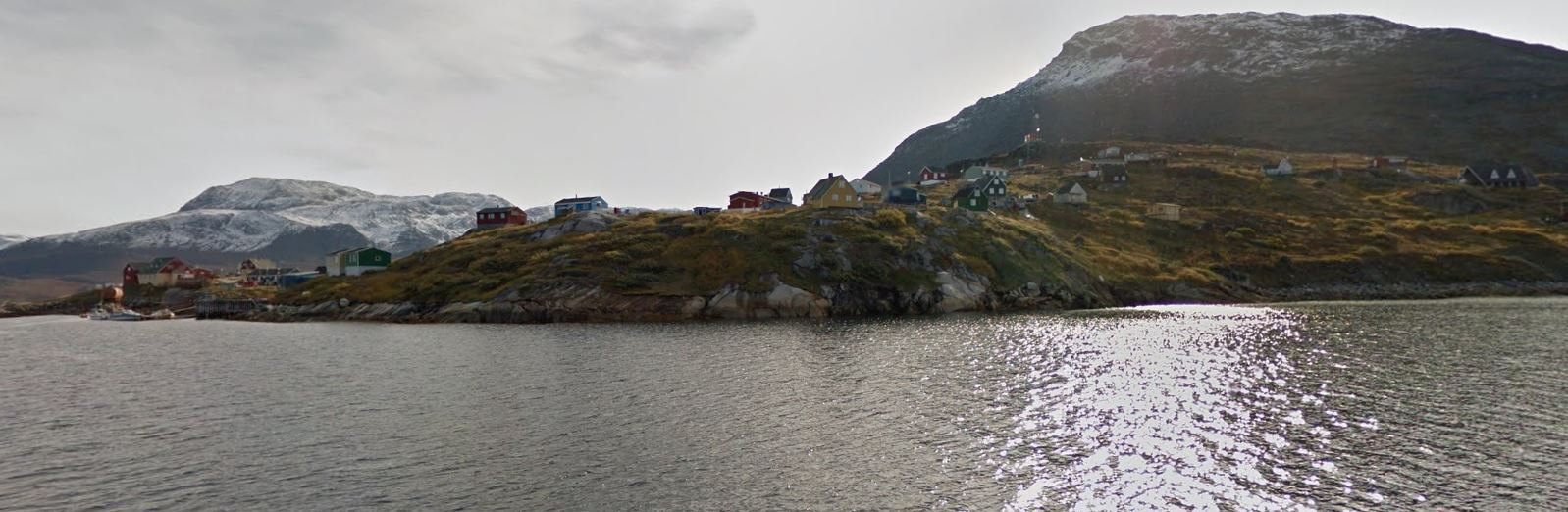

- Location within Greenland
- Coordinates: 64°26′10″N 50°16′10″W
- State: Kingdom of Denmark
- Constituent country: Greenland
- Municipality: Sermersooq

Government
  - Mayor: Morten Johnsen

Population (2025)
  - Total: 52
- Time zone: UTC−02:00 (Western Greenland Time)
  - Summer (DST): UTC−01:00 (Western Greenland Summer Time)
- Postal code: 3900 Nuuk

Kapisillit (Danish: Laksene) is a settlement in the Sermersooq municipality in southwestern Greenland. The settlement had 43 inhabitants in 2024. Kapisillit means "the salmon" in the Greenlandic language (Danish: laksene). The name refers to the belief that the only spawning-ground for salmon in Greenland is a river near the settlement.

== Geography ==
Kapisillit is located 75 km (47 mi) northeast of Nuuk, near the head of Kapisillit Kangerluaq, one of the tributary fjords of the 160 km (99.4 mi) long, Nuup Kangerlua, the longest fjord on the Labrador Sea coast of Greenland, and one of the longest in the inhabited part of the country.

== Economy ==
The inhabitants mostly subsist on hunting, fishing and tourism. The settlement has its own school, church, and grocery store.

=== Transport ===
Transport to Kapisillit is done by boat. Helicopter is sometimes used. There is no road from outside to Kapisillit, although there are plans to build a simple road from Nuuk to Kapisillit.

== Population ==
The population of Kapisillit has declined by nearly a third relative to the 2000 levels, levelling off since. As of 1 January 2024, the settlement had 43 inhabitants.

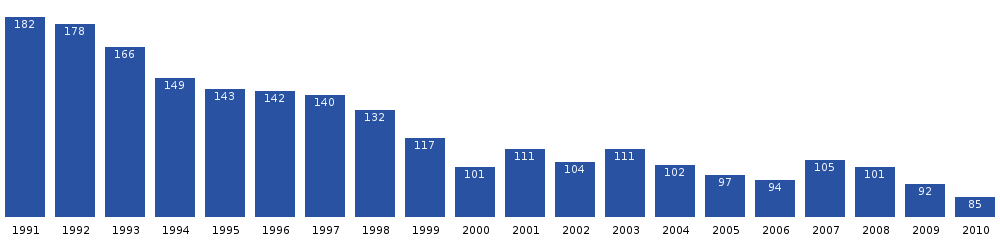
Kapisillit population decline dynamics in the last two decades. Source: Statistics Greenland
