= Piteraq =

Cold katabatic wind in Greenland

A piteraq is a cold katabatic wind which originates on the Greenlandic icecap and sweeps down the east coast. The word "piteraq" means "that which attacks you" in the local language. Piteraqs are most common in the autumn and winter. Wind speeds typically reach 50 to 80 m/s (180–288 km/h; 111–178 mph).

== Causes ==
The Greenland ice sheet cools the air directly above it. Colder air is denser, and it sinks, forming a separate layer of cold air in between warmer air. A piteraq is triggered by low pressure systems off the east coast of Greenland. Piteraqs affect not only coastal towns, but also large areas of the sea to the east of Greenland.

On February 6, 1970, at about 6:00 PM, the community of Tasiilaq was hit by the worst documented piteraq ever in Greenland (estimated at 90 m/s — about 325 km/h or 200 mph, stronger than a Category Five Atlantic hurricane), causing severe damage. Since the beginning of 1970, special piteraq warnings have been issued by the Danish Meteorological Institute.

Although piteraqs can be caused by low pressure systems off the east coast of Greenland, their formation is a combination of several factors: the temperature on the Greenland ice sheet, the conditions in the fjords, and the current atmospheric conditions. When a low-pressure system is approaching the coast of Greenland it generally has strong winds that can "suck" in air off the Greenland ice sheet, causing a piteraq. Mild piteraqs are far more common than severe ones; on average, there are 1-3 severe piteraqs in the Tasiilaq region yearly, and usually dozens of weaker events.

== Current research ==
Due to the fact that piteraqs occur in such an isolated and sparsely populated area, research on their cause is lacking. As of 2023 there are several ongoing studies on piteraqs, but the data has not yet been made available to the public.

At the Sermilik Station near Sermilik Station, the Piteraq is (as of 2023) being researched.

== Notable occurrences ==
The most notable and easily the most powerful piteraq to strike Tasiilaq occurred on February 6, 1970, when the wind speeds were estimated at 325 km/h. Another notable piteraq happened on September 26, 2022, but was much less powerful and long lasting, with sustained winds up to 160 km/h and gusts up to 210 km/h. This storm was said to cause some damage to the town such as broken windows and removed shingles and siding.

== See also ==
- Williwaw
- Santa Ana winds (Southern California)
- Oroshi (Japan)

Mediterranean Sea:

- Bora (wind)
- Mistral (wind)
