= Itterajivit =

- Location within Greenland
- Coordinates: 70°27′32″N 22°19′45″W
- State: Kingdom of Denmark
- Constituent country: Greenland
- Municipality: Sermersooq
- Abandoned: 2005
- Time zone: UTC−02:00 (Western Greenland Time)
  - Summer (DST): UTC−01:00 (Western Greenland Summer Time)

Itterajivit (also Ittaajimmiut or Igterajivit), formerly Kap Hope, was a small village in the Sermersooq municipality in eastern Greenland. It was abandoned in late 2005. It was the last remaining populated settlement outside Ittoqqortoormiit, located on Liverpool Land, across the Rosenvinge bay to the west of the town. It was featured in the Canadian TV show Departures.
