= Fall wind =

Type of wind

A fall wind is a type of downslope wind. Like katabatic winds, it is driven by the flow of an elevated, high-density (usually cold) air mass into a lower-density (warmer) air mass, but the term fall wind is restricted to the cases where the cold air mass is not due to radiative cooling of a slope, but to the presence of a dense air mass at the top of a slope. A well-known example of a fall wind is the Bora in the Adriatic sea region, to the extent that the term "bora wind" is sometimes used to designate a fall wind. Additional examples include the (Mount) Athos fall wind in Greece and the Marinada in Catalonia.

The presence of the dense (cold) air mass at the top can be caused by various meteorological phenomena, such as the arrival of a cold front, or from the advection of cool marine air by a sea breeze. The flow of the dense air mass during fall winds events is similar to the flow of water over a dam, with a hydraulic jump found downstream.
