= Antoni Pérez Moya =

Antoni Pérez i Moya (1884–1964) was a Spanish choral conductor and composer of Catalan descent. One of his best known pieces is Marinada. His son es:Antoni Pérez Simó (1920–1996) continued his educational work and was also a composer.
