= Ittoqqortoormiit Municipality =

Ittoqqortoormiit Scoresbysund
- Municipality
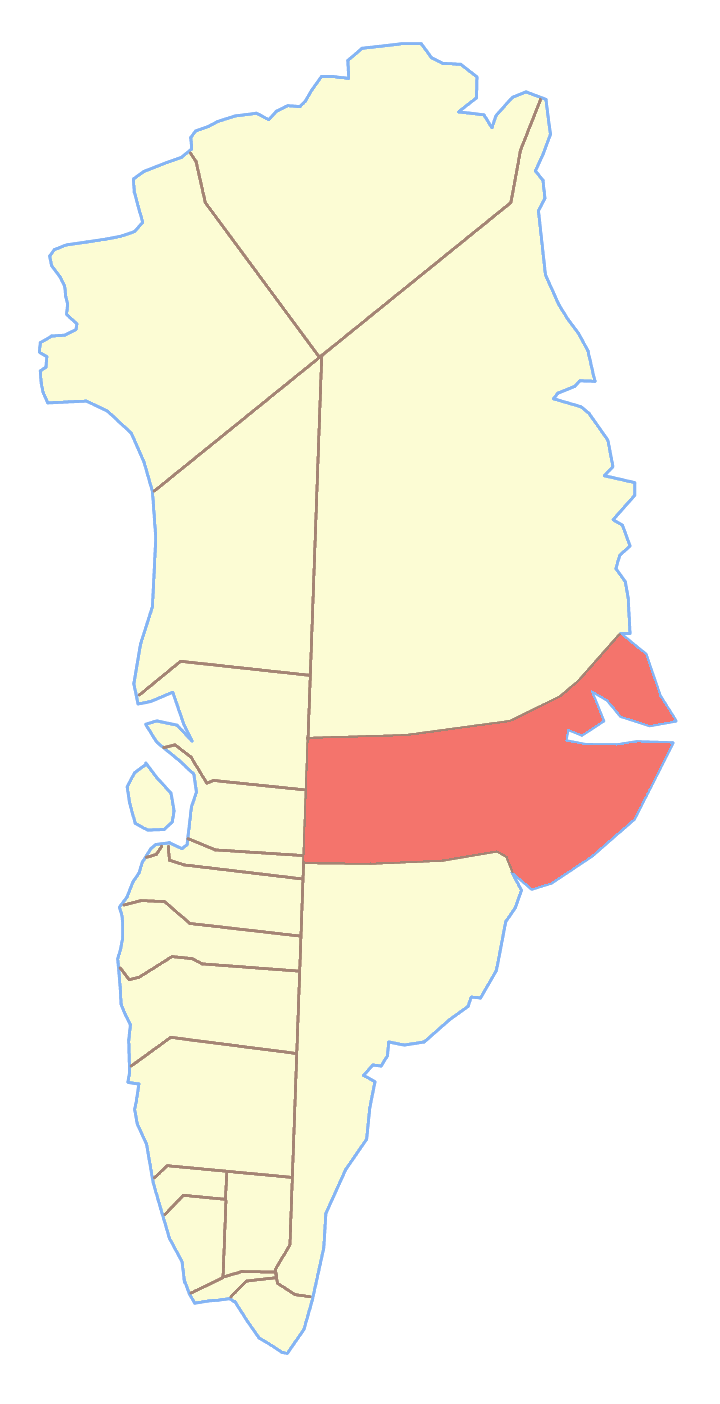

- Flag Seal
- Interactive map of Ittoqqortoormiit
- Coordinates: 70°29′8″N 21°58′1″W
- Country: Kingdom of Denmark
- Province: Greenland
- Municipality: Sermersooq

Area
  - Total: 235,000 km^{2} (91,000 sq mi)

Population (2005)
  - Total: 546

Ittoqqortoormiit Municipality (Greenlandic pronunciation: [itːɔqːɔʁtɔːʁmiːt]) was one of the two municipalities of East Greenland. Since 1 January 2009 it has been incorporated into the Sermersooq municipality. It encompassed an area of 235,000 km^{2} (91,000 sq mi) along the Denmark Strait and the Greenland Sea. Before the creation of the Northeast Greenland National Park in 1974, the former municipality had been much bigger (935,000 km^{2}), formally encompassing the largely uninhabited area to the north up to the border with Avannaa (North Greenland).

Population is 537 (as of 2005). Besides the main town of Ittoqqortoormiit, only one more populated village was located within the former municipality, Itterajivit, 14 km to the west across Rosenvinge Bugt, with a population of only 9 (as of 2005).
