= Ivittuut Municipality =

Ivittuut
- Municipality
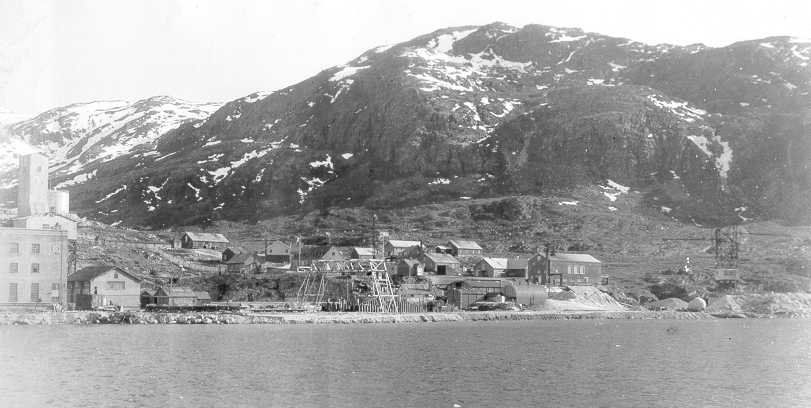
- The cryolite mine Ivigtut, Greenland, summer 1940

- Coat of arms
- Interactive map of Ivittuut
- Coordinates: 61°11′37″N 48°09′23″W
- Country: Kingdom of Denmark
- Province: Greenland
- County: Kitaa

Area
  - Total: 100 km^{2} (39 sq mi)

Ivittuut Greenlandic pronunciation: [ivitːuːt], (old spelling Ivigtût) was a municipality (from 1951 until 2008), on the coast of Arsuk Fjord in southern Greenland. With an area of just 100 km^{2} (600 km^{2} according to other sources), it was the smallest municipality of Greenland, bordering on the former Narsaq municipality in the north, east and south, and on the west by the Labrador Sea. It has been integrated into the new Sermersooq municipality. Due to its small size, the municipality is all ice-free, as it does not extend inward to the ice sheet of Greenland.

The town of Ivittuut is abandoned and the only settlement of the municipality is the permanent naval base Kangilinnguit (Grønnedal). The municipality existed de jure and was about to be absorbed by Narsaq when the 2009 municipal reform took place.

Kangilinnguit is the Danish naval headquarters of Greenland, originally established to protect Ivittuut's cryolite mine.

== Climate ==
Climate data for Ivittuut
Month	Jan	Feb	Mar	Apr	May	Jun	Jul	Aug	Sep	Oct	Nov	Dec	Year
Mean daily maximum °C (°F)	−4 (24)	−3 (26)	−1 (31)	3 (38)	8 (47)	12 (54)	14 (57)	13 (55)	8 (47)	4 (40)	0 (32)	−3 (27)	4 (40)
Mean daily minimum °C (°F)	−11 (12)	−11 (12)	−9 (16)	−4 (24)	1 (33)	4 (39)	6 (42)	5 (41)	2 (36)	−2 (29)	−6 (22)	−9 (16)	−3 (27)
Average precipitation mm (inches)	84 (3.3)	66 (2.6)	86 (3.4)	64 (2.5)	89 (3.5)	81 (3.2)	79 (3.1)	94 (3.7)	150 (5.9)	140 (5.7)	120 (4.6)	79 (3.1)	1,130 (44.6)
Source: Weatherbase
