= Tiilerilaaq =

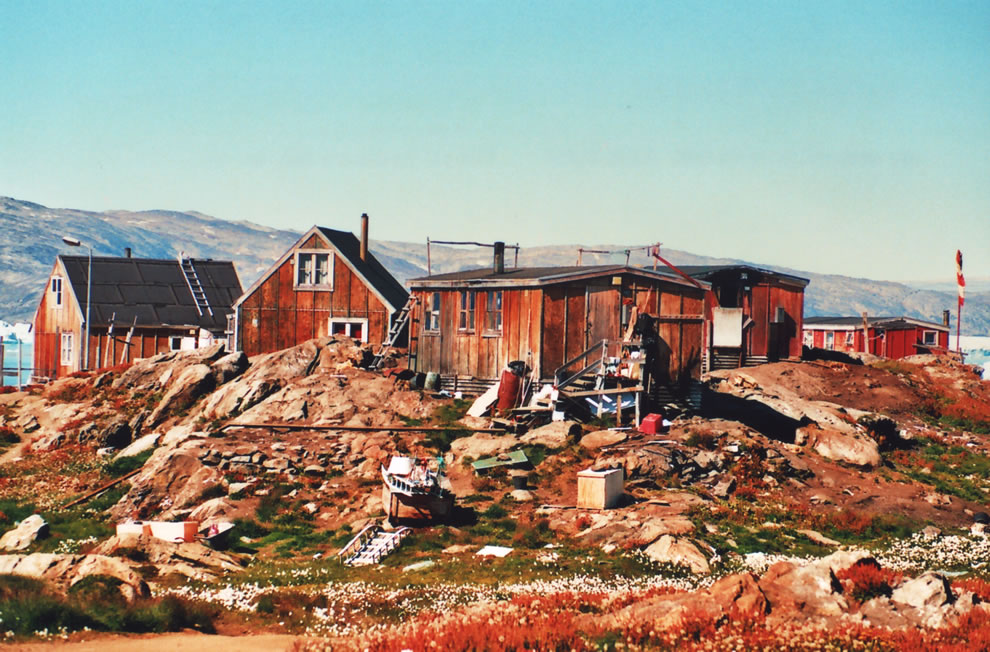
- Wooden houses in Tiilerilaaq

- Location within Greenland
- Coordinates: 65°53′20″N 37°46′45″W
- State: Kingdom of Denmark
- Constituent country: Greenland
- Municipality: Sermersooq

Government
  - Mayor: Pele Maratse

Population (2020)
  - Total: 96
- Time zone: UTC−02:00 (Western Greenland Time)
  - Summer (DST): UTC−01:00 (Western Greenland Summer Time)
- Postal code: 3913 Tasiilaq

Tiilerilaaq (formerly Tiniteqilaaq) is a settlement in the Sermersooq municipality, in southeastern Greenland. Its population was 96 in 2020.

== Population ==
The population of Tiilerilaaq has decreased by 54 percent relative to the 1991 levels, and by 34 percent relative to the 2000 levels, reflecting the depopulation of the nearby Kuummiit and Isortoq.

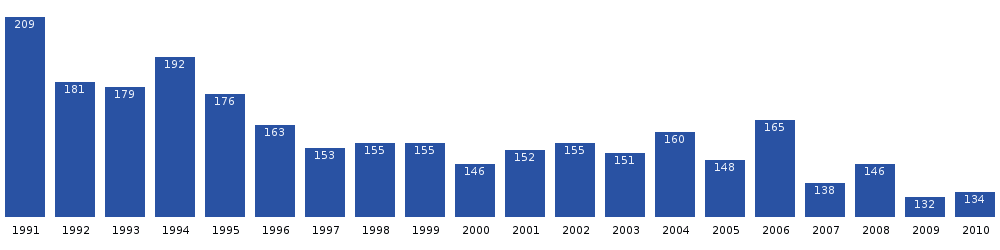
Tiilerilaaq population growth dynamics in the last two decades. Source: Statistics Greenland

== Transport ==
During weekdays Air Greenland serves the village by helicopter as part of government contract, with flights from Tiniteqilaaq Heliport and Kulusuk Airport.
