= KANUKOKA =

Former national association of Greenland's municipalities

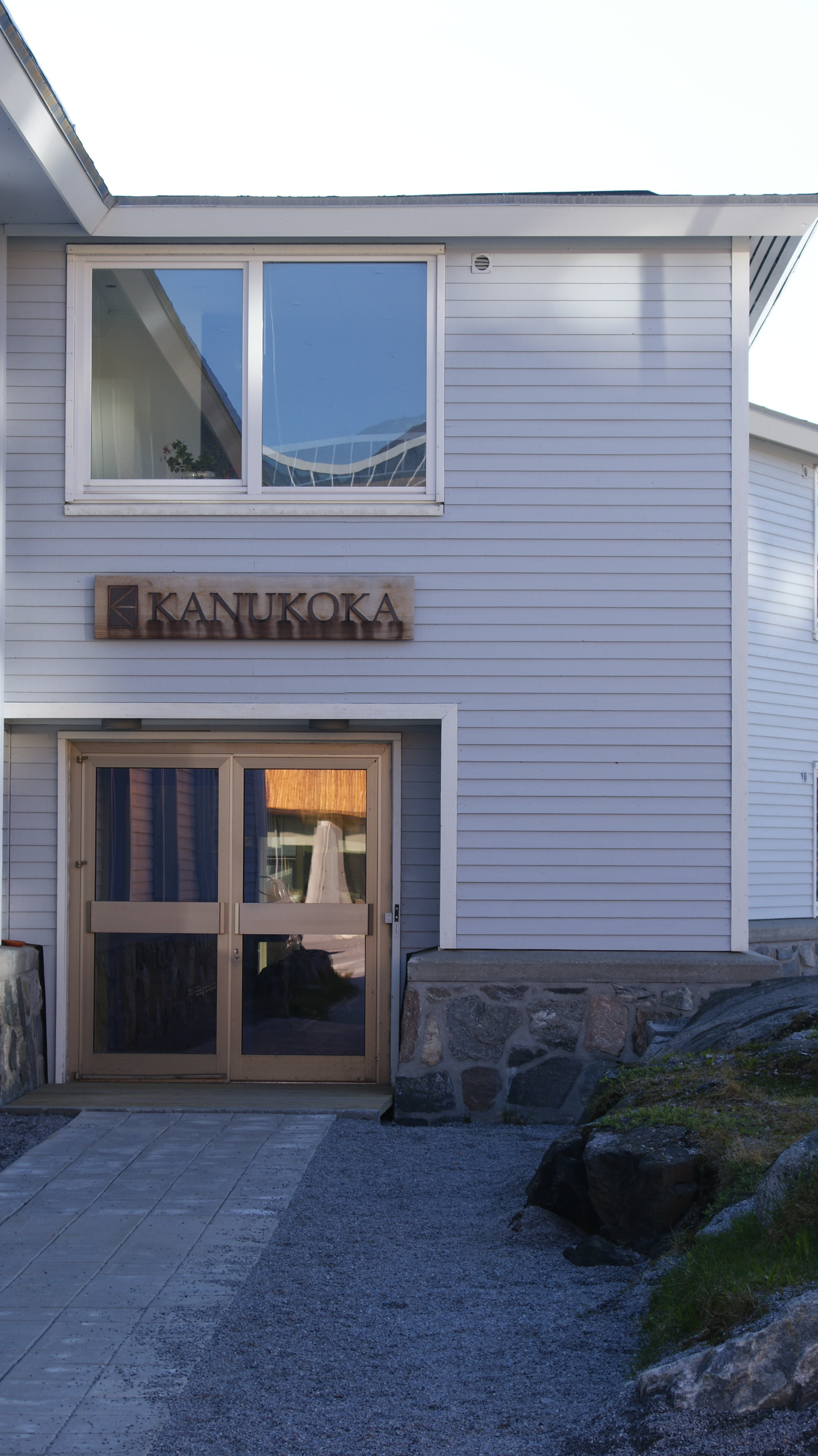
KANUKOKA's former headquarters in the Nuuk Centrum.

KANUKOKA (Greenlandic: Kalaallit Nunaanni Kommunit Kattuffiat, Danish: De Grønlandske Kommuners Landsforening) was the national association of Greenland's municipalities, led by Palle Jeremiassen. The name was an acronym formed from the first two letters of each of the constituent words of the now defunct organization's name in the Greenlandic language.

The aim of the organization was to facilitate cooperation between the municipalities of Greenland. Previously based in Nuuk, the organization ran the municipal elections every four years, with the last election taking place in 2016. All municipal authorities in Greenland were members of the organization up until its 2018 dissolution. The association was overseen by the Minister for Social Affairs in the Government of Greenland (Greenlandic: Naalakkersuisut). In 2010 the annual budget of the association was 12.5 million Danish kroner (DKK), with the funds coming directly from municipal budgets.

== History ==
KANUKOKA was founded on 24 July 1972, at which time there were 18 municipalities and 3 counties. After the administrative reform of 2008 was executed on 1 January 2009, there remained only four municipalities of Greenland, while the counties were discontinued. Two of the new municipalities—Qaasuitsup and Sermersooq—were the world's largest and second largest municipalities, in that order, with an area of 660,000 km^{2} (254,827.4 mi^{2}) and 531,900 km^{2} (205,367.7 mi^{2}), respectively.

The formation of new municipalities brought new challenges to the association, with some of its tasks taken over by the new administrative entities. In light of the extensive reduction of scope, the association was perceived as an expensive and redundant layer of bureaucracy, hampering the direct cooperation between the municipalities and the government. There was an ongoing discussion over its future, with a possible refocus from an independent organization to one being a vehicle for coordination of growth and development within the municipalities. The proposed changes were part of the ongoing reform of the public sector in Greenland under the new government, in office following the 2009 parliamentary elections. However, following the withdrawal of Sermersooq, and the division of Qaasuitsup into Avannaata and Qeqertalik, the organisation was dissolved on Tuesday, 31 July, 2018. As such there is no longer an organization governing the relations between Greenland's municipalities, and their representative mayors cooperate with each other on a case by case basis.
