= Mittivakkat Glacier =

Glacier in Greenland

Coordinates: 65.69°N 37.84°W

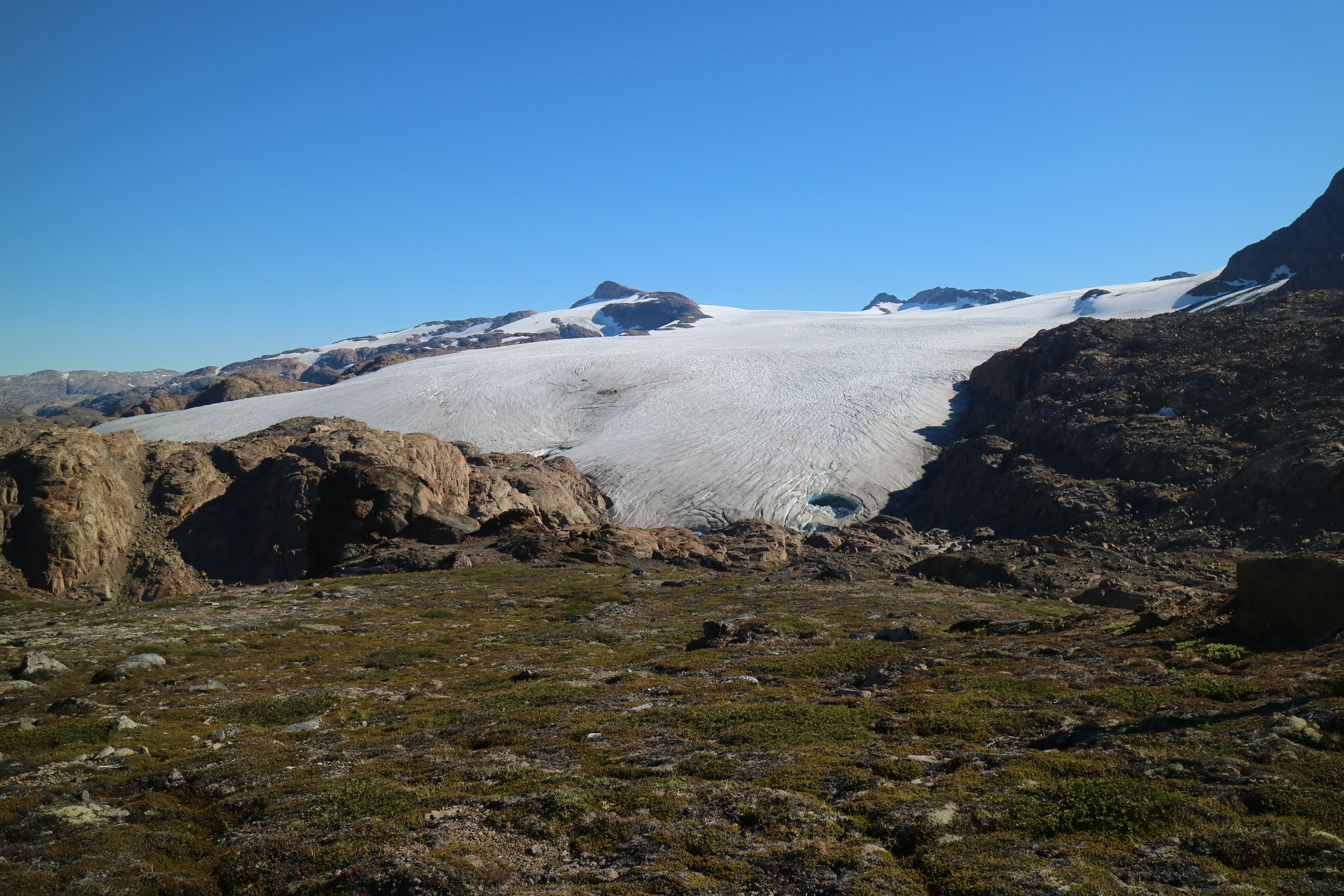
The glacier seen from the southwest (August 2016)

The Mittivakkat Glacier is located in southeast Greenland, and is part of the largest ice field on Ammassalik Island. This glacier has been in retreat (negative net mass balance) throughout most of recorded history (1898–2008).

The ice mass, which was first geodetically surveyed in 1933, is considered to be the most extensively studied glacier in Greenland that is not connected to the Greenland ice sheet. The starting point for glaciological, climatological and geomorphological research activities is the nearby Sermilik station, which is jointly operated by the University of Copenhagen and the University of Graz.

Reindeer bones were recovered from the retreating glacier in 2005, and dated to about 1200-1300 AD.
