= Paamiut Municipality =

Paamiut Municipality was a municipality in Greenland until 31 December 2008. Its area was mostly incorporated into the new Sermersooq municipality, while a part of the ice sheet including a few nunataks was incorporated into the new Kujalleq municipality. The central town was Paamiut (Greenlandic pronunciation: [paːmiut]). Other settlements within its borders were Arsuk and Neria.
