= Marinada (wind) =

The Marinada is a fall wind occurring mostly during summer in the Urgell region of Catalonia, in Spain. It blows from the south-east and usually arrives in the late afternoon. It is known by local people as a relief from the summer heat.

== Usage ==
The term Marinada may sometimes be used in Catalan to refer to a sea breeze in the general sense. However, it is in the inland comarcas of Catalonia that the term is most commonly used, and refers to this specific fall wind (which originates from a sea breeze).

== Mechanisms ==
The Marinada originates from the flow of a cool marine air mass in the eastern Ebro basin (as indicated by its name). This marine air mass is first driven inland by the sea breeze during the morning and early afternoon. If there is no strong background wind, it reaches the top of the Catalan Pre-Coastal Range around mid-afternoon. At this stage, the cool and dense marine air mass is neighbouring the continental air mass of the Ebro basin, which is hot and lighter since it has been strongly heated by the sun. The difference in density correlates with a difference in pressure, which accelerates the marine air into the Ebro basin, creating the Marinada. The flow of the Marinada is similar to the flow of water over a dam, and the marinada is therefore close to the ground. The vertical extent of the Marinada is about 200m high, and the wind speed at 2m is between 4 and 7 m/s.

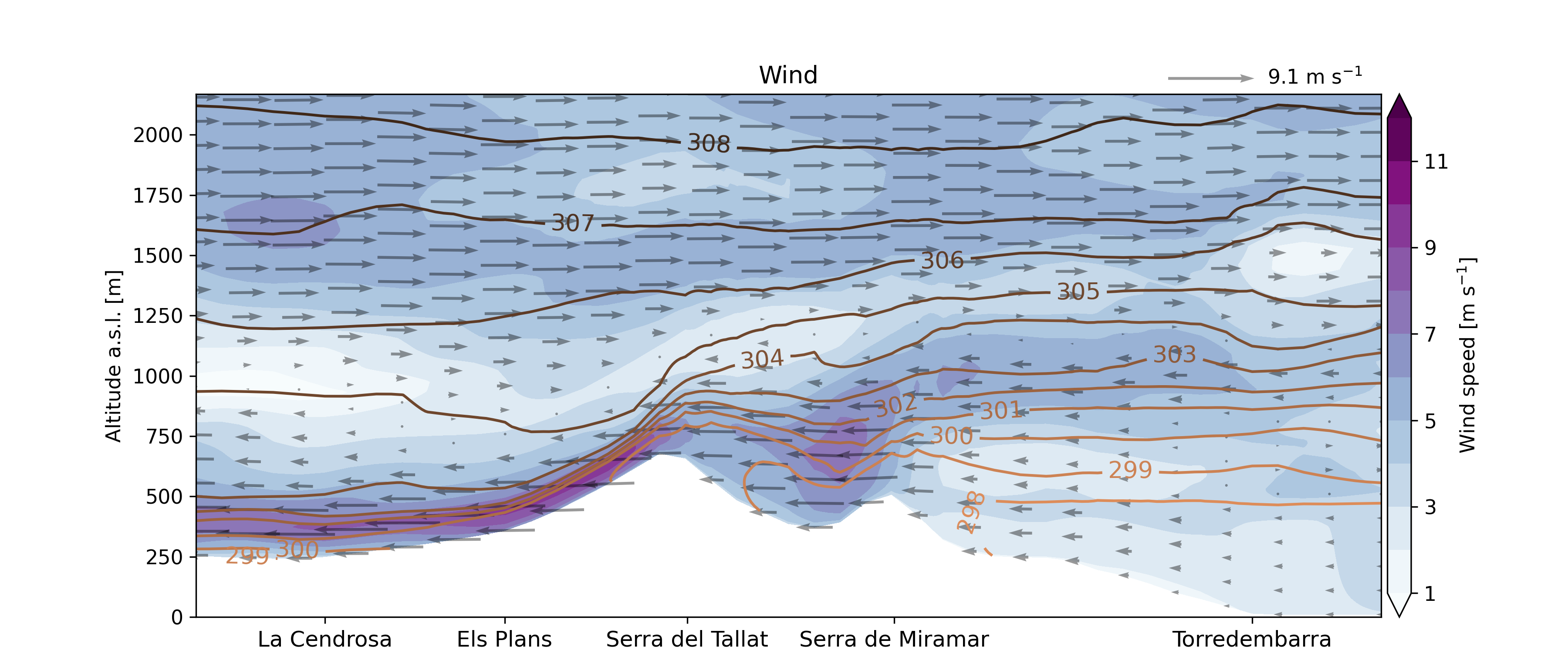
Cross-section of a Marinada event modelled by the Meso-NH atmospheric research model. The sea is on the right, the Ebro basin on the left, and in the middle are the Serras part of the Catalan Pre-Coastal Range. The isolines represent the virtual potential temperature, showing the fact that the air mass on the right is cooler and denser than the air mass on the left. The arrows and the color correspond to the wind and show the fact that the dense marine air flows into the Ebro basin.
