= Kuummiit =

Kuummiit Kuummiut
- Settlement
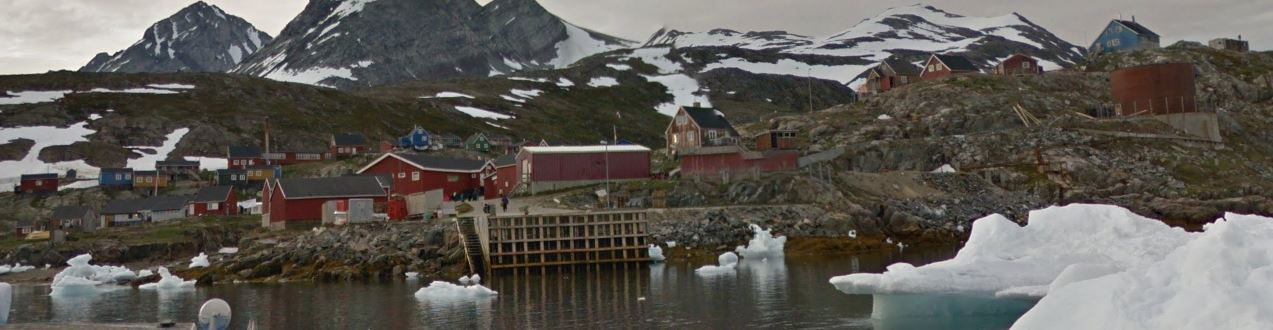
- View of Kuummiit

- Location within Greenland
- Coordinates: 65°51′55″N 37°00′30″W
- State: Kingdom of Denmark
- Constituent country: Greenland
- Municipality: Sermersooq
- Founded: 1915

Government
  - Mayor: Anders Sanimuinnaq
- Elevation: 49 m (161 ft)

Population (2020)
  - Total: 248
- Time zone: UTC−02:00 (WGT)
  - Summer (DST): UTC−01:00 (WGST)
- Postal code: 3913 Tasiilaq

Kuummiit (Kalaallisut: Kuummiut) is a settlement in the Sermersooq municipality in southeastern Greenland. Founded in 1915, it had 248 inhabitants in 2020.

== Geography ==
The settlement is located on the eastern shore of the Ammassalik Fjord, approximately 40 km (25 mi) to the northeast of Tasiilaq and 34 km (21 mi) to the north of Kulusuk.

== Population ==
The population of Kuummiit has decreased by more than 27% relative to its 1990 level and almost 15% relative to its 2000 level.

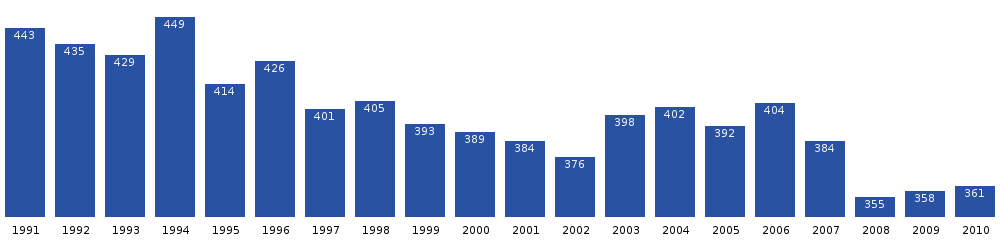
Kuummiit population growth dynamics, 1991-2010. Source: Statistics Greenland

== Transports ==
The settlement is served by the Kuummiit Heliport (IATA: KUZ, ICAO: BGKM).
