= Administrative divisions of Greenland =

Greenland is divided into five municipalities and two unincorporated areas. The municipalities are Avannaata, Kujalleq, Qeqertalik, Qeqqata, and Sermersooq. Northeast Greenland National Park is a huge unincorporated area that is outside the municipalities and larger than any of them. Pituffik Space Base is a small unincorporated enclave surrounded by the Avannaata municipality and administered by the United States Space Force.

== Current municipalities ==
Administrative divisions of Greenland since 2018

Name	Municipal center	Coat of arms	ISO	Population	Area (km^{2})	Density
Avannaata	Ilulissat		GL-AV	10,989	522,700	0.02
Kujalleq	Qaqortoq		GL-KU	6,110	32,000	0.2
Qeqertalik	Aasiaat		GL-QT	5,969	62,400	0.11
Qeqqata	Sisimiut		GL-QE	9,179	115,500	0.08
Sermersooq	Nuuk		GL-SM	24,229	531,900	0.04

== History ==
Greenland was divided into two inspectorates in 1782 – North Greenland, with its capital at Godhavn (now called Qeqertarsuaq), and South Greenland, with its capital at Godthaab (now Nuuk). These were directed by inspectors until 1924, then by governors. The two divisions were amalgamated in 1950 and the administration centralized at Godthaab.

=== Divisions and national park ===
For statistical and some regulatory purposes the country was divided into three divisions (landsdele) in 1951: West Greenland, North Greenland and East Greenland. The large Northeast Greenland National Park was established in 1974, encompassing the northern part of East Greenland, and amended with the eastern part of North Greenland in 1988.

With the advent of home rule in 1979, the names were Greenlandicized to Kitaa, Tunu, and Avannaa. By 2008, Kitaa had 15 municipalities, Tunu had 2, and Avannaa 1.

=== Municipalities ===
In 1908, Greenland was divided into 63 municipalities with elected municipal councils. After the modernization phase started in the 1950s these were consolidated, and by 1979 there were 18 municipalities.

The structural reform on 1 January 2009 created four enlarged municipalities. Of these, Qaasuitsup Kommunia, the largest, was partitioned on 1 January 2018 to form the new municipalities of Avannaata and Qeqertalik.

==== Kitaa (West Greenland) ====
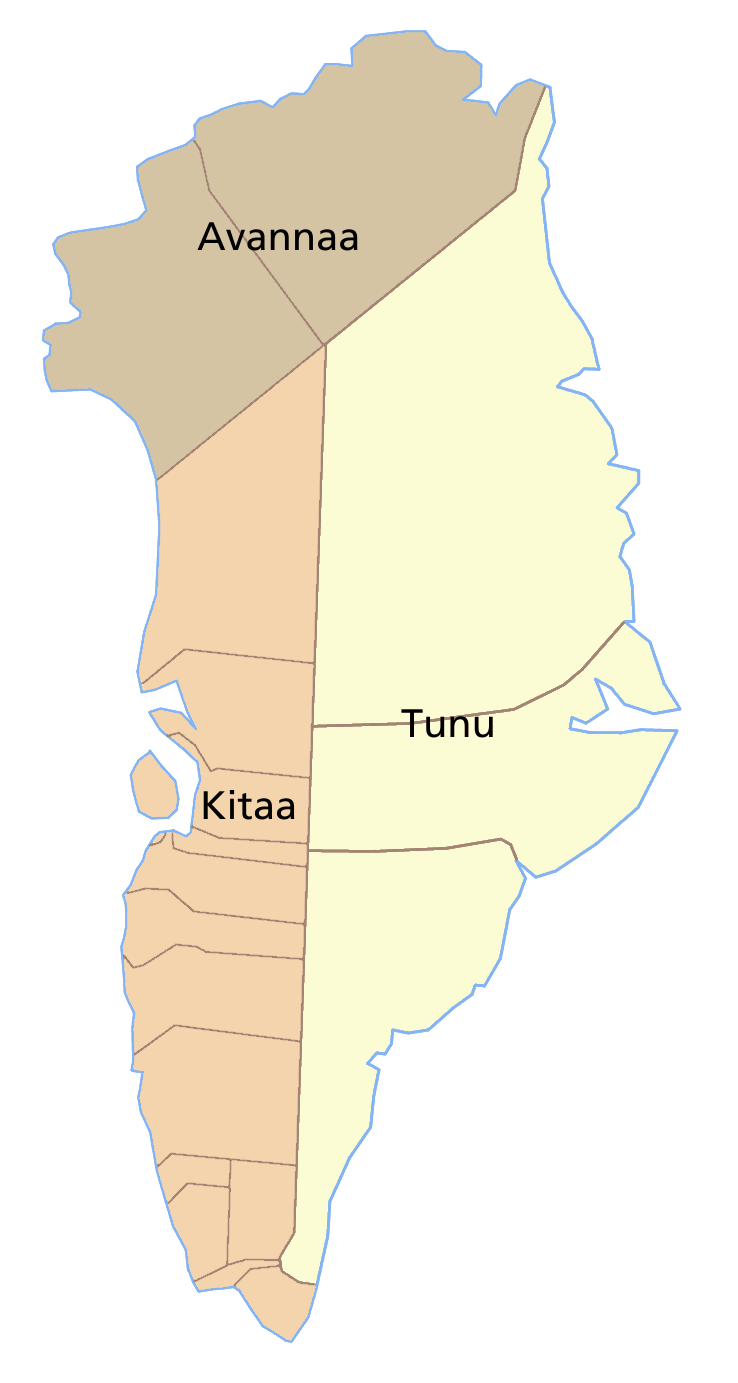
The three former counties, including the boundaries of the former municipalities and the Northeast Greenland National Park area

Southern part:

- Nanortalik Municipality
- Qaqortoq Municipality
- Narsaq Municipality
- Ivittuut Municipality
- Paamiut Municipality

Central part:

- Nuuk Municipality
- Maniitsoq Municipality
- Sisimiut Municipality
- Kangaatsiaq Municipality
- Aasiaat Municipality
- Qasigiannguit Municipality
- Ilulissat Municipality
- Qeqertarsuaq Municipality

Northern part:

- Uummannaq Municipality
- Upernavik Municipality

==== Tunu (East Greenland) ====
- Ammassalik Municipality
- Ittoqqortoormiit Municipality
- Northeast Greenland National Park (southern part) (unincorporated)

==== Avannaa (North Greenland) ====
- Qaanaaq Municipality
- Pituffik Space Base (Pituffik) (unincorporated)

== See also ==
- KANUKOKA, the municipalities' leadership council
- Subdivisions of the Nordic countries
- ISO 3166-2:GL
- ISO 3166-2:DK
