= Sermersooq =

Municipality of Greenland

- Municipality
- Sermersooq Municipality; Kommuneqarfik Sermersooq (Greenlandic); Sermersooq Kommune (Danish)
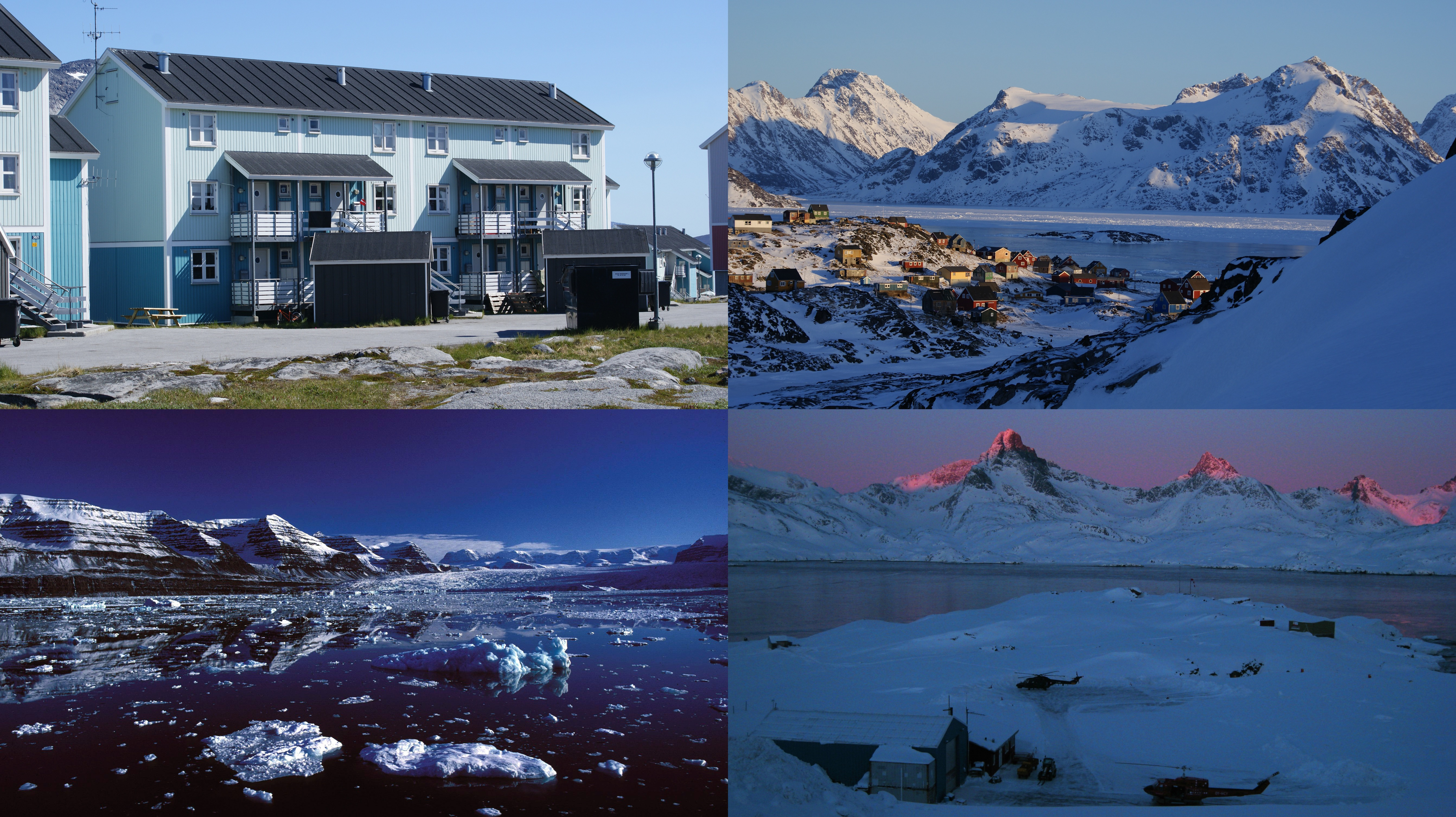
- Clockwise from top left: Nuuk, Kulusuk, Tasiilaq, Kangertittivaq

- Flag Coat of arms

- Location of Sermersooq within Greenland
- Coordinates (Sermersooq Commune): 66°00′N 40°00′W
- Sovereign state: Kingdom of Denmark
- Autonomous Territory: Greenland
- Established: 1 January 2009
- Municipal center: Nuuk

Government
  - Mayor: Avaaraq Olsen (Inuit Ataqatigiit)

Area
  - Total: 531,900 km^{2} (205,400 sq mi)

Population (1 January 2025)
  - Total: 24,229
  - Density: 0.04555/km^{2} (0.1180/sq mi)
- Time zone: UTC-02, UTC-01
- Calling code: +299
- ISO 3166 code: GL-SM
- Website: sermersooq.gl

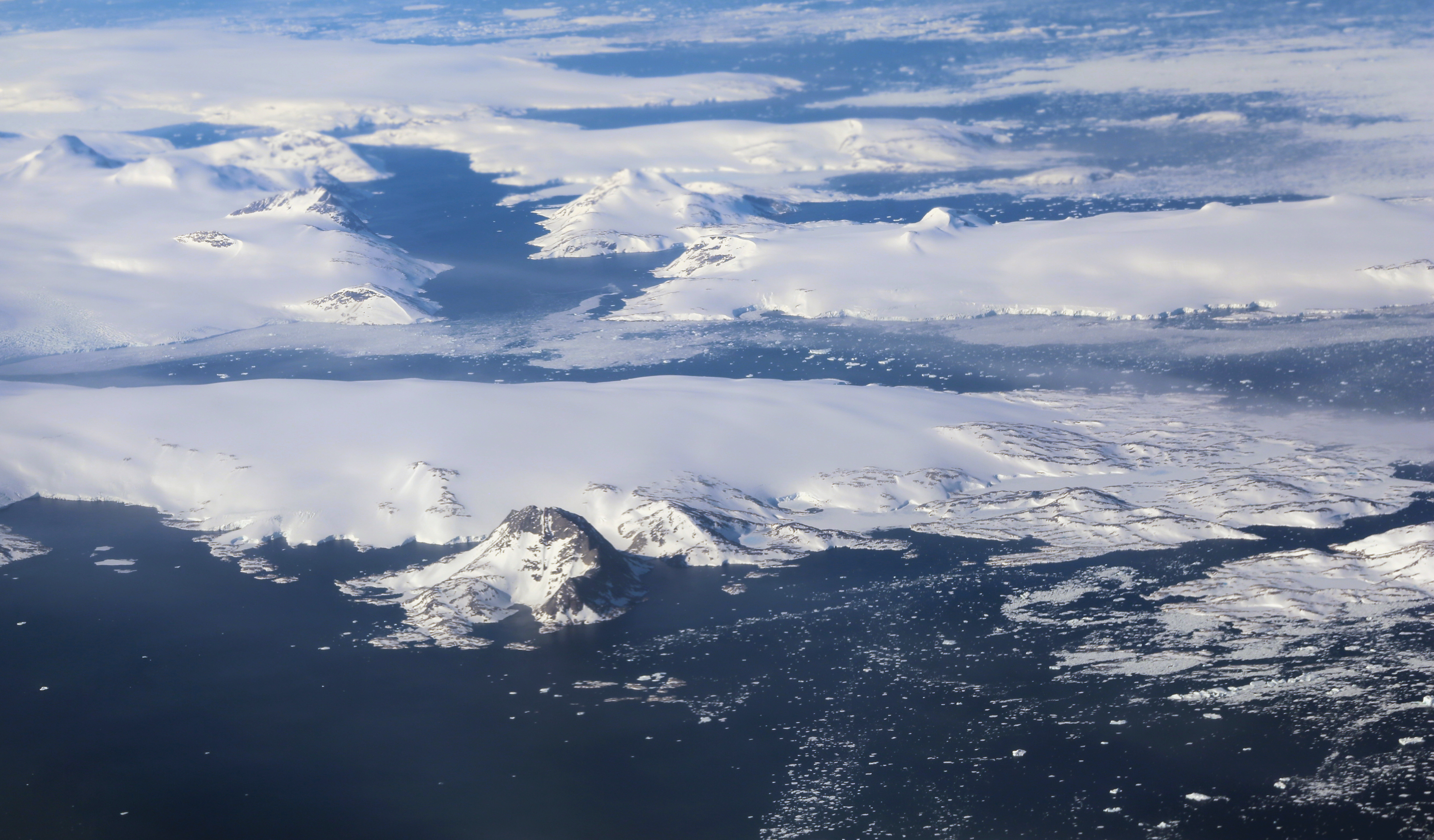
East coast of Sermersooq, just south of 64°N

Sermersooq (Greenlandic pronunciation: [sɜm.mɜs.sɔːq̚]) is a municipality in Greenland, formed on 1 January 2009 from five previous, smaller municipalities, and is the largest municipality in the world by area. Its administrative seat is the city of Nuuk, the capital of Greenland, and it is the most populous municipality in the country, with 24,229 inhabitants as of January 2025.

== Creation ==
The municipality consists of former municipalities of eastern and southwestern Greenland, each named after the largest settlement at the time of formation:

- Ammassalik Municipality
- Ittoqqortoormiit Municipality
- Ivittuut Municipality
- Nuuk Municipality
- Paamiut Municipality

== Administrative divisions ==
=== Ammassalik area ===
- Tasiilaq (Ammassalik)
- Kuummiit (Oscarshavn)
- Kulusuk (Kap Dan)
- Tiniteqilaaq
- Sermiligaaq
- Isortoq

=== Ittoqqortoormiit area ===
- Ittoqqortoormiit (Scoresbysund)
- Itterajivit

=== Ivittuut area ===
- Kangilinnguit (Grønnedal)

=== Nuuk area ===
- Nuuk (Godthåb)
- Kapisillit (Lakskaj)
- Qeqertarsuatsiaat (Fiskenæs)

=== Paamiut area ===
- Paamiut (Frederikshåb)
- Arsuk

== Geography ==
The municipality is located in south-central and eastern Greenland, with an area of 531,900 km^{2} (205,367.7 mi^{2}). As of 2018, it is the largest municipality in the world by area, following the split of the former Qaasuitsup municipality. As of January 2013, its population was 17,498. In the south, it is flanked by the Kujalleq municipality, with the border running alongside Alanngorsuaq Fjord. The waters flowing around the western coastline of the municipality are those of the Labrador Sea, which to the north narrows down to form Davis Strait separating the island of Greenland from Baffin Island. In the southwest, Ikka Fjord is best known for its eponymous ikaite columns, of a scale unknown anywhere else.

In the northwest, the municipality is bordered by the Qeqqata municipality, and further north by the Qeqertalik and Avannaata municipalities. The latter two borders however run north–south through the center (45° West meridian) of the Greenland ice sheet (Greenlandic: Sermersuaq) − and as such are free of traffic. In the north the municipality is bordered by the Northeast Greenland National Park beyond Cape Biot, at the northern end of Fleming Fjord. In the east, near the settlement of Ittoqqortoormiit, the municipal shores straddle the Kangertittivaq fjord, which opens to the cold Greenland Sea. The southeastern shores are bordered by the Anorituup Kangerlua fjord of the Irminger Sea in the North Atlantic Ocean.

== Politics ==
Sermersooq's municipal council consists of 19 members, elected every four years.

=== Municipal council ===
Election	Party						Total seats	Turnout	Elected mayor
Election	A	D	IA	N	S	...	Total seats	Turnout	Elected mayor
2008	2	5	7		6	1	21	56.8%	
2013	1	2	8		7	1	19	52.7%	Asii Chemnitz Narup (IA)
2017	1	3	9		6		19	55.8%	Charlotte Ludvigsen (IA)
2021		2	9	2	6		19	57.0%	Charlotte Ludvigsen (IA)
2025		4	7	1	7		19	44.5%	Avaaraq S. Olsen (IA) (IA-D coalition)
Data from Valg.gl

Charlotte Ludvigsen stepped down as mayor on 15 June 2022, Avaaraq S. Olsen was elected to replace her.

== Transport ==
Sermersooq is one of two municipalities straddling the western and eastern sides of the island, but is the only municipality where settlements on both coasts are connected via scheduled flights from Nuuk Airport to Kulusuk Airport and Nerlerit Inaat Airport and reverse, operated year-round by Air Greenland. There are also local flights between Nuuk and Paamiut Airport on the west coast.

== Language ==
Kalaallisut is the name of the West Greenlandic dialect is spoken in the towns and settlements of the western coast. Danish is also in use in the bigger towns. Tunumiit oraasiat, the East Greenlandic dialect, is spoken on the eastern coast.

== See also ==
- Ikka Fjord, located in the south of the region
- KANUKOKA
