= 1849 in paleontology =

Paleontology or palaeontology is the study of prehistoric life forms on Earth through the examination of plant and animal fossils. This includes the study of body fossils, tracks (ichnites), burrows, cast-off parts, fossilised feces (coprolites), palynomorphs and chemical residues. Because humans have encountered fossils for millennia, paleontology has a long history both before and after becoming formalized as a science. This article records significant discoveries and events related to paleontology that occurred or were published in the year 1849.

== Arthropods ==
=== Insects ===
Name	Novelty	Status	Authors	Age	Unit	Location	Notes	Images
Attopsis anthracina	Sp. nov	jr synonym	Heer	Burdigalian	Radoboj	Croatia	A formicine ant. jr synonym of Oecophylla obesa	
Attopsis longipennis	Sp. nov	valid	Heer	Burdigalian	Radoboj	Croatia	A formicine ant.	Attopsis longipennis
Attopsis longipes	Sp. nov	jr synonym	Heer	Burdigalian	Radoboj	Croatia	A formicine ant. jr synonym of Oecophylla obesa	
Attopsis nigra	Sp. nov	jr synonym	Heer	Burdigalian	Radoboj	Croatia	A formicine ant. jr synonym of Oecophylla obesa	
Formica imhoffii	Sp. nov	jr synonym	Heer	Burdigalian	Radoboj	Croatia	A formicine ant. jr synonym of Liometopum imhoffii	Formica imhoffii
Formica indurata	Sp nov	sr syn	Heer	Burdigalian	Radoboj	Croatia	A formicine ant. synonym of Camponotus induratus	Camponotus induratus
Formica longiventris	Sp nov	sr syn	Heer	Burdigalian	Radoboj	Croatia	An Amblyoponin ant. synonym of Casaleia longiventris	Casaleia longiventris
Formica ocella	Sp nov	Synonym	Heer	Burdigalian	Radoboj	Croatia	A dolichoderine ant. synonym of Emplastus (?) ocellus	
Formica ocella var paulo major	Sp nov	Synonym	Heer	Burdigalian	Radoboj	Croatia	A dolichoderine ant. synonym of Emplastus (?) ocellus	Formica ocella var paulo major
Formica schmidtii	Sp. nov	jr synonym	Heer	Burdigalian	Radoboj	Croatia	A formicine ant. jr synonym of Liometopum imhoffii	Formica imhoffii
Ponera affinis	Sp. nov	jr synonym	Heer	Burdigalian	Radoboj	Croatia	A formicine ant. jr synonym of Liometopum imhoffii	Ponera affinis
Ponera fuliginosa	Sp. nov	jr synonym	Heer	Burdigalian	Radoboj	Croatia	A formicine ant. jr synonym of Liometopum imhoffii	Ponera fuliginosa
Ponera fuliginosa oeningensis	Sp. nov	valid?	Heer	Miocene	Oeningen	Germany	A formicine ant?'	
Ponera fuliginosa radobojana	Sp. nov	jr synonym	Heer	Burdigalian	Radoboj	Croatia	A formicine ant. jr synonym of Liometopum imhoffii	Ponera fuliginosa radobojana
Plecia bucklandi	Sp. nov	Valid	Heer	Chattian		France	A bibionid	Plecia bucklandi
