= Kjer Glacier =

Glacier in Greenland

- Kjærs Bræ
- Location within Greenland
- Location: Melville Bay, Greenland
- Coordinates: 75°3′N 57°35′W
- Terminus: Melville Bay

Kjer Glacier is a tidewater glacier in the northwestern shore of Greenland. Administratively it belongs to Avannaata municipality.

== Geography ==
It drains the Greenland ice sheet (Greenlandic: Sermersuaq) southwestwards into Melville Bay south of the Steenstrup Glacier and north of the Hayes Glacier. The glacier front is located to the northwest of the Tuttulikassak nunatak, with the glacier constituting the northern end of Upernavik Archipelago.

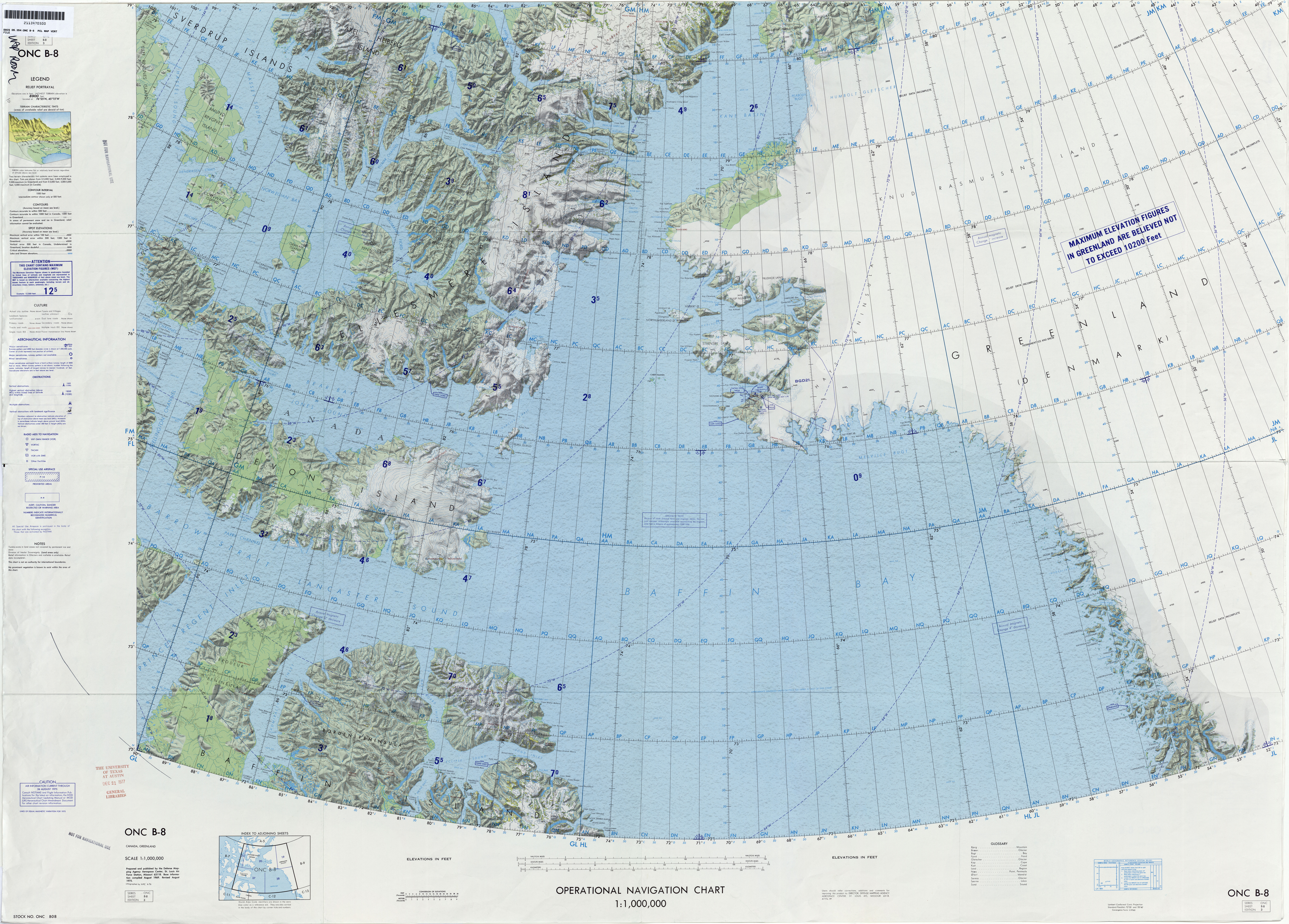
Map of Northwestern Greenland

=== Administrative border ===
Before the administrative changes on 1 January 2009 in the country, the border between the former Upernavik Municipality and the former Qaanaaq Municipality ran through Kjer Glacier. After that date both municipalities and the entire coast of Melville Bay were made part of Qaasuitsup municipality. Since 1 January 2018 it is part of Avannaata municipality.

== See also ==
- List of glaciers in Greenland
