= Steenstrup =

Steenstrup is a last name. Notable people with this last name include:

- Carl Steenstrup (1934–2014), Danish japanologist
- Christian Steenstrup (1873–1955), Danish inventor
- Henriette Steenstrup (born 1974), Norwegian actress, comedian, and screenwriter
- Hjalmar Steenstrup (1890–1945), Norwegian resistance member
- Japetus Steenstrup (1813–1897), Danish zoologist, biologist, and professor
- K. J. V. Steenstrup (1842–1913), Danish geologist
- Morten Steenstrup (1953–2025), Norwegian barrister and politician
- Paul Steenstrup Koht (1844–1892), Norwegian educator and politician
- Peter Severin Steenstrup (1807–1863), Norwegian naval officer and businessperson
- Poul Steenstrup (1772–1864), Norwegian industrialist and politician

== See also ==
- K.J.V. Steenstrup Glacier, a glacier in eastern Greenland
- Steenstrup Glacier, a glacier in northwestern Greenland
