= 1867 in paleontology =

Paleontology or palaeontology is the study of prehistoric life forms on Earth through the examination of plant and animal fossils. This includes the study of body fossils, tracks (ichnites), burrows, cast-off parts, fossilised feces (coprolites), palynomorphs and chemical residues. Because humans have encountered fossils for millennia, paleontology has a long history both before and after becoming formalized as a science. This article records significant discoveries and events related to paleontology that occurred or were published in the year 1867.

== Arthropods ==
=== Insects ===
| Name | Novelty | Status | Authors | Age | Unit | Location | Notes | Images |
|---|---|---|---|---|---|---|---|---|
| Camponotus induratus | Comb nov | valid | (Heer) | Burdigalian | Radoboj | Croatia | A formicine ant. New combination forFormica indurata | Camponotus induratus |
| Aphaenogaster fuliginosa | Comb. nov | jr synonym | (Heer) | Burdigalian | Radoboj | Croatia | A formicine ant. jr synonym of Liometopum imhoffii | |
| Aphaenogaster livida | Comb. nov | jr synonym | (Heer) | Burdigalian | Radoboj | Croatia | A formicine ant. jr synonym of Liometopum imhoffii | |
| Hypoclinea haueri | Sp nov | Synonym | Mayr | Burdigalian | Radoboj | Croatia | A dolichoderine ant. synonym of Emplastus haueri | |
| Liometopum antiquum | Sp nov | Synonym | Mayr | Burdigalian | Radoboj | Croatia | A dolichoderine ant. synonym of Emplastus antiquus | |
| Liometopum imhoffii | Comb. nov | Valid | (Heer) | Burdigalian | Radoboj | Croatia | A formicine ant | Liometopum imhoffii |
| Poneropsis affinis | Comb. nov | jr synonym | (Heer) | Burdigalian | Radoboj | Croatia | A formicine ant. jr synonym of Liometopum imhoffii | |
| Ponera livida | Sp. nov | jr synonym | Heer | Burdigalian | Radoboj | Croatia | A formicine ant. jr synonym of Liometopum imhoffii | |
| Ponera lugubris | Sp. nov | jr synonym | Heer | Burdigalian | Radoboj | Croatia | A formicine ant. jr synonym of Liometopum imhoffii | |
| Ponera morio | Sp. nov | jr synonym | Heer | Burdigalian | Radoboj | Croatia | A formicine ant. jr synonym of Liometopum imhoffii | |

== Archosauromorphs ==
=== Newly named dinosaurs ===
| Name | Status | Authors | Location | Notes | Images |
|---|---|---|---|---|---|
| Acanthopholis | Nomen dubium | Thomas Henry Huxley | UK | | |
| Orosaurus | Jr. synonym | Thomas Henry Huxley | | Junior subjective synonym of Euskelosaurus. | |

== Paleontologists ==
- Death of pioneering French paleontologist Jacques Amand Eudes-Deslongchamps.
