= Tuttulikassak =

Nunatak in Avannaata, Greenland

Coordinates: 74°56′30″N 57°14′00″W

Location within Greenland

Tuttulikassak (old spelling: Tugtulikavsak, Danish: Lille Renland) is a nunatak (Greenlandic: nunataq) in Avannaata municipality in northwestern Greenland.

== Geography ==
Tuttulikassak is one of several nunataks in the Melville Bay region of Greenland, where the Greenland ice sheet (Greenlandic: Sermersuaq) drains into the bay alongside its entire length apart from an occasional nunatak. Tuttulikassak is located on the mainland of Greenland in the northernmost part of Upernavik Archipelago, delimiting its northern end. To the east, Greenland icesheet drains southwards into Melville Bay via Hayes Glacier.

=== Administrative border ===
Before the administrative changes on 1 January 2009 in the country, the border between the former Upernavik Municipality and the former Qaanaaq Municipality ran approximately 7.7 km (4.8 mi) to the northwest of the nunatak, through Kjer Glacier. After that date both municipalities and the entire coast of Melville Bay were part of Qaasuitsup municipality.

Since 1 January 2018 it has been part of Avannaata municipality.
