= Jazvine =

Jazvine may refer to:

- Jazvine, Bosnia and Herzegovina, a village near Busovača
- Jazvine, Croatia, a village near Radoboj
