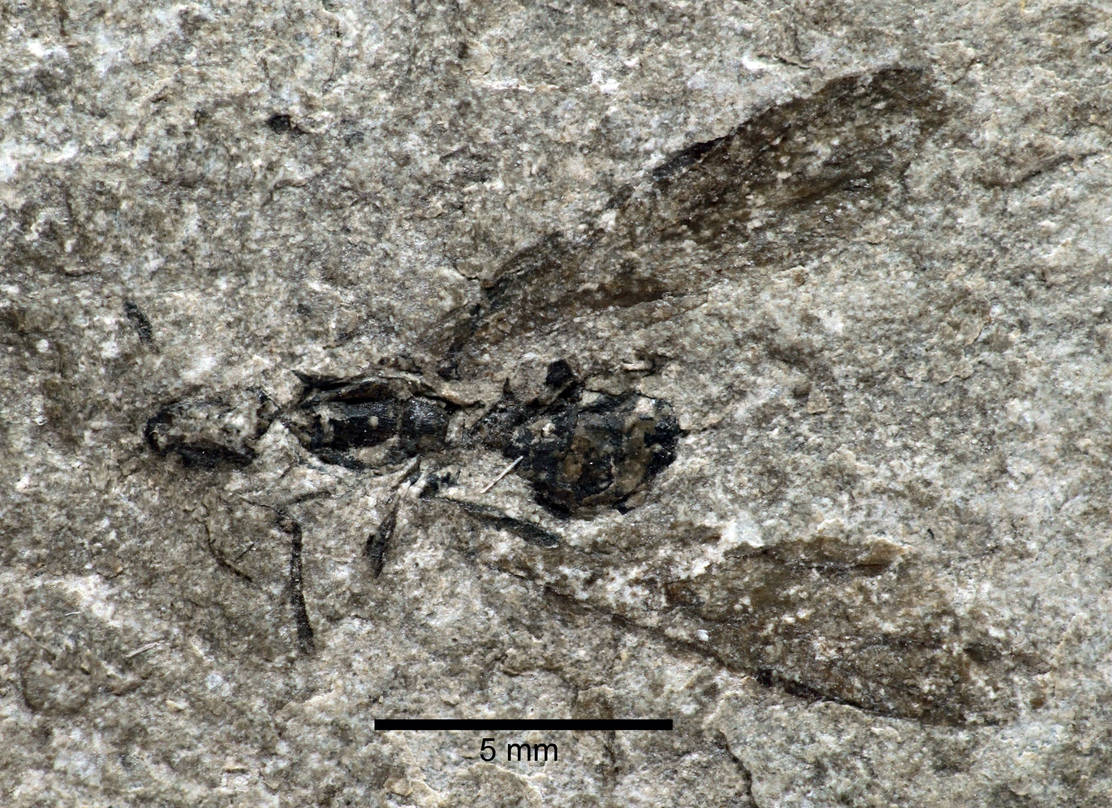
- Lectotype queen

Scientific classification
- Kingdom: Animalia
- Phylum: Arthropoda
- Clade: Pancrustacea
- Class: Insecta
- Order: Hymenoptera
- Family: Formicidae
- Subfamily: Formicinae
- Genus: †Attopsis; Heer, 1849
- Species: †A. longipennis

Binomial name
- †Attopsis longipennis Heer, 1849

= Attopsis =

Attopsis Temporal range: Burdigalian

Extinct genus of ants

Attopsis is an extinct genus of ants in the formicid subfamily Formicinae. While formerly containing a number of species, the genus is currently monotypic; the type species, Attopsis longipennis, is known from a single Early Miocene fossil found in what is now Croatia.

== History and classification ==
When described, the genus Attopsis was based on a group of 18 separate fossil ants, which were preserved as compression fossils in sedimentary rock from the Radoboj area of what is now Croatia. The deposits are the result of sedimentation in an inland sea basin, possibly a shallow lagoon environment, during the Burdigalian of the Early Miocene. Along with Attopsis, a diverse assemblage of several hundred species of insects has been preserved in the sediments, along with fish and algae. The fossil impressions are preserved in micrite limestones, resulting in low-quality preservation of fine details. The insect fossils were first studied by Oswald Heer, then a professor with the University of Zürich, who placed the fossils in a new genus Attopsis. The genus was based on the perceived structuring of the petiole as having two segments and the wing venation having an open mcu cell. Along with A. longipennis, Heer described three other species, A. anthracina, A. longipes, and A. nigra. The genus and many of the type specimens were reexamined and redescribed in 2014 by paleoentomologists Gennady Dlussky and Tatyana Putyatina, who determined that only the type specimen for A. longipennis matched a revised description of the genus, while all other fossils from the four species were redescribed as members of different genera. This revision resulted in only a single species in Attopsis. The type specimens for A. anthracina, A. longipes, and A. nigra match the description for males of the species Oecophylla obesa, and Dlussky and Putyatina designated the three species as junior synonyms of O. obesa.

== Description ==
The gyne for A. longipennis has a total length of 8.8 mm (0.35 in), with only one segment to the petiole, while the first segment of the gaster is not constricted as Heer originally reported. Three sets of paired spines are on the propodium, the pronotum, and the petiole, respectively. The head has antennae with elongated scapes that protrude past the rear margin of the head capsule and have flagellomeres that are longer than they are wide. The margins of the compound eyes are rounded and lacking occipital angles. The fore wings are elongated and narrowed, with a closed 3r cell, while both the rm and mcu cells are possibly absent.
