= Gustav Frederik Holm =

Danish officer and explorer

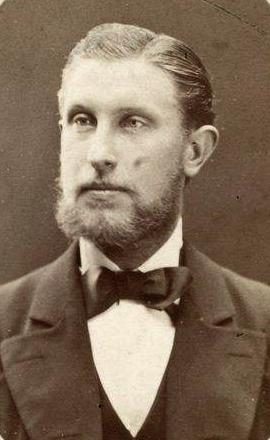
- Gustav Holm in 1883
- Born: 6 August 1849; Copenhagen, Denmark
- Died: 13 March 1940 (aged 90); Copenhagen, Denmark
- Relatives: His daughter Naja Marie Heiberg Holm (1887–1918) married Arctic explorer Ejnar Mikkelsen
- Military career
- Allegiance: Denmark
- Branch: Royal Danish Navy
- Service years: 1870–1919
- Rank: Frigate captain
- Commands: Arctic exploration Director of the Hydrographic Society
- Awards: Knight Commander of the Order of the Dannebrog; Prix de la Roquette of the Société de géographie Gold medal of the Royal Danish Geographical Society; Service Medal; Honorary membership of the Greenlandic Society (Grønlandske Selskab)

Gustav Frederik Holm (6 August 1849 – 13 March 1940) was a Danish naval officer and Arctic explorer born in Copenhagen.

== Career ==
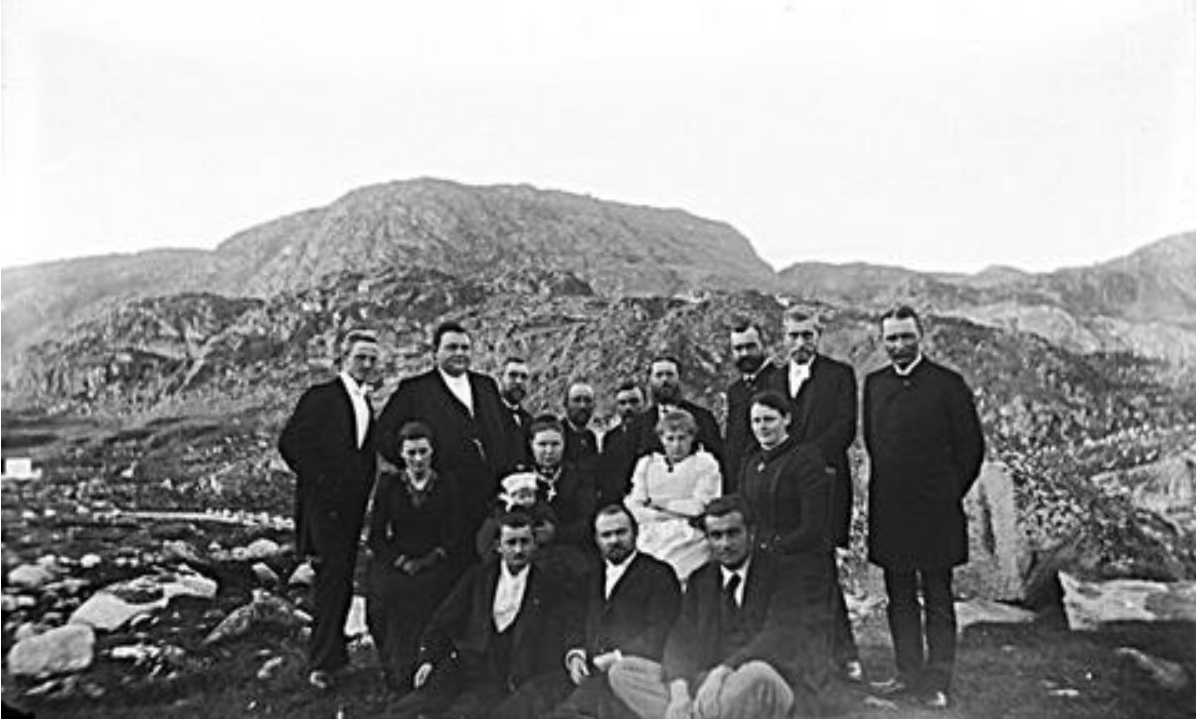
Gustav Holm (back row, third from left) at Qaqortoq, Greenland, in 1894, when he was captain of the steamer Hvidbjørnen

He was made commander in the navy in 1899, was chief of the hydrographic bureau from 1899 to 1909, and became director of pilots in 1912. He became distinguished for his explorations, especially of the east coast of Greenland. In 1876, he participated in K. J. V. Steenstrup's geological expedition to the Julianehåb District. From 1883 to 1885 he led the Umiak Expedition with T. V. Garde, exploring the east coast of Christian IX Land, as far as 66° 8' N using umiak boats. The expedition encountered 11 Inuit communities, numbering 431 inhabitants, who were previously unknown to Europeans, and discovered five great ice fiords. For his explorations he received gold medals from the Société de géographie, Paris (1891), and the Danish Geographical Society (1895), and the Danish Order of Merit (1909). The results and observations of the expeditions were published in Den danske Konebaads-Expedition til Grønlands Østkyst 1883–85 (1889) and Om de geografiske Forhold i dansk Østgrønland (1889).

== Posthumous honours ==
Cape Gustav Holm, Holm Island (Kiatassuaq) and Holm Land were named after him.

== Literature ==
- Holm, G. F. (1883). Beskrivelse af ruiner i Julianehaabs Distrikt, der ere undersøgte i aaret 1880 [Description of some ruins in the Julianehaab District investigated in the year 1880]. Meddelelser om Grønland (in Danish). Vol. 3.
- Holm, G. (1924). Small Additions to the Vinland Problem. In Consequence of Professor H. P. Steensby's "Norsemen's Route from Greenland to Wineland". Meddelelser om Grønland. Vol. 59.

== See also ==
- Cartographic expeditions to Greenland
- List of Arctic expeditions
- Ammassalik wooden maps
