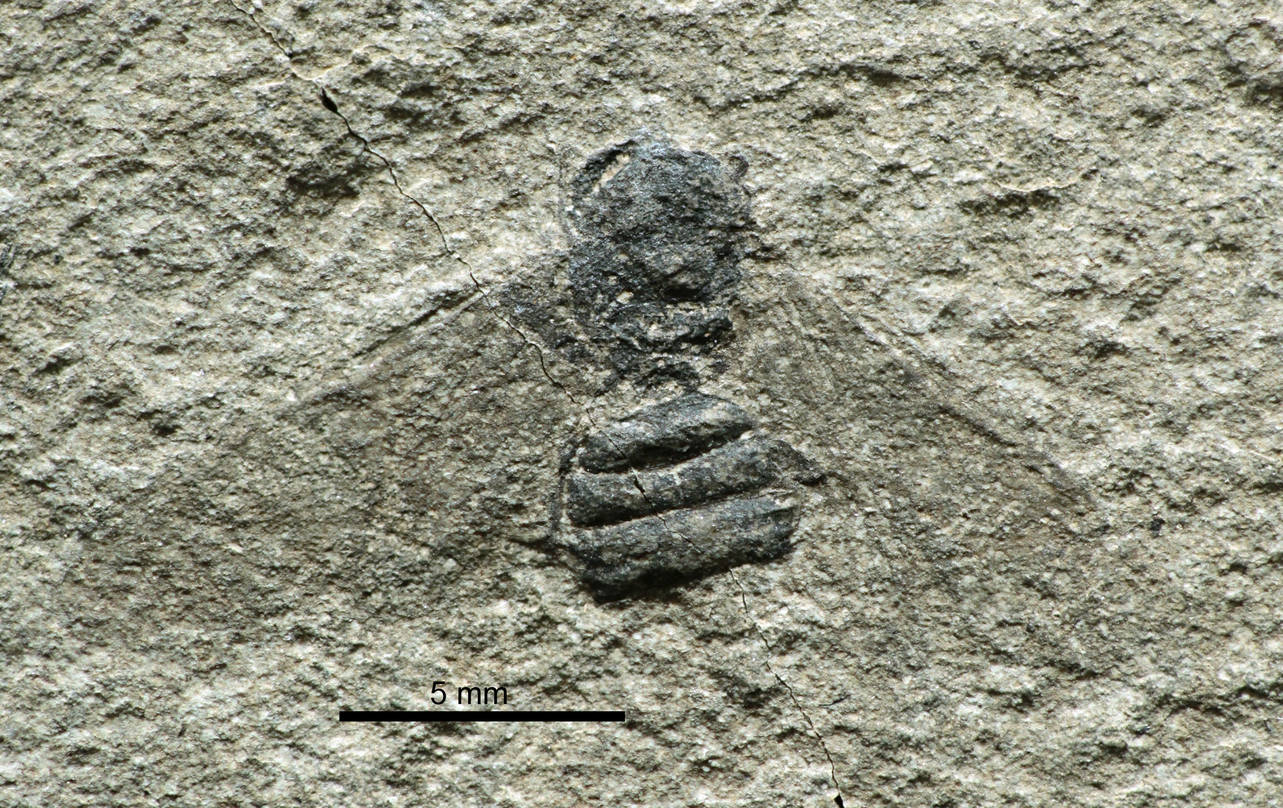
- L. imhoffii queen

Scientific classification
- Domain: Eukaryota
- Kingdom: Animalia
- Phylum: Arthropoda
- Class: Insecta
- Order: Hymenoptera
- Family: Formicidae
- Subfamily: Dolichoderinae
- Genus: Liometopum
- Species: †L. imhoffii

Binomial name
- †Liometopum imhoffii (Heer, 1849)

Synonyms
- Formica imhoffii Heer, 1849; Formica schmidtii Heer, 1849; Ponera affinis Heer, 1849; Ponera fuliginosa Heer, 1849; Poneropsis affinis (Heer, 1849); Poneropsis imhoffii (Heer, 1849); Poneropsis livida Heer, 1867; Poneropsis lugubris Heer, 1867; Poneropsis morio Heer, 1867; Poneropsis schmidtii (Heer, 1849); Aphaenogaster fuliginosa (Heer, 1849); Aphaenogaster livida (Heer, 1867)

= Liometopum imhoffii =

Liometopum imhoffii Temporal range: Burdigalian, Early Miocene

Species of ant

Liometopum imhoffii is an extinct species of ants in the dolichoderine genus Liometopum. The species was described from a number of Early Miocene fossils found in what is now Croatia.

== History and classification ==
The original group of fossils that the type species, and three other species, were described from are preserved as compression fossils in sedimentary rock from the Radoboj area of what is now Croatia. The deposits are the result of sedimentation in an inland sea basin, possibly a shallow lagoon environment, during the Burdigalian of the Early Miocene. Along with L. imhoffii a diverse assemblage of several hundred species of insects have been preserved in the sediments, along with fish and algae. The fossil impressions are preserved in micrite limestones, resulting in low quality preservation of fine details. The insect fossils were first studied by Oswald Heer, then a professor with the University of Zürich, who placed the fossils in four new ant species in two different genera, "Formica imhoffii", "Formica schmidtii", "Ponera fuliginosa radobojana", and "Ponera affinis". Based on the petiole structure and wing venation, Heer subsequently moved the four species to the new genus "Poneropsis" in 1867 as "Poneropsis affinis", "P. fuliginosa", "P. imhoffii", and "P. schmidtii". He also described three new species, "P. livida", "P. lugubris", and "P. morio". In the same year, entomologist Gustav Mayr of Vienna examined a number of fossils from Radoboj, some being the type specimens, others being identified by Heer but not types. Later in 1907 Anton Handlirsch revisited the work of Mayr and Heer in a monograph of fossil ants. In 2014 a series of 21 specimens, many of the type specimens plus additional fossils, were reexamined and redescribed by paleoentomologists Gennady Dlussky and Tatyana Putyatina.

Mayr examined eight of the Radoboj specimens belonging to the species "F. imhoffi" and "F. schmidtii", noting the similarity between the males of the two species, and that they likely belonged to the genus Liometopum. Following on Mayr's suggestion Handlirsch formally synonymized the two species, giving "P. imhoffii" seniority over "P. schmidtii", and moved the species to Liometopum.

Heer based the species "P. fuliginosa" on fossils from both Radoboj and Öhningen, Germany. When Mayr examined several of the specimens, he interpreted them to show a two segmented petiole, and moved both "P. fuliginosa" and "P. livida" to the genus Aphaenogaster. In contrast, Heer in 1867 moved the two species to his new genus "Poneropsis", a move that was followed by William Morton Wheeler in 1911 when he designated "P. fuliginosa" the type species of the genus. The single type specimen of "P. affinis" was preserved with a distorted head and wing proportions, from which Heer differentiated the species from "P. fuliginosa". Neither Mayr or Handlirsch were able to study the fossil, so they did not comment on the species status. However Dlussky and Putyatina concluded that the specimen did not differ from "P. fuliginosa" when the distortion of the fossil was accounted for, and included it as a junior synonym of L. imhoffii.

Following the research of Mayr and Handlirsch, Dlussky and Putyatina agreed with the placement in Liometopum. Based on examination of one of the "P. fuliginosa" type queens, and on Heer's illustrations, they also concluded "P. fuliginosa" was a junior synonym of L. imhoffii. Of all the species named, Dlussky and Putyatina were not able to examine the type specimens for "F. livida" and "P. morio", only other specimens looked at and identified by Heer. In both species, the examined fossils do not match the descriptions published by Heer, and either belong to other species, or are not well enough preserved to identify at all. Based on Heer's 1867 descriptions and illustrations Dlussky and Putyatina concluded that both are synonyms of Liometopum imhoffii.

Heer named L. imhoffii for his friend Ludwig Imhoff of Basel, Switzerland.

== Description ==
The queens of L. imhoffi range between 11.5–13.3 mm (0.45–0.52 in) in length with rectangular heads that are slightly wider than long. The sides of the head are convex in outline, while the rear margin curves inwards near the middle. The mesosoma is wider than the maximum width of the head and thick in construction, while the fore section of the mesonotum is large and the legs are robust and short. The petiole has a wide scale on the node and connects to an oval gaster.

The males are smaller than the queens, ranging between 8.5–9.5 mm (0.33–0.37 in) in length and having a much smaller head. The legs are longer and thinner than those of the queen, while the mesosoma is wider than the head, as in the queens. The males have a petiole that is low and triangular in outline, the node being only 1.5 times as high as long. Unlike the oval gaster of the queens the males have a more elongated egg shaped gaster.
