= Hayes Glacier (Greenland) =

Glacier in Greenland

- Hayes Gletscher
- Location within Greenland
- Location: Melville Bay, Greenland
- Coordinates: 74°57′N 57°5′W
- Terminus: Melville Bay

Hayes Glacier is a tidewater glacier in the Avannaata municipality, located on the northwestern shore of Greenland.

== Geography ==
It drains the Greenland ice sheet (Greenlandic: Sermersuaq) southwards into Melville Bay. The glacier front is located to the east of the Tuttulikassak nunatak and south of the Kjer Glacier.

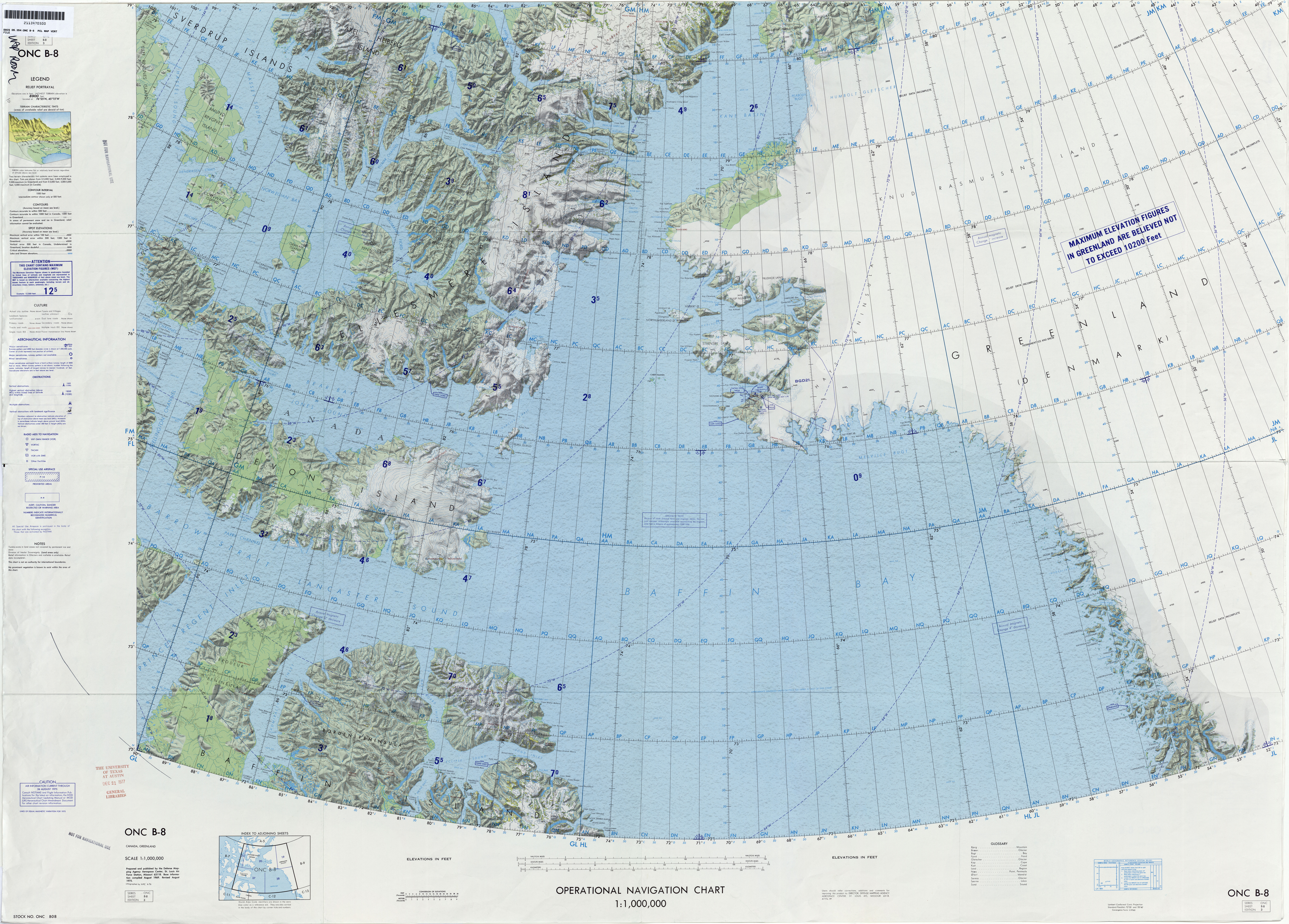
Map of Northwestern Greenland

== See also ==
- List of glaciers in Greenland
