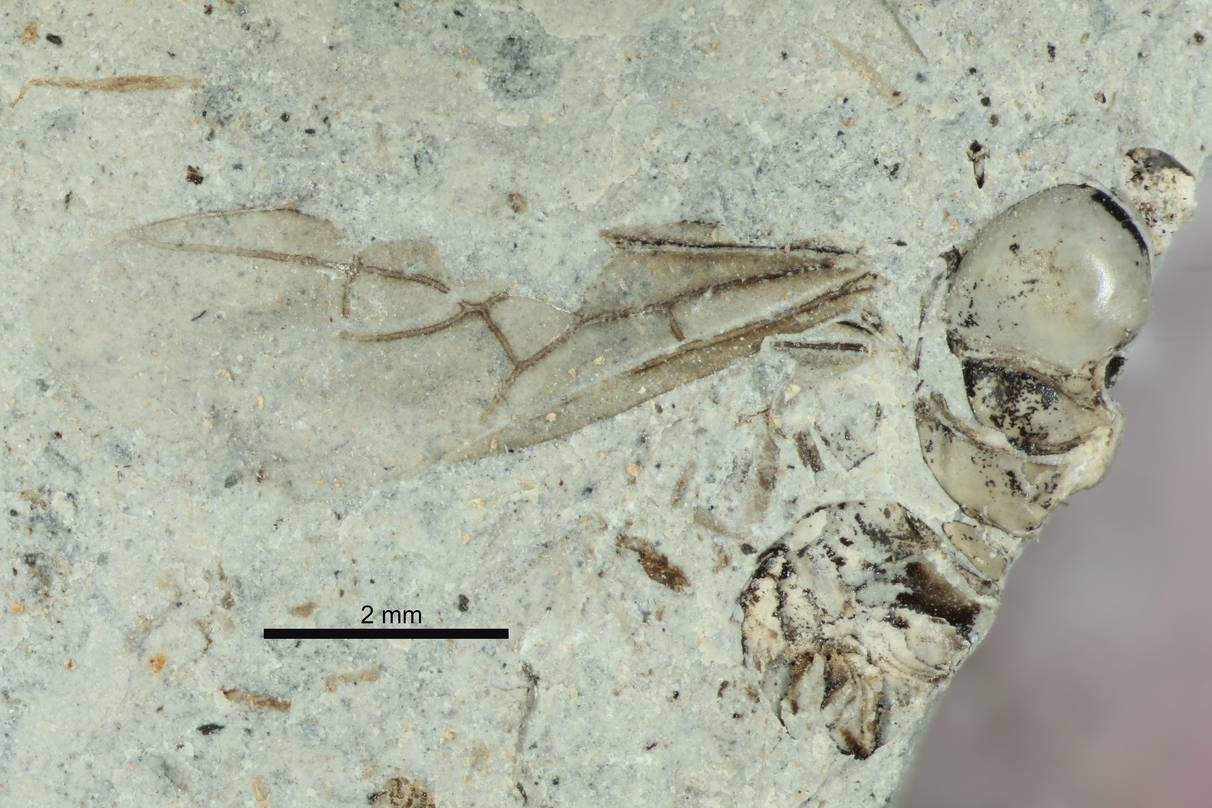
- An E. britannicus queen

Scientific classification
- Domain: Eukaryota
- Kingdom: Animalia
- Phylum: Arthropoda
- Class: Insecta
- Order: Hymenoptera
- Family: Formicidae
- Subfamily: Dolichoderinae
- Tribe: incertae sedis
- Genus: †Emplastus; Donisthorpe, 1920

Type species
- Emplastus britannicus

= Emplastus =

Emplastus Temporal range: Late Eocene – Burdigalian

Genus of ants

Emplastus is an extinct morphogenus of ants in the subfamily Dolichoderinae, known from fossils found in Asia and Europe. The genus contains twelve species described from sites in England, Eastern Europe and Far Eastern Russia.

== Distribution ==
Emplastus is known from a number of adult fossil specimens which are composed of partial adult males, female workers and queens. The first specimens described were preserved as compression fossils in sedimentary rock from the Radoboj area of what is now Croatia. The deposits are the result of sedimentation in an inland sea basin, possibly a shallow lagoon environment, during the Burdigalian of the Early Miocene. Along with the Emplastus species, a diverse assemblage of several hundred species of insects have been preserved in the sediments, along with fish and algae. The fossil impressions are preserved in micrite limestones, resulting in low quality preservation of fine details.

Another series of species were described from compression fossils found in thin layers and concretions of micrite from the "insect bed" and older stratum of the Bembridge Marls. The marls are exposed at a number of locations along the north coast of the Isle of Wight in England. Part of the Bouldnor Formation, the marls have been dated to the Late Eocene in age. The marls have not preserved any Symphyta hymenopterans such as Tenthredinoidea species, suggesting that the paleotemperature of the marls was as warm or possibly warmer than either the Baltic amber or Florissant Formation forests, while the presence of the wasp family Scelionidae suggests generally mesic moisture conditions.

Since the genus and first species descriptions, another series of species have been described from fossils found in Russia. The three species were described from compression fossils preserved in diatomite deposits of the Bol’shaya Svetlovodnaya site. Located in the Pozharsky District, on the Pacific Coast of Russia, the fossil bearing rocks preserve possibly Priabonian plants and animals which lived in a small lake near a volcano. The site has been attributed to either the Maksimovka or Salibez Formations and compared to the Bembridge Marls and Florissant Formation, both of which are Priabonian in age.

== History and classification ==
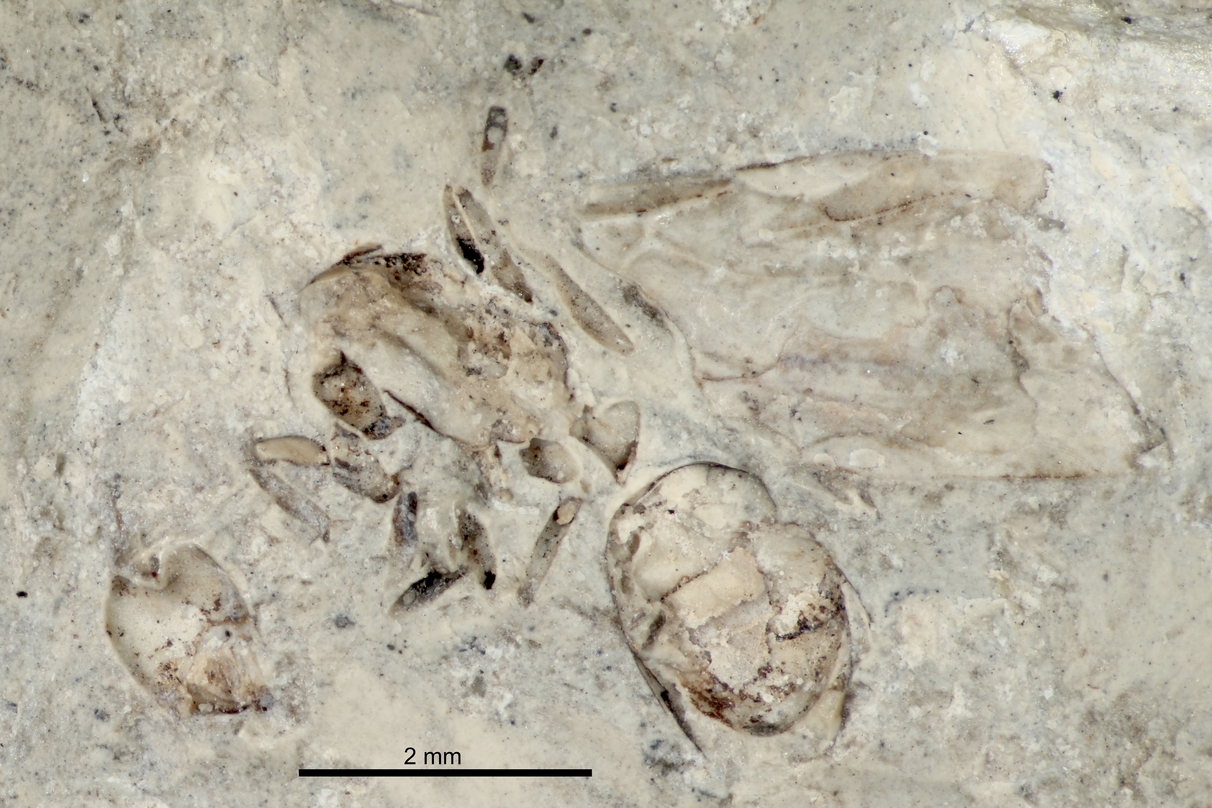
E. gurnetensis holotype

In 1849, some ant fossils from Radoboj were studied by Oswald Heer, then a professor with the University of Zürich. He placed the single species he described in the living genus Formica as Formica ocella and in the same paper, a single male was described as Formica ocella var. paulo major based the large size of the abdomen. The species was retained in Formica by Gustav Mayr in 1867 and Anton Handlirsch in 1907. Mayr named two species Liometopum antiquum and Hypoclinea haueri in an 1867 publication on the ant fossils of Radoboj. The species Hypoclinea haueri was moved in 1893 by Karl Wilhelm von Dalla Torre from Hypoclinea to the combination Iridomyrmex haueri, a placement that was not changed until 2014.

The species and many of the type specimens were reexamined and redescribed in 2014 by paleoentomologists Gennady Dlussky and Tatyana Putyatina.

When Dlussky, Rasnitsyn, and Perfilieva described the species E. biamoensis, they gave it the name E. dubious, but that name had already been used the year prior for a species from Radoboj. As such Perfilieva and Rasnitsyn proposed the replacement name E. biamoensis in a 2015 paper. They derived the name from "Biamo", the older name of the type locality at Bol’shaya Svetlovodnaya.

A number of E. britannicus fossils are known and were described under three different names. The oldest descriptions are that of Theodore Cockerell who named both Dolichoderus britannicus and Dolichoderus ovigerus, citing small wing differences tentatively separating the two species. A third species, Emplastus emeryi, was named by Horace Donisthorpe in 1920, and was the type species of the genus Emplastus. In the time since the initial descriptions of the species, a number of additional queens and several males have been found, and a group of over twenty body fossils plus twenty seven wing fossils were studied by Dlussky and Perfilieva and published in 2014. The fossils showed a spectrum of wing morphology that bridged all three species, and as such they deemed both D. ovigerus and E. emeryi to be synonyms of the first published species name D. britannicus. However the propodeum is different than that of Dolichoderus species, being rounded in profile, and as such the species was retained in the genus Emplastus.

A second Emplastus species was described by Cockerell from the Bembridge Marls as Ponera hypolitha. It was moved in 1964 to the fossil genus Poneropsis, and finally to Emplastus in 2014.

== Description ==
Species in Emplastus are not preserved well enough to place in formal genera, but a suite of characteristics is found in all the species which comprise the morphogenus. All the species have a similar size range, considered medium for ant species. The fossils have generally rectangular heads bearing triangular toothed mandibles and rounded occipital corners. In profile, the propodeum has a round upper surface and the gaster is smooth, with no constriction between the first and second segments. In gynes the petioles are enlarged, while in males, the outline is triangular. In the forewings there are 4 well formed cells enclosed by the veins, 1+2r, 3r, rm and mcu. The 3r cell has an elongated outline that extends to the upper wing margin. Of the wing veins, the 1RS runs perpendicular or slightly angled to the R vein.

=== Emplastusantiquus ===
The neotype fossil is a 5–6 mm (0.20–0.24 in) long gyne preserved as a partial dorsal impression. This species is distinguished by the distinct but weakly concave ocular margin at the rear of the head. All other Emplastus species from Radoboj have slightly convex margins. While E. britannicus also has a concave rear to the head capsule, it is a larger species than E. antiquus and the antenna scape of E. britannicus is much shorter. Due to the poor wing preservation the species was moved from Liometopum, though the preserved areas have a vein structure indicating relation to genera of the subfamily Dolichoderinae.

=== Emplastus biamoensis ===
The single known queen of E. biamoensis is the only Emplastus gyne described from Bol’shaya Svetlovodnaya. Overall the species has a body length of 5.05 mm (0.199 in) The queen is distinct from the other Bol’shaya Svetlovodnaya species due to the forward set smallish eyes, whereas the two other species have large eyes. The species is smaller than the queens from the Bembridge Marls and Radoboj which range between 6–13.5 mm (0.24–0.53 in). The petiole is smaller than that of E. britannicus and E. gurnetensis.

=== Emplastus britannicus ===
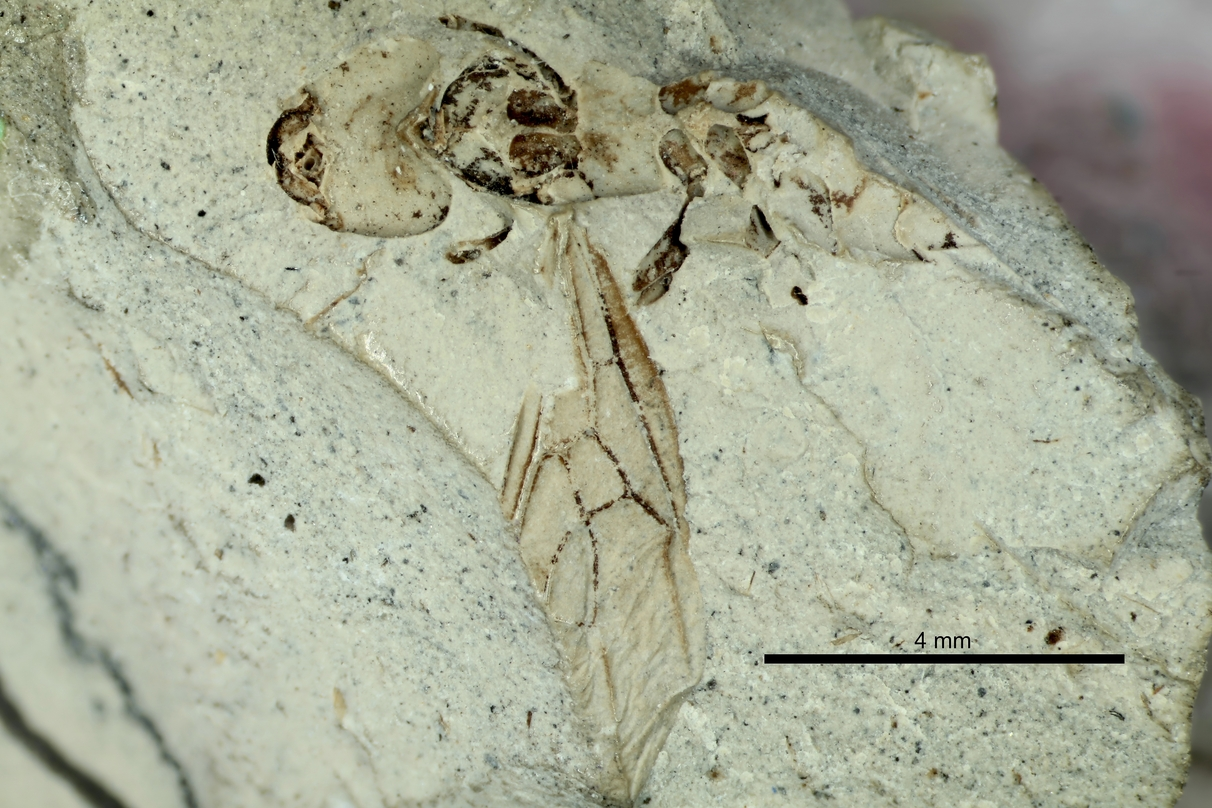
E. britannicus ("E. emeryi" holotype)

Females of E. britannicus range between 6–8.5 mm (0.24–0.33 in) with a forewing length between 6–7 mm (0.24–0.28 in). The head is broader than it is long, giving a rectangular outline, and like E. antiquus of Radoboj it has a convex curve to the rear head margin. While Emery in his description asserted the mandibles to have a smooth margin, further specimens have shown that the robust mandibles have several blunt teeth on the chewing margin. The legs are usually short and thick. The petiole flared in width being up to three times as wide across as it is from front to back. The gaster is typically oval in outline. Males are smaller, at only approximately 6 mm (0.24 in) in length for the few described specimens. They have a small head, with similar mandibles to the females, and likewise similar short antenna scapes. Unlike the females, the legs of the males are long and fairly thin.

The species names britannicus and ovigerus were not given etymologies by Cockerell, while the name emeryi was coined by Donisthorpe as a patronym honoring the Italian entomologist Carlo Emery, who gave input Donisthorpe on the Isle of Wight fossils, and for his work on Sicilian amber ants. Overall individuals of E. britannicus are the most numerous ant fossils in the Bembridge Marls.

=== Emplastus dubius ===
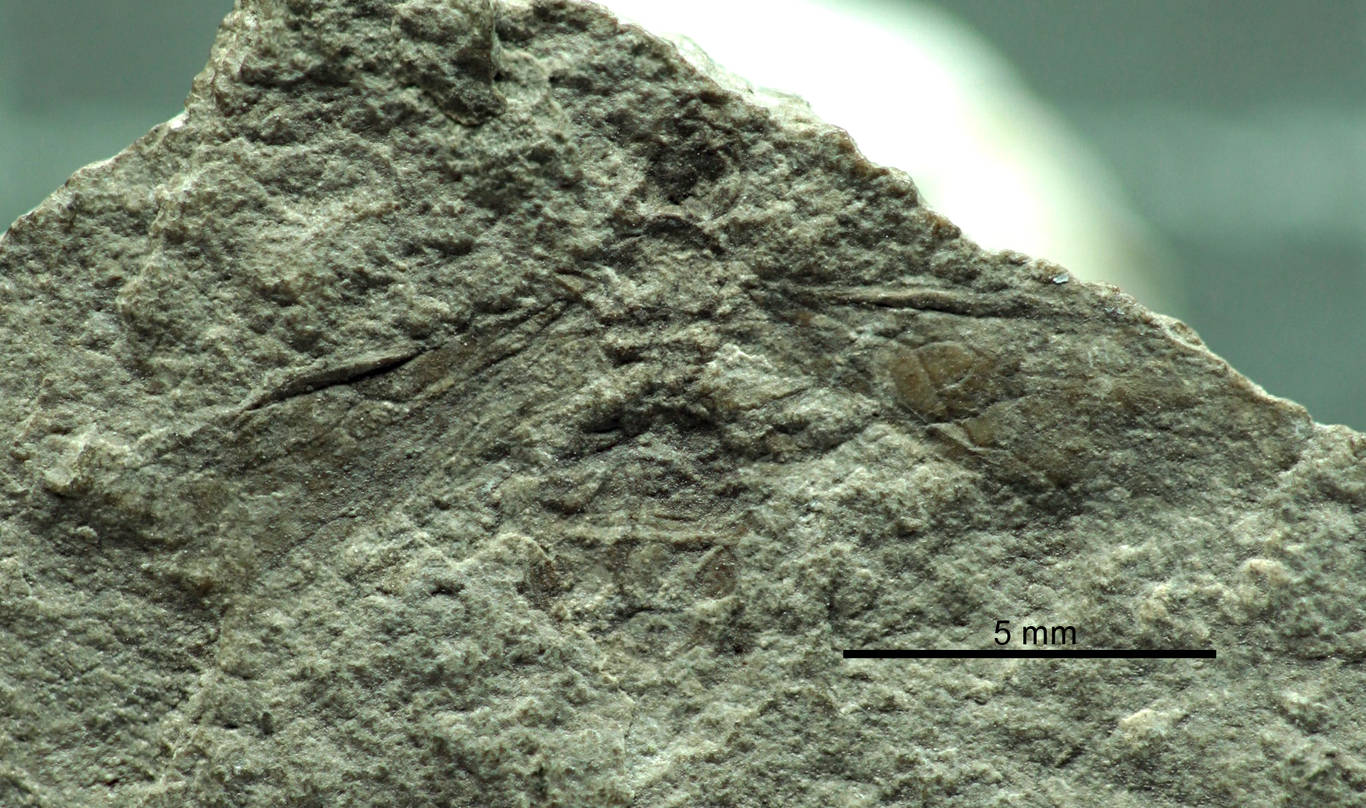
The E. dubius holoype

The 7.5 mm (0.30 in) E. dubius queen is separated from the other species due to the distinct structure of the forewing cells. The wings have a triangular RM cell, while other species have a rectangular RM cell. Also the RM cell has a peduncle, while the RM cell of other species do not. The head is just slightly rectangular, being a little longer than wide. Similarly, the mesosoma is nearly one-and-a-half times longer than its height. The gaster, however, is an oval shape in outline. Dlussky and Putyatina coined the species name from the Latin "dubius", meaning uncertain. The queen was originally identified by Heer as a specimen of Formica globularus.

=== Emplastus elongatus ===
The solitary male specimen of E. elongatus is 6.3 mm (0.25 in), preserved in profile, and with the head twisted so the upper area of the head capsule is showing. The front edge of the clypeus is slightly rounded, unlike that of E. macrops. The angle of the head shows large developed ocelli, but the antennae are not preserved. The compound eyes are large as in E. macrops. The two species are separated by the longer mesosoma of E. elongatus, which also has a more rounded scutum.

=== Emplastus gurnetensis ===
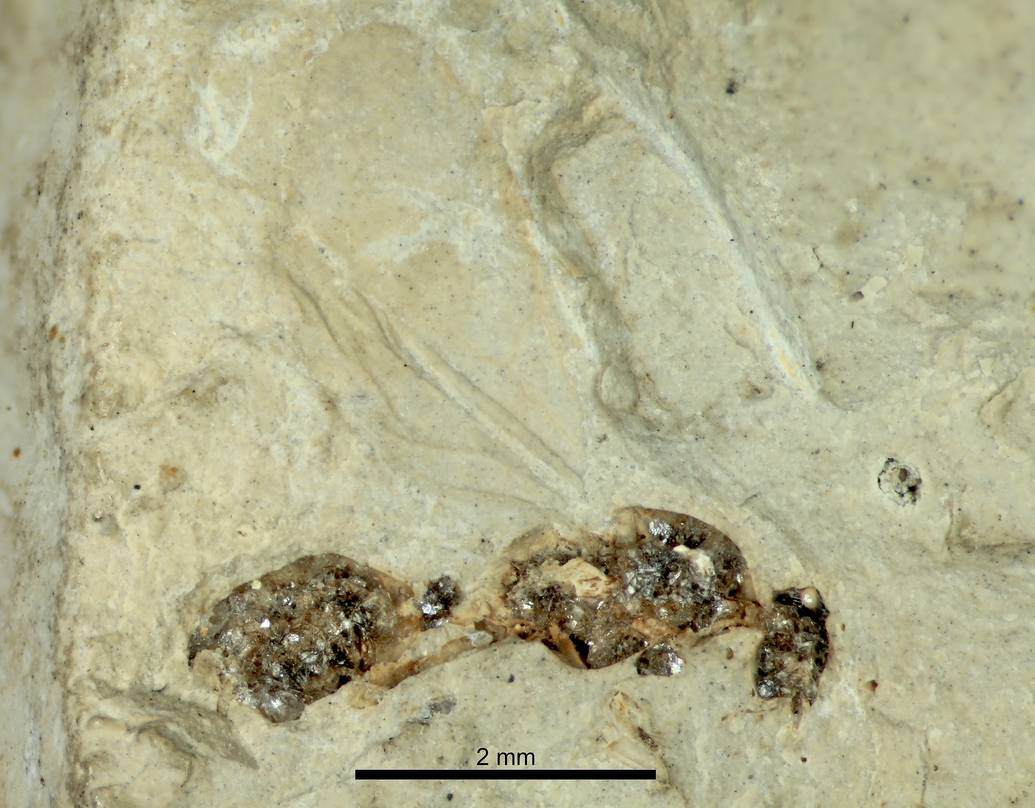
E. gurnetensis queen

The head of the E. gurnetensis is longer than wide, with slightly convex sides and an occipital margin that may be straight or poorly convex. The propodeum is smoothly rounded in profile, and the legs are short and thick. The males are smaller than the queens, with an average body length of 4 mm (0.16 in). The heads have large, visible ocelli, while the petiole is slightly higher than long with a triangular outline. Both the scutum and scutellum have convex upper surfaces, and the legs are long and thin. While E. gurnetensis is very similar to both E. britannicus and E. hypolithus in several respects, there are notable differences. The female size is smaller, at 5.5 mm (0.22 in), than the male E. hypolithus, indicating they are separate species. In the case of E. britannicus, there are features of both the head and petiole structures that indicate they are distinct.

=== Emplastus haueri ===
The single queen of this species was described by Mayr in 1867. The description provided in the type paper indicated a body length of about 5.8 mm (0.23 in) and with forewings nearly as long at 5.4 mm (0.21 in). The slightly rounded mesosoma is distinct from all the other species being notably long. Since the holotype specimen could not be located for restudy and the one possible male of the species is not well preserved, the species was transferred from Iridomyrmex to Emplastus by Dlussky and Putyatina.

=== Emplastus hypolithus ===
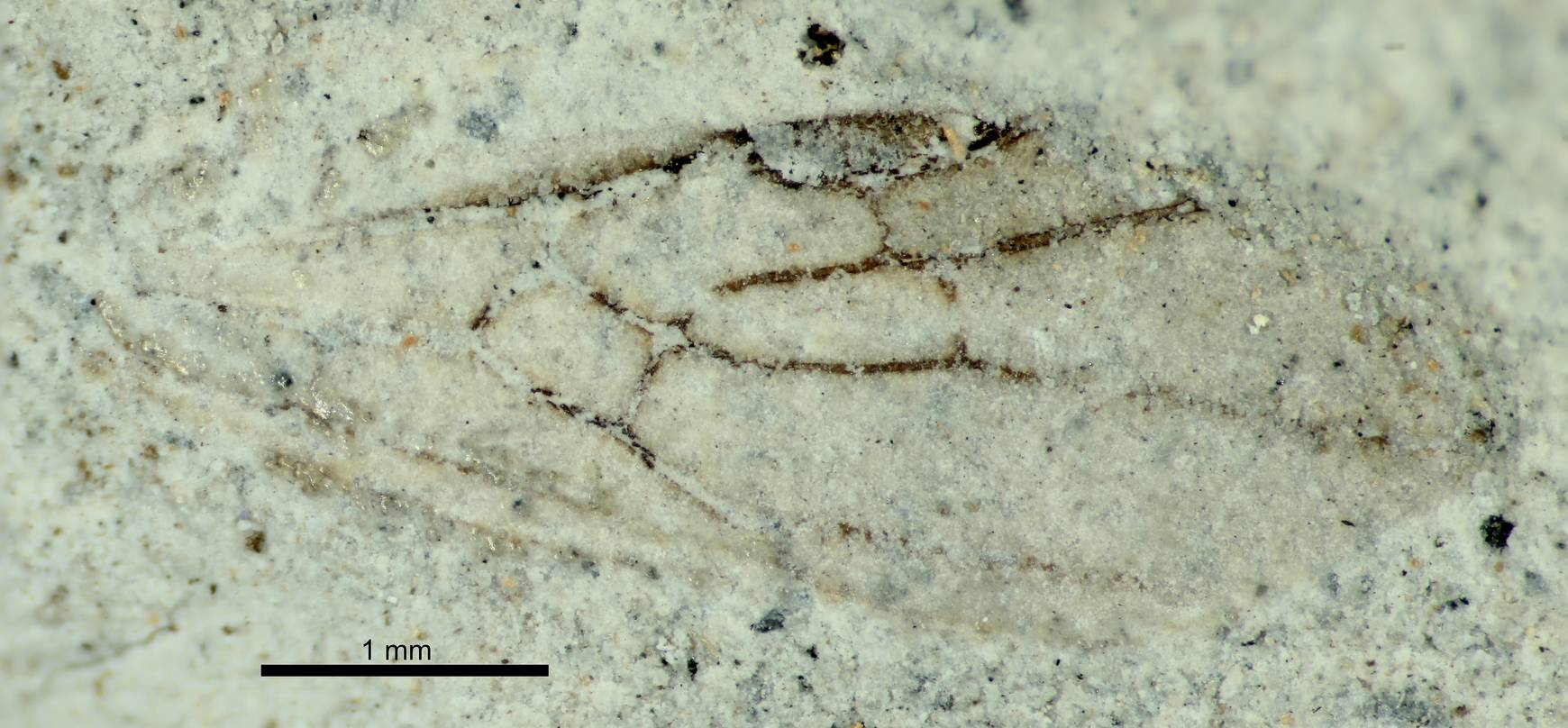
E. hypolithus wing

The species was redescribed from fourteen isolated wings and a single 6.5 mm (0.26 in) long male in 2014. The species is distinguishable by the notably narrow rm cell of the forewing, which mostly takes a triangular shape, but sometimes is quadrangular. The mid-sized cmu cell is trapezoidal and the rs-m cross-vein is usually placed on the wing tip side of the 2r-rs vein. The male has a small head with compound eyes located anterior to the head's midpoint. The scutellum is weakly rounded and about half the length of the mesosoma.

=== Emplastus kozlovi ===
This Bembridge Marls species was described from a set of five solitary wings from males and females. The female forewings have lengths ranging between 11–12 mm (0.43–0.47 in) while the smaller male wings are generally 7.8–8.8 mm (0.31–0.35 in). The vein structure is similar to that of E. britannicus though the wing size of the latter is smaller. E. kozlovi also differs in the proportioning of the triangular rm cell, which is longer than in E. britannicus. One of the paratype wings had initially been identified by Donisthorpe as a wing of E. britannicus, and was not re-identified until the description of E. kozlovi in 2014. Dlussky and Perfilieva named the species after the finder of the holotype fossil, Mikhail Kozlov.

=== Emplastus macrops ===
E. macrops was described from a single 5 mm (0.20 in) male preserved in profile. The fossil lacks portions of the antennae, wings, legs, and gaster, resulting in placement of the species into Emplastus. The male has a short antenna scape that does not extend past the head capsule margin. The clypeus has a straight front edge bordering the triangular mandibles. E. macrops is distinguished from the other species in the genus based on the notably large compound eyes that are oval in outline and cover most of the side of the head. The species name is Latin, meaning, "with large eyes".

=== Emplastus miocenicus ===
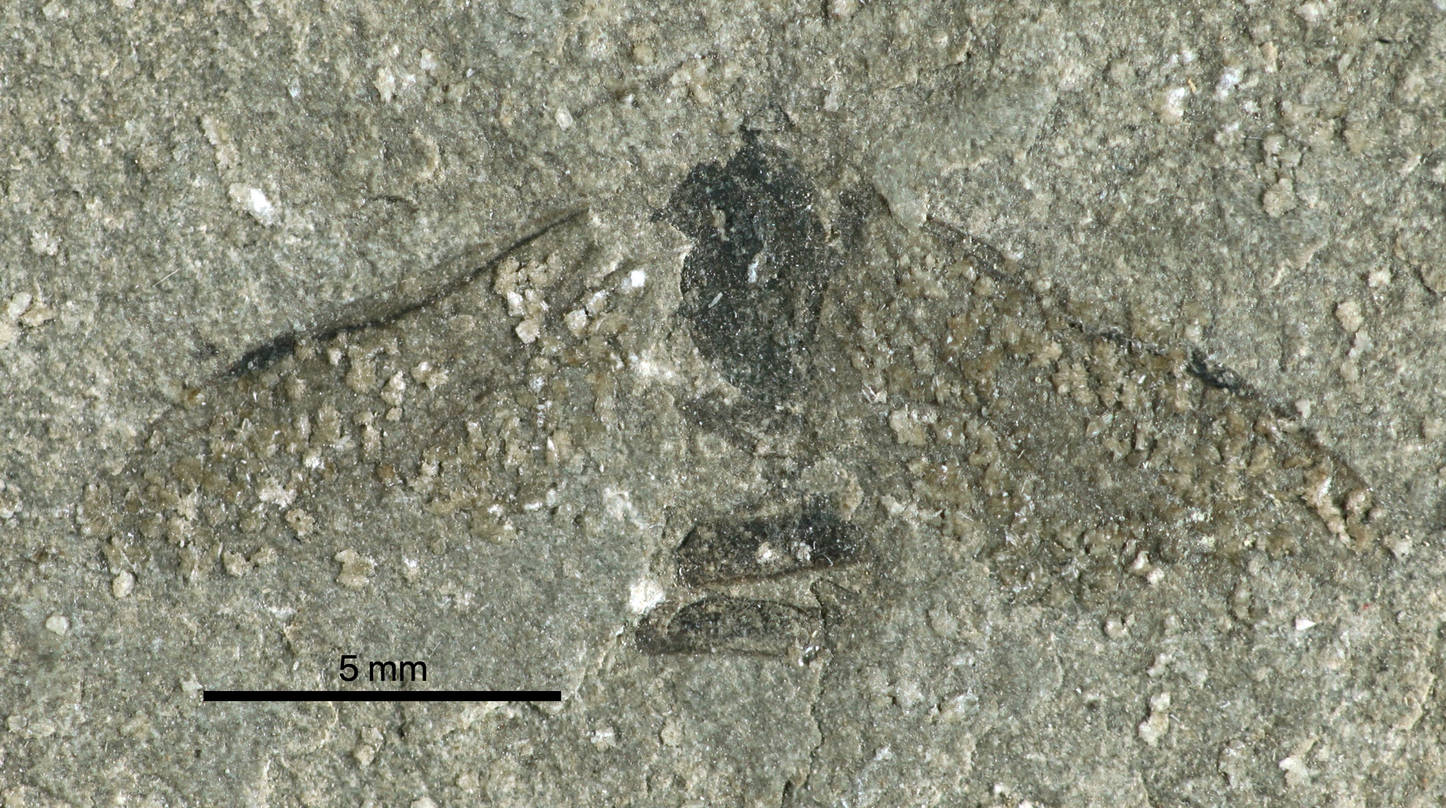
E. miocenicus paratype queen

Dlussky and Putyatina described this species from a pair of fossils that had been identified as other species. The holotype queen was originally identified by Heer as Ponera fuliginosa, while the paratype queen was identified by Heer as Formica ungeri. While the queens are similar in appearance to E. haueri, both are double in body length of that species, being 13.5 mm (0.53 in) long. The queens have heads that are nearly square, compound eyes placed near the midpoint, and a clypeus that is curved on the front margin.

=== Emplastus (?) ocellus ===
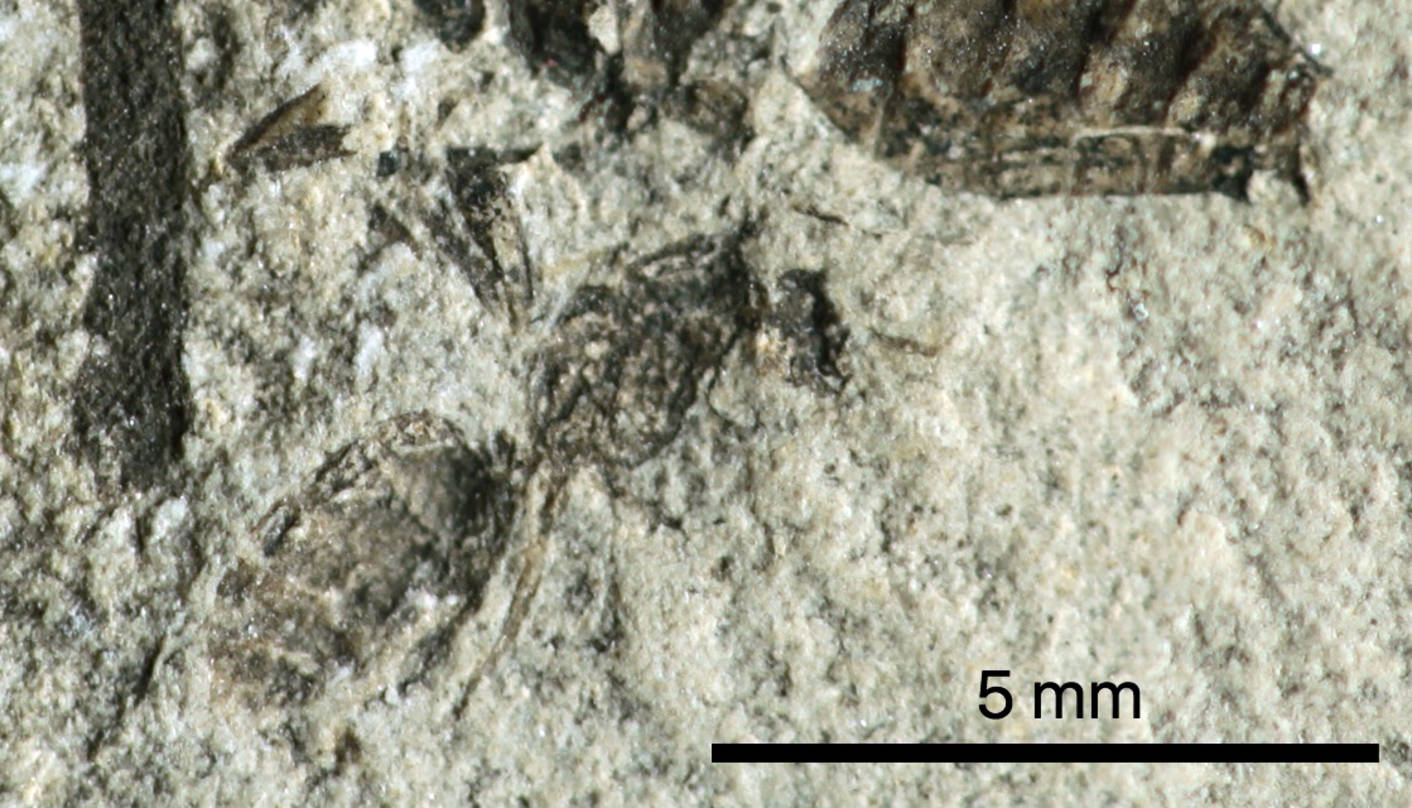
E.(?) ocellus male

The species was first described by Heer as Formica ocella from a pair of queens and males that he thought to be mating when entombed in the lake bottom, in addition to an additional solitary male. The type queen has a body length of 6.2 mm (0.24 in), while the males range between 4.9–5.6 mm (0.19–0.22 in). The head capsule is rectangular in outline with straight sides and a concave outline to the rear margin. The front edge of the clypeus is straight, bordering the mandibles which have a curving shape. The unique features of the head are distinct to the species, but preservation is poor enough that placement into a new genus or existing genus is problematic.
