= Tasiilap Karra =

Headland in Sermersooq, Greenland

Tasiilap Karra Cape Gustav Holm
- Cape
- Coordinates: 66°34′N 34°22′W
- Location: Sermersooq, Greenland
- Offshore water bodies: North Atlantic Ocean

Area
  - Total: Arctic

Tasiilap Karra or Cape Gustav Holm (Danish: Kap Gustav Holm) is a headland in eastern Greenland, Sermersooq municipality.

It was named after officer of the Danish Navy and Arctic explorer Gustav Holm (1849 – 1940).

== Geography ==
Cape Gustav Holm is located near the Arctic Circle on the shores of the Denmark Strait coast of the North Atlantic Ocean, northeast of Tasiilaq.

This cape is the southern end of a narrow mountainous peninsula east of the Ikersuak Fjord which extends in a NE/SW direction, rising to a height of 966 m. The islet of Nanertalik lies 1.2 km off a small projection on the shore 5 km northeast of the cape and Cape Buchholz is located a further 7 km to the northeast along the coast. The Northern K.J.V. Steenstrup Glacier has its terminus west of the cape.

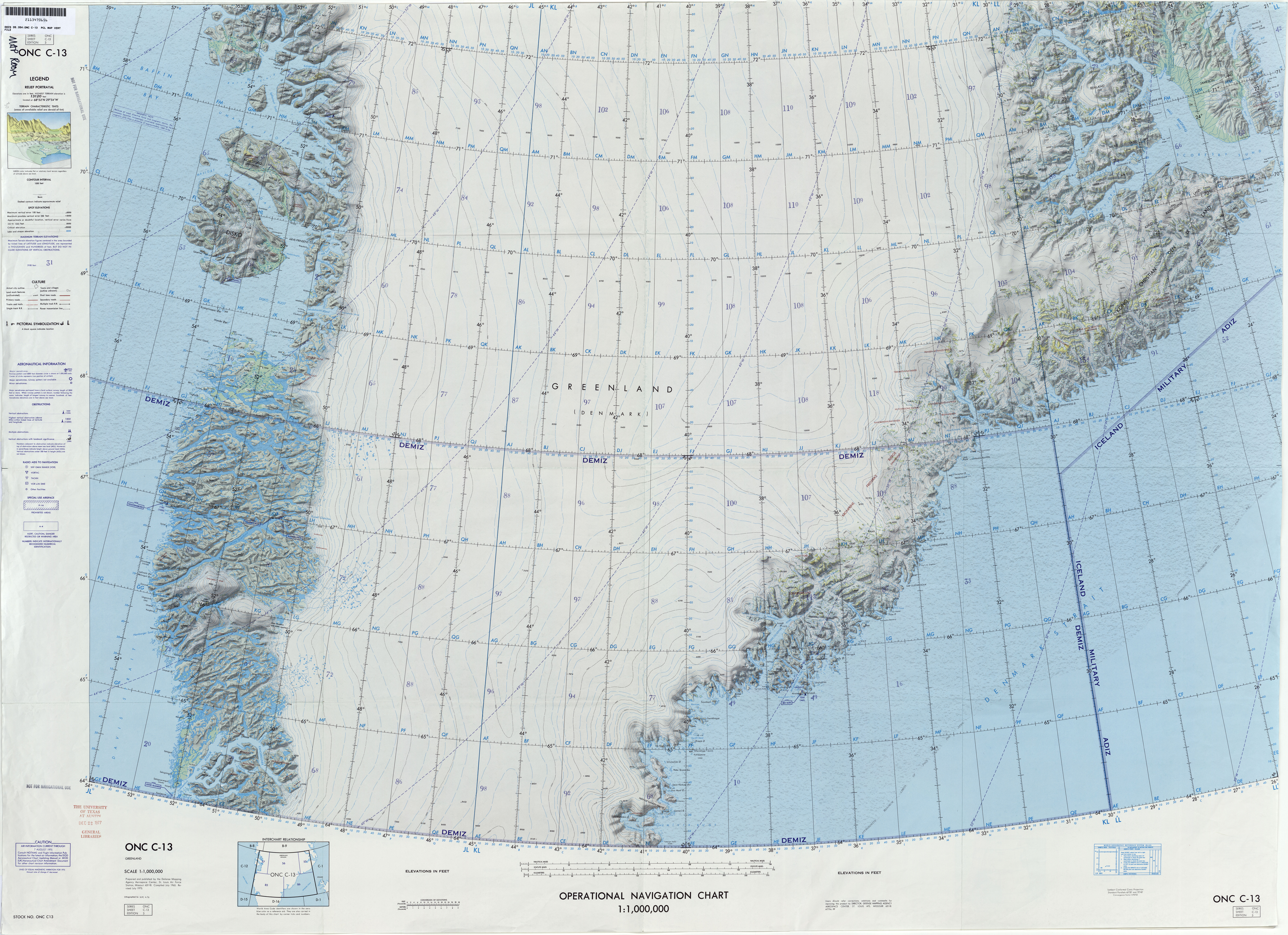
Map of Greenland section.

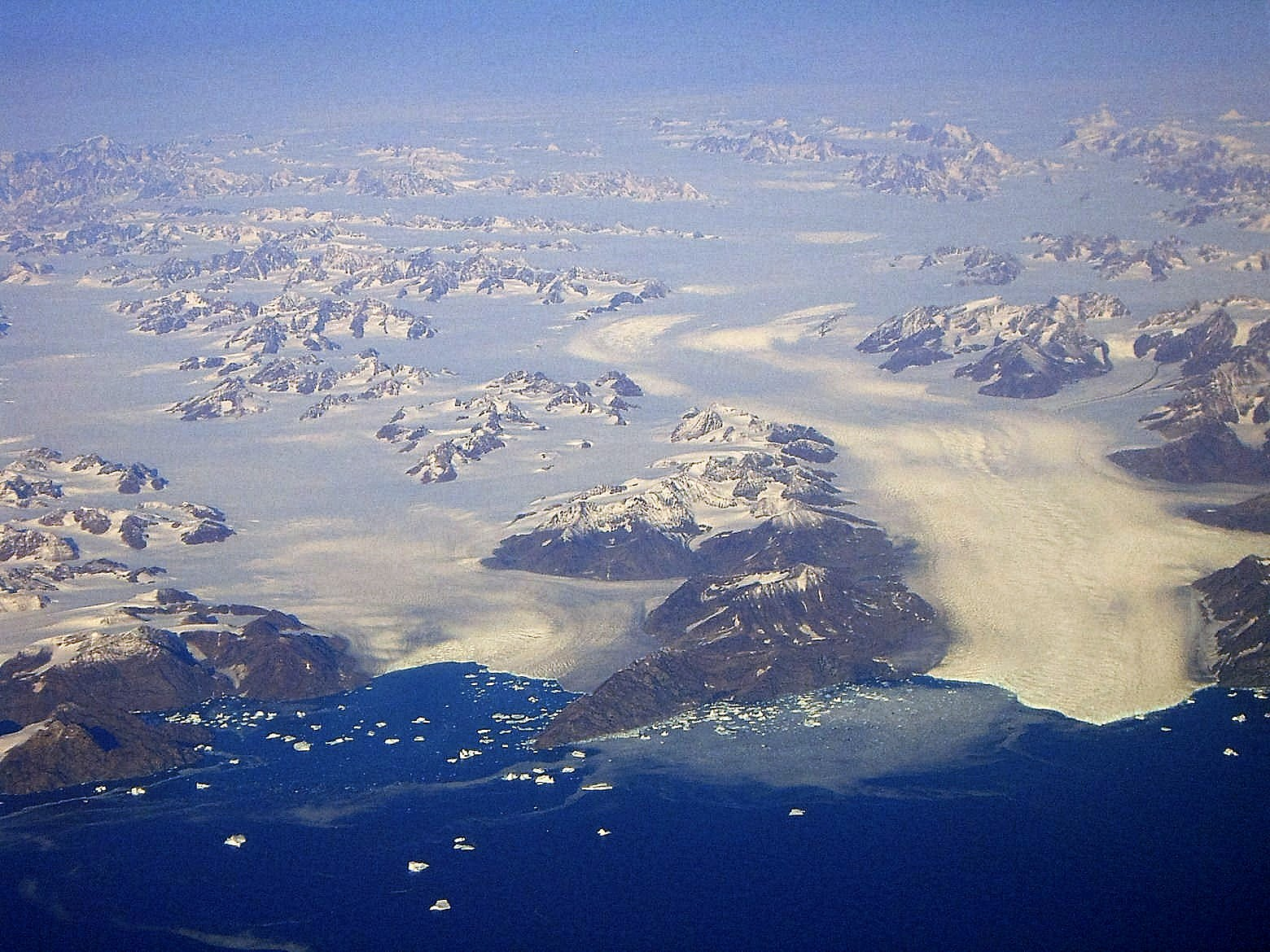
View of the coastline 8 km to the west of Cape Gustav Holm with the Northern K.J.V. Steenstrup Glacier on the right by the mouth of the Ikertivaq Fjord.
