= Thomas Vilhelm Garde =

Thomas Garde
- Born: 22 October 1859; Copenhagen, Denmark
- Died: 24 June 1926 (aged 66) Copenhagen, Denmark
- Allegiance: Denmark
- Branch: Royal Danish Navy
- Service years: 1877–1921
- Rank: Commander
- Awards: Service Medal; Order of the Dannebrog

Thomas Vilhelm Garde (22 October 1859 – 24 June 1926) was a Danish naval officer, distinguished for his explorations in Greenland.

Garde became a sub-lieutenant of the Danish Navy in 1880, rising to the rank of First lieutenant in 1881, captain in 1898, Commander in 1908 and Rear Admiral in 1918. He retired from active service in 1921.

== Explorations ==
Garde was junior leader of the Umiak Expedition of 1883-85 led by Gustav Holm. They thoroughly explored the coast of southeast Greenland, by journeys from Cape Farewell using umiak boats. Garde explored Lindenow Fjord (62° 15' N), where have been found the Scandinavian ruins on the east coast. Wintering at Nanortalik, he discovered between there and Cape Farewell 200 live glaciers, of which 70 had a sea face more than a mile (1.61 km) wide. During his 1893 surveys of the Julianehaab district in the southwest of Greenland, he made a long journey over the Greenland ice cap, which proved to be of unsuspected height. In his trip of 13 days he traveled 180 miles (290 km) across the ice and reached an elevation of more than 8000 feet (2438 m). He was awarded the Roquette medal by the Société de Géographie of Paris.

In 1897, he led the Russian icebreaker Nadeshny from Copenhagen to Vladivostok. He became a commander in the Royal Danish navy, chief of staff, from 1908 to 1911 Assistant to the Minister of the Navy and in 1918 Rear Admiral. Garde's narratives of his explorations appeared in Meddelelser om Grønland, ix, xvi (50 volumes, Copenhagen, 1876–1912). His observations formed the foundation for the first complete description of West Greenland waterways, including information about wind and ice.

== Works ==
- Meddelelser om Grønland (50 vol. 1876–1912)
- Beretning Om Konebaads-Expeditionen Til Grønlands Østkyst (with Gustav Holm) (1889)
- Beskrivelse Af Expeditionen Til Sydvestgrønland (1893)
- Un été au Groenland (in French) (1895)
- Vindkort over den nordligste Del af Atlanterhavet og Davis-Stræde konstruerede paa Grundlag af Observationer tilhørende det Danske Meteorologiske Institut (1900)
- Windcharts of the Northernmost Part of the Atlantic and of Davis-Strait constructed on the Basis of Observations belonging to the Danish Meteorological Institute (1900)

== Honours ==
The Garde Nunataks (Garde Nunatakker) in Greenland were named after him by the 1909–12 Alabama Expedition.

- Order of the Dannebrog; Commander 1st Class (1919)
- Danish Service medal in gold (1921)

== See also ==
- Gustav Frederik Holm
- Cartographic expeditions to Greenland
- List of Arctic expeditions
