= Orosaurus =

Orosaurus Temporal range: Late Triassic, 221.5–201.6 Ma

Scientific classification
- Kingdom: Animalia
- Phylum: Chordata
- Class: Reptilia
- Clade: Dinosauria
- Clade: Saurischia
- Clade: †Sauropodomorpha
- Genus: †Orosaurus; Huxley, 1867
- Species: †O. capensis

Binomial name
- †Orosaurus capensis Huxley, 1867

Synonyms
- Euskelosaurus capensis von Huene, 1940; Orinosaurus capensis Lydekker, 1889

Extinct genus of reptiles from late Triassic South Africa

Orosaurus ("mountain lizard") is a dubious genus of basal sauropodomorph dinosaur from the Late Triassic of South Africa, containing a single species, O. capensis.

== Classification ==
The holotype was discovered in 1863. It was first described by Thomas Henry Huxley in 1867 based on holotype NHMUK R1626, a proximal end of a left tibia (misidentified as a distal femur). However, Huxley declined to provide a species name. In his 1889 catalogue of fossil reptiles in the Natural History Museum in London, Richard Lydekker mistakenly considered Orosaurus preoccupied by the lizard genus Oreosaurus and coined Orinosaurus capensis for NHMUK R1626. Along with Euskelosaurus, Lydekker considered Orosaurus (Orinosaurus of his usage) to be an ornithischian dinosaur.

von Huene (1940) treated Orosaurus as a species of Euskelosaurus, as E. capensis. van Heerden (1979) considered Orosaurus a synonym of Euskelosaurus. However, Gauffre (1996) referred Orosaurus to his nomen ex dissertationae "Kholumolumosaurus" (now Kholumolumo) along with Meroktenos and Plateosauravus. Meanwhile, Orosaurus was listed as a nomen dubium in the 2nd edition of The Dinosauria.
