= Ikersuaq, East Greenland =

Fjord along the King Christian IX Land coast, Greenland

Ikersuaq
- Ikertivaq
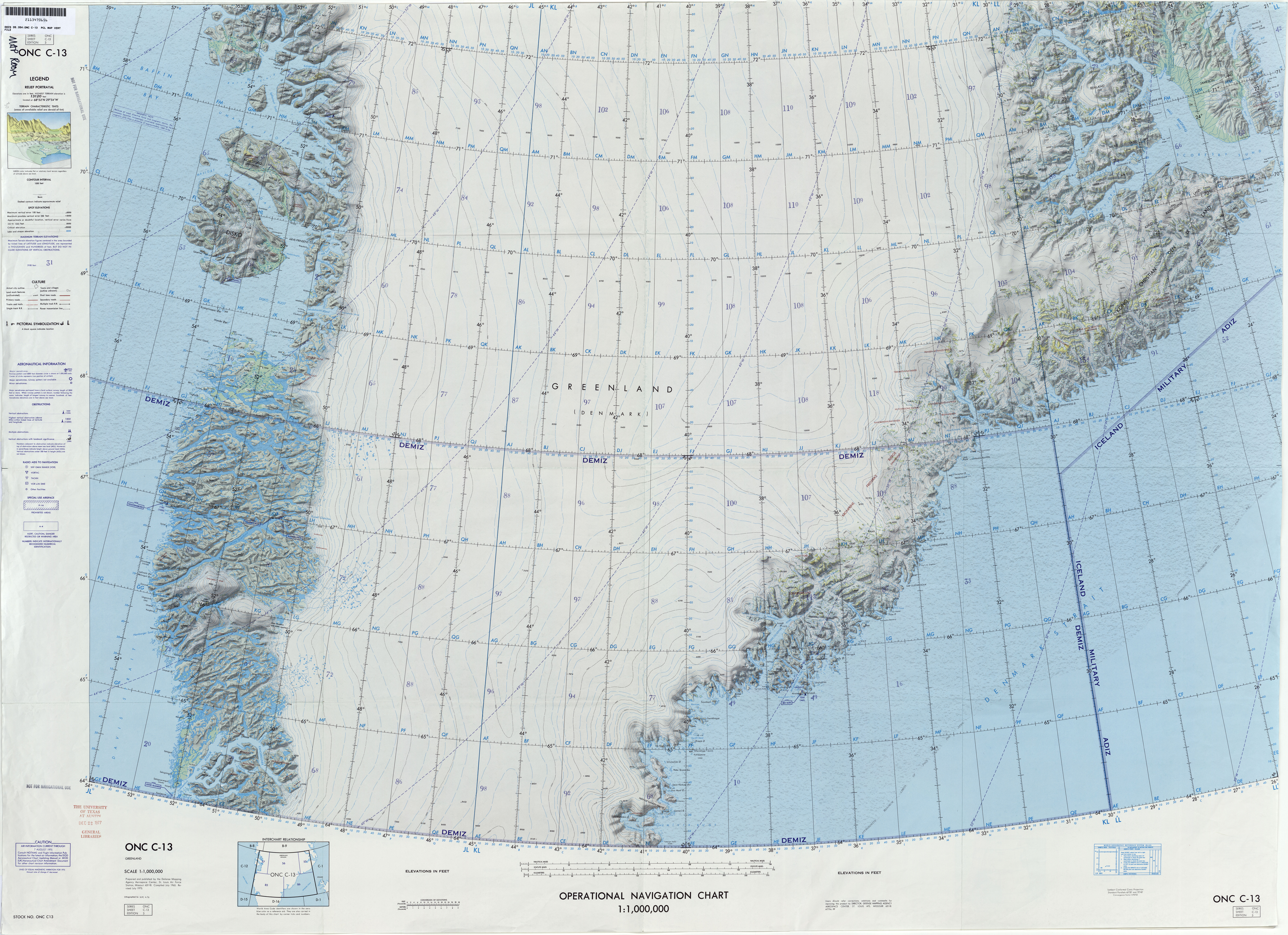
- Map of Greenland section

- Location in Greenland
- Location: SE Greenland
- Coordinates: 66°38′N 34°28′W
- Ocean/sea sources: North Atlantic Ocean
- Basin countries: Greenland
- Max. length: 25 km (16 mi)
- Max. width: 3 km (1.9 mi)

Ikersuaq (old spelling Ikerssuak), meaning "the great sound" in the Greenlandic language, —also known as Ikertivaq— is a fjord in Sermersooq municipality, southeastern Greenland.

This fjord is mostly encumbered by ice.

Tundra climate prevails in the region of the fjord, the average annual temperature in the area being -10 °C. The warmest month is July when the average temperature rises to 0 °C and the coldest is January with -18 °C.

== Geography ==
Ikersuaq is a fjord of the King Christian IX Land coast. It extends in a roughly north–south direction for about 25 km. To the south the fjord opens into the North Atlantic Ocean near Tasiilap Karra (Cape Gustav Holm). The fjord has two main branches: Eastern Tasiisaq (Ostre Tasiisaq), extending 13 km north on the western side of Cape Gustav Holm, and Western Tasiisaq (Vester Tasiisaq) extending 5 km to the SW 10 km from the mouth on the western shore of the fjord. The Northern K.J.V. Steenstrup Glacier has its terminus just south of the promontory at the mouth of the fjord.

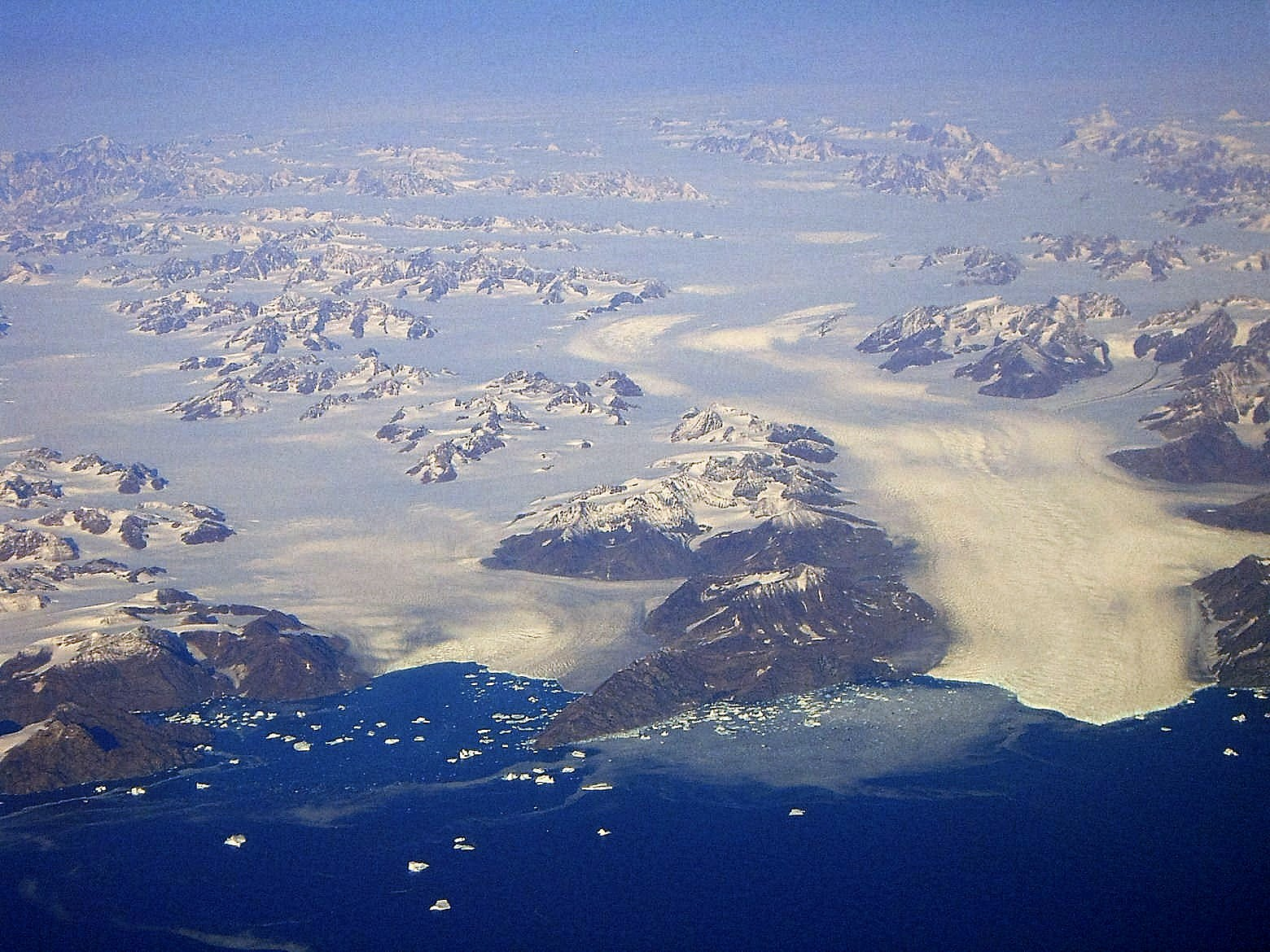
View of the shore just south of the Ikertivaq Fjord with the Southern K.J.V. Steenstrup Glacier on the left and the Northern on the right.

== See also ==
- List of fjords of Greenland
