= Steenstrup Glacier =

Glacier in Greenland

- Sermerssuak; Steenstrup Gletscher
- Location within Greenland
- Type: Tidewater glacier
- Location: NW Greenland
- Coordinates: 75°19′N 57°59′W
- Width: 14 km (8.7 mi)
- Terminus: Melville Bay

Steenstrup Glacier (Danish: Steenstrup Gletscher), is a glacier in NW Greenland. Administratively it belongs to the Avannaata municipality.

This glacier was named after Danish geologist and explorer of Greenland K. J. V. Steenstrup (1842 - 1913).

== Geography ==
The Steenstrup Glacier is the largest and widest glacier in the Lauge Koch Coast, Melville Bay. It originates in the western side of the Greenland ice sheet and flows westwards between the Dietrichson Gletscher to the north and the Kjer Glacier to the south. Its terminus is just northeast of the Depot Islands and north of Red Head in the Melville Bay. The Kløftet Nunatak is located south, and the Kleinschmidt Nunatak rises on the northern side.

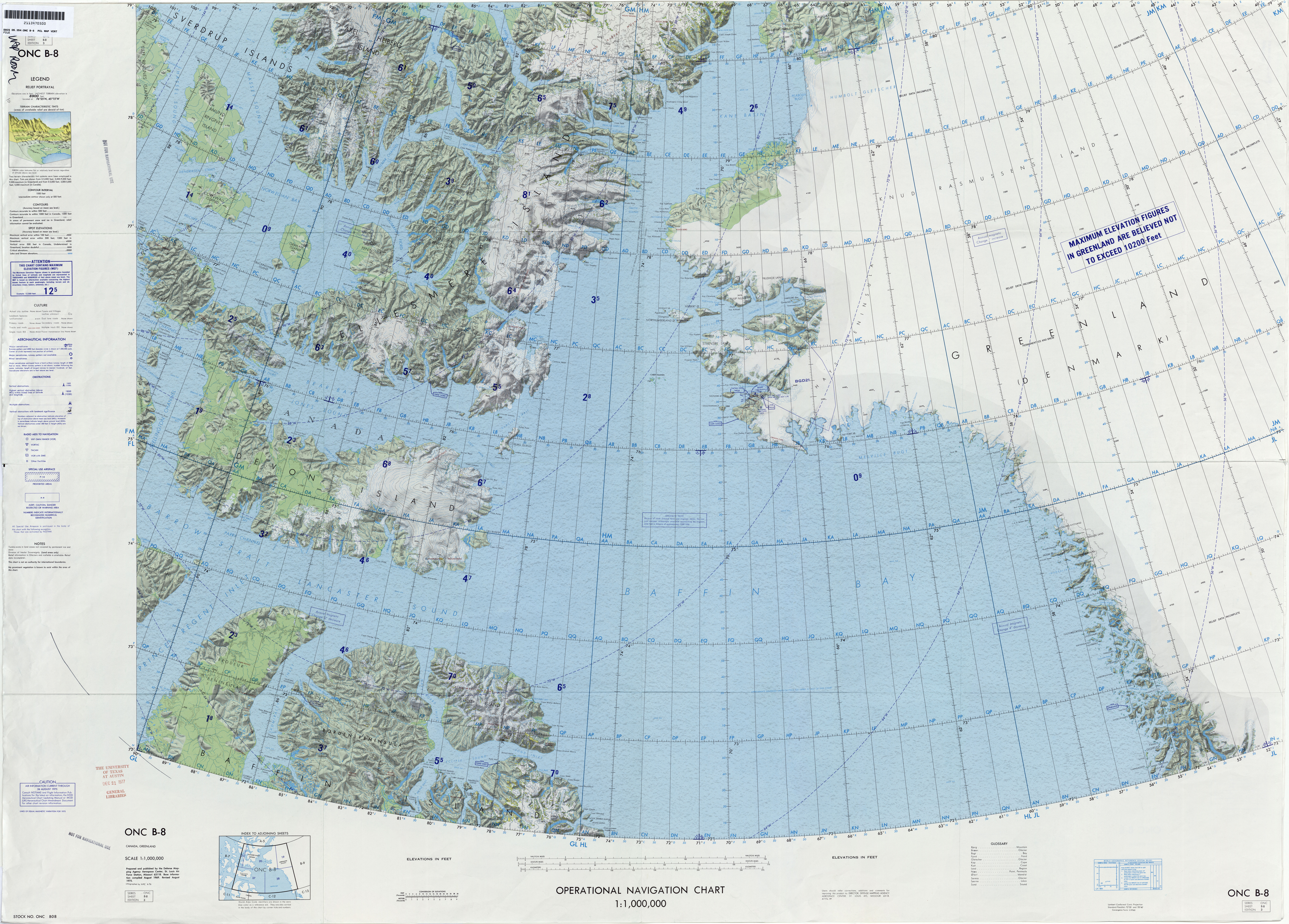
Map of Northwestern Greenland

== See also ==
- List of glaciers in Greenland
