= Jazvine, Croatia =

Jazvine
- Location within Croatia
- Coordinates: 46°08′46″N 15°54′14″E
- Country: Croatia
- County: Krapina-Zagorje
- Municipality: Radoboj

Area
  - Total: 1.2 km^{2} (0.46 sq mi)

Population (2021)
  - Total: 357
  - Density: 300/km^{2} (770/sq mi)
- Time zone: UTC+1 (CET)
  - Summer (DST): UTC+2 (CEST)

Jazvine is a village in Croatia, part of Municipality of Radoboj.
