= K.J.V. Steenstrup Glacier =

Glacier in Greenland

- K.I.V. Steenstrups Nordre Bræ / K.I.V. Steenstrups Søndre Bræ
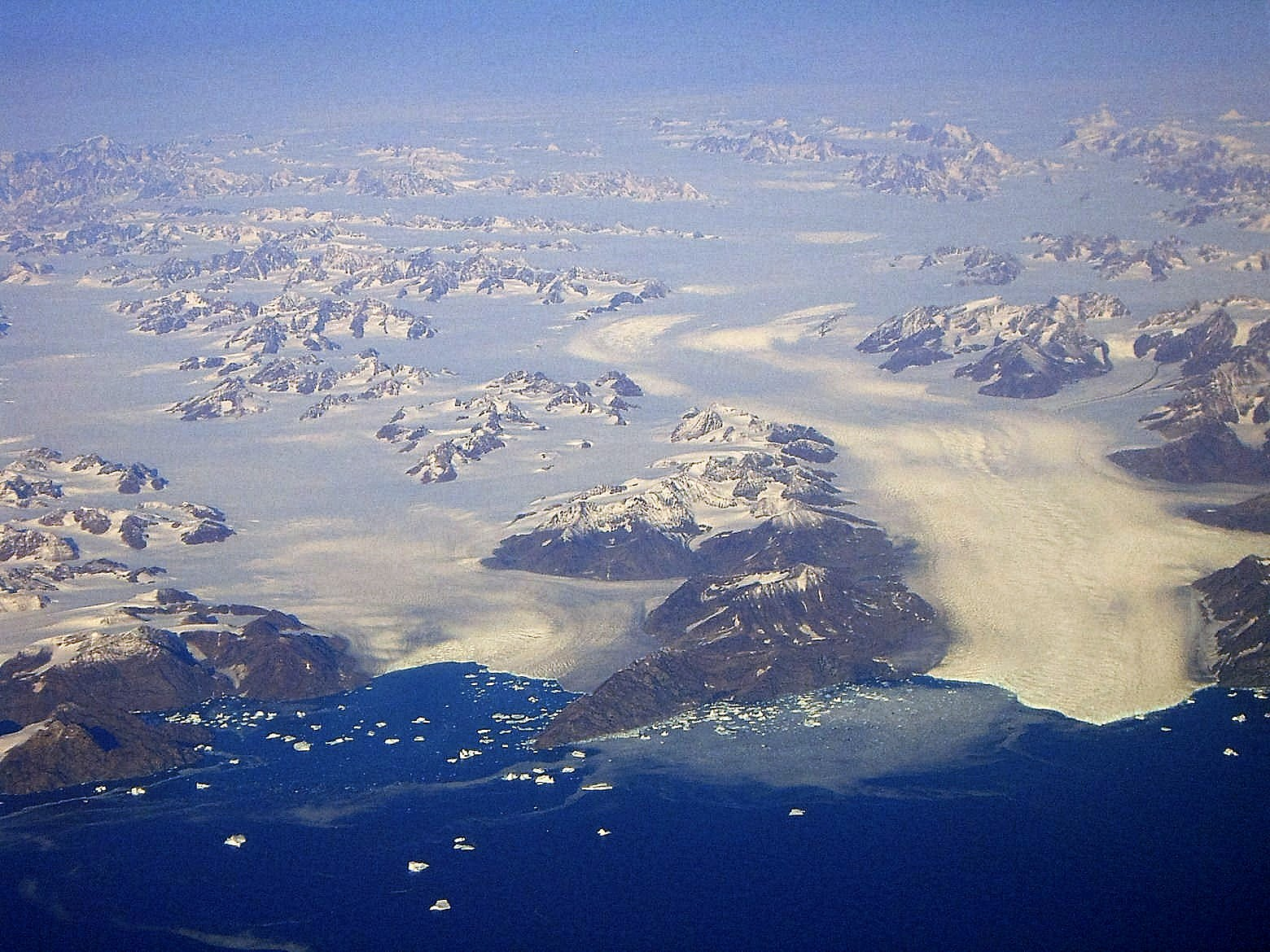
- 2014 view of the terminus of the two K.J.V. Steenstrup glaciers with the Northern on the right and the Southern on the left.

- Location within Greenland
- Type: Piedmont glacier
- Location: Greenland
- Coordinates: 66°37′N 35°0′W
- Length: 50
- Width: 5 km (3.1 mi)
- Terminus: North Atlantic Ocean near Tasiilap Karra (Cape Gustav Holm)

K.J.V. Steenstrup Glacier is one of the major glaciers in King Christian IX Land, by the eastern coast of Greenland, Sermersooq municipality. This ice formation includes two nearly parallel glaciers, the Northern K.J.V. Steenstrup Glacier (Danish: K.I.V. Steenstrups Nordre Bræ) and the Southern K.J.V. Steenstrup Glacier (Danish: K.I.V. Steenstrups Søndre Bræ). These glaciers were named after Danish geologist and explorer of Greenland K. J. V. Steenstrup (1842 - 1913).

== Geography ==
The K.J.V. Steenstrup Glaciers originate in a mountainous glaciated area east of Schweizerland. They flow from the NW in a roughly southeastern direction.

The two glaciers have their terminus on the east coast of the Greenland ice sheet, in the Denmark Strait roughly 8 km west of Tasiilap Karra (Cape Gustav Holm). The northern side of the terminus of the Northern K.J.V. Steenstrup Glacier is by the mouth of the Ikersuaq (Ikertivaq) fjord. Their faces form impressive walls of ice between 60 and 90 m high.

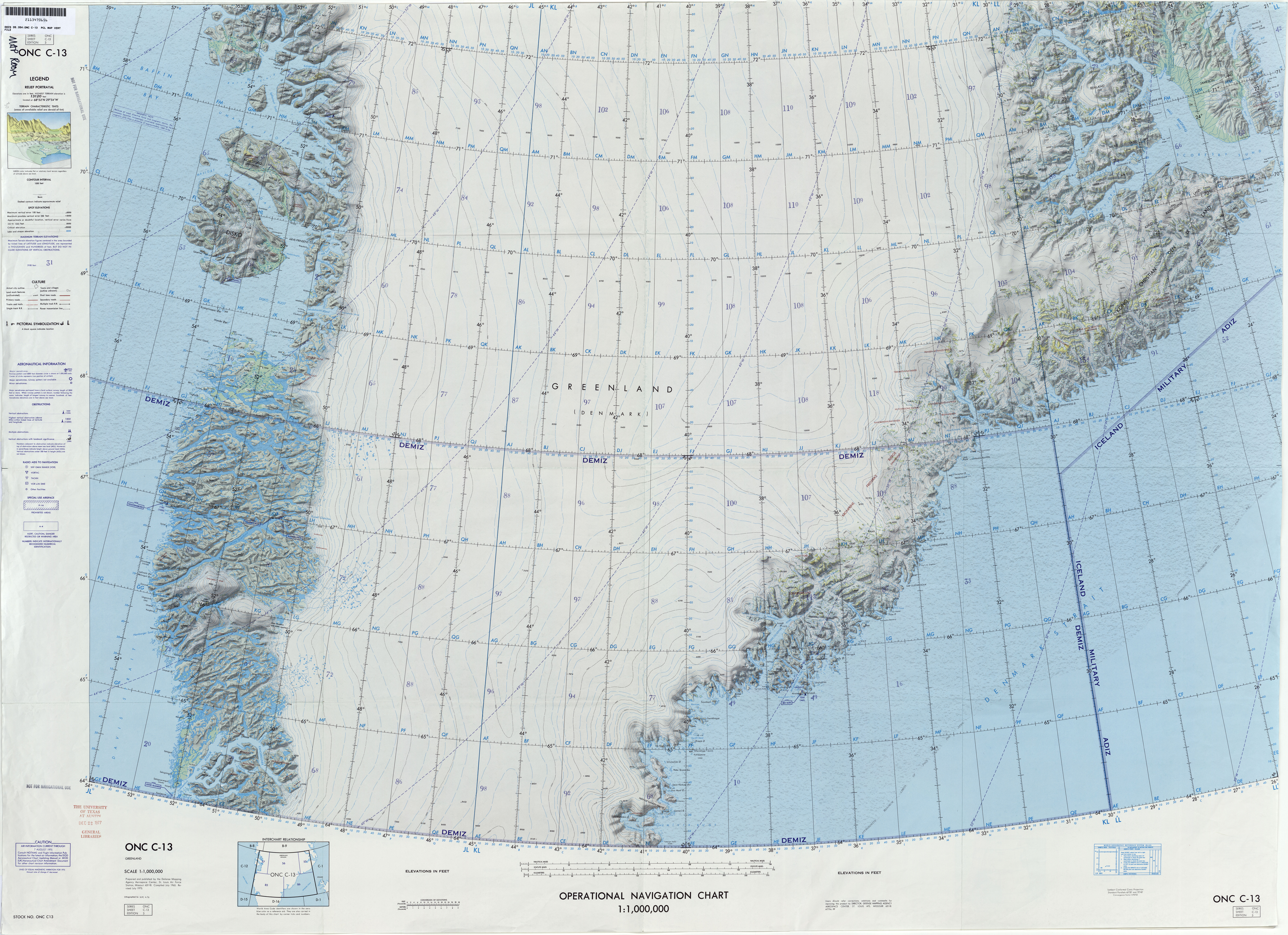
Map of Greenland section.

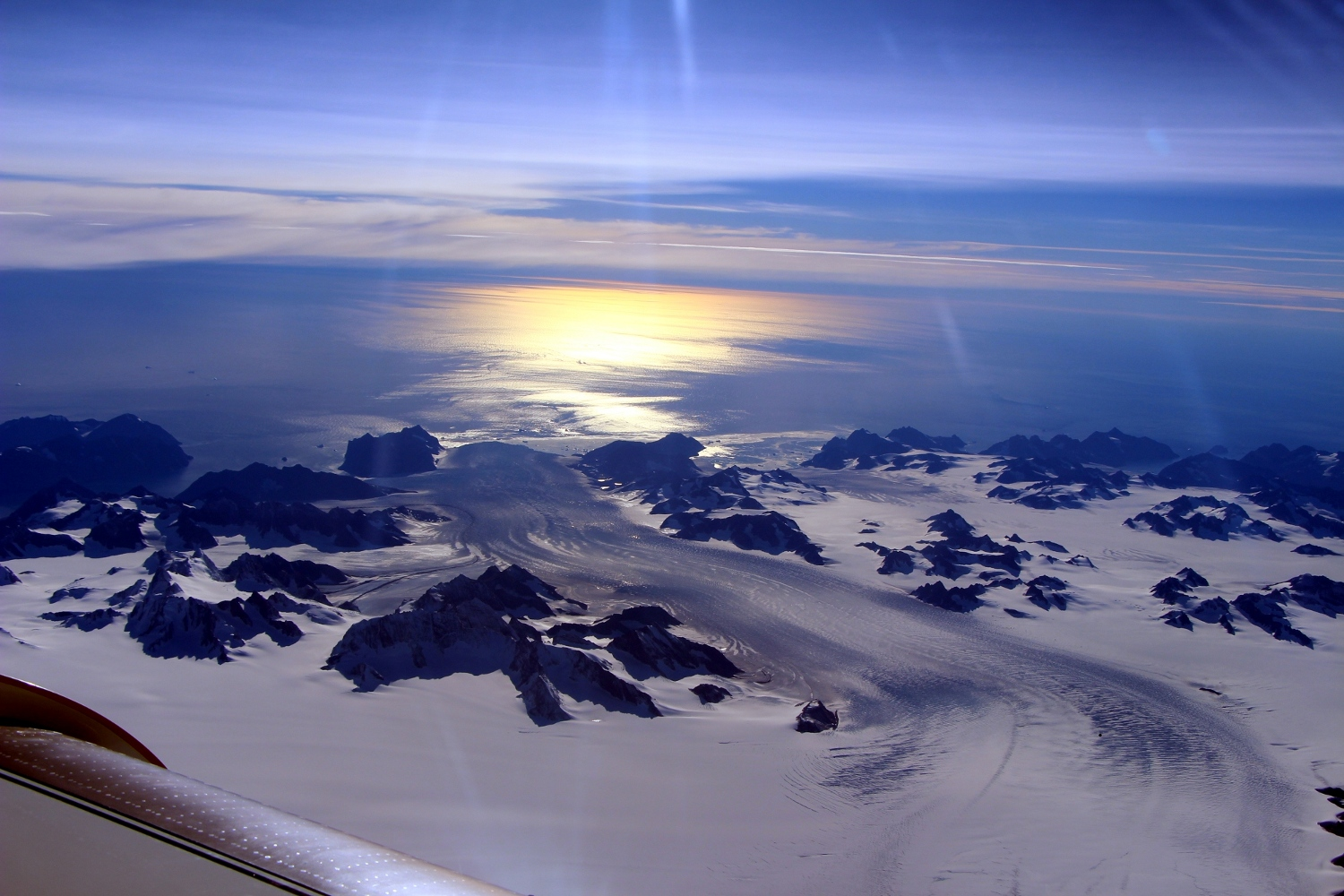
The K.J.V. Steenstrup Glacier as seen during an Operation IceBridge flight on 11 September 2016.

== See also ==
- List of glaciers in Greenland
