= Qaasuitsup =

Former municipality of Greenland

Qaasuitsup Kommunia
- Municipality of Greenland
- 2009–2017
- Coat of arms

- Location of Qaasuitsup within Greenland
- Capital: Ilulissat
- Area
  - Coordinates: 69°13′N 51°06′W
  - 2015: 660,000 km^{2} (250,000 sq mi)
- Population
  - 2015: 17,168
- History
  - Established: 1 January 2009
  - Disestablished: 31 December 2017
Preceded by
Aasiaat
Kangaatsiaq
Ilulissat
Qaanaaq
Qasigiannguit
Qeqertarsuaq
Uummannaq
Upernavik
Succeeded by
Avannaata
Qeqertalik
- Population data:; ISO code: GL-QA; Calling code: +299

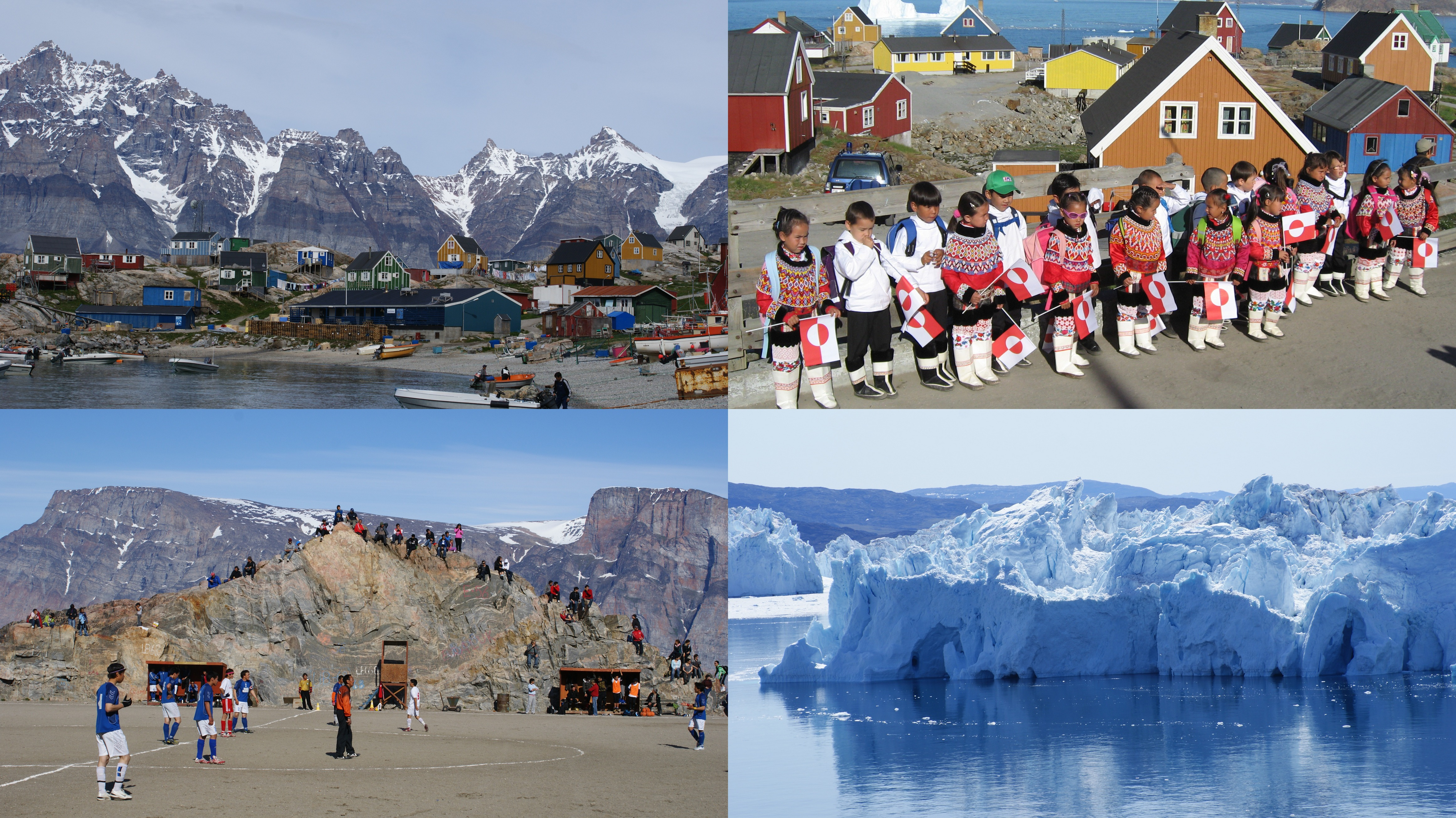
Clockwise from top left: Ukkusissat, Upernavik, Ilulissat Icefjord, Uummannaq

Qaasuitsup (Greenlandic pronunciation: [qaːsuitt͡sup̚], Place of Polar Darkness) was a municipality in Greenland, operational from 1 January 2009 to 31 December 2017. As of January 2015, its population was 17,168. The administrative centre of the municipality was in Ilulissat (Jacobshavn).

== Creation ==
The municipality consisted of the former municipalities of western and northern Greenland, each named after the biggest settlement:

- Aasiaat Municipality (currently in Qeqertalik)
- Kangaatsiaq Municipality (currently in Qeqertalik)
- Ilulissat Municipality (currently in Avannaata)
- Qaanaaq Municipality (currently in Avannaata)
- Qasigiannguit Municipality (currently in Qeqertalik)
- Qeqertarsuaq Municipality (currently in Qeqertalik)
- Uummannaq Municipality (currently in Avannaata)
- Upernavik Municipality (currently in Avannaata)

== Dissolution ==
Effective 1 January 2018, Qaasuitsup Kommunia was partitioned into two new municipalities:

- Avannaata Kommunia: comprising Ilulissat, Uummannaq, Upernavik, Qaanaaq and surrounding settlements; and
- Kommune Qeqertalik: comprising Aasiaat, Qasigiannguit, Qeqertarsuaq, Kangaatsiaq and surrounding settlements.

== Geography ==
The municipality was located in northwestern Greenland. With an area of 660,000 km^{2} (254,827.4 mi^{2}), it was the largest municipality in the world by area, larger than France at 643,427 km^{2} (248,428.6 mi^{2}).

In the south, it was flanked by the Qeqqata municipality. In the southeast, it was bordered by the Sermersooq municipality, however this border ran north–south (45° West meridian) through the center of the Greenland ice sheet (Greenlandic: Sermersuaq), and as such was free of traffic. In the east and northeast it was bordered by the Northeast Greenland National Park.

At the southern end of the municipal coastline were the waters of Disko Bay, an inlet of the larger Baffin Bay, which to the north edges into the island of Greenland in the form of Melville Bay. The coastline of northeastern Baffin Bay is dotted with islands of the Upernavik Archipelago, which was entirely contained within the municipality. In the far northwest near Qaanaaq and Siorapaluk, the municipal shores extended into Nares Strait, which separates Greenland from Ellesmere Island.

Denmark claimed Hans Island as part of Qaasuitsup (now Avannaata), while Canada considers it to be part of the Nunavut region of Qikiqtaaluk.

== Administrative divisions ==
=== Now in present Avannaata Municipality ===
==== Ilulissat area ====
- Ilulissat (Jacobshavn)
- Ilimanaq (Claushavn)
- Oqaatsut (Hollandshuk)
- Qeqertaq (Øen)
- Saqqaq (Solsiden)

==== Qaanaaq area ====
- Qaanaaq (Thule)
- Qeqertat
- Savissivik
- Siorapaluk

==== Uummannaq area ====
- Uummannaq
- Ikerasak
- Illorsuit
- Niaqornat
- Nuugaatsiaq
- Qaarsut
- Saattut
- Ukkusissat

==== Upernavik area ====
- Upernavik
- Aappilattoq
- Innaarsuit
- Kangersuatsiaq (Prøven)
- Kullorsuaq
- Naajaat
- Nutaarmiut
- Nuussuaq (Kraulshavn)
- Tasiusaq
- Tussaaq Island
- Upernavik Kujalleq (Søndre Upernavik)

=== Now in present Qeqertalik Municipality ===
==== Aasiaat area ====
- Aasiaat (Egedesminde)
- Akunnaaq
- Kitsissuarsuit (Hunde Ejlande, Dog's Island)

==== Kangaatsiaq area ====
- Kangaatsiaq (Prøven)
- Attu
- Iginniarfik
- Ikerasaarsuk
- Niaqornaarsuk

==== Qasigiannguit area ====
- Qasigiannguit (Christianshåb)
- Ikamiut

==== Qeqertarsuaq area ====
- Qeqertarsuaq (Godhavn)
- Kangerluk (Diskofjord)

== Language ==
Kalaallisut, the West Greenlandic dialect, is spoken in the towns and settlements of the western and northwestern coasts. Inuktun is also spoken in and around Qaanaaq.

== See also ==
- KANUKOKA
