= Qaanaaq Municipality =

Former municipality of Greenland

Coordinates: 78°N 59°W

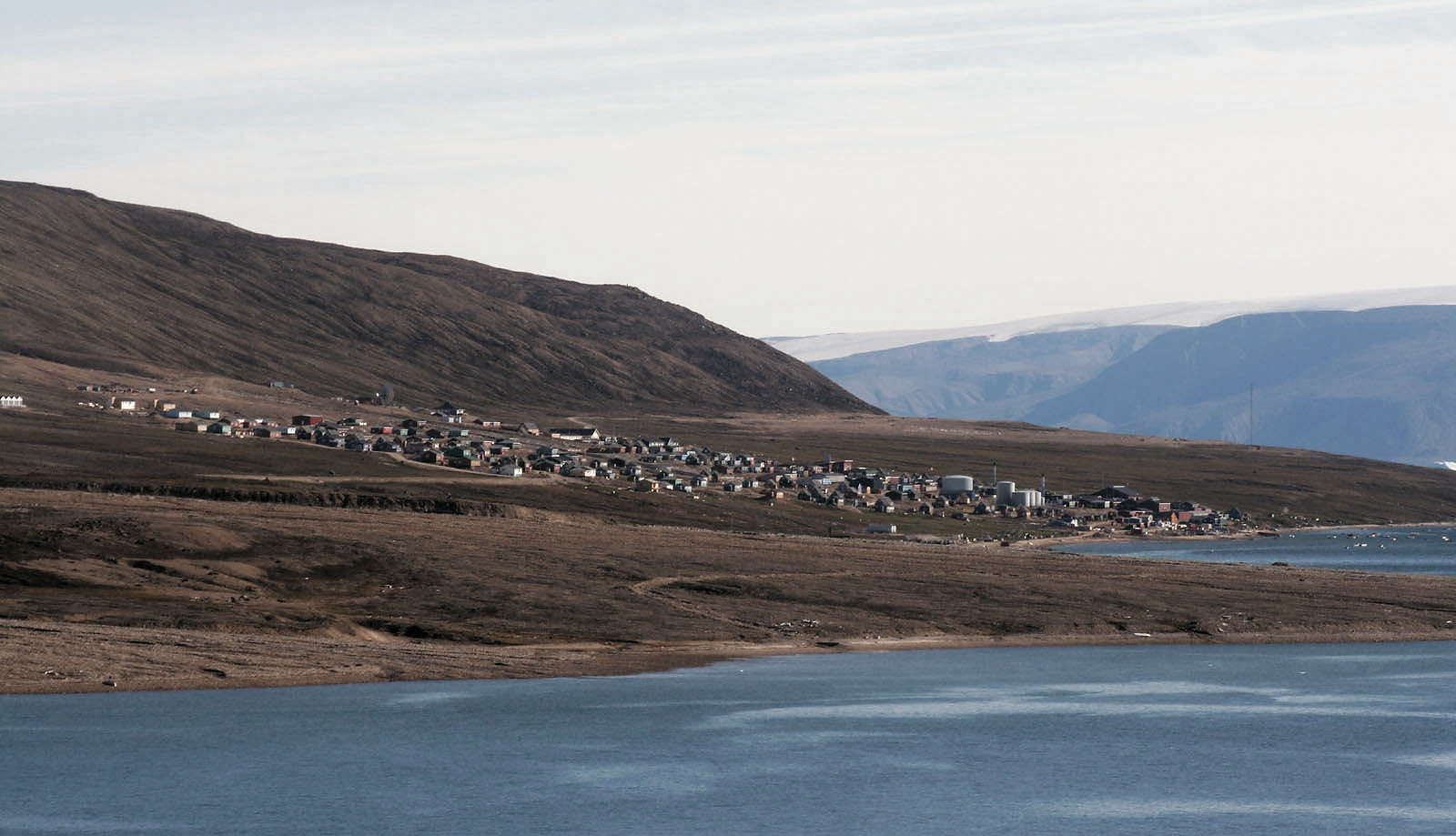
Qaanaaq, Greenland

Qaanaaq Municipality was the only municipality in the county of North Greenland (Avannaa). It is now a district in the municipality of Avannaata.

On 22 January 1968 a B-52 crashed 11 km (7 mi) south of Pituffik Space Base. Nuclear bombs were lost and debris scattered over the area in the accident.

The municipality has a population of 683 (as of 1 January 2026). The town of Qaanaaq has a population of 586. In addition to the town, there are four inhabited villages:

- Savissivik: pop. 40, in the northern part of Melville Bay, in the south of the municipality
- Qeqertat: 25 (on the main island of the Harward Øer)
- Siorapaluk: 32 (one of the northernmost settlements in the world at 77°47'N)

All villages are losing population, since people are moving to Qaanaaq. Qaanaaq’s population peaked in 2011 at 678 and has since been decreasing. Historically, the number of villages has been higher, but some have been abandoned. This process of population concentration in the towns is observed through all of Greenland.

Etah, an abandoned village which once was the northernmost village of the world (at 78°19'N), lies 78 km (48 mi) northwest of Siorapaluk. Annoatok, once a small hunting station, was slightly further north (at 78°33'N) and about 24 km (15 mi) from Etah. Several abandoned settlements even further north lie in the eastern part of Inglefield Land and in Washington Land.

The municipality has an area of 225,500 km^{2} (87,066 mi^{2}), a large portion of which is ice cap area. It is the largest municipality in Greenland and one of the largest in the world (the surface area is larger than the United Kingdom). It extends from Melville Bay in the south to Washington Land in the north. It borders on Upernavik Municipality on the south, on the unincorporated area of the Northeast Greenland National Park on the east, on the Arctic Ocean on the north and west, and on the Nares Strait, which separates North Greenland from Ellesmere Island of Nunavut, Canada on the west. The North Water Polynya borders the western part of the municipality.
