= K. J. V. Steenstrup =

Danish geologist (1842–1913)

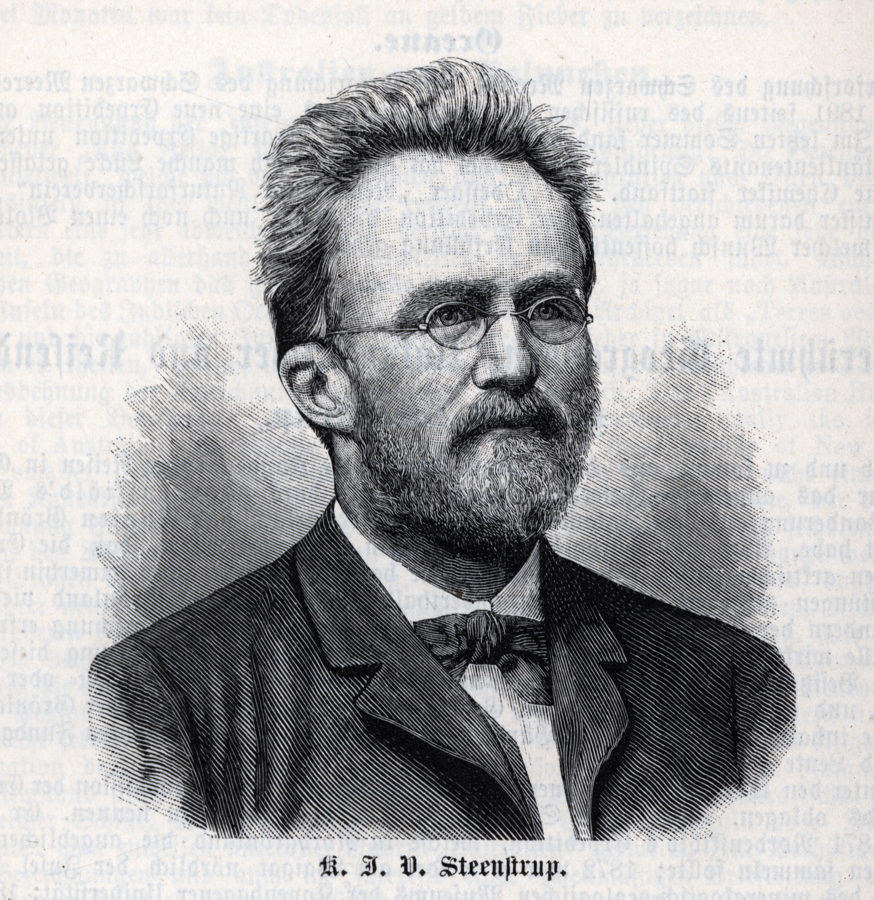

Knud Johannes Vogelius Steenstrup (7 September 1842 – 6 May 1913) was a Danish geologist. He was most noted as an explorer of Greenland.

== Biography ==
Steenstrup was born at Høstemark Mill in Mou Sogn, Jutland, Denmark. He was the son of Johan Peter Steenstrup (1814–49) and Sinned Claudine Lund (1803–63), He was a nephew of zoologist Japetus Steenstrup (1813-1897).

Steenstrup took a degree in pharmacy in 1863 and worked as assistant at the University of Copenhagen Geological Museum from 1866 to 1889. He made in total nine journeys to Greenland, one of which lasted 2.5 years. He made remarkable collections of Cretaceous and Paleogene plant fossils in central West Greenland, which were later treated by swiss botanist Oswald Heer (1809–1883). Heer initially considered the fossils to be Miocene in age.

Steenstrup proved that the large iron-rich blocks found by A.E. Nordenskiöld on Disko, and claimed by him to be meteorites, were in fact native iron extrusions in basalt. This finding made his name well known and he was subsequently made honorary member of the Mineralogical Society of Great Britain and Ireland.

From 1889 to his death in 1913, he was state geologist at the Geological Survey of Denmark. Unfortunately, a large proportion of his Greenlandic collections were lost when Christiansborg Palace burned in 1884. In his home country, he made pioneering studies of dune morphology.

Steenstrup was the first chairman of the Danish Geological Society from 1893 to 1898. In 1895, he was made an honorary corresponding member of the Royal Geographical Society in London, He was appointed Honorary Doctor at the University of Copenhagen in 1906. From 1896 he was a member of the Commission for Scientific Investigations in Greenland and from 1902 fellow of the Royal Danish Academy of Sciences and Letters. The minerals steenstrupine-(Ce) and thorosteenstrupine were named after him.

The twin K.J.V. Steenstrup Glaciers (K.I.V. Steenstrups Nordre Bræ & K.I.V. Steenstrups Søndre Bræ) in King Christian IX Land, eastern Greenland, are named after him.
