= Upernavik Municipality =

Former municipality of Greenland

Upernavik Municipality was one of the municipalities of Greenland, until 31 December 2008, when it and seven other municipalities were consolidated to form the state of Qaasuitsup. The municipality was home to approximately 3,000 people, while 1,144 live in the town of Upernavik, and the remainder live in ten other settlements, including Kullorsuaq, with a population of about 400. Air Greenland operates air services to Upernavik.

== Settlements in the former Upernavik Municipality ==
- Upernavik
- Upernavik Kujalleq
- Kangersuatsiaq
- Aappilattoq
- Tussaaq
- Naajaat
- Innaarsuit
- Tasiusaq
- Nutaarmiut
- Nuussuaq
- Kullorsuaq
