= Radoboj =

- Municipality
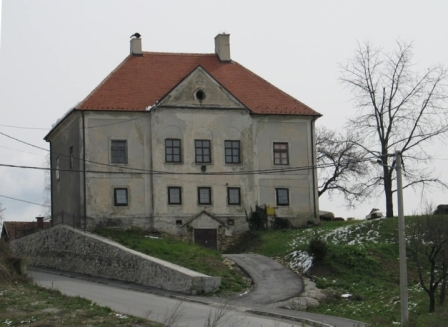
- Rectory in Radoboj
- Interactive map of Radoboj
- Location within Krapina-Zagorje County Location within Croatia
- Coordinates: 46°09′59.04″N 15°55′24.96″E
- Country: Croatia
- County: Krapina-Zagorje County

Government
  - Municipal Mayor: Anđelko Topolovec (Independent)

Area
  - Municipality: 33.1 km^{2} (12.8 sq mi)
  - Urban: 13.0 km^{2} (5.0 sq mi)

Population (2021)
  - Municipality: 2,981
  - Density: 90.1/km^{2} (233/sq mi)
  - Urban: 1,131
  - Urban density: 87.0/km^{2} (225/sq mi)
- Website: radoboj.hr

Radoboj is a village and municipality in Krapina-Zagorje County in Croatia. It is particularly famous as a major fossil site.

== History ==
During the 19th Century a large number of fossils from the Miocene were excavated here. Especially notable are the well preserved insects fossils which were described by the Swiss palaeontologist Oswald Heer. Most of this type material is currently in Landesmuseum Joanneum, Graz, there is also considerable material from Radoboj in the Natural History Museum in Zagreb.

== Demographics ==
In the 2021 census, the total population was 2,981, in the following settlements:

- Bregi Radobojski, population 357
- Gorjani Sutinski, population 121
- Gornja Šemnica, population 568
- Jazvine, population 357
- Kraljevec Radobojski, population 44
- Kraljevec Šemnički, population 99
- Orehovec Radobojski, population 258
- Radoboj, population 1,131
- Strahinje Radobojsko, population 46

In the 2021 census, 99.73% of the population were Croats.

Radoboj: Population trends 1857–2021
v

population	2648	3020	3353	3750	3915	4236	4231	4599	4943	4868	4436	4084	3869	3665	3513	3387	2981
	1857	1869	1880	1890	1900	1910	1921	1931	1948	1953	1961	1971	1981	1991	2001	2011	2021

Sources: Croatian Bureau of Statistics publications

== Administration ==
The current mayor of Radoboj is Anđelko Topolovec and the Radoboj Municipal Council consists of 13 seats.

Groups	Councilors per group
Independents	8 / 13
HDZ	3 / 13
SDP	2 / 13

== Sport ==
- Football club NK Radoboj.

== Notable people ==
- Sida Košutić, novelist
  - Literary manifestation Sida Košutić Days in her honor.

== Bibliography ==
- Špoljar, Davor (16 June 2015). "Settling of Radoboj and Surrounding Areas in Prehistory". Kaj: časopis za književnost, umjetnost, kulturu. 231 (332–333): 89–121. eISSN 1848-7920.
