= Oswald Heer =

Swiss naturalist (1809–1883)

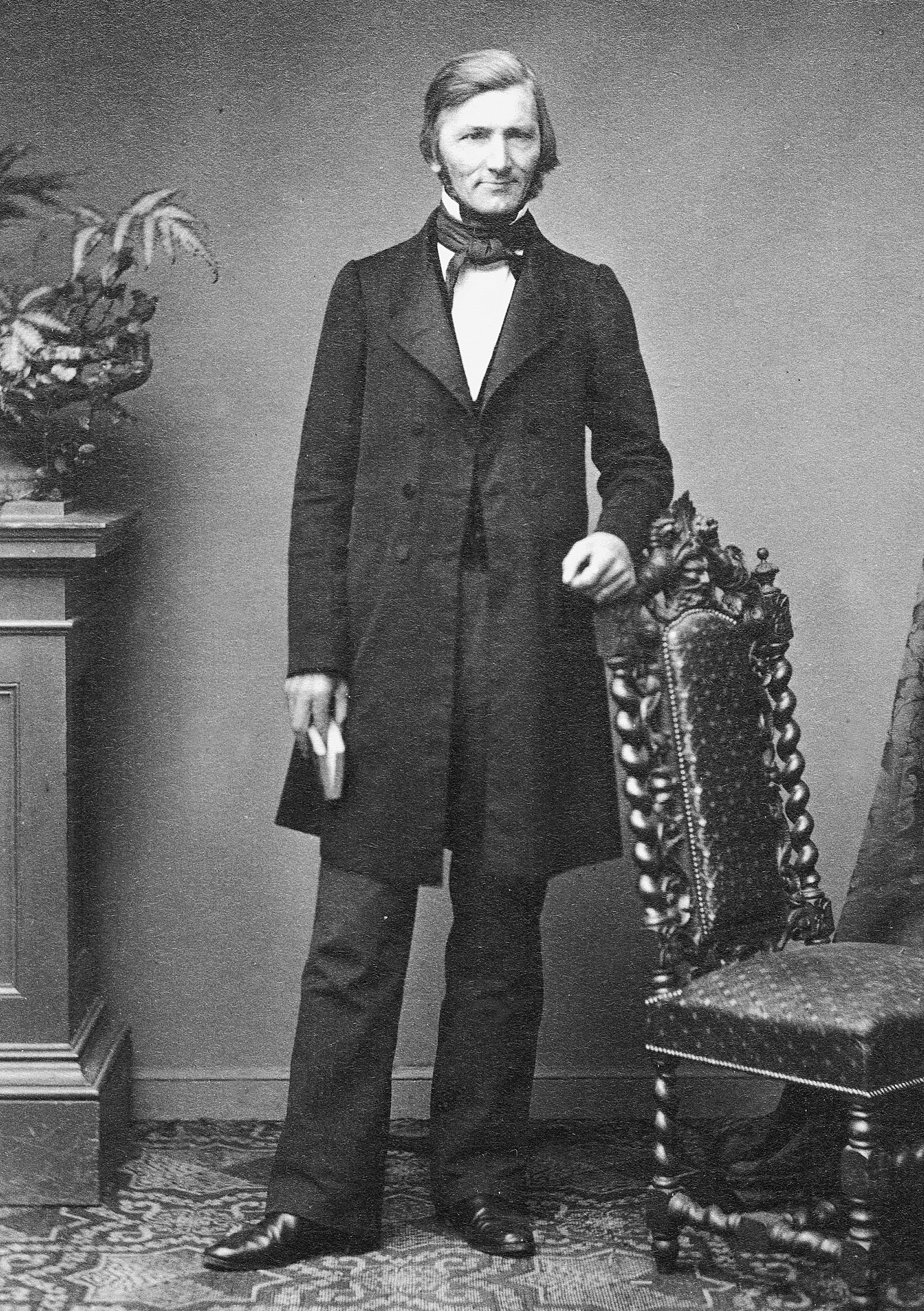
- Born: 31 August 1809; Niederuzwil, Switzerland
- Died: 27 September 1883 (aged 74); Lausanne
- Awards: Wollaston Medal (1874); Royal Medal (1877)

Oswald Heer (or Oswald von Heer) (31 August 1809 – 27 September 1883), Swiss geologist and naturalist, was born at Niederuzwil in Canton of St. Gallen and died in Lausanne.

== Biography ==
Oswald Heer was educated as a clergyman at Halle and took holy orders, and he also graduated as Doctor of Philosophy and medicine. Early in life his interest was aroused in entomology, on which subject he acquired special knowledge, and later he took up the study of plants and became one of the pioneers in paleobotany, distinguished for his researches on the Miocene flora.

In 1837, Carl Daniel Friedrich Meissner (1800–1874) a Swiss botanist named a genus of flowering plants (in the family of Anacardiaceae) from South Africa after him, Heeria.

In 1851, Heer became professor of botany in the university of Zürich, and for some time he was the director of what is now the Old Botanical Garden in that city. He directed his attention to the Tertiary plants and insects of Switzerland. In 1863 (with William Pengelly, Phil. Trans., 1862) he investigated the plant-remains from the lignite-deposits of Bovey Tracey in Devon, regarding them as of Miocene age; but they are now classed as Eocene.

Heer also reported on the Miocene flora of Arctic regions (fossil plant remains brought back from Northwest Greenland by K. J. V. Steenstrup), on the plants of the Pleistocene lignites of Dürnten, and on the cereals of some of the lake-dwellings (Die Pflanzen der Pfahlbauten, 1866).

In 1862, Heer was elected as a member to the American Philosophical Society.

Charles Darwin regarded Heer as an authority on fossil plants, and corresponded with him. The two men disagreed over evolution, but were on cordial terms. In a letter in 1875, Heer described to Darwin in some detail a new dicotyledonous angiosperm fossil that he had identified in the lower Cretaceous in the arctic, which appeared to allow slightly more time for the evolution of dicots than Darwin had previously been aware of. Heer published a critique of Darwinism in volume 2 of his 1867 book The Primaeval World of Switzerland, concluding "All these facts afford arguments against a slow and uniformly progressive transformation of species, and lead to the conclusion that the transformation of organic nature took place in a period of comparatively limited duration" (p. 288). He believed in progressive creation: "Times of creation occurred during which was accomplished a remoulding of organic types, and there was a primaeval epoch during which the first species were brought into being. Even if the first species were extremely simple, for them an act of creation must be admitted, an act without example in modern times; for in our days plants and animals of decidedly low forms proceed from species already in existence" (p. 291, The Primaeval World of Switzerland).

During a great part of his career Heer was hampered by slender means and ill-health, but his services to science were acknowledged in 1874 when the Geological Society of London awarded to him the Wollaston medal. He died at Lausanne on 27 September 1883.

Heer published Flora Tertiaria Helvetiae (3 vols., 1855–1859); Die Urwelt der Schweiz (1865), and Flora fossilis Arctica (1868–1883) and with Eduard Heinrich Graeffe. The cape Heerodden in Nordenskiöld Land on Spitsbergen is named after him, as well as the Bear Island mountain Oswaldfjellet.

== Works ==
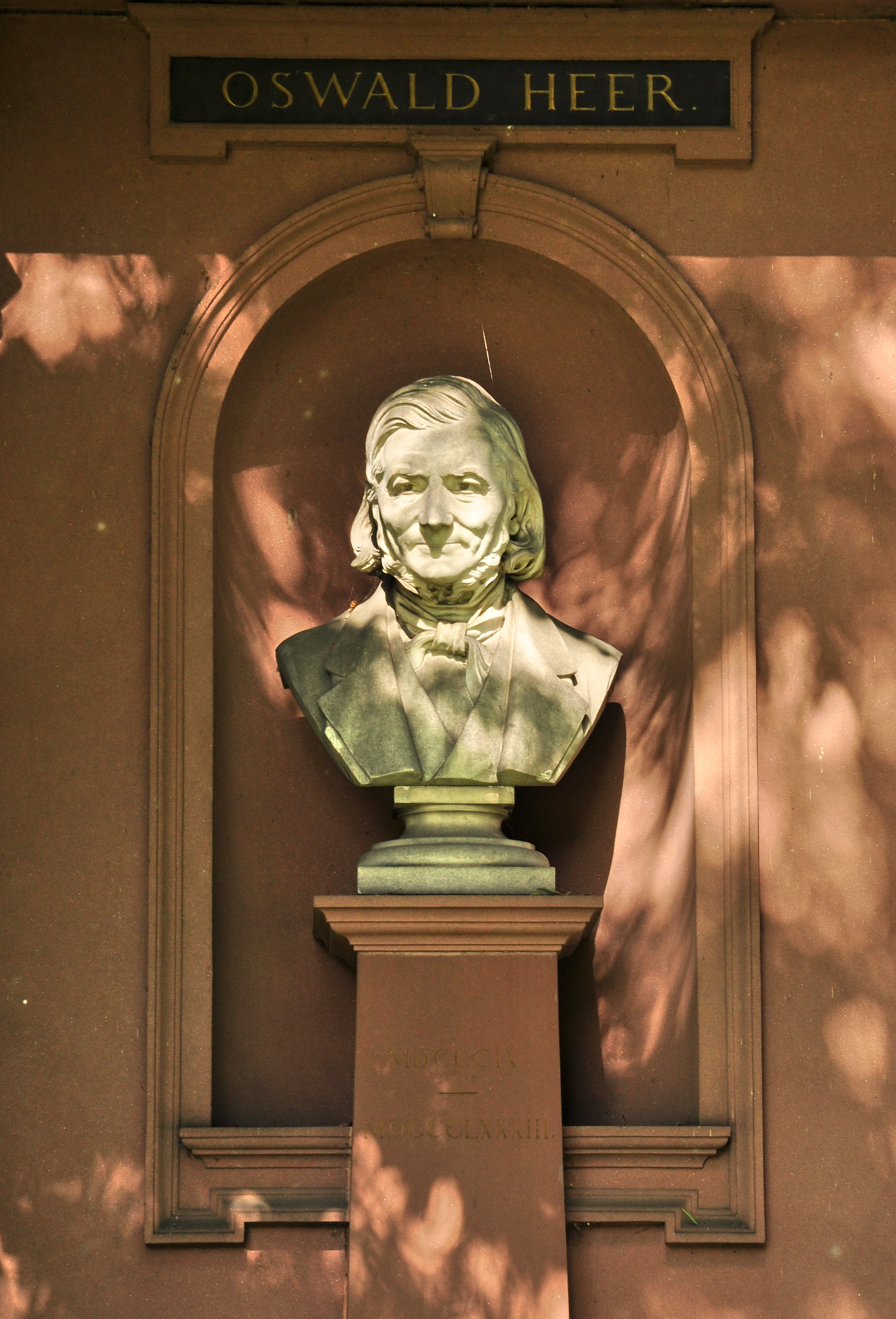
Memorial at the Old Botanical Garden, Zürich

Heer published the following works:

- 1840 - Analytische Tabellen zu Bestimmung der phanerogamischen Pflanzengattungen der Schweiz.
- 1840 - Flora der Schweiz; (with Johannes Jacob Hegetschweiler).
- 1846 - Der Kanton GlarusFormularende
- 1849 - "Die Insektenfauna der Tertiärgebilde von Oeningen und von Radoboj in Croatien" in series Neue Denkschriften der Allgemeinen Schweizerischen Gesellschaft für die gesammten Naturwissenschaft
- 1855-1859 - Flora tertiaria Helvetiae
- 1862 - Beiträge zur Insektenfauna Oeningens
- 1862 - Beiträge zur Fossilen Flora von Sumatra
- 1862 - Beiträge zur Insektenfauna Oeningens: Coleoptera, Geodephagen. .. Lamellicornen und Buprestiden
- 1863 - On the lignite formation of Bovey Tracey, Devonshire; (with William Pengelly).
- 1865 - Die Urwelt der Schweiz
- 1865 - Die Pflanzen der Pfahlbauten
- 1867 - Fossile Hymenopteren aus Oeningen und Radoboy
- 1868-1882 - „Flora fossilis arctica - Die fossile Flora der Polarländer“
- "1868 in Graeffe Reise im Innern der Insel Viti Levu. Neujahrsblatt der Naturforschenden Gesellschaft in Zurich 70: 1-48 (1868). (ngzh.ch)
- 1869 - Miocene baltische Flora
- 1869 - Ueber die Braunkohlenpflanzen von Bornstädt
- 1870 - Die Miocene Flora und Fauna Spitzbergens
- 1871 - Fossile Flora der Bären Insel
- 1872 - Le monde primitif de la Suisse
- 1874 - Die Kreide-Flora der Arctischen Zone
- 1874 - Anmärkningar öfver de af svenska polarexpeditionen 1872-73 upptäckte fossila växter.
- 1876 - Beiträge zur fossilen Flora Spitzbergens: Gegründet auf die Sammlungen der schwedischen Expedition vom Jahre 1872 auf 1873.
- 1876 - The Primaeval World of Switzerland (Edited by James Heywood) Volume 1 and Volume 2.
- 1877 - Flora fossilis Helvetiae: die vorweltliche Flora der Schweiz
- 1878 - Beiträge zur fossilen Flora Sibiriens und des Amurlandes
- 1884 - Analytische Tabellen zur Bestimmung der phanerogamischen Pflanzengattungen der Schweiz
