= Apusiaajik Glacier =

Glacier in Greenland

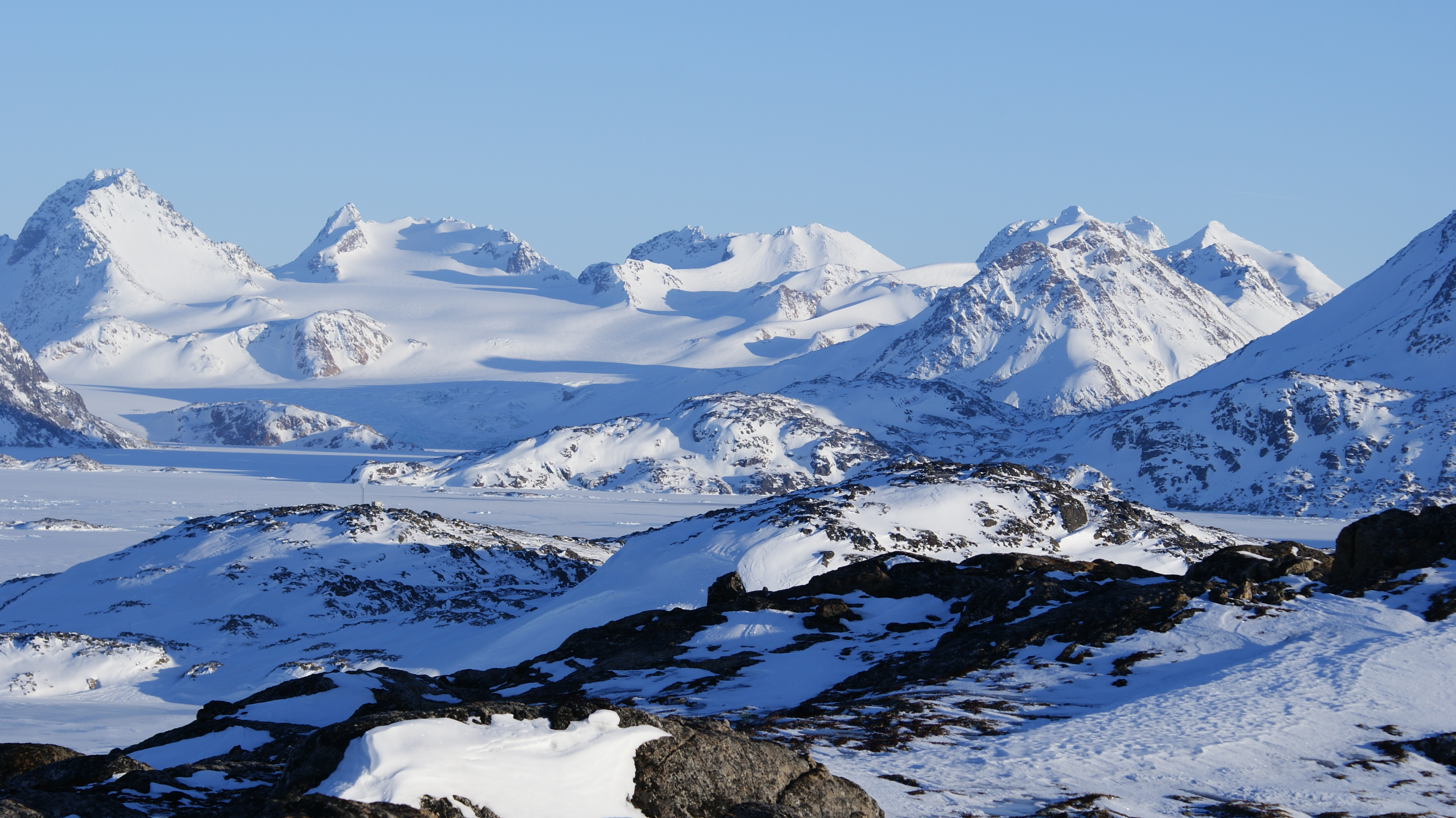
- Apusiaajik Glacier seen from Kulusuk Island

- Location within Greenland
- Type: Mountain glacier
- Location: Apusiaajik Island, Sermersooq, Greenland
- Coordinates: 65°39′10″N 37°03′25″W
- Terminus: Torsuut Tunoq, North Atlantic

Apusiaajik Glacier is a tidewater glacier on the uninhabited Apusiaajik Island in the Sermersooq municipality on the southeastern shore of Greenland.

== Tourism ==
During summer, the glacier edge is a popular tourist destination for boat trips from Tasiilaq and Kulusuk. During winter it is possible to reach the front of the glacier crossing the frozen Torsuut Tunoq sound on foot or on snowmobile.
