= Ammassalik Fjord =

Fjord in southeastern Greenland

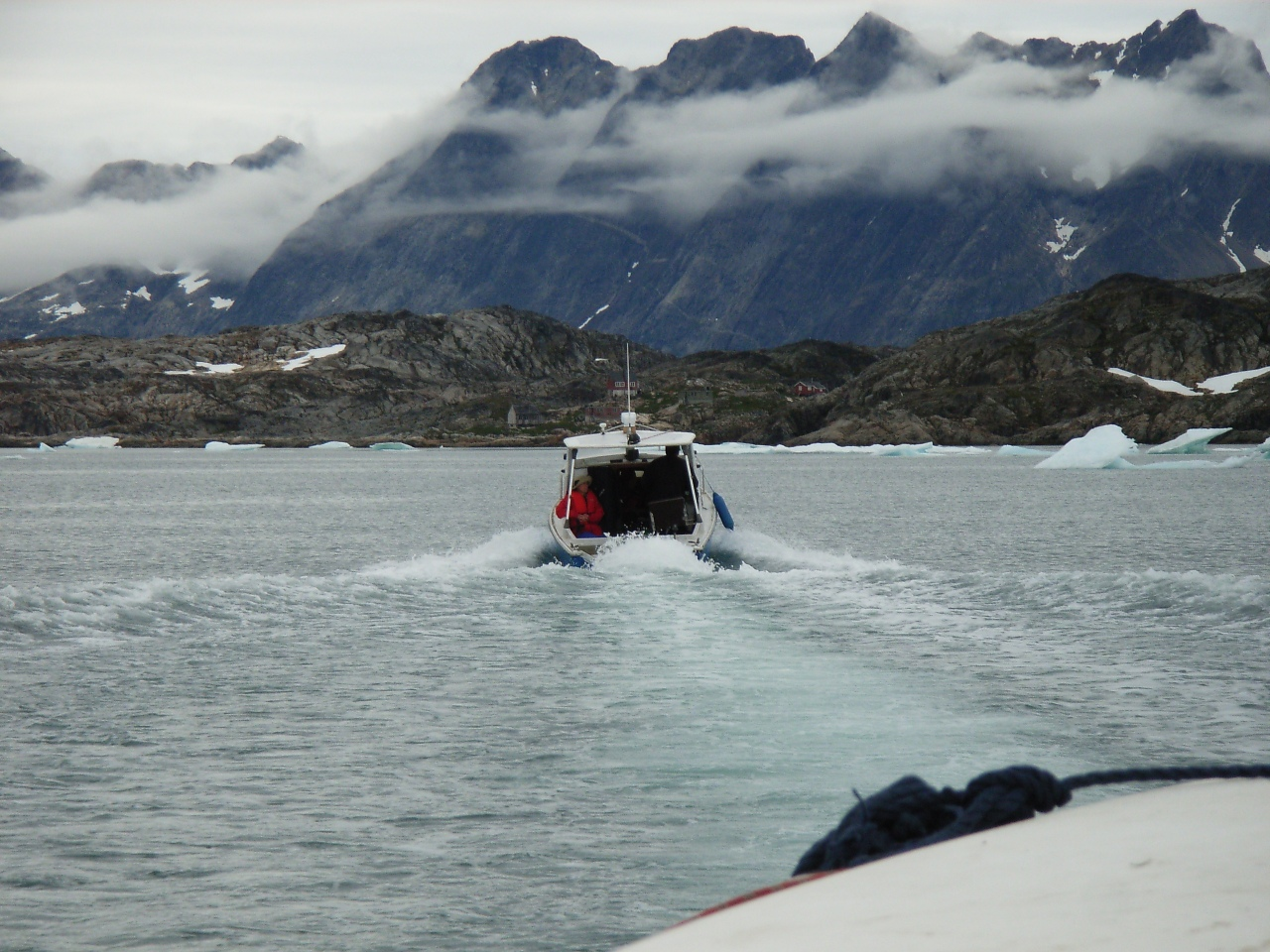
- Steep shoreline of the fjord

- Location within Greenland
- Location: Arctic
- Coordinates: 65°50′N 37°3′W
- Ocean/sea sources: North Atlantic Ocean
- Basin countries: Greenland
- Max. length: 41 km (25.5 mi)

Ammassalik Fjord (old spelling: Angmagssalik Fjord) is a 41 km (25.5 mi) long fjord in the Sermersooq municipality in southeastern Greenland.

== Geography ==
Ammassalik Fjord

The head of the fjord at 65°58′N 37°06′W is formed by the confluence of two narrow, tributary fjords: Qingertivaq Fjord and Tasiilaq Fjord (one of two fjords of that name). The fjord has a north-to-south orientation in its northern part, to then turn midway to the south-west-south at approximately 65°50′N 37°03′W. While the shores of the northern part separate peninsulas of the mainland of Greenland, the southern, progressively wider half of the fjord separates the large Ammassalik Island in the west from islands of the eponymous Ammassalik Archipelago in the east and southeast, including the largest, Apusiaajik Island.

The fjord is joined by narrow waterways with other waterbodies in the region: the Ikaasartivaq Strait separating Ammassalik Island from the mainland connects the fjord to the wider Sermilik Fjord in the west, while the Torsuut Tunoq sound and the Ikaasaartik Strait connect the fjord to the open North Atlantic.

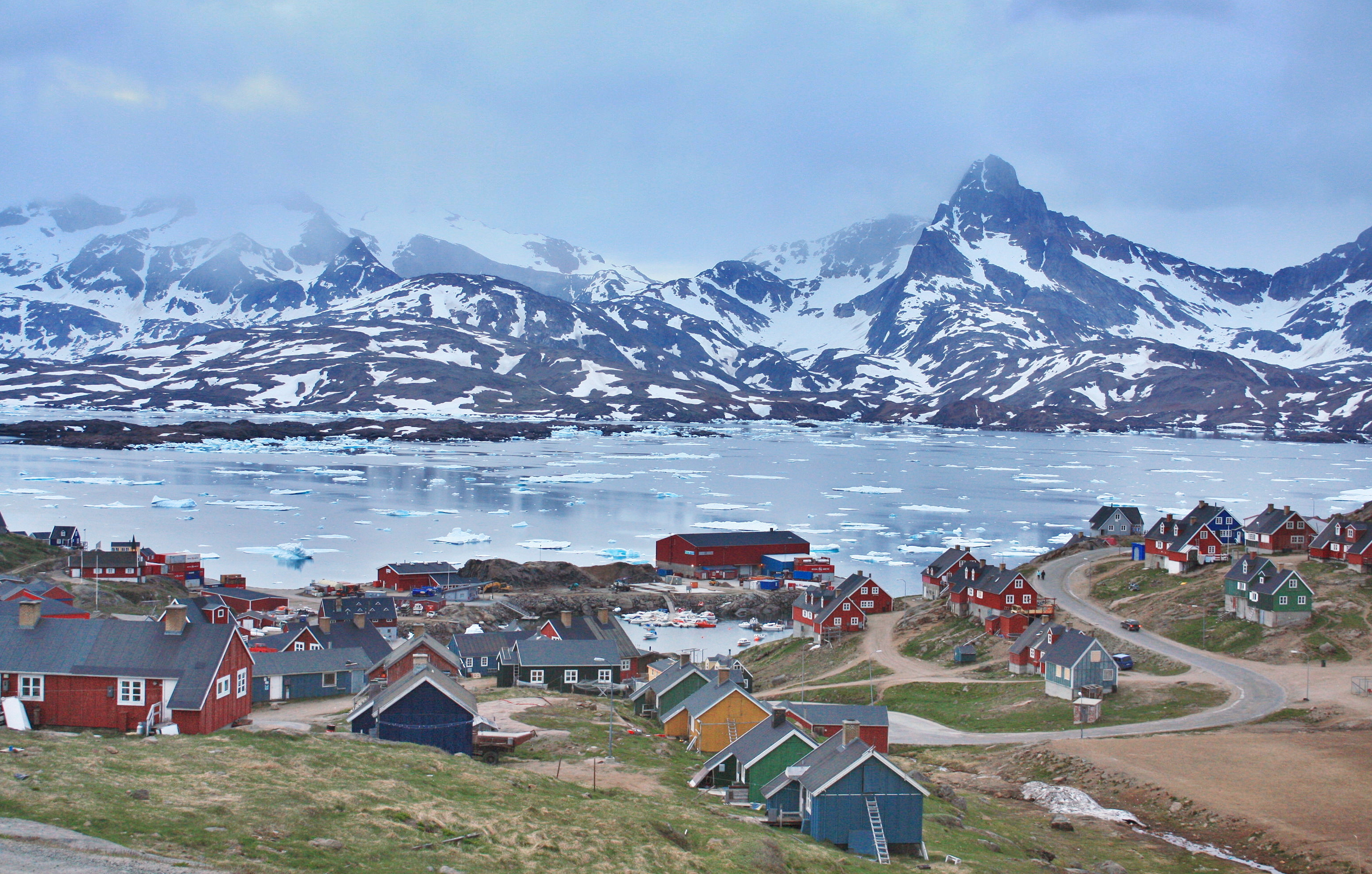
Tasiilaq Fjord opens into the bay in the North Atlantic south of the wide mouth of Ammassalik Fjord

== Settlement ==
=== History ===
Gustav Holm writes that in the winter of 1884–5, there were 225 Inuit living on the fjord in seven villages:

- Tasiusarsik kangigdlek (35), near the western mouth of the fjord
- Kangarsik (34) and Norsit (25), on Kulusuk Island
- Umivik (19) and Kumarmiut (28), on Apusiaajik Island
- Ingmikertok (37), on a small island near Kumarmiut
- Norajik (47), on the island at the end of the wider, outer part of the fjord

=== Present day ===
There are three settlements in the vicinity of the fjord. The only village on the mainland is Kuummiit, located on the central fjord's eastern coast, perched on the tip of a partially glaciated peninsula. The main settlement of the Ammassalik archipelago is the town of Tasiilaq, located on the island of Ammassalik, near the mouth of the tributary Tasiilaq Fjord (Danish: Kong Oscars Havn), just south of the mouth of Ammassalik Fjord. Further to the southeast, Kulusuk village occupies the northern shore of Kulusuk Island.
