= Umivik, Ammassalik =

Umivik
- Location in Sermersooq, Greenland
- Coordinates: 65°39′N 037°12′W
- Country: Greenland

Umivik is an abandoned settlement at Ammassalik Fjord. As of the winter of 1884–5, 19 Inuit lived there in a single dwelling. The U.S. National Geospatial-Intelligence Agency classifies Umiviik/Umîvik as a ruin at 65.65°N 37.2°W, which is on the west side of Apusiaajik Island.

== See also ==
- Ammassalik wooden maps, made by a man named Kunit from Umivik
