= DYE Stations =

Early warning radar stations in Canada

DYE Stations were the eastern extension of the Distant Early Warning Line (DEW Line) in the North American Arctic throughout Greenland (DEW Greenland Extension, "DEW East") (Note: Printed after December 1958--the Reno ADS (p. 2 map) became part of the 25 AD on 15 Feb 1959.) and Iceland. The DEW Line sites called DYE Stations were equipped with the 600 MHz AN/FPS-30 long-range radar within geodesic domes of about 60 ft (18 m) diameter. Crews were regularly supplied and rotated by C-130 Hercules (Hercs) aircraft of the 109th Airlift Wing (New York Air National Guard [NYANG]) staging through Sondrestrom Air Base.

== Background ==
The DEW Line became operational on August 13, 1957, with "CINCNORAD...operational control of the Cape Lisburne-Cape Dyer" radar stations as with other air defense elements. On June 30, 1958, the eastern DEW Extension had four stations and there were four Designated Engineering Representatives (DERs) and four airborne early warning and control (AEW&C) aircraft operating for the Atlantic Barrier and on July 19, 1958, DYE 1 (Qaqqatoqaq) (DYE 4 (Kulusuk Island) on August 3) was begun by Western Electric using helicopter-assisted sealift at the coasts and airlift from Sondrestrom Air Base for the interior stations. By October 1, 1958, DYE communications were linked to the NORAD Combat Operations Center at Ent Air Force Base via the AT&T Denver Toll Test Center.

From 1954, the United States Air Force expected that the air defense radar network would have to extend across the North Atlantic to Europe or the Azores, and by early 1956 studies to this effect were approved by the Joint Chiefs of Staff. After successful completion of the DEW Line, in 1957 U.S.-Canadian attention turned to the implementation of plans to close the North Atlantic radar gap with physical stations to replace the radar early warning aircraft EC-121 Warning Stars then patrolling the ocean. Arctic veteran, Colonel Bernt Balchen, preferred a line going north around Greenland's polar coast, and others suggested a coastal line south to Cape Farewell, but eventually the service settled on a direct line across the ice cap to Iceland, the Faroes, and the United Kingdom. An initial plan to place a main station at Kangeq near Cape Farewell was abandoned before construction began.

Negotiations with Denmark, concluding with an agreement on 20 March 1958, settled on four stations in Greenland, one on a mountain near Holsteinsborg (Sisimiut), two innovative sites in central Greenland, and one at Kulusuk on Kulusuk Island near Tasiilaq (formerly Angmagssalik) on Ammassalik Island, not too far from the former United States Army Air Forces airfield Bluie East Two. The Danes raised objections to the Kulusuk site due to fear of undesirable fraternization with the inhabitants of a local Inuit village. The result was that the DYE-4 site there was placed off-limits to locals, although this policy failed resoundingly. Legally, the DYE-1 through -4 were annexes of the Sondrestrom joint Danish-American Defense Area under authority of the 1951 Greenland Bases Treaty. Unlike the case with the other United States bases in Greenland, Denmark took no interest in the DYE stations and, except for engineering operations, did not participate in their operation; and unlike other United States bases, they did not become a cause for domestic controversy.

Since the stations were built at high elevations, surveys indicated that during normal propagation conditions they should essentially close the gaps across Davis Strait and Denmark Strait, the latter with the aid of a later radar station at Ísafjörður at the northwestern corner of Iceland. Construction was influenced by mixed experience with two earlier ice cap radar stations near Thule Air Base, now Pituffik Space Base, (Site 1 and Site 2). The new design used pillars which would delay subsidence of the station into the ice. In this sense the stations were similar to the Texas Towers that had been built for air defense radars in coastal waters off the United States, except that the "tripod" was anchored in the ice, and the legs were eight massive steel beams. Periodic re-alignment of the station could be accomplished by adjustment of the beam attachments. At the inland stations, the nearly horizontally pointing tropospheric scatter (troposcatter) parabolic antennae had to be enclosed as part of the superstructure.

Snow accumulation of about 1 m (3 ft 3 in) per year caused subsidence which eventually necessitated a re-foundation. In 1977 and 1982, Danish Arctic Contractors carried out a delicate re-pillaring of the two ice cap stations through a “jacking-up” procedure that also laterally moved the station.

== Description ==
DYE stations

The DEW data center (call sign DYE, 66°40′N 61°21′W) at Cape Dyer on the eastern tip of Baffin Island was 1 of 4 "Canadian Main stations" (cf. PIN, CAM, FOX) and in January 1959, the station's manning switched to a Royal Canadian Air Force (RCAF) squadron leader being the "Officer-in-Charge" as "DEW Sector Commander", 1 of 5 RCAF officers at DYE (2 additional officers were USAF).

- DYE-1 (Qaqqatoqaq, Red River, 66°38′N 52°51′W, 4,789 ft [1,460 m]) was on a peak in an uninhabited area 27 mi (43 km) southeast of Sisimiut (Holsteinsborg) and 60 mi (97 km) southwest of Sondrestrom.
- DYE-2 (Ice Cap 1, Sea Bass, 66°29′N 46°18′W, 7,650 ft [2,330 m]) and DYE-3 were built using telescoping structures on top of the Greenland Ice Cap.
- DYE-3 (Ice Cap 2, (Sob Story, 65°11′N 43°50′W, 8,700 ft [2,700 m]) was established on the ice cap after errors in locating its construction camp required relocation.
- DYE-4 (Kulusuk Island, Big Gun, 65°32′N 37°10′W, 1,000 ft [300 m]) was at Kulusuk, formerly Cape Dan or Kap Dan, on the southern cape of Kulusuk Island at the former site of a United States World War II weather station.
- DYE-5 (Rockville Air Station, (64°02′N 22°39′W) was at Rockville Station near Keflavík, Iceland, where it connected to the North Atlantic Radio System.
- DYE-6 was the control center at Sondrestrom Air Base.

For closing dates and current status of the DIY-1 to DIY-5 sites, see the table of DEW Line sites not included in the North Warning System.

The stations were linked by tropospheric scatter and by high frequency (HF) radio, and all maintained radio watch on very high frequency (VHF) 126.2, ultra high frequency (UHF) 236.6, and HF 3023.5 (receive only); also on the aircraft emergency frequencies, 121.5 and 243.0. They also had radio beacons colocated; at one time tactical air navigation system (TACAN) stations. The minimally staffed stations radioed air traffic to fuse with other DEW Line tracks at NORAD at Peterson Space Force Base in Colorado Springs, Colorado and thus anchored the Greenland Distant Early Warning Identification Zone (DEWIZ) requiring positive identification of southbound tracks. The stations did not serve in civilian air traffic control, but their communications relay capabilities were of occasional utility to civilian air traffic.

=== Operation ===
The DEW Line was a drastic response to an urgently felt requirement for continental air defense, but when it was completed, the problem essentially evaporated – first, because ballistic missiles overtook the airbreathing threat by about 1960, and second, because overhead reconnaissance revealed that the size and capability of the Soviet Unions bomber force had been vastly overestimated. The three to six hours of warning that the Line might have provided thus became of little relevance. In addition, had the DYE stations warned of a raid, there would have been no means of interception or further tracking until landfall hours later; and they did not fully close the GIUK gap (Greenland-Iceland-United Kingdom).

== Legacy ==
During the resurgent tension of the 1980s, Canada and the United States (which jointly operate NORAD) decided to replace the obsolescent DEW Line with an update known as the North Warning System (NWS). However, by the late 1980s, the Soviet Union was collapsing and replacement of the again subsiding DYE stations was deemed not worth the expense. In connection with the turn-over of Sondrestrom to the Danish government in 1992, the DYE stations were abandoned and left to sink into the ice, an ongoing process. DYE 1-3 were evacuated in 1988, and DYE 4 in September 1991.

In addition to air defense radar tracks, Dye Stations provided thirty years of meteorological observations — the 2 ice cap sites (e.g., Dye 3) were used for ice core drilling.
