= Ikaasaartik Strait =

Coordinates: 65°34′10″N 37°03′00″W

Location within Greenland

Ikaasaartik Strait (old spelling: Ikâsârtik) is a strait in the Sermersooq municipality, on the southeastern coast of Greenland.

== Geography ==
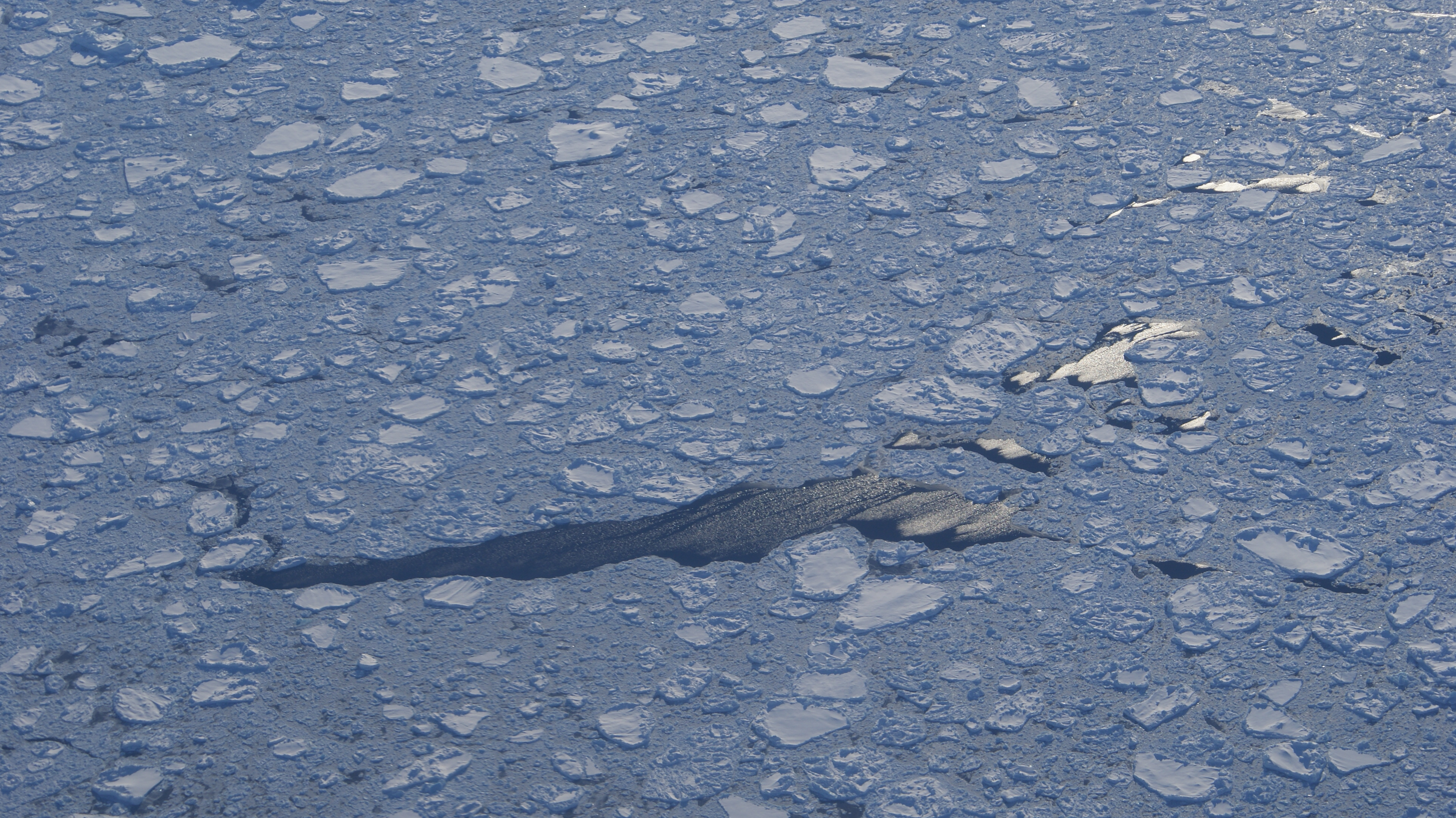
Leads and icefloes in the mouth of the strait, at the frozen confluence with the open North Atlantic.

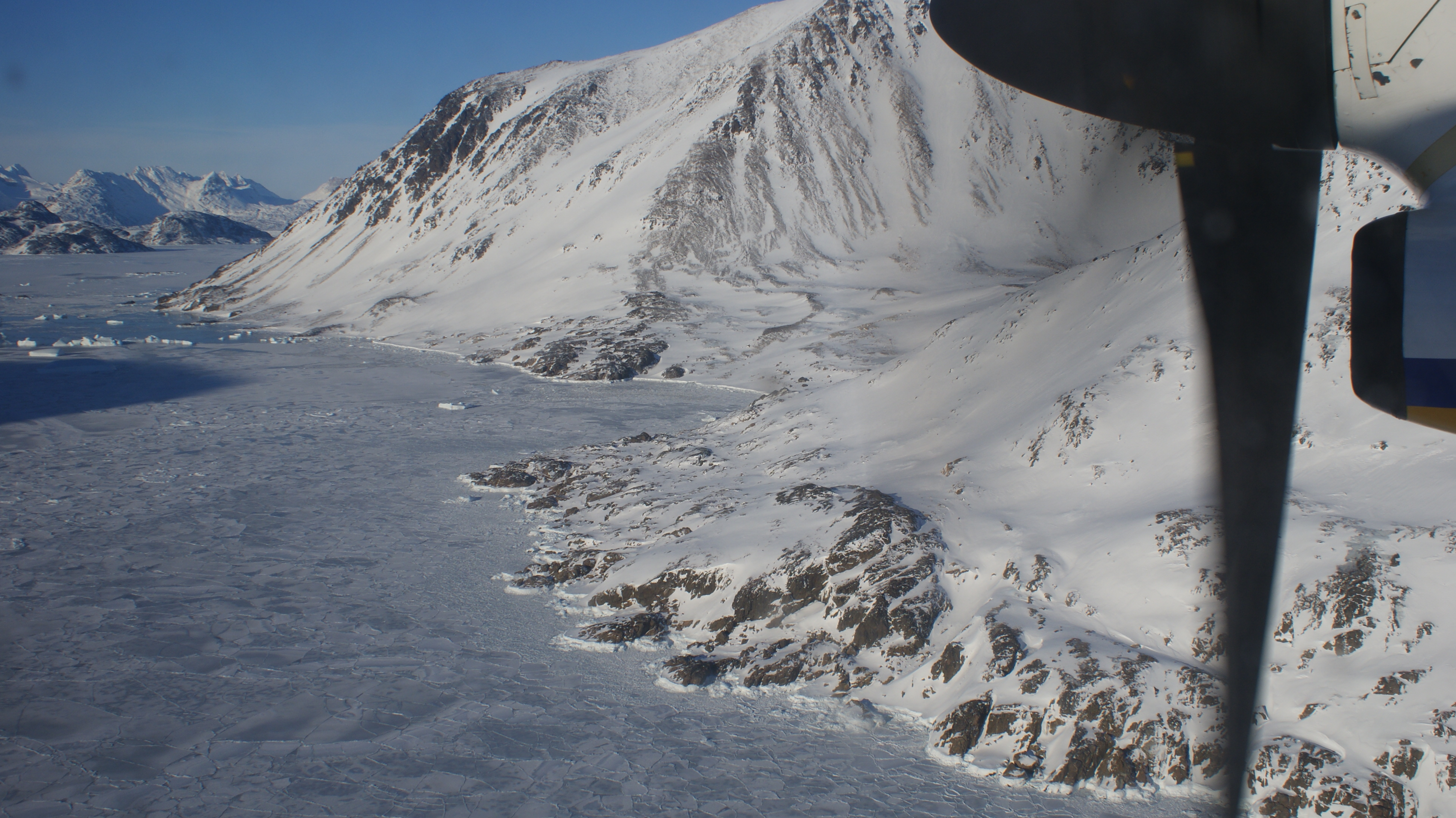
Aerial view of Ikaasaartik Strait

The strait separates Kulusuk Island in the southwest from Apusiaajik Island in the northeast. The strait waterway connects the Torsuut Tunoq sound in the northwest with the North Atlantic in the southeast.

Icelandair STOL aircraft approach Kulusuk Airport on the way from Nerlerit Inaat and Reykjavík flying directly over the southern end of Apusiaajik Island and then over the Ikaasaartik Strait, in an air canyon between the Qalorujoorneq ridge on Kulusuk Island, and the Kangaartik and Iperajivit summits on Apusiaajik Island.

During winter pack ice and small icebergs pushed forth by the East Greenland Current ram against the northeastern coast, blocking the narrow strait and facilitating the freeze of the much wider Torsuut Tunoq sound.
