= Kulusuk =

Kulusuk Kap Dan
- Settlement
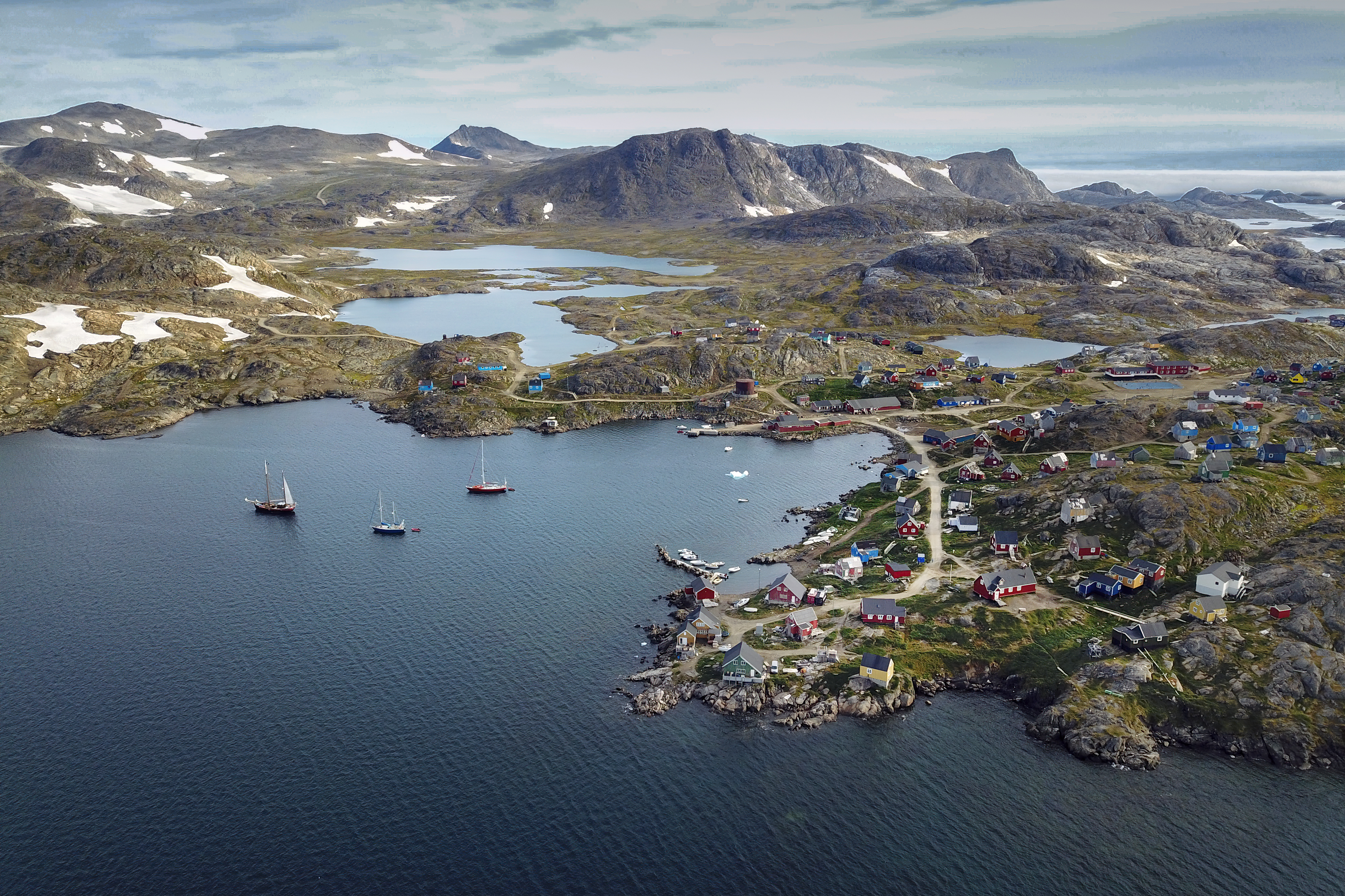
- Kulusuk

- Location within Greenland
- Coordinates: 65°34′31″N 37°11′00″W
- State: Kingdom of Denmark
- Constituent country: Greenland
- Municipality: Sermersooq
- Founded: 1909

Government
  - Mayor: Pele Maratse

Population (2020)
  - Total: 241
- Time zone: UTC−02:00 (WGT)
  - Summer (DST): UTC−01:00 (WGST)
- Postal code: 3915

Kulusuk (old spelling: Qulusuk), formerly Kap Dan, is a settlement in the Sermersooq municipality in southeastern Greenland, located on an island of the same name. The settlement has a population of 241, including many Danes choosing to live there due to the airport. In the Kalaallisut language, the name of the village means "Chest of a Black Guillemot".

== Geography ==
The urbanized area of the settlement is centered around the harbour in the northwestern part of the island, on the shores of the Torsuut Tunoq sound. Industrial utility buildings are also scattered in the vicinity of the airport, to the northwest of the runway.

=== Kulusuk Island ===
The island measures 8 km (5.0 mi) from north to south and 11 km (6.8 mi) from west to east. It is hilly throughout, with several distinct mountains dominating the eastern and southern coast. The southernmost point is Cape Naujaangivit, formerly Cape Dan (Danish: Kap Dan, a name previously extended to the settlement and island) under the Isikajia mountain.

=== Qalorujoorneq ===
The highest point on the island is the summit of Qalorujoorneq, at 676 m (2,217.8 ft) topping a wide mountain massif in the southeast, directly above the airport.

== History ==
=== From prehistory until 15th century ===
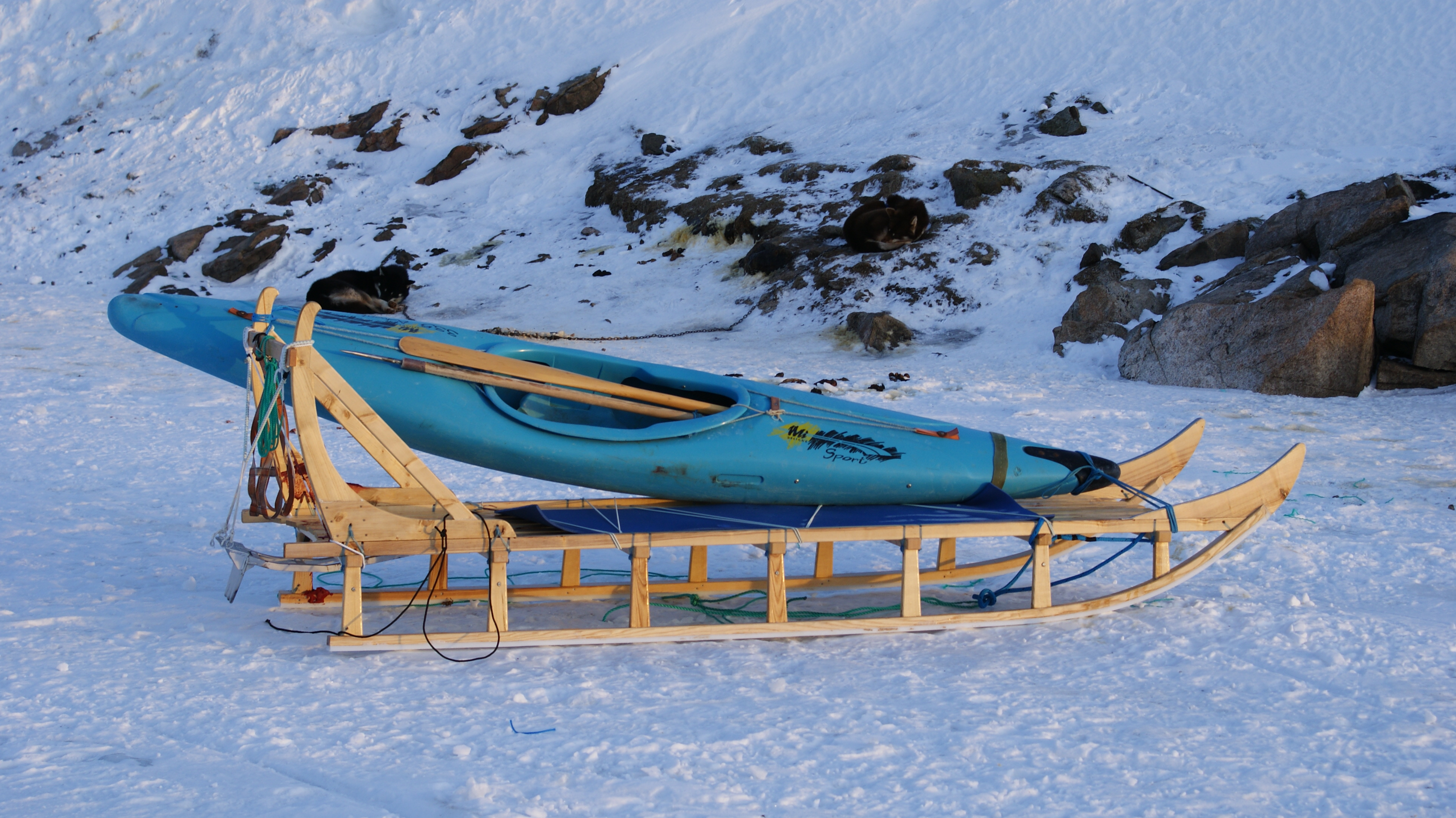
A Greenlandic kayak atop a dogsled

The Saqqaq people were the first to reach eastern Greenland, arriving from the north through what is now known as Peary Land and Independence Fjord. They were displaced by the Dorset culture around 3,000 years ago. The Thule people passed through the area in the 15th century, finding the southeastern coast uninhabited.

=== 18th and 19th centuries ===
Due to back-migrations to the more densely populated western coast, the southeastern coast was deserted for another two hundred years. The region was not settled until the late 18th century, with the current town of Tasiilaq – then known as Ammassalik – surviving as the only permanent settlement in the 19th century. Population increased however from the 1880s, dispersing over several villages in the area.

=== 20th century ===
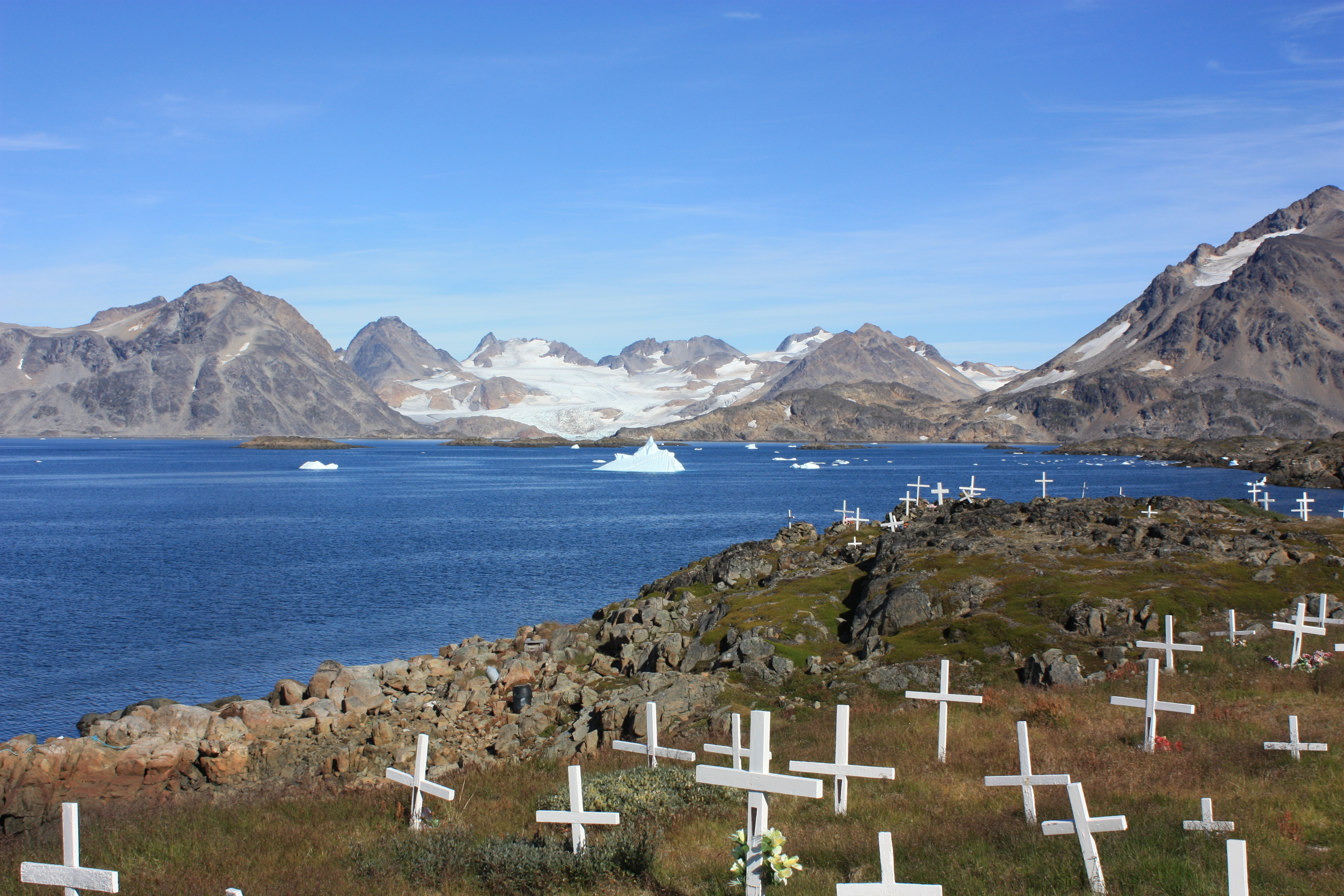
The village cemetery

The small Kulusuk Island was not permanently settled until the early 1900s, with the village founded only in 1909, celebrating its 100th anniversary in 2009. The church in the village was constructed in 1908 by the crew of a Danish sailing vessel that ran aground on the nearby coast and constructed from the timbers of the ship itself. A model of the ship still hangs above the organ of the church, rebuilt and brought into its present state in 1922.

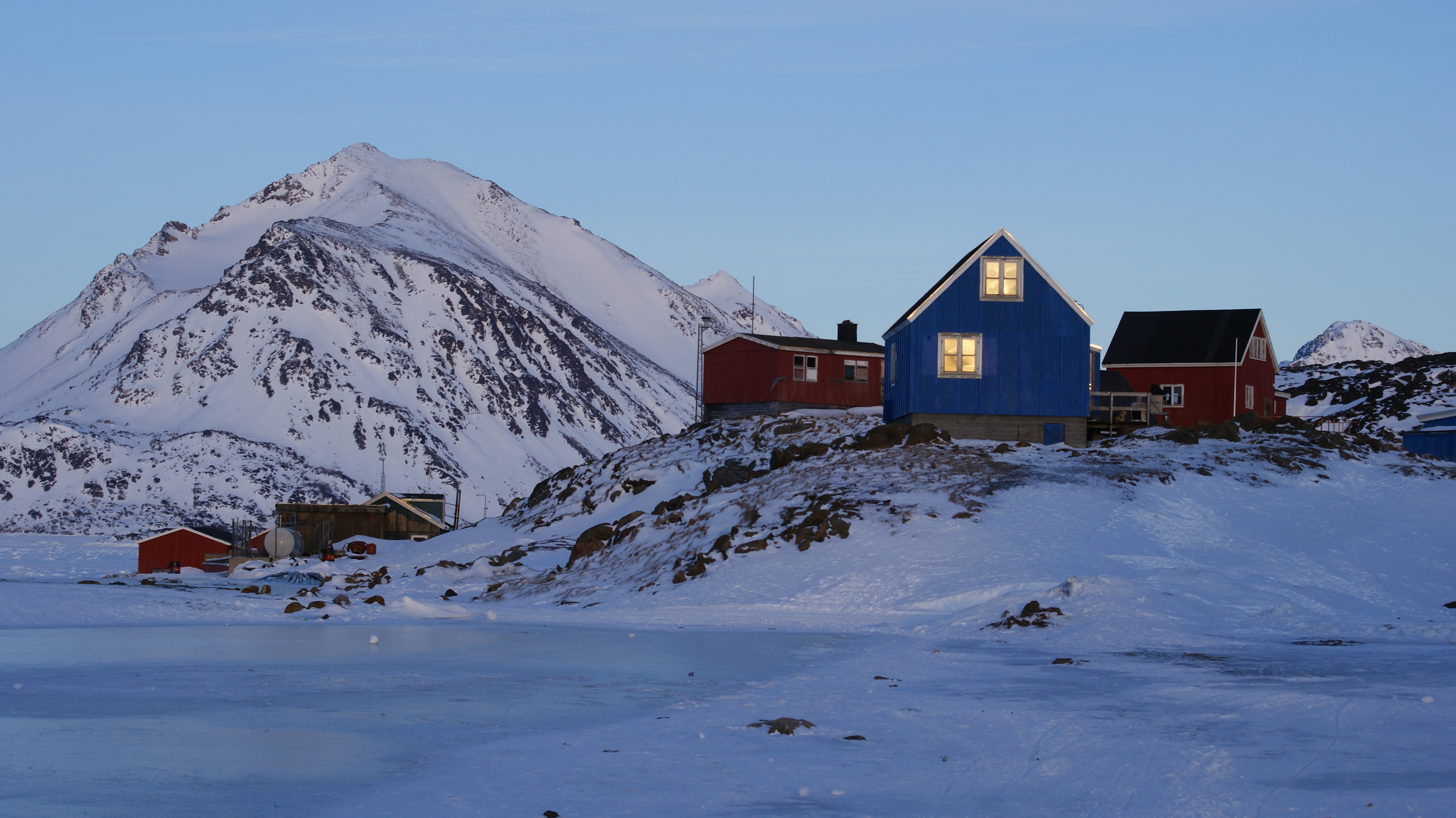
Western part of the village: the winter sunset light reflected in the window glass

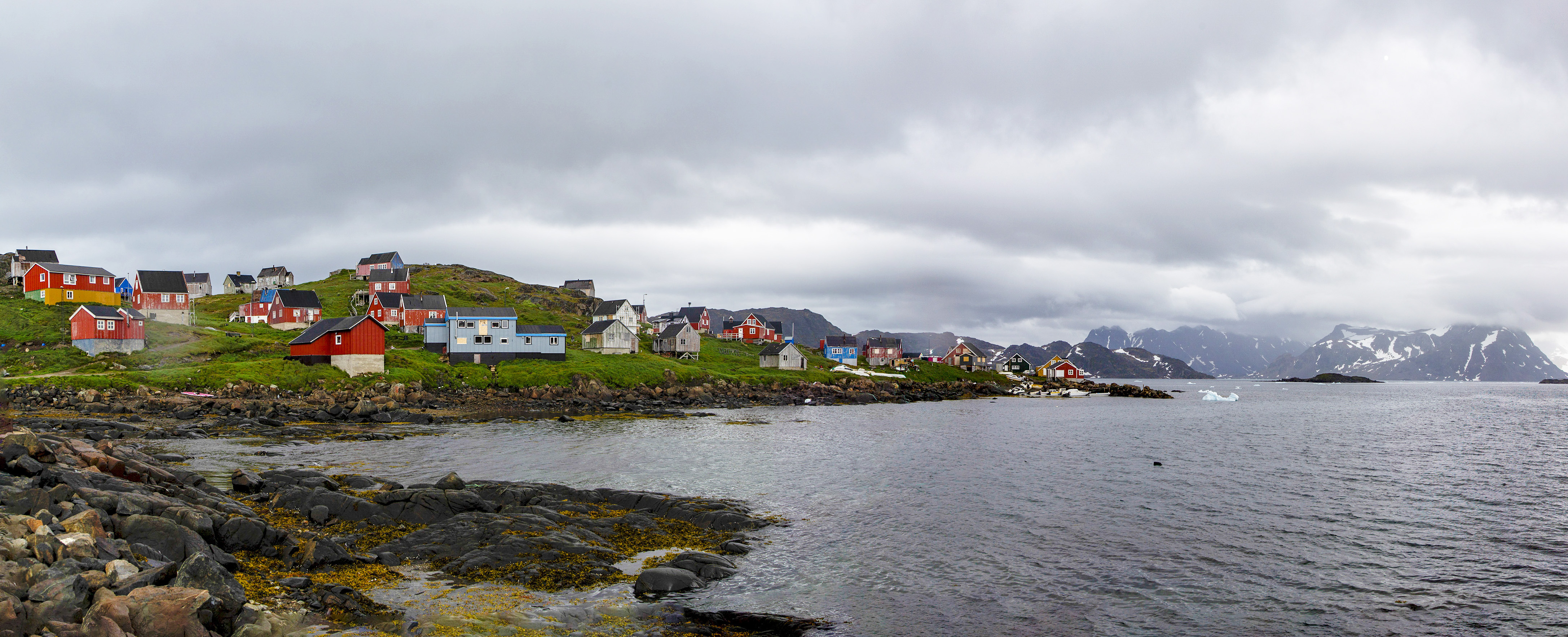
The village during August 2018

The village cemetery is located about 200 m (656.2 ft) southeast of the village center, on permafrost ground, straddling the southern and northern slopes of a small hill. No names appear on the crosses in honour of the Inuit tradition that the name of the deceased is passed on to another at death and lives on to the next generation.

In the 1930s, the population reached 165 inhabitants, the village surpassing the older Tasiilaq as the largest settlement in the region. As of 2013, Kulusuk is the third-largest settlement in the region, after Tasiilaq and Kuummiit, and the fourth-largest on the eastern coast, although the number of villagers dipped below 300 in the late 2000s.

Kulusuk Airport was built by the U.S. military in 1956, in order to support the DYE-4 station, part of the Distant Early Warning Line, a radar monitoring station located on the south tip of Kulusuk Island, linked by an 8 km (5 mi) road. The U.S. departed the site and airport in 1991. A new terminal was opened at Kulusuk Airport in December 1994.

In 1959, Icelandair began operating day trips during the summer to Kulusuk from Reykjavík Airport arriving in the morning and departing in the evening. This created an influx of day-tripping tourists and a small tourism industry was created in Kulusuk. The Hotel Kulusuk was opened in 1998. Icelandair ceased offering day trips in 2019, but continues to serve the airport with a more conventional flight schedule.

== Language ==
Due to its relative and longstanding isolation, the dialect of Greenlandic spoken in Kulusuk, Tunumiit oraasiat, differs from that of its relatives of the western coast. Amongst Greenlandic dialects, it is considered the most innovative.

== Facilities ==
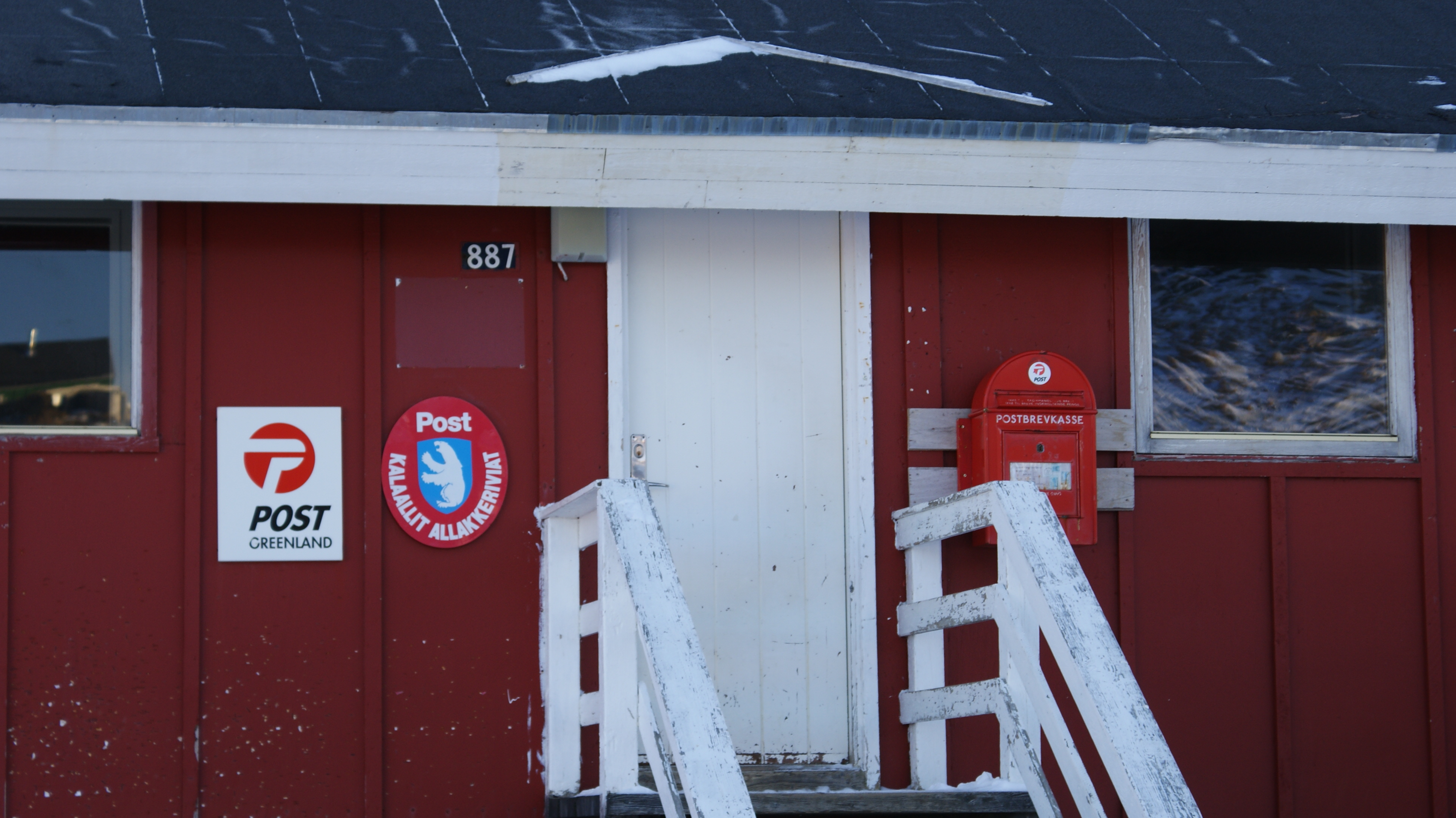
Kalaallit alakkeriviat, the post office of Post Greenland

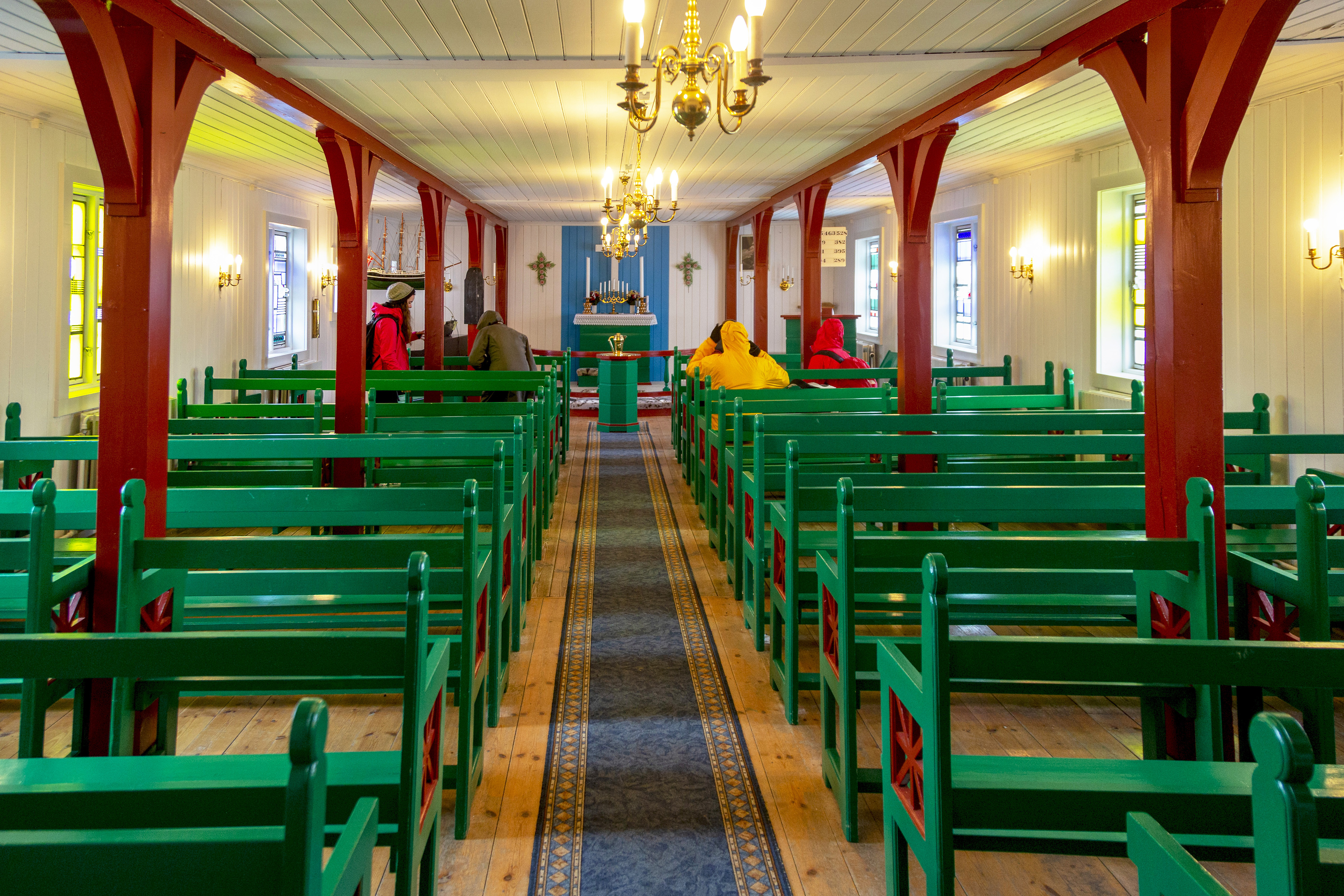
The interior of the Lutheran church in Kulusuk, Greenland. Stained glass windows are visible on the sides.

Medical services are provided by one resident Danish nurse and one resident educated local helper. The school, which was rebuilt in 2005, has about 70 pupils with a high proportion of educated teachers. In 2009 the village received permission from the Sermersooq municipal authorities to convert the old Royal Greenland fish processing plant for school use.

Few families have access to running water. Despite the harsh, icy winter, potable water drawn from the centrally located lake is available all year round through the central pump installation. As in most settlements in Greenland, pipe waterworks are led above the ground due to permafrost.

The village is served by the communal all-purpose Pilersuisoq store with an integrated a post office of Post Greenland.

The village has a small Lutheran church, which includes elegant stained glass windows donated by a German glassworks owner.

== Tourism ==
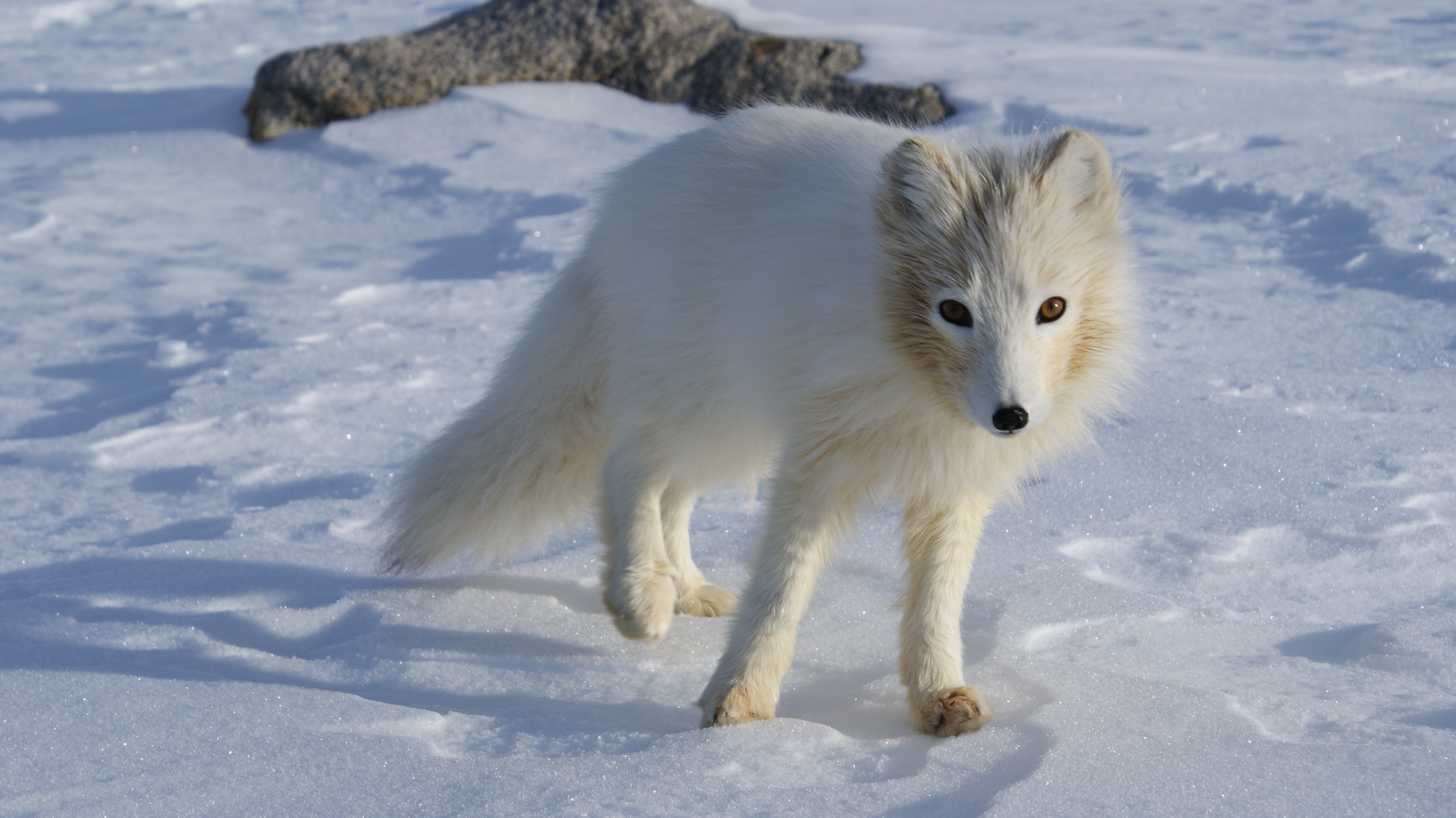
A curious Arctic fox, the permanent inhabitant of the island

Unemployment is high and many of the villagers depend upon tourism to supplement the more traditional pursuits of hunting and fishing. The village is served by Hotel Kulusuk which was opened in 1998 and provides a base for tourists and hikers. Trips organized by the hotel and Icelandair focus on the traditional culture of eastern Greenland, including drum dance performances and dogsledding.

In summer, activities as glacier walks, ice climbing and visiting ice caves can be done with the help of local adventure companies.

In winter it is possible to cross the frozen sounds, making Kulusuk no less attractive for mountaineers, climbers, and polar adventurers than the neighboring Tasiilaq. The mountains on Apusiaajik Island dominating the Kulusuk panorama culminate in several summits, whilst the front of the active Apusiaajik glacier can be reached on foot or by snowmobile.

Polar cruises bound for, or returning from the coastal voyages in the Kangertittivaq fjord and the shores of Northeast Greenland National Park often visit the area on their way from/to Tasiilaq, albeit without anchoring in the harbour due to the shallowness of the coastal waters.

== Population ==
The population of Kulusuk has decreased by 23% relative to the 1990 levels, and by over 19% relative to the 2000 levels.

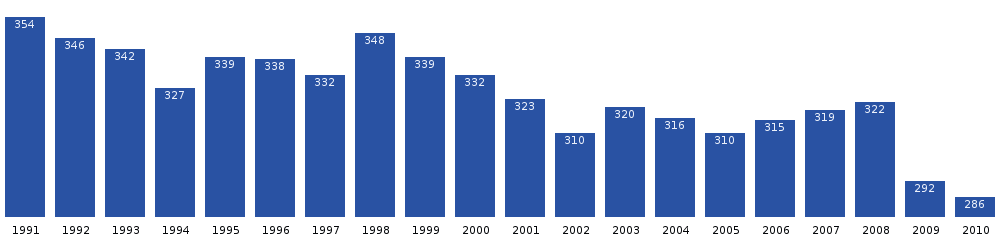
Kulusuk population growth dynamics, 1991-2010. Source: Statistics Greenland

== Transport ==
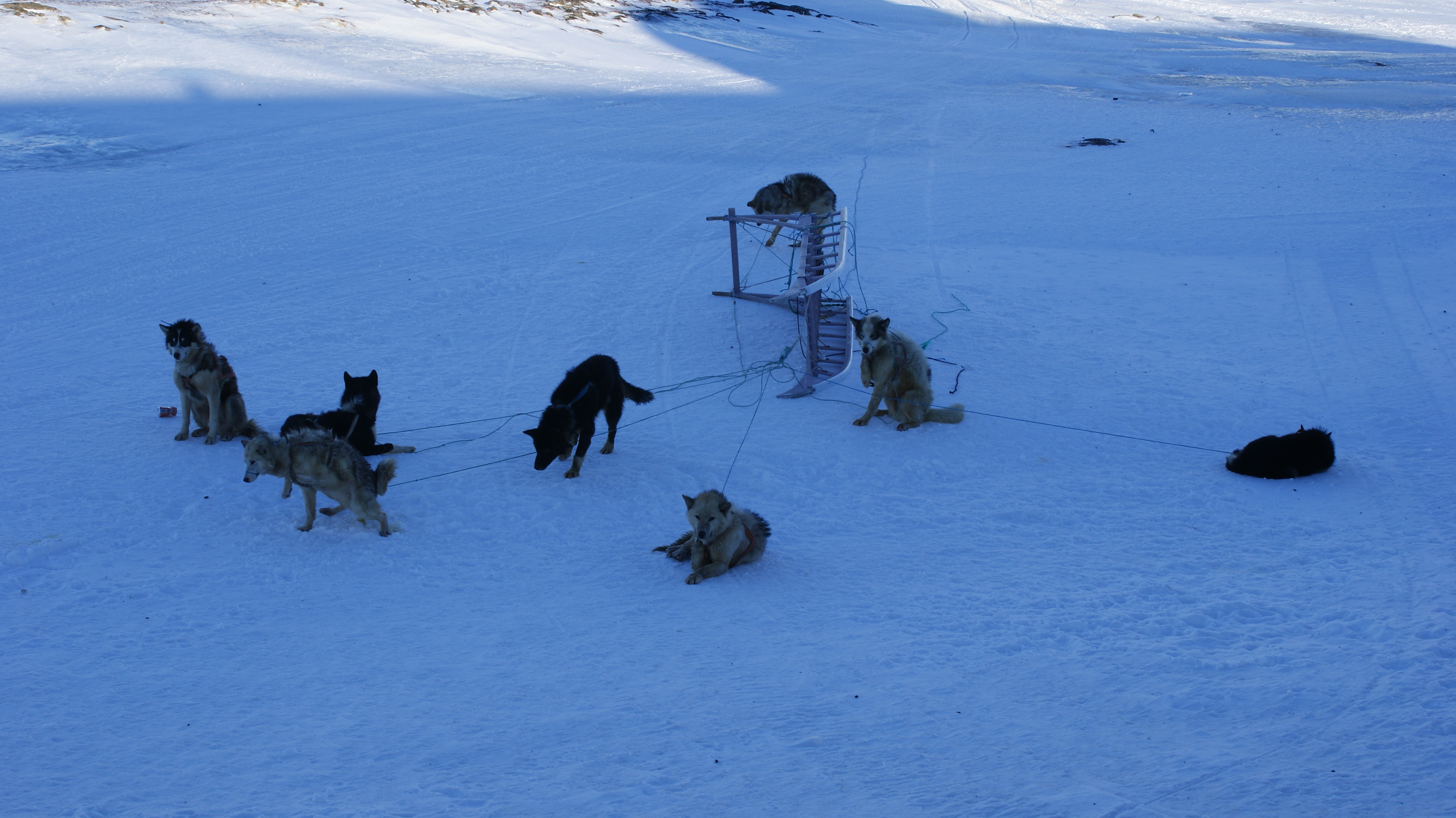
If protected in traditional ways, the sled can be left alone with the dogs

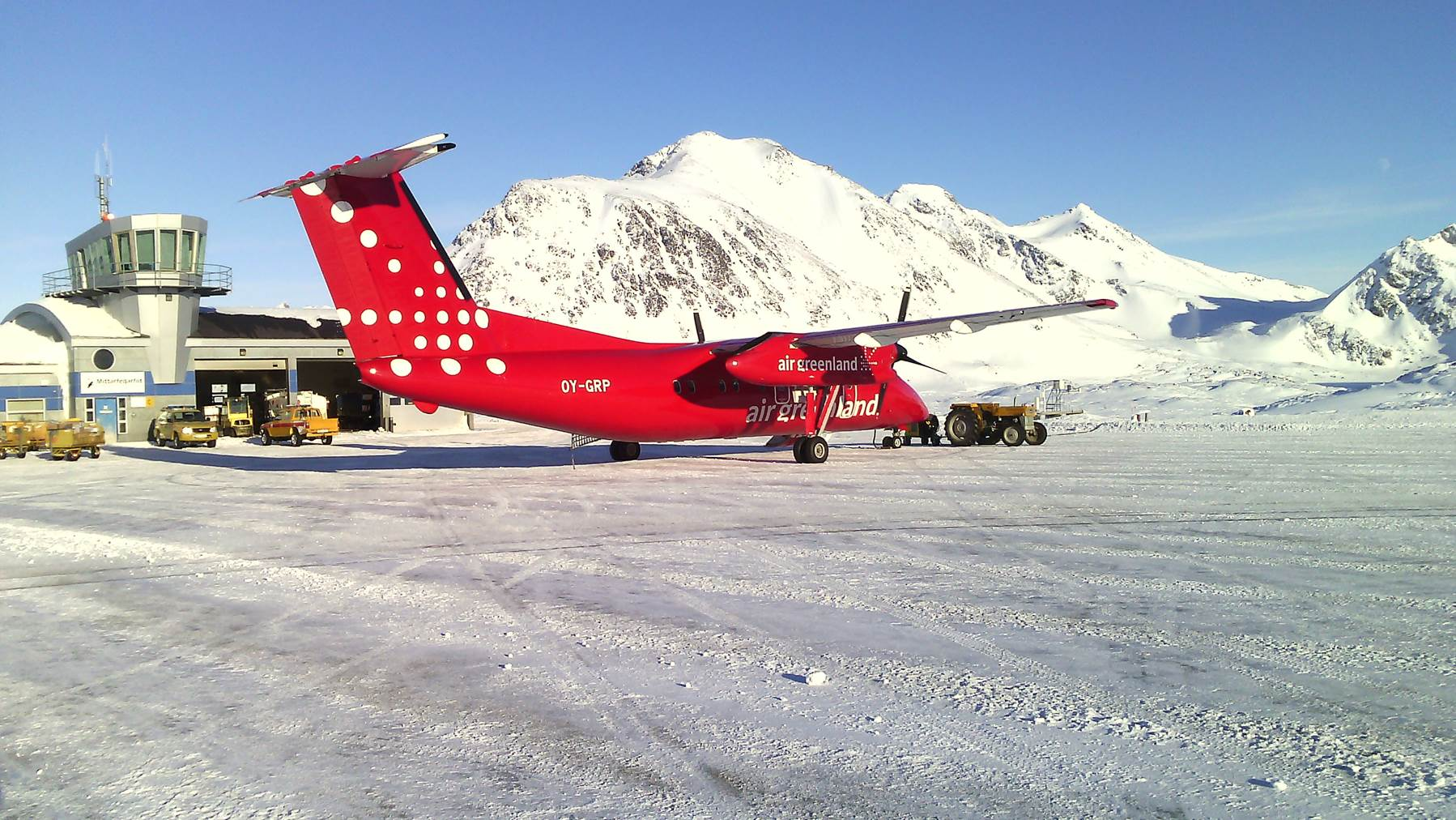
De Havilland Canada Dash 8-200 of Air Greenland at Kulusuk Airport. The route to Nuuk is the only domestic route in the country that crosses the ice sheet, linking the western and eastern coasts of Greenland.

The village is served by Kulusuk Airport, one of two international airports in eastern Greenland. It provides direct connections to Nuuk on the western coast, Reykjavík-Keflavík in Iceland, and Tasiilaq on Ammassalik Island, which links many other villages in the region through settlement helicopter flights. Air Greenland and Icelandair operate at the airport.

In the summer, the cargo boats of Royal Arctic Line connect Kulusuk and Tasiilaq, providing an ad hoc alternative for the helicopter flights of Air Greenland.

In the winter, the inhabitants of the village use snowmobiles and traditional dogsleds as additional means of transport – families arriving at the airport are ferried to the settlement on both. Dogsleds are then left briefly untended, albeit accidental escapes amongst the dogs are rendered impossible through overturning the sled, and binding of the front paws of the dog pack leaders.

== Climate ==
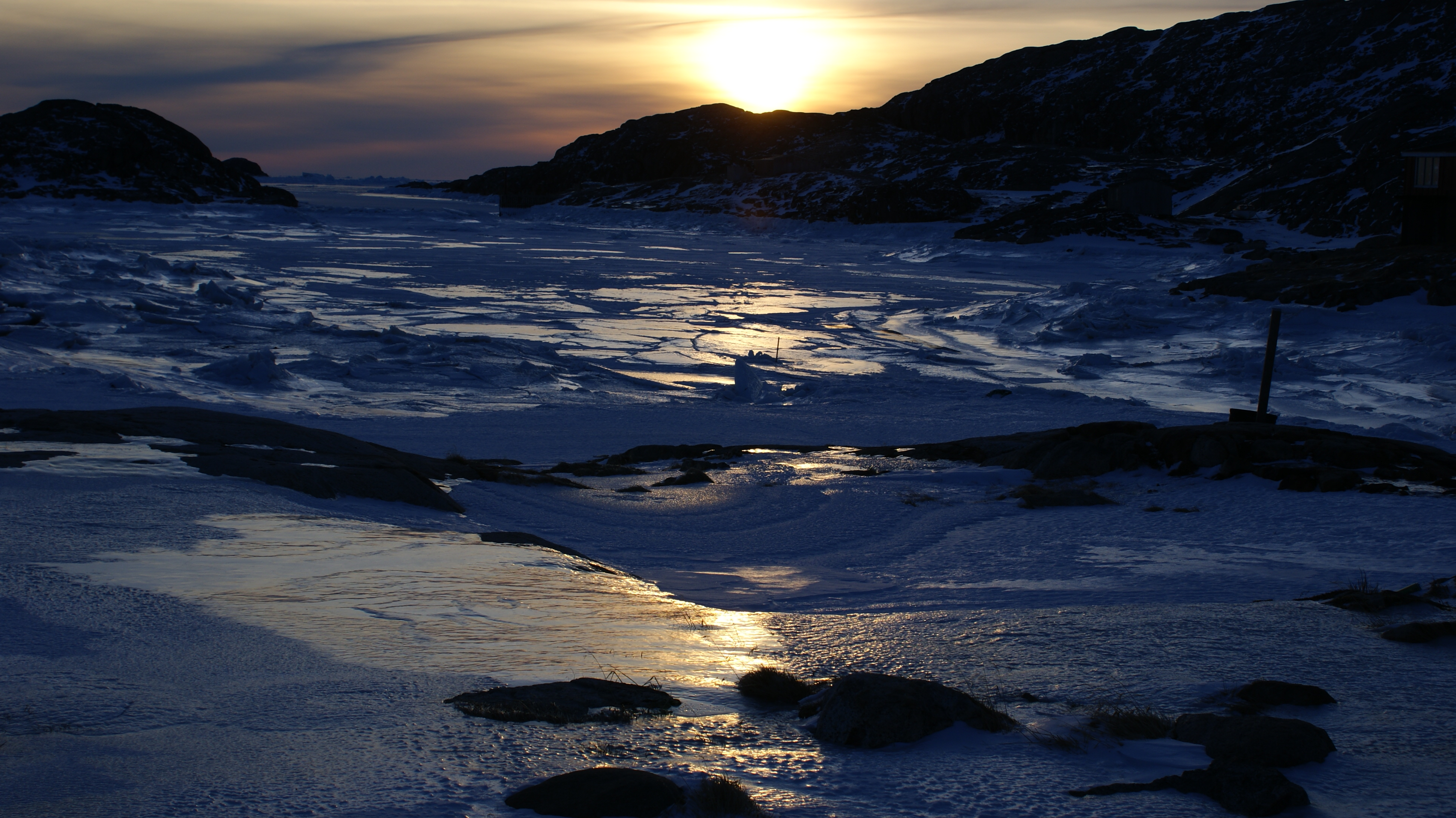
Open-air bivouac in winter in the icebound bay of Tiivtingaleq. The February ice is hard enough to require that the hooks of a polar mummy sleeping bag be fastened to the ice with a screw

As an outlying island in the small archipelago of islands in the Ammassalik region, Kulusuk Island is the most exposed to the persistent northeasterly winds from the Greenland Sea. Although the average winter temperatures are higher than in the more northerly settlements on the west coast of Greenland – often in single digits below zero – the ferocity of winds brings the effective temperatures down by more than an order of magnitude. During a quarter or more January days the island experiences wind speeds between 8 and 10 on the Beaufort scale, qualifying as fresh gales, strong gales, or storms.

Wind speeds exceeding 100 km/h occur throughout the year, often causing flight cancellations at the Kulusuk Airport. Neighboring Tasiilaq – where the main local weather station is located – holds the settlement windspeed record for Greenland: on 7 February 1970 the speed peaked at 54 m/s or 194 km/h.

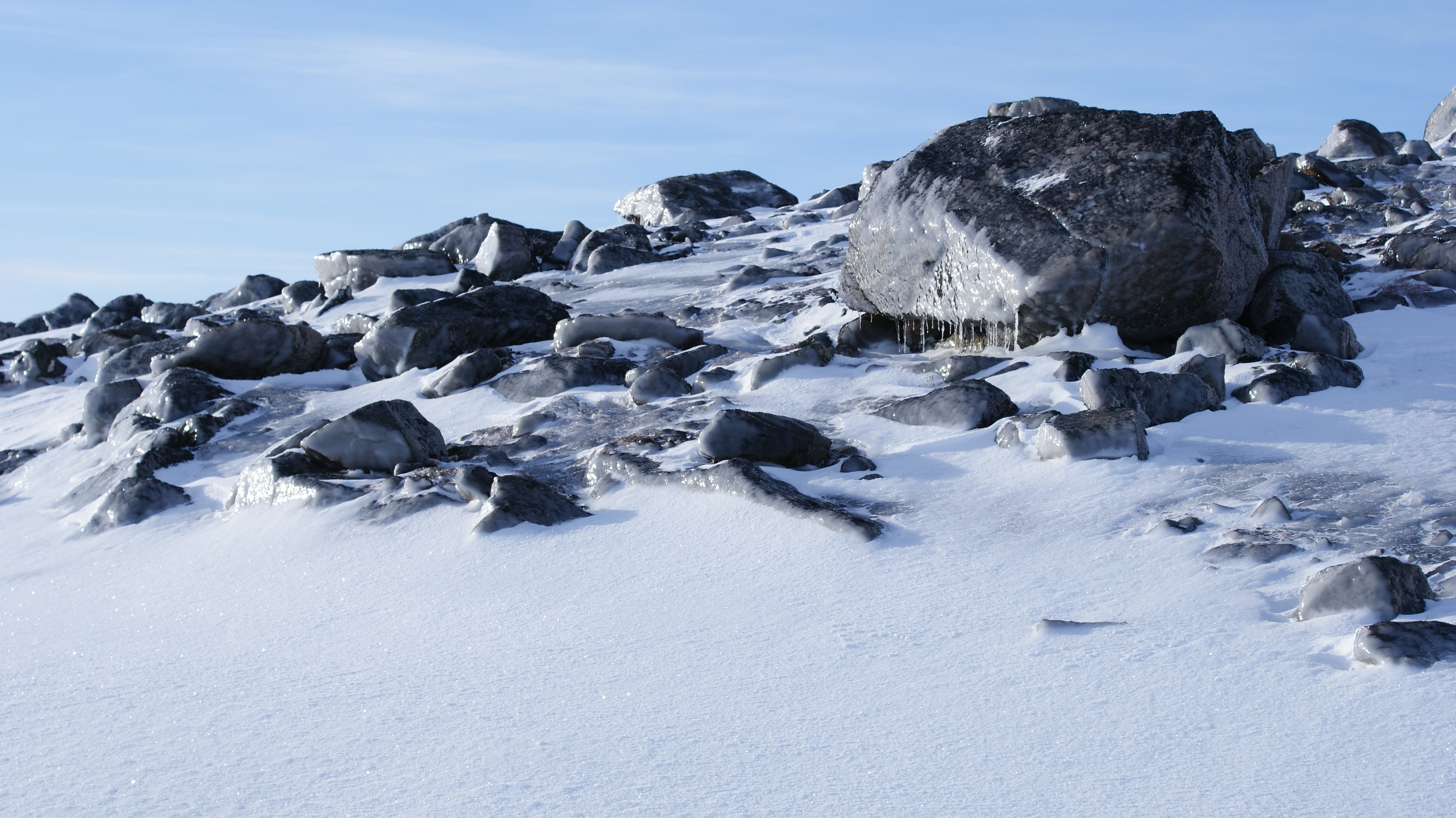
Moraine boulders under Qalorujoorneq: rime ice windblasted on the northeast-facing surfaces

Pack ice and small icebergs pushed forth by the East Greenland Current ram against the northeastern coast, blocking the Ikaasaartik Sound and facilitating the freeze of the wider Torsuut Tunoq waterway.

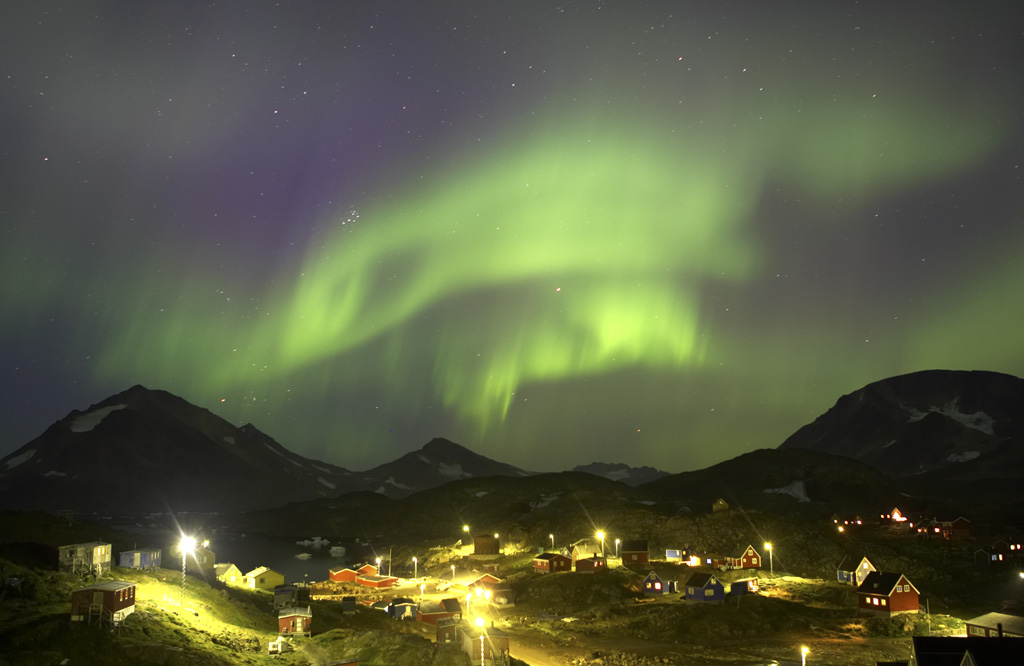
Aurora borealis over Kulusuk

Conversely, when the Greenland High pressure area from the Greenland ice sheet (Greenlandic: Sermersuaq) moves towards the area in winter, Kulusuk can be as wind-free and sunny as the inner parts of the Uummannaq Fjord region known as the sunniest spot in Greenland.

Kulusuk experiences one of the windiest winters, with rougher weather than the rest of Greenland. A particular feature of the local climate is the instantly freezing rain, covering the northeast-facing surfaces with layers of rime ice. There is little snow in winter, with the island remaining icebound for several months, the ice forms varying from solid firn, through glazed surfaces, to rime ice.

Even though Kulusuk lies approximately 110 km (68.4 mi) south of the Arctic Circle, the celestial phenomenon of Aurora borealis can still be observed in the village.
