= Apusiaajik Island =

Island in Greenland

Apusiaajik
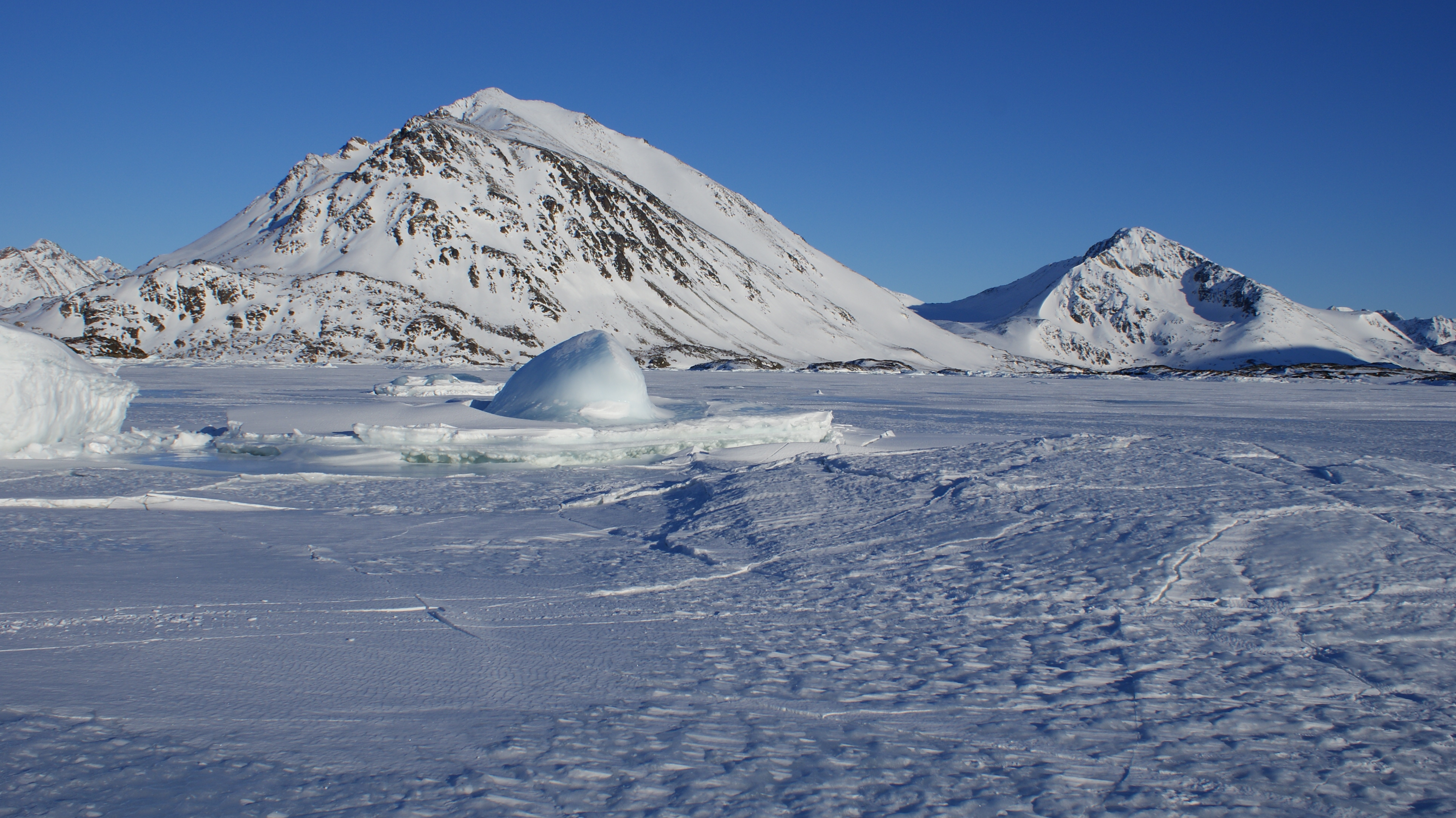
- Apusiaajik island seen from the frozen Torsuut Tunoq sound northeast of Kulusuk
- Interactive map of Apusiaajik

Geography
- Location: North Atlantic
- Coordinates: 65°39′00″N 37°03′00″W
- Area: 114 km^{2} (44 sq mi)

Administration
- Greenland
- Municipality: Sermersooq

Apusiaajik Island (old spelling: Apusiâjik) is an uninhabited island in the Sermersooq municipality on the southeastern shore of Greenland. It is an outlying island in the Ammassalik archipelago of islands on the coast of the North Atlantic.

Icelandair STOL aircraft approach Kulusuk Airport on the way from Nerlerit Inaat and Reykjavík flying directly over the southern end of the island.

== Geography ==
Apusiaajik island is separated from the Kulusuk Island in the south by the Ikaasaartik Strait; from the small Akinaaq island and tiny skerries in the southwest by the Torsuut Tunoq sound; from Ammassalik Island in the northwest by the Ammassalik Fjord; from Erqiliqaarteq island in the east and from the Ingiingaleq island in the southeast by the Aqartertuluk sound.

The island is very mountainous, with several distinct peaks and mountain ranges. The highest summit is Qivtaatit in the north, at 855 m (2,805.1 ft). The central part of the island is glaciated, with the active Apusiaajik Glacier flowing towards Torsuut Tunoq sound.

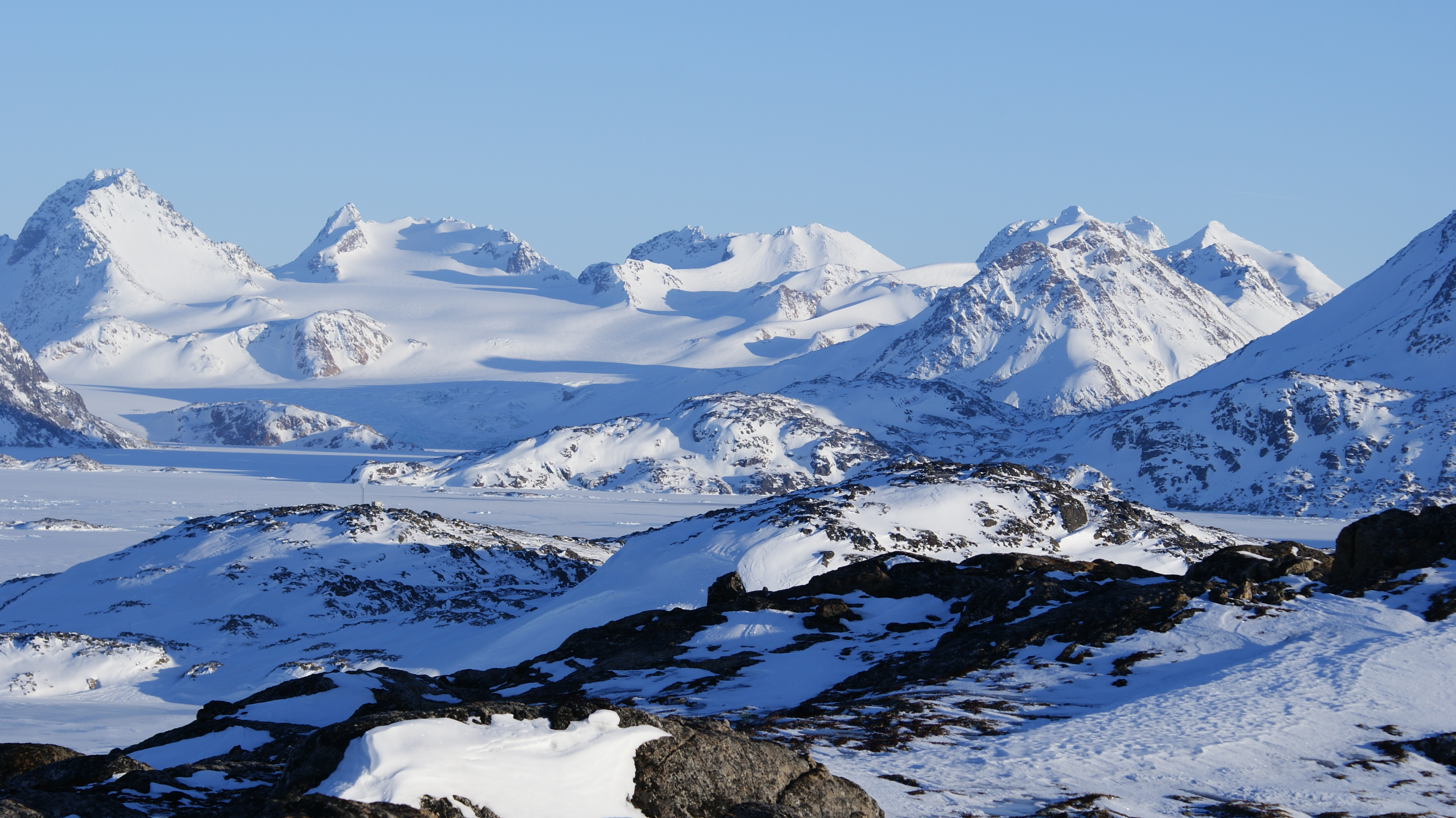
Apusiaajik glacier

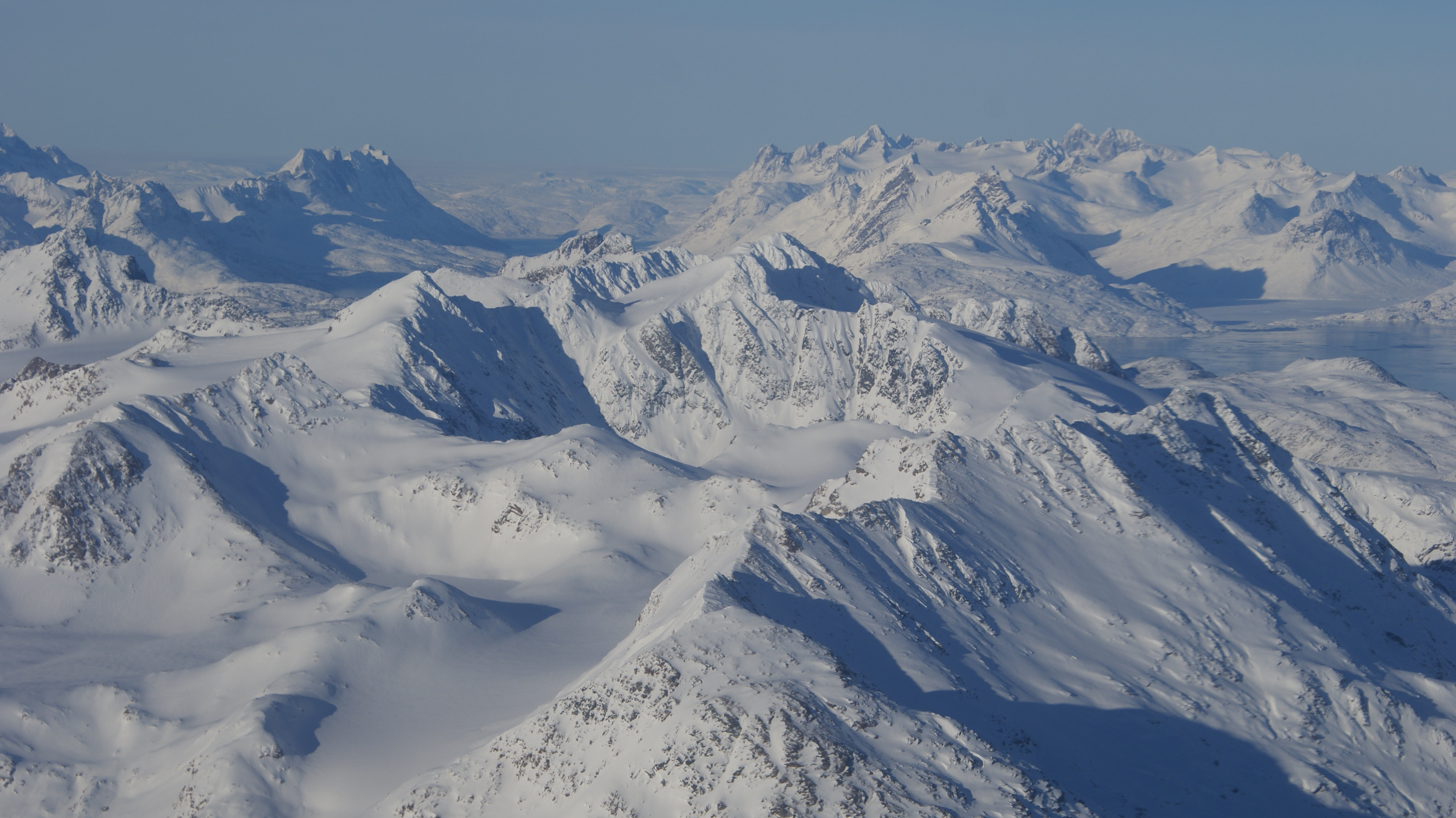
Aerial view

== Tourism ==
Polar cruises bound for, or returning from the coastal voyages in the Kangertittivaq fjord and the shores of Northeast Greenland National Park often visit the area on their way from/to Tasiilaq. During summer, the glacier edge is also a popular tourist destination for boat trips from Tasiilaq and Kulusuk, In winter it is possible to cross the frozen sounds on foot or on snowmobile, Several summits on the island attract mountaineers, climbers, and polar adventurers, much as the neighboring Ammassalik island.

== See also ==
- List of islands of Greenland
