= Torsuut Tunoq =

Coordinates: 65°36′00″N 37°10′30″W

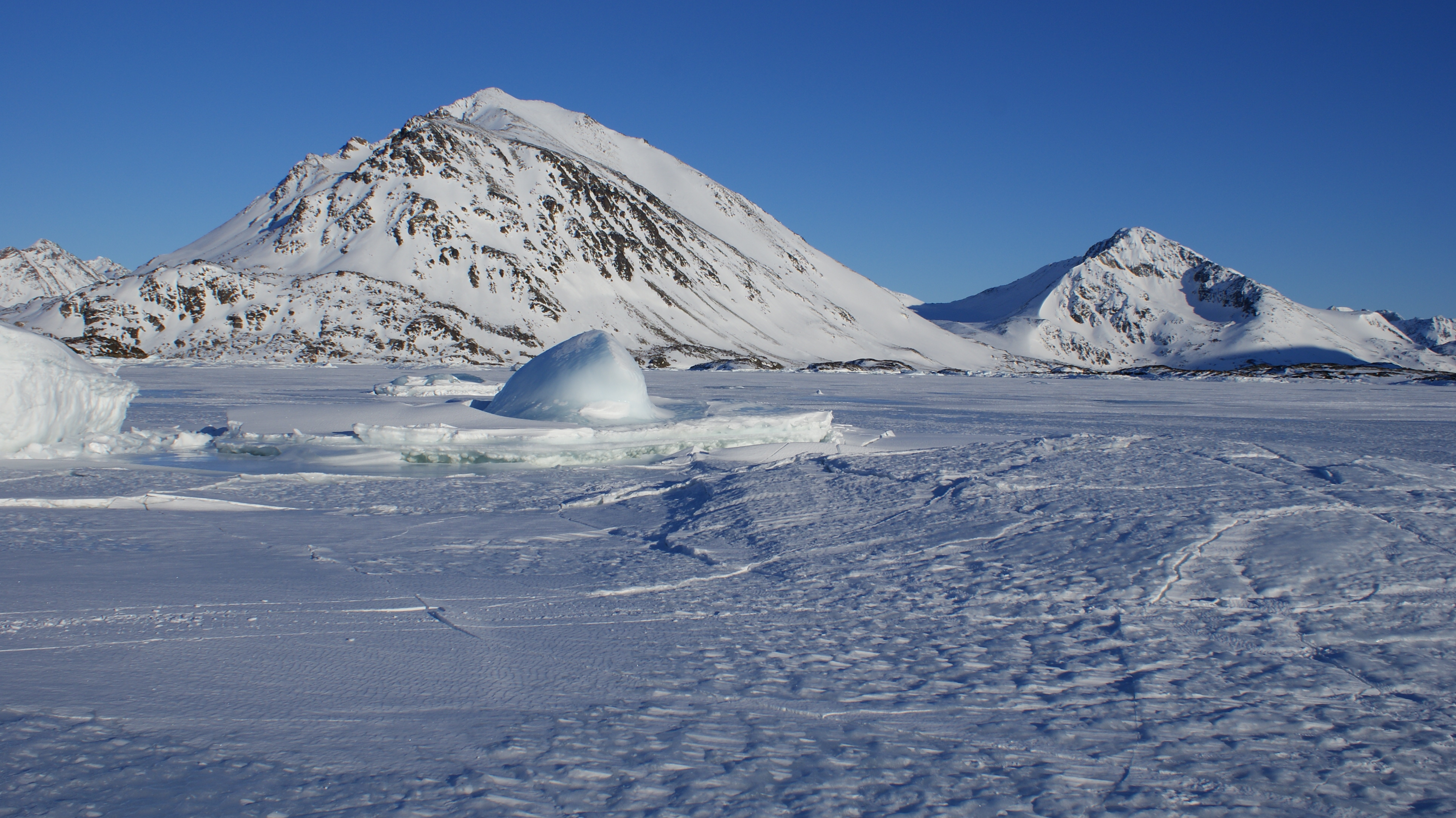
The sound is frozen solid during winter

Torsuut Tunoq (old spelling: Torssuut Tunoq) is a sound on the southeastern coast of Greenland. It is an inner waterway of the North Atlantic.

== Geography ==
The sound separates Kulusuk Island in the south from Apusiaajik Island in the northeast, and from the small Akinaaq island and smaller skerries in the northwest. The strait waterway connects Ammassalik Fjord in the northwest with the North Atlantic in the southeast, through the Ikaasaartik Strait.

During winter pack ice and small icebergs pushed forth by the East Greenland Current ram against the northeastern coast, blocking the narrow Ikaasaartik Strait and facilitating the freeze of the much wider Torsuut Tunoq sound. The tidewater Apusiaajik Glacier drains into the sound in its northernmost part.

== Settlement ==
Kulusuk is the only settlement in the area, located on an island of the same name on the southern coast of the sound.

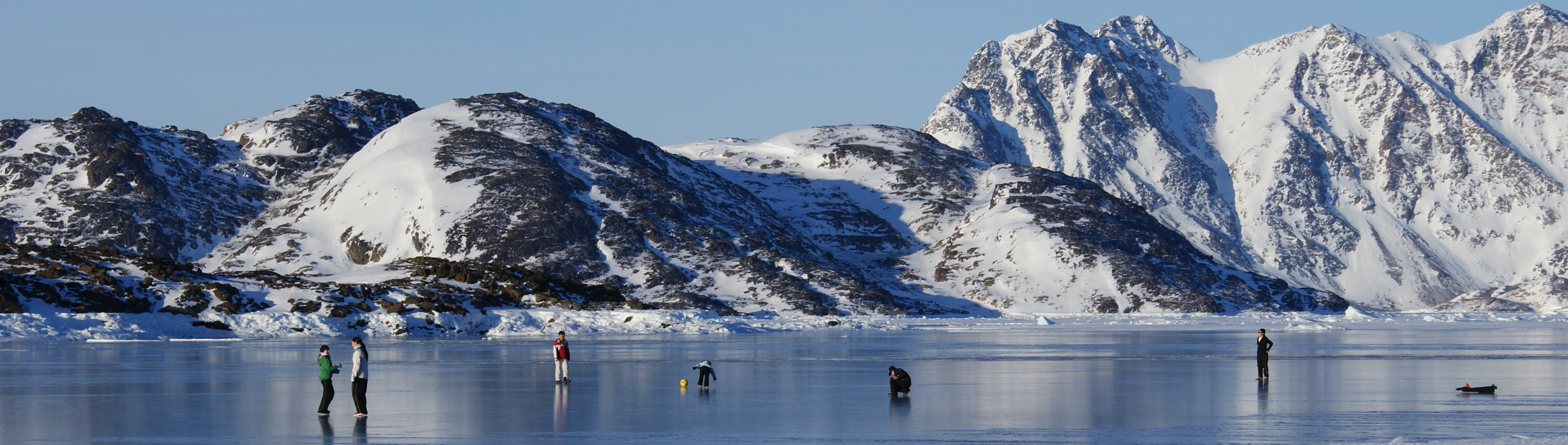
Saturday in winter: the children of Kulusuk play ball on the ice, several hundred meters offshore on the surface of the frozen Torsuut Tunoq sound

== Transport ==
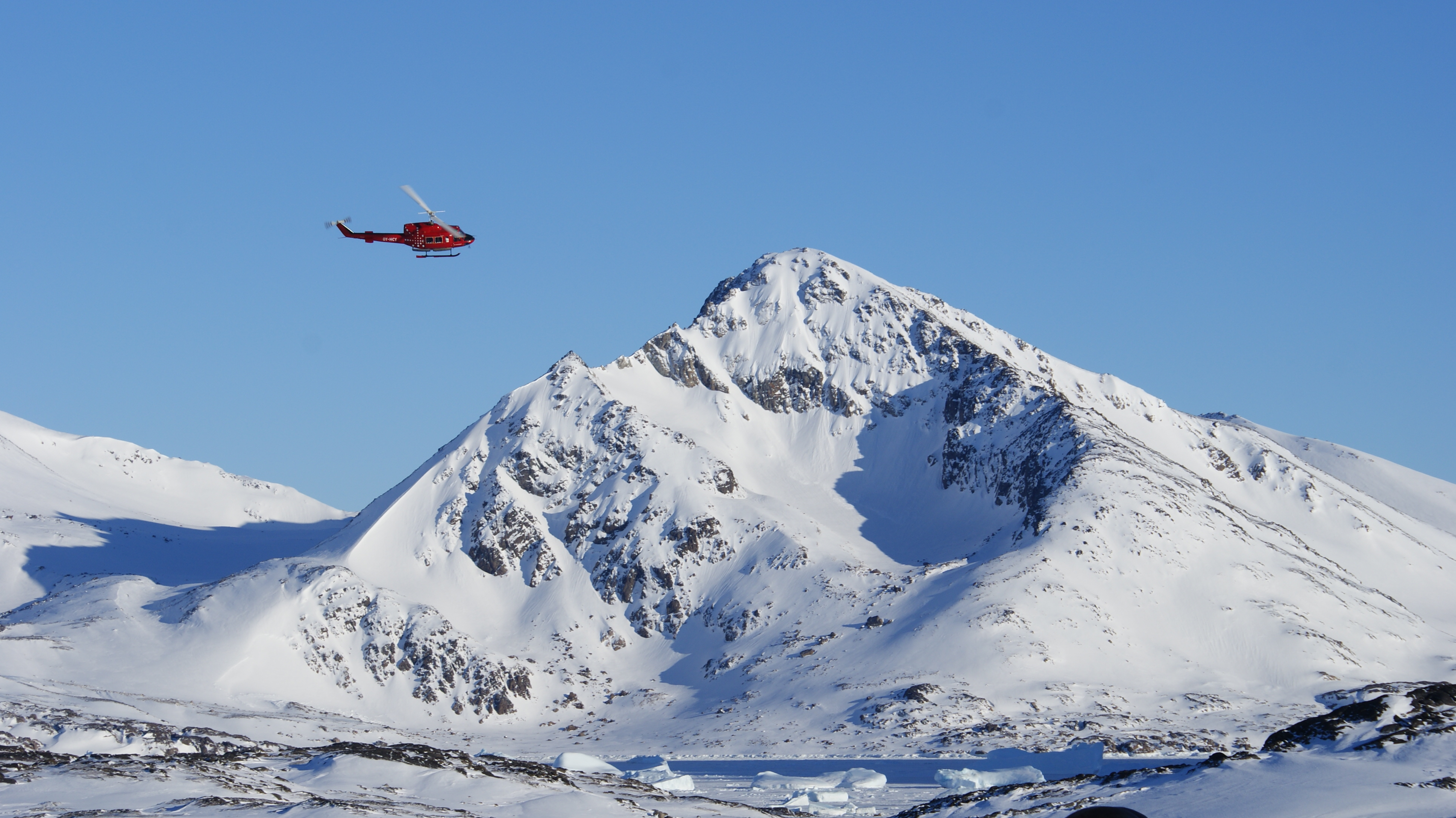
Air Greenland Bell 212 helicopter route from Kulusuk Airport to Tasiilaq Heliport passes over the sound

The inhabitants of Kulusuk use snowmobiles and traditional dogsleds as additional means of transport during wintertime−families arriving at the Kulusuk Airport are ferried to the settlement on both, using the frozen waterway.

In the summer, the cargo boats of Royal Arctic Line connect Kulusuk and Tasiilaq, providing an ad hoc alternative for the helicopter flights of Air Greenland. Polar cruises bound for, or returning from the coastal voyages in the Kangertittivaq fjord and the shores of Northeast Greenland National Park often visit the area on their way from/to Tasiilaq, albeit without anchoring in the harbour due to the shallowness of the coastal waters in the sound.
