= Ammassalik Island =

Island in Greenland

Ammassalik
Native name: Kong Oscars Ø
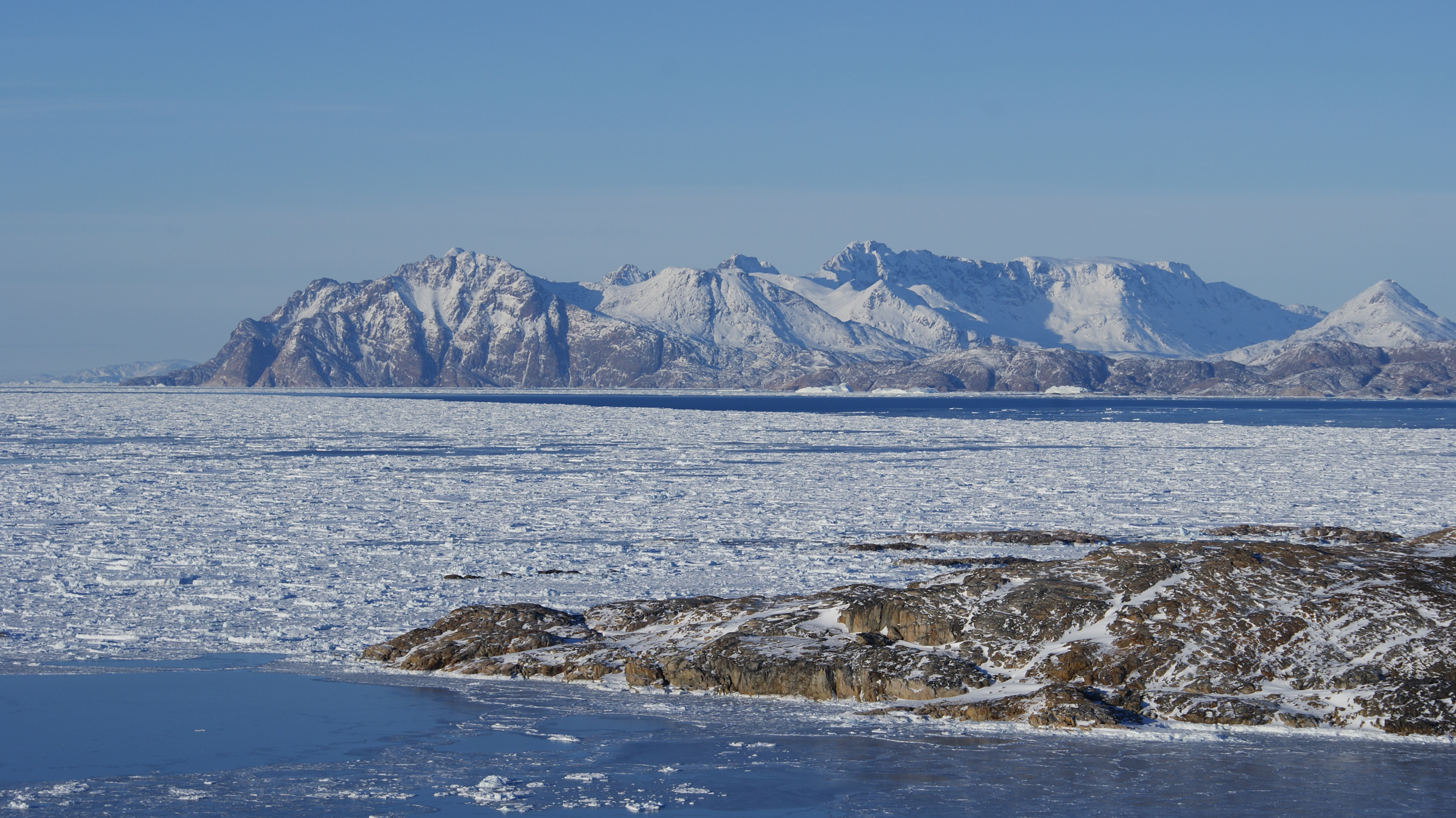
- Ammassalik Island seen from Kulusuk Island

- Location of Ammassalik Island in Greenland
- Interactive map of Ammassalik

Geography
- Location: Irminger Sea
- Coordinates: 65°43′N 37°35′W
- Archipelago: Ammassalik Archipelago
- Adjacent to: North Atlantic Ocean
- Area: 699 km^{2} (270 sq mi)
- Area rank: 10th largest in Greenland
- Highest elevation: 1,352 m (4436 ft)

Administration
- Greenland
- Municipality: Sermersooq
- Largest settlement: Tasiilaq

Demographics
- Population: 2,017 (2013)
- Pop. density: 2.9/km^{2} (7.5/sq mi)
- Ethnic groups: Inuit

Ammassalik Island (Danish: Kong Oscars Ø "King Oscar Island") is an island in the Sermersooq municipality in southeastern Greenland, with an area of 772 km^{2} (298.1 mi^{2}).

== Geography ==
Ammassalik Island is located in the King Christian IX Land region. Separating Ammassalik Island from the mainland of Greenland are the wide Sermilik Fjord in the west and the Ikaasartivaq Strait in the northeast. To the east and southeast, the progressively wider southern half of the Ammassalik Fjord separates the island from the remainder of the eponymous Ammassalik Archipelago. Islands in the archipelago include Kulusuk Island, across the Torsuut Tunoq sound, and Apusiaajik Island, the largest. Ammassalik Island's southern coast borders the Irminger Sea, a marginal sea of the open North Atlantic.

The town of Tasiilaq is located on the island's southeastern side. The highest point of the island is a glaciated peak in the northern part, at 1,352 m (4,435.7 ft).

== Settlements ==
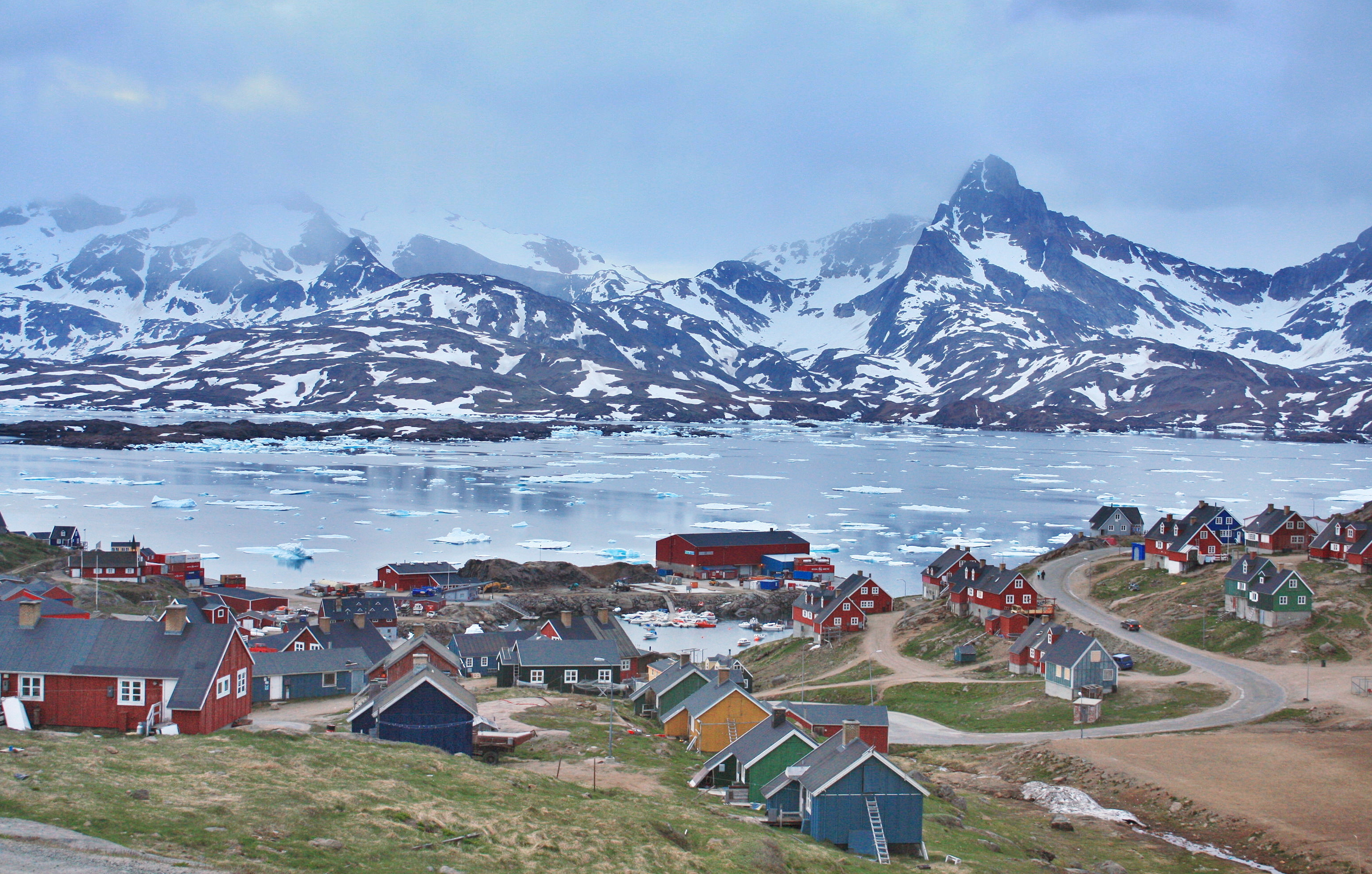
Tasiilaq on Ammassalik Island

The only permanently inhabited settlement on the island is Tasiilaq town on the south coast of the island, with 1,893 inhabitants as of 2009, the most populous community on the eastern coast, and the seventh-largest town in Greenland.

The research station Sermilik is located 15 km northwest of Tasiilaq on the west coast.

Ammassalik Municipality was a former municipality of Greenland. It is now part of Sermersooq Municipality.

== See also ==
- List of islands of Greenland
