= Qalorujoorneq =

Mountain range in Greenland

Qalorngoorneq
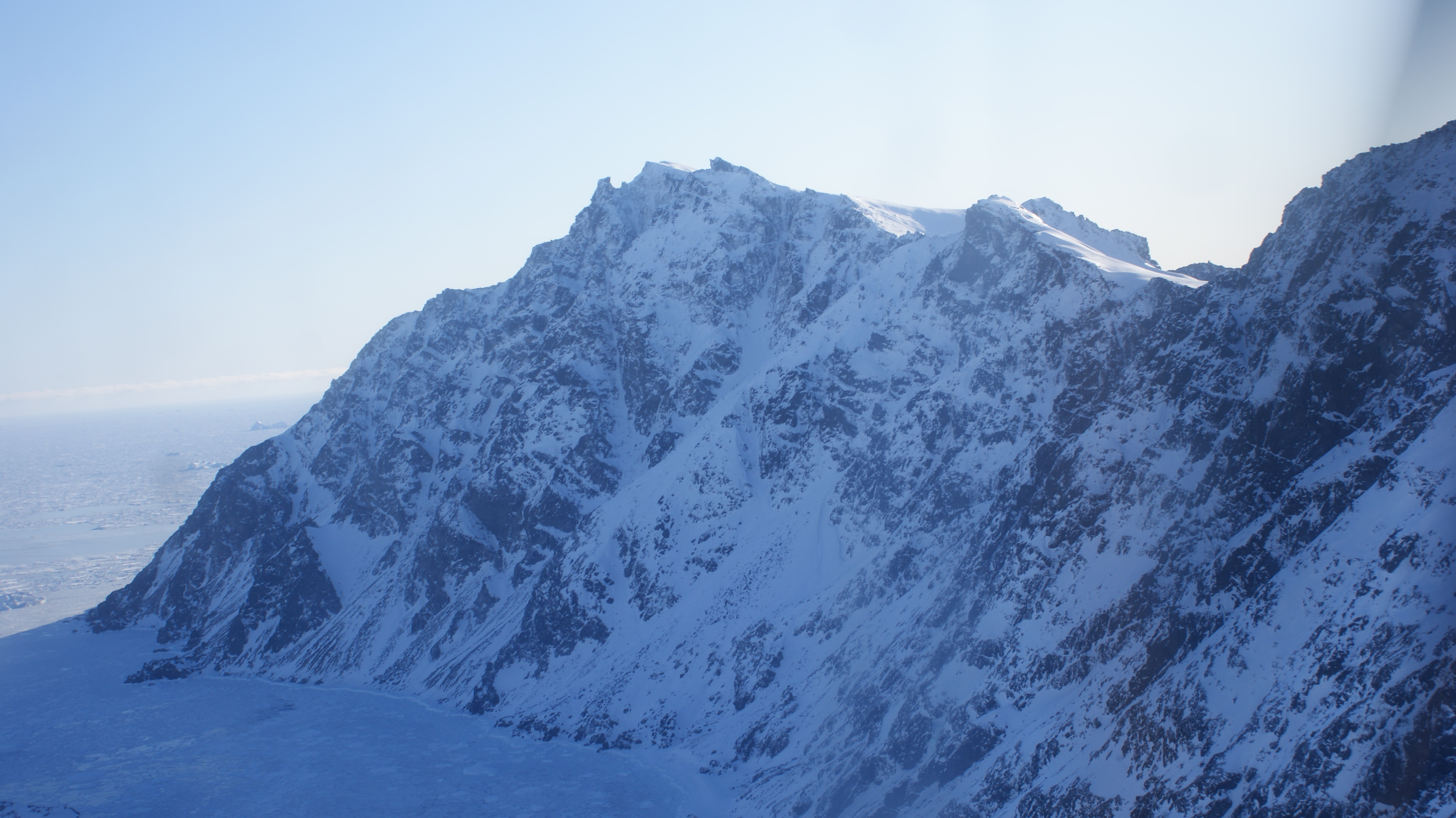
- Aerial view of Saajat from the north

Highest point
- Elevation: 676 m (2,218 ft)

Geography
- Location within Greenland
- Country: Greenland
- Range coordinates: 65°33′N 37°5′W

Qalorngoorneq is a small mountain range in the eastern part of Kulusuk Island in Sermersooq, southeastern Greenland. At 676-metre-high (2,218 ft), its highest point is the highest mountain on the island.

== Geography ==
Qalorngoorneq is located in the eastern part of Kulusuk Island, to the southeast of the Kulusuk Airport.

=== Walls ===
To the northeast and to the east, Qalorngoorneq walls fall directly into the North Atlantic. The southern wall is the smallest, and the easiest to ascend. Its western wall is the widest, with a prominent pillar in the center falling into a post-glacial cirque filled by the Qalorngoorner Imerarpia lake.

=== Ridges ===
Qalorngoorneq has three ridges. Its southeastern ridge extends to the southeastern promontory on the island, with two distinct peaks: Saajat at 603 metres (1,978 ft) and Kangeq at 280 metres (919 ft).

The southwestern ridge is the easiest route to the summit, petering out with several rounded trabants in its lower reaches to the south and southwest of the lake.

The northwestern ridge falls from the nearly flat summit ridge with a series of trabants, the first and highest a rocky pinnacle, the other progressively lower and rounder, extending into the interior of the island above the central reservoir lake.

== See also ==
- List of mountain ranges of Greenland
