= Kulusuk Airport =

Airport in Kulusuk, Greenland

Kulusuk Airport Mittarfik Kulusuk
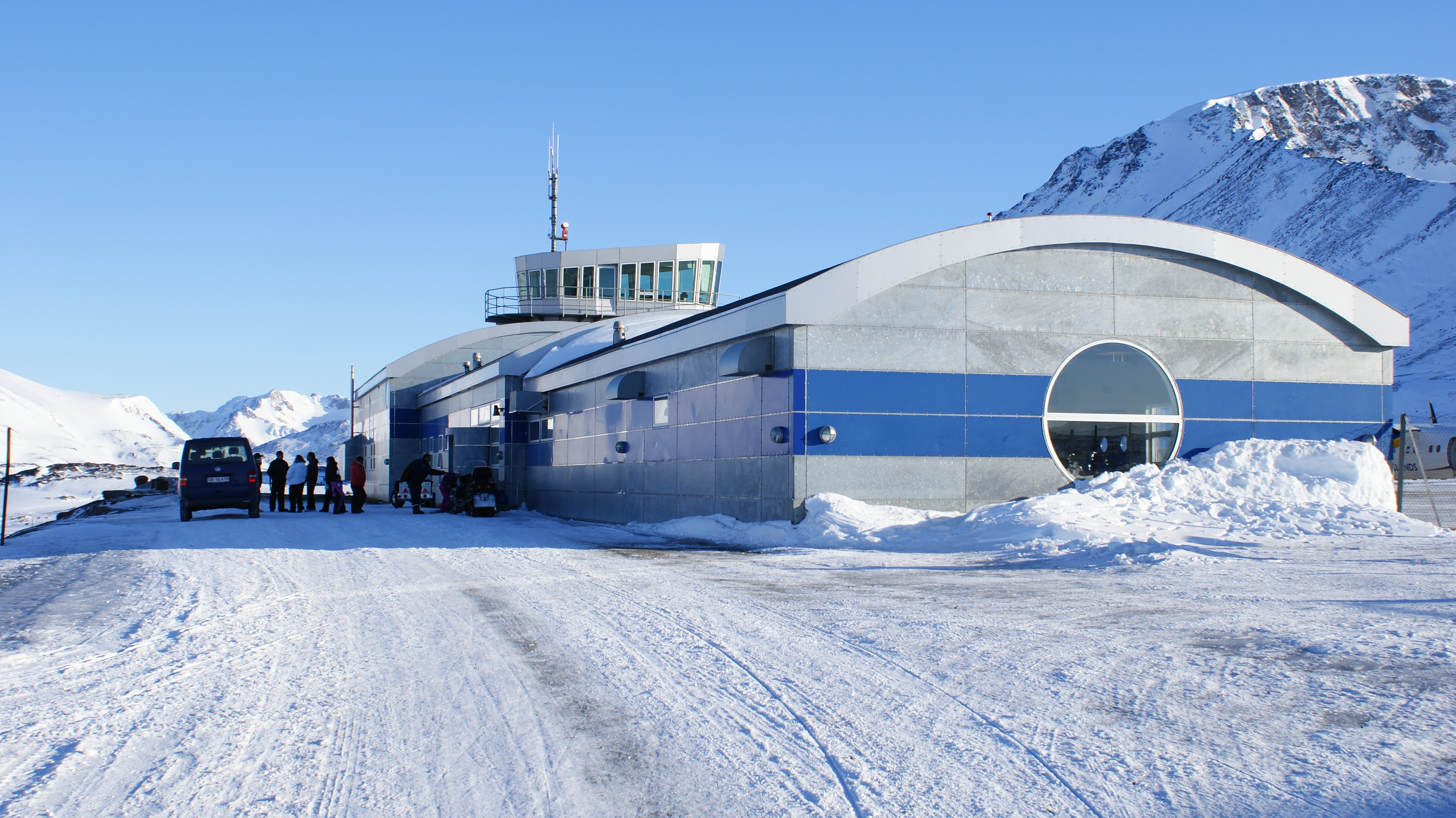
- IATA: KUS; ICAO: BGKK

Summary
- Airport type: Public
- Operator: Greenland Airports (Mittarfeqarfiit)
- Serves: Kulusuk, Greenland
- Elevation AMSL: 117 ft (36 m)
- Coordinates: 65°34′25″N 037°07′25″W
- Website: Kulusuk Airport

Map
- Location in Greenland

Runways
Direction	Length		Surface
Direction	m	ft	Surface
11/29	1,199	3,934	Gravel

Statistics (2012)
- Passengers: 14,738
- Source: Danish AIS

Kulusuk Airport (Greenlandic: Mittarfik Kulusuk) (IATA: KUS, ICAO: BGKK) is an airport in Kulusuk, a settlement on an island of the same name off the shore of the North Atlantic in the Sermersooq municipality in southeastern Greenland.

== History ==
The airstrip was built by the U.S. military in 1956, in order to support a DYE Station, part of the Distant Early Warning Line. The DYE-4 station is located on the south tip of Kulusuk Island, linked by a 8 km (5 mi) road. The U.S. departed the site and airport in 1991. Many remnants of the US military use of the field remain, including vehicles and plant used by the military to maintain the strip. Like some other airports in Greenland it was not built at a location suitable for civilian travel, i.e. not near the local major settlement. Helicopters are used for the local transfer, as there is too much ice for boats during parts of the year. There are political discussions on building a new airport at Tasiilaq, a major settlement in the region, and close to Kulusuk Airport.

During an operation in the early 1990s Kulusuk Airport was the base of operations for a team attempting to recover a US Air Force Lockheed P-38 Lightning from a glacier approximately 80 miles away. The aircraft was originally part of a flight of 6 P-38 and 2 B-17 bombers taking part in Operation Bolero during WW2. The team recovered a P-38 in 1992 and when rebuilt to flying condition the aircraft was named Glacier Girl. The story of its recovery is displayed on the wall inside the departures hall.

Air Alpha operated helicopter flights on-demand by two Bell 212 helicopters in the 1990s to early 2000s. Air Greenland later assumed responsibility of helicopter flights.

After the U.S. left the airport, in 1992 work began on a new terminal building and associated service buildings to replace a 200 m^{2} shed previously in use. It was designed by Icelandic architect Sveinn Ívarsson of Arkítektastofan sf. in cooperation with Verkfræðistofa FHG and constructed by C.G. Jensen of Denmark. The new terminal opened in December 1994.

In 1959, Icelandair began operating day trips during the summer to Kulusuk from Reykjavík Airport operated using Fokker F27 Friendship aircraft, arriving in the morning and departing in the evening. This created an influx of day-tripping tourists and a small tourism industry was created in Kulusuk. Icelandair ceased offering day trips in 2019, but continues to serve the airport with a more conventional flight schedule. Kulusuk Airport has, in cooperation with Icelandair, installed de-icing facilities since the winter of 2014–2015.

In 2023, flights were moved from the downtown Reykjavík Airport to the larger Keflavík Airport, to improve onward connections. From 2025, Icelandair reduced its service to serve Kulusuk seasonally only during summer, which was criticised by locals in Kulusuk.

== Operations ==
Approaching Kulusuk Airport from the east

Unlike the Tasiilaq heliport on the nearby Ammassalik Island, the airport in Kulusuk can serve light and medium fixed wing aircraft, thus functioning as a mini-hub for Tasiilaq.

The terminal building hosts a small cafeteria, and a duty-free stand in the departures/arrivals hall. Accessible restrooms are available.

Access to the departures hall is limited due to the need to screen purchases at the duty-free. Passengers are only allowed to pass through the hall immediately before boarding, resulting in a lack of separation between arriving and departing passengers in the waiting check-in hall. Most arrivals and departures are synchronised in time to facilitate transfers between Icelandair passengers and Air Greenland passengers bound for Nuuk and by helicopter to Tasiilaq. The waiting hall is not sufficient to accommodate all passengers, resulting in a pre-boarding chaos.

Given the increasing number of passengers travelling through the airport due to connections provided by Icelandair, both domestic to Nuuk and international to Iceland, the number of fixed-schedule helicopter flights to Tasiilaq is not sufficient to cover demand.

== Airlines and destinations ==
Airlines	Destinations
Air Greenland	Nuuk, Tasiilaq
Icelandair	Seasonal: Reykjavík–Keflavík

== Accidents and incidents ==
- On 2 July 1972, Douglas C-47B F-WSGU of Rousseau Aviation was damaged beyond economic repair in an accident.
- On 20 April 1985, a problem was encountered with the additional fuel tanks that a Fokker F27 Friendship (registered YN-BZF) had been fitted with for the delivery flight to Aeronica from Europe to Managua, Nicaragua. Augusto C. Sandino International Airport. The pilots decided to return to Kulusuk Airport in Greenland, the place of their most recent fuel stop, but failed to do so. The aircraft crashed on a snow-covered strip, killing two of the five occupants.
