= Kulusuk Island =

Island in Sermersooq, Greenland

Kulusuk
- Geography of Kulusuk Island
- Interactive map of Kulusuk

Geography
- Location: North Atlantic
- Coordinates: 65°33′N 37°07′W

Administration
- Greenland
- Municipality: Sermersooq

Kulusuk Island (Greenlandic: Kulusup qeqertaa) is an island in the Sermersooq municipality on the southeastern shore of Greenland. It is an outlying island in the Ammassalik archipelago of islands on the coast of the North Atlantic. The island is home to Kulusuk, the fourth-largest settlement on the entire eastern coast of Greenland. The island has an area of 41.98 km^{2}, and measures 8 km (5.0 mi) from north to south and 11 km (6.8 mi) from west to east. The Kulusuk Airport on the island is one of the two airports on the entire eastern Greenland coast.

== History ==
Among the archaeological ruins on Kulusuk the ancient settlement of Ikaasap Ittiva (Ikâsap Igtiva) is located near the shore at the northern end of the island. This site belongs to the oldest phase of the Saqqaq culture, around 2000 BCE.

== Geography ==
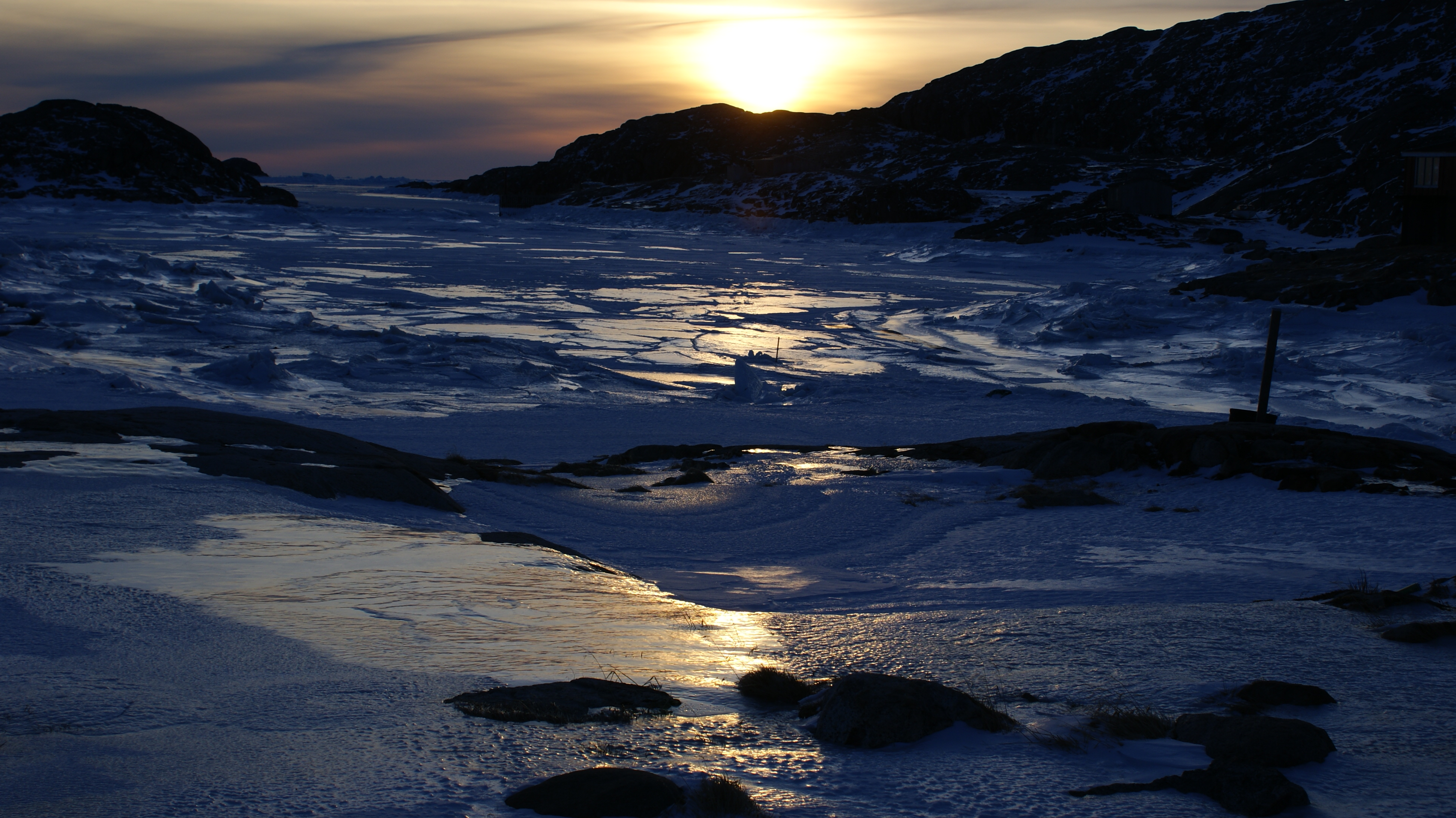
Noorajik cape seen from the open-air winter bivouac on the shore of the icebound Tiivtingaleq bay.

The island is hilly throughout, with several distinct mountains dominating the eastern and southern coast. The southernmost point is the Naujaangivit cape (Danish: Kap Dan − a name often extended to the settlement or the island) under the Isikajia mountain (336 m (1,102.4 ft)).

To the northeast the island is separated from the Apusiaajik Island by the Ikaasaartik Strait. In the north, the Torsuut Tunoq sound separates it from the small, uninhabited Akinaaq island, ultimately linking it to the Ammassalik Fjord in the northwest. To the south and east the island shores are washed by the icy waters of the North Atlantic, through which flows the East Greenland Current.

=== Promontories ===
Name	Direction	Latitude N	Longitude W
Noorajik	Northwestern Cape	65°33′55″	37°13′30″
(none)	Northern Cape	65°35′09″	37°07′40″
Kangeq	Southeastern Cape	65°32′10″	37°01′20″
Naujaangivit	Southern Cape	65°31′07″	37°10′58″

=== Coast ===
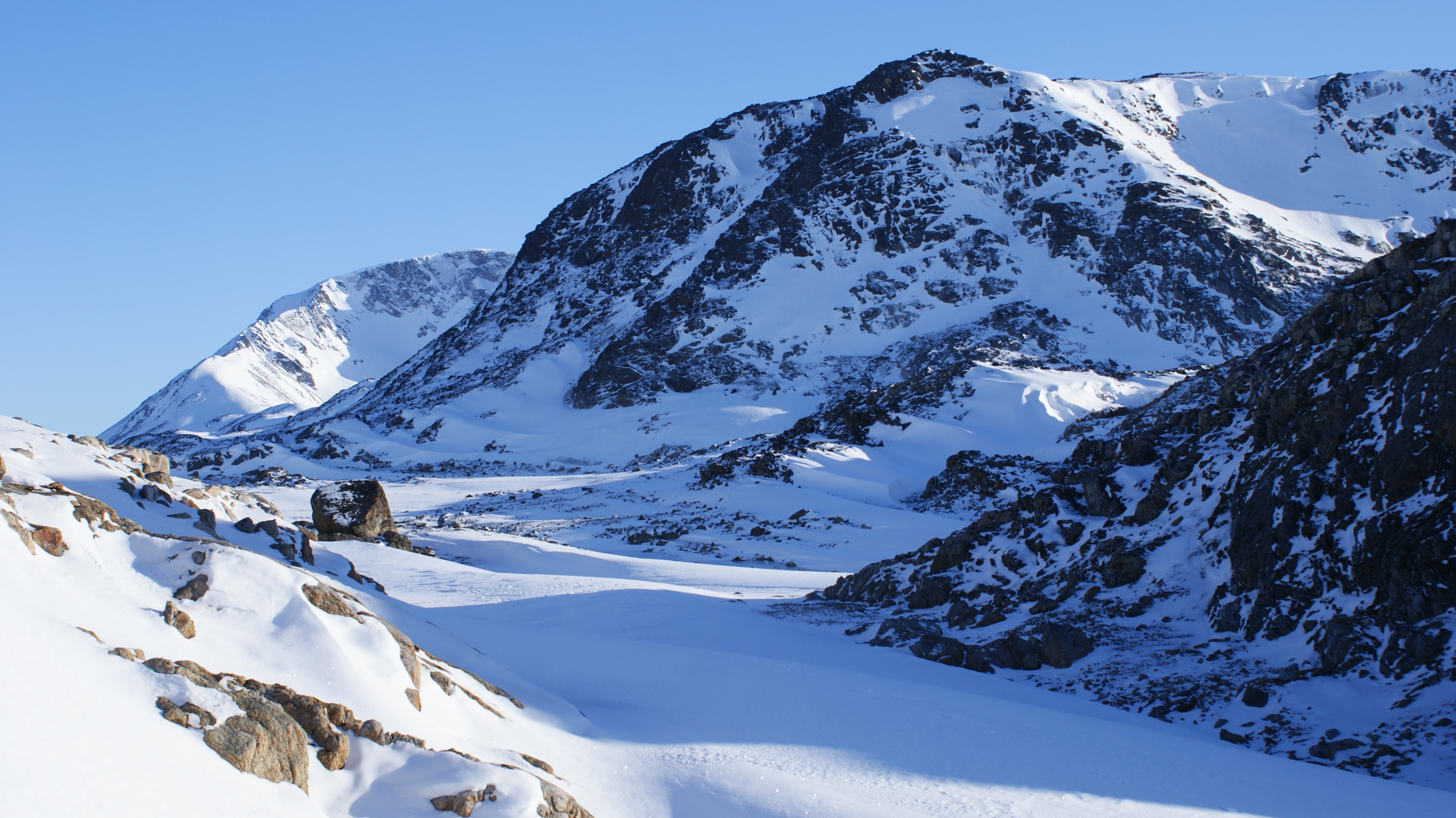
Interior of Kulusuk Island

The coast of most of the island is mostly undeveloped, with the mountain walls and slopes falling directly into the ocean. In the west there are several small peninsulas and bays. The largest of the latter is Tiivtingaleq bay to the southwest of the settlement, host to a small harbour used both in all seasons as a starting point for hunting trips.

A group of tiny skerries surrounds the coastline in the west, as well as in the north in the vicinity of the village. From north to south, the western skerries are: Sitte, Puullortuluk, Ittitalik, Ittive, and Saattit.

=== Mountains ===
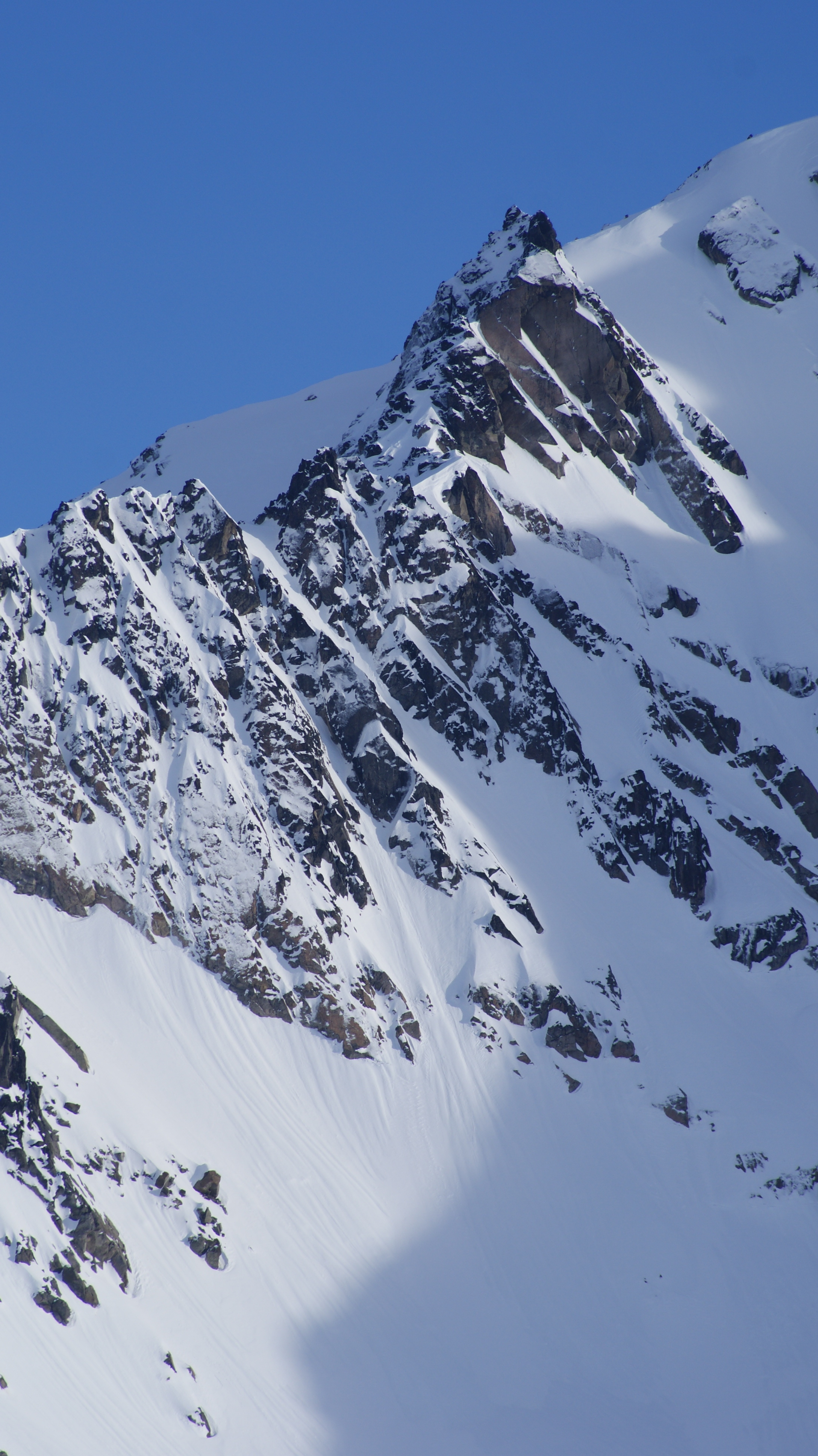
Pinnacle in the northwestern ridge of Qalorujoorneq

The island is hilly, and unlike its immediate neighbours, not glaciated, albeit covered with ice for more than half of the year. The highest point on the island is the summit of Qalorujoorneq, at 676 m (2,217.8 ft) topping a wide mountain massif in the southeast, directly above the Kulusuk Airport. Qalorujoorneq has three ridges. Its southeastern ridge extends to the southeastern promontory on the island, with two distinct peaks: Saajat at 603 metres (1,978 ft) and Kangeq at 280 metres (919 ft).

=== Lakes ===
There is one larger lake on the island, Qalorujoornep Tasia, located in a post-glacial cirque in the heart of the island directly west of the western wall of Qalorujoorneq. Its northern shore is situated just shy of the shallow saddle in the northwestern ridge of the mountain, directly above the airport. During the brief summer a stream flows to the west, to then turn north through the depression in the center of the island, to join the second-largest lake on the island, serving as a water reservoir for the settlement. The reservoir empties into a smaller pond on the edge of the village just south of the coastal scarp. The outflow from the reservoir leads to the west, through a series of smaller interior lakes, draining into Tiivtingaleq bay. All lakes and streams are frozen during winter.

== See also ==
- List of islands of Greenland
