= Heim Glacier (Greenland) =

Glacier in Greenland

- Heim Gletscher
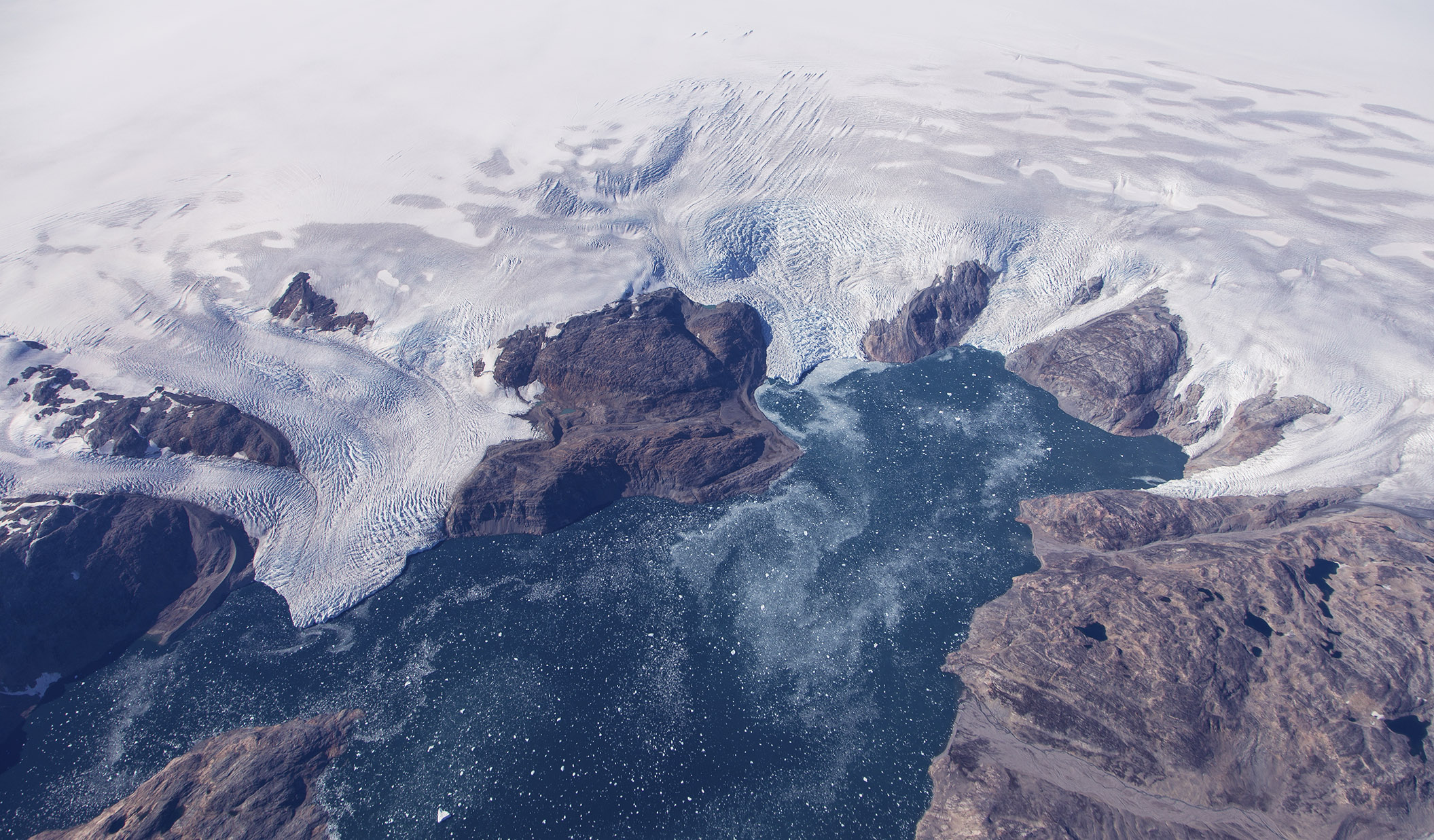
- Head of Johan Petersen Fjord showing the terminuses of the Heim and the Bruckner Glacier (left). NASA HU-25 Falcon picture.

- Location within Greenland
- Type: Piedmont glacier
- Location: East Greenland
- Coordinates: 65°59′N 38°27′W
- Width: 1 km (0.62 mi)
- Terminus: Johan Petersen Fjord

Heim Glacier (Danish: Heim Gletscher), is a glacier in eastern Greenland. It is named after Swiss geologist and glacial phenomena expert Albert Heim (1849–1937).

== Geography ==
The Heim Glacier originates in the Eastern side of the Greenland Ice Sheet. It flows roughly southeastward about 6 km (3.7 mi) to the north of the Bruckner Glacier. It has its terminus in the eastern side of the head of Johan Petersen Fjord separated by nunataks from the terminus of the Bruckner Glacier to the east.

Together the Heim and Bruckner glaciers discharge icebergs into the inner part of the fjord.

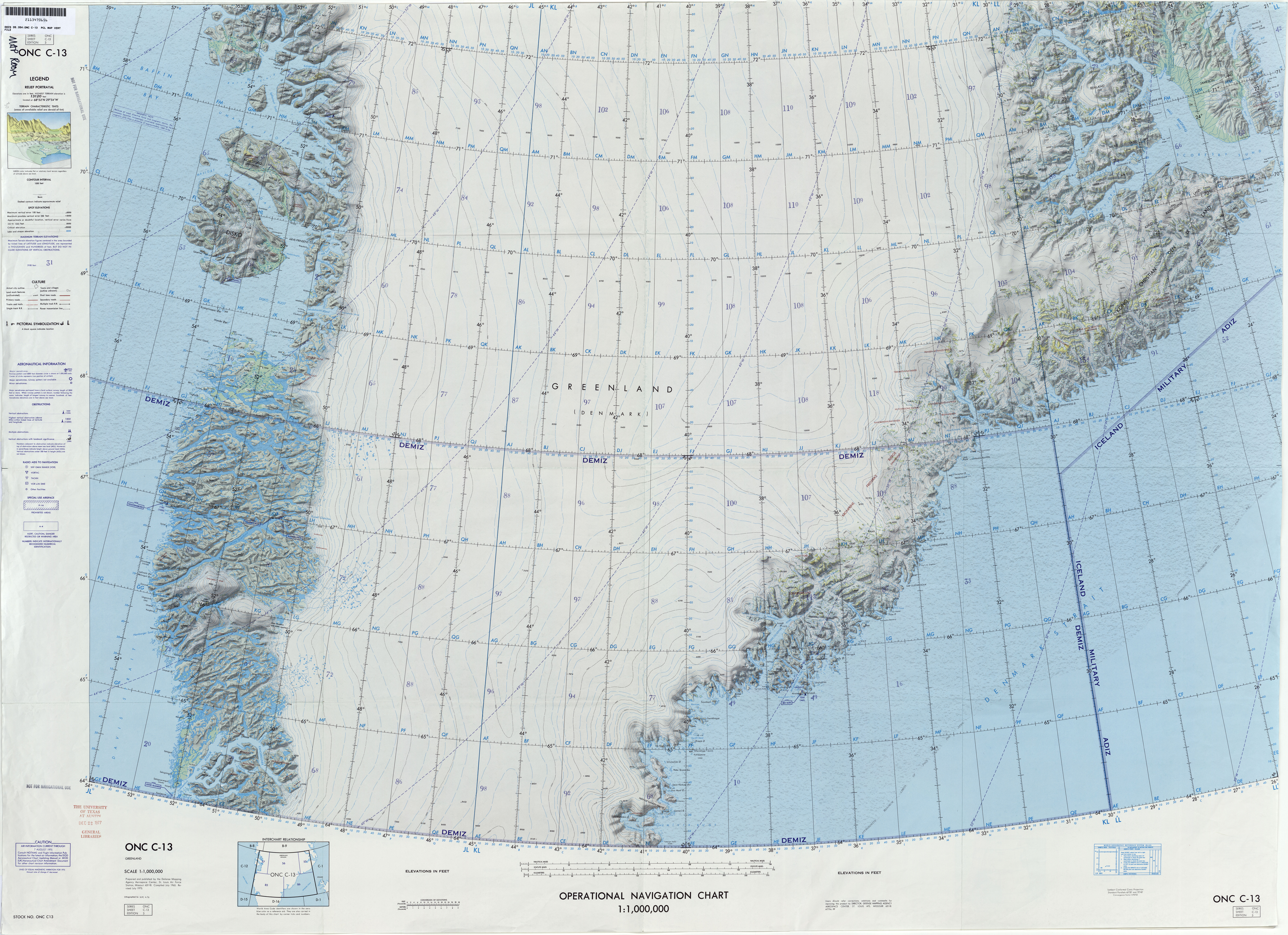
Map of part of Greenland section.

== Bibliography ==
- Climate-related glacier fluctuations in southeast Greenland

== See also ==
- List of glaciers in Greenland
