= Mont Forel =

Mountain in Sermersooq Municipality, Greenland

- Location of Mont Forel within Greenland

Highest point
- Elevation: 3,383 m (11,099 ft)
- Prominence: 1,581 m (5,187 ft)
- Listing: North America isolated peaks 54th; Ultra prominent peak
- Coordinates: 66°56′06″N 36°47′15″W

Geography
- Location: Sermersooq, Greenland
- Parent range: Schweizerland

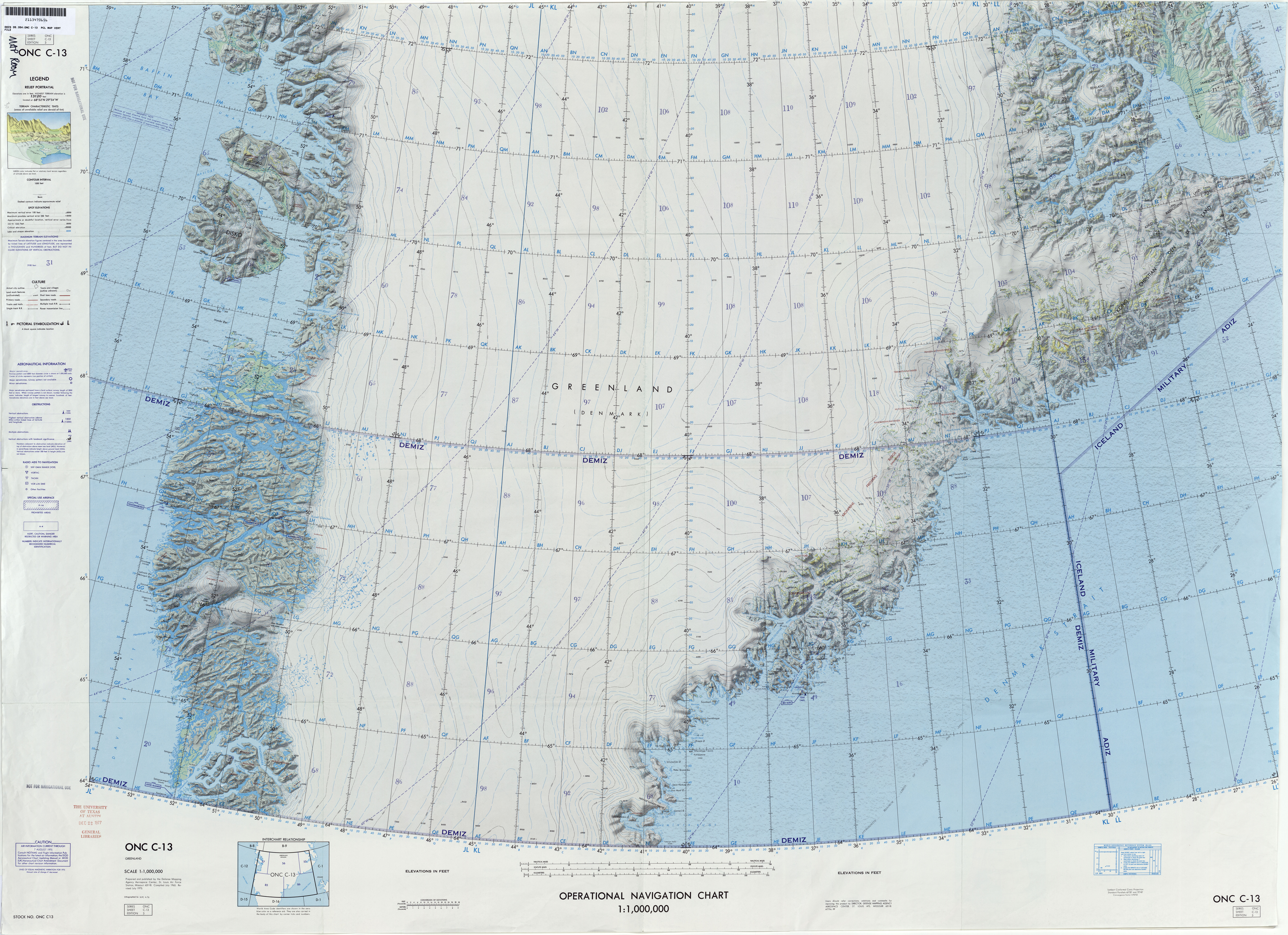
Defense Mapping Agency map of Greenland sheet.

Mont Forel is a mountain in King Christian IX Land, Sermersooq Municipality, Greenland. It is part of the Schweizerland range, also known as 'Schweizerland Alps'.

This peak is located in a popular climbing destination, together with the Watkins Range to the northeast and the Stauning Alps further north.

== History ==
The mountain was named in 1912 by Swiss geophysicist and Arctic explorer Alfred de Quervain after his Greenland icecap crossing from Godhavn (Qeqertarsuaq) on the west, to Sermilik Fjord on the eastern side.

Mont Forel was first climbed by a Swiss expedition of the Akademischer Alpen-Club of Zürich led by André Roch in 1938.

== Geography ==
Mont Forel is the highest peak outside of the area of the Watkins Range, where the highest mountain, Gunnbjørn Fjeld, rises. It is located just north of the Arctic Circle in the Schweizerland Alps, north of Sermilik, near Ammassalik Island. Its elevation is 3,383 metres (11,099 ft) and there is an ice dome at the top of the mountain. The Crown Prince Frederick Range stretches northeastwards to the northeast of Mont Forel.

== See also ==
- List of mountain peaks of Greenland
- List of mountains in Greenland
