= Paul Walker (Arctic explorer) =

Paul Walker is an Arctic explorer and Polar Guide born in Shrewsbury, England. He achieved a B.Ed Honours degree in Outdoor Education and Mathematics and has organised more than 250 arctic expeditions to Spitsbergen (Svalbard), Baffin Island (Canada), Iceland and Greenland over 30+ years. In 2006 he led an 8 man team to make the first and only winter ascent of Gunnbjørnsfjeld, the highest mountain in the Arctic Circle.

== Biography ==
Born in Shrewsbury, Shropshire Walker moved to Wetherby aged 8 and later graduated from Charlotte Mason College, Ambleside with a B.Ed Honours degree in Outdoor Education and Mathematics. It was here he led his first Greenland expedition, a 2 month climbing trip to the Schweizerland Alps.

At 23, Walker became one of the UK's youngest Winter Mountain Leaders. In 1993 he made the first ascent of the 28 pitch northeast ridge of Mont Forel in east Greenland. In 1996 he climbed a number of the main summits of the Crown Prince Frederick Range together with members of the Tangent British East Greenland Expedition.

In 1999 he led the first British guided ski crossing of the Greenland Icecap using kites. In 2001 he headed to Svalbard to lead the "Polestar" team to make the first British south-north ski traverse of Spitsbergen.

In 2004 Paul organized and led the US Navy Air Crash Recovery Expedition to the Kronborg Glacier, east Greenland. This expedition was commissioned by the US Navy to recover the human remains of US Navy personnel lost in an earlier air crash of a P-2V Neptune on January 12, 1962.

In 2006 he led an 8 man team to make the first winter ascent of Gunnbjørnsfjeld, the highest mountain in the Arctic Circle. During this expedition the team were attacked during the night at their base camp by a polar bear who ripped through several tents.

Paul has worked extensively as a Greenland location and logistics consultant for numerous TV documentaries, films and marketing projects. He has also worked with a range of celebrities organising their personal adventure holidays, expeditions and TV programme logistics including Ian Wright, Christie Turlington, Paul Rose, Steve Backshall and Google founders Larry Page & Sergei Bryn.

In 2018 he was logistics consultant for the record breaking longest vehicle polar journey in history, with the double south-north-south crossing of the Greenland icecap by three specially adapted 4x4 and 6x6 vehicles, supplied by Arctic Trucks of Reykjavik, Iceland.

He was logistics, safety and location consultant for the latest Disney+ and National Geographic TV channel 3 part expedition documentary series entitled "On The Edge", with Oscar award-winning climber Alex Honnold.

== Personal life ==
After 30 years living in the Lake District, North West England, Paul moved to the small village of Kirknewton, near Wooler, in Northumberland in 2014. Paul has three children.
