= Johan Petersen Fjord =

Fjord in Greenland

- Petersen Bugt
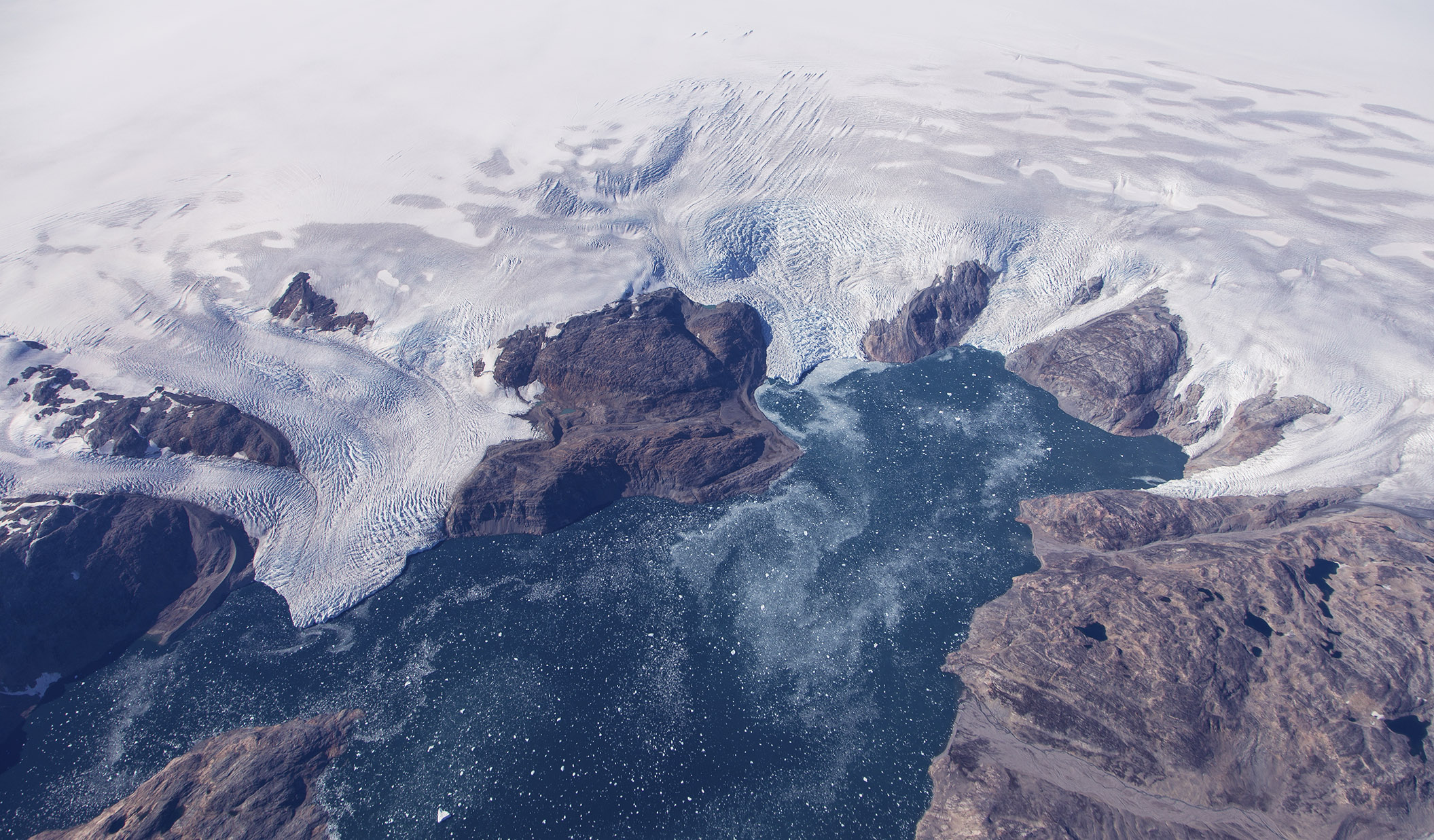
- View of Johan Petersen Fjord from the air. NASA HU-25 Falcon picture.

- Location in Greenland
- Location: East Greenland
- Coordinates: 65°53′N 38°17′W
- Ocean/sea sources: Denmark Strait; North Atlantic Ocean
- Basin countries: Greenland
- Max. length: 20 km (12 mi)
- Max. width: 4 km (2.5 mi)

Johan Petersen Fjord, also known as Petersen Bay (Danish: Petersen Bugt), is a fjord in King Christian IX Land, Eastern Greenland. The fjord is named after Danish Arctic explorer Johan Petersen (1813–1880).

== Geography ==
This fjord is located on the western shore of Sermilik (Sermiligaaq), near Tasiilaq (Ammassalik), about 20 km (12 mi) north of the mouth of the great fjord. Johan Petersen Fjord runs roughly from northwest to southeast for about 20 km (12 mi). The Bruckner and Heim glaciers discharge at the head of the fjord.

Qeertartivatsiaq Island is located on the northern side of the entrance of the fjord. There are Inuit ruins on the southern shore of the island facing the fjord.

== Bibliography ==
- Spencer Apollonio, Lands That Hold One Spellbound: A Story of East Greenland, 2008

== See also ==
- List of fjords of Greenland
