= Bruckner Glacier =

Glacier on Greenland

- Brückner Gletscher
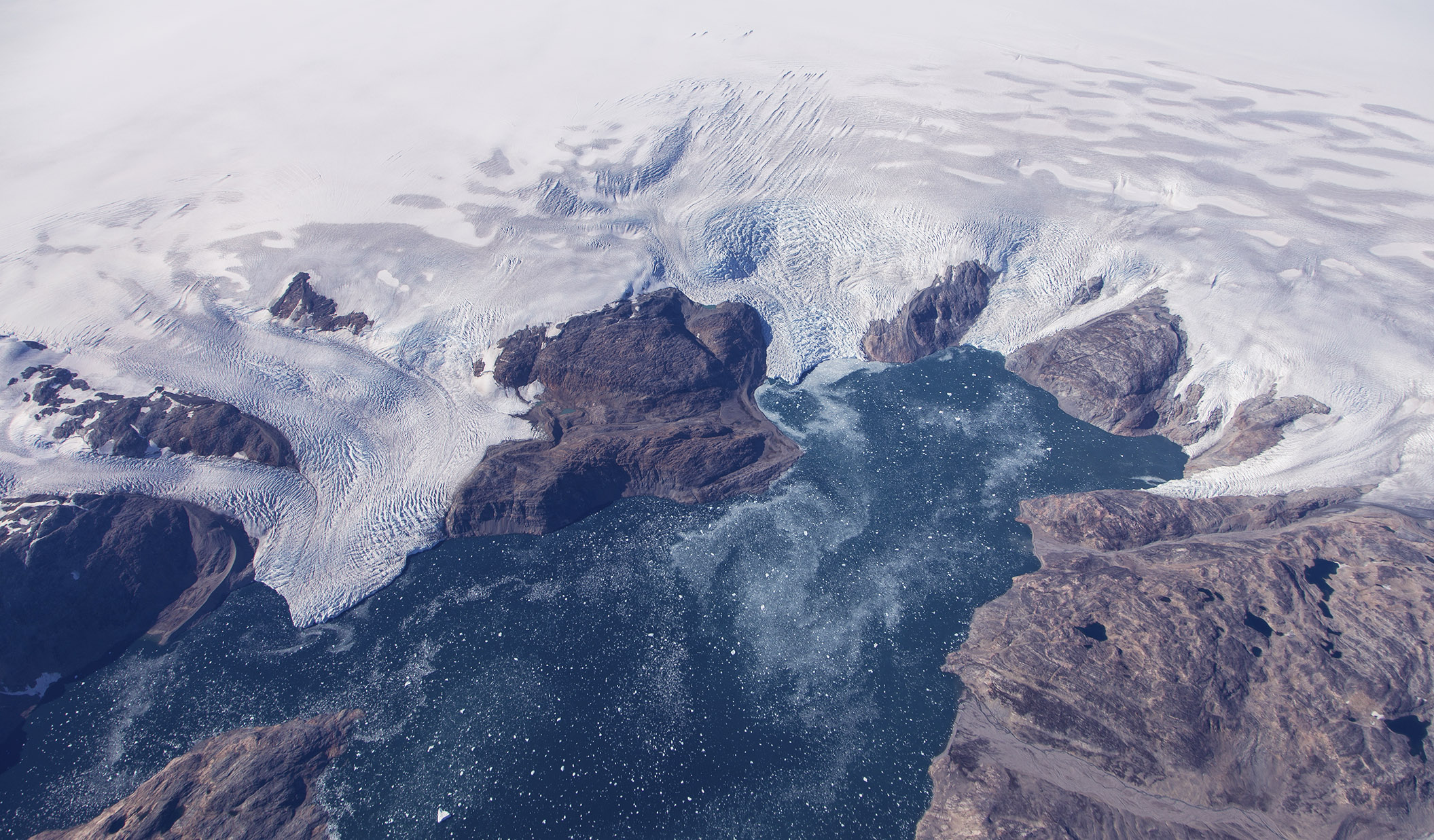
- View of Johan Petersen Fjord from the air with the terminuses of the Bruckner (left) and Heim glaciers. NASA HU-25 Falcon picture.

- Location within Greenland
- Type: Piedmont glacier
- Location: East Greenland
- Coordinates: 65°56′N 38°27′W
- Width: 1.5 km (0.93 mi)
- Terminus: Johan Petersen Fjord

Bruckner Glacier (Danish: Brückner Gletscher), is a glacier in eastern Greenland.

== Geography ==
The Bruckner Glacier originates in the Eastern side of the Greenland Ice Sheet. It flows eastward about 6 km (3.7 mi) to the south of the Heim Glacier. It has its terminus in the eastern side of the head of Johan Petersen Fjord separated by nunataks from the terminus of the Heim Glacier.

Together the Bruckner and Heim glaciers discharge icebergs into the inner part of the fjord.

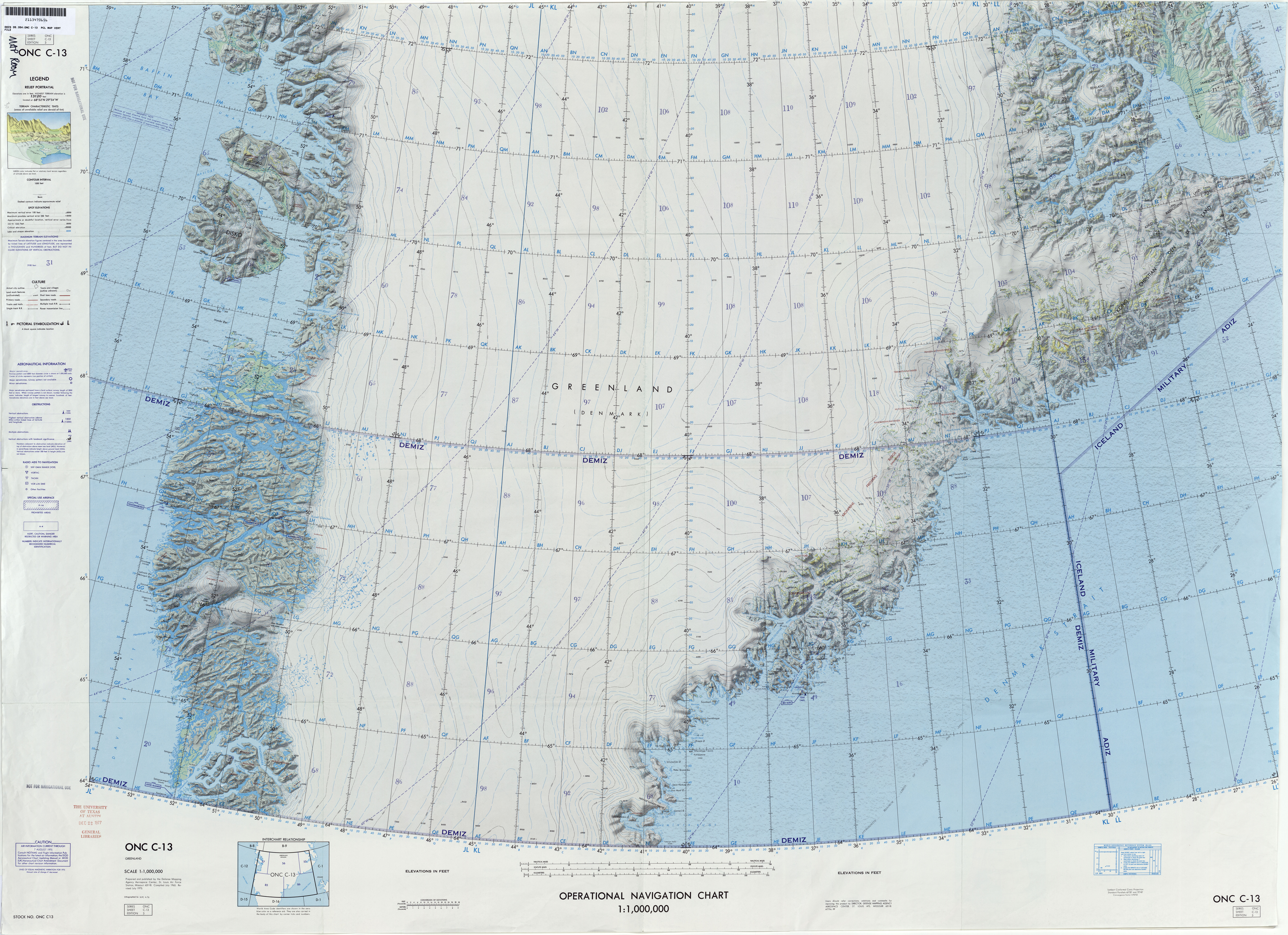
Map of part of Greenland section.

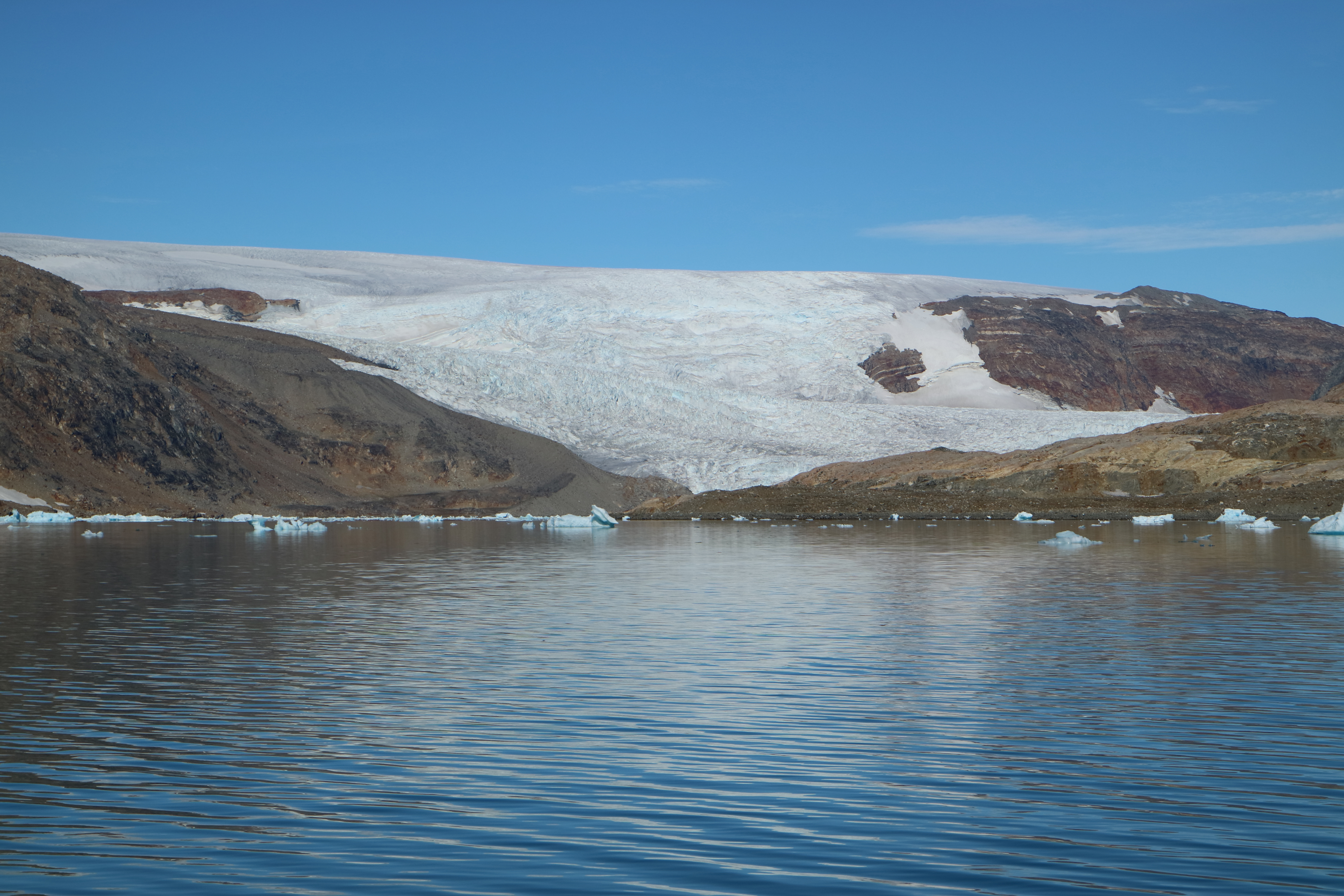
The glacier seen from the fjord (August 2016)

== Bibliography ==
- Climate-related glacier fluctuations in southeast Greenland

== See also ==
- List of glaciers in Greenland
