= Crown Prince Frederik Range =

Mountain range in King Christian IX Land, Greenland

- Kronprins Frederik Bjerge
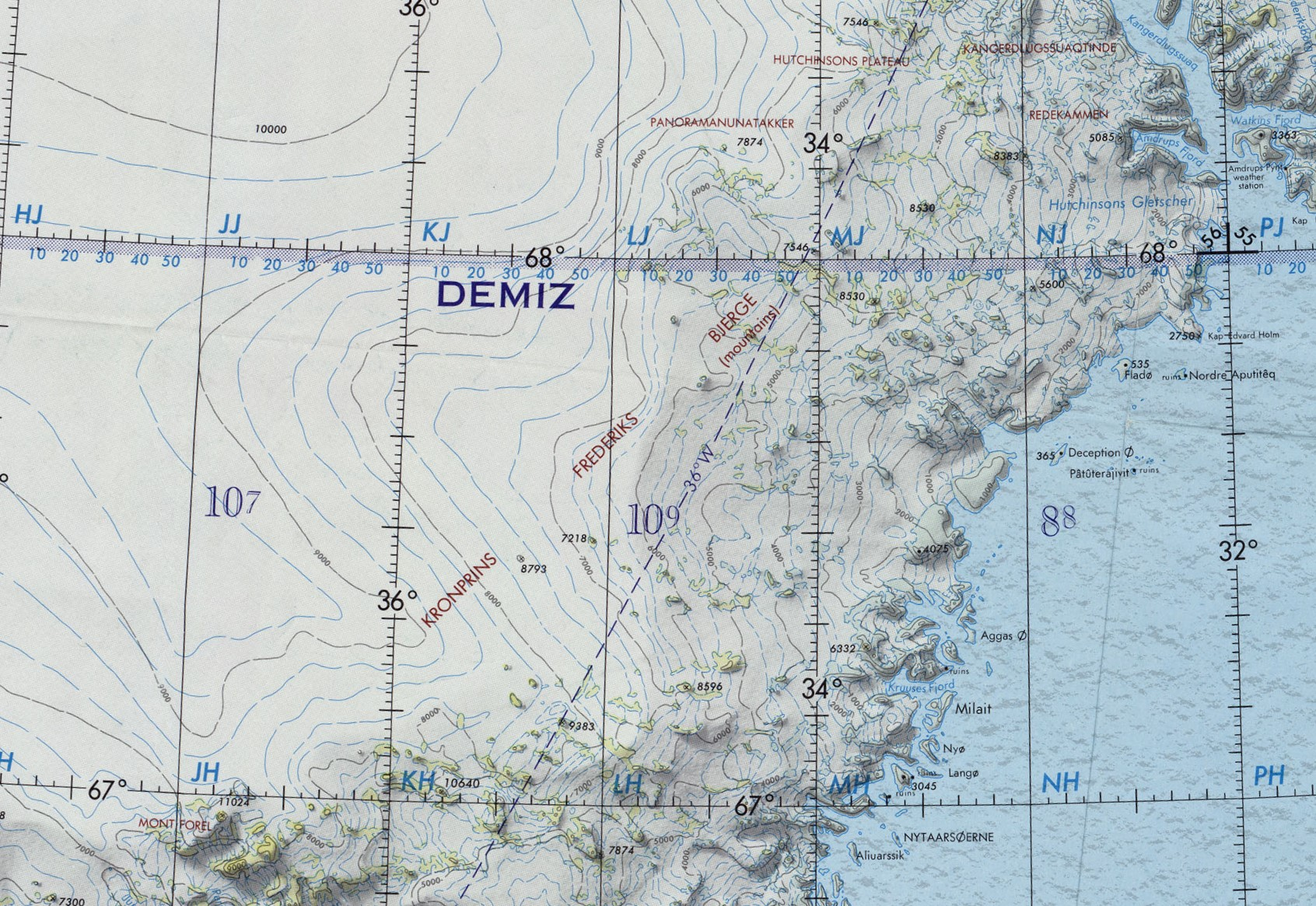
- Defense Mapping Agency map of Greenland detail showing the area of the range.

Highest point
- Elevation: 3,256 m (10,682 ft)

Dimensions
- Length: 130 km (81 mi) NE/SW
- Width: 40 km (25 mi) NW/SE

Geography
- Location within Greenland
- Country: Greenland
- Range coordinates: 67°30′N 34°40′W

The Crown Prince Frederik Range (Danish: Kronprins Frederik Bjerge) is a large mountain range in King Christian IX Land, eastern Greenland. Administratively this range is part of the Sermersooq Municipality.

Despite being relatively unknown it has some of the highest summits in Greenland.

== History ==
The Crown Prince Frederik Range was first surveyed by Sir Martin Lindsay in 1934 during the British Trans-Greenland Expedition and was named after the Crown Prince Frederik of Denmark (1899 – 1972) who would be crowned King Frederik IX in 1947. The expedition crossed Greenland from west to east, and succeeded in fixing the positions of many other important features further to the northeast, including Gunnbjørnsfjeld —the highest point in Greenland. On the return journey the team headed south-west to Amassalik and on their journey discovered the extent of the Crown Prince Frederik Range. Lindsay's expedition set a new world record after travelling 1,050 mi (1,690 km) on sleds, 700 of which were through hitherto unexplored territory.

Following Martin Lindsay's pioneering venture few expeditions visited the range which remained almost consigned to oblivion for many decades. Finally in 1995 the first guided icecap journey through the range was organized and the following year, in July and August 1996, a number of the main summits of the range were climbed for the first time by members of the Tangent British East Greenland Expedition, including Paul Walker. The expedition set up its base camp at 67°11′56″N 35°6′30″W and from there climbed a total of 55 peaks.

== Geography ==
The Crown Prince Frederik Range is a group of nunataks scattered over a vast region between the Greenland Ice Sheet and the coast. It extends for about 130 km (81 mi) in a northeast-southwest direction between the 67th (Schweizerland) and the 68th parallel north (Hutchinson Glacier). The range is located to the northeast of Mont Forel and southwest of Kangerlussuaq Fjord. The level expanses between the nunatak clusters of the range are usually very wide and permanently covered with ice and snow. The average height of the intermontane areas is between 1,600 m (5,200 ft) and 2,000 m (6,600 ft).

The region of the Crown Prince Frederik Mountains is uninhabited, the nearest settlement being Tasiilaq, located about 175 km to the SSW of the southern end of the range.

=== Subranges ===
Panorama Nunatak (68°12′N 33°12′W) and Redkammen (68°13′N 32°26′W) are two large nunataks at the northeastern end. They are located to the southwest and to the southeast of the Hutchinson Plateau respectively and are sometimes included as part of the Crown Prince Frederik Range.

=== Mountains ===
Although most peaks of the Crown Prince Frederik Range are yet unnamed, quite a number of the nunataks have very high summits and a total of nine have peaks are higher than 3,000 m (9,800 ft). Owing to its remote location this large range has been somewhat neglected by mountaineers though, despite some impressive peaks of good granite.

- Peak (3,256 m) and highest point at 67°3′57″N 35°34′50″W
- Peak (3,153 m) at 67°7′5″N 36°14′8″W
- Peak (3,127 m) at 67°0′15″N 35°52′13″W, highest rocky peak of a massive nunatak with many peaks, including a 3,069 m high summit 1.3 km to the west.
- Peak (3,108 m) at 67°3′3″N 35°44′47″W, the spectacular central summit of a nunatak with three peaks.
- Peak (3,092 m) at 67°9′23″N 35°36′9″W
- Peak (3,088 m) at 67°8′39″N 35°44′33″W
- Peak (3,075 m) at 67°4′22″N 36°2′31″W
- Peak (3,056 m) at 67°4′17″N 36°12′59″W
- Peak (3,021 m) at 66°59′20″N 35°34′8″W
- Peak (2,996 m) at 67°6′35″N 35°8′3″W
- Peak (2,995 m) at 67°2′48″N 35°29′4″W
- Peak (2,990 m) at 67°3′52″N 35°55′16″W
- Peak (2,961 m) at 67°4′38″N 35°58′39″W
- Peak (2,948 m) at 67°12′31″N 35°52′23″W
- Peak (2,945 m) at 67°10′18″N 35°26′50″W
- Peak (2,904 m) at 67°6′11″N 35°0′48″W
- Peak (2,897 m) at 67°3′3″N 35°47′6″W
- Peak (2,891 m) at 67°2′16″N 35°43′12″W
- Peak near TBEGE base camp (2,882 m) at 67°13′21″N 35°15′48″W
- Peak (2,830 m) at 66°55′43″N 36°12′14″W
- Peak (2,824 m) at 67°11′22″N 34°59′16″W
- Peak (2,777 m) at 67°0′3″N 35°47′36″W
- Peak (2,542 m) at 67°56′41″N 33°58′45″W
- Peak (2,691 m) at 67°0′15″N 35°48′48″W
- Peak (2,473 m) at 67°56′7″N 33°38′49″W
- Peak (2,465 m) at 67°25′8″N 34°45′38″W
- Peak (2,446 m) at 67°58′10″N 33°50′16″W
- Anniversary Peak (2,440 m)
- Peak (2,425 m) at 68°6′14″N 33°32′23″W
- Peak (2,370 m) at 67°50′40″N 34°10′37″W
- Peak (2,093 m) at 67°24′23″N 34°31′18″W
- Peak (1,831 m) at 67°14′23″N 34°13′25″W

== Climate ==
From the north and from the west the range is fully exposed to the influence of the Greenland Ice Sheet. As there is no barrier to the shrieking cold winds of the icy expanse, ice cap climate prevails in the region.

The average annual temperature in the area of the Crown Prince Frederik Range is -14 °C. The warmest month is July when the average temperature reaches -2 °C and the coldest is March when the temperature sinks to -20 °C.

== See also ==
- List of mountain ranges of Greenland
- List of mountains in Greenland
- List of Nunataks of Greenland
