= Arnold Heim =

Swiss geologist and explorer (1882–1965)

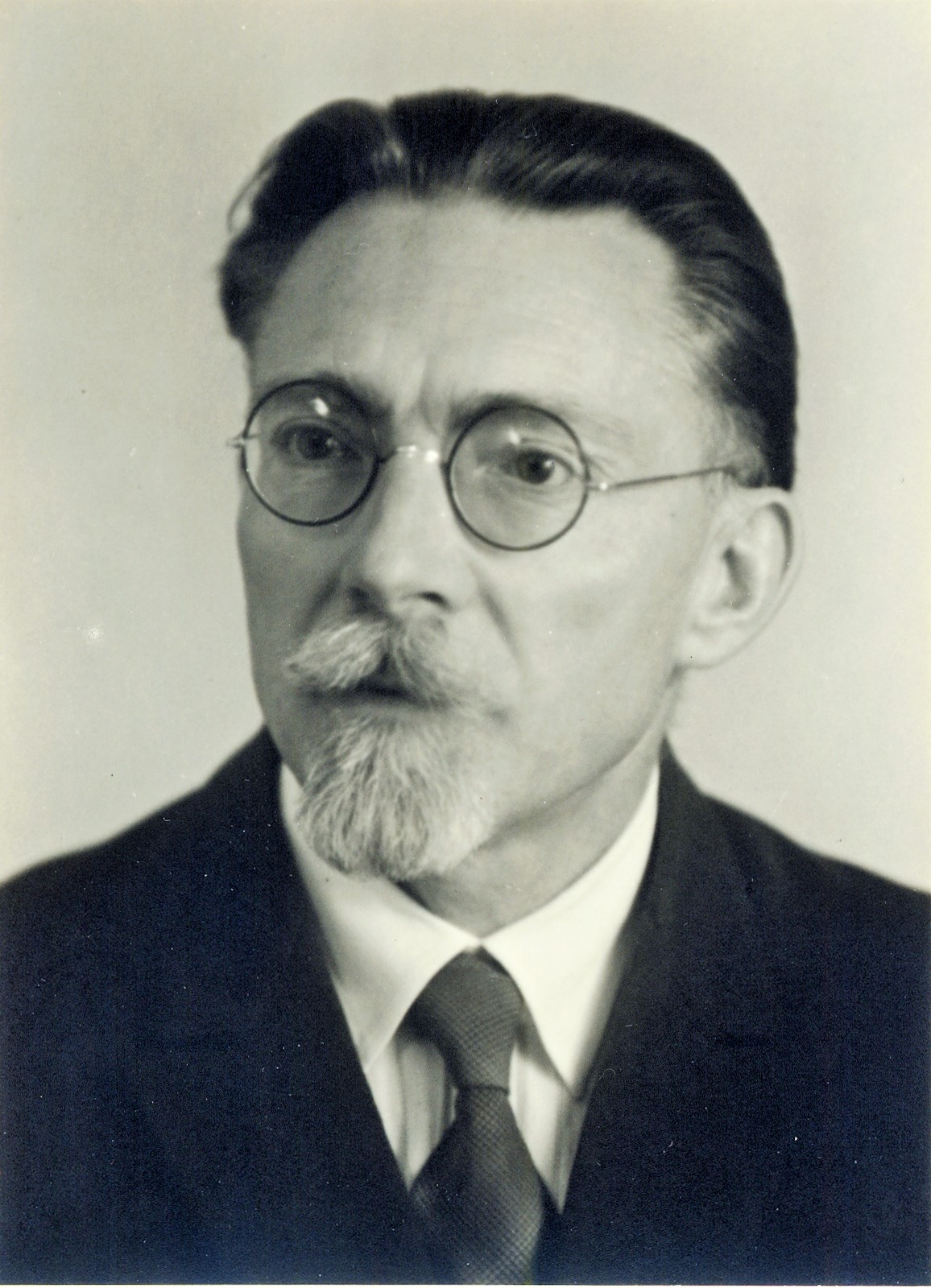
- Arnold Heim, 1936
- Born: 20 March 1882; Zürich
- Died: 27 May 1965 (aged 83); Friedhof Sihlfeld, Zürich
- Education: ETH Zurich, University of Zurich
- Parents: Albert Heim (father); Marie Heim-Vögtlin (mother)
- Scientific career
- Fields: geology
- Workplaces: ETH Zurich, University of Zurich, Sun Yat-Sen University

Arnold Heim (20 March 1882 – 27 May 1965) was a Swiss geologist known for his pioneering research in petrogeology and his geological expeditions across Asia. He made significant contributions to the understanding of relationships between sedimentation and tectonics, and conducted extensive geological surveys in the Himalayas and Southeast Asia.

== Early life and education ==
Born in Zurich, Switzerland, Heim came from a notable scientific family. His father was Albert Heim, a prominent geologist who held the chair of geology at the Federal Polytechnic School in Zurich (now ETH Zurich). His mother, Marie Heim-Vögtlin, was Switzerland's first practicing female physician. Following his father's path, Arnold studied geology at ETH Zurich, where he obtained a diploma as a specialist teacher of natural sciences before completing his doctorate at the University of Zurich.

== Academic career and expeditions ==
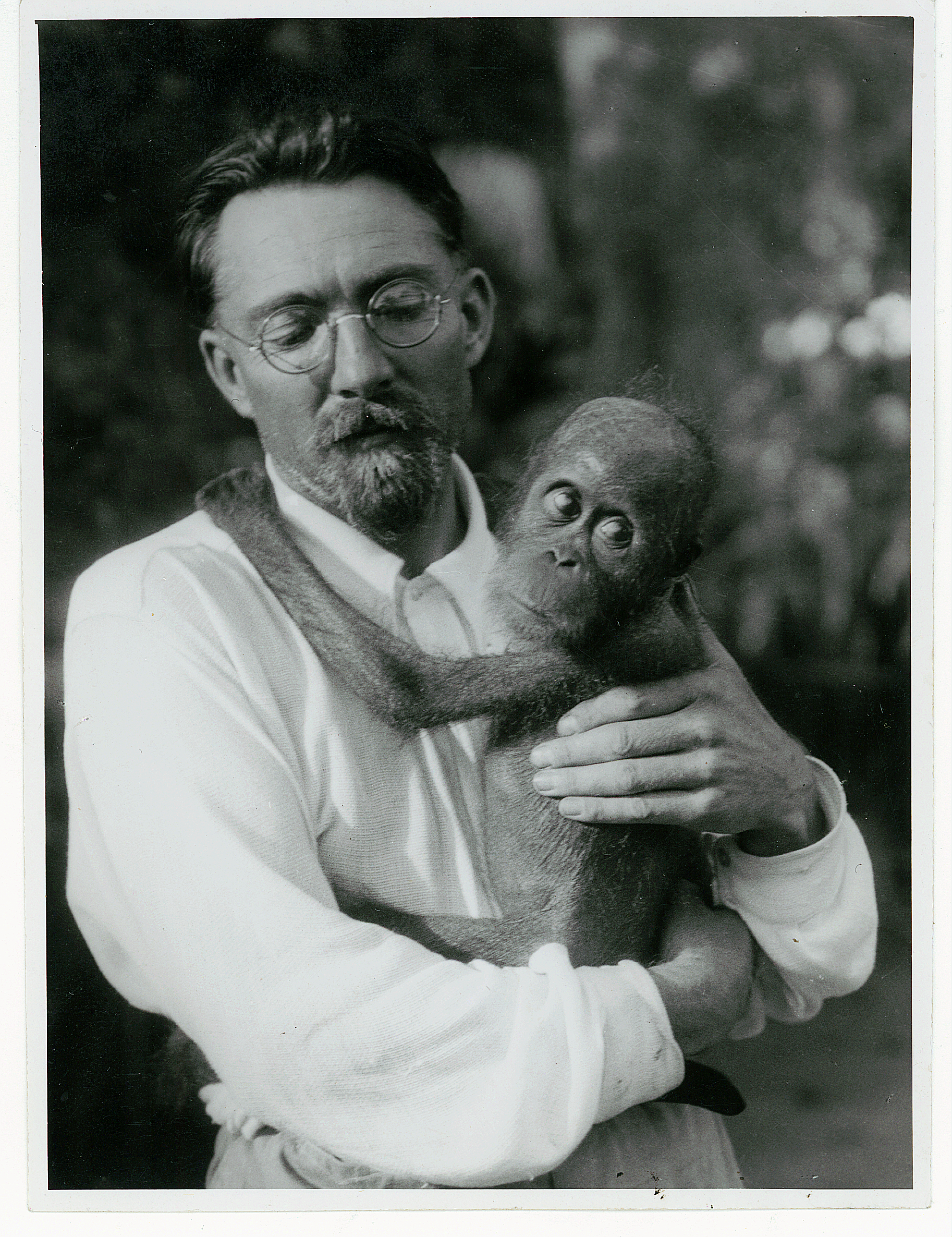
Arnold Heim with baby Orang-Utan (ca. 1928)

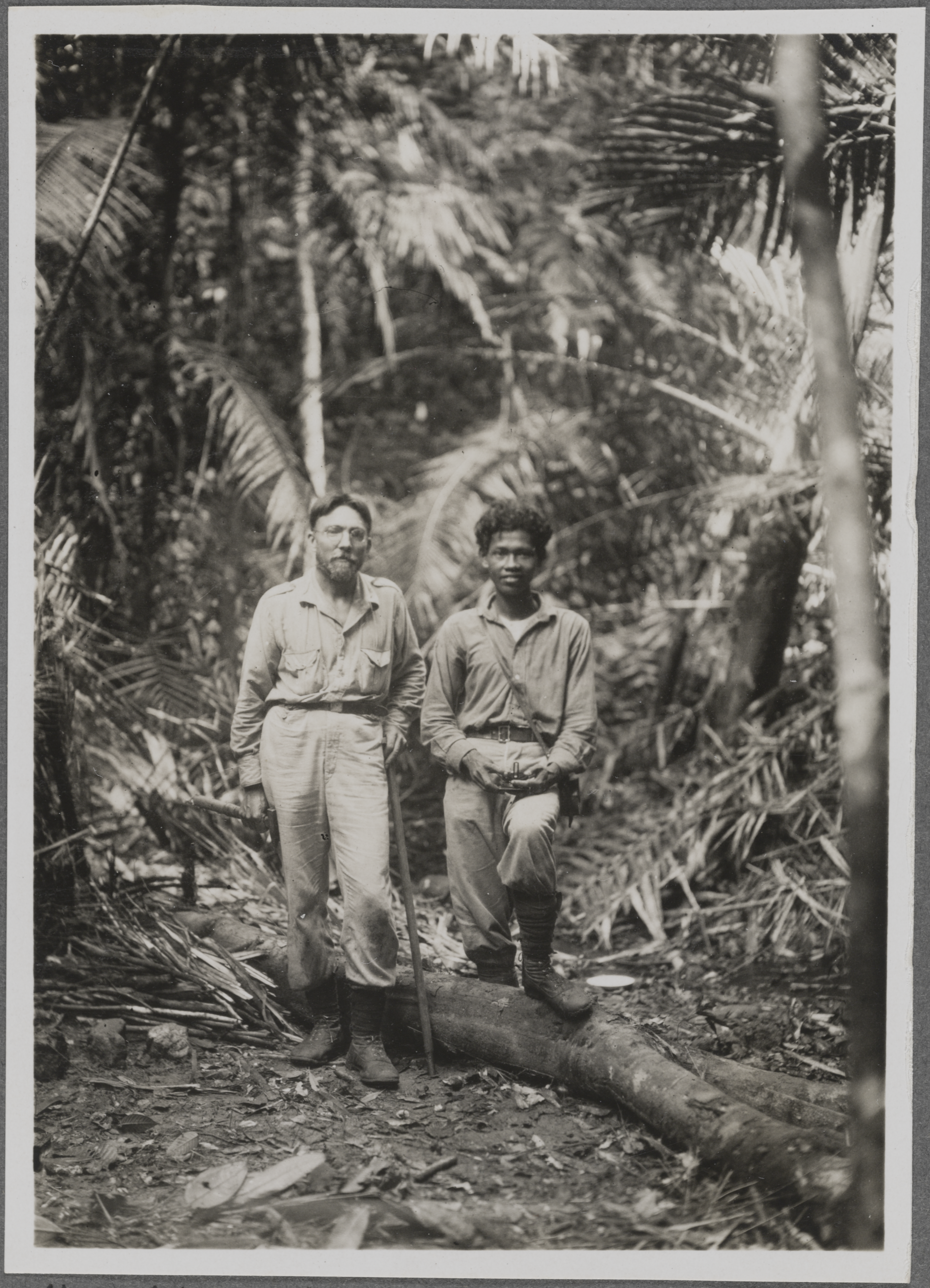
Arnold Heim and the Geometer Suriadi on Java, Indonesia, 2 April 1928

Heim served as a private lecturer at both the University of Zurich and ETH Zurich during two periods: 1908-1911 and 1924–1928. Despite his father's hopes that he would assume the family's academic position, Heim chose a different path, accepting a professorship at Sun Yat-Sen University in Canton, China (1929–1931).

His extensive field research began with participation in Alfred de Quervain's Swiss Greenland expedition in 1909. Between 1910 and 1920, Heim conducted significant petroleum exploration in Java and Sumatra, establishing himself as an authority in petrogeology.

In 1926, Heim embarked on an aerial expedition to South Africa alongside Walter Mittelholzer, René Gouzy, and Hans Hartmann. A particularly notable achievement came in 1930 when he joined Eduard Imhof and Paul Nabholz in surveying Minya Konka, accurately measuring its height at 7,600 meters, dispelling previous claims of it being 10,000 meters tall.

=== Himalayan expeditions ===
Heim's most significant expedition was the first Swiss Himalaya expedition in 1936, which he led with Augusto Gansser. The eight-month journey resulted in two seminal works: the travelogue "Thron der Götter" (Throne of the Gods) (1938) and the scientific publication "Central Himalaya: Geological Observations of the Swiss Expedition 1936" (1939). These works combined detailed scientific observations with comprehensive geological analysis of the region.

== Death ==
Heim died on 27 May 1965 in Zurich and was buried in the Sihlfeld Cemetery.

== Selected publications ==
- "Thron der Götter: Erlebnisse der ersten Schweizer Himalaja-Expedition" (with Augusto Gansser, 1938)
- "Weltbild eines Naturforschers: Mein Bekenntnis" (4th revised edition, 1948)
- "Wunderland Peru. Naturerlebnisse" (1948, 2nd edition 1957)
- "Südamerika. Naturerlebnisse auf Reisen in Chile, Argentinien und Bolivien" (2nd edition, 1954)
