= Marie Heim-Vögtlin =

Swiss doctor (1845–1916)

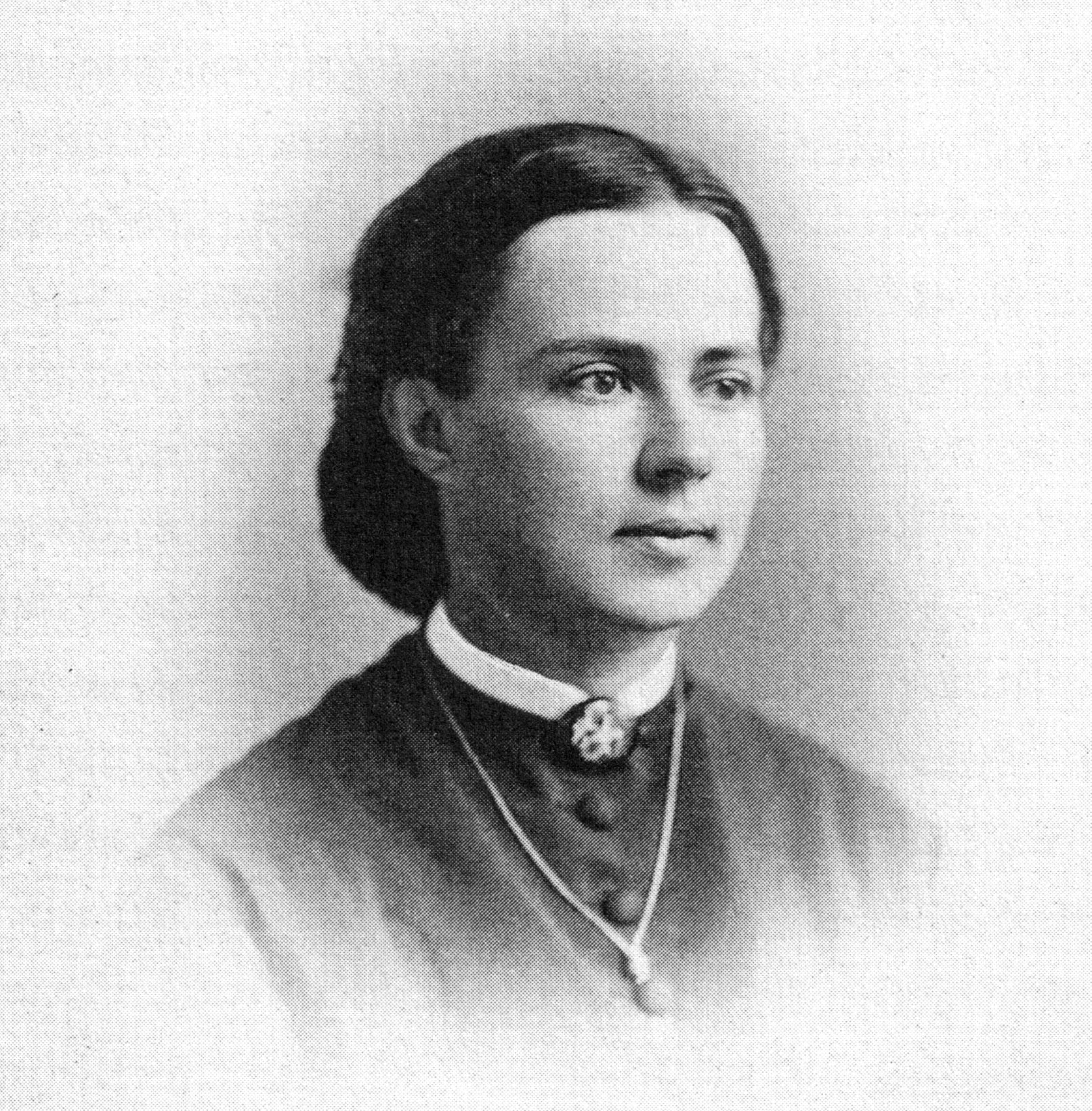
- Born: 7 October 1845; Bözen, Switzerland
- Died: 7 November 1916 (aged 71)
- Education: University of Zürich
- Spouse: Albert Heim
- Children: 2 including Arnold Heim
- Medical career
- Profession: Gynecologist
- Institutions: Schweizerische Pflegerinnenschule mit Spital

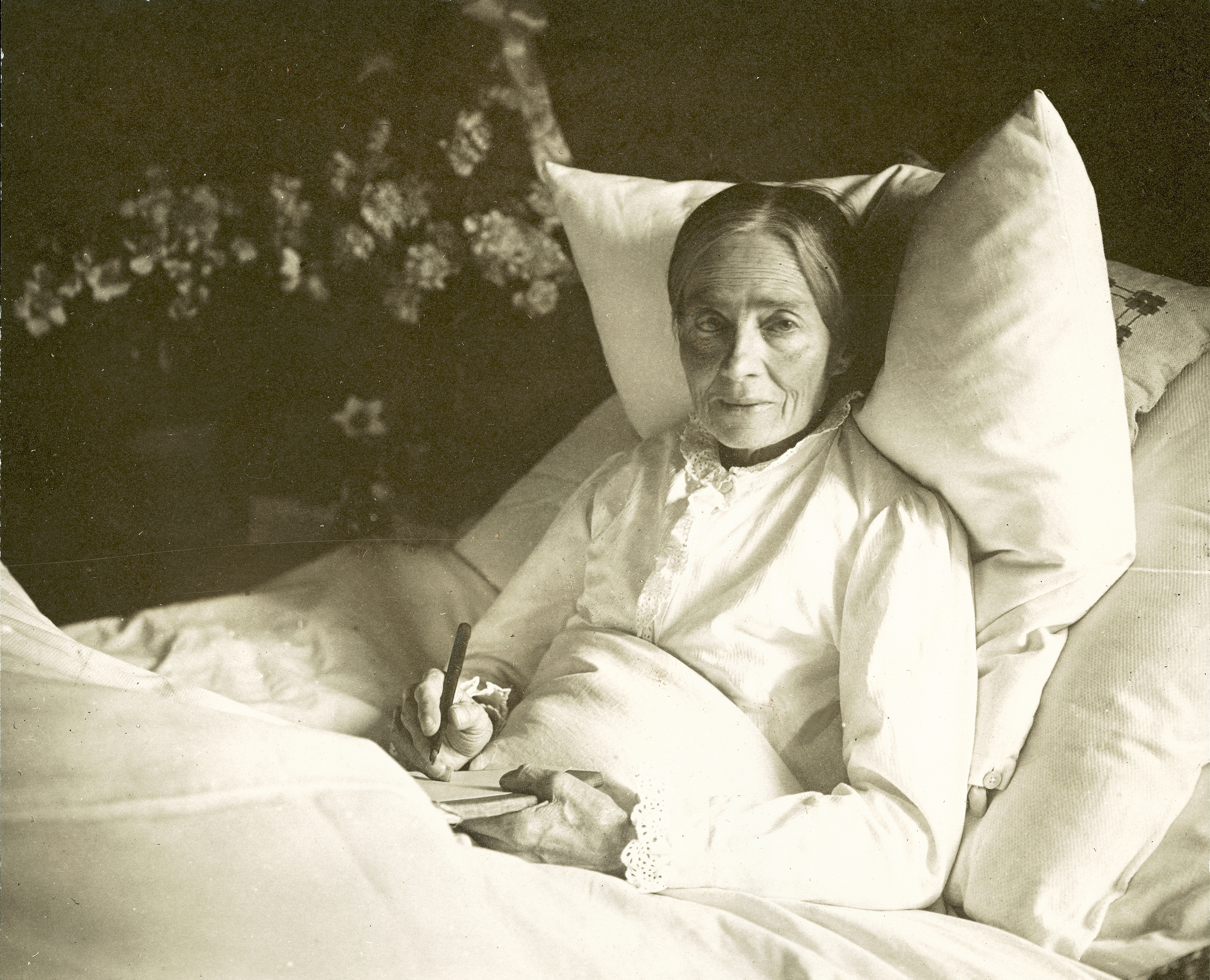
Marie Heim-Vögtlin in 1915

Marie Heim-Vögtlin (7 October 1845 – 7 November 1916) was the first female Swiss physician, a writer and a co-founder of the first Swiss gynaecological hospital.

== Education ==
Born as the daughter of the pastor of Bözen, Vögtlin benefited from a private education in the Romandie and in Zürich. In 1867, her fiancé, a student of medicine, broke off the engagement. He married Nadezhda Suslova, Europe's first female physician, instead. In response and with the reluctant support of her father, Vögtlin applied for admission herself to the study of medicine at the University of Zürich, which had been the first medical faculty in Europe to admit women. This caused a national scandal, as previously, only a few "impudent" foreign women such as Suslova had been matriculated there.

At the university, Vögtlin and her few fellow women students benefited from particular support by the faculty, even as many conservatives decried the medical education of women as shameful, and as a waste of time. After Vögtlin passed the examinations with honours, she studied gynaecology in Leipzig and worked in a Dresden maternity ward. On 11 July 1874 she attained her doctorate in Zürich with a dissertation on the topic of the state of the female genitalia in labour. It required the intervention of her father for her to obtain an official permission to practice medicine in Zürich.

== Professional and family life ==
Although her practice had few clients at first, Vögtlin soon acquired a reputation as a capable and well-liked physician, and was particularly noted for her generosity towards poor women.

In 1875, she married the noted geologist Albert Heim after he had given his permission (as required by law at that time) for her to continue working after marriage. The couple had two children, Arnold and Helene, and also cared for a foster child. In 1916, Heim-Vögtlin died in Zürich of a lung disease.

== Social activism ==
Heim-Vögtlin was a co-founder of the Schweizerische Pflegerinnenschule mit Spital, Switzerland's first gynaecological hospital, which also featured a maternity ward and nurses' school. After the school opened in 1901, she served as its bursar. She was an active participant in the women's suffrage and temperance movements and published several works, mostly popular writings for women and children.

== Honours ==
The Swiss National Science Foundation (SNSF) has named a women's scholarship in Heim-Vögtlin's honour. In 1995, a lane near the Zürich women's hospital was named after her. In 2010, Heim-Vögtlin's work was honoured by the Gesellschaft zu Fraumünster. In 2016, the hundredth anniversary of her death is commemorated with a Swiss Post stamp.
