= Qeertartivatsiaq Island =

Island in Sermersooq, Greenland

Qeertartivatsiaq
- Interactive map of Qeertartivatsiaq

Geography
- Location: North Atlantic
- Coordinates: 65°51′N 38°05′W
- Length: 6.9 km (4.29 mi)
- Width: 5.4 km (3.36 mi)
- Highest elevation: 411 m (1348 ft)

Administration
- Greenland
- Municipality: Sermersooq

Qeertartivatsiaq Island (old spelling: Qêrtartivatsiaq) is an uninhabited island in the Sermersooq municipality in southeastern Greenland.

== Geography ==
Qeertartivatsiaq lies near the entrance of Sermilik Fjord on the western side, at the mouth of Johan Petersen Fjord and its eastern branch, the Stoklund Fjord which lies between the northwestern side of Qeertartivatsiaq and the mainland.

The island is located in King Christian IX Land to the southwest of Tiniteqilaaq, and to the west of Ammassalik Island.

== See also ==
- List of islands of Greenland
