= Schweizerland =

Mountain range in eastern Greenland

- Schweizerland Alps
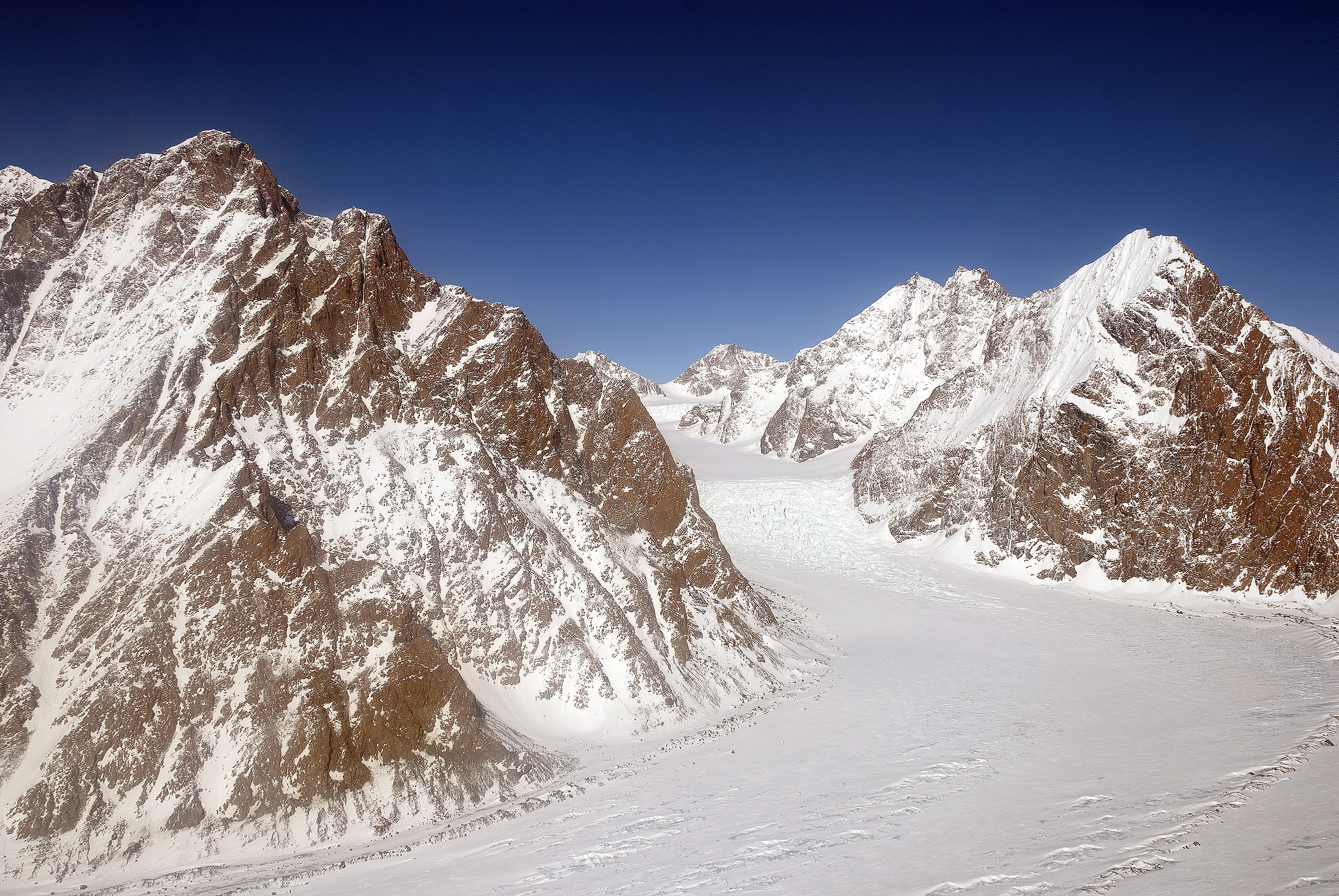
- View of the mountains rising above the Midgard Glacier at the southern end of the range

Highest point
- Peak: Mont Forel
- Elevation: 3,383 m (11,099 ft)

Dimensions
- Length: 75 km (47 mi) N/S
- Width: 40 km (25 mi) E/W
- Area: 270 km^{2} (100 mi^{2})

Geography
- Location within Greenland
- Country: Greenland
- Range coordinates: 66°40′N 37°0′W

Schweizerland, also known as Schweizerland Alps, is a mountain range in King Christian IX Land, eastern Greenland. Administratively this range is part of the Sermersooq Municipality. Its highest point is one of the highest peaks in Greenland.

Owing to its high peaks Schweizerland is a popular climbing destination, together with the Watkins Range to the northeast and the Stauning Alps further north. Tasiilaq Heliport is located near the area of the range.

== History ==
The range was formerly a remote unknown area. It was named 'Schweizerland' in 1912 by Swiss geophysicist and Arctic explorer Alfred de Quervain following the Second Swiss Expedition in which he crossed the Greenland ice cap from Godhavn (Qeqertarsuaq) on the west, to Sermilik Fjord on the eastern side.

De Quervain also identified the position and approximate height of Mont Forel, highest point of Schweizerland. Mont Forel was then thought to be the highest mountain in the Arctic Circle area. However, at the time of the British Arctic Air Route Expedition led by Gino Watkins in 1930, Watkins discovered a new mountain range from the air located over 350 km to the northeast. This was the higher Watkins Range with the Gunnbjørnsfjeld, the actual highest summit in Greenland. An attempt to climb Mont Forel was made by Lawrence Wager and Alfred Stephenson in 1931 but the mountaineers were stopped by the ice dome at the top of the mountain.

In the years that followed, Watkins' 1932–33 East Greenland expedition, the 1934 British Trans-Greenland Expedition with Lindsay, Croft and Lieutenant Arthur Godfrey of the Royal Engineers – which mapped the much larger Crown Prince Frederick Range to the northeast, and the 1936–37 Paul-Émile Victor Expedition visited Schweizerland. All these expeditions carried out surveys in the little-known mountainous region, the latter taking a great number of photographs and sketches. Mont Forel would be finally climbed in the same decade by an expedition of the Akademischer Alpen-Club of Zürich led by André Roch in 1938.

== Geography ==
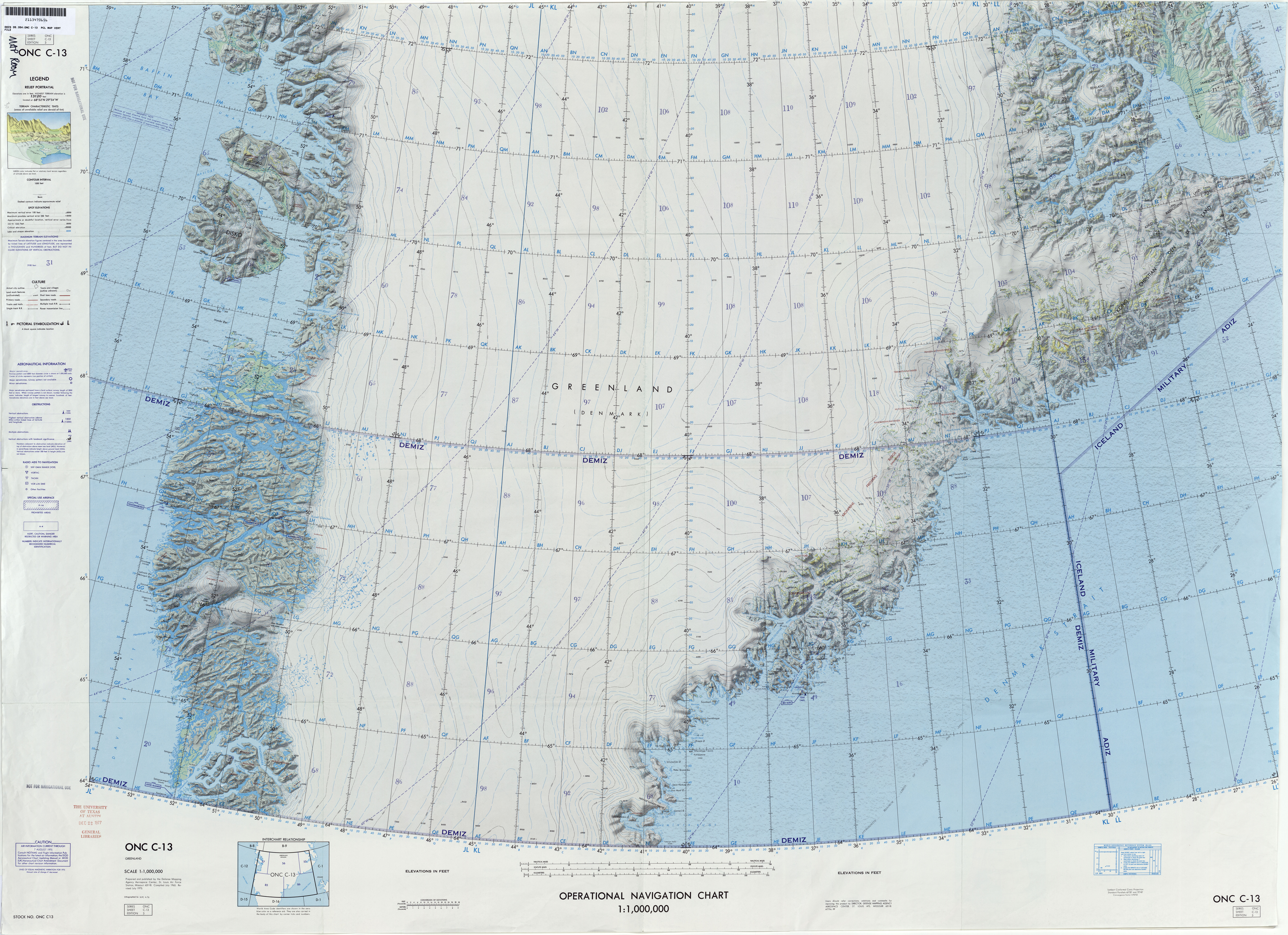
Defense Mapping Agency map of Greenland sheet

The Schweizerland Range is a mountain system bound by the Greenland ice sheet to the north, the northern shore of the Sermilik Fjord system to the south and the Fenris Glacier to the west. Although its eastern limits are not well defined, there are two distinct regions in the range, one located in the south, roughly between the Jura Glacier (Juragletscheren) and the Midgard Glacier, and the other in the north limited by the ice cap at its northern end and the upper reaches of the K.J.V. Steenstrup Glacier to the southeast. The Arctic Circle passes through the southern part of the range.

Schweizerland is highly glaciated, containing many active glaciers and nunataks, and its topography is very pronounced. The highest point of the range is 3,383 m high Mont Forel, located in the northern region of Schweizerland. Døren is a 1,929 m high mountain pass near Mont Forel. The Crown Prince Frederick Range stretches northeastwards to the northeast of Mont Forel.

The area of the mountain range is uninhabited, but Tasiilaq, the most populous community on the eastern coast of Greenland, is relatively near.

=== Mountains ===
The highest peak in Schweizerland is Mont Forel located at the northern limit. Quite a few of the features and peaks in and near the range are very well known among mountaineers; among these the Fox Jaw Cirque at the southern end, as well as the Rytterknaegten and the Trillingerne deserve mention. Certain peaks such as the ca 3,250 m high Perfeknunatak have only recently been named and some are yet unnamed. Gaule Bjerg is a 2,133 m high isolated peak located in a nunatak to the northwest, off the main area of the range.

- Mont Forel (3,383 m)
- Henri-Dunant Bjerg (2,744 m)
- Jomfruen (2,744 m), a nunatak
- Dobbelthætten (2,640 m), a ridge
- Paddenhatten (2,446 m), a nunatak
- Nordposten (2,202 m), a nunatak
- Avantgarden (2,160 m), a ridge
- Sydposten (2,106 m), a nunatak
- Medet (2,106 m), a nunatak
- Bredekuppel (2,029 m)
- Guldnålene (1,724 m), a nunatak
- Quervain Bjerg (1,558 m), a nunatak
- Lauper Bjerg (1,537 m), a nunatak
- Charcot Fjelde (837 m), located at the southern end

== Bibliography ==
- Becher, Gianni Pais (1990). "Greenland, Peaks above Fenrisgletscher, Schweizerland, East Greenland". Climbs And Expeditions. American Alpine Journal. 32 (64). American Alpine Club: 184. ISBN 0-930410-43-2.
- Buoy observations from the windiest location in the world ocean, Cape Farewell, Greenland

== See also ==
- List of mountain ranges of Greenland
- Paul Walker (Arctic explorer)
