= Hutchinson Glacier =

Glacier in Greenland

- Hutchinson Gletscher
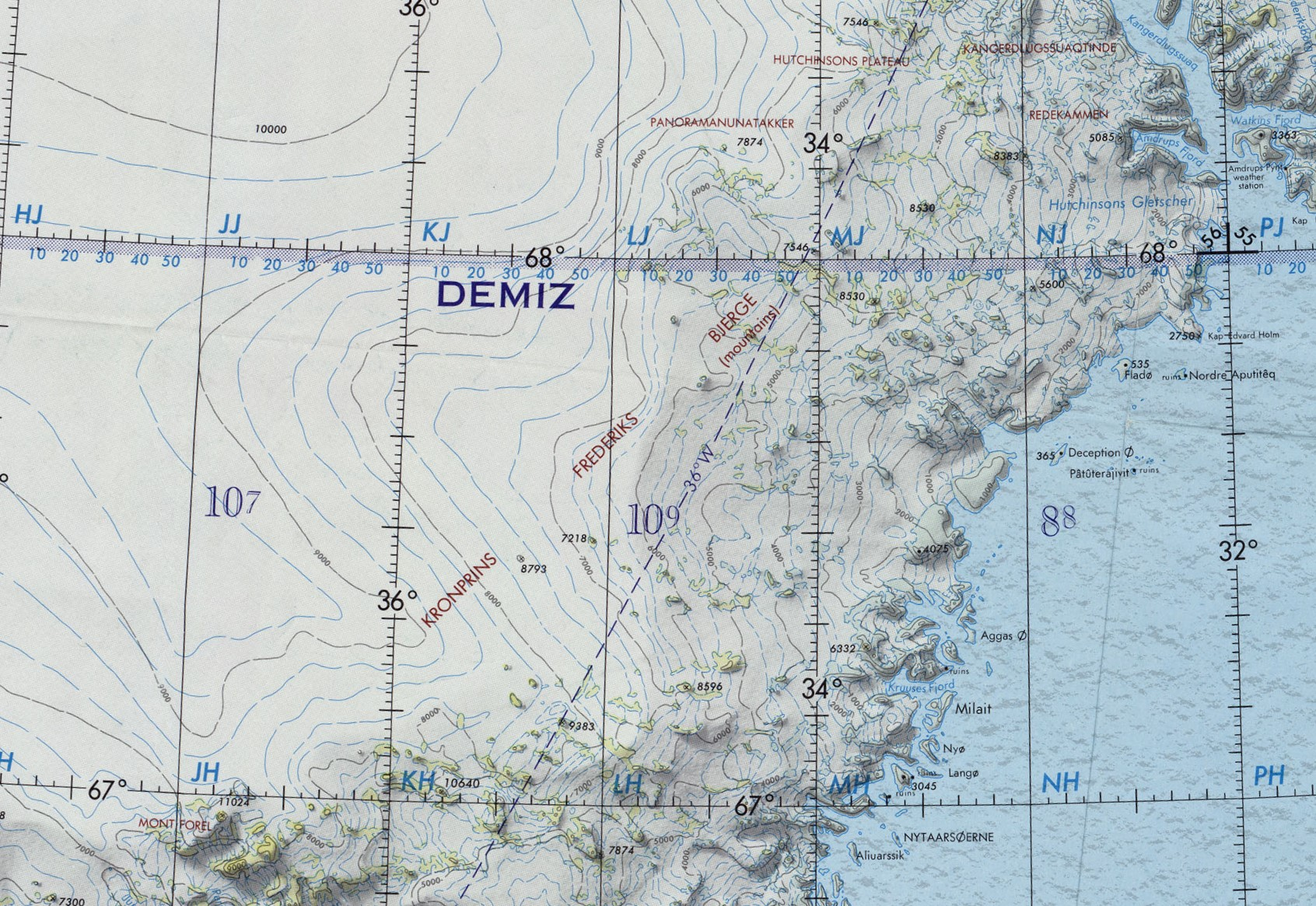
- Crown Prince Frederick Range map section with the Hutchinson Glacier in the northeast

- Location within Greenland
- Location: Sermersooq, Greenland
- Coordinates: 68°7′N 32°55′W
- Terminus: Kangerlussuaq Fjord, North Atlantic Ocean

The Hutchinson Glacier (Danish: Hutchinson Gletscher) is a large active glacier on the east coast of the Greenland ice sheet.

This glacier was named after American aviator George R. Hutchinson who crash-landed and was stranded in the area in 1932 during an attempted around-the-world flight with his family and was rescued and brought to Ammasalik by a fishing trawler.

== Geography ==
The Hutchinson Glacier flows north of the Crown Prince Frederick Range from the Hutchinson Plateau in the northwest in a roughly eastern direction with an average elevation of 1,050 m (3,440 ft).

The terminus of the glacier is in the southern side of the mouth of the Kangerlussuaq Fjord, the second largest fjord in East Greenland.

This glacier is located in the Sermersooq municipality.

== See also ==
- List of glaciers in Greenland
- List of fjords of Greenland
