= Helheim Glacier =

Glacier in Greenland

- Helheim Gletscher
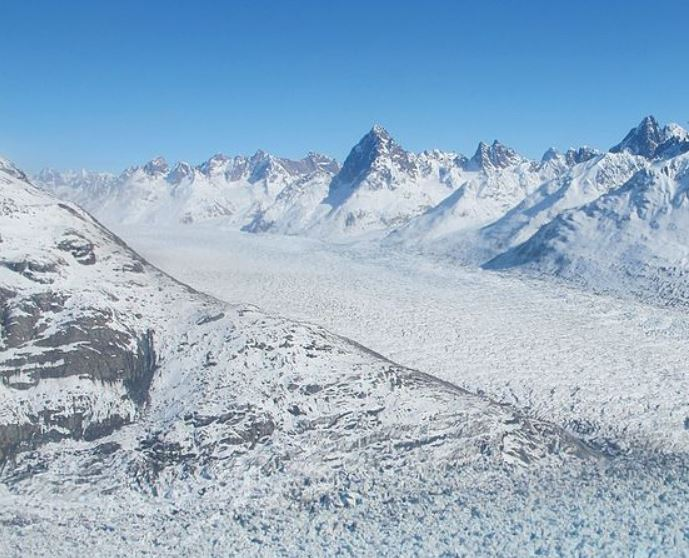
- View of the Helheim Glacier

- Location within Greenland
- Location: Sermersooq, Greenland
- Coordinates: 66°21′N 38°12′W
- Terminus: Helheim Fjord, Sermilik, North Atlantic Ocean

Helheim Glacier is a glacier in the Sermersooq municipality, Eastern Greenland.

This glacier's name is derived from "Helheim", a modern term for a world of the dead in Old Norse religion: Hel.

== Geography ==
The Helheim Glacier is located on the eastern side of the Greenland ice sheet. It is one of Greenland's largest outlet glaciers. It flows roughly in an ESE direction and feeds the waters of the Helheim Fjord, a branch at the northern end of the Sermilik (Danish: Egede og Rothes Fjord) system, where there are a number of other glaciers calving and discharging at rapid rates such as the Fenris and the Midgard Glacier.

== Retreat ==
Helheim Glacier accelerated from 8 km (5.0 mi) per year in 2000 to 11 km (6.8 mi) per year in 2005. Like many of Greenland's outlet glaciers, it is a common site where glacial earthquakes are monitored.

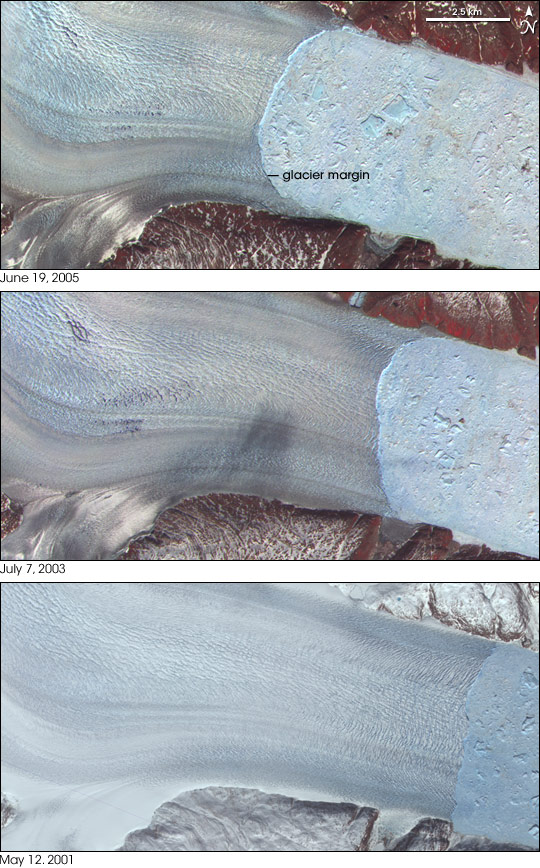
Retreat of Greenland's Helheim Glacier from 2001 to 2005

== See also ==
- List of glaciers in Greenland
