= André Roch =

Swiss mountain climber (1906–2002)

André Roch (21 August 1906 in Hermance, Switzerland – 19 November 2002 in Geneva) was a Swiss mountaineer, avalanche researcher and expert, skier, resort developer, engineer, and author. Roch is best known for having planned and surveyed the Aspen, Colorado, ski resort, and also as an adviser on avalanche management whose expertise was sought throughout the world.

== Early life ==
Roch was born near Geneva, Switzerland, in 1906, the son of an academic physician who would later become the president of the University of Geneva. He was introduced to mountain sports by his father, who was an avid climber, and he learned to ski at an early age. He won both the downhill and the slalom races at the 1927 Student Olympics in Italy. In his youth he traveled and pursued university education in the United States.

== Mountaineering accomplishments ==
Roch became a member of the Swiss Alpine Club in 1928 and later became the president of its Geneva section. While a university student at Reed College in Oregon in 1931, Roch was a member of the Cascade Ski Club. On 26 April 1931 Roch, together with two fellow members of the Cascade Ski Club, Hjalmar Hvam and Arne Stene, became the first to descend on skis from the summit of Mount Hood.

Beginning in 1931, Roch made the first ascent of many routes in the Mont Blanc Massif. Over the course of his life, Roch made 25 first ascents in the Alps and 27 first ascents in Asia. Mont Forel in Schweizerland, East Greenland was first climbed by a Swiss expedition led by André Roch in 1938.

In 1952, at the age of 45, he was the most experienced member of a group of four Swiss climbers who, along with Tenzing Norgay, pioneered the route on Mount Everest which Edmund Hillary and Tenzing Norgay used to reach the summit the following year. Two members of the 1952 expedition, Raymond Lambert and Norgay, reached to within 200 meters (656 feet) of the summit before being forced to turn back due to severe weather conditions and lack of oxygen.

He last climbed in the Himalayas at age 84. Roch drew on these experiences to publish more than a dozen books on mountaineering.

== Avalanche expert ==
Roch joined the Swiss Federal Institute for Snow and Avalanche Research in the late 1930s and became head of the section on snow and avalanche mechanics and avalanche control. During this period, Roch published many scientific articles on avalanche prediction, snow pack evaluation, and glaciation. Roch contributed to advances in avalanche safety in the Alps, in Scotland, and in the US. He was the first to describe the different types of snow pack that occur in the United States, and it was his lectures and published papers that prompted the US Forest Service to set up facilities at several western sites to study avalanche safety and prevention.

Over the course of his career, he was a consultant on avalanche issues to private corporations, government agencies and courts in various countries.

His experience with avalanches extended beyond scientific observation, as he was personally caught in an avalanche on three occasions, and also was skiing with his son when his son was swept away by an avalanche. After he and his son had survived these events, his best-known quote became "The avalanche does not know that you are an expert."

== Aspen resort development ==
Andre Roch Skiing, by Fritz Kaeser (gift of Milly Kaeser) Raclin Murphy Museum of Art

By 1936, Roch was already renowned as an expert on avalanche prediction, and also as a climbing guide. Colorado investors, Ted Ryan, and two-time Olympic bobsled gold-medalist Billy Fiske consequently hired Roch to come to Aspen, Colorado, to assist in development of a ski resort. Roch conducted a survey of Hayden Peak, and laid out trails for the resort that remains at Aspen today. While in the valley, he gave ski lessons and helped form what later became the Aspen Ski Club, (known today as the Aspen Valley Ski and Snowboard Club). The first ski trail, Roch Run, opened in 1937, but while awaiting further funding, World War II broke out and development halted. When the resort opened in 1946, a ski racing trophy, the Roch Cup, was awarded to the winner of the combined downhill and slalom race at Aspen. This trophy commemorating Roch has been won at various times by noted skiers including Billy Kidd, Franz Klammer and A. J. Kitt.

== Personal life ==
Roch was married twice. He had three children – one son and two daughters – with his wife Emilie Dollfus. Roch suffered personal tragedy when one of his daughters, along with her friend, were killed in a climbing accident in 1962. This accident would have taken Roch's life as well if a rope connecting him to his daughter had not broken.

== Filmography ==
- Demon of the Himalayas (1934)
