= Gaule Bjerg =

Mountain in Sermersooq, Greenland

- Location within Greenland

Highest point
- Elevation: 2,133 m (6,998 ft)
- Listing: List of mountains in Greenland
- Coordinates: 66°55′35″N 38°11′19″W

Geography
- Location: King Christian IX Land, Greenland
- Parent range: Schweizerland

Climbing
- First ascent: Possibly unclimbed

Gaule Bjerg is a mountain in King Christian IX Land, Sermersooq Municipality, Greenland.

There is little information about this mountain.

== Geography ==
Gaule Bjerg is an isolated nunatak located north of the Fenris Glacier, west of the northern end of the Schweizerland Range. Its elevation is 2,133 metres (6,998 ft). This mountain is marked as a 7,218-foot-high (2,200 m) peak in the Defense Mapping Agency Greenland Navigation charts.

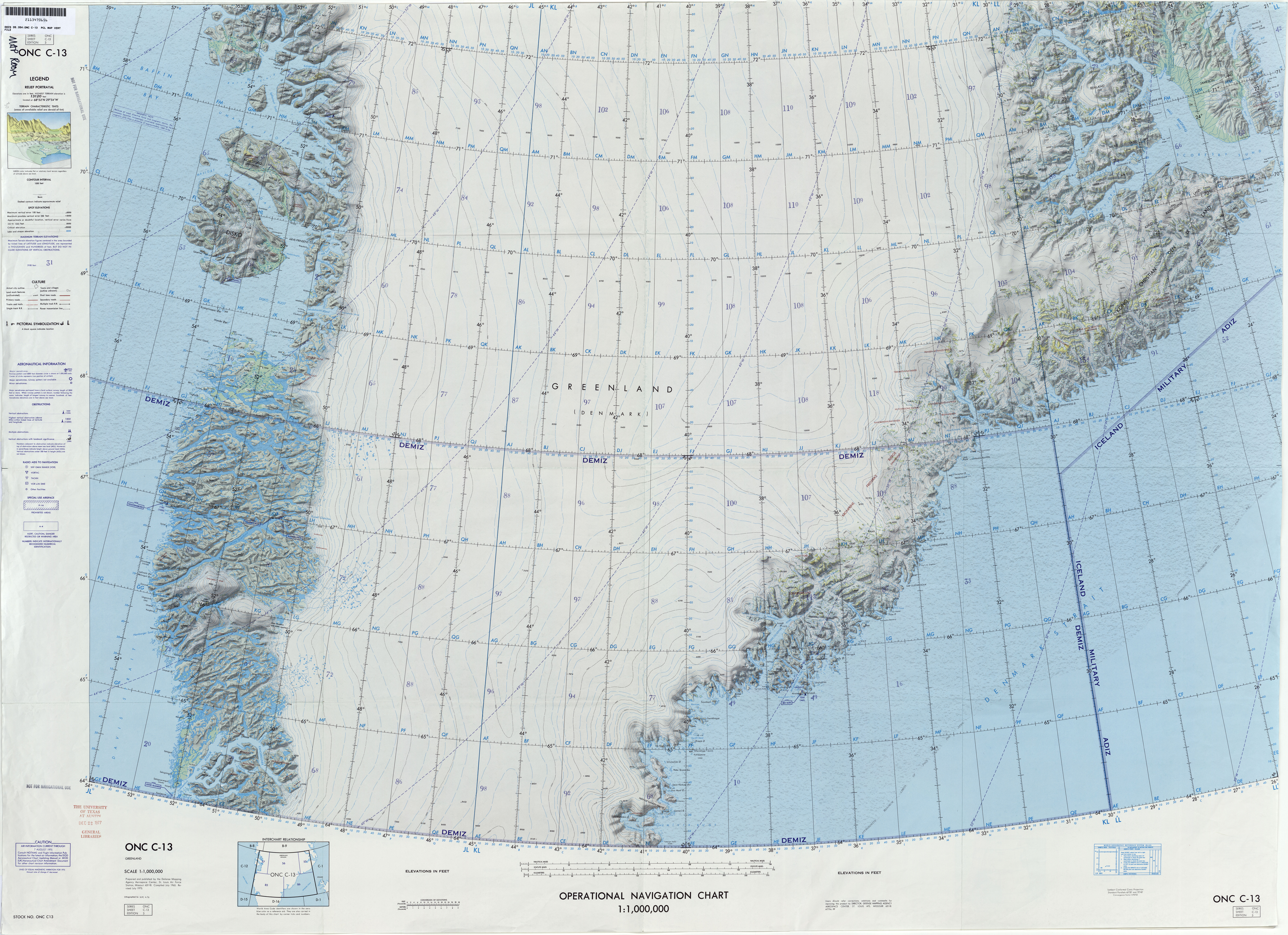
Defense Mapping Agency map of Greenland sheet.

== See also ==
- List of nunataks of Greenland
