= Kangersivartikajik =

Fjord in Greenland

- Kangerdluarssikajik
- Location in Greenland
- Location: East Greenland
- Coordinates: 65°59′N 36°16′W
- Ocean/sea sources: North Atlantic Ocean
- Basin countries: Greenland
- Max. length: 9 km (5.6 mi)
- Max. width: 1.5 km (0.93 mi)

Kangersivartikajik, old spelling Kangerdluarssikajik, meaning "The bad little fjord," is a fjord in Eastern Greenland.

== Geography ==
This fjord is located east of Sermilik (Sermiligaaq) in King Christian IX Land, north of Tasiilaq (Ammassalik). It runs from north to south for about 9 km. Sammileq (Sammilik) Fjord branches roughly northeastwards on the eastern side of its mouth. Leif Island is located to the south.

== Bibliography ==
- Spencer Apollonio, Lands That Hold One Spellbound: A Story of East Greenland, 2008

== See also ==
- List of fjords of Greenland
