= Fenris Glacier =

Glacier in Greenland

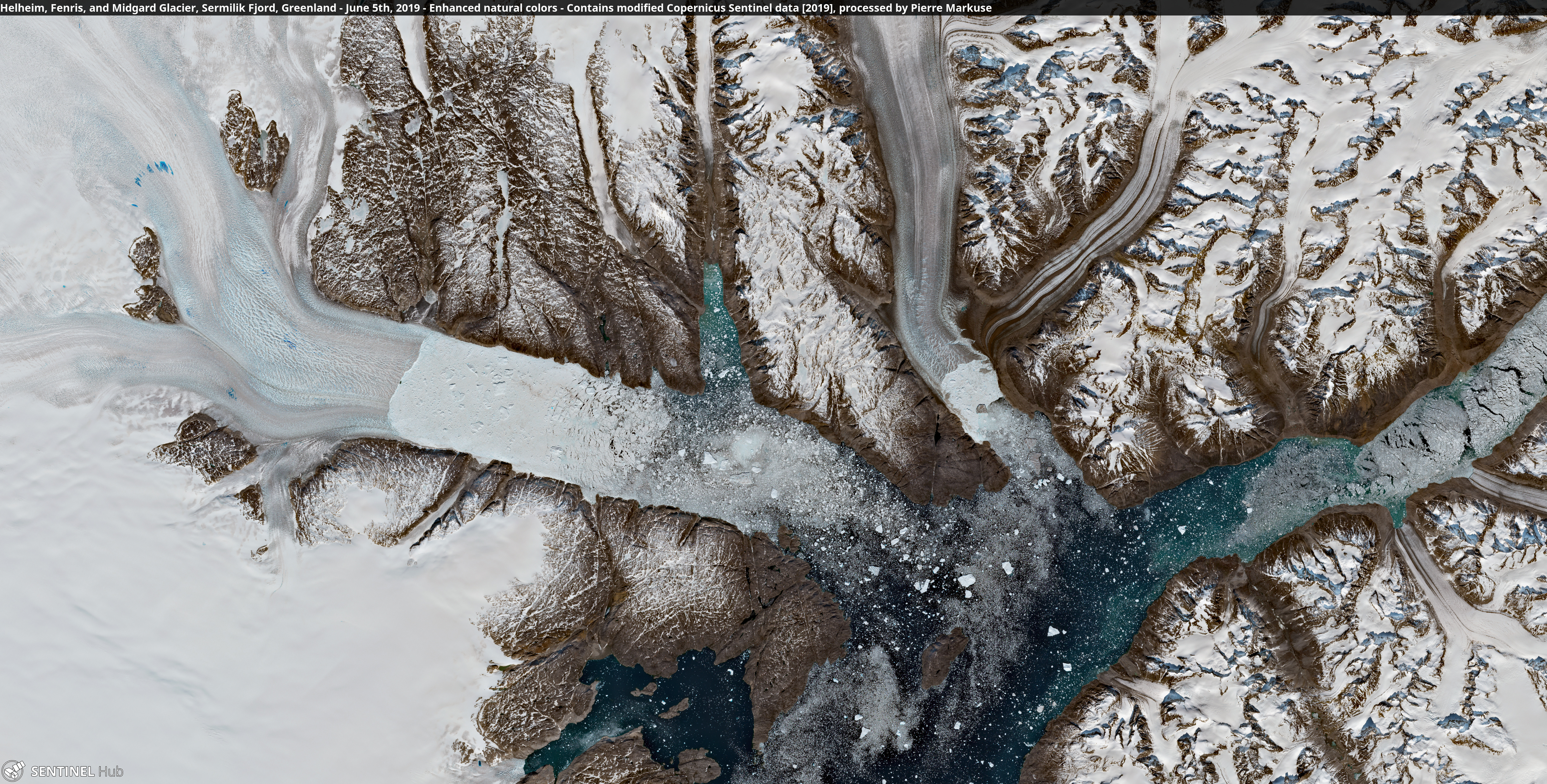
- View of the Helheim, Fenris, and Midgard glaciers at the northern end of Sermilik Fjord.

- Location within Greenland
- Location: Greenland
- Coordinates: 66°29′N 37°38′W
- Terminus: Ningerti; Sermilik, North Atlantic Ocean

Fenris Glacier (Danish: Fenrisgletscher) is a glacier in the Sermersooq municipality, Eastern Greenland.

This glacier is named after Fenris (Fenrir), the mighty wolf of Norse mythology.

== Geography ==
The Fenris Glacier is located on the eastern side of the Greenland ice sheet, forming the boundary of the western and southwestern area of Schweizerland. It flows roughly southwards from the area of Gaule Bjerg, west of the Midgard Glacier and northeast of the Helheim Glacier. Its terminus is at the mouth of the Ningerti, one of the northernmost branches of Sermilik (Egede og Rothes Fjord), a large fjord system.

== See also ==
- List of glaciers in Greenland
