= Midgard Glacier =

Glacier in Greenland

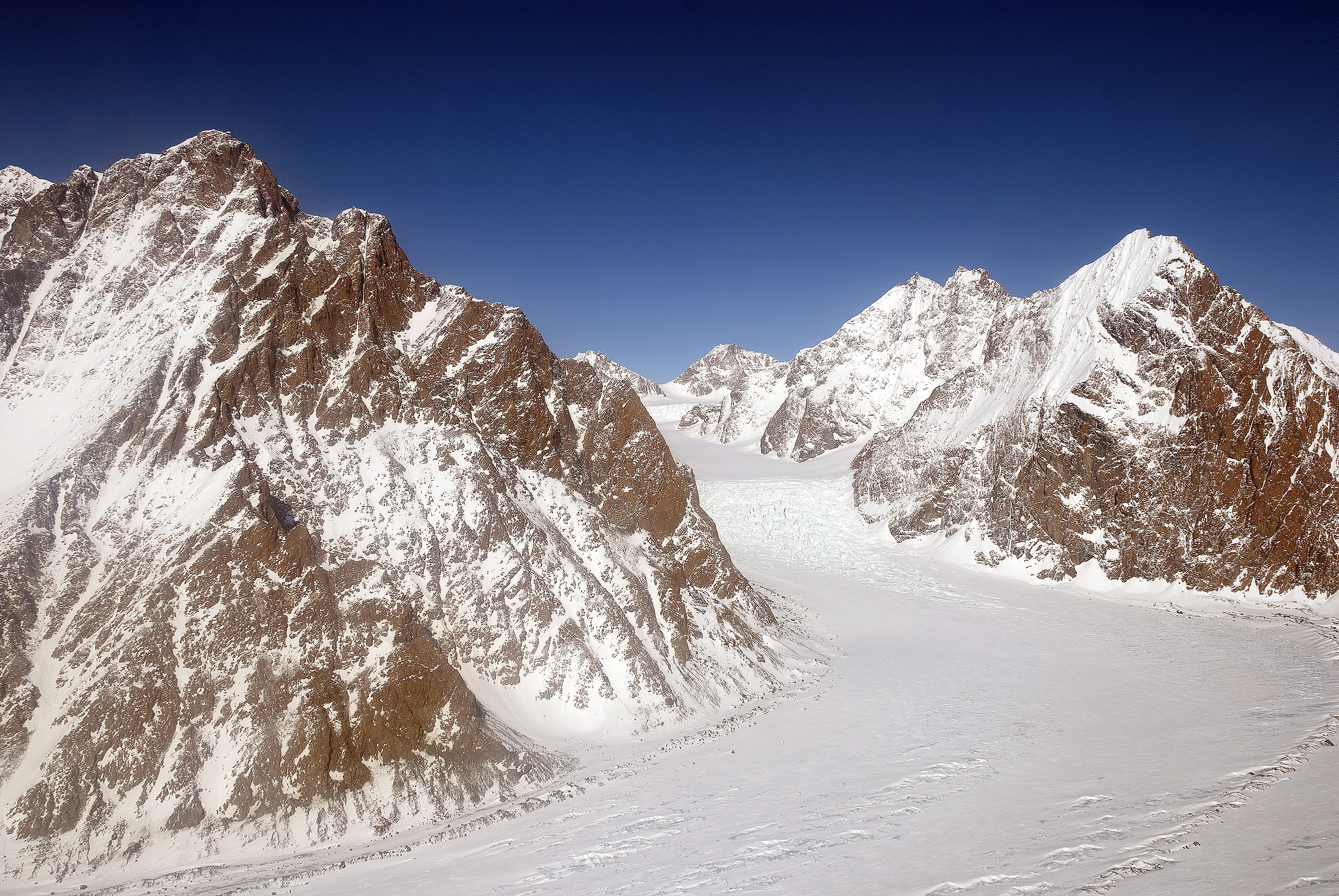
- View of the Midgard Glacier.

- Location within Greenland
- Location: Greenland
- Coordinates: 66°23′N 36°53′W
- Terminus: Ningerti; Sermilik, North Atlantic Ocean

Midgard Glacier (Danish: Midgårdsgletscher) is a glacier in the Sermersooq municipality, Eastern Greenland.

This glacier is named after Midgard, one of the Nine Worlds in Norse mythology.

== Geography ==
The Midgard Glacier is located on the eastern side of the Greenland ice sheet, at the southern limit of Schweizerland. It flows from the Femstjernen in the NE, just east of the Fenris Glacier. Its terminus is in the Ningerti, one of the northernmost branches of Sermilik (Egede og Rothes Fjord), a large fjord system where there are a number of other glaciers discharging such as the Helheim Glacier.

In 2019, it was revealed by NASA that the Midgard glacier has retreated approximately 16 kilometers since 1972 according to images from the Landsat program.

== See also ==
- List of glaciers in Greenland
