= Albert Heim =

Swiss geologist (1849–1937)

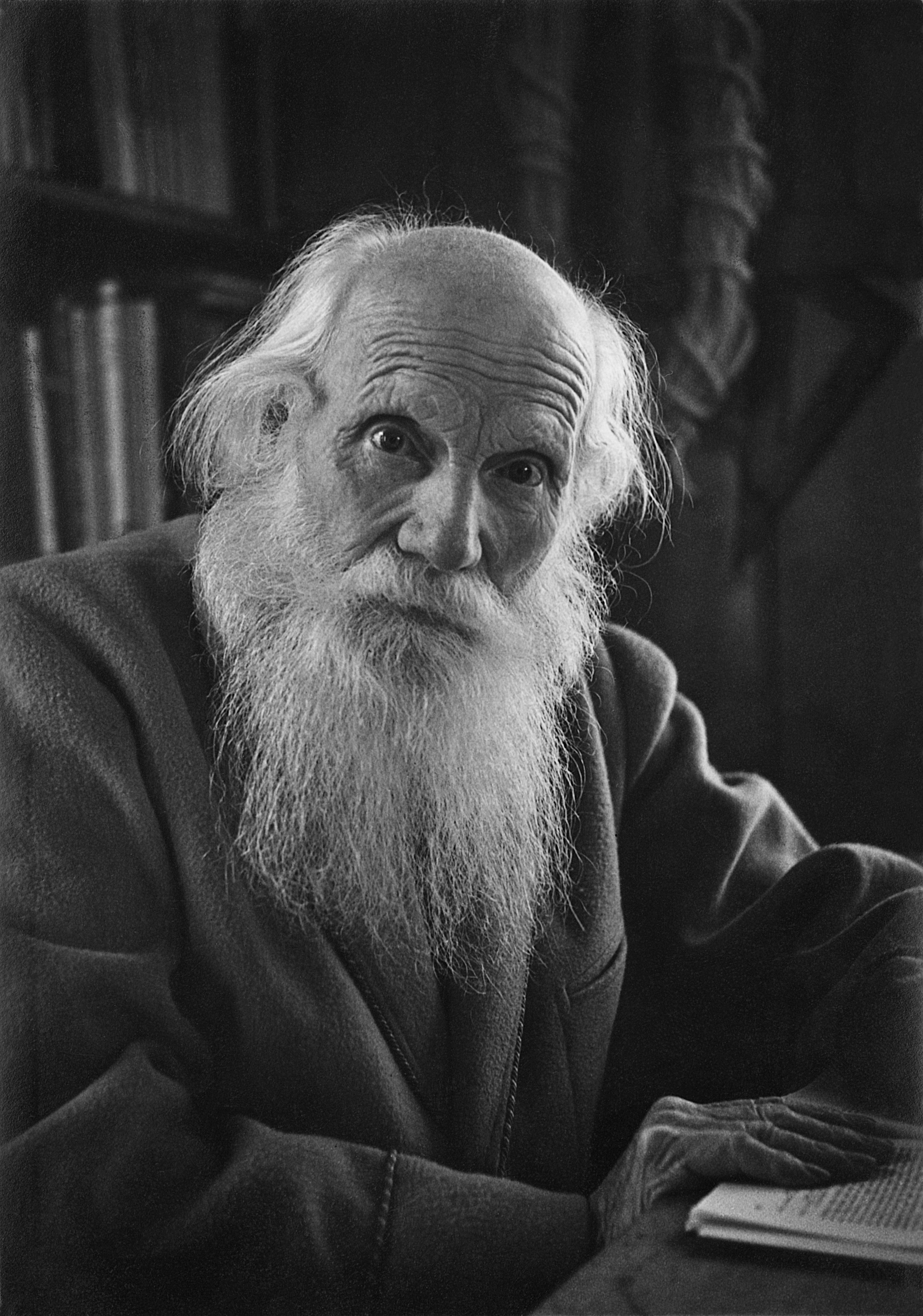
- Born: 12 April 1849; Zürich, Switzerland
- Died: 31 August 1937 (aged 88)
- Spouse: Marie Heim-Vögtlin (m. 1875; died 1916)
- Children: Arnold Heim
- Awards: Wollaston Medal (1904); Marcel Benoist Prize (1923); Foreign Member of the Royal Society
- Scientific career
- Fields: geology

Albert Heim (12 April 1849 – 31 August 1937) was a Swiss geologist, noted for his three-volume Geologie der Schweiz.

== Biography ==
Born in Zürich, he was educated at Zürich and Berlin universities. Very early in life he became interested in the physical features of the Alps, and at the age of sixteen he made a model of the Tödi group. This came to the notice of Arnold Escher von der Linth, to whom Heim was indebted for much encouragement and geological instruction in the field.

In 1873 he became professor of geology in the polytechnic school at Zürich, and in 1875 professor of geology in the university. In the same year he married Marie Heim-Vögtlin, Switzerland's first woman physician. In 1882 he was appointed director of the Geological Survey of Switzerland, and in 1884 the honorary degree of PhD was conferred upon him at the University of Berne.

He was especially distinguished for his researches on the structure of the Alps and for the light thereby thrown on the structure of mountain masses in general. He traced the plications from minor to major stages, and illustrated the remarkable foldings and overthrust faultings in numerous sections and with the aid of pictorial drawings. His initial misinterpretation of the Glarus Alps as resulting entirely from folding rather than from a major thrust fault, an error which he acknowledged in 1901, did not detract measurably from his considerable contributions.

His work, Mechanismus der Gebirgsbildung (1878), is now regarded as a classic, and it served to inspire Professor C Lapworth in his brilliant researches on the Scottish Highlands (see Geol. Mag. 1883). Heim also devoted considerable attention to the glacial phenomena of the Alpine regions. The Wollaston medal was awarded to him in 1904 by the Geological Society of London, and in 1905 he was made a member of the Royal Swedish Academy of Sciences.

A constant kinetic friction coefficient controlling the movement of pyroclastic flows and avalanches was named Heim coefficient after Albert Heim. The ridge Dorsum Heim on the Moon was also named after him.

In 1908, on the 25th anniversary of the founding of the Swiss Kennel Club, two short-haired Bernese Mountain Dogs were shown by Franz Schertenlieb to Heim, an advocate of the Swiss mountain dogs. Heim recognized them as representatives of the old, vanishing, large mountain dog, whose ancestors had been widely spread across Europe, and bred as guard dogs, draft dogs, and droving-cattle dogs.

Heim was a Sennenhund expert, and started to encourage breeders to take an interest in them. These efforts resulted in the re-establishment of the breed. In 1909, the dogs were recognized as a separate breed by the Swiss Kennel Club and entered as "Grosser Schweizer Sennenhund" in Volume 12 of the Swiss stud book. The first breed club was formed in 1912 to promote the Greater Swiss Mountain Dog. The Bernese Mountain Dog and the Greater Swiss Mountain Dog are two of four distinctive farm-type dogs of Swiss origin that were saved from extinction and revitalized by Schertenlieb in the late 1800s.
