= Sermilik =

Fjord in Greenland

- Egede og Rothes Fjord (Danish)
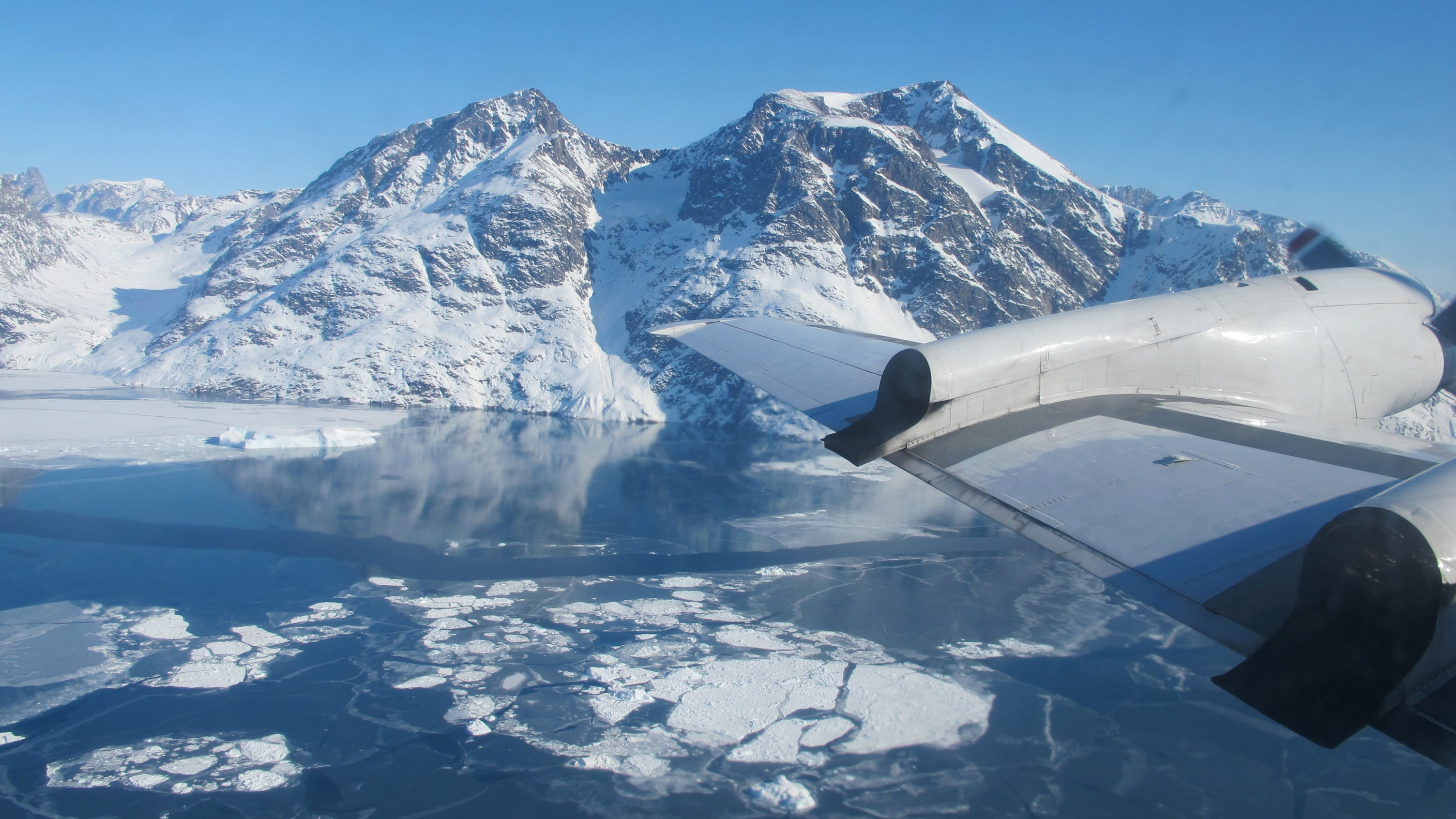
- Helheim Fjord, part of the Sermilik system.

- Location in Greenland
- Location: Arctic
- Coordinates: 66°0′N 37°52′W
- Ocean/sea sources: North Atlantic Ocean
- Basin countries: Greenland
- Max. length: 81 km (50 mi)
- Max. width: 14 km (8.7 mi)

Sermilik (Danish: Egede og Rothes Fjord) is a fjord in eastern Greenland. It is part of the Sermersooq municipality.

The settlement of Tasiilaq is located about 15 km to the east of the mouth of the fjord.

== Geography ==
Sermilik

This fjord, whose Greenlandic name 'Sermilik' means 'place with glaciers' is located at the southern end of King Christian IX Land, west of Ammassalik Fjord. It is one of the largest fjords in the southeastern coast of Greenland. Its waters are fed by the Helheim Glacier, Fenris Glacier and Midgard Glacier among others. The fjord stretches inland in a roughly northern direction and splits into two branches at its head —at the southern limit of Schweizerland, the western one being the Helheim Fjord and the right one the Ningerti.

Sermilik's mouth is located between Kitak Island and Cape Tycho Brahe in the Denmark Strait area of the Atlantic Ocean. Kangersivartikajik is the next fjord to the east along the coast. Near the fjord's entrance on the western side there is the island of Qeertartivatsiaq at the mouth of Johan Petersen Fjord and its eastern branch, the Stoklund Fjord. Sermilik is surrounded by jagged mountainous landscape and its coast is mostly very irregular and steep.

== History ==
Initially Fridtjof Nansen had thought that Sermilik would offer a route up to reach the ice cap for his projected westward overland crossing. On 3 June 1888 Nansen's party was picked up from the north-western Icelandic port of Ísafjörður by Norwegian sealer Jason. A week later the Greenland coast was sighted, but progress was hindered by thick pack ice. On 17 July, with the coast still 20 kilometres (12 mi) away, Nansen decided to launch the small boats; they were within sight of the Sermilik Fjord, which Nansen had deemed a good place to reach the ice sheet in order to cross it and reach Christianshåb.

The expedition left Jason "in good spirits and with the highest hopes of a fortunate result", according to Jason's captain. There followed days of extreme frustration for the party as, prevented by weather and sea conditions from reaching the shore, they drifted southwards with the ice. Most of this time was spent camping on the ice itself—it was too dangerous to launch the boats. By 29 July they were 380 kilometres (240 mi) south of the point where they had left the ship. On that day they finally reached land, but were too far south to begin the crossing. After a brief rest, Nansen ordered the team back into the boats and to begin rowing north. In the end Nansen finally began his crossing at Umivik Bay.

== Gallery ==
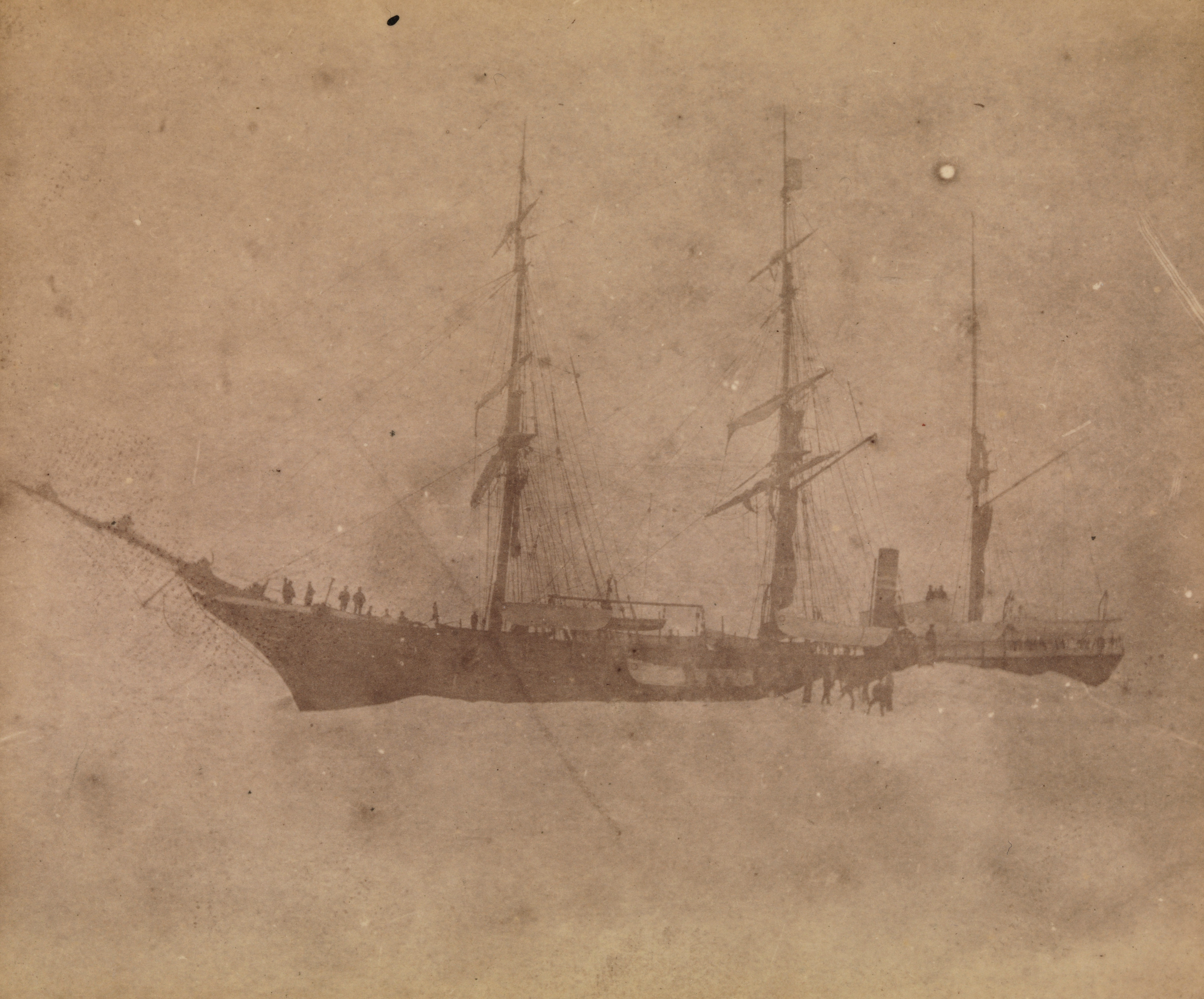
Seal hunting vessel Jason stuck in the ice off Sermilik in 1888. The ship had the members of the Greenland Expedition on board.

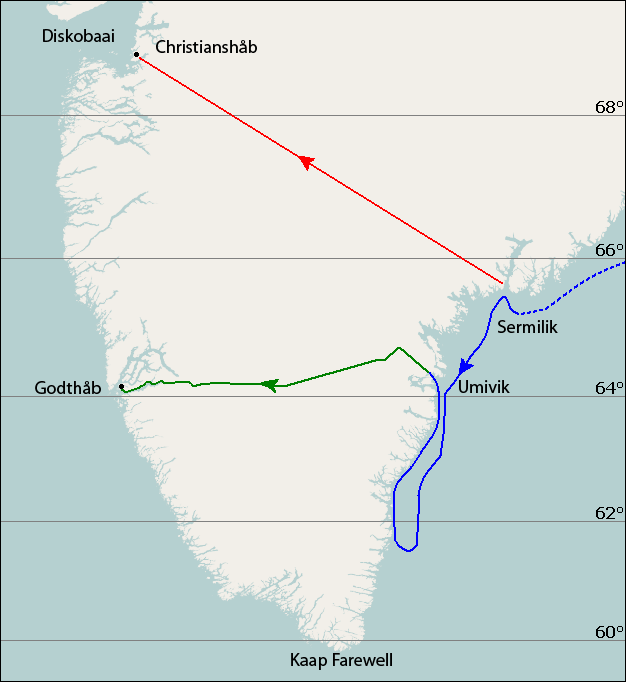
Nansen's 1888 route across Greenland showing Sermilik and Umivik in the east coast.

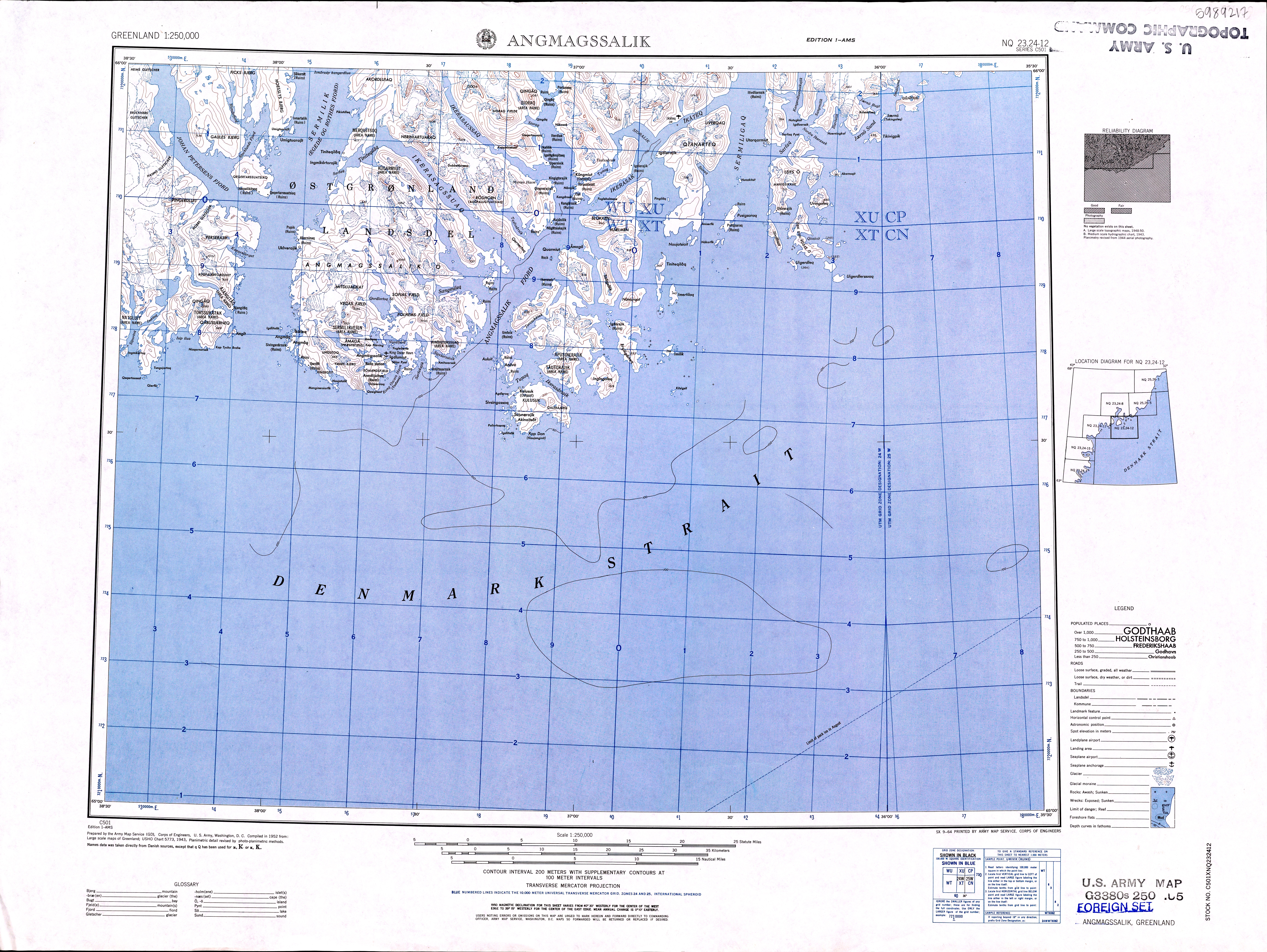
Map of Ammassalik Island with Sermilik in the left.

== See also ==
- List of fjords of Greenland
- Ammassalik Island
- Kristian Kristiansen (explorer)
- Sermilik Station
- Sermiligaaq

== Bibliography ==
- Bjarne Grønnow, Jens Fog Jensen (2003). The Northernmost Ruins of the Globe. Museum Tusculanum Press. ISBN 978-8763512626
- Mernild, S. H.; Liston, G. E.; Howat, I. M.; Ahn, Y.; Steffen, K.; Hasholt, B.; Jakobsen, B. H.; Fog, B.; van As, D., Freshwater flux to Sermilik Fjord, SE Greenland
- Huntford, Roland (2001). Nansen. London: Abacus. ISBN 0-349-11492-7. (First published in 1997 by Gerald Duckworth)
- Reynolds, E.E. (1949). Nansen. Harmondsworth (UK): Penguin Books.
