= Alfred de Quervain =

Swiss Arctic explorer and geophysicist

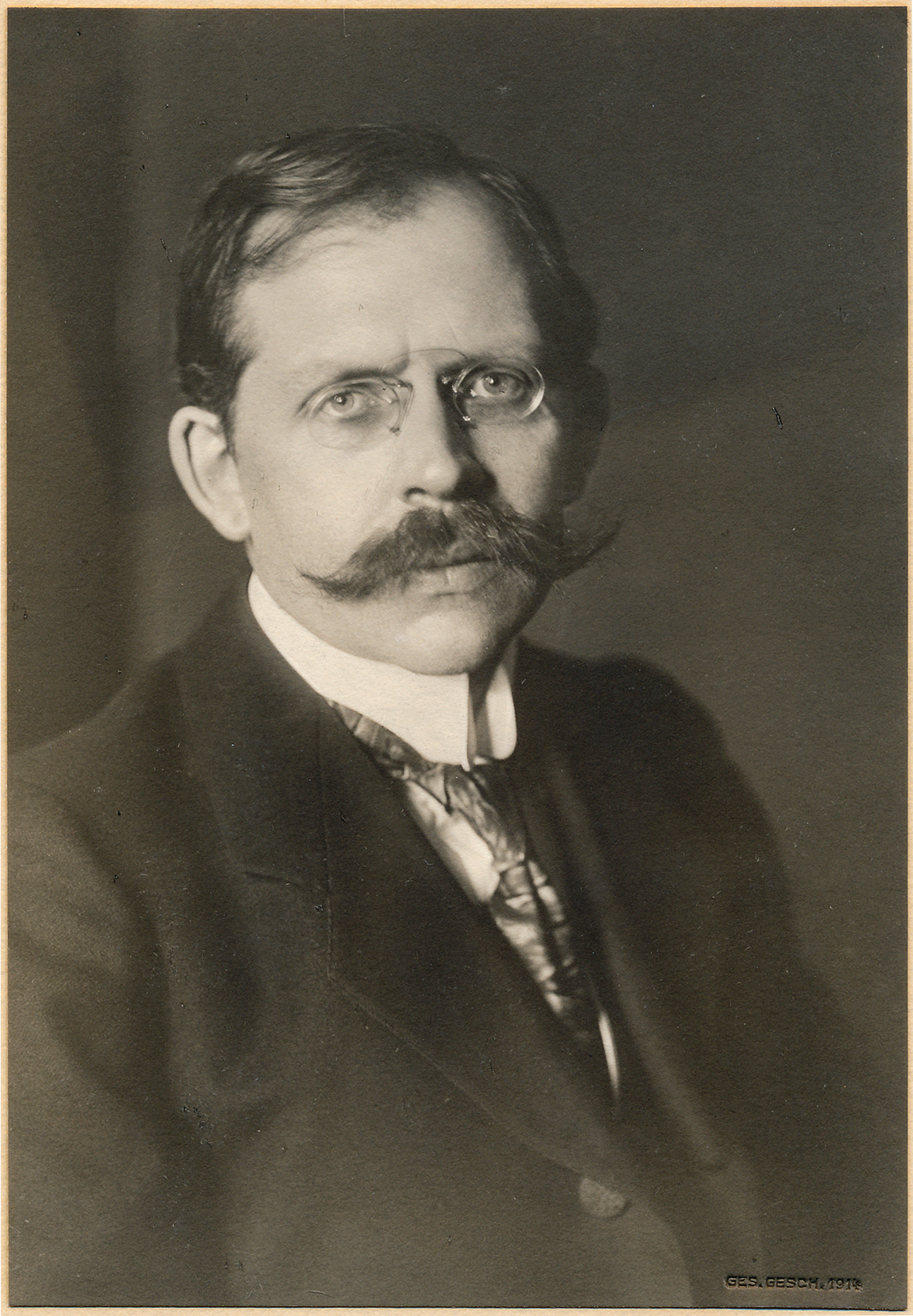
- Alfred de Quervain, 1914.
- Born: 15 June 1879; Uebeschi, Switzerland
- Died: 13 January 1927 (aged 47); Zürich, Switzerland
- Occupations: geophysicist, meteorologist
- Known for: exploration of Schweizerland
- Spouse: Elisabeth Nil (married 1911)
- Children: 2, incl. Marcel de Quervain
- Parent(s): Johann Friedrich de Quervain; Louise-Elise-Anne Girard
- Relatives: Fritz de Quervain (brother)

Alfred de Quervain (15 June 1879 – 13 January 1927) was a Swiss Arctic explorer and geophysicist.

== Biography ==
De Quervain was born in Uebeschi in the Swiss district of Thun. After completing his schooling in Bern, he studied geophysics and meteorology at the University of Bern from 1898. In early 1901, he investigated the winter temperatures of continental Europe by deploying sounding balloons in Russia. He earned a doctoral degree in 1902.

After working as an assistant at Neuchâtel Observatory, he was made Privatdozent for meteorology at the University of Strasbourg in 1905. From 1906, he was assistant director at the Central Meteorological Institute.

In 1909, de Quervain led an expedition to Greenland. From Ikerasak, E. Bäbler and A. Stolberg accompanied him on a journey ca. 250 km onto the inland ice sheet. Subsequently, with Bäbler and Arnold Heim, he ascended the Karajak Nunataks to survey the glaciers for comparison with observations by Erich von Drygalski 16 years earlier.

In 1911, the year in which Switzerland's first earthquake surveillance station at Degenried was inaugurated, he additionally became director of the Seismological Service. Together with Auguste Piccard, he later constructed a technologically advanced seismograph for this station. Also in 1911, de Quervain married Elisabeth Nil, with whom he would have 2 sons.

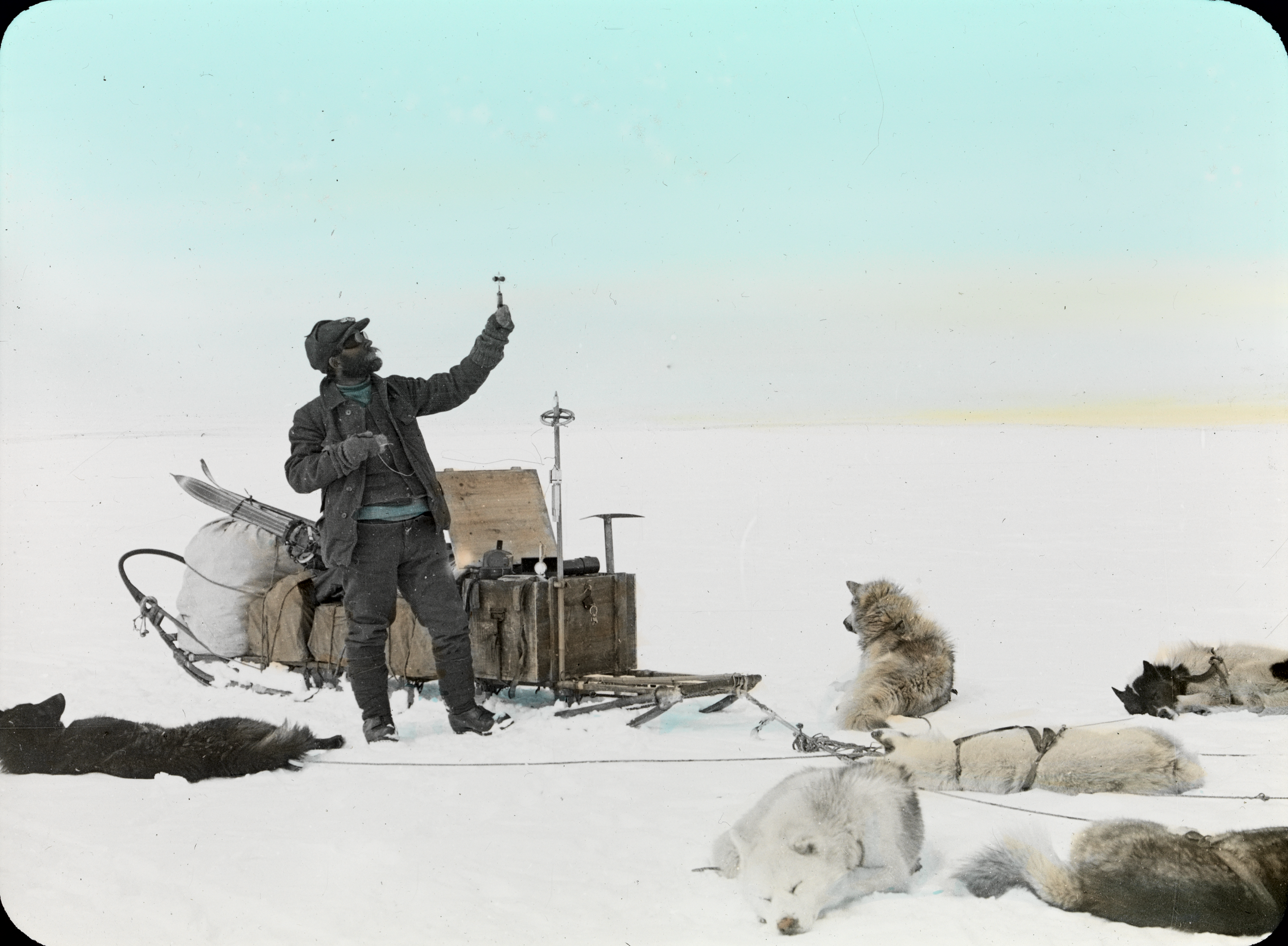
Alfred de Quervain in Greenland, 1912

De Quervain led a second expedition to Greenland in 1912. Together with Hans Hoessly, Roderich Fick, and Karl Gaule, he crossed the inland ice sheet from west to east using dog sledges and skis. They set out on 20 June 1912 from what is now called Quervainshavn east of Ataa. Near the east coast, they discovered a mountain chain which they named Schweizerland. Amassalik (now Tasiilaq) on the east coast was reached on 1 August. They traversed about 640 km in total, establishing an altitude profile of Greenland significantly further north than Fridtjof Nansen's from 1888.

In 1915, he was officially appointed professor at the University of Zurich. He also lectured at the ETH Zurich.

De Quervain had an important part in constructing the Jungfraujoch research station, which was completed only after his death from a stroke in 1927.

== Honours ==
There are several geographical features named after Alfred de Quervain:

- Quervainshavn, a bay of Uummannaq Fjord
- Quervain Bjerg, a mountain of Schweizerland
- Quervain Peak, a mountain in Antarctica
