= Jens Munk Island =

Island in Sermersooq, Greenland

Native name: Søren Norbyes Ø
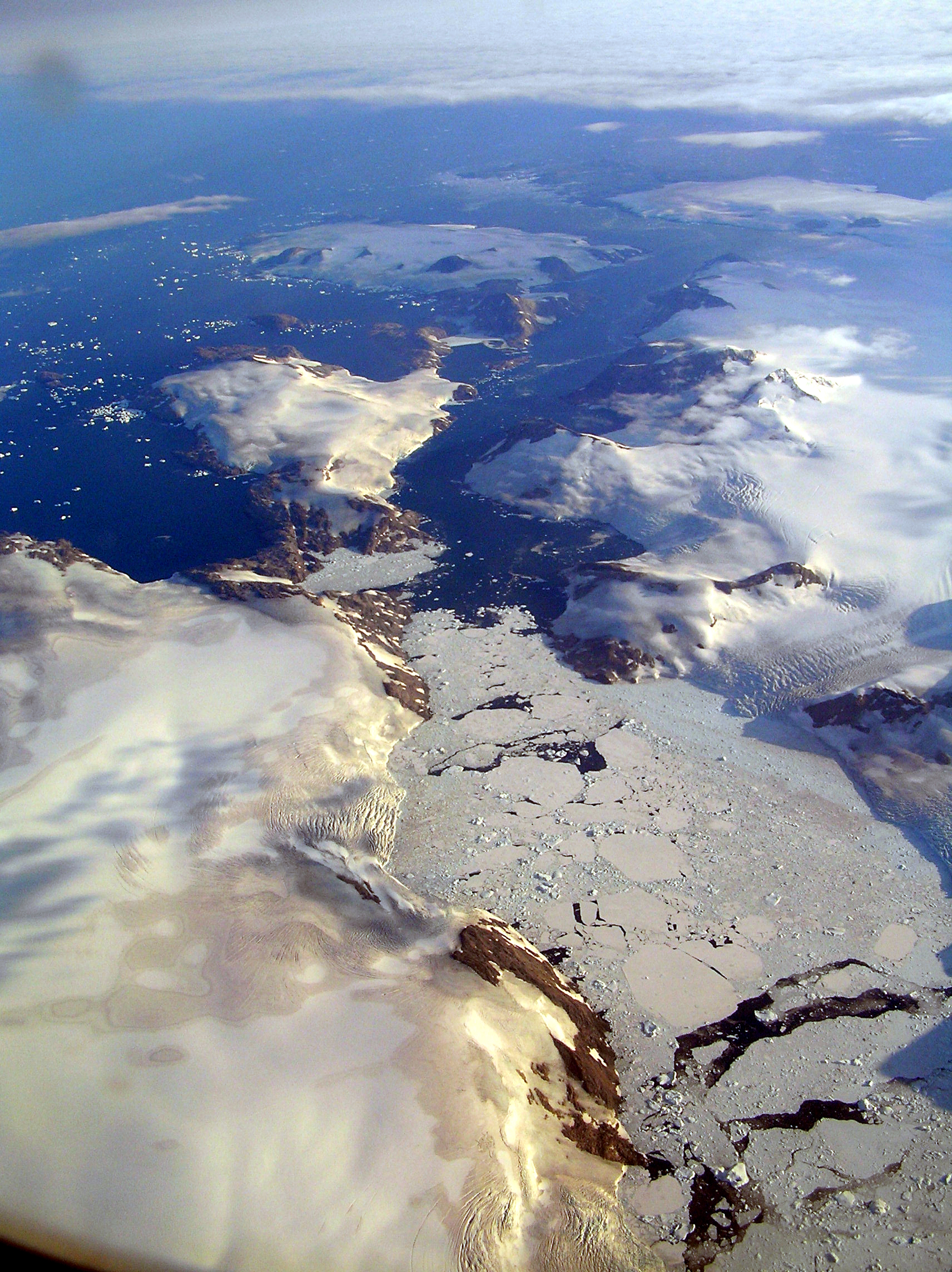
- Aerial view of Jens Munk Island (left), view to the south

- Location of Jens Munk Island in Greenland
- Interactive map of Jens Munk Island

Geography
- Location: Irminger Sea
- Coordinates: 64°49′N 40°35′W
- Archipelago: Søren Norby Islands
- Adjacent to: North Atlantic Ocean
- Area: 471 km^{2} (182 sq mi)
- Area rank: 17th largest in Greenland
- Length: 61 km (37.9 mi)
- Width: 7.6 km (4.72 mi)
- Coastline: 186 km (115.6 mi)
- Highest elevation: 756 m (2480 ft)

Administration
- Greenland
- Municipality: Sermersooq

Demographics
- Population: 0 (2021)
- Pop. density: 0/km^{2} (0/sq mi)
- Ethnic groups: Inuit

Jens Munk Island (Danish: Søren Norbyes Ø), uninhabited coastal island in eastern Greenland in the Sermersooq municipality. It is named after the Dano-Norwegian navigator and explorer Jens Munk. The island is the largest in the Søren Norby Islands archipelago.

== Geography ==
The island is located on the southern side of Pikiulleq Bay and north of the Fridtjof Nansen Peninsula, separated from the mainland by a 45 km long sound named Kagssortoq (Kattertooq), which has a width ranging between 0.7 and 6.5 km. The southern part of the island is covered by an ice cap.

The island has an area of 470.7 km ² and a shoreline of 185.9 kilometres. Its southernmost point is Cape Lovelorn, projecting from a steep 280 m high headland at the northern limit of Umivik Bay.

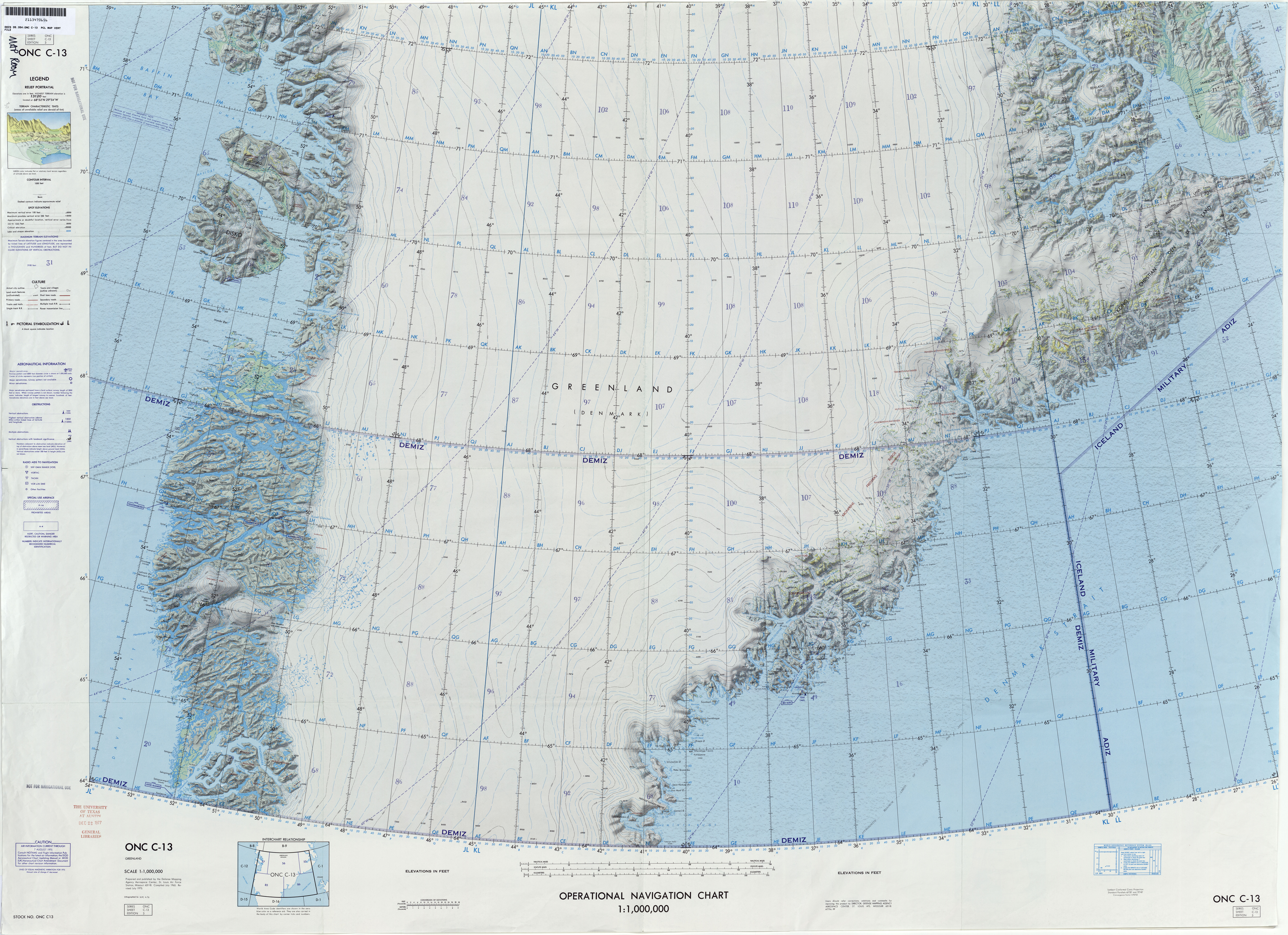
Map of Greenland section.

== See also ==
- List of islands of Greenland
