= Cape Discord =

Headland in southeast Greenland

Cape Discord Kap Discord, Kangeq
- Cape
- Coordinates: 60°53′N 42°38′W
- Location: King Frederick VI Coast
- Offshore water bodies: North Atlantic Ocean

Area
  - Total: Arctic
- Elevation: 430 m (1,410 ft)

Cape Discord (Danish: Kap Discord), also known as Kangeq, is a headland in the North Atlantic Ocean, southeast Greenland, Kujalleq municipality.

== History ==
Cape Discord was named in old maps before Lieutenant Wilhelm August Graah passed it in 1829 during his East Coast expedition. Graah took a latitude observation at the headland.

== Geography ==
Cape Discord is located east of Danell Fjord, at the eastern end of Iluileq Island, 11 km (6.8 mi) northeast of the mouth of Paatusoq Fjord. The entrance of Kangerluk Fjord is 7 km (4.3 mi) NW and that of Kuutseq Fjord 20 km (12 mi) SSW of the cape.

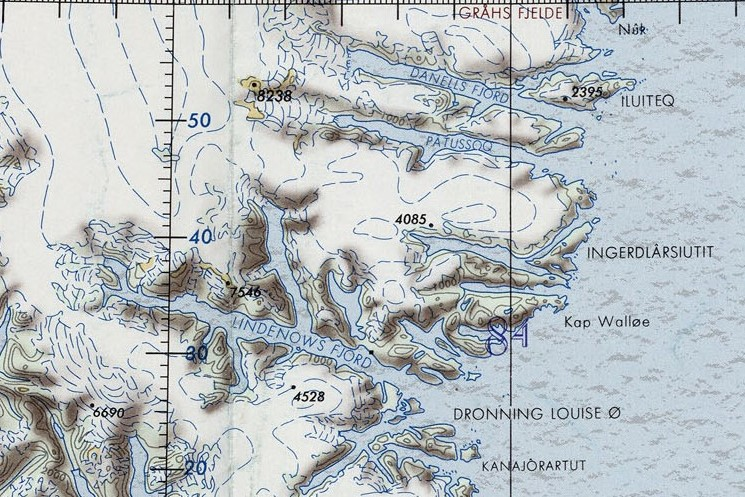
Map of Greenland section showing Iluileq.

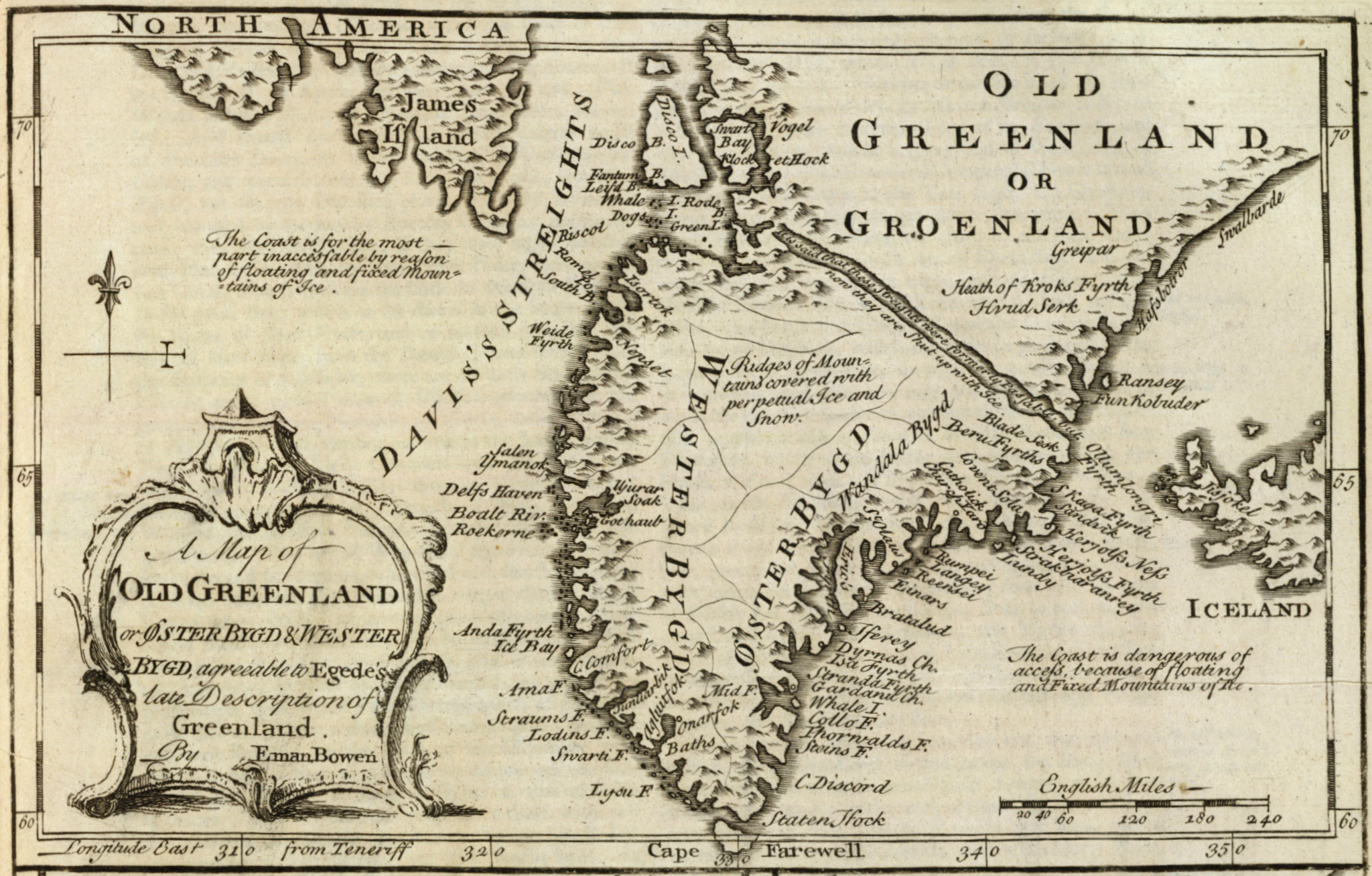
1747 map of Greenland showing Cape Discord.
