= Kangerluk Fjord =

Fjord in Greenland

Kangerluk
- Kangerluluarak
- Location in Greenland
- Interactive map of Kangerluk
- Location: Arctic (SE Greenland)
- Coordinates: 60°59′N 42°46′W
- Ocean/sea sources: North Atlantic Ocean
- Basin countries: Greenland
- Max. length: 11 km (6.8 mi)
- Max. width: 3.5 km (2.2 mi)

Kangerluk, also known as Kangerluluarak, is a fjord in the King Frederick VI Coast, Kujalleq municipality, southern Greenland.

== History ==
In Kangerluk there is a small cove at a place named Saqqap Nuua (Serkertnua) where Lieutenant Wilhelm August Graah was detained seventeen days in 1829 during his East Coast expedition owing to the difficult ice and weather conditions to the north.

=== Mountains ===
Kangerluk is a short fjord. Several glaciers discharge into the fjord from the Graah Mountains (Graah Fjelde) rising to the west and displaying purple and blue strata.

Kangerluk extends in a roughly northwest–southeast direction for 11 km (6.8 mi) between Kangerluluk Fjord to the north and Iluileq Fjord (Danell Fjord) to the south. To the southeast the fjord opens into the North Atlantic Ocean NW of Cape Discord and the island of Iluileq.

== See also ==
- List of fjords of Greenland
- Syenite
