= Cape Walløe =

Headland in Greenland

Cape Walløe Kap Walløe, Kangeq, Kangerssiuasik
- Cape
- Coordinates: 60°35′N 42°50′W
- Location: King Frederick VI Coast
- Offshore water bodies: North Atlantic Ocean

Area
  - Total: Arctic
- Elevation: 310 m (1,020 ft)

Cape Walløe (Danish: Kap Walløe), also known as Kangeq and Kangerssiuasik, is a headland in the North Atlantic Ocean, southeast Greenland, Kujalleq municipality.

== History ==
Cape Walløe was named in 1829 by Lieutenant Wilhelm August Graah (1793–1863) after Dano-Norwegian Arctic explorer Peder Olsen Walløe (1716–1793) who was the first European known with certainty to have explored the southern part of the southeastern coast of Greenland using local umiak boats. This headland was the farthest point that Walløe reached up the then uncharted coast before he had to turn back because he found it impossible to proceed further north owing to the ice.

== Geography ==
Cape Walløe is located 7 km (4.3 mi) northeast of the mouth of Nattoralik Fjord. The entrance of Kangerluaraq Fjord lies to the NW around the cape.

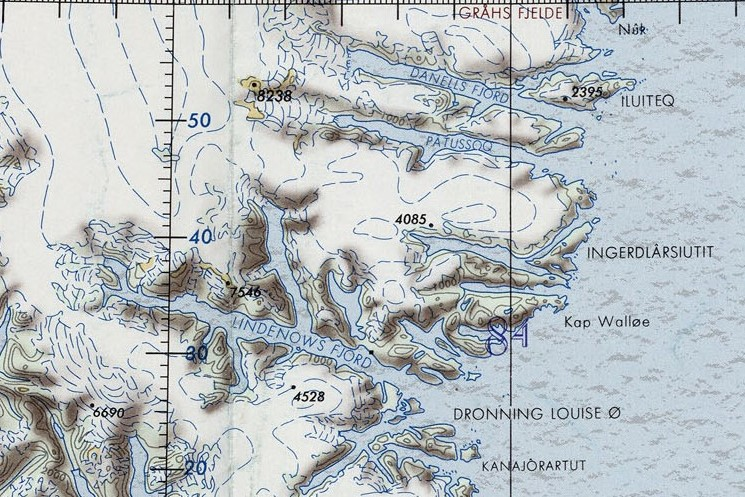
Map of Greenland section showing Kap Walløe
