= Dannebrog Island =

Island in Greenland

Dannebrogsø
- Location within Greenland

Geography
- Location: North Atlantic Ocean; Southern Greenland
- Coordinates: 65°19′N 39°35′W
- Archipelago: Graah Archipelago
- Length: 16 km (9.9 mi)
- Width: 5.5 km (3.42 mi)
- Highest elevation: 430 m (1410 ft)

Administration
- Greenland
- Municipality: Sermersooq

Demographics
- Population: 0

Dannebrog Island (Danish: Dannebrogsø) is an uninhabited island of the King Christian IX Land coast, Sermersooq municipality, southern Greenland.

The island was named by officer of the Danish Navy Wilhelm August Graah and it was the northernmost point he reached during his 1828–1830 expedition along the southeast coast of Greenland.

== Geography ==
Dannebrog Island is located on the southern side of the entrance of the Ikertivaq, a bay north of the Pikiulleq Bay. Suunikajik Island lies 18 km to the NE, at the other side of the sound. Its highest point is a 430 metres (1,411 feet) high summit topped by an ice cap.

The tiny sound of Timmiarmiit Tunorqtariât divides it from the mainland in the north. Dannebrog is the largest island of the Graah Archipelago. Off its southern shoreline lies the island of Ittit and off the western end the mainland and the island of Simîtakajâ.

The island's coastline is irregular with bays in the north and the west, as well as an inlet on its eastern side between two peninsulas. There is a cairn standing at a height of 217 m on the northern peninsula of the eastern side of Dannebrog Island.

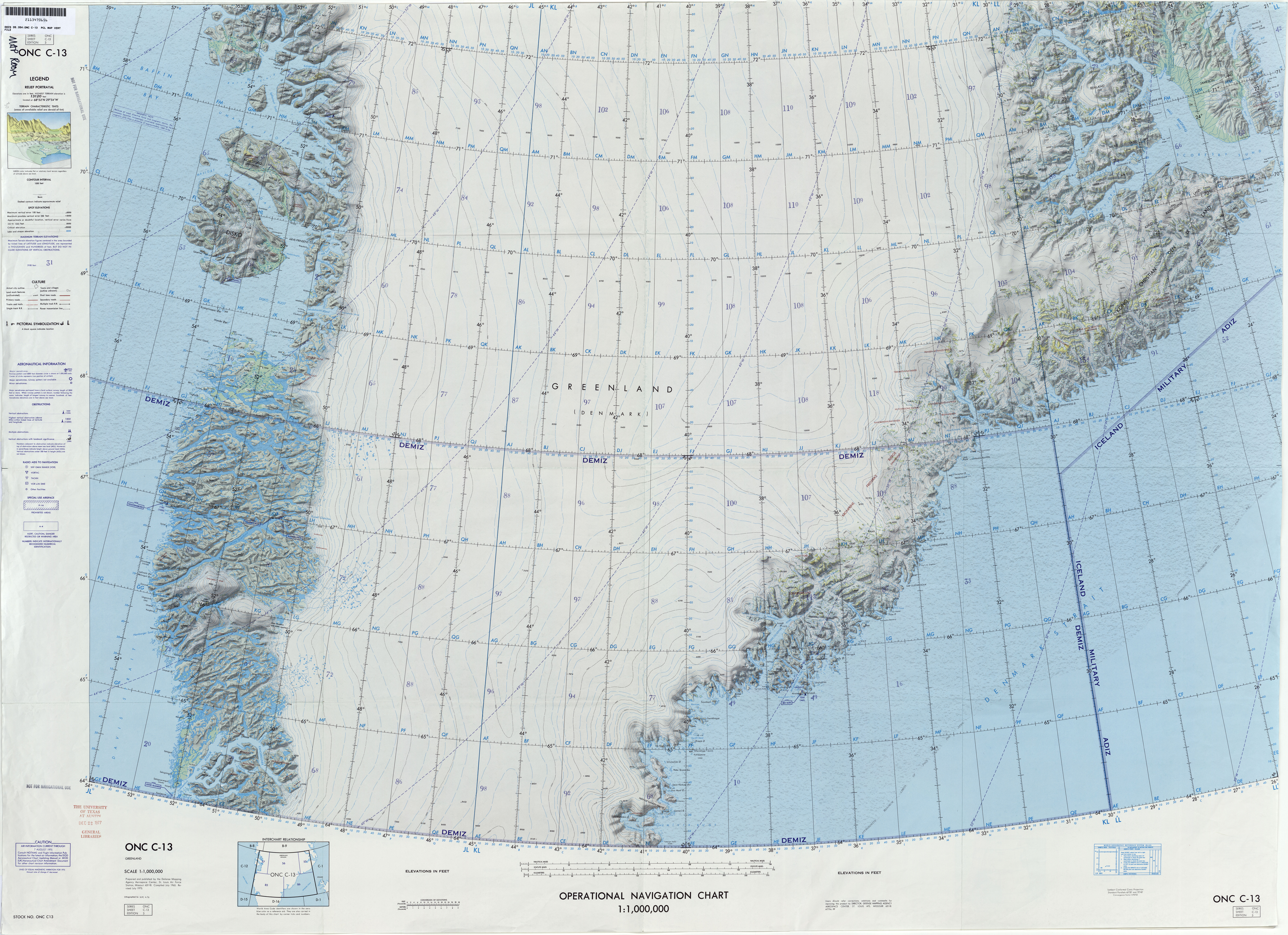
Map of Greenland section.

== See also ==
- List of islands of Greenland
- Cartographic expeditions to Greenland

== Bibliography ==
- Graah, W. A. (2014). Narrative of an Expedition to the East Coast of Greenland. weitsuechtig. ISBN 3943850528.
