= Nattoralik =

Fjord in the King Frederick VI Coast

- Nagtoralik
- Location in Greenland
- Interactive map of Nattoralik
- Location: Arctic (SE Greenland)
- Coordinates: 60°31′N 43°3′W
- Ocean/sea sources: North Atlantic Ocean
- Basin countries: Greenland
- Max. length: 8 km (5.0 mi)
- Max. width: 1.8 km (1.1 mi)

Nattoralik, old spelling Nagtoralik, is a fjord in the King Frederick VI Coast, Kujalleq municipality, southern Greenland.

There is a Paleo-Eskimo archaeological site on the northern shore of the fjord.

== Geography ==
Nattoralik is a short fjord lying between the Kangerluaraq to the north and the Nanuuseq fjord to the south. It extends in a roughly east–west direction from its mouth in the North Atlantic Ocean for about 8 km until its head. Its entrance lies 3.5 mi (5.6 km) north of Nanuseq and Cape Walløe rises 4.5 mi (7.2 km) to the northeast.

In the same manner as in the fjords further north, dark-hued mountains rise steeply from the coastline on both sides with heights averaging between 600 and 800 m.

No glaciers reach the waters of this fjord, instead the fjord bends sharply northwards at its head ending in a valley with a succession of small lakes and a 932 m (3,058 ft) high snowy peak towering above it on its eastern side.

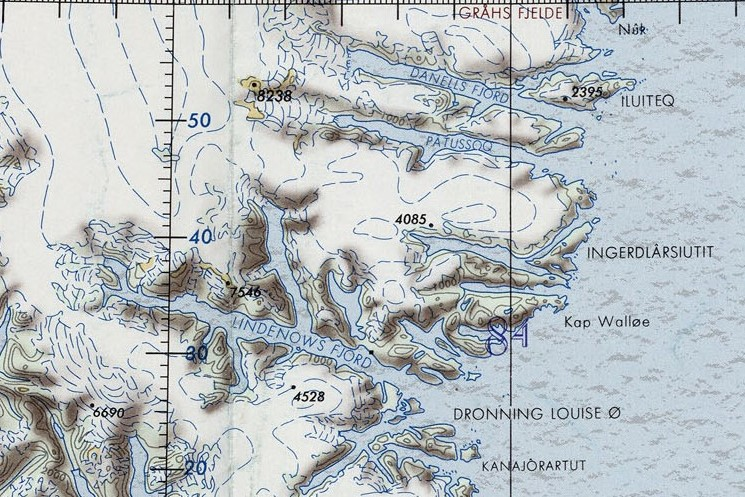
Map of Greenland section showing Nattoralik.

== See also ==
- List of fjords of Greenland
