= Iluileq =

Island in Greenland

- Location in Greenland
- Interactive map of Iluileq

Geography
- Location: North Atlantic Ocean; Southern Greenland
- Coordinates: 60°52′N 42°48′W
- Highest elevation: 829 m (2720 ft)
- Highest point: Nûgâlik

Administration
- Greenland
- Municipality: Kujalleq

Demographics
- Population: 0

Iluileq (named 'Ilivilik' in old maps) is an uninhabited island in the Kujalleq municipality in southern Greenland.

== History ==
Wilhelm August Graah (1793–1863) met groups of Southeast-Greenland Inuit on the island during his 1828–30 expedition. He was impressed by some of the women, finding them more beautiful and cleaner compared with the West Greenlandic women he had known.

In June 1870 Iluileq was the place where the crew of the Hansa, the supply ship of the Second German North Polar Expedition was finally able to land after their ship became separated from the Germania, drifted with the ice pack and sank. The crew drifted on the sea ice southward and after nearly eleven months finally reached Iluileq by boat. They found no Inuit on the island. From there they followed the shore southwards until they reached the Moravian Herrnhut mission at Friedrichsthal (modern Narsaq Kujalleq) near Cape Farewell, from where they got back to Germany on a Danish ship.

== Geography ==
Iluileq is a coastal island that lies off King Frederick VI Coast in southeastern Greenland. It is located at the head of Iluileq Fjord (Danell Fjord), on the northern side of it. A small narrow fjord branch or sound separates Iluileq from the mainland on its NW side and Kangerluk Fjord opens its mouth just north of the eastern end of the sound. The island's length is 19 kilometres (12 miles) and its maximum width 5.8 kilometres (4 miles).

Iluileq has rugged cliffs, its highest point reaching 829 metres (2,720 feet). Off the eastern end of the island's coast lies Cape Discord (Kangeq) and off its southern shore lies the small cluster of islets named Ivingmiut.

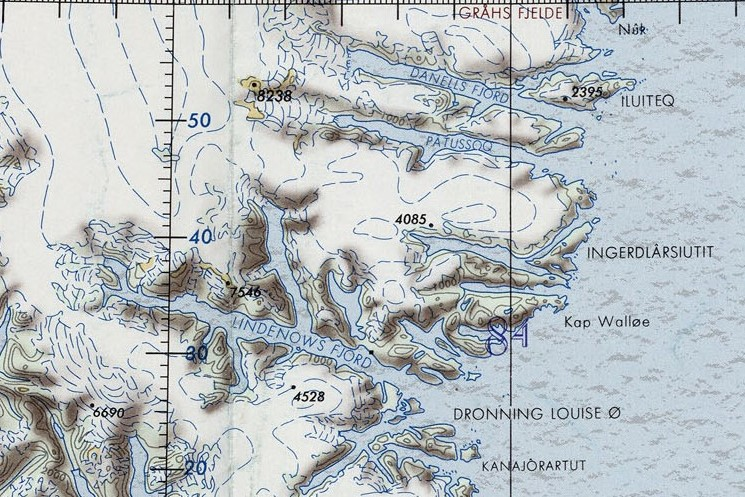
Map of Greenland section showing Iluileq Island.

== See also ==
- List of islands of Greenland
