= Cape Steen Bille =

Headland in Greenland

Cape Steen Bille Kap Steen Bille, Kangeq
- Cape
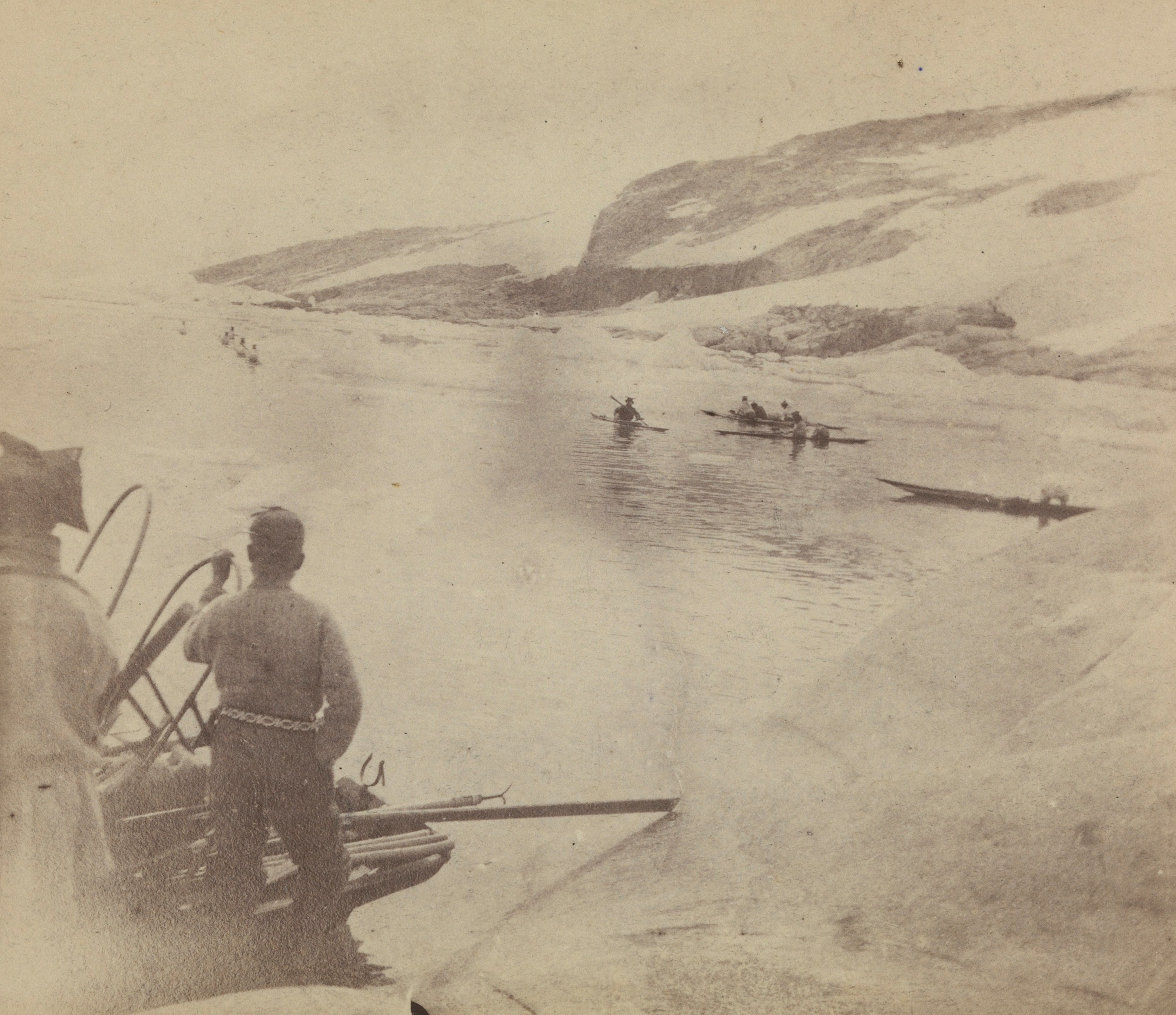
- Southeast-Greenland Inuit bidding farewell to Fridtjof Nansen at Kap Steen Bille in 1888.

- Coordinates: 62°0′N 42°7′W
- Location: King Frederick VI Coast
- Offshore water bodies: North Atlantic Ocean

Area
  - Total: Arctic
- Elevation: 640 m (2,100 ft)

Cape Steen Bille (Danish: Kap Steen Bille) or Kap Bille, also known as Kangeq, is a headland in the North Atlantic Ocean, southeast Greenland, Kujalleq municipality.

== History ==
Cape Steen Bille was named in 1829 by Lieutenant Wilhelm August Graah (1793–1863) after Steen Andersen Bille (1797–1883), Danish Royal Navy vice-admiral and minister for the navy.

Fridtjof Nansen visited the area in 1888 before his crossing of the Greenland ice sheet from the east.

== Geography ==
Cape Steen Bille is a promontory of yellowish rock located in the Puisortoq area 19 km (12 mi) south of Cape Cort Adelaer. The cluster of the Otto Rud Islands lies to the NNW around the cape.
