= Paatusoq =

Fjord in the King Frederick VI Coast, Kujalleq, Greenland

- Location in Greenland
- Interactive map of Paatusoq
- Location: Arctic (SE Greenland)
- Coordinates: 60°47′N 43°0′W
- Ocean/sea sources: North Atlantic Ocean
- Basin countries: Greenland
- Max. length: 55 km (34 mi)
- Max. width: 2.5 km (1.6 mi)

Paatusoq, mentioned as 'Patursok' by Wilhelm August Graah, is a fjord in the King Frederick VI Coast, Kujalleq municipality, southeastern Greenland. Its name means "The one with the big mouth" in Greenlandic.

== Geography ==
Paatusoq Fjord extends in a roughly east–west direction for about 55 km (34 mi) between the Danell Fjord to the north and the Kuutseq Fjord to the south. To the east the fjord opens into the North Atlantic Ocean 10 km (6.2 mi) southwest of Cape Discord. There are two rocks awash in its mouth and Qasingortoq, a 355-metre-high (1,165 ft) point marks its entrance. Danell Fjord lies close to the north, running parallel to Paatusoq.

Paatusoq has a short branch midway into its southern shore at about 23 km (14 mi) from the fjord's mouth with a glacier reaching down to the waterline.

=== Mountains ===
In the western part of Paatusoq the mountain ranges on both sides of the fjord rise steeply from the shore to heights of about 2,000 m (6,600 ft). The massive succession of mountains on the northern side culminates in Mount Paatusoq (Patuersoq), a magnificent ultra-prominent peak at 60°52′55″N 43°44′56″W towering to a height of 2,488 m (8,163 ft) above the glacier at the head of the fjord. This mountain is marked as a 8,238-foot-high (2,511 m) peak in the Defense Mapping Agency Greenland Navigation charts.

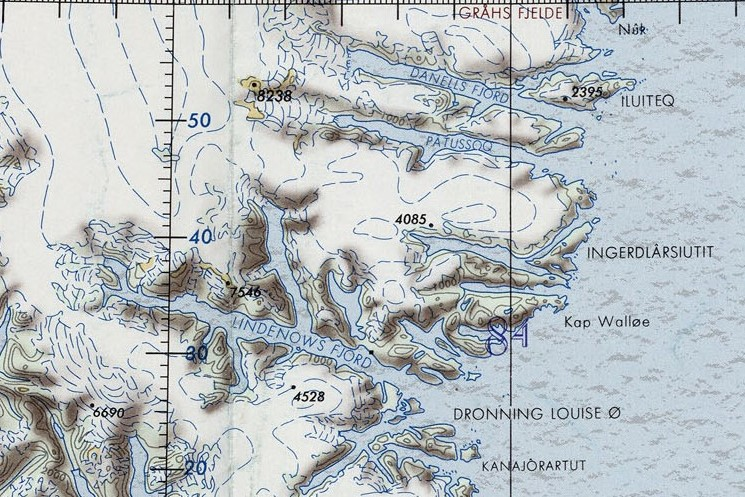
Map of Greenland section showing Paatusoq.

== See also ==
- List of fjords of Greenland
- List of Ultras of Greenland

== Bibliography ==
- The Lost Gardar Intrusion: Critical Metal Exploration at the Paatusoq Syenite Complex, South East Greenland
