= Umivik Bay =

Bay in Greenland

- Umivik Bugt (Danish)
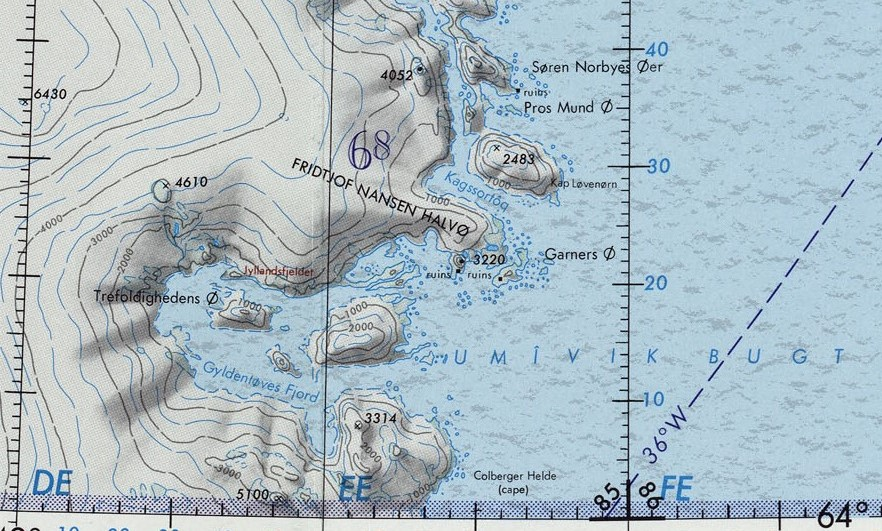
- Map of Greenland section showing Umivik Bay

- Location in Greenland
- Location: Arctic
- Coordinates: 64°14′N 40°36′W
- Ocean/sea sources: North Atlantic Ocean
- Basin countries: Greenland
- Max. length: 50 km (31 mi)
- Max. width: 25 km (16 mi)

Umivik Bay (Danish: Umivik Bugt), also known as Umiivik and Umerik, is a bay in King Frederick VI Coast, southeastern Greenland. It is part of the Sermersooq municipality.

Unlike the jagged and forbidding appearance of most fjord systems in East Greenland, the Umivik area has a relatively gentle shape. Here the massive Greenland ice sheet comes down to the shore in smooth, even undulations and the landscape looks unbroken, with only few glimpses of bare rock. Owing to this smoothness, Umivik Bay was chosen as launching point for westward overland crossings, including the pioneering 1888 Greenland venture by Fridtjof Nansen.

== Geography ==
Umivik Bay

Umivik Bay is located between the Fridtjof Nansen Peninsula to the north and the Odinland Peninsula to the south. It includes a sound and a fjord and has a few large islands, the largest of which is Upernattivik (Upernarsuak) lying squarely in the middle of the inner part of the bay. Other significant islands in the bay are Trefoldigheden, Terne Island and Tre Lover in the inner bay, as well as Pikiitsi further east off the shore. The innermost part of the bay, by the terminus of the glaciers is known as Qíngua.

The northern side of the bay includes three sounds, the Dietrichson Sound between Trefoldigheden and the mainland, the Torsukattak Sound between Upernattivik and the mainland —both about 800 metres (2,625 feet) wide, and the Sverdrup Sound between both islands. At the bay's northeastern end there is the small Jensen Bay, as well as numerous islets and rocks with intricate channels.

Umiiviip Kangertiva (Gyldenløve Fjord), was named after Hans Ulrik Gyldenløve by Lieutenant W. A. Graah in 1829. It is located on the southern side of the bay, between Upernattivik and the mainland shore; Vikingevig is a small bay in the fjord, in the northern shore of Odinland. Umivik Bay's mouth is located between Cape Colberger Heide and Cape Lovelorn in the Denmark Strait area of the Atlantic Ocean.

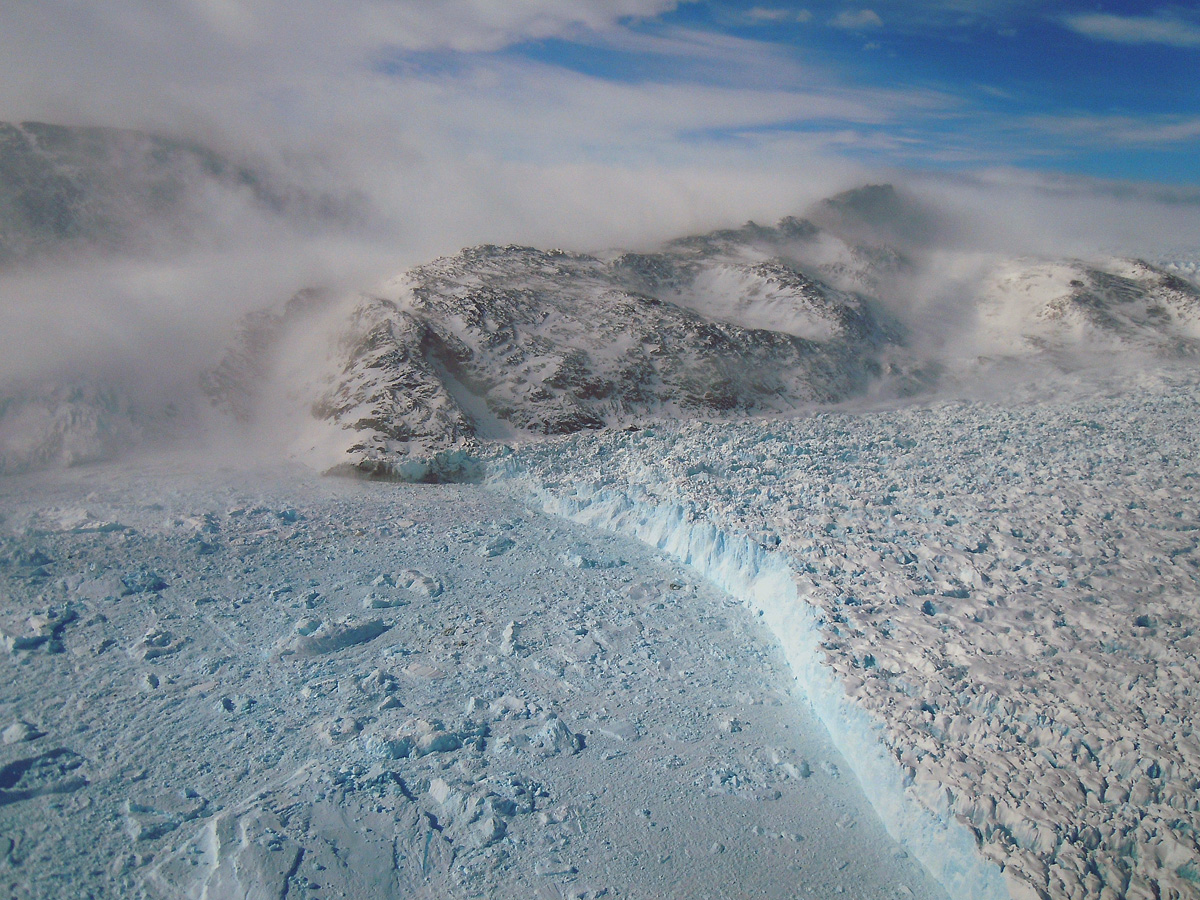
Glacier terminus at Umiiviip Kangertiva (Gyldenløve Fjord).

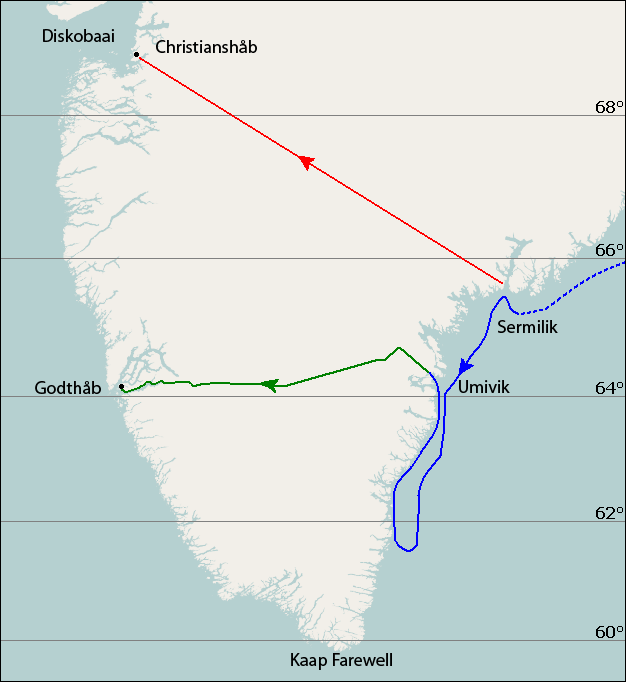
Nansen's 1888 route across Greenland showing Sermilik and Umivik in the east coast.

== History ==
There are two Paleo-Eskimo archaeological sites near the entrance to Umivik Bay on the northeastern side; one on the mainland shore and the other in the Garner Islands.

Until recent times Inuit visited the area during hunting trips. Fridjof Nansen wrote:

...as soon as the Eskimos come to a place where there are plenty of seals, they go ashore, pitch their camp, take to hunting, and live at their ease. When the autumn and winter approach, they choose a good site and build a winter-house, continuing their journey in the spring or summer as soon as the ice permits. The woman-boat in question had in this manner spent three years on the passage from Umivik, and would no doubt take pretty nearly as long to return.

Nansen's expedition left sealer Jason near Sermilik Fjord, where Nansen had initially decided to start the crossing. However, there followed days of extreme frustration for the party as, prevented by weather and sea conditions from reaching the shore, they drifted southwards with the ice. Most of this time was spent camping on the ice itself—it was too dangerous to launch the boats. By 29 July they were 380 kilometres (240 mi) south of the point where they had left the ship. On that day they finally reached land, but were too far south to begin the crossing. After a brief rest, Nansen ordered the team back into the boats and to begin rowing north.

During the next 12 days the party battled northward along the coast through the ice floes. On the first day they encountered a large Eskimo encampment near Cape Steen Bille, and there were further occasional contacts with the nomadic native population as the journey continued. On 11 August, when they had covered about 200 kilometres (120 mi) and had reached Umivik Bay, Nansen decided that although they were still far south of his intended starting place, they needed to begin the crossing before the season became too advanced for travel. After landing at Umivik, they spent the next four days preparing for their journey, and on the evening of 15 August they set out. They were heading north-west, towards Christianhaab (now Qasigiannguit) on the west Greenland shores of Disko Bay, 600 kilometres (370 mi) away.

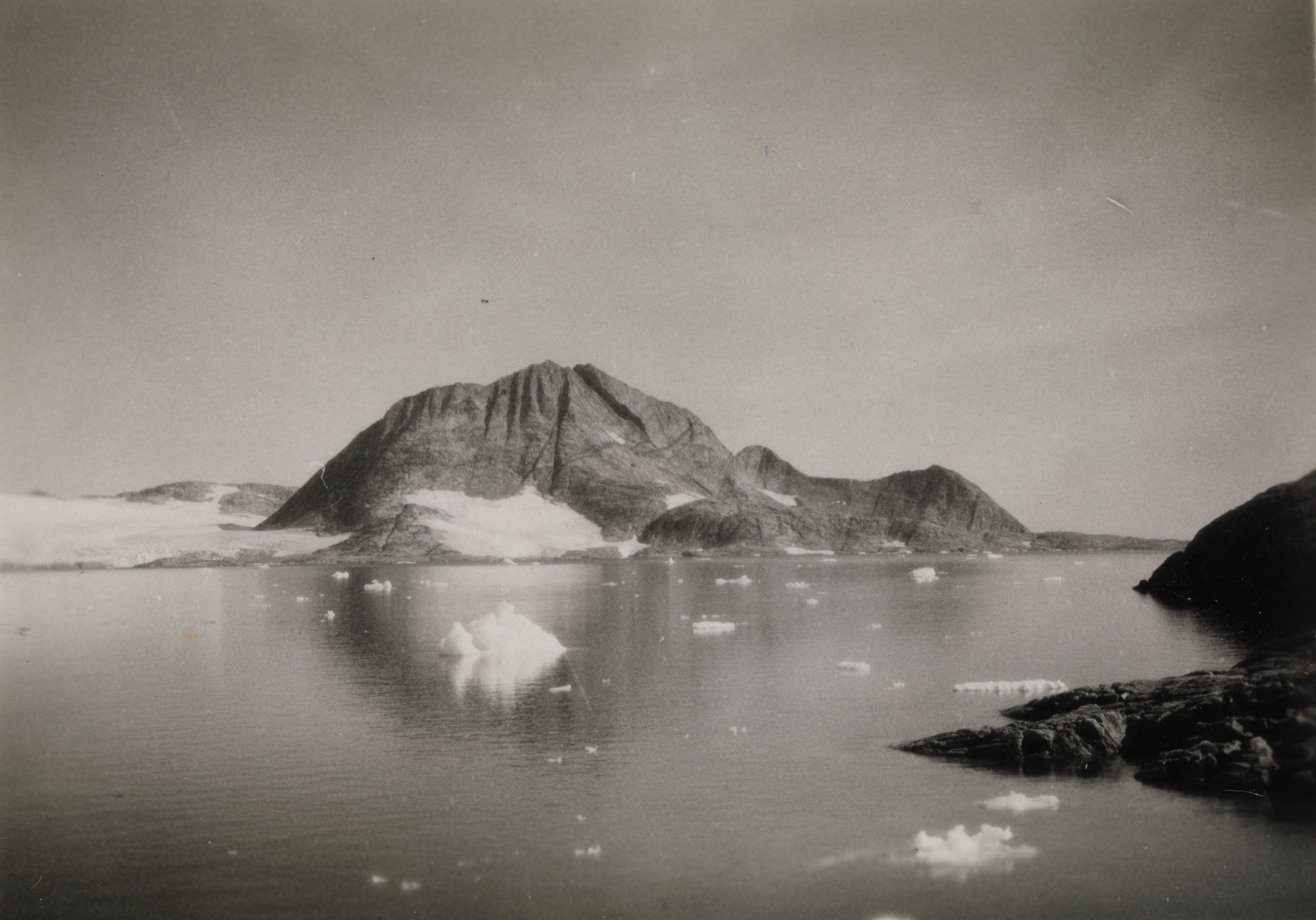
View of Umivik Bay and its promontory

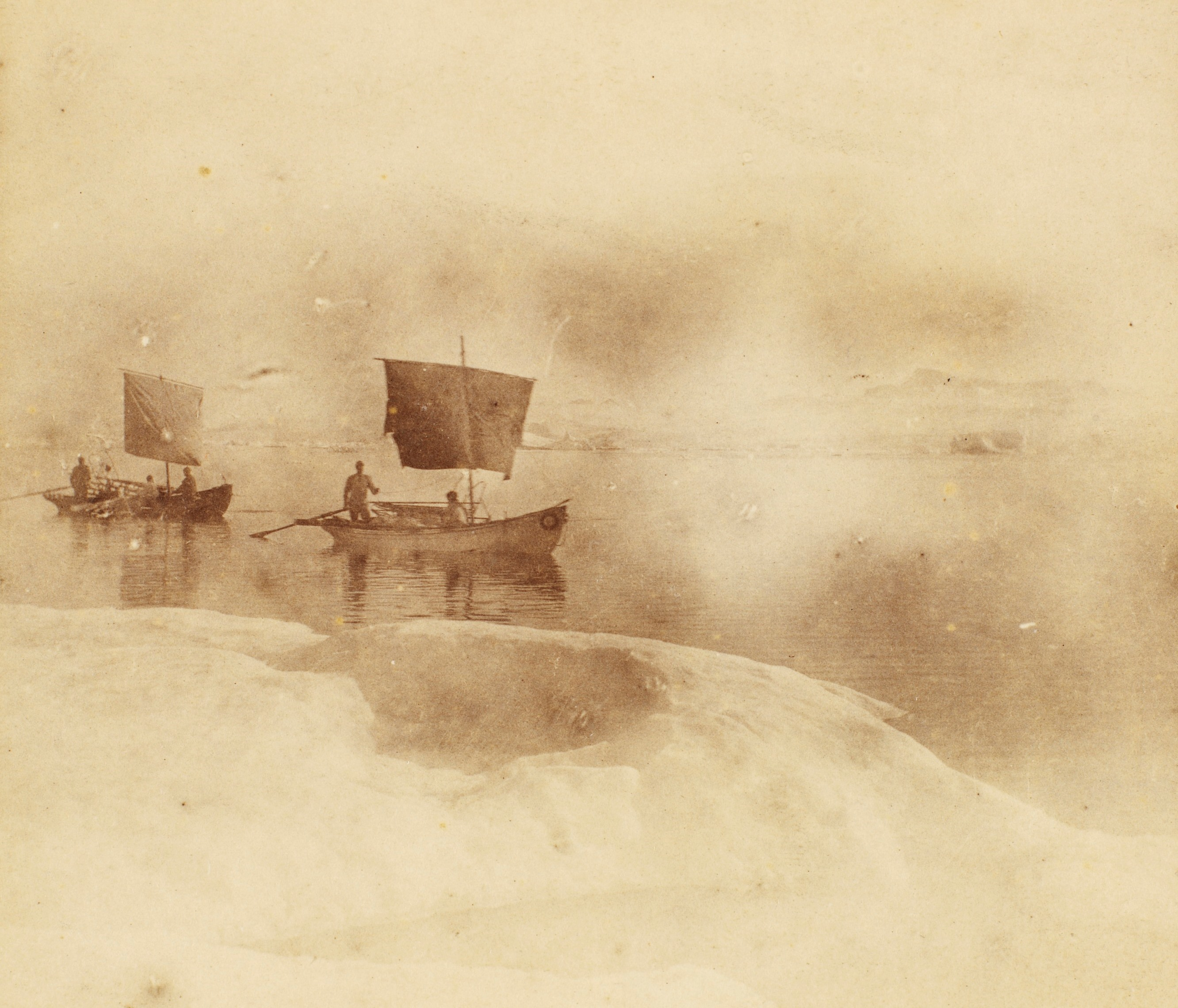
Umivik Bay. The last sailing before the members of Nansen's expedition began their skiing journey across the inland ice.

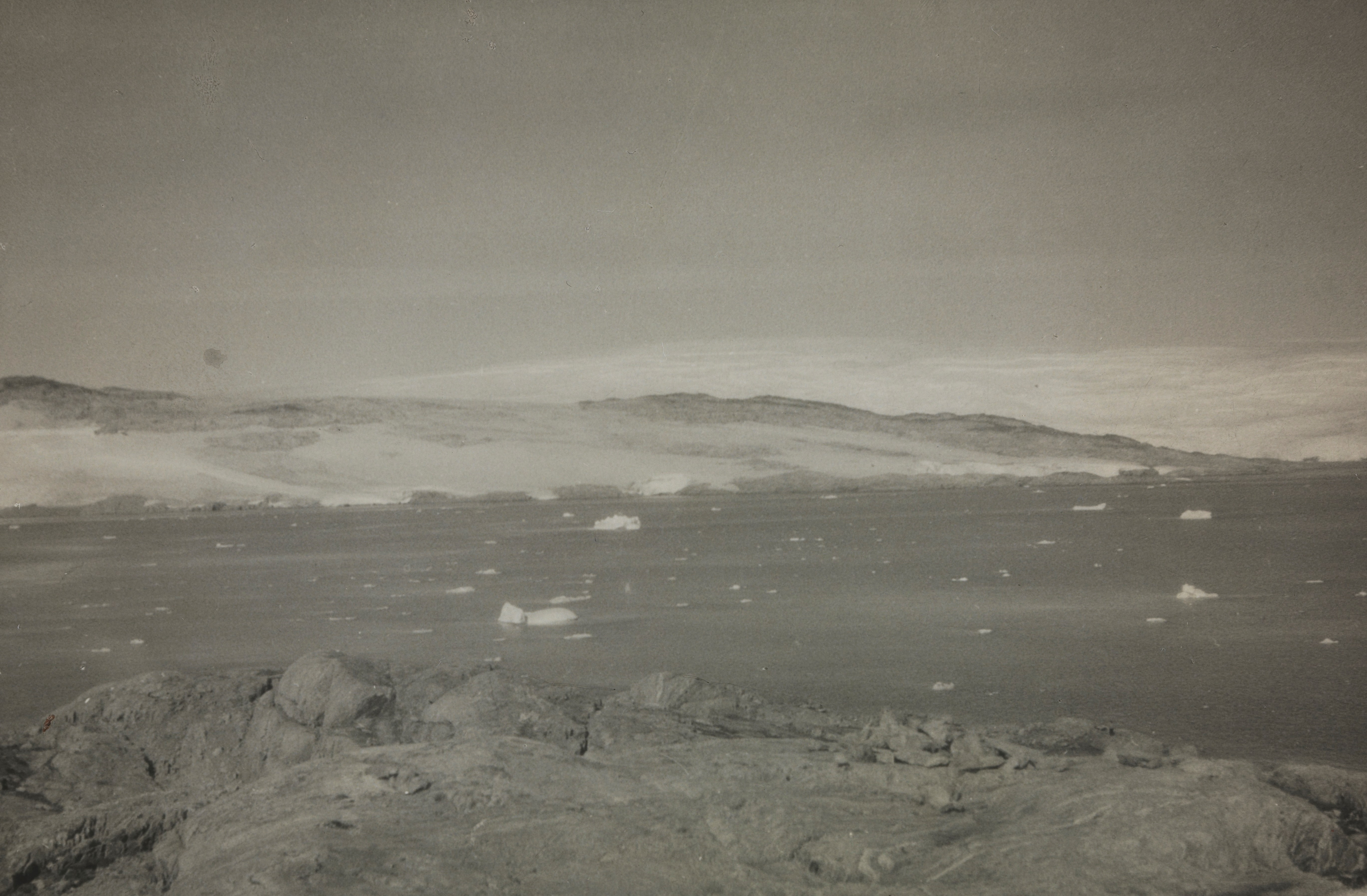
Picture of Umivik Bay by Nansen's expedition

== See also ==
- Fridtjof Nansen: The Crossing of Greenland
- List of fjords of Greenland
- Søren Norby Islands

== Bibliography ==
- Bjarne Grønnow, Jens Fog Jensen (2003). The Northernmost Ruins of the Globe. Museum Tusculanum Press. ISBN 978-8763512626
- Huntford, Roland (2001). Nansen. London: Abacus. ISBN 0-349-11492-7. (First published in 1997 by Gerald Duckworth)
- Nansen, Fridtjof (1891). Eskimoliv. Kristiania: Aschehoug.Tr. as Eskimo Life, 1893.
- Reynolds, E.E. (1949). Nansen. Harmondsworth (UK): Penguin Books.
- Scott, J.M. (1971). Fridtjof Nansen. Sheridan, Oregon: Heron Books.
