= Hans Ulrik Gyldenløve =

Illegitimate son of King Christian IV (1615–1645)

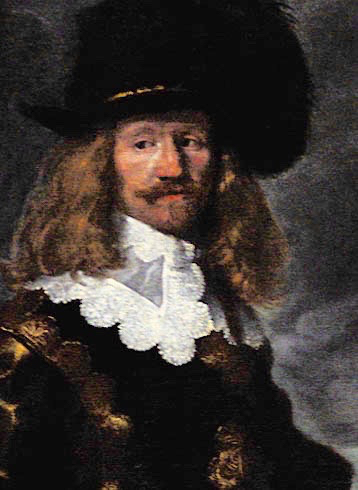
Hans Ulrik Gyldenløve by Karel van Mander III at the Frederiksborg National Museum

Hans Ulrik Gyldenløve (10 March 1615 – 31 January 1645) was the illegitimate son of King Christian IV of Denmark and his mistress, Karen Andersdatter. He was also a Danish-Norwegian Navy officer and lensmann bailiff.

== Childhood ==
Hans Ulrik was born at the Kronborg castle in Helsingør, Denmark, on 10 March 1615. He was given Gyldenløve [Golden Lion] as his surname by his father. It was the traditional surname for the illegitimate children of the kings of Denmark–Norway in the 17th century. The King also appointed Ernst Normand as the guardian of his son. Hans Ulrik was educated, along with his older half-brother Christian Ulrik, with Jens Dinesen Jersin as their teacher and, for a time, in Sorø in Zealand, Denmark. In 1629 Hans went with another half-brother, Duke Frederik, the future King Frederick III of Denmark, to France. He was also given the royal estate of Vindinge (now Fuirendal, not far from Sorø) in Zealand.

== Career ==
While the King was making a courtier and diplomat out of Christian Ulrik, he thought that the future for his other son would be in the Royal Navy. So Hans Ulrik was sent in 1634 to Karen Andersdatter's brother-in-law in Copenhagen, Laurits Andersen Hammer, the grocer, for his apprenticeship in the shipping yards. In 1635 he was made a Hofjunker [Gentleman of the Court]. In 1636, he was sent on one ship to Ireland and another ship to the Weser River in Germany. When he came back, he was appointed to the Kammerjunker [Gentleman of the Chambers].

Hans lived at the Frederiksborg until 1640, when its elderly commander died, and he had to move out. On his way to the Kronborg, he visited numerous inns and brothels, where he virtually “robbed” them of women, food and drink. Ten days later, his father received from a certain innkeeper a bill totaling almost two thousand rigsdaler, which had not been paid by Hans.

In 1640, Hans Ulrik became an unteradmiral (Rear admiral) aboard the ship “Norske Løve” [Norwegian Lion]. He was given the order to bring the Danish Ambassador, Hannibal Sehested, aboard the “Norske Løve” to Spain. When they arrived in Spain, Hans Ulrik was supposed to immediately return to Denmark and resume his studies. But he was never serious about them. Dr. Otto Sperling, the physician who was on that trip to Spain, wrote that Hans Ulrik had “intet Hoved eller Ingenium derail” [neither the head or the wit]. Instead, Hans Ulrik went ashore at Corunna with the Ambassador and had a very good time at the Court of King Philip IV in Madrid. But he paid the price; his body, never robust, could not tolerate the excesses. At one time, he was glistening with his sweat so much that the women thought that he had his face painted. Then he had an epileptic seizure right after the bullright. Apparently he had inherited his father's appetite for women, food and drink but not his health. So Sehested had to send Hans Ulrik home to Denmark. Hans Ulrik was back in Copenhagen in the spring of 1641.

Nevertheless, Hans was appointed in 1641 as the lensmann [bailiff] of the three castles, the Kronborg, the Frederiksborg, and the Abrahamstrup (now the Jægerspris Castle). To his duties, the island of Hven, then a part of Denmark, was added in 1642, when his mother died, but he had already been on the island's board of directors as an overseer on her behalf.

From 1641 until his death, Hans was the commander of his birthplace, the Kronborg. But his health was still delicate. He often had epileptic seizures. He was once warned by Dr. Sperling that, if he did not control his appetites, he would have a stroke. But dropsy killed him at the Kronborg on 31 January 1645, two months short of his 30th birthday. He was buried at the Vor Frue Kirke [The Church of Our Lady], the National and Royal Cathedral of Denmark in Copenhagen, but, by 1889, his tombstone was destroyed.

== Family ==
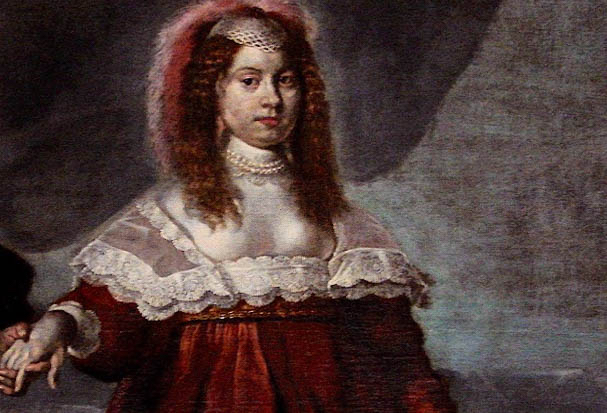
Regitze Grubbe by Karel van Mander III at the Frederiksborg National Museum

On 10 October 1641, Hans married Regitze Grubbe (1618-1689). She was the daughter of Jørgen Grubbe and his wife Lene Knudsdatter Rud of Tostrup and Hageløs, both members of the Danish ancient nobility, and was a granddaughter of the statesman Eiler Grubbe. She was also a relative of Erik Grubbe of Tjele, the father of Marie Grubbe. But she and Hans Ulrik never had any children.

After her husband's death, his widow inherited Hven as her estate but, in 1654, she traded it for an annual pension of 1,000 dalers. She moved her household to Esrum Monastery on the island of Zealand in 1647 but, in 1661, she was living at House No. 12–16 on Østergade in Copenhagen. Six years later, she won the lawsuit against the heirs of a certain Ruderne over the burials at the Vor Frue Kirke but, in 1678, she was accused of complicity in the attempted murder of the Countess Parsberg and banished to the island of Bornholm for the rest of her life. She died there in 1689.

== Legacy ==
A portrait of him, painted by Karel van Mander III, hangs at the Rosenborg Castle. At the Frederiksborg National Museum [Frederiksborgmuseet], there is a large painting that shows a couple dancing, in clothes from the medieval times, at the Vernø Monastery (a medieval monastery in Rygge, Norway, southeast of Oslo). The models for this couple are believed to be Hans Ulrik Gyldenløve and his wife, Regitze.

Gyldenløve Fjord in East Greenland was named after him by Lieutenant W. A. Graah in 1829.

== Literature ==
- (in Danish) S[ophus]. Birket-Smith, ed., Dr. med. Otto Sperlings Selvbiografi, 1602-1673 [Dr. Otto Sperling's Autobiography, 1602-1673] (Copenhagen: A. F. Høst & Søn Boghandels [Andreas Frederik Høst & Son Publications], 1885), pp. 94 ff.
- (in Danish) J[ulius]. A[lbert]. Fridericia, “Gyldenløve, Hans Ulrik”, Dansk biografisk Lexikon, Bind VI [Danish Biographical Dictionary, Volume VI], Gerson - H. Hansen (Copenhagen: Gyldendal Boghandels [Gyldendal Publications], 1892), pp. 339–340.
- (in Danish) H[ans]. D[aniel]. Lind, Kong Kristian den fjerde og hans mænd paa Bremerholm [King Christian the Fourth and His Men at Bremerholm] (Copenhagen: Gyldendal Boghandels, 1889), pages 299–302.
- (in Danish) Kay Nielsen and Ib Askholm, Danmarks kongelige familier i 1000 år [Denmark's Royal Families in 1000 Years] (Copenhagen: Askholms forlag, 2007)

== See also ==
- Gyldenløve
