= Kangerluaraq =

Fjord in Greenland

- Kangerdluaraq
- Location in Greenland
- Interactive map of Kangerluaraq
- Location: Arctic (SE Greenland)
- Coordinates: 60°35′N 42°59′W
- Ocean/sea sources: North Atlantic Ocean
- Basin countries: Greenland
- Max. length: 24 km (15 mi)
- Max. width: 1.7 km (1.1 mi)

Kangerluaraq, old spelling Kangerdluaraq, is a fjord in the King Frederick VI Coast, Kujalleq municipality, southern Greenland.

== Geography ==
Kangerluaraq is a narrow fjord lying between the Kuutseq to the north and the Nattoralik and Nanuuseq fjords to the south. It extends in a roughly east–west direction from its mouth in the North Atlantic Ocean for about 24 km until its head. Its entrance is on the northern side of Cape Walløe (Kangersivasik).

In the same manner as in the fjords further north, dark-hued mountains rise steeply from the shore on both sides. However, there are no glaciers reaching down to the waterline in Kangerluaraq, the fjord ending in a steep and narrow valley at its western end.

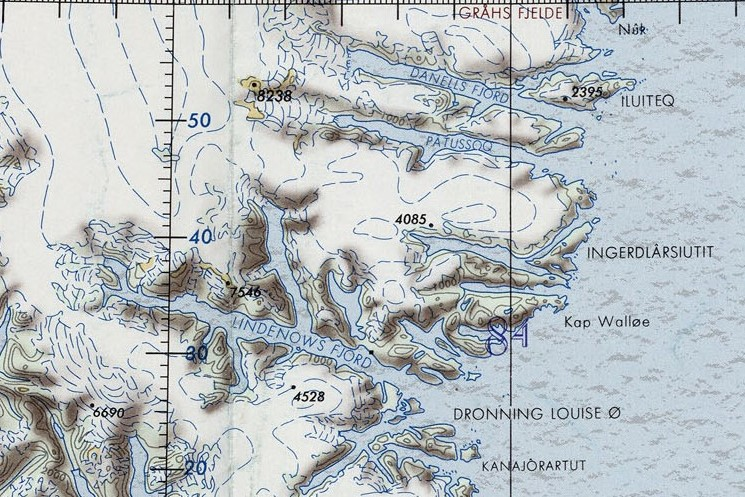
Map of Greenland section showing Kangerluaraq

== See also ==
- List of fjords of Greenland
