= Kuutseq =

Fjord in Greenland

- Location in Greenland
- Interactive map of Kuutseq
- Location: Arctic (SE Greenland)
- Coordinates: 60°38′N 42°54′W
- Ocean/sea sources: North Atlantic Ocean
- Basin countries: Greenland
- Max. length: 37 km (23 mi)
- Max. width: 2.8 km (1.7 mi)

Kuutseq is a fjord in the King Frederick VI Coast, Kujalleq municipality, southern Greenland.

== Geography ==
Kuutseq Fjord lies between the Paatusoq to the north and the Kangerluaraq to the south. It extends in a roughly northeast–southwest direction from its mouth in the North Atlantic Ocean for about 14 km then bends to a roughly east–west direction for a further 23 km until its head. To the east there is an arm at the bend of the fjord named Qassit with the isthmus of the small Ingerlaarsiutit Peninsula at the eastern end.

Kuutseq has a short but wide branch near the head of the fjord with a broad glacier reaching down to the waterline. Although rising steeply from the shore on both sides of the fjord, the mountains in this fjord are not reaching the impressive heights of the summits in Paatusoq to the north. Cape Discord is located 20 km (12 mi) to the NNE of Kuutseq.

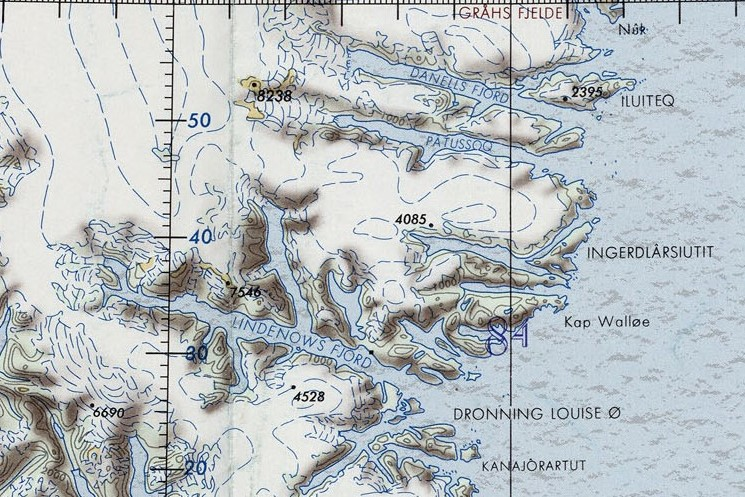
Map of Greenland section showing Kuutseq.

== See also ==
- List of fjords of Greenland
