= Mount Paatusoq =

Mountain in Greenland

- Location within Greenland

Highest point
- Elevation: 2,488 m (8,163 ft)
- Listing: North America prominent peaks; North America most isolated peaks; North America Ultra prominent peak; Greenland Ultra prominent peak
- Coordinates: 60°52′55″N 43°44′56″W

Geography
- Location: Mount Paatusoq, SE Greenland

Climbing
- First ascent: 1966

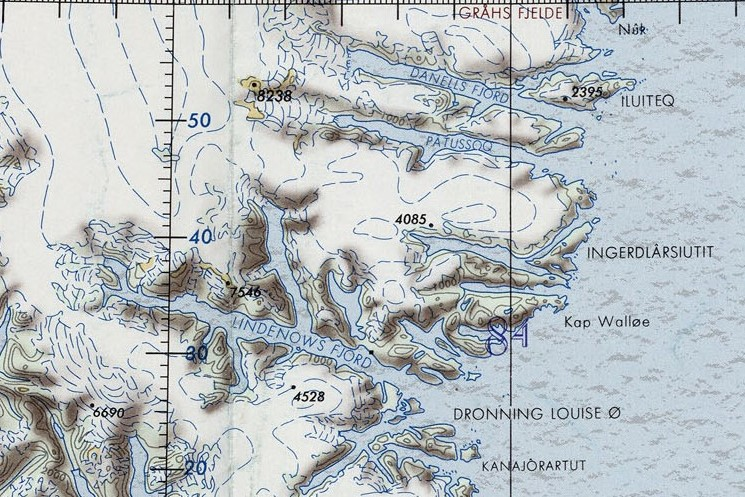
Map of Greenland section showing Mount Paatusoq as a 8,238-foot-high (2,511 m) peak in the upper left quarter.

Mount Paatusoq, also known as 'Mount Patuersoq', is the highest mountain in the Kujalleq municipality, south-east Greenland.

Paatusoq is also the highest peak in the King Frederick VI Coast area of far southeastern Greenland.

== History ==
Long considered the highest unclimbed peak in remote southeastern Greenland, Mt Paatusoq was finally climbed in 1966 by Austrian alpinist Toni Dürnberger in very difficult conditions. Some of the team members fell into a crevasse and one of them was seriously injured. Dürnberger had previously led the 1962 Austro-German Greenland Expedition (Österreichische Deutsche Grönland Expedition 1962) that had climbed unscaled peaks in the Sermilik area from April to July 1962.

== Geography ==
Rising on the northern side of the inner end of Paatusoq fjord Mount Paatusoq is an isolated peak in a remote and uninhabited location. This mighty mountain rises steeply from the glacier located north of the nunatak at the glacier confluence that has its terminus in Paatusoq fjord 10 km to the ESE.

In the western part of Paatusoq fjord the mountain ranges on both sides of the fjord rise steeply from the shore to heights of about 2,000 m (6,600 ft). The massive succession of mountains on the northern side culminates in this ultra-prominent peak towering to a height of 2,488 m (8,163 ft) above the glacier at the head of the fjord. This mountain is marked as a 8,238-foot-high (2,511 m) peak in the Defense Mapping Agency Greenland Navigation charts and as a 8,990-foot-high (2,740 m) mountain in other sources.

Geologically the western end of the range and the mountains in the nunatak south of it are part of the Paatusoq Syenite Complex.

== See also ==
- List of mountains in Greenland
- List of Nunataks§Greenland
- List of the ultra-prominent summits of North America
- List of the major 100-kilometer summits of North America
