= Karen Andersdatter =

Danish noble (died 1673)

- Died: 1673; Copenhagen, Denmark
- Children: 2 including Hans Ulrik Gyldenløve

Karen Andersdatter (died 1673 in Copenhagen, Denmark) was the Danish mistress of King Christian IV of Denmark-Norway and the mother of one of his three illegitimate but acknowledged children, Hans Ulrik Gyldenløve.

== Early life ==
Andersdatter was born in Bremerholm, a village on a little island in the bay of Copenhagen. Bremerholm is present-day a riverside neighborhood of downtown Copenhagen. Andersdatter's father was Anders Hansen Wincke, a secretary from Bremerholm in Copenhagen. Andersdatter's mother was Bodil Knudsdatter Skriver. Andersdatter's maternal uncle was Antonius Knudson (ca 1564–1614), the rådmann [councilman] (1607) and borgermester (mayor) (1611–1614) of Oslo.

== Personal life ==
=== Life with King of Denmark ===
When Andersdatter met the King of Denmark for the first time, she was said to have been already engaged to a pastor named Niels Simonsen Glostrup. But Christian IV fell in love with her. In the beginning of 1613, the King swept Andersdatter away from a wedding feast to his castle, where they danced away the night. Andersdatter became his mistress and bore him one short-lived daughter, Dorothea Elisabeth Gyldenløve (1613-1615) and a son, Hans Ulrik Gyldenlove (1615-1645). Andersdatter's former fiancé, in the meantime, married her sister, Anna, and became the Bishop of Oslo two years later and he would hold his position until his death in 1639.

But, after more than three years at the court, Andersdatter, probably because of the marriage the King had made with Kirsten Munk. However, he arranged to have Andersdatter endowed with the island of Hven (then a part of Denmark, but now, with the name of Ven, a part of Sweden, in the Øresund) and an annual pension. He was said to have also given Andersdatter a couple of mansions in Copenhagen.

In 1640, there were rumors at the court that Andersdatter was planning to marry a university student by the name of Niels Nelausen. When the king heard the news, he was not pleased. The King confiscated Hven from Andersdatter and tried to get a hold of her, “Junker Snarensvend” [Lady Sweet Snare]. The engagement had to be abandoned but that did mollify the King. He raised her annuities and even commanded, shortly before his death, they would be provided by the Royal Treasury. Although the subsequent investigation upheld his decision, she found it hard, in the following economic difficulties, to get her money, which did not come for several years. So she suffered great distress. Perhaps, as compensation, she was, for a brief time, on the Board of Directors for the Danish island of Møen (now Møn, then a Royal possession south of Copenhagen, in the Baltic Sea. In 1664 she called the island “Forvalterske” [Management].

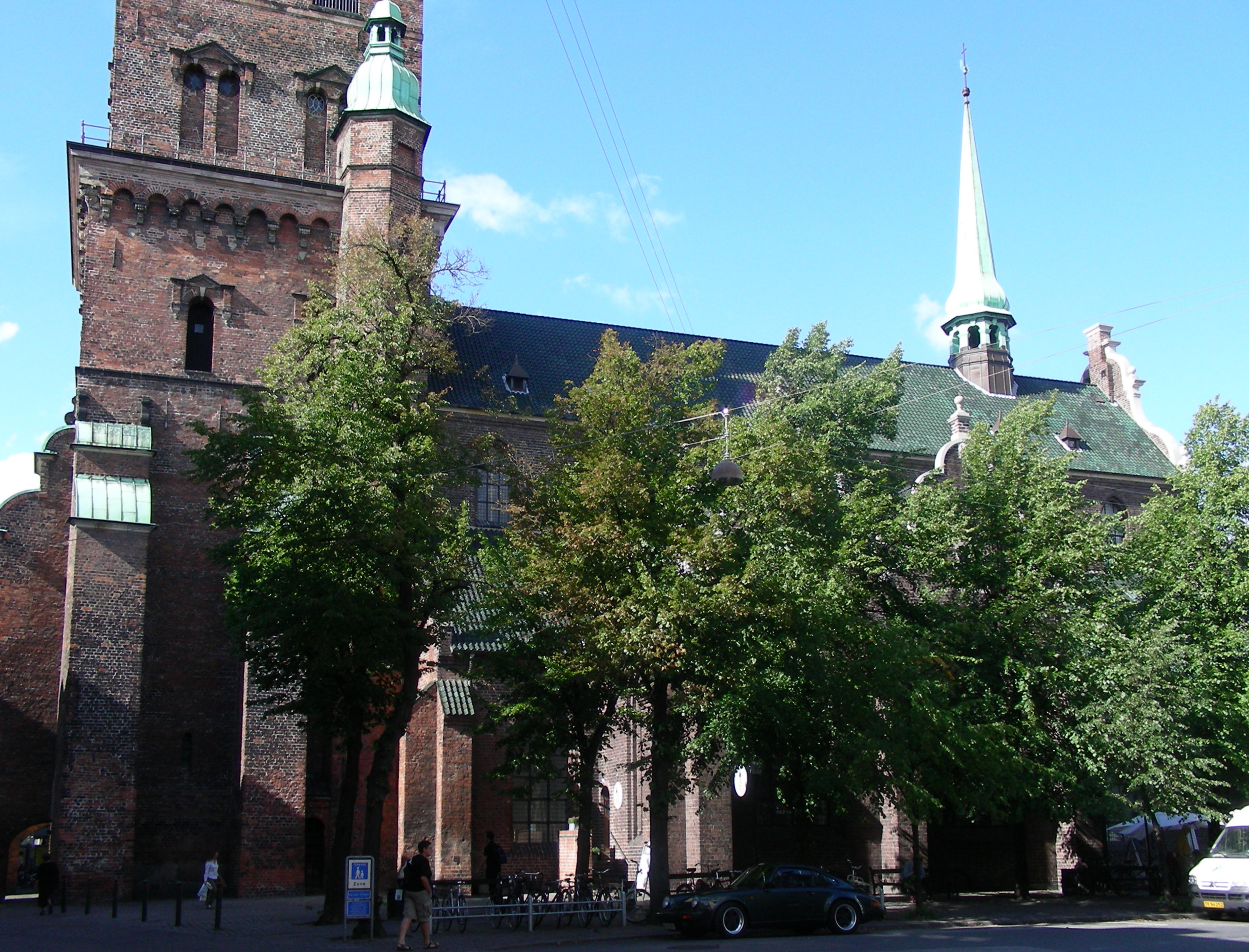
St. Nicolai Kirke [St. Nicholas Church], now the Kunsthallen Nikolaj [Nikolaj Contemporary Art Center], in Copenhagen

=== Eyesight ===
A family tradition tells that an eye surgery in 1653 restored her sight after she had been deprived of it for 37 years, but there may be reasons to doubt the reliability of this report.

=== Death ===
In 1673, Andersdatter died in Copenhagen. Andersdatter was buried next to her daughters at the Sankt Nicolai Kirke [St. Nicholas Church] in Copenhagen. A portrait of her is said to have hung inside this church as late as 1779 but it is apparently now lost, probably to the fire of 1795 that almost destroyed the church. Hven was afterwards passed to her only surviving child, Hans Ulrik Gyldenløve.

== See also ==
- Copenhagen Fire of 1795

== Literature ==
- (da) Lars Bisgaard, Claus Bjørn, Michael Bregnsbo, Merete Harding, Kurt Villads Jensen, Knud J. V. Jespersen: Danmarks Konger og Dronninger [Kings and Queens of Denmark]. Copenhagen, Gyldendal Boghandels, 2004
- (da) Carl Frederik Bricka, “Andersdatter, Karen”, Dansk Biografisk Lexikon, Tillige Omfattende, Norge for Tidsrummet 1537-1814, 1. Bind, Aaberg-Beaumelle [Danish Biographical Dictionary, Comprehensive Addition, Norway for the Period 1537-1814, 1st Volume, Aaberg-Beaumelle]. Copenhagen, Gyldendalske Boghandels [Gyldendal Publications], 1887), page 216 at the Runeberg Project
- (da) Carl Frederik Bricka and Julius Albert Fridericia, Kong Christian den fjords egenhændige breve, Bind 3, 1632-1635 [Handwritten Letters of King Christian the Fourth, Volume 3, 1632-1635]. Copenhagen, Rudolph Klein, 1878-1880, pp 130, 177 and 413
- (da) Johannes Nikolai Høst, Christian den fjerde: Danmarks go Norges store konge [Christian the Fourth: The Great King of Denmark and Norway] (Copenhagen, Alvild Th. Høst, 1839), pp. 195–198
- (da) Prof. Abraham Kall, “Eterretninger om Fru Karen Andersdatter, samt Christian den Fierdes Bindebrev til hende” [Information about Karen Andersdatter and Christian the Fourth's Written Promise to Her]. In: Nye Danske Magazine [New Danish Magazine], Andet Binds Forste Hefte [2nd Volume, 1st Issue], Copenhagen, Det Kongelige Danske Selskab til den Nordiske Histories og Sprogs Forbedring [The Royal Danish Society for Nordic History and Language Improvement], 1806, pp. 1-8
