= Iluileq Fjord =

Fjord in Greenland

Iluileq
- Danell Fjord
- Location in Greenland
- Interactive map of Iluileq
- Location: Arctic (SE Greenland)
- Coordinates: 60°52′N 43°4′W
- Ocean/sea sources: North Atlantic Ocean
- Basin countries: Greenland
- Max. length: 53 km (33 mi)
- Max. width: 3.2 km (2.0 mi)

Iluileq (Danish: Danell Fjord) is a fjord in the King Frederick VI Coast, Kujalleq municipality, southern Greenland.

This fjord was named by Wilhelm August Graah after David Danell, a Dutchman who made three expeditions to Greenland in 1652-54 sent by King Frederick III of Denmark.

== Geography ==
Iluileq Fjord extends in a roughly east–west direction for about 55 km between Kangerluluk to the north and Paatusoq to the south, the latter being much closer and running parallel to it. To the east the fjord opens into the North Atlantic Ocean where the large Iluileq island lies on the northern side of its mouth rising to a height of 829 m (2,720 ft). The fjord has a large active glacier at its head and its inner section is almost always encumbered with ice floes.

Iluileq has two short branches on its southern coast, about 2 km and 6 km from the fjord's mouth respectively. The first is very narrow. On its northern coast there is the sound separating Iluileq island from the mainland, as well as two branches with glaciers reaching down to the waterline.

=== Mountains ===
There are mountains on both sides of the fjord rising steeply from the shore to heights of about 1,000 m (3,300 ft) in the inner section of the fjord.

To the north of the fjord rise the Graah Mountains (Graah Fjelde) and close to the head of the fjord, at 61°0′55″N 43°37′53″W, there is a massive mountain reaching a height of 1,877 m (6,158 ft).

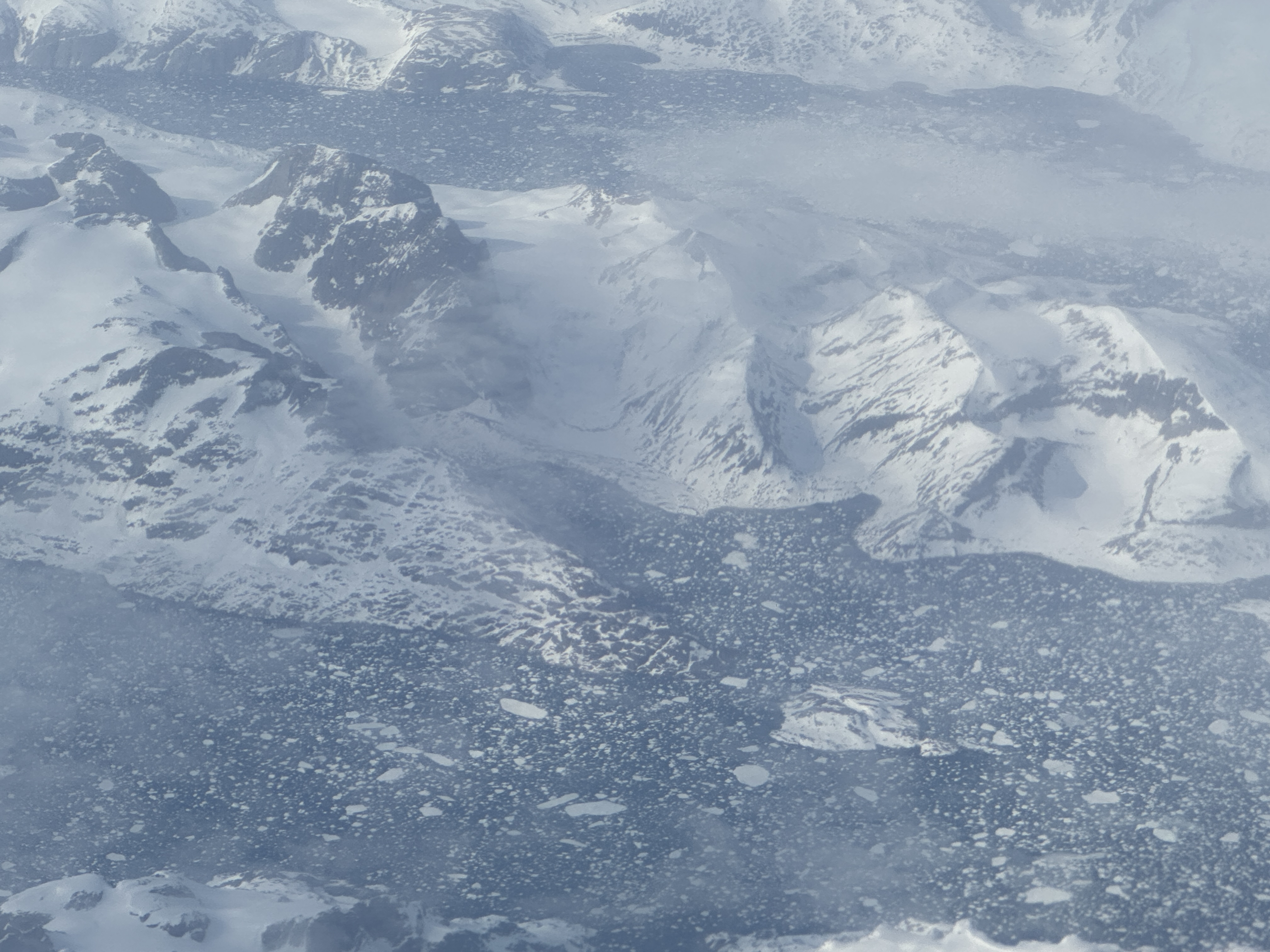
Iluileq Fjord in 2026

== See also ==
- List of fjords of Greenland
