= Toni Dürnberger =

Austrian mountaineer and expedition leader

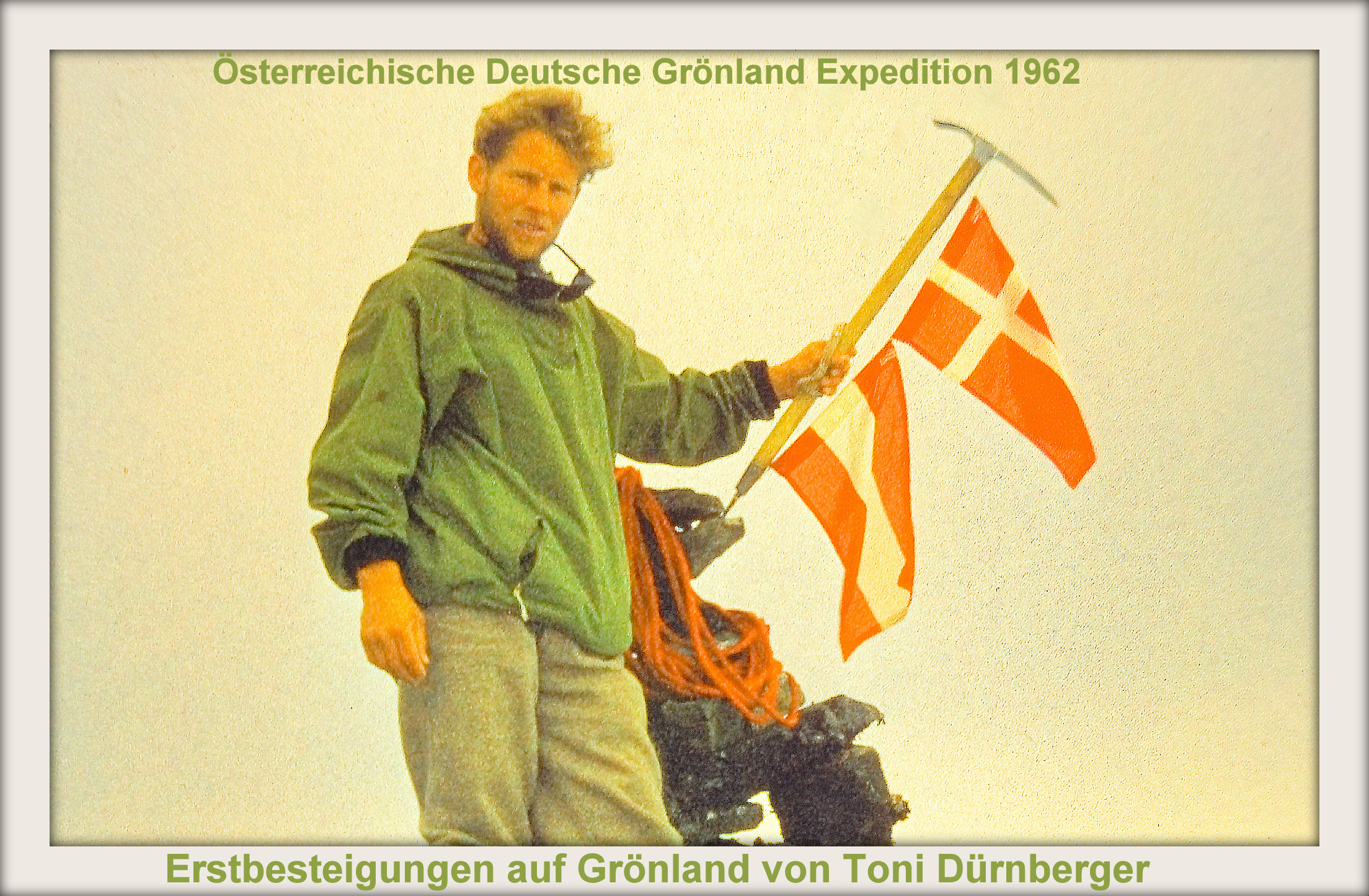
- Born: 11 September 1932; Sankt Martin bei Lofer, Austria
- Died: 17 August 1992 (aged 59); Khan Tengri, Tian Shan

Toni Dürnberger (11 September 1932 – 17 August 1992) was an Austrian mountaineer and expedition leader.

== Biography ==
From April to July 1962, Dürnberger led the Austro-German Expedition to Greenland (Österreichische Deutsche Grönland Expedition 1962) that climbed a number of unscaled peaks in the Sermilik sector from April to July 1962. The expedition climbed a total of 37 peaks in the area, including some near the Southern Sermilik fjord.

In 1966 Dürnberger led a second expedition that climbed for the first time remote Mount Paatusoq, considered the highest unclimbed peak in southern Greenland. Battling very difficult conditions, some of the team members fell into a crevasse and one of them was seriously injured.

Together with Austrian expedition member Ernst Herzinger and German members Stefan Rausch and Alois Häusl, Toni Dürnberger published articles of geographical interest on the little-known areas of Greenland he visited.

Toni Dürnberger died in a fall, together with his wife Elfi, while descending Khan Tengri after having successfully climbed the 7,010m high peak located in the Kyrgyzstan–Kazakhstan–China border on 17 August 1992.

== Publications ==
- Dürnberger T. et al. Erlebnisbericht über die Österreichisch-Deutsche Grönlandexpedition 1962. Jahrbuch des Österreichischen Alpenvereins 1963. Vol 88.
