= Fridtjof Nansen Peninsula =

Peninsula in Sermersooq, Greenland

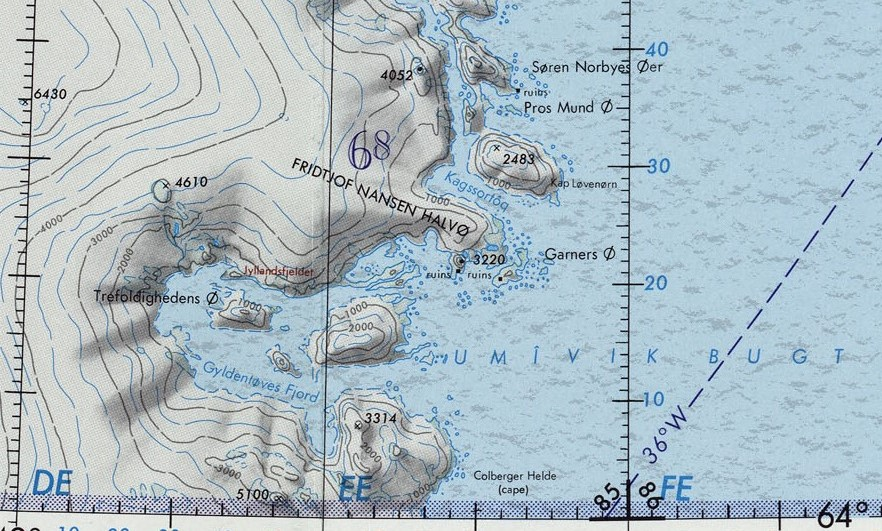
- Map of Greenland section showing the Fridtjof Nansen Peninsula

- Location within Greenland

Geography
- Location: Southeast Greenland
- Coordinates: 64°25′N 40°35′W
- Adjacent to: Umivik Bay Irminger Sea; Pikiulleq

Administration
- Greenland (Denmark)
- Municipality: Sermersooq

Demographics
- Population: 0

Fridtjof Nansen Peninsula (Danish: Fridtjof Nansens Halvø) is a peninsula in the King Frederick VI Coast, southeastern Greenland. It is a part of the Sermersooq municipality.

== Geography ==
The Fridtjof Nansen Peninsula is limited to the northeast by a strait across which lie the Søren Norby Islands, beyond which lies the bay of Pikiulleq. To the southeast it is bound by the Irminger Sea and to the southwest by Umivik Bay, with two large islands, Upernattivik (Upernarsuak) and Trefoldigheden off the shore.

To the west and the northwest the peninsula is attached to the mainland. Several small islands where there are Paleo-Eskimo archaeological sites lie off its southeastern point.

== See also ==
- Fridtjof Nansen: The Crossing of Greenland
- Tunumiit
