= Peder Olsen Walløe =

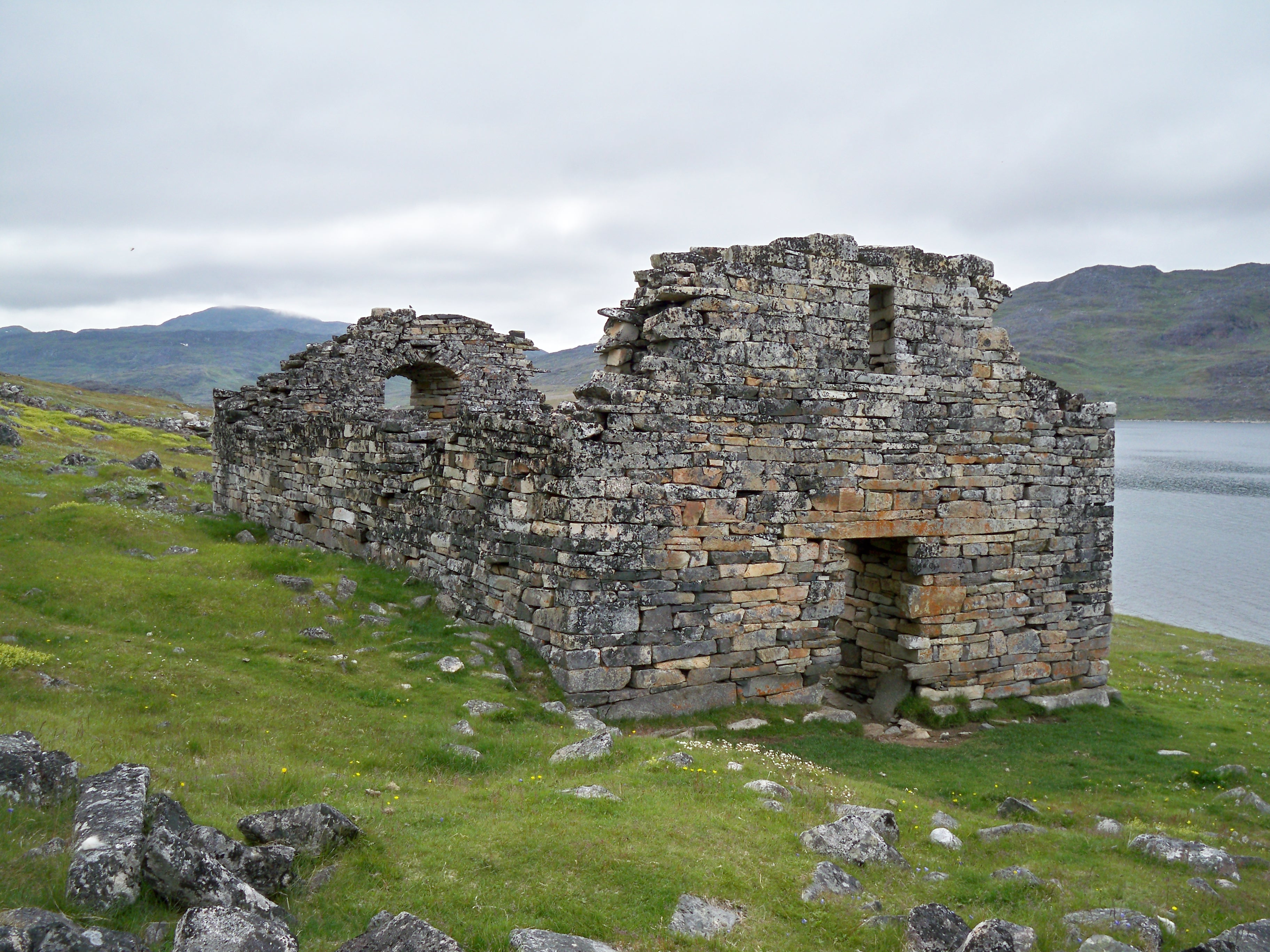
Ruins of the Norse Hvalsey Church.

Peder Olsen Walløe (1716 – 27 April 1793) was a Danish Arctic explorer most noted for his historic exploration of the former Norse settlements on Greenland.

== Biography ==
Peder Olsen Walloe was born on the Baltic Sea island of Bornholm. In 1739, he came to Greenland as one of five colonists called by Lutheran missionary Hans Egede. He learned to speak the Kalaallisut language and settled as a trader with permission to operate outside the Godthåb colony. During 1751–53, Walløe explored the southern coasts of Greenland on behalf of the Danish mission. The aim was to locate the lost Eastern Norse Settlement which was commonly believed to be located on the east coast of Greenland. In August 1751, Walloe left Godthaab in a native boat accompanied by two Danish sailors and two Inuit rowers. The expedition used umiaks able to navigate in the shallow waters between the coast and the sea ice.

The first year he reached what became Julianehåb District where he made certain explorations and spent the winter. On their way southwards he investigated the area of Tunulliarfik Fjord and Hvalsey, which contained the remains of earlier Norse settlements. The next year he passed Cape Farewell and worked a little way up the unmapped east coast to an island which he called Nenese (Nanuuseq). Walløe constantly struggled with drift-ice and bad weather while navigating along the coast.

Walloe is the first European in modern times who is known with certainty to have landed on the southern part of the east coast. Walløe then settled in Denmark and never returned to Greenland. He subsequently wrote down reliable and authentic records of the natural and ice conditions on the East Coast. Walløe was the first European who has given a description of the nature and climate of southern Greenland, of the great ice occurrence and the great difficulties ice present in the way of movement of goods in these districts. His diaries contain information about the country's population and threw light on the conditions under which colonists in Greenland lived during his time.

Peder Olsen Walløe never received any recognition for his achievement and reaped little profit from his enterprise and perseverance. Afterwards he lived in most miserable circumstances, dying at the age of seventy-seven in the workhouse of the Vartov Church Hospital at Copenhagen.

Peder Olsen Walløe's diaries were published during 1927 in the abstracts by noted Danish archivist and historian Louis Theodor Alfred Bobé (1867-1951). Dr. Louis Bobé was a professor at the University of Copenhagen, chairman of the Greenlandic Society (Grønlandske selskabs) (1921-1924) and was appointed Royal Danish historian in 1921.

Cape Walløe in Southeast Greenland was named after him.

== See also ==
- Cartographic expeditions to Greenland
- List of Arctic expeditions
