= Ikertivaq =

Fjord near Dannebrog Island, Greenland

- Ikersuaq
- Location in Greenland
- Location: Arctic (SE Greenland)
- Coordinates: 65°29′N 39°38′W
- Ocean/sea sources: North Atlantic Ocean
- Basin countries: Greenland
- Max. length: 20 km (12 mi)
- Max. width: 18 km (11 mi)

Ikertivaq, also known as Ikersuaq or Ikerssuaq, is a bay or fjord in Sermersooq municipality, southeastern Greenland. Tundra climate prevails in the area of the fjord, the average annual temperature in the area being -8 °C . The warmest month is July when the average temperature rises to 0 °C and the coldest is January with -14 °C.

This fjord has been labeled as one of the most dangerous fjords in the area because of the abundance of pack ice. Large ice floes encumber its entrance, blocking the fjord and keeping the calf ice inside.

== Geography ==
Ikersuaq extends in a roughly northwest–southeast direction for about 20 km. It is divided into a number of inlets or fjord branches with large active glaciers at their heads. To the south the bay opens into the North Atlantic Ocean between Dannebrog and Suunikajik islands. The fjord has been described also as a sound.

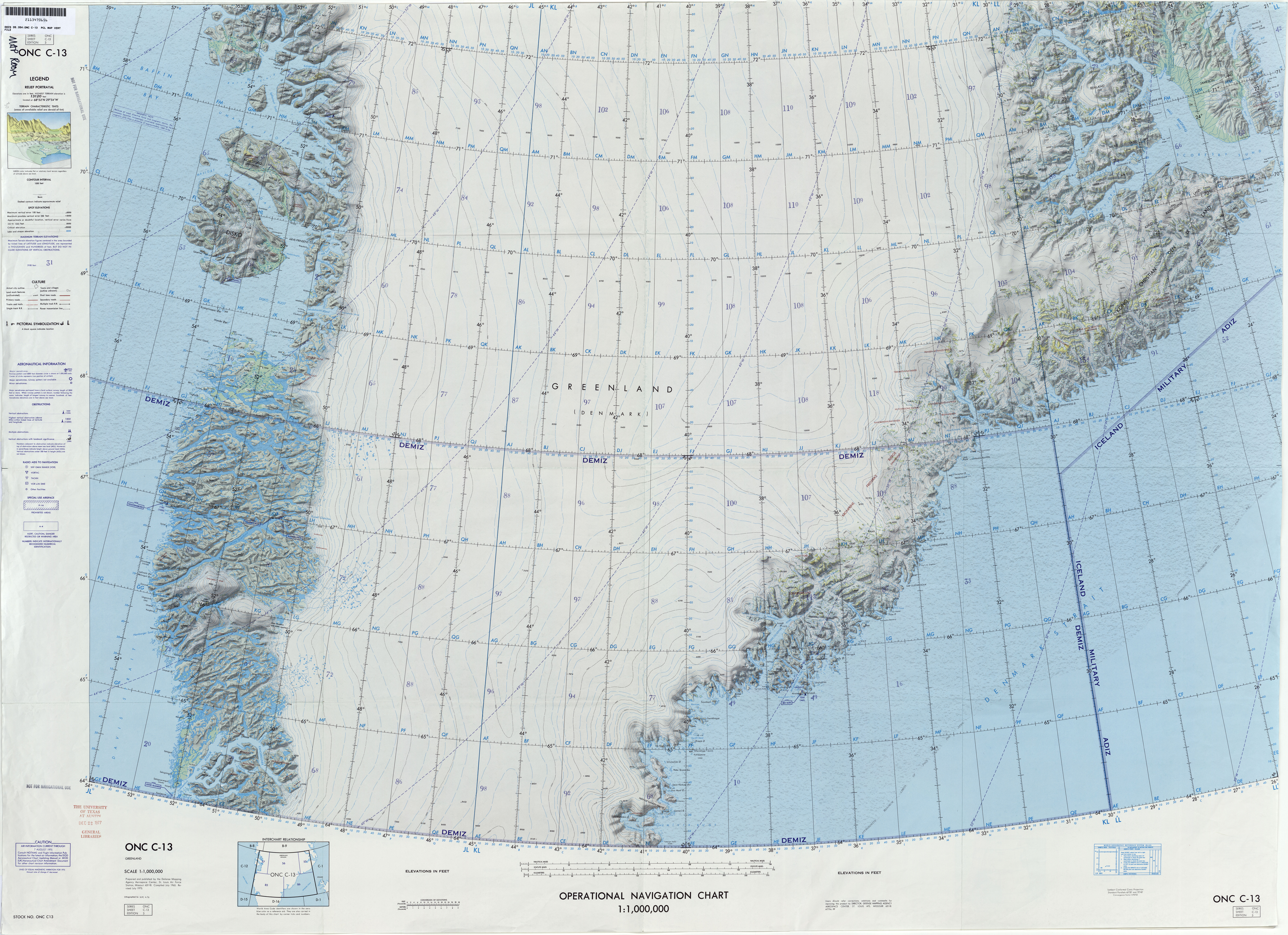
Map of Greenland section

== See also ==
- List of fjords of Greenland
