= Graah Mountains =

Mountain range in Greenland

- Graah Fjelde
- Location within Greenland

Highest point
- Elevation: 1,887 m (6,191 ft)

Geography
- Country: Greenland
- Range coordinates: 61°0′N 43°0′W

The Graah Mountains (Danish: Graah Fjelde or Graah Bjerge) are a mountain range in southeastern Greenland. Administratively this range is part of the Kujalleq municipality.

This mountain group was named after Wilhelm August Graah, who described them for the first time during his 1829 expedition to the little known eastern coast of Greenland in search of the lost Eastern Norse Settlement. The area of the range is currently uninhabited.

== Geography ==
The Graah Mountains are relatively little glaciated craggy and steep nunataks rising above the glaciers in the King Frederick VI Coast. The range runs roughly from east to west from the Irminger Sea coast to the Greenland ice sheet west of Kangerluk Fjord, between Kangerluluk Fjord in the north and Iluileq Fjord (Danell Fjord) in the south. The highest elevation of the range is located at its western end close to the head of Iluileq Fjord, at 61°0′55″N 43°37′53″W.

Graah described this group of mountains from the coast in the following terms:

Above those glaciers, however, rises a chain of mountains, forming a solitary exception to the uniform appearance of the country round, and no less remarkable for their beauty of contour, than for their height, which, I should think, must be upwards of 3000 feet, while the rest of the country, hereabouts, falls considerably short of half that elevation.

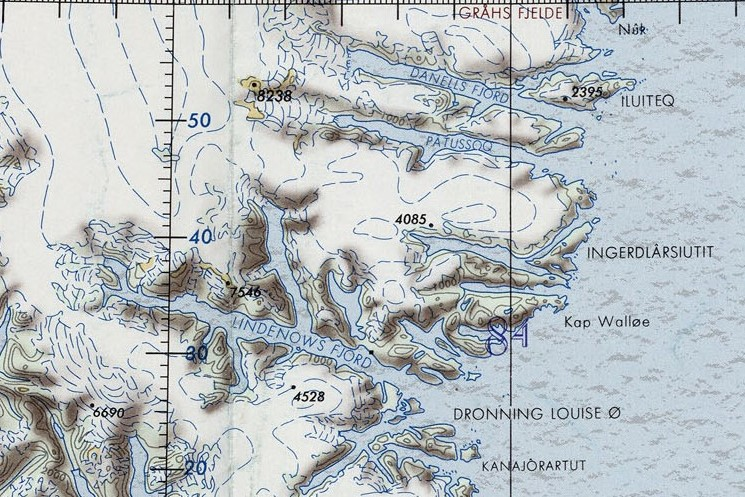
Map of Greenland section showing Danell Fjord (Iluileq) and the Graah Mountains (Grahs Fjelde) at the top edge.

== See also ==
- List of mountain ranges of Greenland
- List of Nunataks#Greenland
- Amphibolite
