= Upernattivik =

Island in Greenland

Upernattivik Upernarsuak
- Location within Greenland

Geography
- Location: North Atlantic Ocean; Southeastern Greenland
- Coordinates: 64°14′N 40°51′W
- Area: 149 km^{2} (58 sq mi)
- Length: 18 km (11.2 mi)
- Width: 11 km (6.8 mi)
- Highest elevation: 617 m (2024 ft)

Administration
- Greenland
- Municipality: Sermersooq

Demographics
- Population: 0

Upernattivik – also known as Upernarsuak – is an uninhabited island in King Frederick VI Coast, southeastern Greenland. Administratively it is part of the Sermersooq municipality.

== Geography ==
Upernattivik is a coastal island in Umivik Bay, located between the Fridtjof Nansen Peninsula to the north and the Odinland Peninsula to the south. The Torsukattak is an 800 metres (2,625 feet) wide sound that separates the island from the mainland in the north and the broader Umiiviip Kangertiva Fjord is located to the south.

The island is 18 kilometres (11 miles) long with a maximum width of 11 kilometres (7 miles). There are some smaller islands in its vicinity, such as Trefoldigheden, Terne Island and Tre Lover to the west and Pikiitsi off its eastern point.

== See also ==
- List of islands of Greenland
