= Søren Norby Islands =

Archipelago in Greenland

Søren Norbyes Øer
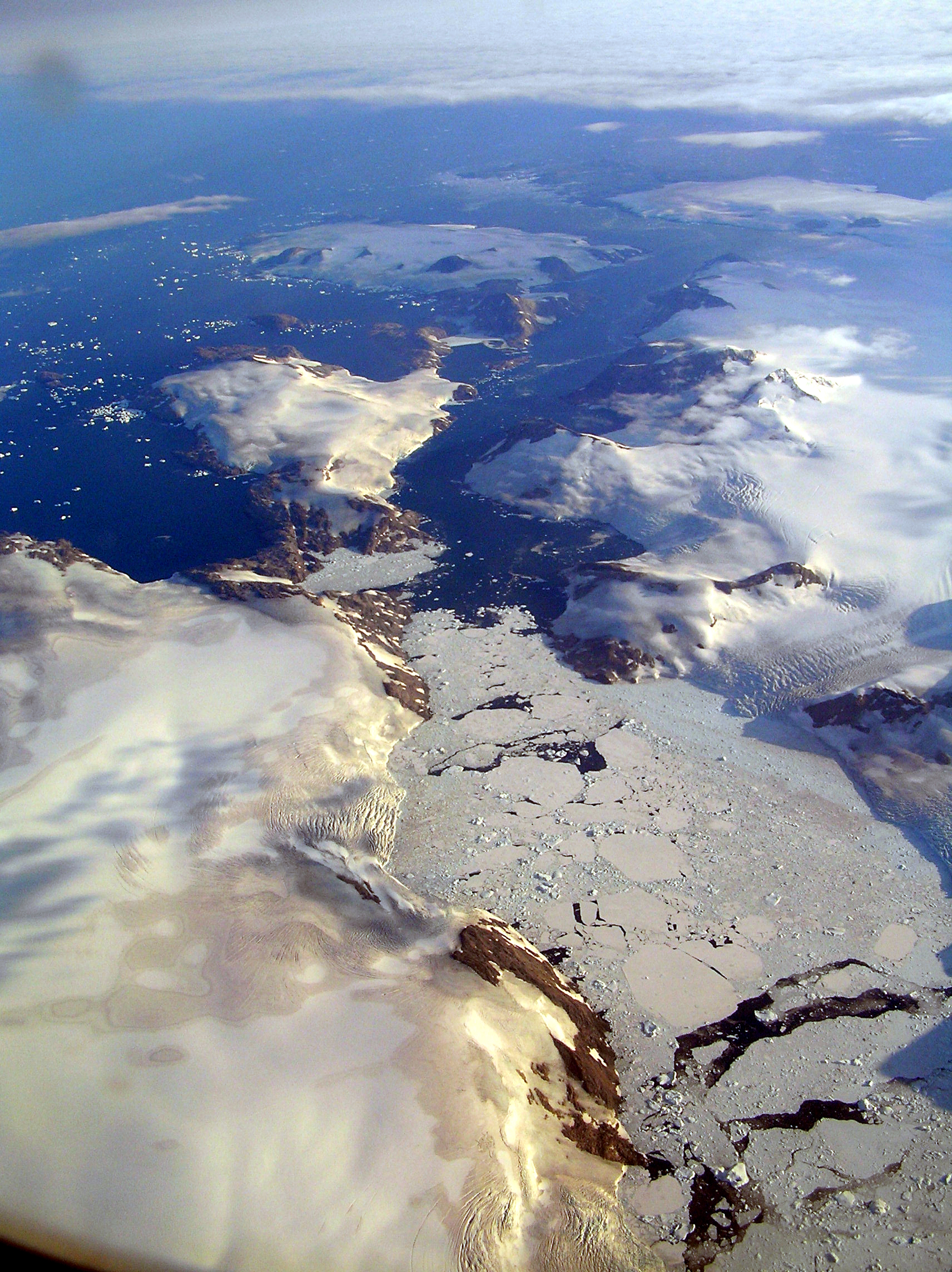
- Aerial view of the Søren Norby Islands (left), view to the south

- Location within Greenland

Geography
- Location: North Atlantic Ocean; Southeastern Greenland
- Coordinates: 64°34′N 40°20′W
- Area: 470.7 km^{2} (181.7 sq mi)
- Length: 61 km (37.9 mi)
- Width: 7.6 km (4.72 mi)
- Highest elevation: 756 m (2480 ft)

Administration
- Greenland
- Municipality: Sermersooq

Demographics
- Population: 0

Søren Norby Islands (Danish: Søren Norbyes Øer), named after Søren Norby, is an uninhabited archipelago close to the shores of Eastern Greenland. Administratively it is part of the Sermersooq municipality.

== Geography ==
The archipelago is located on the southern side of Pikiulleq Bay. It includes a long coastal island and a great number of offshore islets and rocks, the largest of which is Pros Mund Island.

The main island, Jens Munk Island is located north of the Fridtjof Nansen Peninsula, separated from the mainland by a 45 km long sound named Kagssortoq (Kattertooq), which has a width ranging between 0.7 and 6.5 km. The southern part of the island has an ice cap.

Jens Munk Island has an area of 470.7 km^{2} and a shoreline of 185.9 kilometres. Its southernmost point is Cape Lovelorn, projecting from a steep 280 m high headland at the northern limit of Umivik Bay.

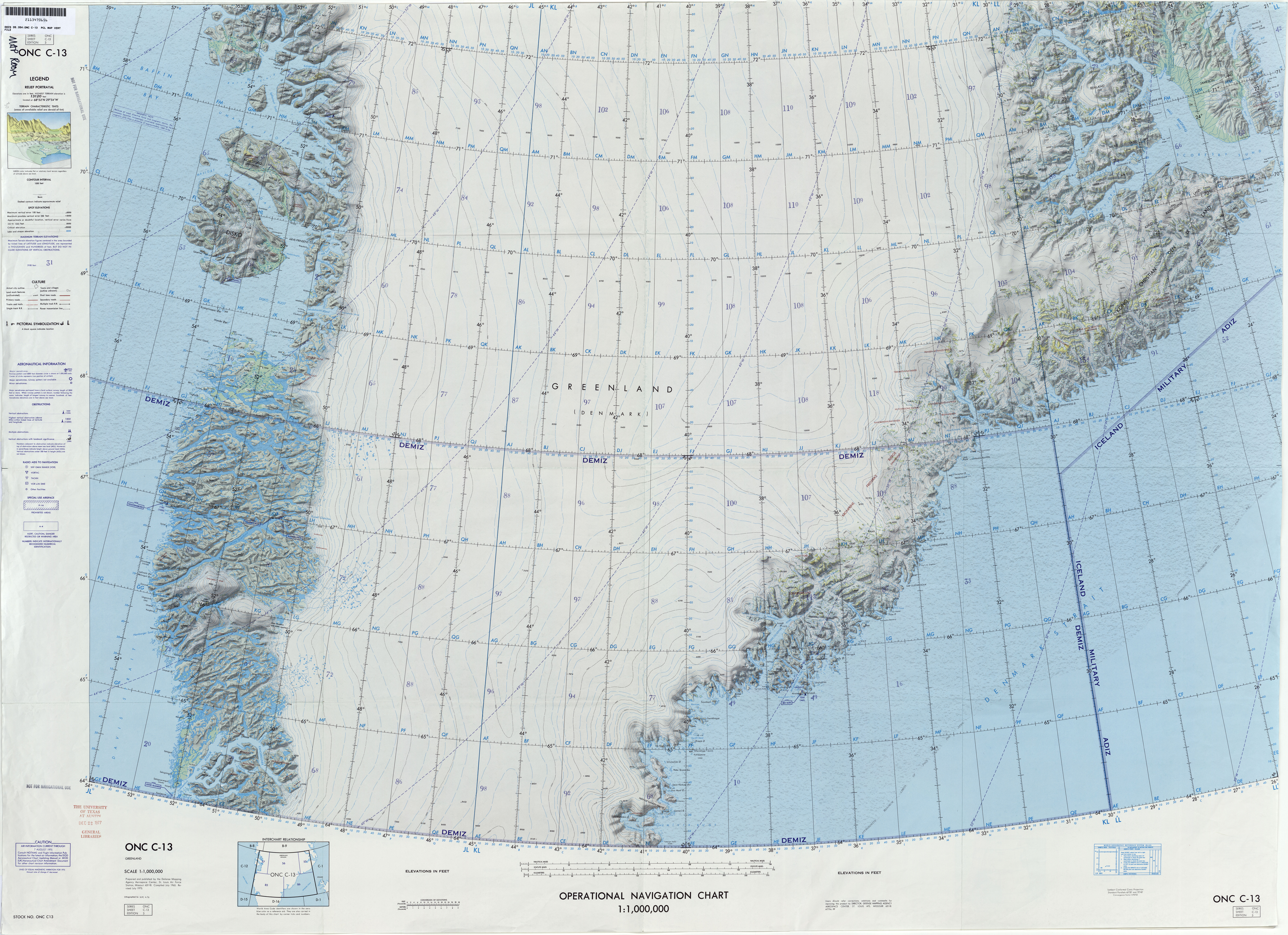
Map of Greenland section.

== See also ==
- List of islands of Greenland
