= Puisortoq =

Glacier in Greenland

- Location within Greenland
- Type: Tidewater glacier
- Location: Greenland
- Coordinates: 61°57′N 42°17′W
- Thickness: 569 m (1,867 ft)
- Terminus: North Atlantic Ocean

Puisortoq is a glacier on the east coast of Greenland. It has been in a status of retreat for the past years.

It is a very active glacier protruding into the sea and discharging great amounts of ice, making navigation along the coast dangerous.

== Geography ==
Puisortoq is located in the King Frederick VI Coast, the remote and uninhabited southeastern shore of Greenland. It protrudes into the sea south of Cape Steen Bille and north of Cape Cort Adelaer, forming a large and nearly 200 m (660 ft) high icy cliff.

This glacier was dreaded by the Inuit because large fragments of ice would break underwater and shoot to the surface like projectiles, hence its name meaning "where the ice rises to the surface". The local Inuit advised Gino Watkins:

... Do not speak, do not eat, until Puisortoq is passed.

== See also ==
- List of glaciers in Greenland
