= Pikiulleq =

Bay in Greenland

- Location in Greenland
- Location: Arctic
- Coordinates: 65°0′N 40°36′W
- Ocean/sea sources: North Atlantic Ocean
- Basin countries: Greenland
- Max. length: 35 km (22 mi)
- Max. width: 23 km (14 mi)

Pikiulleq is a bay in eastern Greenland. It is part of the Sermersooq municipality.

== Geography ==
Pikiulleq Bay is located at the northern end of King Frederick VI Coast, north of the Fridtjof Nansen Peninsula and to the north of the Søren Norby Islands. Past the northeastern end of the bay, at the southern limit of King Christian IX Land, the coast of eastern Greenland bends in a northeastward direction that stays quite regular until Cape Brewster. In the inner part of the bay there are small fjords, the Havhesten Bay in the south, the Køge Bay (Ikeq) in the west, and the Uvkusigssaqarfik fjord in the north, past the Pamialluk headland. All these fjords have glaciers at their heads.

Off the coast, on the southern side of the mouth of the bay lies small Putugua island. In the NE part of the bay there are larger islands, the largest of which is Romer Island (Rømer Ø), southeast of which is smaller Ole Romer Island (Ole Rømer Ø) lying closer to the middle of the mouth of the bay. Further to the east of the bay there are many small coastal islands, as well as the fjord named "Comanche Bay" during WWII.

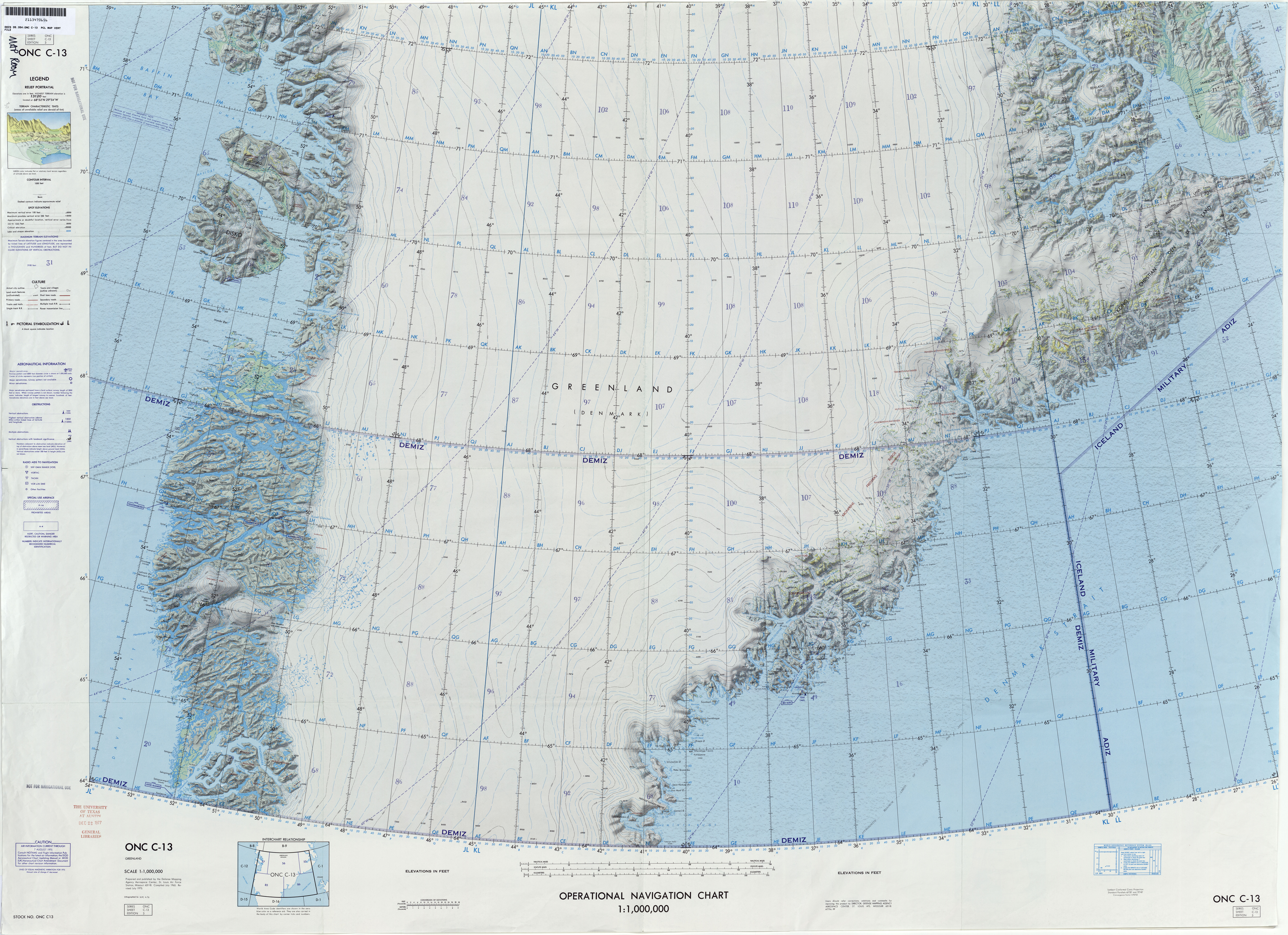
Map of Greenland section

== See also ==
- Fridtjof Nansen: The Crossing of Greenland
- Søren Norby Islands
