= Wilhelm August Graah =

Danish naval officer and Arctic explorer

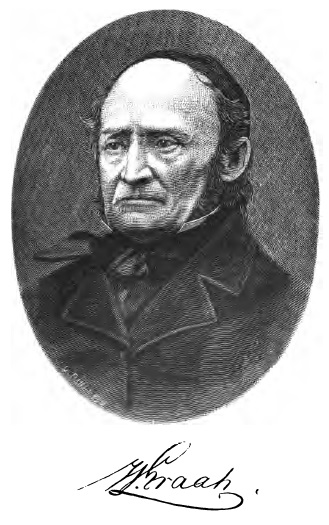
- Born: 24 May 1793; Copenhagen, Denmark
- Died: 16 September 1863 (aged 70) Copenhagen, Denmark
- Allegiance: Denmark
- Branch: Royal Danish Navy
- Service years: 1811–1850
- Rank: Captain
- Awards: Knight's Cross of the Order of the Dannebrog

Wilhelm August Graah (1793–1863) was a Danish naval officer and Arctic explorer. He is best known for his expedition to the eastern coast of Greenland. The Graah Mountains, Graah Fjord, and Cape Graah in King Christian X Land are named after him.

As part of the Royal Danish Navy, Graah helped map the coastlines of Iceland and West Greenland. In 1828–30, was sent by King Frederick VI of Denmark on an expedition to the unmapped eastern coast with the purpose to search for the lost Eastern Norse Settlement.

He commanded a ship charting the waters of the Danish West Indies in the 1830s before being promoted to the rank of Captain and retiring from the navy in 1841.

== Early life ==
Graah was born on 24 October at Fødselsstiftelsen in Copenhagen, the son of Supreme Court justice Peder Hersleb Graah (1750–1830) and Eleonora Sophie Beck (1759–1829). His paternal grandfather was the government official Andreas Jacobsen G. (1701–1780). His maternal grandfather was the planter and government official Jens Michelsen Beck.

== Career ==
=== Early career ===
Graah enrolled at the Royal Danish Naval Academy in an early age. He became a second lieutenant in 1813 and a first lieutenant in 1820. In 1919, he published Udkast til Danmarks Søekrigshistorie. In 1821, he was sent to Iceland to complete the mapping of the coastline (especially Berufjord and its surroundings). In 1823–1824, he was sent to West Greenland to map the coastline. The winter was spent in Godhavn. In 1825, he published Beskrivelse til det voxende Situations-Kaart over den vestlige Kyst af Grønland. In 1826–1827, he was stationed at the Eider.

=== 1828–1831 Danish East Greenland Expedition ===
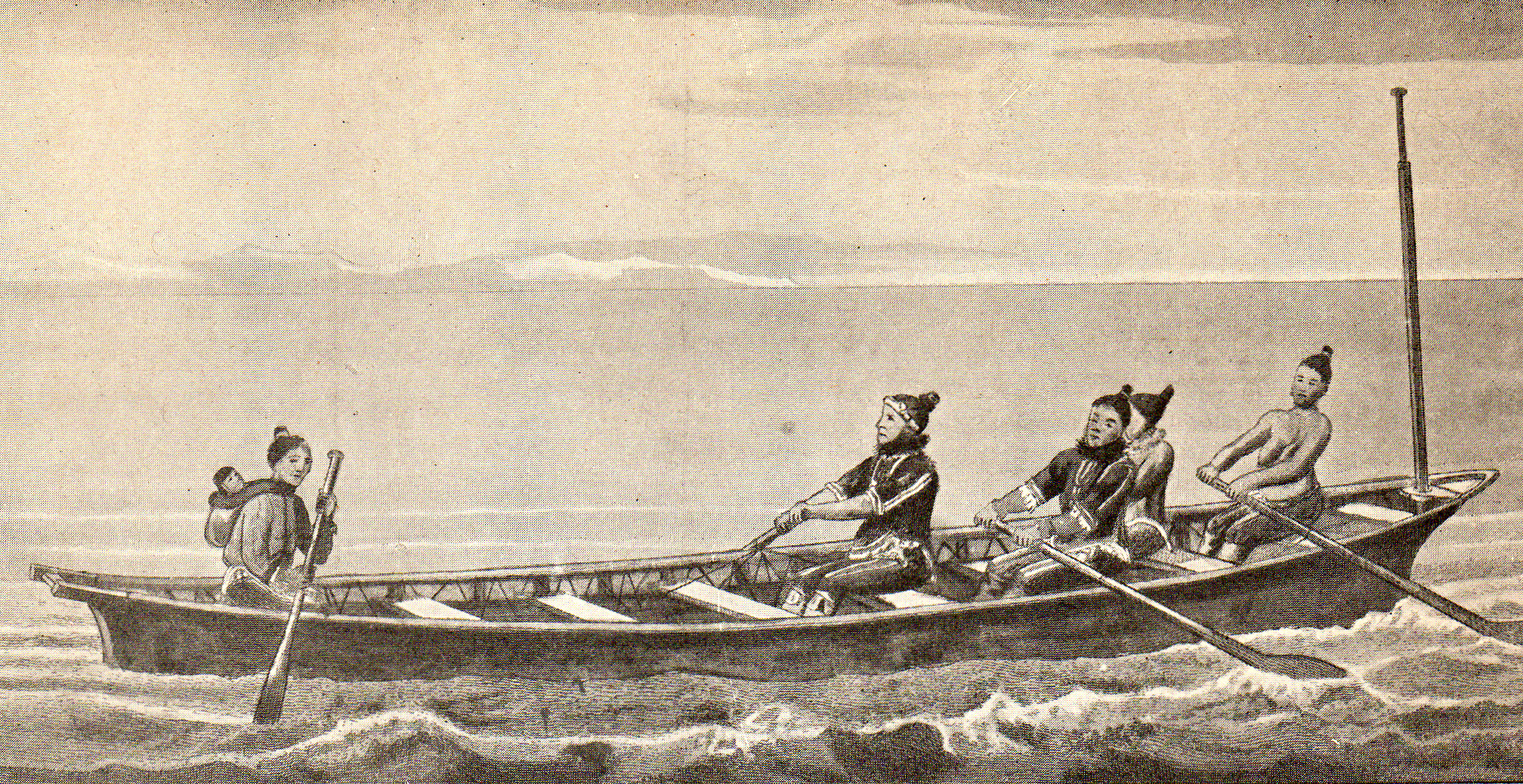
Drawing by H.G.F. Holm representing one of the umiaks of Graah's expedition.

In 1828, Graah was charged with heading an expedition to East Greenland. The brig HDMS Hvalfisken set out from Copenhagen in the brig Hvalfisken, but—once arrived in Greenland—used umiaks able to navigate in the waters between the coast and the sea ice of southeastern Greenland. In 1829, the expedition reached Dannebrog Island (65° 18' N), where it was stopped by ice. They wintered at Nugarlik (63° 22' N) and returned to the settlements on the west coast of Greenland in 1830. Two naturalists participated - the geologist Christian Pingel and the botanist Jens Vahl. Graah published an account of the exploration.

Graah named the southeastern coast of Greenland King Frederick VI Coast and mapped about 550 km of formerly uncharted territory. Although he had been asked to reach 69°, Graah fell short of his goal of going further north owing to innumerable hardships. He made numerous contacts with the now extinct Southeast-Greenland Inuit, describing in detail some of their customs and way of life.

=== Later career ===
After his return to Copenhagen, Graah was appointed as one of the directors of the Royal Graanland Trading Department. He kept this post until 1850. In 1837–1838, Graah was sent to the Danish West Indies as first-in-command of the brig St. Thomas. He created a new nautical chart of the local waters. He say promotion to captain in 1840 but left the navy in 1841.

== Personal life ==
On 9 February 1832, at Holmen Church in Copenhagen, Graah married Maren Cathrine West (1810–1879). She was a daughter of captain Johannes West (1771–1835) and Ane Elisabeth Fuchs (1779–1844).

== Legacy ==
Graah was created a Knight of the Order of the Dannebrog in 1831. The Graah Mountains (Graah Fjelde) and Graah Fjord in the King Frederick VI Coast of SE Greenland, as well as Cape Graah in King Christian X Land were named after him.

== See also ==
- Cartographic expeditions to Greenland
- List of Arctic expeditions

== Literature ==
- English translation, Narrative of an Expedition to the East Coast of Greenland, London, 1837.
