= List of islands of Greenland by area =

This is a list of the islands of Greenland by area. It includes all islands in Greenland greater than 100 km^{2} (39 sq mi), sorted in descending order by area.

== List of islands ==
=== Islands 1,000 km^{2} (390 mi^{2}) and greater ===
| Rank | Name | Greenlandic name | Area | Municipality |
|---|---|---|---|---|
| 1 | Greenland | Kalaallit Nunaat | 2,175,035 km^{2} (839,786 mi^{2}) | |
| 2 | Disko Island | Qeqertarsuaq | 8,578 km^{2} (3,312 mi^{2}) | Qeqertalik |
| 3 | Milne Land | Ilimananngip Nunaa | 3,913 km^{2} (1,511 mi^{2}) | Sermersooq |
| 4 | Traill Island | Traill Ø | 3,542 km^{2} (1,368 mi^{2}) | Northeast Greenland National Park |
| 5 | Ymer Island | Ymer Ø | 2,437 km^{2} (941 mi^{2}) | Northeast Greenland National Park |
| 6 | Geographical Society Island | Geografisk Samfund Ø | 1,717 km^{2} (663 mi^{2}) | Northeast Greenland National Park |
| 7 | Hovgaard Island | Hovgaard Ø | 1,692 km^{2} (653 mi^{2}) | Northeast Greenland National Park |
| 8 | Clavering Island | Clavering Ø | 1,535 km^{2} (593 mi^{2}) | Northeast Greenland National Park |
| 9 | Nares Land | | 1,466 km^{2} (566 mi^{2}) | Northeast Greenland National Park |
| 10 | Shannon Island | Shannon Ø | 1,259 km^{2} (486 mi^{2}) | Northeast Greenland National Park |

=== Islands between 1,000 km^{2} (390 mi^{2}) and 250 km^{2} (97 mi^{2}) ===
| Rank | Name | Greenlandic name | Area | Municipality |
|---|---|---|---|---|
| 11 | Ammassalik Island | Ammassalik Ø | 699 km^{2} (270 mi^{2}) | Sermersooq |
| 12 | Christian IV Island | Sammisoq | 659 km^{2} (254 mi^{2}) | Kujalleq |
| 13 | Kuhn Island | Kuhn Ø | 634 km^{2} (245 mi^{2}) | Northeast Greenland National Park |
| 14 | Alluttoq Island | Arveprinsen Ejland | 626 km^{2} (242 mi^{2}) | Avannaata |
| 15 | Hendrik Island | Hendrik Island Ø | 583 km^{2} (225 mi^{2}) | Northeast Greenland National Park |
| 16 | Store Koldewey | Store Koldewey | 564 km^{2} (218 mi^{2}) | Northeast Greenland National Park |
| 17 | Upernivik Island | Upernivik Ø | 503 km^{2} (194 mi^{2}) | Avannaata |
| 18 | Jens Munk Island | Søren Norbyes Ø | 471 km^{2} (182 mi^{2}) | Sermersooq |
| 19 | Skjoldungen | Saqqisikuik | 450 km^{2} (170 mi^{2}) | Sermersooq |
| 20 | Sverdrup Island | Sverdrup Ø | 436 km^{2} (168 mi^{2}) | Northeast Greenland National Park |
| 21 | Illorsuit Island | Illorsuip qeqertaat | 403 km^{2} (156 mi^{2}) | Avannaata |
| 22 | Nutaarmiut Island | Nutaarmiut | 354 km^{2} (137 mi^{2}) | Avannaata |
| 23 | Permin Land | | 324 km^{2} (125 mi^{2}) | Northeast Greenland National Park |
| 24 | Princess Thyra Island | Prinsesse Thyra Ø | 314 km^{2} (121 mi^{2}) | Northeast Greenland National Park |
| 25 | Egger Island | Itilleq | 308 km^{2} (119 mi^{2}) | Kujalleq |
| 26 | Northumberland Island | Kiatak | 277 km^{2} (107 mi^{2}) | Avannaata |
| 27 | Nunarsuit | Nunarsuit | 274 km^{2} (106 mi^{2}) | Kujalleq |
| 28 | Qeqertarsuaq Island | Storø | 266 km^{2} (103 mi^{2}) | Sermersooq |
| 29 | Qeqertaq Island | Qeqertarsuaq | 252 km^{2} (97 mi^{2}) | Avannaata |
| 30 | Île-de-France | Qeqertaq Prins Henrik | 252 km^{2} (97 mi^{2}) | Northeast Greenland National Park |

=== Islands less than 250 km^{2} (97 mi^{2}) ===
| Rank | Name | Greenlandic name | Area | Municipality |
|---|---|---|---|---|
| | Lindhard Island | Lindhard Ø | 246 km^{2} (95 mi^{2}) | Northeast Greenland National Park |
| | Qeqertarssdaq | Qeqertarssdaq | 241 km^{2} (93 mi^{2}) | Avannaata |
| | Bjornesk Island | Gamma Ø | 234 km^{2} (90 mi^{2}) | Northeast Greenland National Park |
| | Qorsunnitsoq | | 234 km^{2} (90 mi^{2}) | Qeqertalik |
| | Saqqarliup Nunaa | | 233 km^{2} (90 mi^{2}) | Qeqertalik |
| | Timmiarmiit | Timmiarmiit | 229 km^{2} (88 mi^{2}) | Sermersooq |
| | Hazenland | | 226 km^{2} (87 mi^{2}) | Northeast Greenland National Park |
| | Lynn Island | Lynn Ø | 206 km^{2} (80 mi^{2}) | Northeast Greenland National Park |
| | Anoraliuirsoq | Anoraliuirsoq | 200 km^{2} (77 mi^{2}) | Kujalleq |
| | Ikeq Island | Ikeq Ø | 194 km^{2} (75 mi^{2}) | Kujalleq |
| | Storo | Storø | 192 km^{2} (74 mi^{2}) | Sermersooq |
| | Herbert Island | Qeqertarsuaq | 188 km^{2} (73 mi^{2}) | Avannaata |
| | MacMillan Island | MacMillan Ø | 186 km^{2} (72 mi^{2}) | Northeast Greenland National Park |
| | Borup Island | Borup Ø | 183 km^{2} (71 mi^{2}) | Northeast Greenland National Park |
| | Appat Island | Appat Ø | 180 km^{2} (69 mi^{2}) | Avannaata |
| | Sermersuut Island | Hamborgerland | 171 km^{2} (66 mi^{2}) | Qeqqata |
| | Tunertooq | | 169 km^{2} (65 mi^{2}) | Qeqertalik |
| | Qoornuup Qeqertarsua Island | Bjørneøen | 169 km^{2} (65 mi^{2}) | Sermersooq |
| | John Murray Island | John Murray Ø | 143 km^{2} (55 mi^{2}) | Northeast Greenland National Park |
| | Turner Island | Turner Ø | 143 km^{2} (55 mi^{2}) | Sermersooq |
| | Apusiaajik Island | Apusiaajik Ø | 114 km^{2} (44 mi^{2}) | Sermersooq |
| | Qeqertarsuatsiaq Island | Hareøen | 109 km^{2} (42 mi^{2}) | Avannaata |

=== Islands less than 100 km^{2} (39 mi^{2}) ===
| Rank | Name | Greenlandic name | Area | Municipality |
|---|---|---|---|---|
| | Sermitsiaq Island | Sadelø | 84.1 km^{2} (32.5 mi^{2}) | Sermersooq |
| | Danmark Island | Ujuaakajiip Nunaa | 73.3 km^{2} (28.3 mi^{2}) | Sermersooq |
| | Griffenfeld Island | Griffenfeld Ø | 58.5 km^{2} (22.6 mi^{2}) | Sermersooq |
| | Castle Island | Castle Ø | 47.6 km^{2} (18.4 mi^{2}) | Northeast Greenland National Park |
| | Devil Island | Djævleøen | 39.5 km^{2} (15.3 mi^{2}) | Northeast Greenland National Park |
| | Franklin Island | Franklin Ø | 33.7 km^{2} (13.0 mi^{2}) | Avannaata |
| | Beaumont Island | Beaumont Ø | 13.2 km^{2} (5.1 mi^{2}) | Northeast Greenland National Park |
| | Achton Friis Island | Achton Friis Ø | 8.00 km^{2} (3.09 mi^{2}) | Northeast Greenland National Park |
| | Hakluyt Island | Appasuak | 6.55 km^{2} (2.53 mi^{2}) | Avannaata |
| | Uummannaq Island | Uummannap Qeqertaa | 12 km^{2} (4.6 mi^{2}) | Avannaata |
| | Avallersuaq | Avallersuaq | 4.30 km^{2} (1.66 mi^{2}) | Kujalleq |
| | Crozier Island | Crozier Ø | 3.99 km^{2} (1.54 mi^{2}) | Avannaata |
| | Raffles Island | Appalik | 3.46 km^{2} (1.34 mi^{2}) | Sermersooq |
| | Akilia | Akilia | 1.38 km^{2} (0.53 mi^{2}) | Sermersooq |
| | Bjorne Island | Bjorne Ø | 0.28 km^{2} (0.11 mi^{2}) | Northeast Greenland National Park |

== See also ==
- List of islands by area
- List of islands of Greenland
- Lists of islands
