= Skirnir Mountains =

Mountain range in Greenland

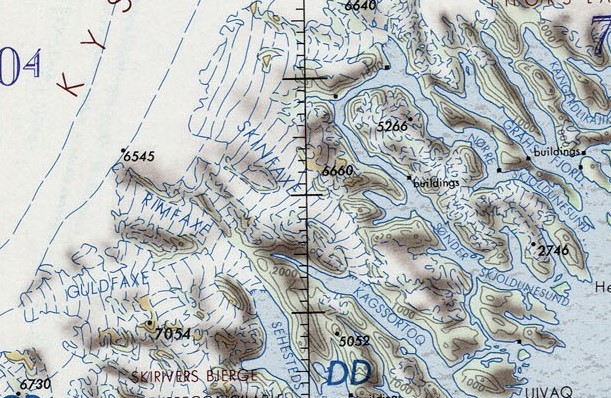
- Kattertooq and Sehested Fjords map section

Highest point
- Elevation: 1,916 m (6,286 ft)
- Listing: List of nunataks
- Coordinates: 63°2′N 42°40′W

Geography
- Location within Greenland
- Location: Sermersooq, Greenland

Skirnir Mountains (Danish: Skirners Bjerge) is a group of nunataks in the King Frederick VI Coast, Sermersooq municipality, SE Greenland. The range is named after Skírnir, the messenger of god Freyr in Norse mythology.

== Geography ==
The Skirnir Mountains are a range of nunataks that rises to the west, between the Heimdal and Garm glaciers, west of the inner area of the Sehested Fjord.

== See also ==
- List of mountain ranges of Greenland
- List of nunataks
