= Sehested Fjord =

Fjord in Greenland

- Umminanak Fjord
- Uummannap Kangertiva (Greenlandic)
- Location in Greenland
- Location: Arctic (SE Greenland)
- Coordinates: 63°3′N 42°0′W
- Ocean/sea sources: North Atlantic Ocean
- Basin countries: Greenland
- Max. length: 50 km (31 mi)
- Max. width: 4.5 km (2.8 mi)

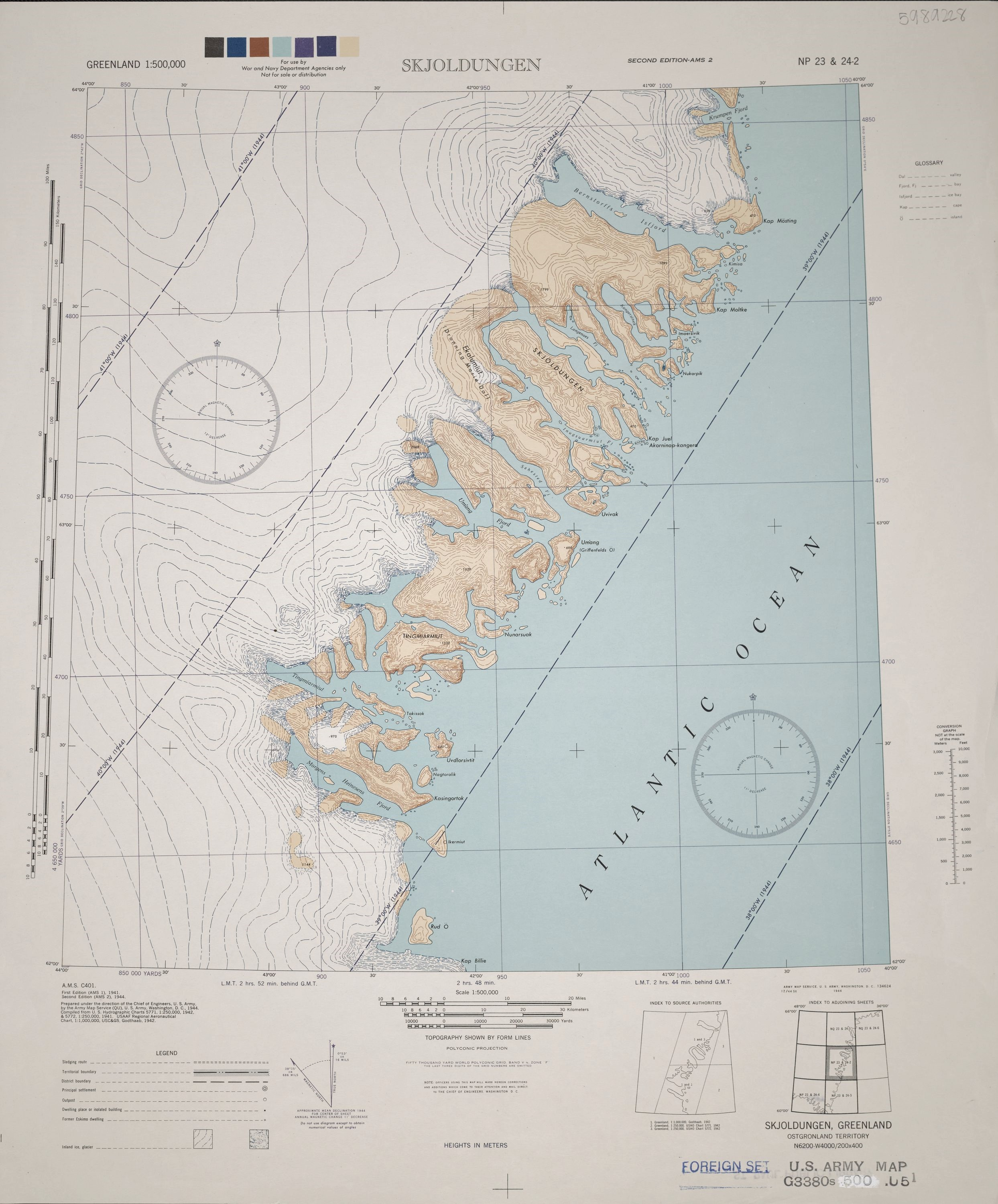
Sehested Fjord (Umang Fjord) in a 1944 map of the area around Skjoldungen.

Sehested Fjord (Greenlandic: Uummannap Kangertiva)) is a fjord of the King Frederick VI Coast in the Sermersooq municipality, southeastern Greenland.

This fjord was named in 1829 by Lieutenant W. A. Graah after Danish Admiral Christen Thomesen Sehested.

== Geography ==
Sehested Fjord is located north of Timmiarmiut Fjord. To the east it opens into the North Atlantic Ocean with Uiivaq and the entrance of Kattertooq Fjord on the northern side of its mouth and Griffenfeld Island on the southern side. Annat Fjord, with Tasiusaq Bay on its western side, is an inlet on the northern shore of the fjord located 17 km from its mouth. Sikuijuitsoq is another small tributary fjord branching from the Sehested Fjord on the southern shore opposite Annat Fjord.

This fjord has large, active glaciers at its head. The Rimfaxe, Guldfaxe and Ygdrasil glaciers have their confluence shortly before their terminus at the northwestern end of the fjord. Flowing from the west, the Garm glacier has two branches near its terminus, one flowing southwards into the Ernineq Fjord of the Timmiarmiut fjord system and the other eastwards into the Sikuijuitsoq, the southern branch of the Sehested Fjord.

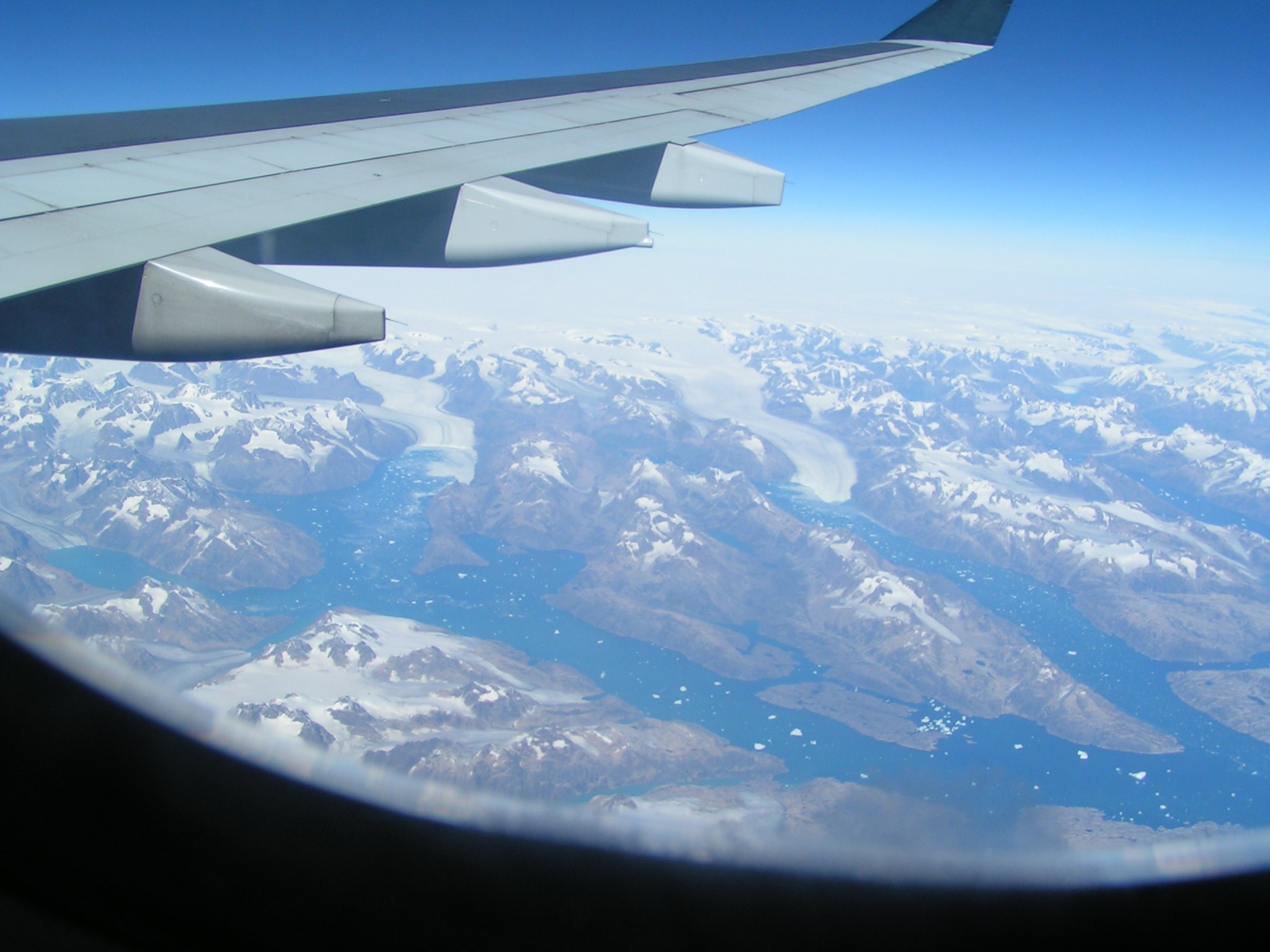
Sehested Fjord (right)

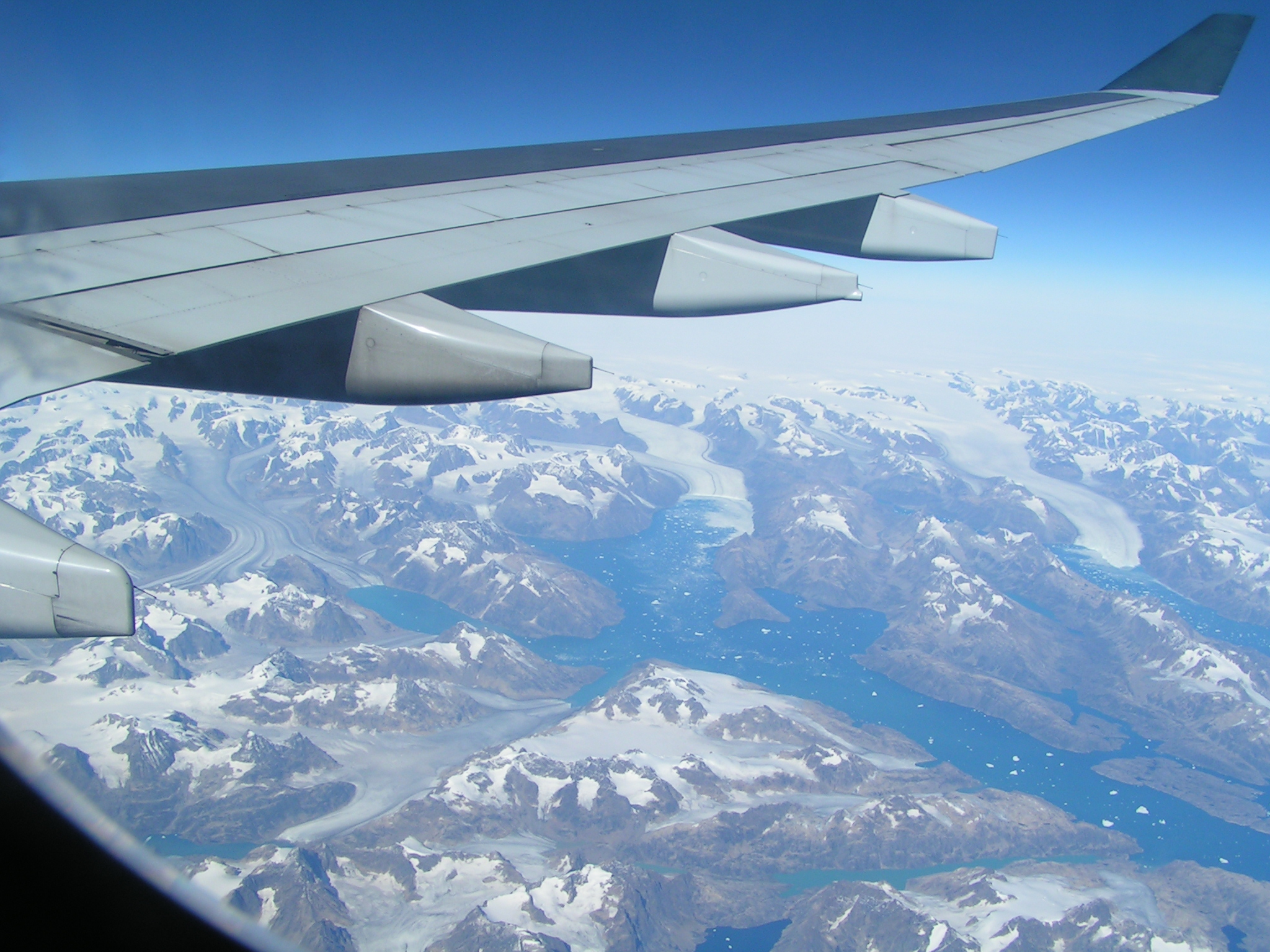
Sehested Fjord (right)

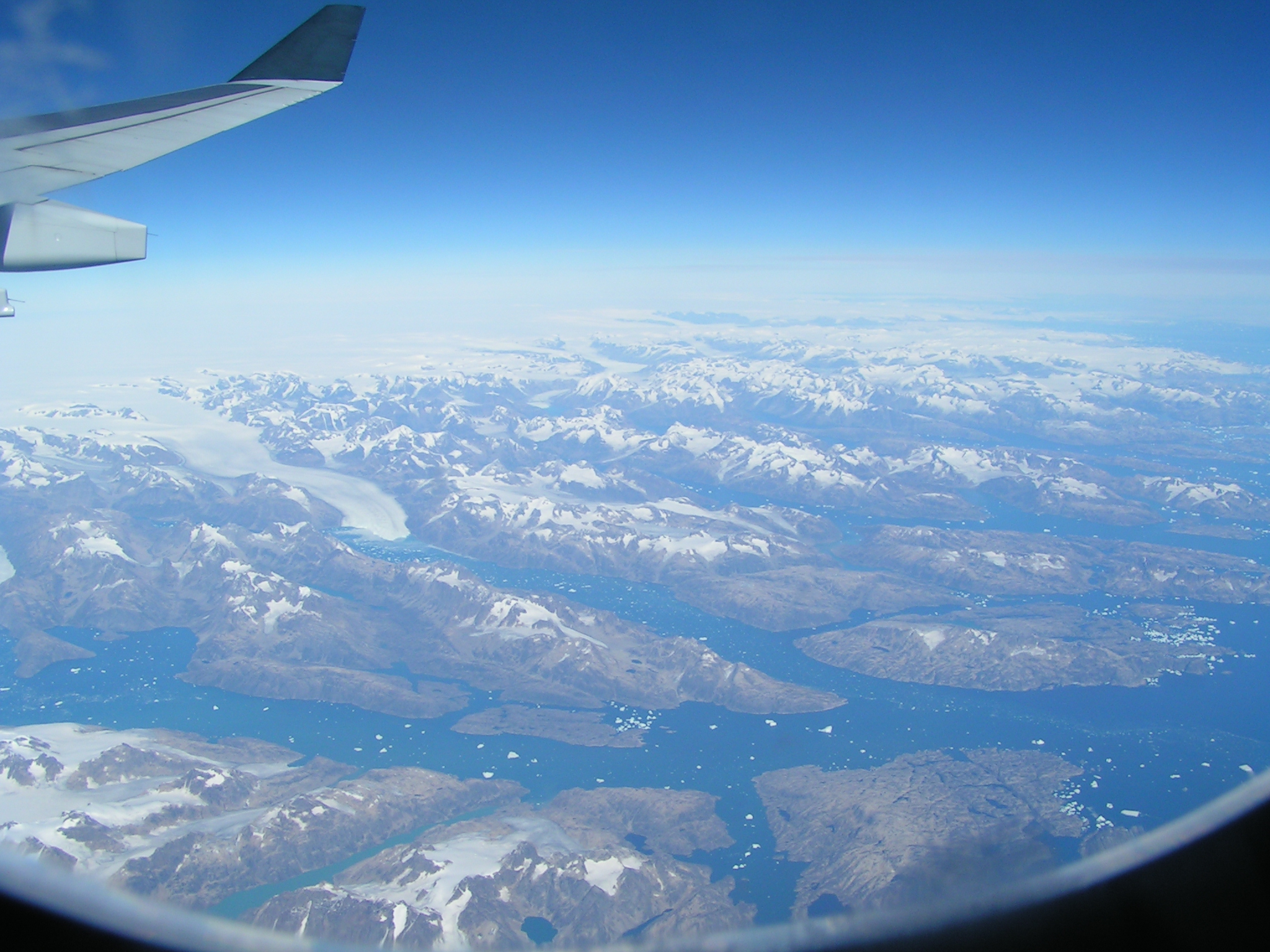
Sehested Fjord (middle) and Uiivaq

=== Mountains ===
There are high mountains on both sides of the fjord. 1,539 m (5,049 ft) high Peberbøssen, a prominent peak, rises on the King Dan Peninsula (Kong Dan Halvø) on the northern side near the entrance. Further inland a 2,004 m (6,575 ft) high summit rises in the north at 63°18′25″N 42°12′37″W. In the western side, a 1,832 m (6,010 ft) high summit rises at 63°7′58″N 42°14′57″W. The Skirnir Mountains (Skirners Bjerge) are a nunatak group rising at 63°2′N 42°40′W between the Heimdal and Garm glaciers in the inner part of the fjord.

== See also ==
- List of fjords of Greenland
