= Niviarsiat =

Niviarsiat may refer to:

- Niviarsiat (Kujalleq), a mountain in southern Greenland
- Niviarsiat (Northeast Greenland National Park), a mountain in northeast Greenland
