= Anoraliuirsoq =

Island in Greenland

- Location of Anoraliuirsoqin Greenland
- Interactive map of Anoraliuirsoq

Geography
- Location: Labrador Sea; Southern Greenland
- Coordinates: 60.03°N 44.36°W
- Archipelago: Nunap Isua Archipelago
- Adjacent to: North Atlantic Ocean
- Area: 200 km^{2} (77 sq mi)
- Area rank: 34th largest in Greenland
- Coastline: 115.5 km (71.77 mi)

Administration
- Greenland
- Municipality: Kujalleq

Demographics
- Population: 0 (2023)
- Pop. density: 0/km^{2} (0/sq mi)
- Ethnic groups: none

Anoraliuirsoq is an uninhabited island of Greenland. The island has an area of 200 km ² and has a shoreline of 115.5 kilometres.

== See also ==
- List of islands of Greenland
