= Prince Christian Sound =

Waterway in Greenland

- Ikerasassuaq (Greenlandic)
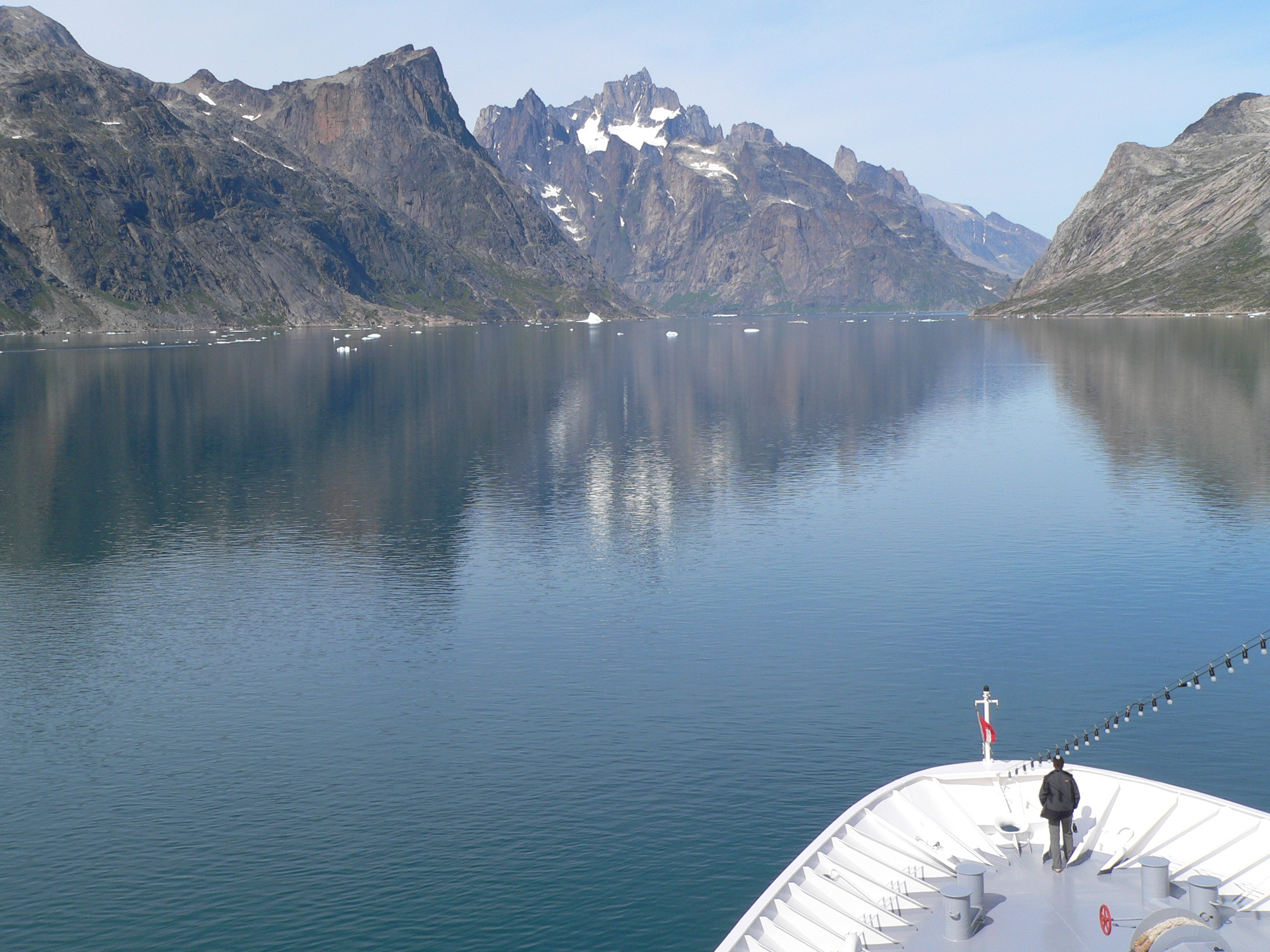

- Location in Greenland
- Location: Arctic (S Greenland)
- Coordinates: 60°9′N 43°53′W
- Ocean/sea sources: Labrador Sea / Irminger Sea (North Atlantic Ocean)
- Basin countries: Greenland
- Max. length: 100 km (62 mi)
- Max. width: 2.7 km (1.7 mi)

The Prince Christian Sound (Kalaallisut: Ikerasassuaq; Danish: Prins Christians Sund) is a waterway in Southern Greenland. It separates the mainland from Sammisoq (Christian IV Island) and other islands of the Cape Farewell Archipelago near the southernmost tip of Greenland. The name was given in honour of the prince, later king Christian VIII of Denmark.

== Geography ==
Prince Christian Sound

The Prince Christian Sound connects the Labrador Sea with the Irminger Sea. It is around 100 km (60 miles) long and it is narrow, sometimes only 500 metres (1,600 ft) wide. The only settlement along this sound is Aappilattoq.

The long fjord system is mostly surrounded by steep mountains in general reaching over 1,200 metres (3,900 ft), one of them 2,220 metres (7,280 ft) high. Many glaciers go straight into its waters where they calve icebergs. There are often strong tidal currents limiting the formation of ice. It has many offshoots, such as Kangerluk to the north midway through the fjord, Ikeq Fjord in the south, and in the west Ilua Fjord, Ikerasaq Fjord (Akuliarutsip Imaa), Utoqqarmiut Fjord (Pamialluup Kujatinngua) and the Torsukattak Fjord.

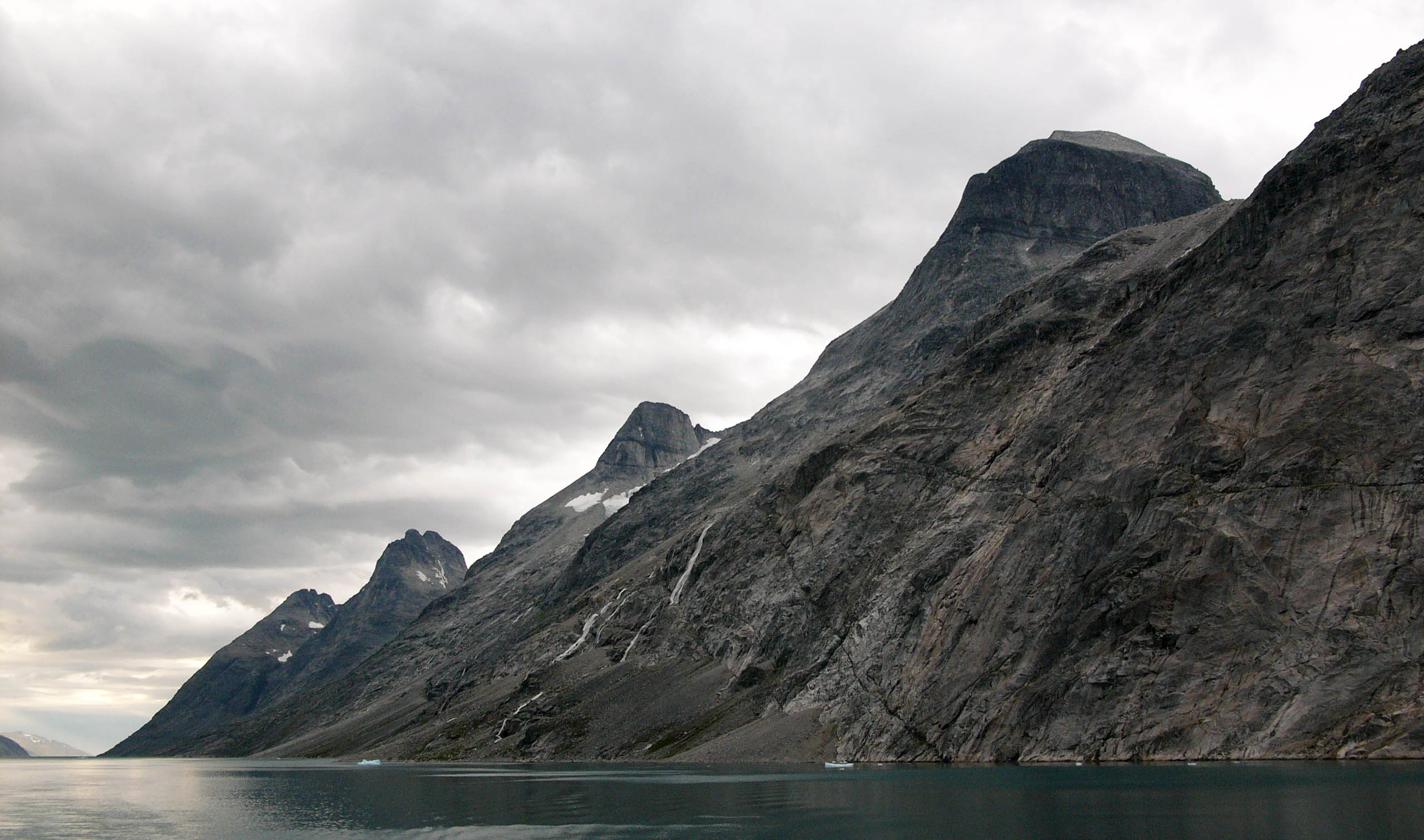
View of the shore.

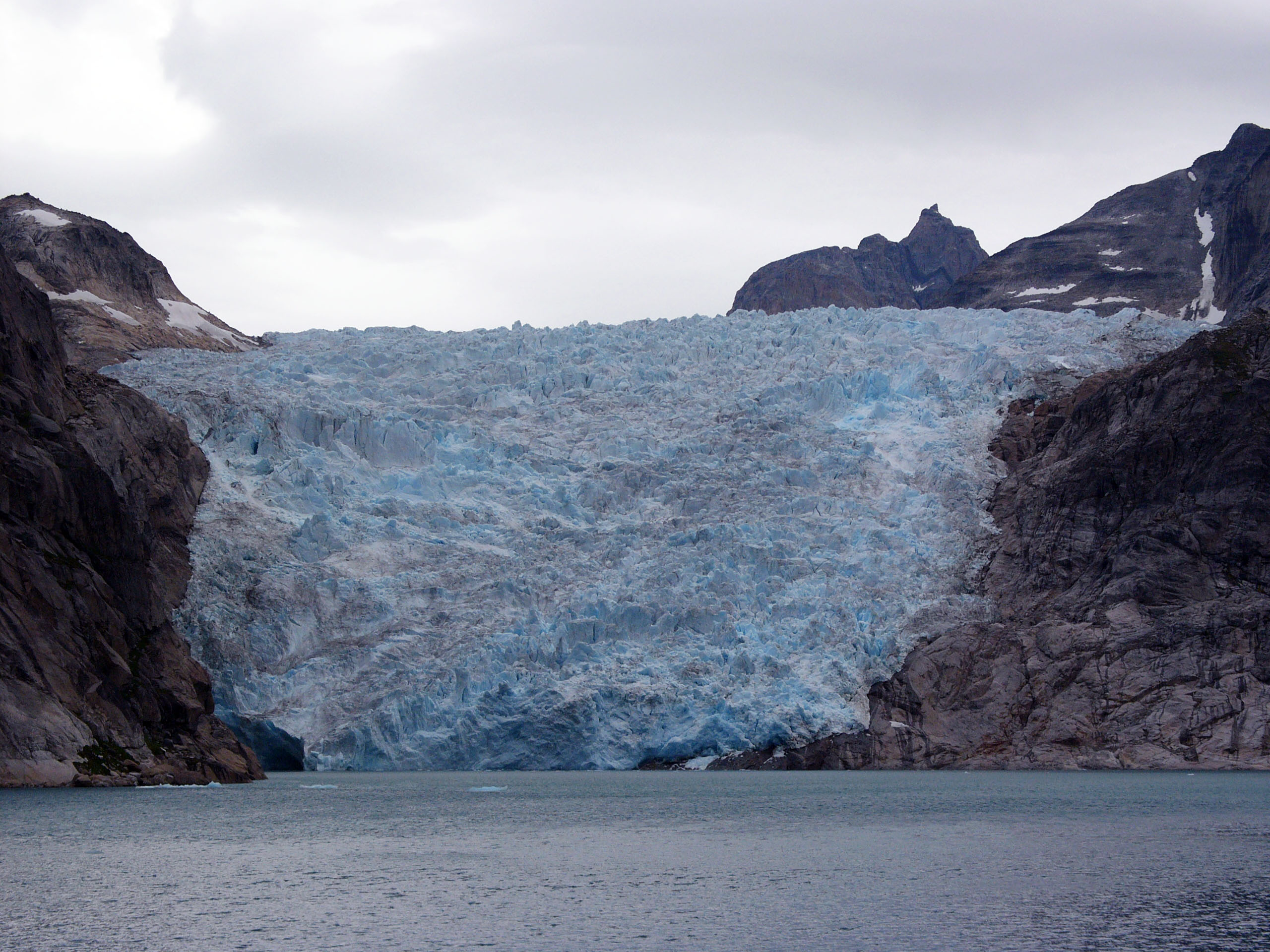
Head of a glacier

== Weather station ==
At the entrance to the East of the Strait (60°03′N 43°10′W) is a weather station founded by the US during World War II named Bluie East One. The task of the weather station was to ensure that the shipping industry had reliable data on the weather at Cape Farewell, Greenland. On 7 January 1959, when the ship MS Hans Hedtoft hit an iceberg at Cape Farvel, the radio telegraphist at the weather station at Prince Christian Sound was the first to catch the ship's distress signal.

The weather station is today run by the International Civil Aviation Organization ICAO together with Tele Greenland. A long wooden stairway leads from the harbour up to the station with community building, power plant, residential barracks and radio aerial plants.

== Tourism ==
The scenery of Prince Christian Sound attracts summer cruise ships to the area, with some vessels as large as the 86,700 ton Eurodam, or the 137,000 ton Voyager of the Seas. Ships must go slowly due to the icebergs.

== Climate ==
Prince Christian Sound has a maritime polar climate (Köppen ET) making borderline with subpolar oceanic climate (Cfc) due low annual temperature swings for its latitude and relatively high temperature in center months. Summer temperatures are way below the tree line requirements, whereas the long winters are comparatively mild for its high latitude. The nearby ice sheet produces cold air which keeps summer temperatures down.

Climate data for Prince Christian Sound 1961-1990, extremes 1958-1999
Month	Jan	Feb	Mar	Apr	May	Jun	Jul	Aug	Sep	Oct	Nov	Dec	Year
Record high °C (°F)	7.5 (45.5)	9.0 (48.2)	9.0 (48.2)	11.6 (52.9)	14.0 (57.2)	20.0 (68.0)	24.2 (75.6)	20.9 (69.6)	20.0 (68.0)	14.2 (57.6)	9.8 (49.6)	13.4 (56.1)	24.2 (75.6)
Mean daily maximum °C (°F)	−1.9 (28.6)	−1.8 (28.8)	−1.3 (29.7)	1.5 (34.7)	4.4 (39.9)	7.3 (45.1)	9.8 (49.6)	9.6 (49.3)	6.9 (44.4)	3.5 (38.3)	0.6 (33.1)	−0.9 (30.4)	3.1 (37.7)
Daily mean °C (°F)	−4.1 (24.6)	−3.9 (25.0)	−3.7 (25.3)	−0.9 (30.4)	1.9 (35.4)	4.5 (40.1)	6.5 (43.7)	6.5 (43.7)	4.3 (39.7)	1.4 (34.5)	−1.3 (29.7)	−3.2 (26.2)	0.7 (33.2)
Mean daily minimum °C (°F)	−6.2 (20.8)	−6.3 (20.7)	−5.9 (21.4)	−3.5 (25.7)	−0.6 (30.9)	1.2 (34.2)	3.3 (37.9)	3.3 (37.9)	1.9 (35.4)	−0.7 (30.7)	−3.4 (25.9)	−5.1 (22.8)	−1.8 (28.7)
Record low °C (°F)	−20.0 (−4.0)	−16.0 (3.2)	−16.9 (1.6)	−15.2 (4.6)	−10.2 (13.6)	−5.5 (22.1)	−3.6 (25.5)	−3.5 (25.7)	−3.2 (26.2)	−6.9 (19.6)	−12.0 (10.4)	−15.3 (4.5)	−20.0 (−4.0)
Average precipitation mm (inches)	262 (10.3)	246 (9.7)	205 (8.1)	227 (8.9)	175 (6.9)	136 (5.4)	129 (5.1)	173 (6.8)	233 (9.2)	219 (8.6)	227 (8.9)	251 (9.9)	2,483 (97.8)
Average precipitation days (≥ 1 mm)	15.9	15.6	14.1	14.2	12.5	10.0	10.5	10.4	12.7	12.7	13.0	15.1	156.7
Average snowy days	16.6	15.8	15.0	13.6	7.8	1.8	0.2	0.1	3.0	9.1	13.5	14.6	111.1
Source: DMI

== See also ==
- List of fjords of Greenland
