= Ikeq Island =

Uninhabited island in Greenland

Native name: Ikeq Ø
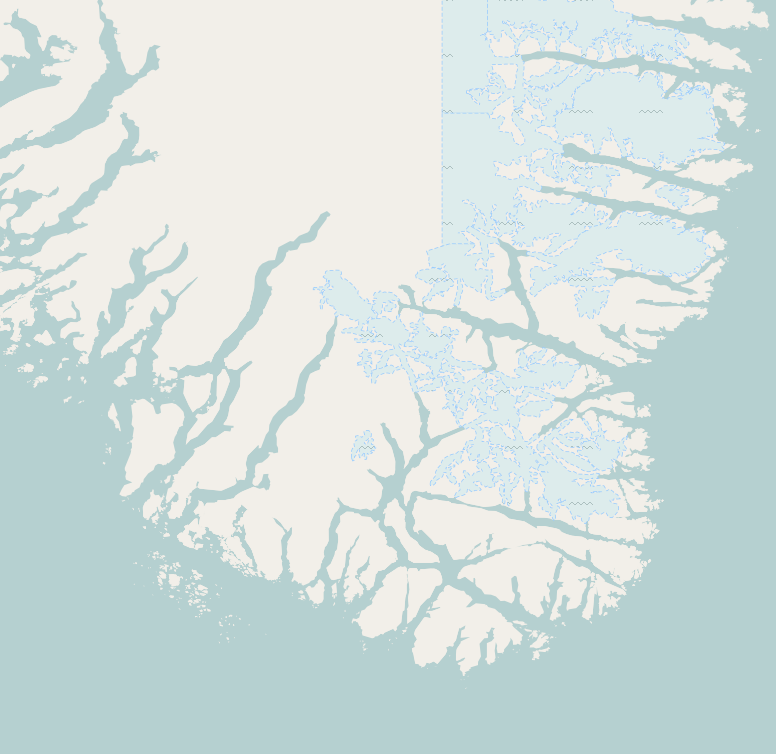
- Location of Ikeq Island in Greenland Ikeq Island (Greenland)
- Interactive map of Ikeq Island

Geography
- Location: Labrador Sea; Southern Greenland
- Coordinates: 59.94°N 44.20°W
- Archipelago: Nunap Isua Archipelago
- Adjacent to: North Atlantic Ocean
- Area: 198.9 km^{2} (76.8 sq mi)
- Area rank: 34th largest in Greenland
- Length: 60 km (37 mi)
- Coastline: 89.4 km (55.55 mi)
- Highest elevation: 1,388 m (4554 ft)
- Highest point: Toornaarsuk

Administration
- Greenland
- Municipality: Kujalleq

Demographics
- Population: 0 (2023)
- Pop. density: 0/km^{2} (0/sq mi)
- Ethnic groups: none

Ikeq is an island of the Kujalleq municipality, southern Greenland.

== Geography ==
The island has an area of 194 km ² and a shoreline of 89.4 kilometres. Its coast is deeply indented and its eastern part (Qunnerit) is almost separated from the main island by a narrow inlet stretching from north to south.

Along with Itilleq, Sammisoq, Nunarsuaq (Nunarssuak), Pamialluk, Annikitsoq, Walkendorff and Qernertoq (Kasit), it is part of the Cape Farewell Archipelago (Nunap Isua).

== See also ==
- List of islands of Greenland

== Bibliography ==
- Prostar (1 January 2005). Prostar Sailing Directions 2005 Greenland and Iceland Enroute. ProStar Publications. ISBN 978-1-57785-753-2.
- United States. Hydrographic Office (1947). Publications.
