= Tjasse Glacier =

Glacier in South-eastern Greenland

- Tjasses Gletscher
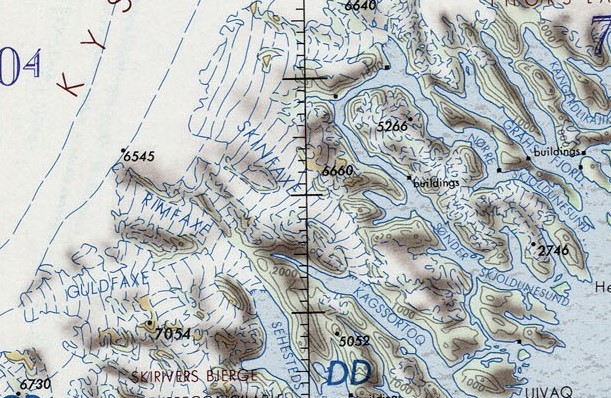
- Kattertooq and Sehested Fjords map section

- Location within Greenland
- Location: Greenland
- Coordinates: 63°20′N 42°13′W
- Terminus: Skinfaxe Glacier; Kattertooq, North Atlantic Ocean

Tjasse (Danish: Tjasses Gletscher) is a glacier of the King Frederick VI Coast area in the Sermersooq municipality, southeastern Greenland.

This glacier is named after Þjazi, the powerful storm giant of Norse mythology.

== Geography ==
Tjasse is a broad glacier that flows roughly southeastward east of the smaller Ygdrasil glacier. Shortly after bending in an eastward direction it joins the right side of the Skinfaxe Glacier before its terminus in the Kattertooq fjord.

== See also ==
- List of glaciers in Greenland
- Rimfaxe (glacier)
