= Guldfaxe (glacier) =

Glacier in Greenland

- Guldfaxe Gletscher
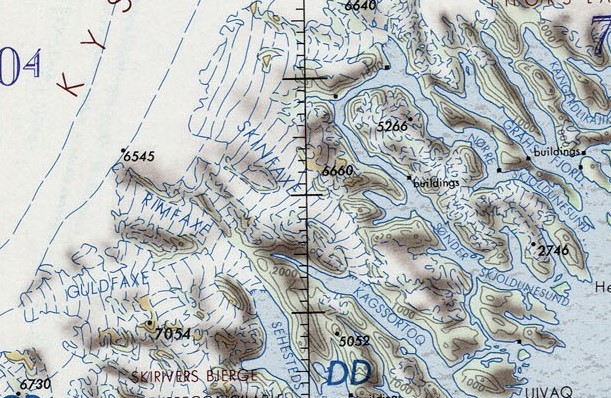
- Kattertooq and Sehested Fjords map section

- Location within Greenland
- Location: Greenland
- Coordinates: 63°13′N 42°30′W
- Terminus: Rimfaxe Glacier; Sehested Fjord, North Atlantic Ocean

Guldfaxe (Danish: Guldfaxe Gletscher) is a glacier of the King Frederick VI Coast area in the Sermersooq municipality, southeastern Greenland.

This glacier is named after Gullfaxi, the golden-maned horse of Norse mythology.

== Geography ==
Guldfaxe is a large, active glacier flowing from the eastern side of the Greenland ice sheet.

The Guldfaxe glacier flows roughly eastward between sharp nunataks and flows into the right side of the Rimfaxe Glacier shortly before its terminus in the Sehested Fjord.

== See also ==
- List of glaciers in Greenland
- Skinfaxe (glacier)
