= Sikuijivitteq =

Fjord in Greenland

- Mogens Heinesen Fjord; Kangerdlugsuatsiak
- Location in Greenland
- Interactive map of Sikuijivitteq
- Location: Kujalleq, Greenland
- Coordinates: 62°24′N 42°37′W
- Type: Fjord
- Part of: King Frederick VI Coast
- Ocean/sea sources: North Atlantic Ocean
- Max. length: 45 km (28 mi)
- Max. width: 4.7 km (2.9 mi)
- Islands: Ikermiit

Sikuijivitteq (Danish: Mogens Heinesen Fjord), also known as Kangerdlugsuatsiak, is a fjord of the King Frederick VI Coast in the Kujalleq municipality, southeastern Greenland. The name 'Mogens Heinesen' is based on Magnus Heinason, a 16th-century Faroese naval hero.

== Geography ==
Sikuijivitteq is located south of Timmiarmiut Fjord (Timmiarmiit Kangertivat); to the east it opens into the North Atlantic Ocean. Ikermiit Island is located off the fjord's mouth.

=== Mountains ===
There are high mountains rising on both sides of the fjord, becoming especially craggy towards the inner side. One of the most impressive is a dark pyramidal peak in the nunatak at the head of the fjord rising steeply to a height of 1,884 m (6,181 ft) on the southern side above the glacier at 62°30′57″N 43°20′44″W.

6 km to the east in the same nunatak there is a steep mountain with multiple peaks rising to a height of 1,894 m (6,214 ft) at 62°31′20″N 43°13′5″W and at the eastern end there is a massive summit rising to a height of 1,945 m (6,381 ft) above the confluence of the glaciers at 62°31′18″N 43°7′2″W, but the highest is a 2,069 m (6,788 ft) glacier-topped mountain located to the west at 62°32′37″N 43°23′33″W.

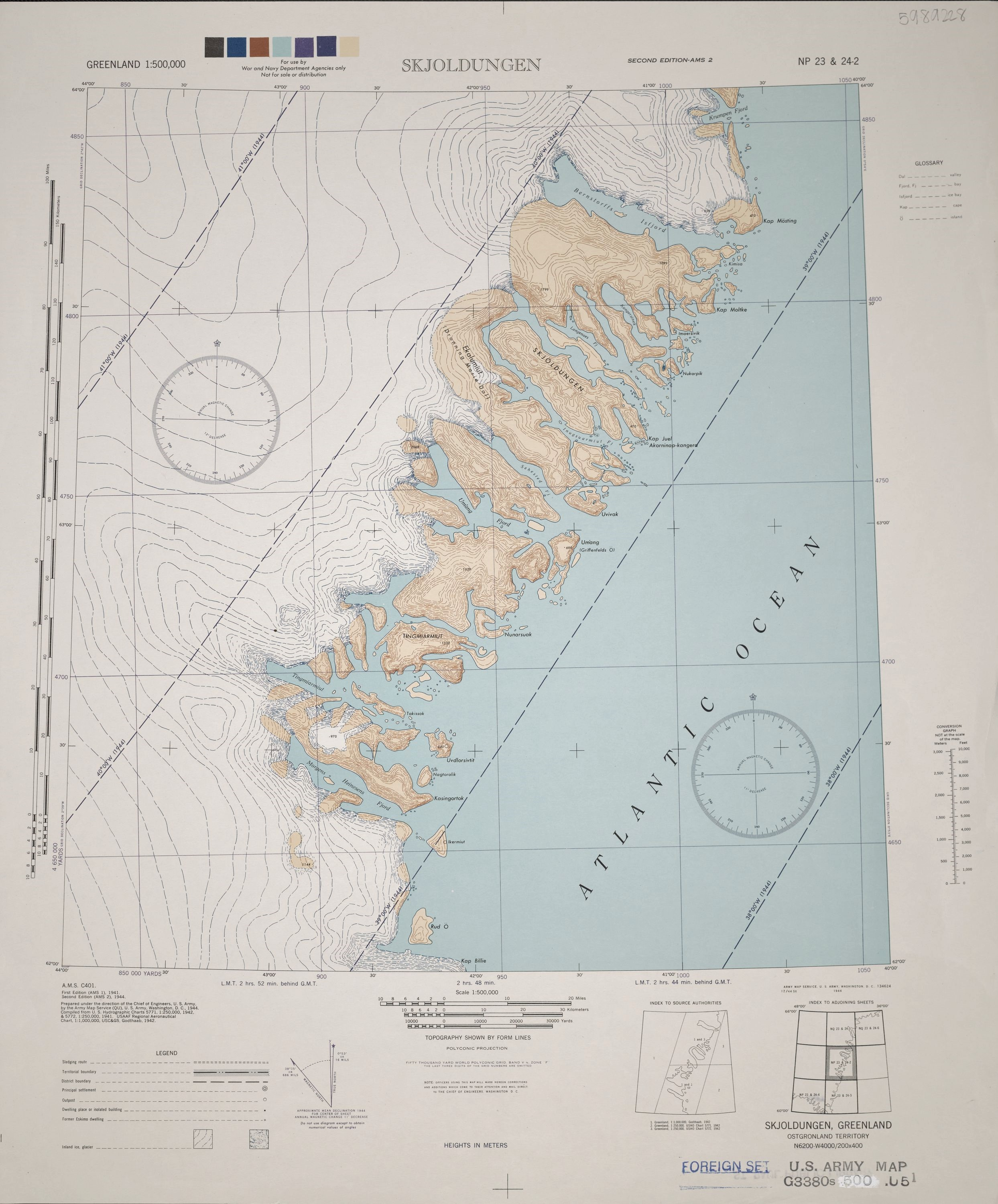
"Morgens" Heinesen Fjord in a 1944 map of the area around Skjoldungen.

== See also ==
- List of fjords of Greenland
