= Kattertooq =

Fjord in Greenland

- Kagssortôq, Kagtertōq
- Location in Greenland
- Location: Arctic (SE Greenland)
- Coordinates: 63°9′N 41°46′W
- Ocean/sea sources: North Atlantic Ocean
- Basin countries: Greenland
- Max. length: 45 km (28 mi)
- Max. width: 3 km (1.9 mi)

Kattertooq, meaning 'where there is much blue ice' in the Greenlandic language,) is a fjord of the King Frederick VI Coast in the Sermersooq municipality, southeastern Greenland.

== Geography ==
Kattertooq is located north of the King Dan Peninsula. It is oriented in a NW/SE direction and has a tributary fjord branching eastwards 25 km from its mouth. To the east it opens into the North Atlantic Ocean with Uiivaq island on the northern and the entrance of Sehested Fjord (Uummannap Kangertiva) and Griffenfeld Island on the southern side of its mouth.

This fjord has a large, active glacier at its head, the Skinfaxe Glacier, which has its terminus in the fjord shortly after its confluence with the Tjasse Glacier joining it from the west.

== History ==
Uivaq is a Paleo-Eskimo archaeological site near the entrance to a sound on Kattertooq's northern coast.

Map of Kattertooq

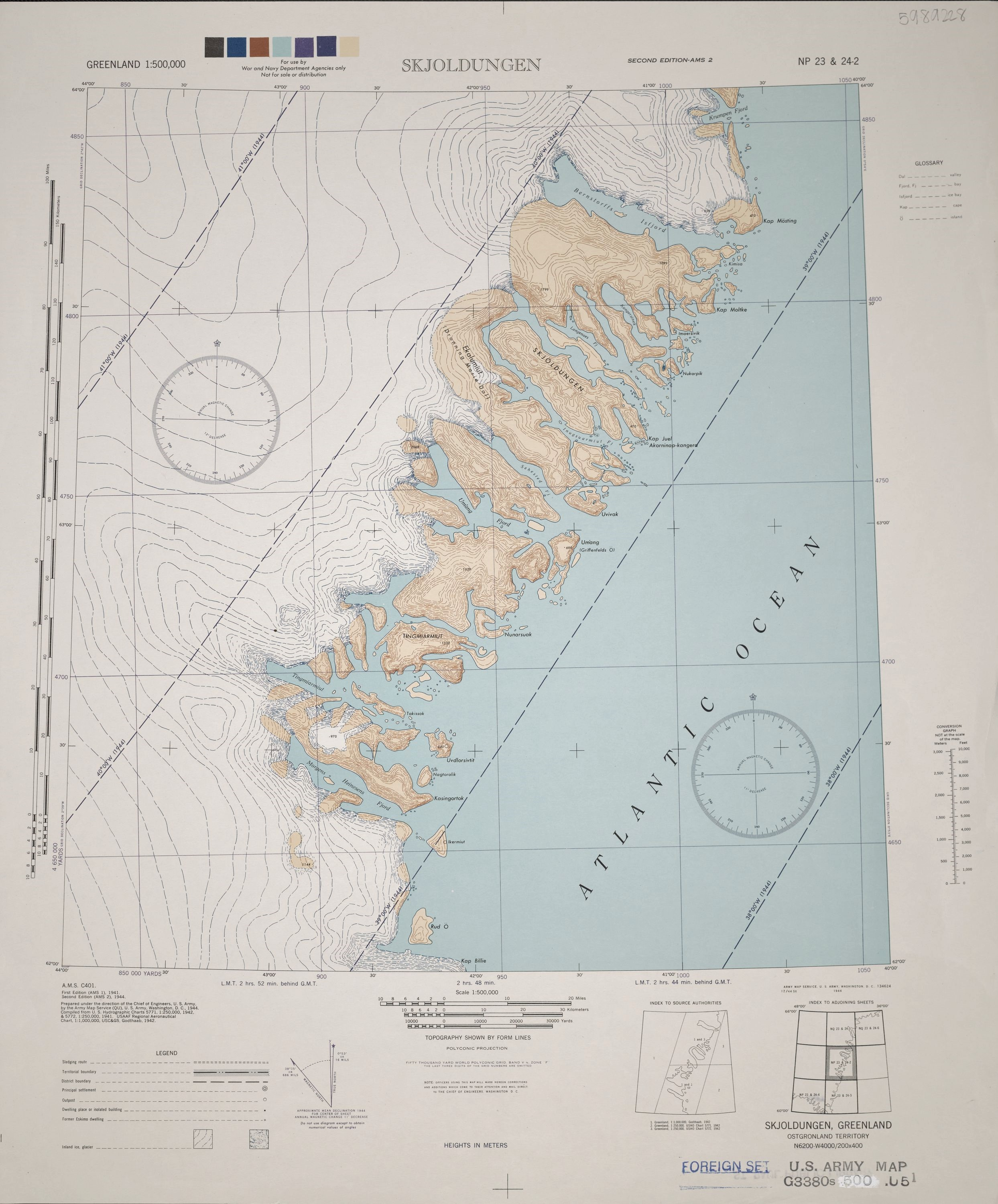
Kattertooq wrongly labeled as 'Sehested Fjord' in a 1944 map of the area around Skjoldungen.

== See also ==
- List of fjords of Greenland
