= Griffenfeld Island =

Island in Greenland

Native name: Umanaq
- Location of Griffenfeld Island in Greenland
- Interactive map of Griffenfeld Island

Geography
- Location: North Atlantic Ocean
- Coordinates: 62°56′N 41°33′W
- Area: 58.9 km^{2} (22.7 sq mi)
- Highest elevation: 701 m (2300 ft)
- Highest point: Umanaq

Administration
- Greenland
- Municipality: Sermersooq

Demographics
- Population: 0 (2021)
- Pop. density: 0/km^{2} (0/sq mi)

Griffenfeld Island, Griffenfeldt Island, (Danish: Griffenfeld Ø) or Umanaq ("the mountain in the shape of a heart"), after the name of the highest peak. is an uninhabited island in the Sermersooq municipality in southern Greenland.

== History ==
The island was named after Danish Statesman Count Peder Griffenfeld (1635–1699) by Wilhelm August Graah during his 1829 expedition to the east coast of Greenland. Graah thought that he could see the distant Niviarsiat peaks, on the western side of the Greenland ice sheet, from the highest point of Griffenfeldt Island

They were probably, the tops of Niviarsiet, or The Maidens, in the district of Juliana's Hope.

Fridtjof Nansen discovered old Eskimo ruins at the foot of Umanaq mountain in 1882.

Knud Rasmussen visited the island in 1932, in the course of his Sixth Thule Expedition and described Griffenfeld Island as "barren and exposed to the fogs and winter ice of the sea".

== Geography ==
Griffenfeld Island is a coastal island located off King Frederick VI Coast in southeastern Greenland, separated from the mainland by a narrow sound. It lies south of the mouth of Sehested Fjord and Kattertooq, and north of the mouth of Timmiarmiut Fjord. Its length is 14 kilometres (9 miles) and its maximum width 5.5 kilometres (3 miles).

The island's coast is deeply indented and off its shore lie several small islets.

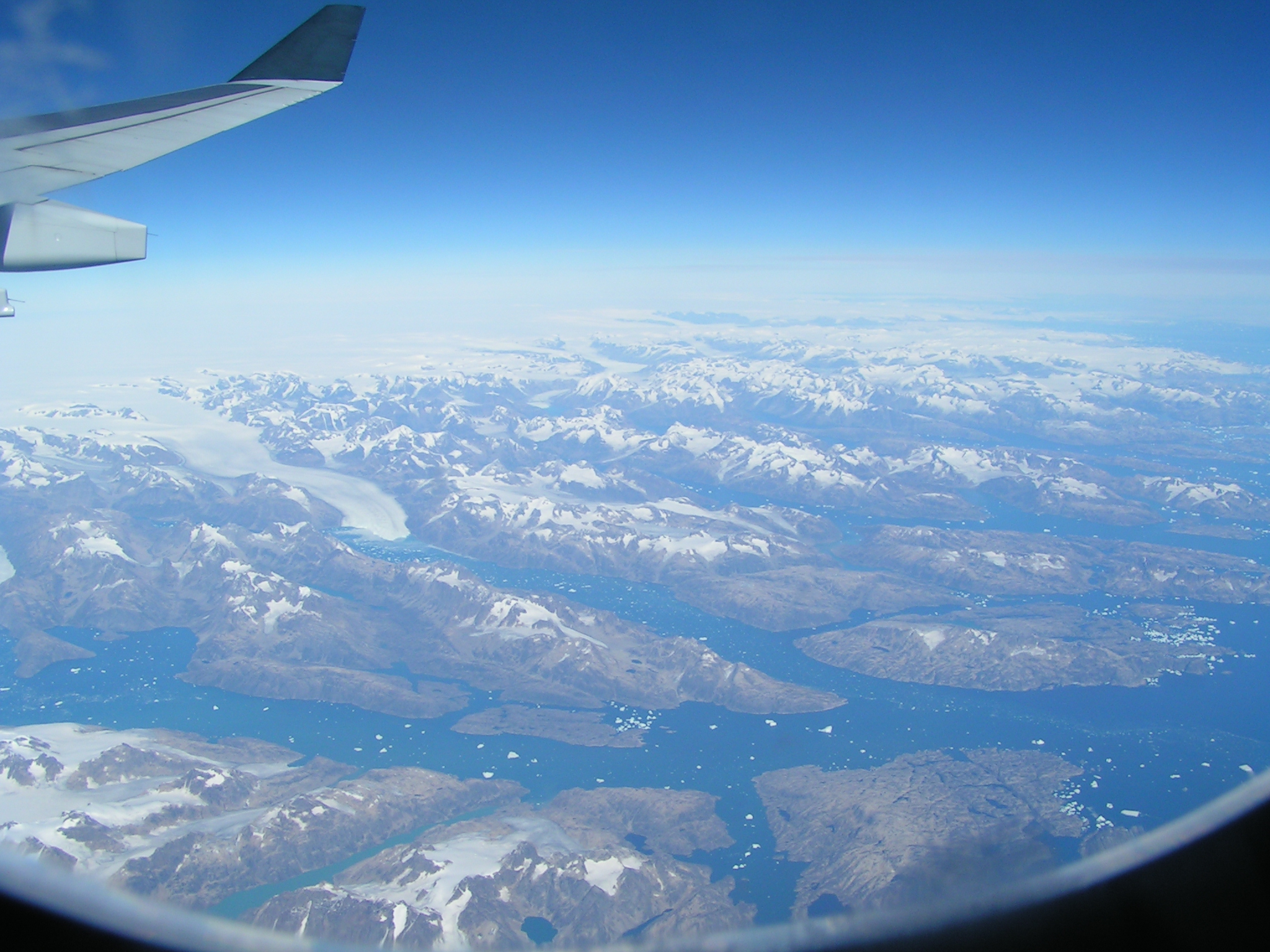
Picture of the Sehested Fjord mouth area with Griffenfeld Island in the lower right corner.

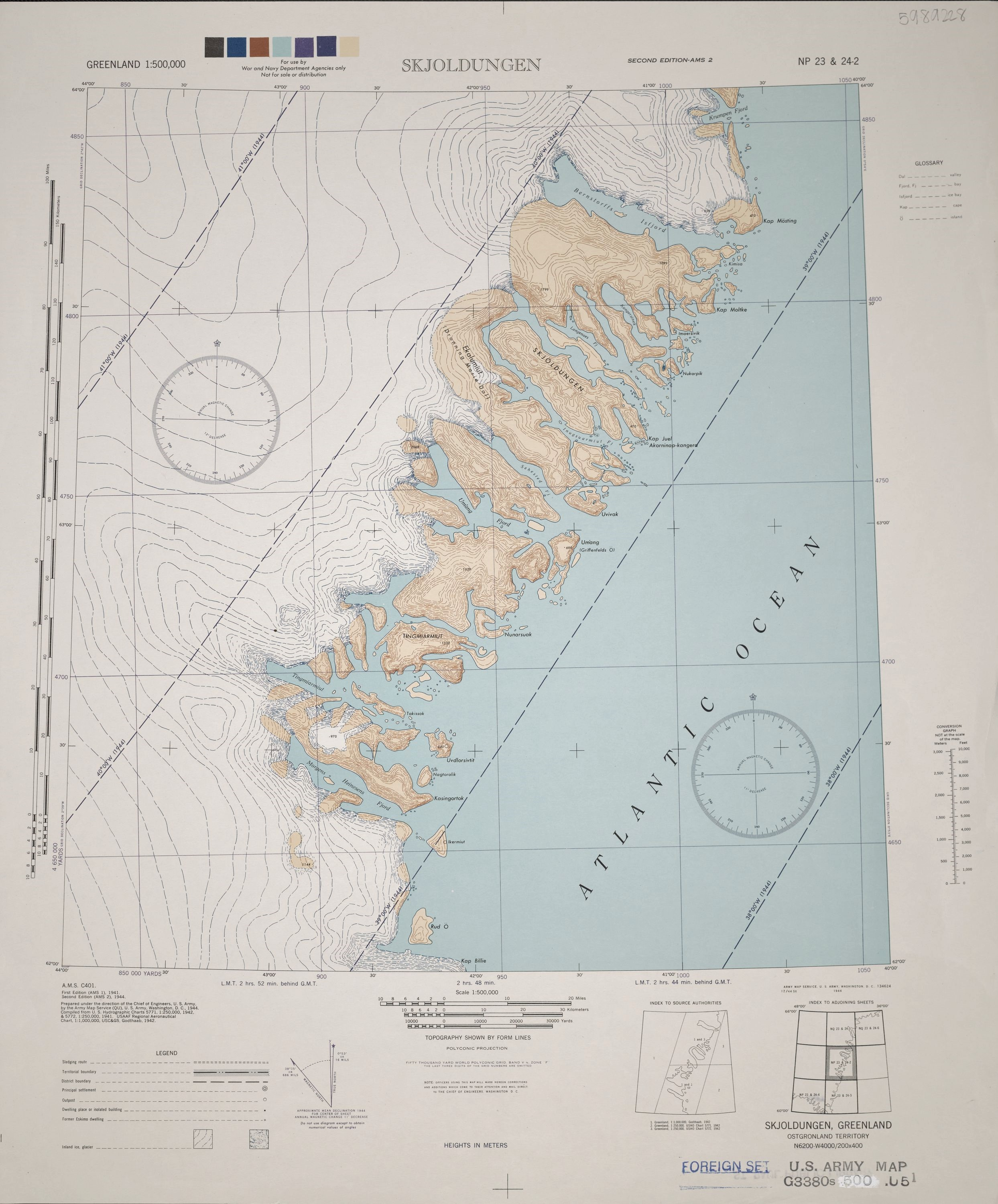
1944 map of the area around Skjoldungen with Griffenfeld Island as "Umang".

== See also ==
- List of islands of Greenland
