= Timmiarmiit =

Island in southern Greenland

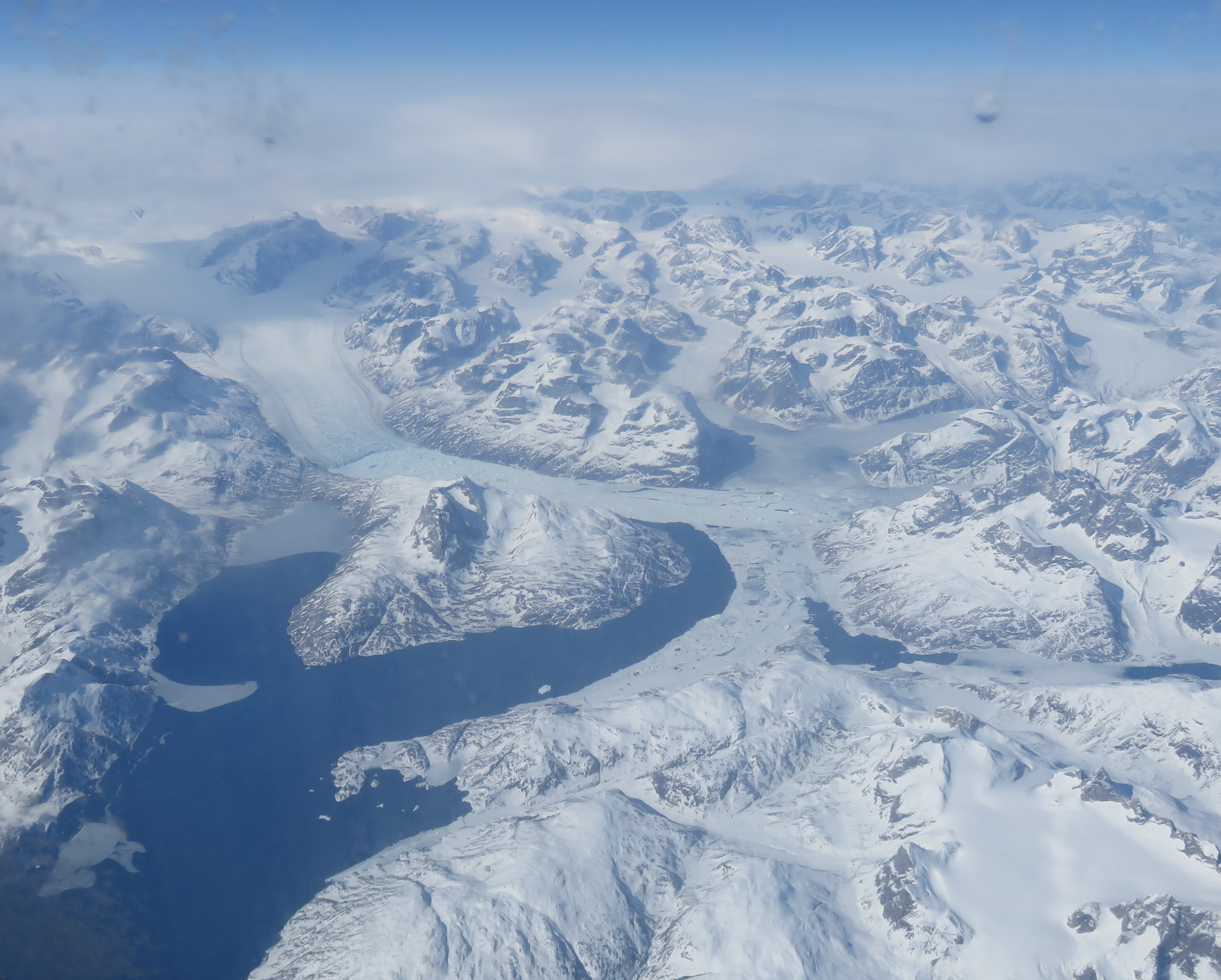
- The northern part of Timmiarmiit in the foreground, with Heimdal Glacier behind it
- Interactive map of Timmiarmiit

Geography
- Location: North Atlantic Ocean; Southern Greenland
- Coordinates: 62°45′N 42°10′W
- Area: 229.3 km^{2} (88.5 sq mi)
- Length: 30 km (19 mi)
- Width: 16 km (9.9 mi)
- Coastline: 140.6 km (87.36 mi)
- Highest elevation: 1,300 m (4300 ft)
- Highest point: Takkerne

Administration
- Greenland
- Municipality: Sermersooq

Demographics
- Population: 0

Timmiarmiit (old spelling 'Tingmiarmit') is an uninhabited island of the King Frederick VI Coast, Sermersooq municipality, southern Greenland.

== Geography ==
The island is located at the entrance of the Timmiarmiut Fjord in a very indented area of King Frederick VI Coast in southeastern Greenland. Timmiarmiit's coastline is very irregular with a deep fjord on its eastern side that almost divides the island in two. It has an area of 229.3 km ² and a shoreline of 140.6 kilometres. It is separated from the mainland in the north by the Timmiarmiit Tunorqútariât, a narrow sound. Off its southern shoreline lie the islands of Aaluik and Ingmikârtajivit, as well as a multitude of islets and rocks.

The Qivítip Igtiva and Inukasingmit Paleo-Eskimo archaeological sites are located on the SW of the island —the latter on an islet off the shore— and the Sarpap Tupertivâ site on the NW headland. All former Inuit settlements on Timmiarmiit are on shoreline locations.

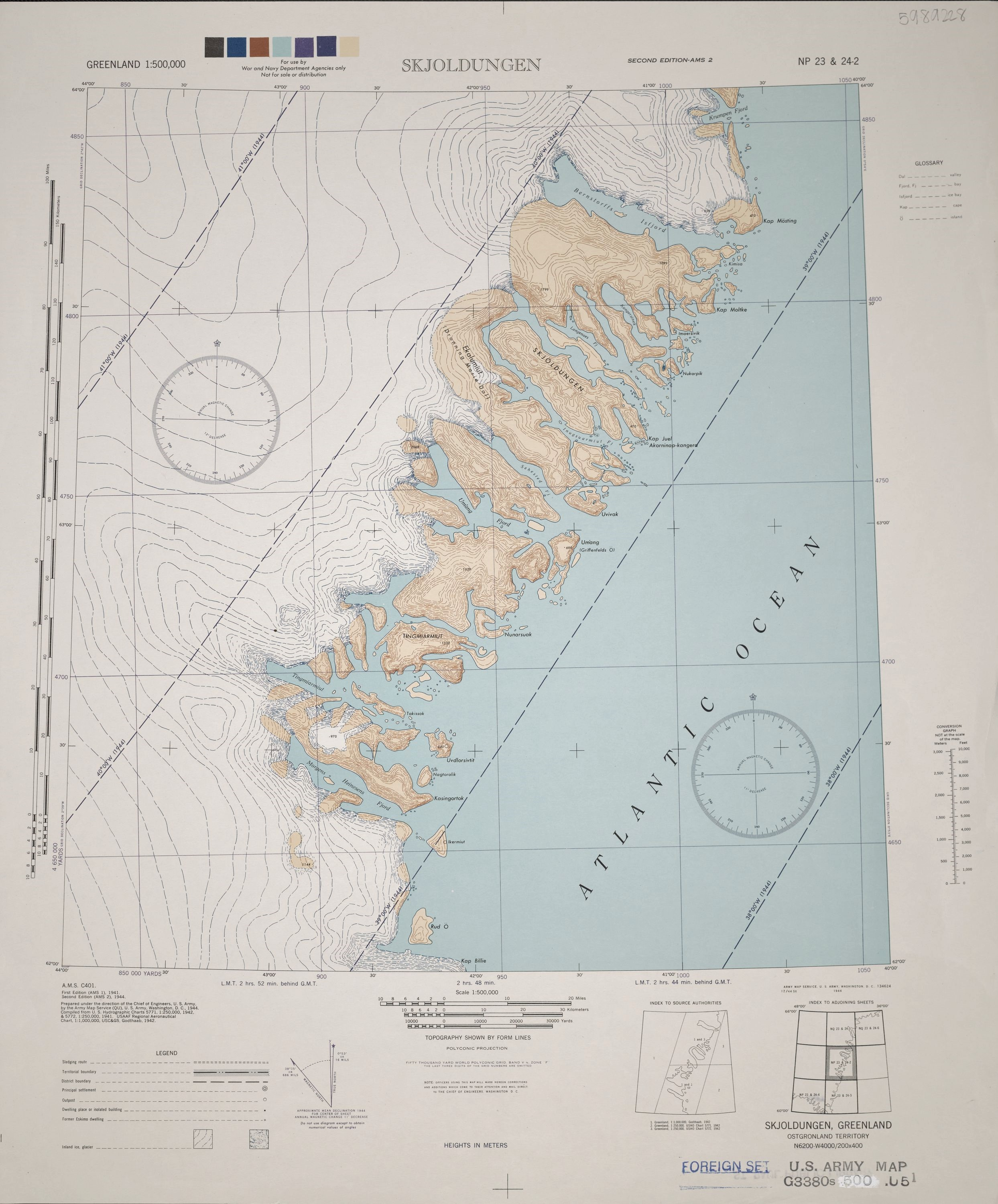
'Tingmiarmiut' Island in a 1944 map of the area around Skjoldungen.

== See also ==
- List of islands of Greenland
