= Egger Island =

Island in Greenland

Native name: Eggers Ø (Danish) Itilleq (Greenlandic)
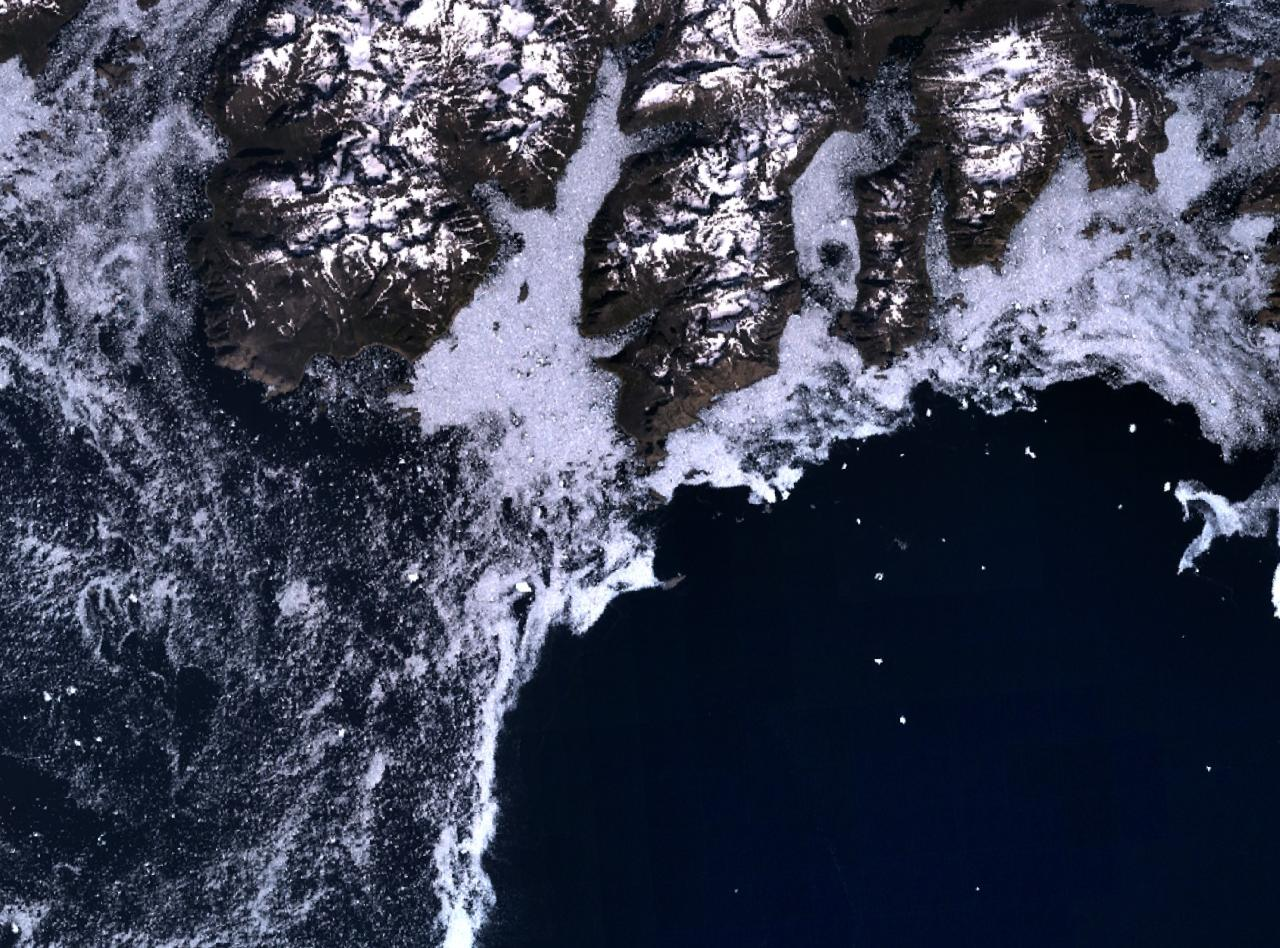
- Landsat image with Egger Island's headland Cape Farewell in the centre.

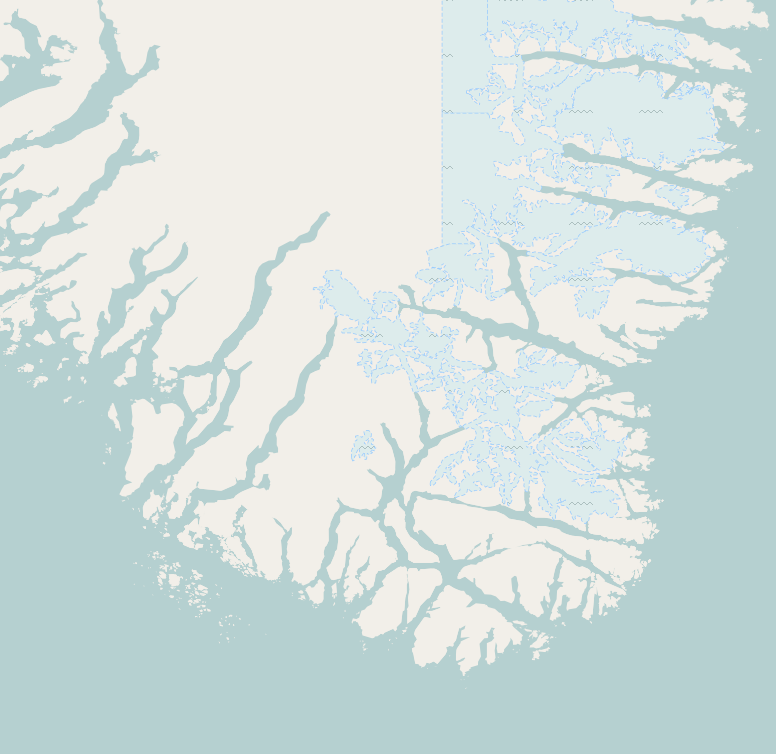
- Location of Egger Island in Greenland Egger Island (Greenland)
- Interactive map of Egger Island

Geography
- Coordinates: 59.89°N 43.90°W
- Archipelago: Cape Farewell Archipelago
- Adjacent to: North Atlantic Ocean
- Area: 307 km^{2} (119 sq mi)
- Area rank: 24th largest in Greenland
- Highest elevation: 1,251 m (4104 ft)
- Highest point: Akunap Qinguata

Administration
- Greenland
- Municipality: Kujalleq

Demographics
- Population: 0 (2023)
- Pop. density: 0/km^{2} (0/sq mi)
- Ethnic groups: none

Egger Island (Danish: Eggers Ø; Greenlandic: Itilleq, old spelling: Itivdleq) is Greenland's southernmost island. It is located in the Kujalleq municipality and is uninhabited.

== Geography ==
Egger Island is an important landmark for a small islet off Cape Farewell, its southern headland, is the southernmost point of Greenland. It is part of the Cape Farewell Archipelago (Nunap Isua).

The island has a deeply indented coastline and is separated from the neighbouring islands of the archipelago by narrow sounds. Qunnerit lies to the west, Sammisoq to the north and the smaller Avatdlerssuaq and Saningassoq to the east. Egger Island has an area of 308.8 km^{2} and a shoreline of 150.2 kilometres.

Cape Farewell lies at the island's southernmost tip, with a height of over 2000 feet; it is noted for bad weather.

== See also ==
- List of islands of Greenland
- List of countries by southernmost point
