= Sammisoq =

Island of Greenland

Native name: Christian IV Ø Nickname: Christian IV Island
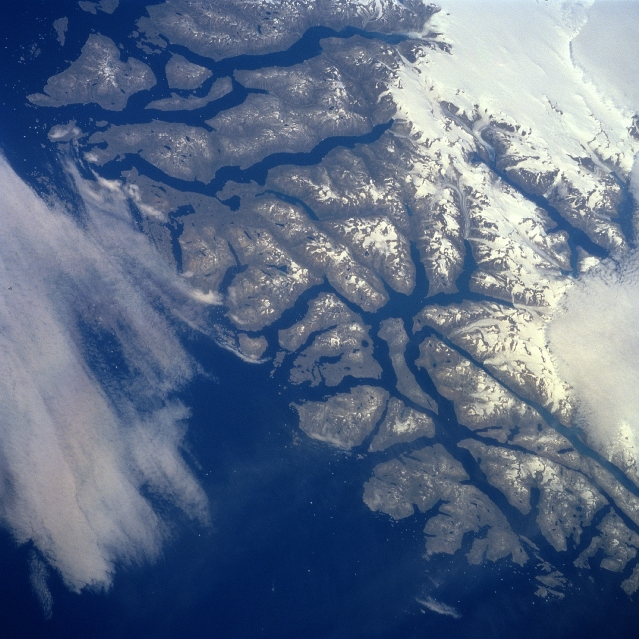
- Sammisoq in the bottom right.

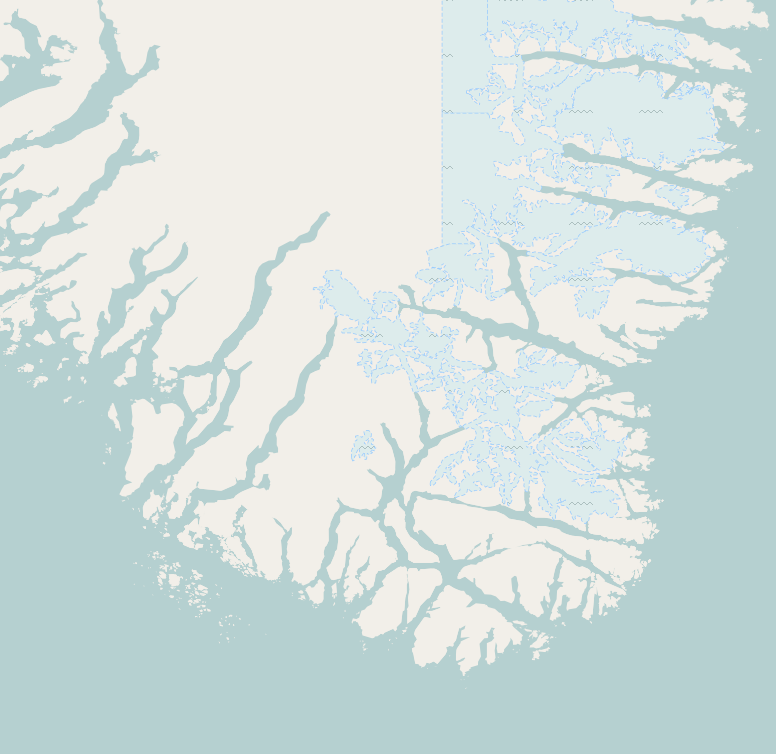
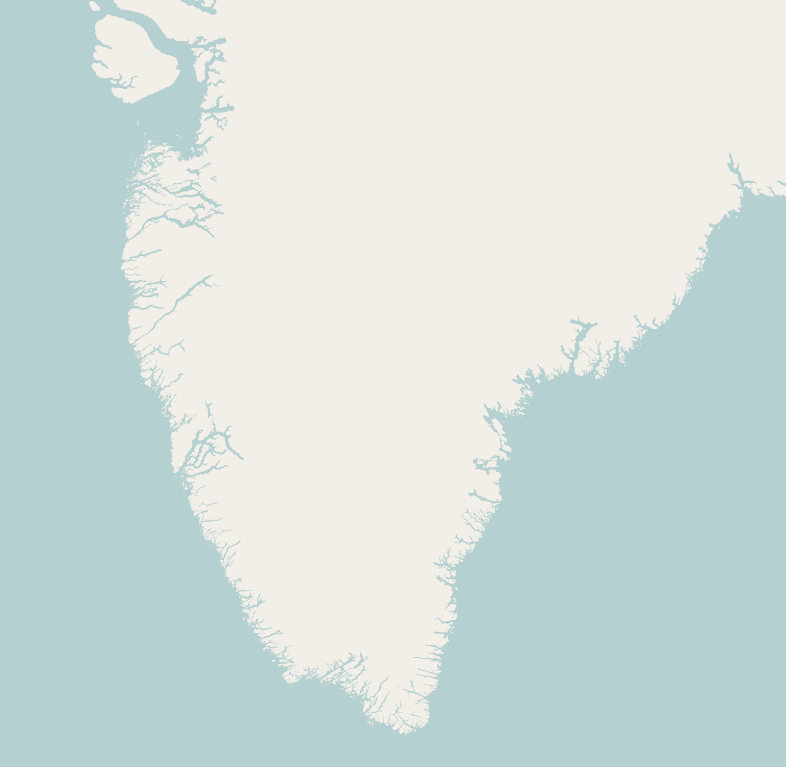
- Location of Sammisoq in Greenland Sammisoq (Southern Greenland) Sammisoq (Greenland)
- Interactive map of Sammisoq

Geography
- Location: Irminger Sea
- Coordinates: 60°03′10″N 43°41′12″W
- Archipelago: Nunap Isua Archipelago
- Adjacent to: North Atlantic Ocean
- Area: 659 km^{2} (254 sq mi)
- Area rank: 11th largest in Greenland
- Length: 60 km (37 mi)
- Highest elevation: 1,546 m (5072 ft)
- Highest point: Niaqornaq

Administration
- Greenland
- Municipality: Kujalleq
- Weather station: Ikerasassuaq

Demographics
- Population: 0 (2021)
- Pop. density: 0/km^{2} (0/sq mi)
- Ethnic groups: none

Sammisoq (old spelling Sangmissoq, Danish: Christian IV Ø; English traditional:Christian IV Island) is an island in the Kujalleq municipality in southern Greenland, located northeast of Uummannarsuaq cape. It is the largest island of the Cape Farewell Archipelago (Nunap Isua).

== Geography ==
Its area is 659 square kilometres (254 square miles) and at its largest length is 60 kilometres (37 miles). It is separated from mainland Greenland to the north by the narrow Prince Christian Sound. The island has glaciers in the south and in the west. Its coast is deeply indented and its southern part is almost separated from the main island by two narrow inlets. To the south lies Itilleq Island and to the west Annikitsoq, both part of the same group.

There is one settlement, Ikerasassuaq, also called Prince Christian Sound, Prins Christian Sund, or Bluie East One. It is a weather station and has no permanent population.

Sammisoq is mountainous and Niaqornaq, its highest point, is 1546 m above sea level. It is an ultra prominent peak, meaning a journey to any higher mountain involves descending more than 1500 m down before going up again, in this case down to sea level.

== See also ==
- List of islands of Greenland

== Bibliography ==
- Prostar (1 January 2005). Prostar Sailing Directions 2005 Greenland and Iceland Enroute. ProStar Publications. ISBN 978-1-57785-753-2.
