= Skinfaxe (glacier) =

Glacier in Greenland

- Skinfaxe Gletscher
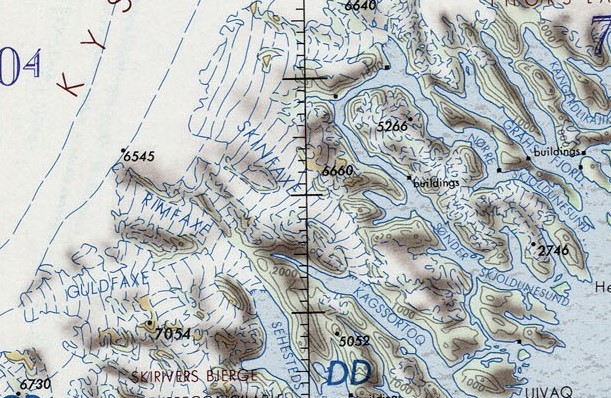
- Kattertooq and Sehested Fjords map section

- Location within Greenland
- Location: Greenland
- Coordinates: 63°25′N 42°0′W
- Terminus: Kattertooq, North Atlantic Ocean

Skinfaxe (Danish: Skinfaxe Gletscher) is a glacier of the King Frederick VI Coast in the Sermersooq municipality, southeastern Greenland.

This glacier is named after Skinfaxi, the cosmic horse of Norse mythology.

== Geography ==
Skinfaxe is a large, active glacier located on the eastern side of the Greenland ice sheet.

The Skinfaxe glacier flows roughly southeastward and has its terminus in the Kattertooq fjord shortly after its confluence with the Tjasse Glacier that joins it from the west.

== See also ==
- List of glaciers in Greenland
- Rimfaxe (glacier)
