= Aaluik =

Island in southeastern Greenland

Aaluik is an island in southeastern Greenland.

== Geography ==
Aaluik is part of the Sermersooq municipality, and is located near the entrance to the Timmiarmiut Fjord.
