= Garm (glacier) =

Glacier in East Greenland

- Garm Gletscher
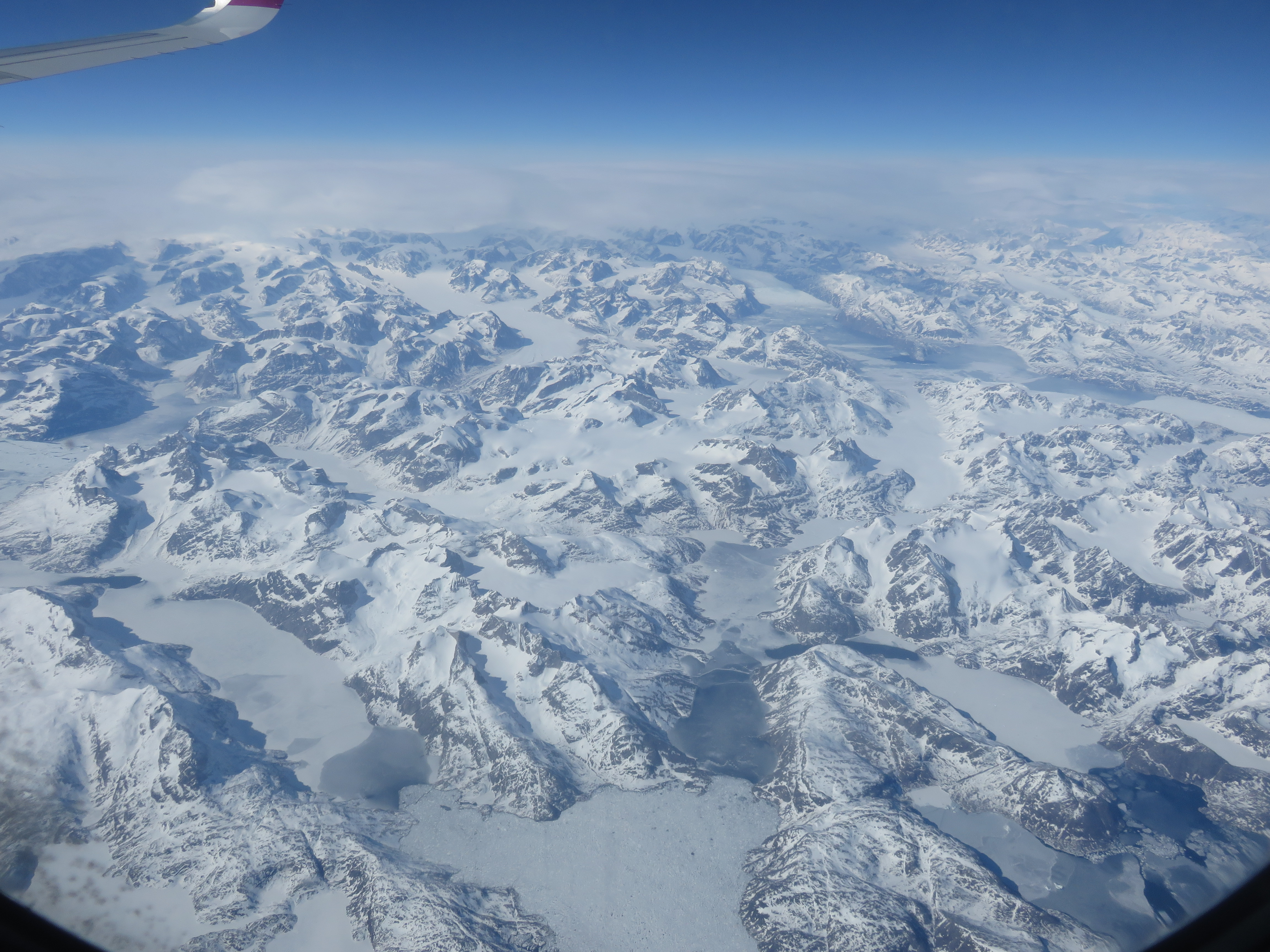
- Garm in 2018, near the top of the photo

- Location within Greenland
- Location: Greenland
- Coordinates: 63°5′N 42°29′W
- Terminus: Sehested Fjord and Timmiarmiut Fjord, North Atlantic Ocean

Garm (Danish: Garm Gletscher) is a glacier of the King Frederick VI Coast in the Sermersooq municipality, southeastern Greenland.

This glacier is named after Garm, the mythical dog that guards Hel's gate in Norse mythology.

== Geography ==
Garm is located on the eastern side of the Greenland ice sheet.

In its last stretch the Garm glacier flows eastward and splits into two branches, one continuing eastwards into the head of the Sikuijuitsoq, a branch of the Sehested Fjord (Uummannap Kangertiva) and the other bending southwards with its terminus in the Ernineq Fjord at the northern end of the Timmiarmiut Fjord system.

== See also ==
- List of glaciers in Greenland
