= Rimfaxe (glacier) =

Glacier in Greenland

- Rimfaxe Gletscher
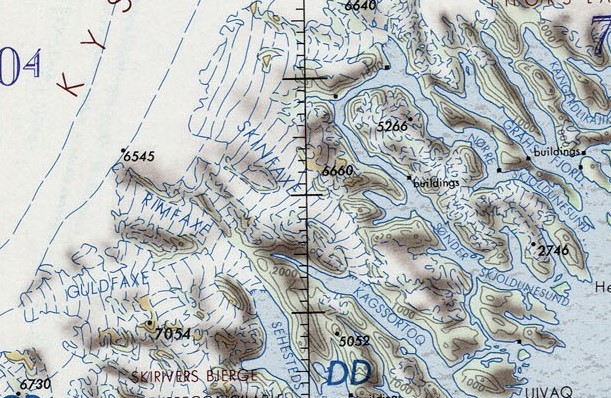
- Kattertooq and Sehested Fjords map section

- Location within Greenland
- Location: Greenland
- Coordinates: 63°18′N 42°25′W
- Terminus: Sehested Fjord, North Atlantic Ocean

Rimfaxe (Danish: Rimfaxe Gletscher) is a glacier of the King Frederick VI Coast in the Sermersooq municipality, southeastern Greenland.

This glacier is named after Hrimfaxi, the cosmic horse of Norse mythology.

== Geography ==
Rimfaxe is a large, active glacier flowing from the eastern side of the Greenland ice sheet.

The Rimfaxe glacier flows roughly southeastward between high peaks and has its terminus in the Sehested Fjord shortly after its confluence with the Guldfaxe Glacier that joins it from the west. The smaller Ygdrasil glacier flows to the east, running parallel to it, and has its terminus in a lake that discharges right by the terminus of the Rimfaxe.

== See also ==
- List of glaciers in Greenland
- Skinfaxe (glacier)
