= Niviarsiat (Kujalleq) =

Mountain in Kujalleq, Greenland

- Niviarsiat Qaqat
- Location within Greenland

Highest point
- Elevation: 1,300 m (4,300 ft)
- Coordinates: 61°25′N 45°13′W

Geography
- Location: Kujalleq, Greenland

Niviarsiat is a mountain in the Kujalleq municipality, southern Greenland.

== Geography ==
This mountain is a 1,300 m high summit with multiple peaks rising to the northeast of the Kiattuut Sermiat glacier.

Niviarsiat is located near the southern end of the Greenland ice sheet and is conspicuous.

== History ==
Wilhelm August Graah during his 1829 expedition, thought that he could see the Niviarsiat peaks from a hilltop of Griffenfeldt Island in the eastern coast of Greenland:

They were probably, the tops of Niviarsiet, or The Maidens, in the district of Juliana's Hope.

Despite the distance across the ice sheet, other authors regard Graah's conclusion as correct.

== See also ==
- List of mountains in Greenland
