= Timmiarmiut Fjord =

Fjord in Greenland

- Timmiarmiit Kangertivat (Greenlandic)
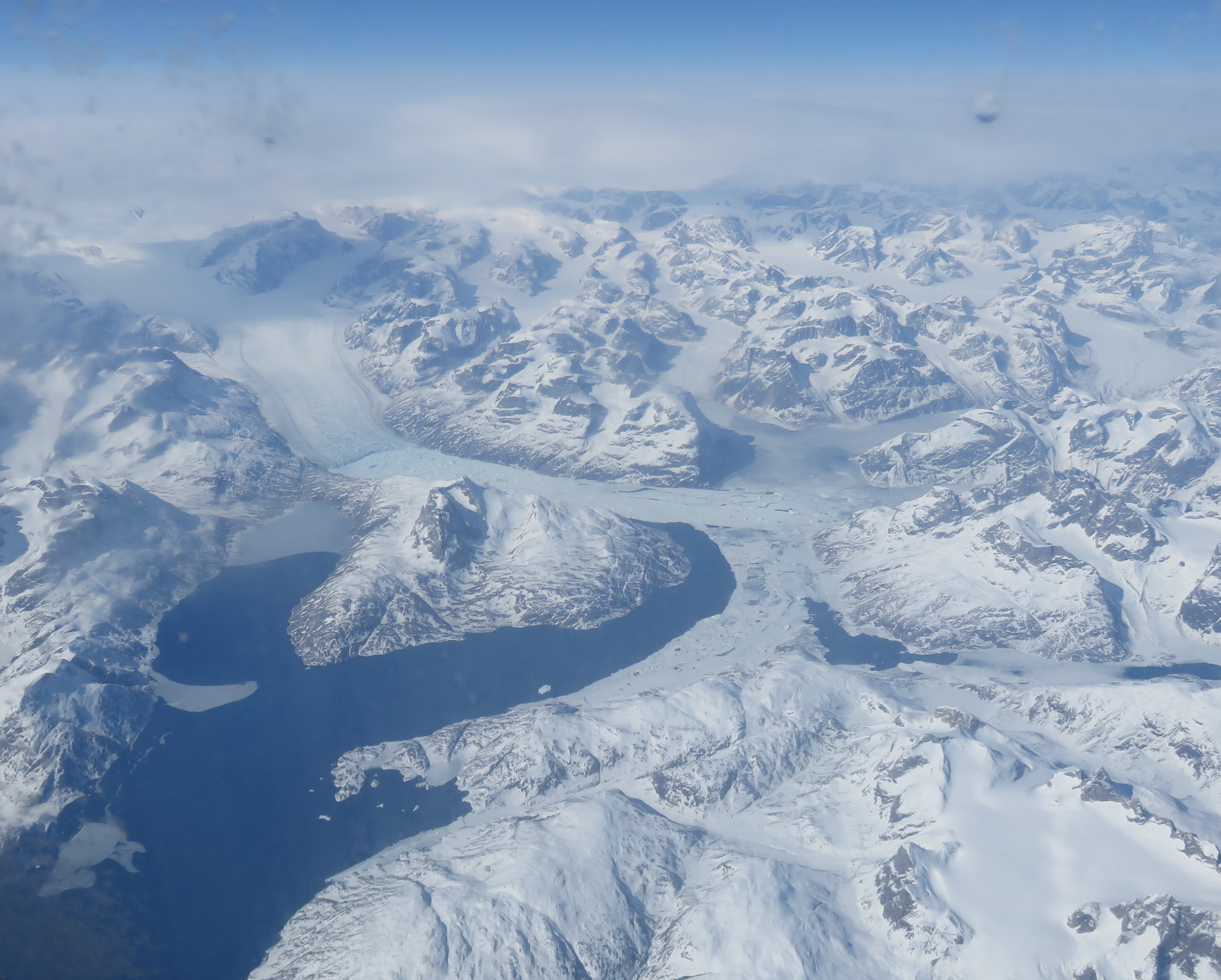
- View of the NW side of the fjord system with the terminus of the Heimdal Glacier

- Location in Greenland
- Location: Arctic (SE Greenland)
- Coordinates: 62°39′N 42°42′W
- Ocean/sea sources: North Atlantic Ocean
- Basin countries: Greenland
- Max. length: 50 km (31 mi)
- Max. width: 5 km (3.1 mi)

Timmiarmiut Fjord (old spelling 'Tingmiarmiut Fjord'; Greenlandic: Timmiarmiit Kangertivat)) is a fjord of the King Frederick VI Coast in the Sermersooq municipality, southeastern Greenland.

== Geography ==
Timmiarmiut Fjord is located north of Sikuijivitteq (Mogens Heinesen Fjord); to the east it opens into the North Atlantic Ocean with Aaluik, a 220 m high island by the shore of the large Timmiarmiit island, off the northern side of its mouth. On the southern side of its mouth lies the island of Immikkoortukajik and further east at the entrance 643 m high Uttorsiutit Island.

The inner part of Timmiarmiut Fjord is a fjord system with a pattern of large tributary fjords branching to the north, the main ones being the Hanseraq Fjord and the Ernineq Fjord. These fjord branches are often blocked by ice floes discharged from the active glaciers at the head, among which the Heimdal Glacier deserves mention. The Garm glacier in the north has two branches near its terminus, one flowing southwards into the Ernineq Fjord of the Timmiarmiut fjord system and the other eastwards into the Sikuijuitsoq, a branch of the Sehested Fjord (Uummannap Kangertiva) located north of the Timmiarmiut fjord system.

=== Mountains ===
The Snehatten, a 1,892.19 m (6,208.0 ft) high prominent peak, rises above the northern shore of the inner part of the fjord at 62°44′29″N 42°51′12″W.

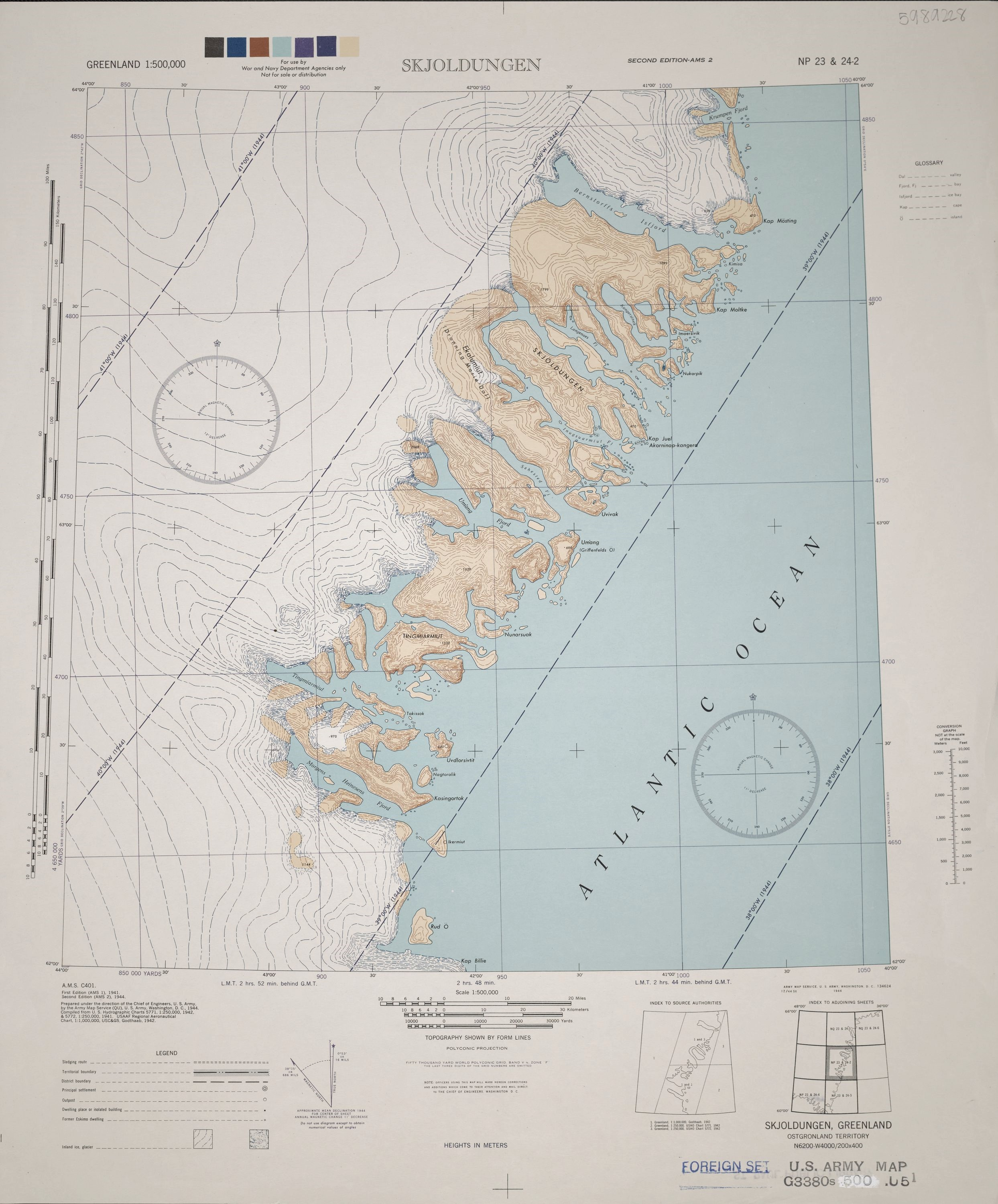
'Tingmiarmiut' Fjord in a 1944 map of the area around Skjoldungen.

== See also ==
- List of fjords of Greenland
