= Cape Farewell Archipelago =

Archipelago at the southern end of Greenland

Native name: Nunap Isua
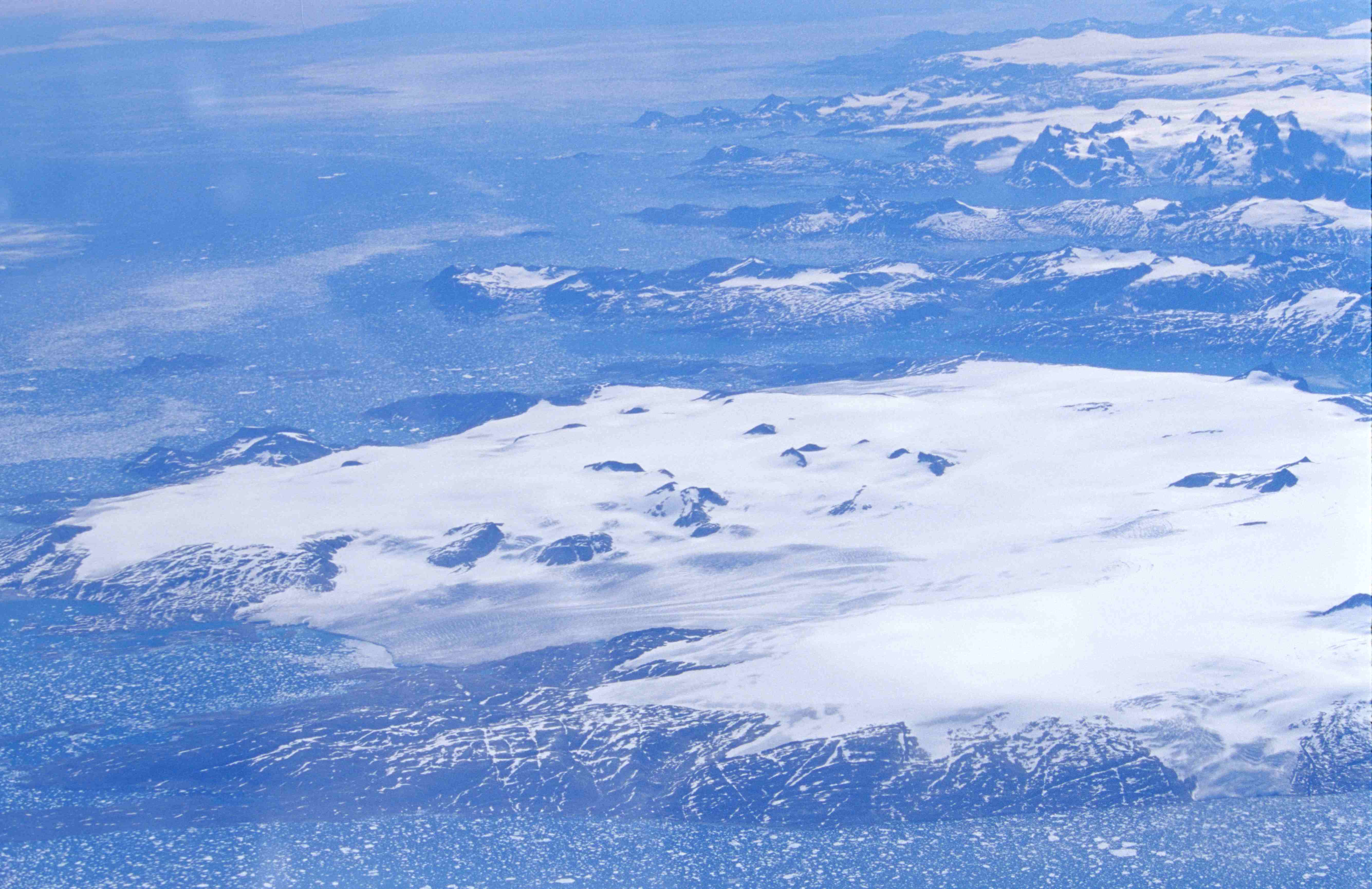
- View of the archipelago with its glaciers from a height of about 11,500 m
- Interactive map of Cape Farewell Archipelago

Geography
- Location: North Atlantic Ocean; Southern Greenland
- Coordinates: 59°49′N 43°35′W
- Major islands: Sammisoq, Egger, Ikeq, Avallersuaq
- Highest elevation: 1,546 m (5072 ft)
- Highest point: Christian IV Island HP

Administration
- Greenland
- Municipality: Kujalleq

Demographics
- Population: 0

Cape Farewell Archipelago (also Nunap Isua Archipelago) is an island group located at the southern end of Greenland in Kujalleq municipality. The archipelago takes its name from Cape Farewell, a headland of Egger Island (also known as Itilleq).

== Geography ==
The Cape Farewell Archipelago is separated from the mainland's south coast by Prince Christian Sound in the north and by the Torsukattak Fjord in the west. The main islands of the group are characterized as large and mountainous, surrounded by fjord-like passages. There are also several islets and rocks.

=== Islands ===
Sammisoq (Christian IV Island) is the largest island of the archipelago. Other significant islands include Egger Island (Itilleq), the southernmost of the group, Nunarsuaq (Nunarssuak), Pamialluk, Annikitsoq, Qunnerit, Ikeq, Walkendorff and Qernertoq (Kasit), as well as the Avallersuaq and Saningassoq islets.

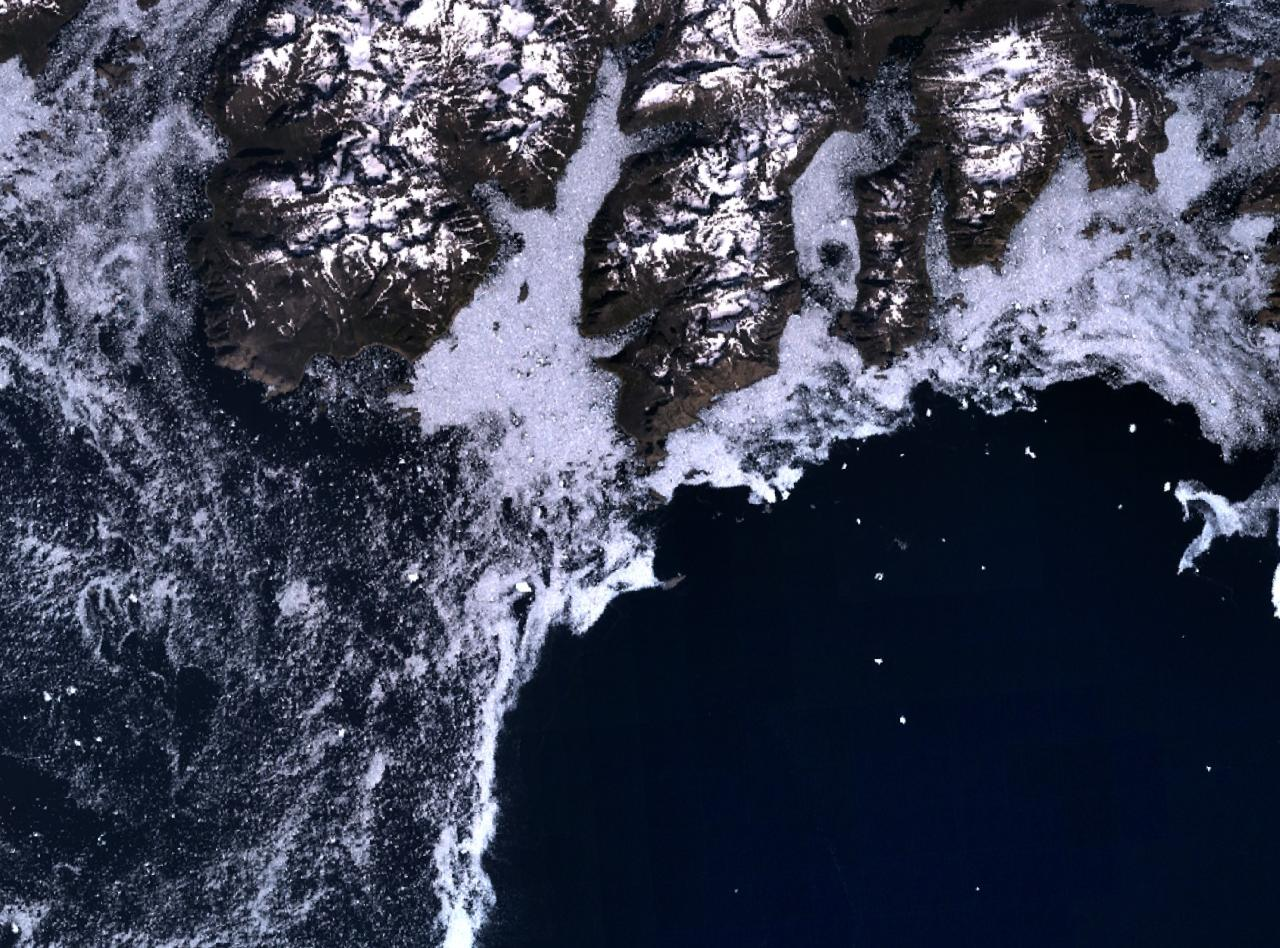
Landsat image with Egger Island's headland Cape Farewell in the centre.

== See also ==
- List of islands of Greenland

== Bibliography ==
- Prostar (1 January 2005). Prostar Sailing Directions 2005 Greenland and Iceland Enroute. ProStar Publications. ISBN 978-1-57785-753-2.
- United States. Hydrographic Office (1947). Publications.
