= Avallersuaq =

Island in Kujalleq, Greenland

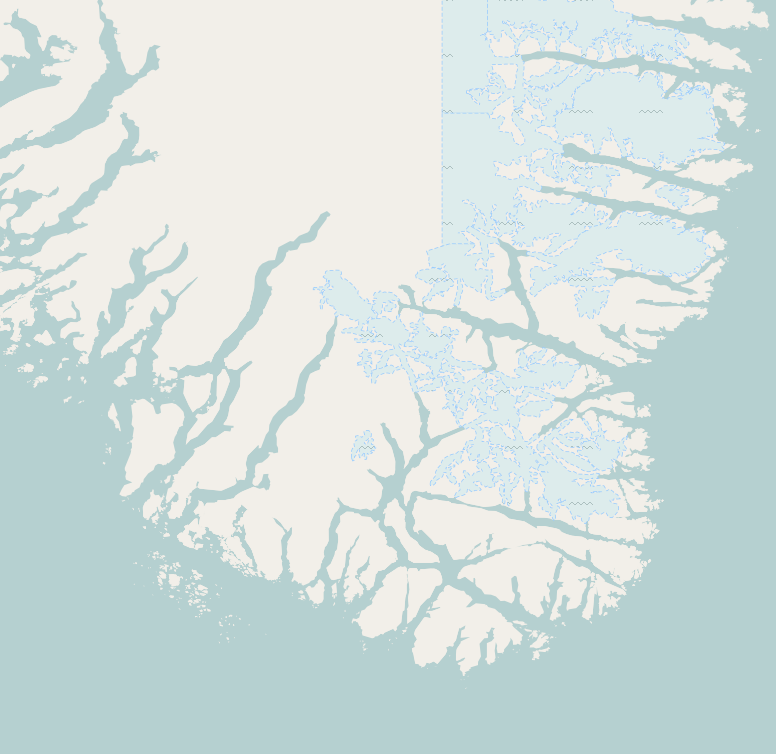
- Location of Avallersuaq in Greenland Avallersuaq (Greenland)
- Interactive map of Avallersuaq

Geography
- Location: Irminger Sea; Southern Greenland
- Coordinates: 59°49′N 43°35′W
- Archipelago: Nunap Isua Archipelago
- Adjacent to: North Atlantic Ocean
- Area: 4.30 km^{2} (1.66 sq mi)
- Length: 5.2 km (3.23 mi)
- Width: 2.0 km (1.24 mi)
- Highest elevation: 491 m (1611 ft)
- Highest point: Puto

Administration
- Greenland
- Municipality: Kujalleq

Demographics
- Population: 0 (2023)
- Pop. density: 0/km^{2} (0/sq mi)
- Ethnic groups: none

Avallersuaq, old spelling Avatdlerssuaq, is an uninhabited island of the Cape Farewell Archipelago in Kujalleq municipality of southern Greenland.

It is a small and rocky island located east of Itilleq Island (Egger). It has an elevation of 491 metres (1,611 ft). The small Saningassoq group of five islets lies to the north.

== See also ==
- List of islands of Greenland

== Bibliography ==
- Prostar (1 January 2005). Prostar Sailing Directions 2005 Greenland and Iceland Enroute. ProStar Publications. ISBN 978-1-57785-753-2.
