= Cape Farewell, Greenland =

Headland in Greenland

Cape Farewell Nunap Isua, Kap Farvel
- Cape
- Coordinates: 59°46′23″N 43°55′21″W
- Location: Kujalleq, Greenland
- Offshore water bodies: North Atlantic Ocean

Area
  - Total: Arctic

Cape Farewell (Greenlandic: Nunap Isua; Danish: Kap Farvel) is a headland on the southern shore of Egger Island, Nunap Isua Archipelago, Greenland. As the southernmost point of the country, it is one of the important landmarks of Greenland.

== Geography ==
Located at 59°46′23″N 43°55′21″W, excluding small offshore islets, this cape is the southernmost extent of Greenland, projecting out into the North Atlantic Ocean and the Labrador Sea on the same latitude as St Petersburg, Oslo and the Shetland Islands. Egger and the associated minor islands are known as the Cape Farewell Archipelago. The area is part of the Kujalleq municipality. King Frederick VI Coast stretches from Cape Farewell to Pikiulleq Bay (former spelling 'Pikiutdleq') in the north along the eastern coast of Greenland.

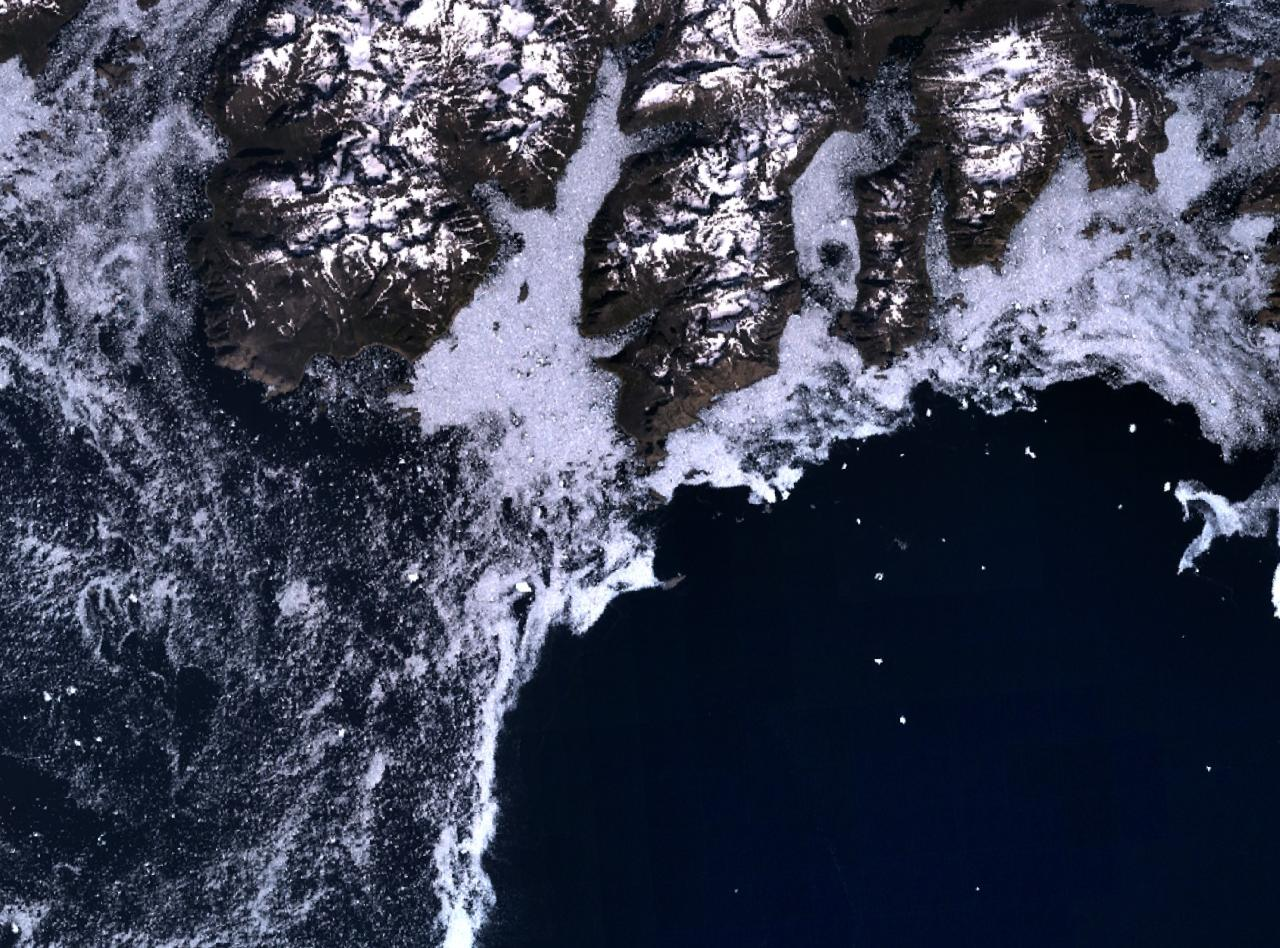
Cape Farewell (in the centre of the image) and the rugged southern coast of Egger Island. The coast (dark) is generally surrounded by sea ice, making navigation treacherous.

Uummannarsuaq amongst the extreme points of Greenland

=== Climate ===
Climate data for Cape Farewell (Angissoq) (normals 1991-2020, extremes 1991-2020)
Month	Jan	Feb	Mar	Apr	May	Jun	Jul	Aug	Sep	Oct	Nov	Dec	Year
Record high °C (°F)	9.6 (49.3)	9.3 (48.7)	9.3 (48.7)	12.0 (53.6)	14.3 (57.7)	14.1 (57.4)	16.1 (61.0)	16.0 (60.8)	15.0 (59.0)	13.8 (56.8)	11.2 (52.2)	9.7 (49.5)	16.1 (61.0)
Mean daily maximum °C (°F)	−1.1 (30.0)	−1.6 (29.1)	−0.9 (30.4)	1.5 (34.7)	3.5 (38.3)	5.4 (41.7)	6.7 (44.1)	7.2 (45.0)	6.2 (43.2)	3.9 (39.0)	1.7 (35.1)	0.1 (32.2)	2.7 (36.9)
Daily mean °C (°F)	−2.8 (27.0)	−3.3 (26.1)	−2.5 (27.5)	−0.1 (31.8)	1.7 (35.1)	3.2 (37.8)	4.5 (40.1)	5.2 (41.4)	4.5 (40.1)	2.4 (36.3)	0.3 (32.5)	−1.4 (29.5)	1.0 (33.8)
Mean daily minimum °C (°F)	−4.4 (24.1)	−5.0 (23.0)	−4.2 (24.4)	−1.8 (28.8)	−0.2 (31.6)	1.0 (33.8)	2.2 (36.0)	3.3 (37.9)	2.9 (37.2)	1.0 (33.8)	−1.1 (30.0)	−2.8 (27.0)	−0.8 (30.6)
Record low °C (°F)	−16.1 (3.0)	−15.9 (3.4)	−16.3 (2.7)	−9.5 (14.9)	−9.4 (15.1)	−5.1 (22.8)	−2.5 (27.5)	−2.8 (27.0)	−1.8 (28.8)	−6.2 (20.8)	−9.1 (15.6)	−13.0 (8.6)	−16.3 (2.7)
Average precipitation mm (inches)	98 (3.9)	67 (2.6)	67 (2.6)	77 (3.0)	50 (2.0)	53 (2.1)	71 (2.8)	65 (2.6)	68 (2.7)	73 (2.9)	72 (2.8)	92 (3.6)	853 (33.6)
Average precipitation days (≥ 1.0 mm)	15.2	11.6	12.1	12.4	8.8	6.1	6.6	7.9	7.2	8.4	8.3	13.5	118.1
Source: Danish Meteorological Institute

== See also ==
- List of countries by southernmost point
