= Heimdal Glacier =

Glacier in southern Greenland

- Heimdal Gletscher
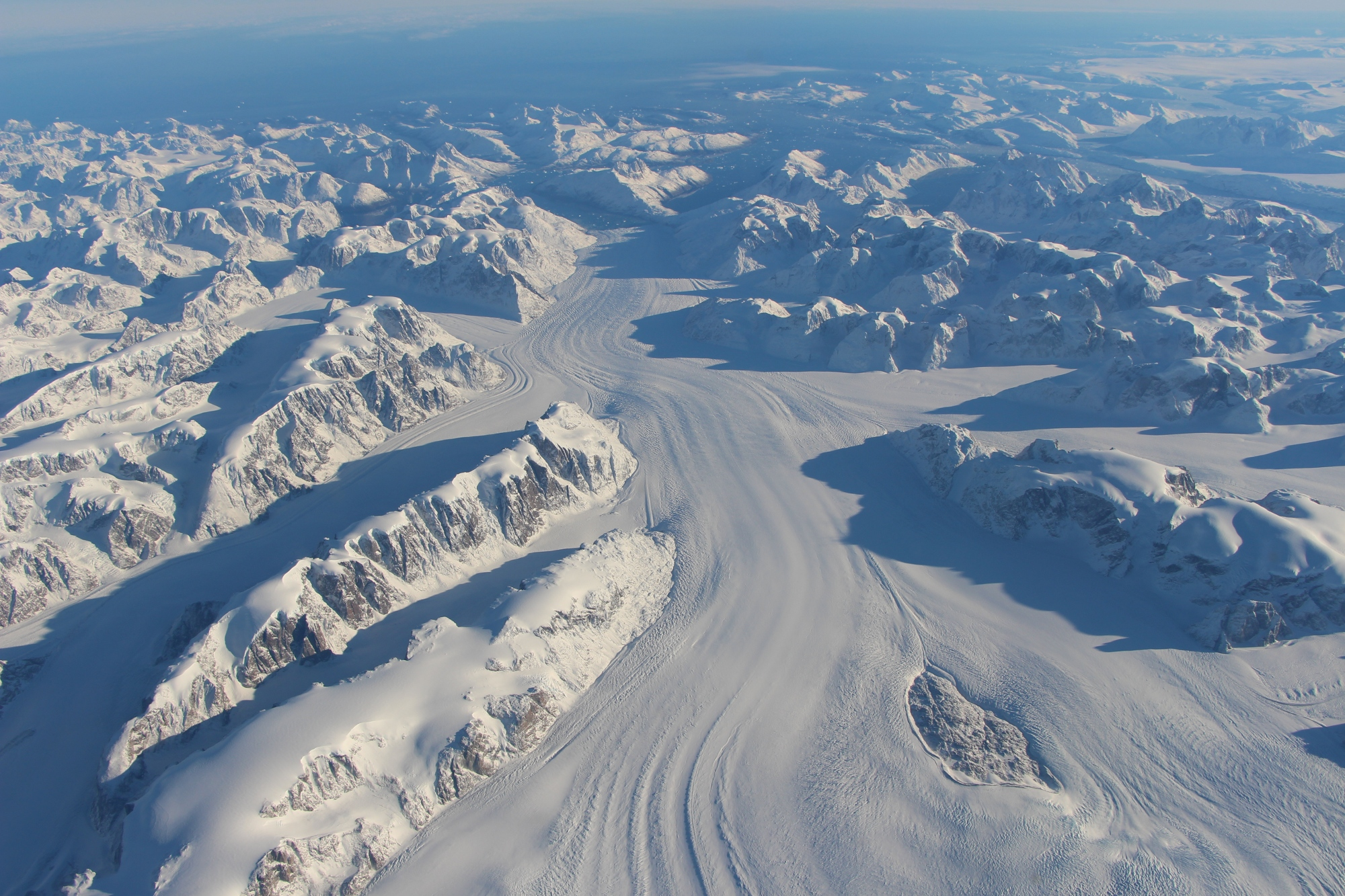
- NASA picture of the Heimdal Glacier

- Location within Greenland
- Location: Greenland
- Coordinates: 62°56′N 42°45′W
- Terminus: Timmiarmiut Fjord; North Atlantic Ocean

Heimdal Glacier (Danish: Heimdal Gletscher) is a glacier in southeastern Greenland. It flows into the head of the Timmiarmiut Fjord system of the King Frederick VI Coast, northwest of the island of Timmiarmiit. Its name derives from Heimdallr, a deity of Norse mythology.

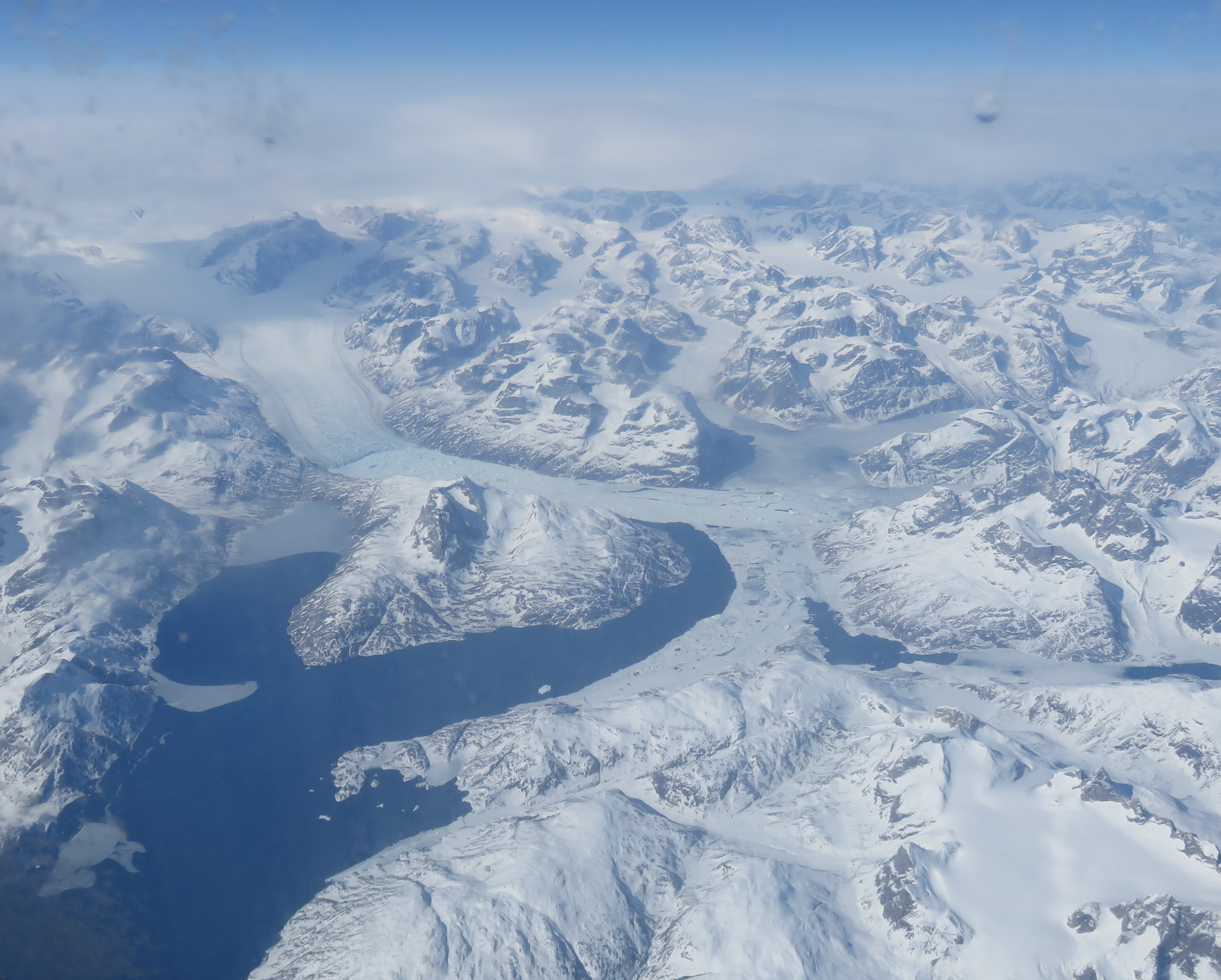
Heimdal Glacier in 2018

Heimdal Glacier in southeastern Greenland shows a regular speed up and slow down with the seasons. Peak speeds are around May/June, and low speeds occur in September/October.

== See also ==
- List of glaciers in Greenland
