= List of fjords of Greenland =

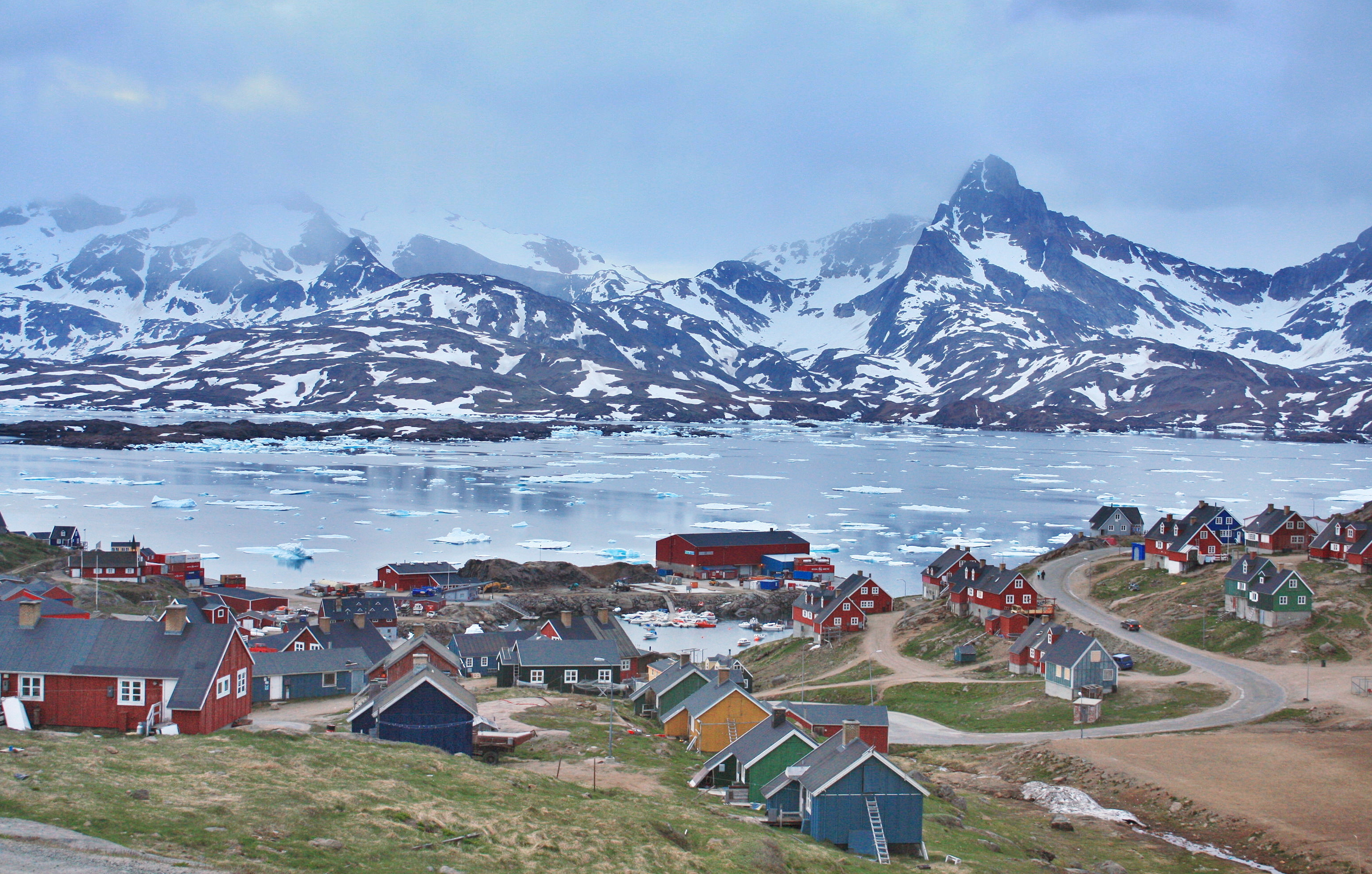
Tasiilaq Fjord opens into the bay in the North Atlantic south of the wide mouth of Ammassalik Fjord.

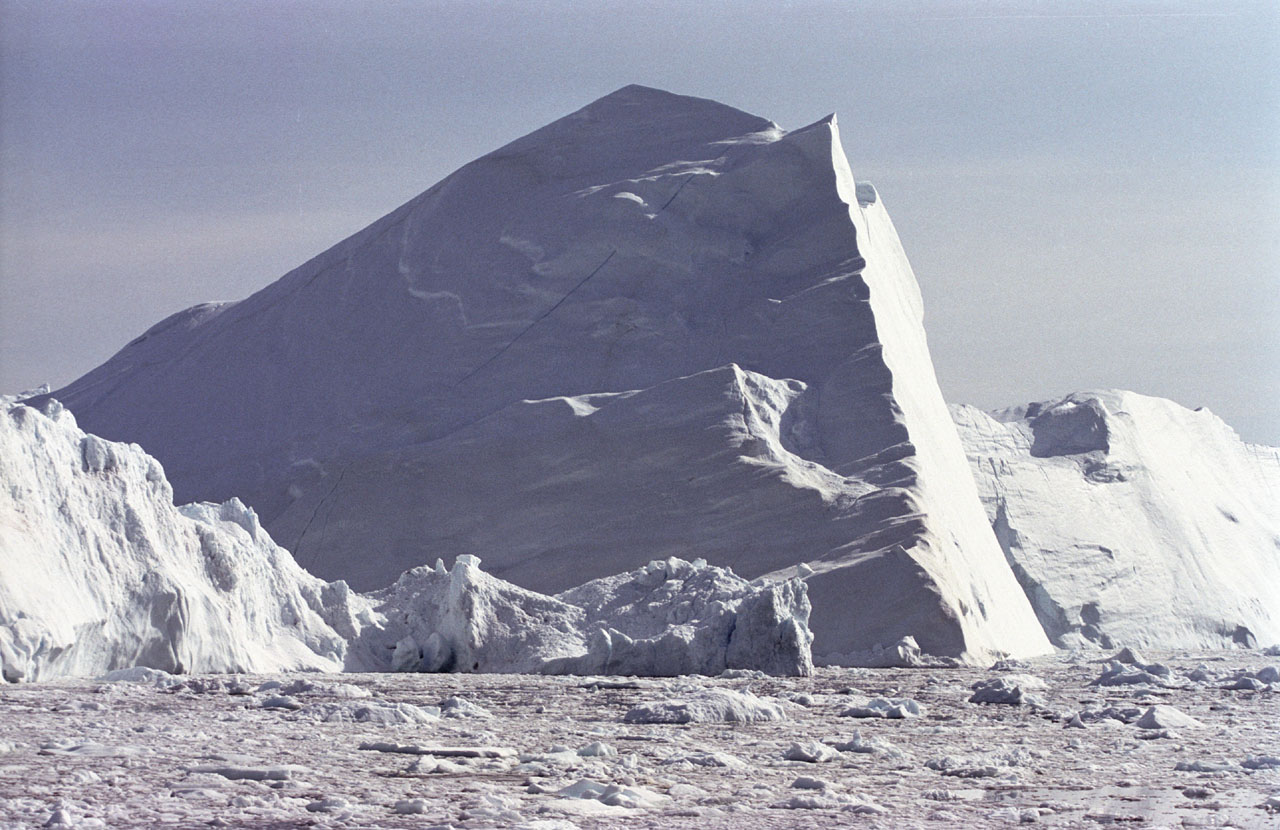
Ilulissat Icefjord, a UNESCO World Heritage Site.

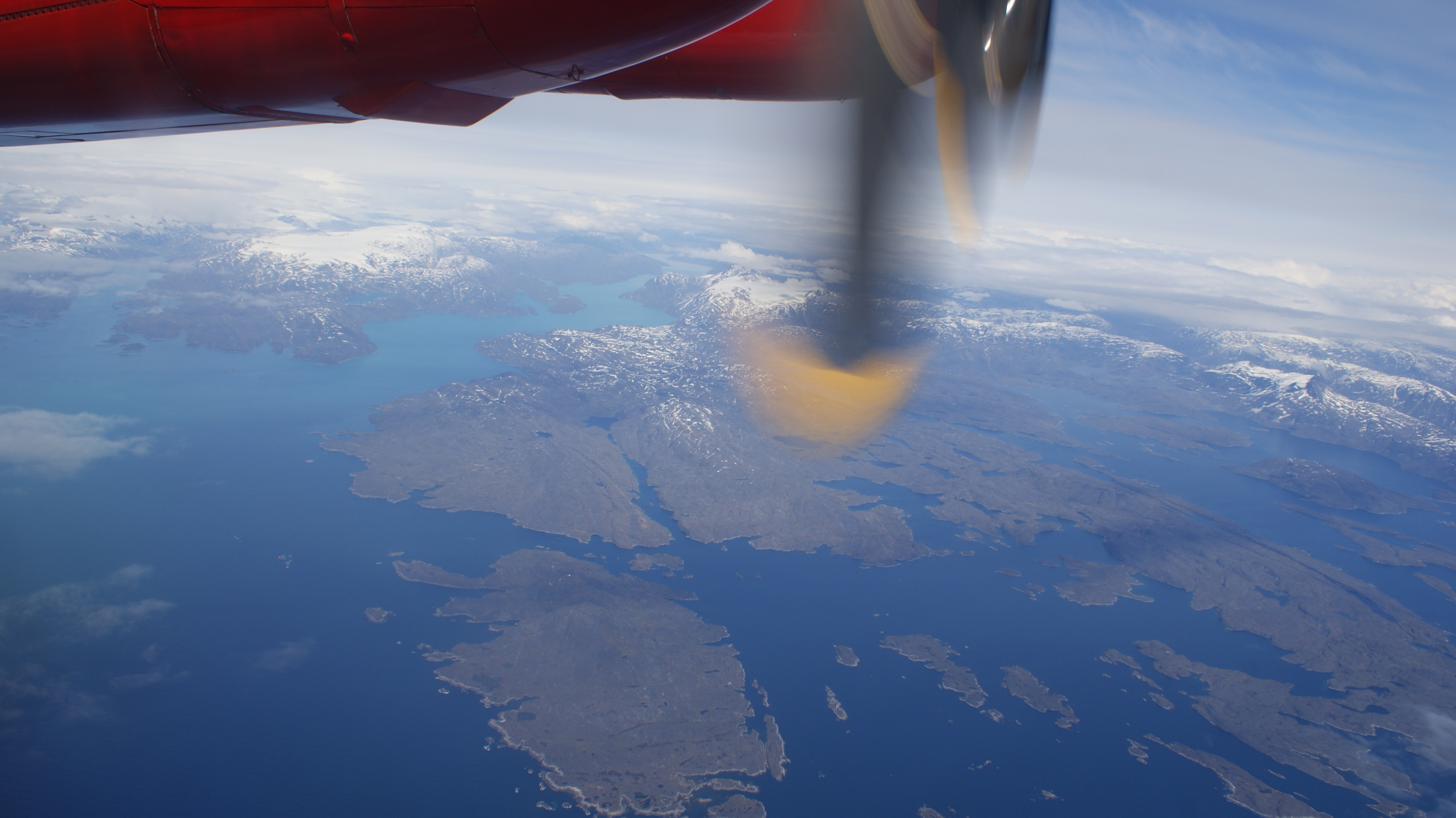
Aerial view of Isortoq Fjord (upper left).

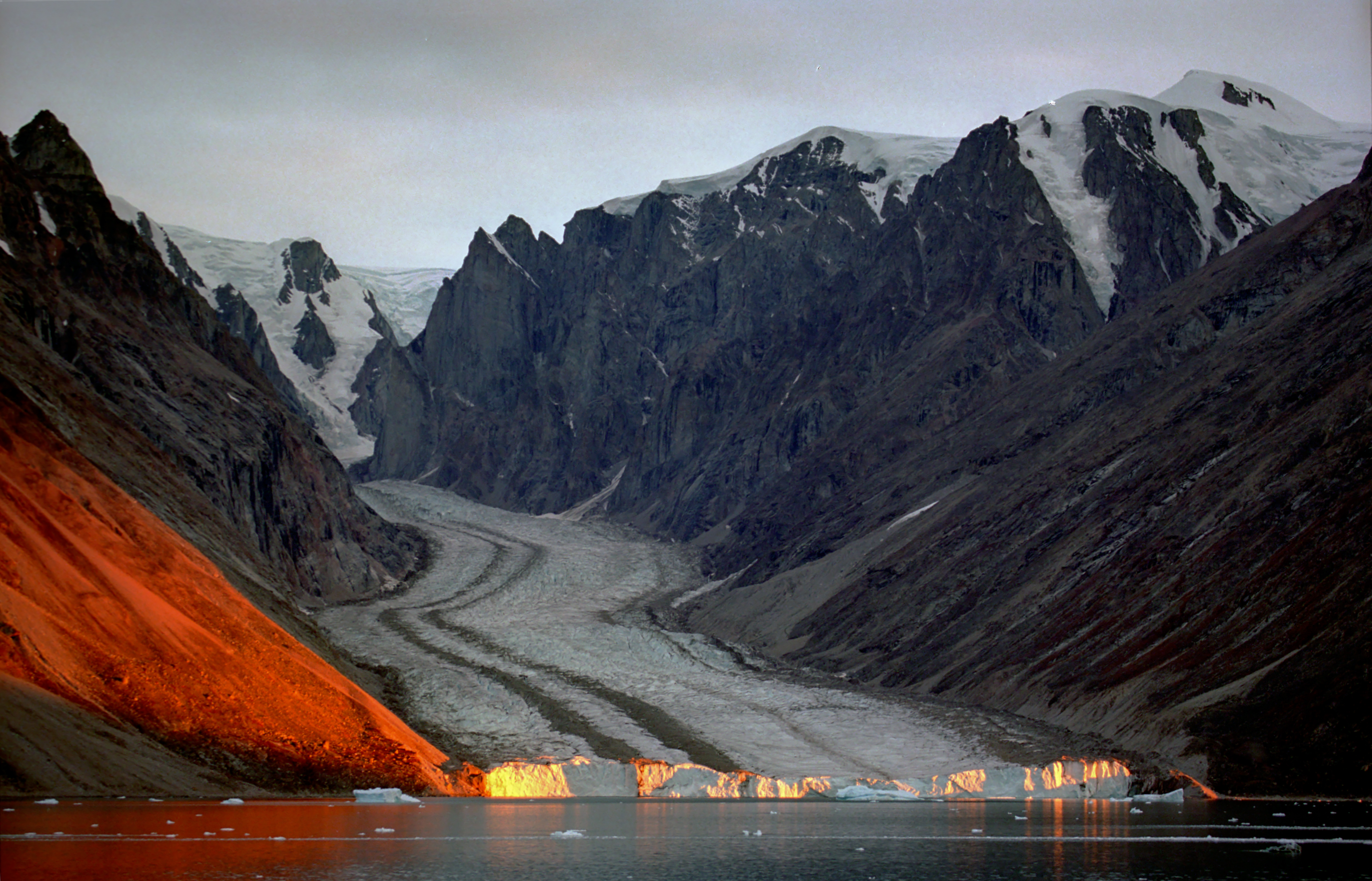
A glacier in Kaiser Franz Joseph Fjord.

This is a list of the most important fjords of Greenland:

== Fjords ==
- Alanngorsuaq Fjord
- Aleqatsiaq Fjord
- Alluitsup Kangerlua (Lichtenau Fjord)
- Ameralik Fjord
- Amerloq Fjord
- Ammassalik Fjord
- Ananap Kangertiva Kiateq
- Anaanap Kangertiva Oqqorseq (Depot Fjord)
- Anorituup Kangerlua
  - Kangikitsua
- Attertia
- Ardencaple Fjord
  - Bredefjord
  - Smallefjord
- Arfersiorfik Fjord
- Avaqqat Kangerluat
  - Puiattoq
  - Qassialik
- Bernstorff Fjord
- Bessel Fjord
- Bessel Fjord, NW Greenland
- Bowdoin Fjord
- Carlsberg Fjord (Kangerterajitta Itterterilaq)
- Cass Fjord
- Danmark Fjord
- De Dodes Fjord
- Deichmann Fjord
- Dickson Fjord (branch of King Oscar Fjord notable due to the September 2023 rockslide and associated 9-day seismic event caused by a seiche megatsunami)
- Dijmphna Sound
  - Hekla Sound
- Eqalugaarsuit Fjord
- Fleming Fjord
- Foulk Fjord
- Frederick E. Hyde Fjord
- Graah Fjord (Akorninnarmiit Oqqummut Kangertivat)
  - Jaette Fjord
- Grandjean Fjord
- Granville Fjord
- Grevel Fjord
- Gyldenløve Fjord (Umiiviip Kangertiva)
- Hagen Fjord
- Hartz Sound
- Hellefjord
- Igtip Kangertiva (Comanche Bay)
- Igutsaat Fjord
- Ikerasak Fjord
- Ikersuaq (Bredefjord)
  - Northern Sermilik
  - Qaleragdlit Imâ
  - Kangerlua
- Ikersuaq, East Greenland (Ikertivaq)
  - Eastern Tasiissaq
  - Western Tasiissaq
- Ikertivaq (Ikersuaq)
- Ikertooq Fjord
- Ikka Fjord
- Iliartalik
- Ilulissat Icefjord
  - Sikuiuitsoq
- Ingolf Fjord
- Iluileq Fjord (Danell Fjord)
- Isortoq Fjord
- J. A. D. Jensen Fjord
- J. C. Jacobsen Fjord
- Johan Petersen Fjord
- Kanajoorartuut Kangerluat
- Kangaamiut Kangerluarsuat Fjord
- Kangerlikajik
- Kangerluaraq
- Kangerluarsuk Fjord
- Kangerluarsuk Tulleq
- Kangerluarsunnguaq Fjord
- Kangerluk Fjord
- Kangerluluk
- Kangerlussuaq Fjord
- Kangerlussuaq Fjord, East Greenland
- Kangerlussuaq Fjord, Kangeq
- Kangerlussuaq Icefjord
- Kangerlussuatsiaq Fjord (Evighedsfjord)
- Kangersivartikajik (Kangerdluarssikajik)
  - Sammileq
- Kangertittivatsiaq
  - Nordfjord
  - Sammilik
- Karrat Fjord
- Kattertooq
- Kialernup Kangerlua
- Kivioq Fjord
- Knighton Fjord
- Kuutseq
  - Qassit
- Lindeman Fjord
  - Fligely Fjord
- Lindenow Fjord (Kangerlussuatsiaq)
  - Norrearm
  - Sondrearm
- MacCormick Fjord
- Miki Fjord
- Mørkefjord
- Nansen Fjord
- Nanûseq Fjord (Annikitsup Kangerlua)
  - Noret
- Napasorsuaq Fjord (Napasorsuup Kangerlua)
- Nasaussap Saqqaa
- Nathorst Fjord
- Nattoralik
- Newman Fjord
- Nigertuluk
- Nioghalvfjerd Fjord
- Nordre Isortoq Fjord
- Nuup Kangerlua
- Nuussuup Kangia
- Paatusoq
- Perlerfiup Kangerlua
- Petermann Fjord
- Poulsen Fjord
- Quseertaliip Kangertiva
- Romer Fjord
- Ryberg Fjord
- Saqqarsuaq Fjord
- Savary Fjord
- Sehested Fjord (Uummannap Kangertiva)
  - Annat Fjord
  - Sikuijuitsoq
- Sermilik (Sermiligaaq)
- Sherard Osborn Fjord
- Sikuijivitteq (Mogens Heinesen Fjord)
- Siorapaluup Kangerlua (Robertson Fjord)
- Southern Sermilik
- St George Fjord
- Sullua Fjord
- Tasermiut Fjord
- Torsukattak Fjord (Disko Bay)
- Tunulliarfik Fjord
  - Qooroq Fjord
- Tuttilik
- Ukkusissat Fjord
- Upernavik Icefjord
- Uummannaq Fjord
- Uunartoq Fjord
- Vahl Fjord
- Vedel Fjord
- Wolstenholme Fjord

== Fjord areas ==
- Godthab Gulf
  - Loch Fyne
  - Wordie Bay (Greenland)
  - Copeland Fjord
    - Granta Fjord
  - Young Sound
    - Tyrolerfjord
- Independence Fjord
  - Astrup Fjord
  - Jørgen Brønlund Fjord
  - Hagen Fjord
- Inglefield Bredning
  - Bowdoin Fjord
  - Academy Fjord
  - Olrik Fjord
- Iittuarmiit (Southern Skjoldungen Fjord)
  - Balder Fjord
  - Halvdan Fjord
  - Yrsas Fjord
  - Pulaqqaviip Ikaasaa (Morkesund)
  - Qimutuluittiip Kangertiva (Northern Skjoldungen Fjord)
    - Hermod Vig
    - Norrevig
- Kaiser Franz Joseph Fjord
  - Dusenfjord
  - Geologfjord
  - Isfjord
  - Kjerulffjord
  - Nordfjord
    - Muskox Fjord
- Kangerlussuaq Fjord, East
  - Amdrup Fjord
  - Courtauld Fjord
  - Nordfjord
  - Watkins Fjord
- Kangersuneq
  - Dragsfjord
  - Fylla Vig
  - Magne Fjord
  - Mode Fjord
- Kangertittivatsiaq
  - Arpertilo (Vestfjord)
  - Nordfjord
  - Sammilik
- King Oscar Fjord
  - Antarctic Sound
  - Sofia Sound
  - Kempe Fjord
    - Dickson Fjord
    - Rohs Fjord
    - Rhedin Fjord
  - Narwhal Sound
  - Segelsällskapet Fjord
    - Alpefjord
    - Forsbladfjord
  - Antarctic Haven
  - Skeldal
  - Vega Sound
  - Davy Sound
- Peary Land
  - Benedict Fjord
  - De Long Fjord
    - Thomas Thomsen Fjord
    - Adolf Jensen Fjord
    - O.B. Bøggild Fjord
  - Frederick E. Hyde Fjord
    - Citronen Fjord
    - Freja Fjord
    - Frigg Fjord
    - Odin Fjord
    - Thor Fjord
  - G.B. Schley Fjord
    - Ormen
  - Gardiner Fjord
  - Hellefiske Fjord
  - Hunt Fjord
  - J.P. Koch Fjord
    - Navarana Fjord
  - Jewell Fjord
  - Lemming Fjord
  - Mascart Sound
  - Nordenskiöld Fjord
  - Sands Fjord
  - Victoria Fjord
  - Weyprecht Fjord
    - Conger Sound
    - Harder Fjord
- Prince Christian Sound
  - Kangerluk Fjord
  - Ikeq Fjord
  - Akuliarutsip Imaa (Ikerasak Fjord)
  - Ilua Fjord
  - Torsukattak Fjord
  - Utoqqarmiut Fjord (Pamialluup Kujatinngua)
- Scoresby Sound
  - Fonfjord
    - Rode Fjord
    - Vestfjord
  - Gaasefjord
  - Hurry Inlet
  - Ofjord
    - Hare Fjord
    - Rype Fjord
    - Snesund
  - Nordvestfjord
    - Flyver Fjord
- Sermilik
  - Johan Petersen Fjord
    - Stoklund Fjord
  - Helheim Fjord
  - Ningerti
- Skaer Fjord
  - Penthievre Fjord
  - H.G. Backlundfjord
  - C.F.Mourier Fjord
  - V. Clausen Fjord
- Timmiarmiut Fjord
  - Ernineq Fjord
  - Hanseraq Fjord
  - Igtâsiartikajîp Kangertiva
  - Navfalik Fjord
  - Tajarnikajîp Kangertiva

== Landlocked fjords ==
- Agnete Lake (Agnete Sø)
- Annex Lake (Annekssøen)
- Centrum Lake (Centrumsø)
- Elizabeth Sharon Lake (Elizabeth Sharon Sø)
- Romer Lake (Romer Sø)
- Seal Lake (Sælsøen)

== See also ==
- Ammassalik wooden maps
- List of glaciers in Greenland
