= Kobbefjord =

Kobbefjord or Kobbefjorden may refer to the following landforms:

- Kobbefjorden, a small fjord in Svalbard, Norway
- Kangerluarsunnguaq Fjord (Danish: Kobbefjord), a small fjord in southwestern Greenland
