= Barclay Bay, Greenland =

Bay in Sermersooq, Greenland

Barclay Bay
- Barclay Bugt
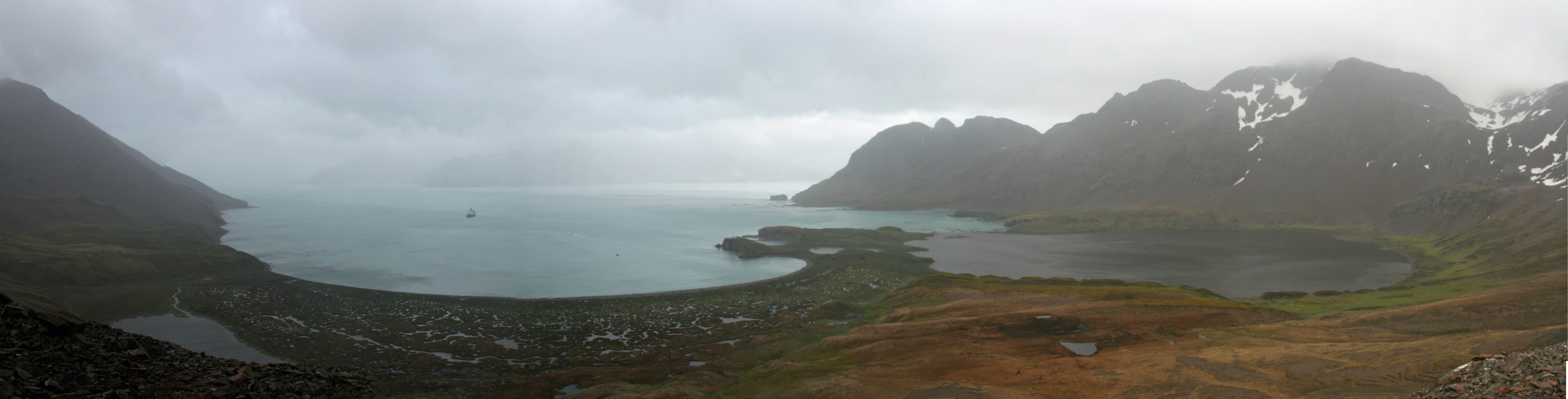
- Barclay Bay in 1955

- Location in Greenland
- Location: Arctic
- Coordinates: 69°14′N 25°1′W
- Ocean/sea sources: Denmark Strait
- Basin countries: Greenland
- Max. length: 14 km (8.7 mi)
- Max. width: 5 km (3.1 mi)

Barclay Bay (Danish: Barclay Bugt) is a bay in King Christian IX Land, Eastern Greenland. The area of the bay is uninhabited. Administratively Barclay Bay and its surroundings belong to the Sermersooq municipality.

== Geography ==
Barclay Bay lies in the Blosseville Coast south of Knighton Fjord. It stretches for about 14 km (8.7 mi) from east to west. Its mouth lies between Cape Barclay to the northeast and Cape Ryder to the southwest. Høst Havn is a small, protected inlet located close to the northern side of the mouth

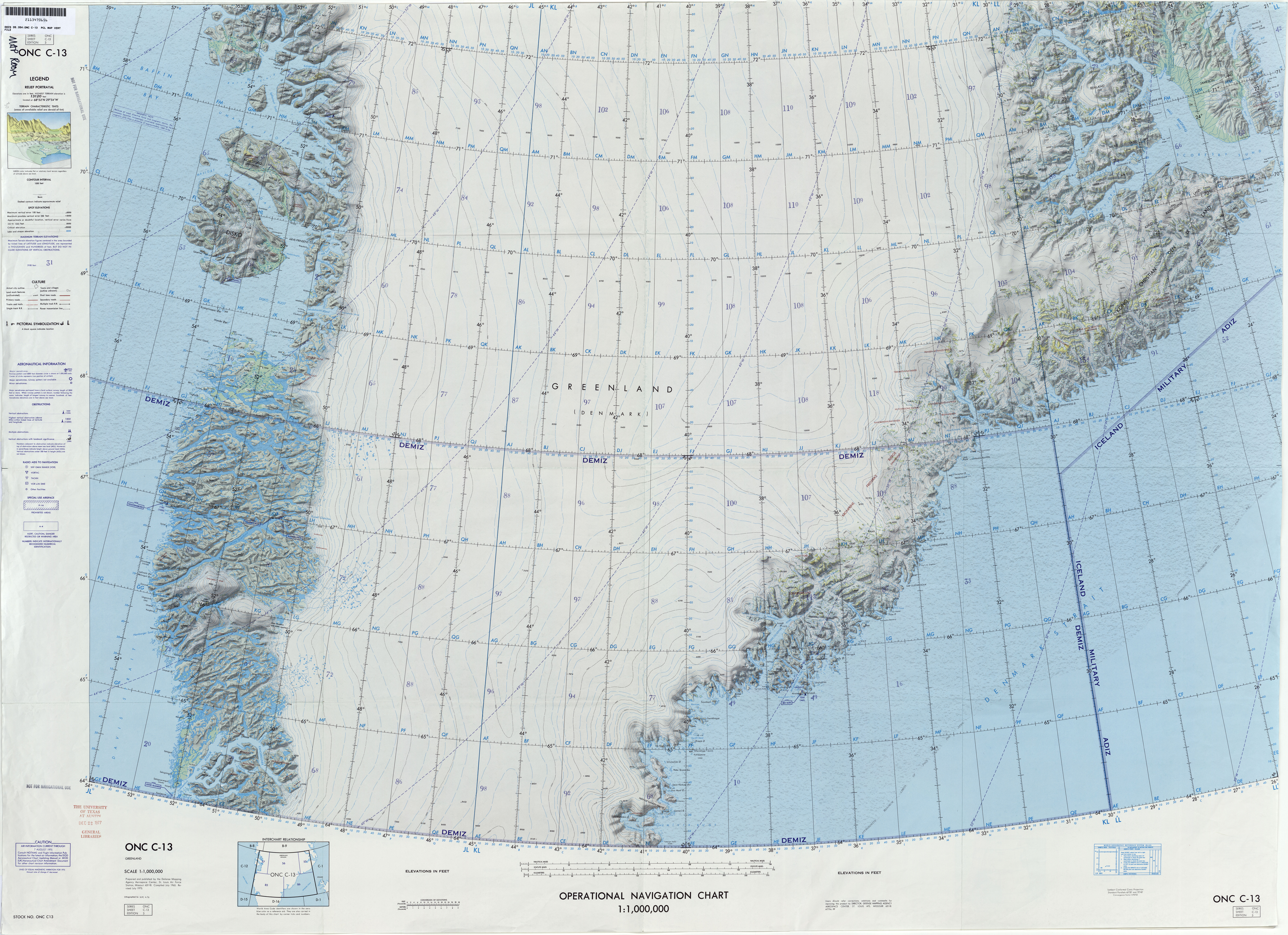
Map of Greenland section
