= Kangaamiut Kangerluarsuat Fjord =

Fjord in Greenland

Location within Greenland

Kangaamiut Kangerluarsuat Fjord (old spelling: Kangâmiut Kangerdluarssuat) is a fjord in the Qeqqata municipality in western Greenland. The fjord is located halfway between the lower runs of the long Kangerlussuaq Fjord in the north, and Kangerlussuatsiaq Fjord in the south, emptying into Davis Strait.

== Geography ==
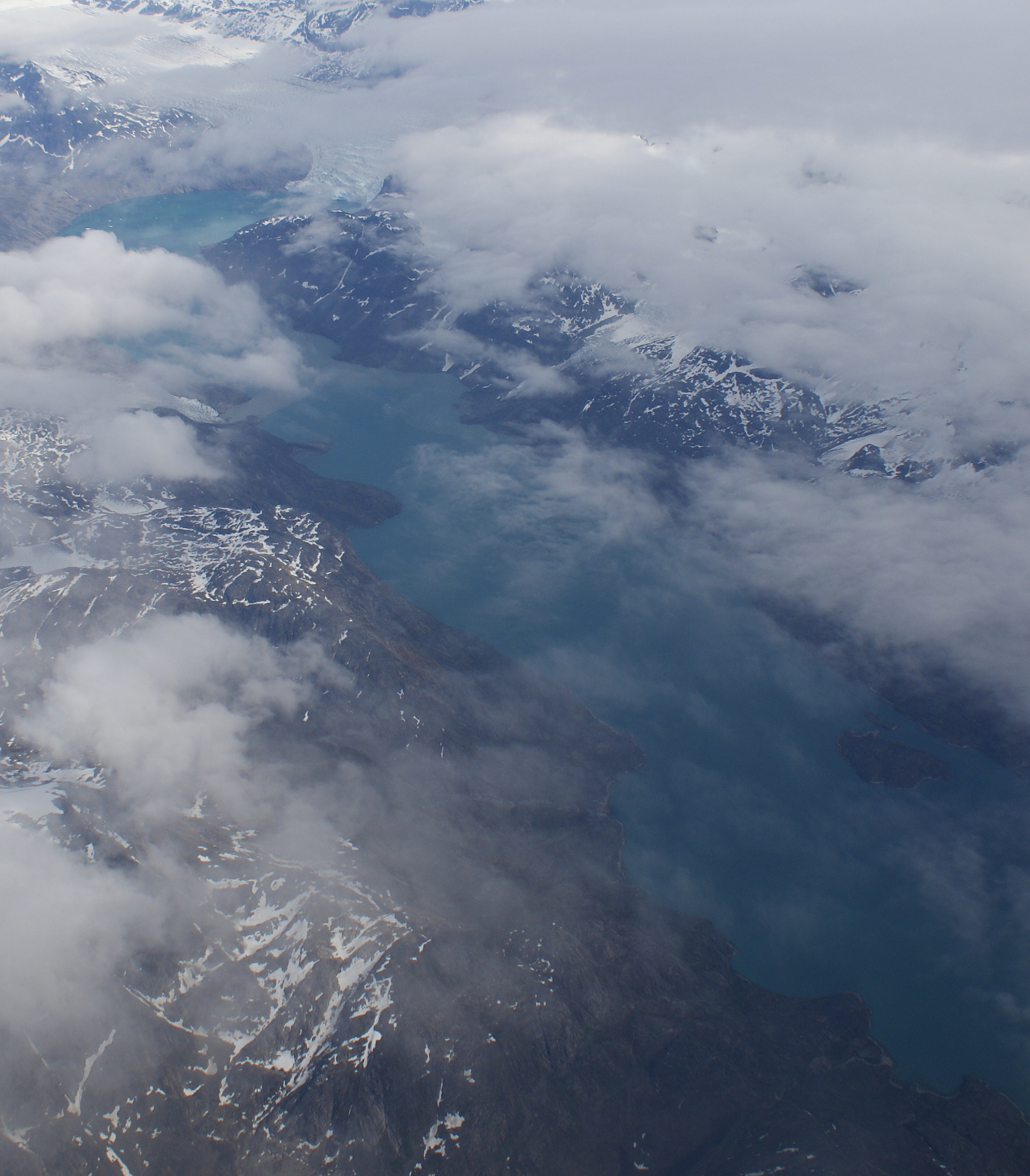
Aerial view of the middle and upper sections of the fjord.

The head of the fjord at 66°00′10″N 52°52′45″W is formed by the short Illorlersuaq icefjord flowing from the tidewater Sermitsiaq Glacier draining the Maniitsoq ice cap, now separated from the Greenland ice sheet (Greenlandic: Sermersuaq). The fjord flows southwestward, opening into Davis Strait, with its mouth dotted with several skerries.

== Settlement ==
Kangaamiut is the only settlement in the vicinity, located on a small island to the south of the fjord mouth.

== See also ==
- List of fjords of Greenland
