= Uummannaarsuk =

Island in Kujalleq, Greenland

- Interactive map of Uummannaarsuk

Geography
- Location: North Atlantic Ocean; Southern Greenland
- Coordinates: 61°49′N 42°4′W
- Highest elevation: 239 m (784 ft)

Administration
- Greenland
- Municipality: Sermersooq

Demographics
- Population: 0

Uummannaarsuk is an uninhabited island in the Sermersooq municipality in southern Greenland.

== Geography ==
Uummannaarsuk is a 239 m high island that lies off the southeastern coast of Greenland. It is located off Cape Cort Adelaer, to the NE of Cape Daniel Rantzau, both eastern headlands of an irregularly-shaped coastal island located on the northern side of the mouth of Napasorsuaq Fjord.

== See also ==
- List of islands of Greenland
