= Torsukattak =

Torsukattak (old spelling: Torssukátak) may refer to the following landforms in Greenland, from north to south:

- Torsukattak Strait (Upernavik Archipelago), a strait in the southern part of Upernavik Archipelago (72°33′00″N 54°59′20″W)
- Torsukattak Strait, a strait in the inner part of Uummannaq Fjord (70°57′10″N 51°47′00″W)
- Torsukattak Sound, a sound in Umivik Bay, Eastern Greenland (64°18′N 40°47′W)
- Torsukattak Fjord, a fjord in Southern Greenland (60°03′N 44°29′W)
- Torsukattak Fjord (Disko Bay), a fjord in Western Greenland (69°56′N 51°00′W)
