= Cape Cort Adelaer =

Headland in southeast Greenland

Cape Cort Adelaer Kap Cort Adelaer, Kangeq
- Headland
- Coordinates: 61°50′N 42°5′W
- Location: Sermersooq, Greenland
- Offshore water bodies: North Atlantic Ocean

Area
  - Total: Arctic
- Elevation: 707 m

Cape Cort Adelaer (Danish: Kap Cort Adelaer), also known as Cape Adelaer, is a headland in the North Atlantic Ocean, southeast Greenland, Sermersooq municipality. This cape is named after Norwegian seaman Cort Adeler (1622–1675) who distinguished himself for services rendered to the Royal Dano-Norwegian Navy.

== Geography ==
Cape Cort Adelaer is located in the northeast of an irregularly-shaped coastal island located on the northern side of the mouth of the Napasorsuaq Fjord. Cape Daniel Rantzau, the SE headland of the same island is located 7.2 km to the south.

Small Uummannaarsuk island lies 2 km to the southeast of the cape. The dangerous active glacier Puisortoq is located to the north.

== History ==
Cape Cort Adelaer weather station was built and staffed on this headland by the Allies during World War II. It was established by Major John T. Crowell in 1943, at the same time that the Comanche Bay facility was reestablished. At that time there was another weather station on Skjoldungen further north up the coast.
