= Sermitsiaq Glacier =

Glacier in Qeqqata, Greenland

Sermitsiaq
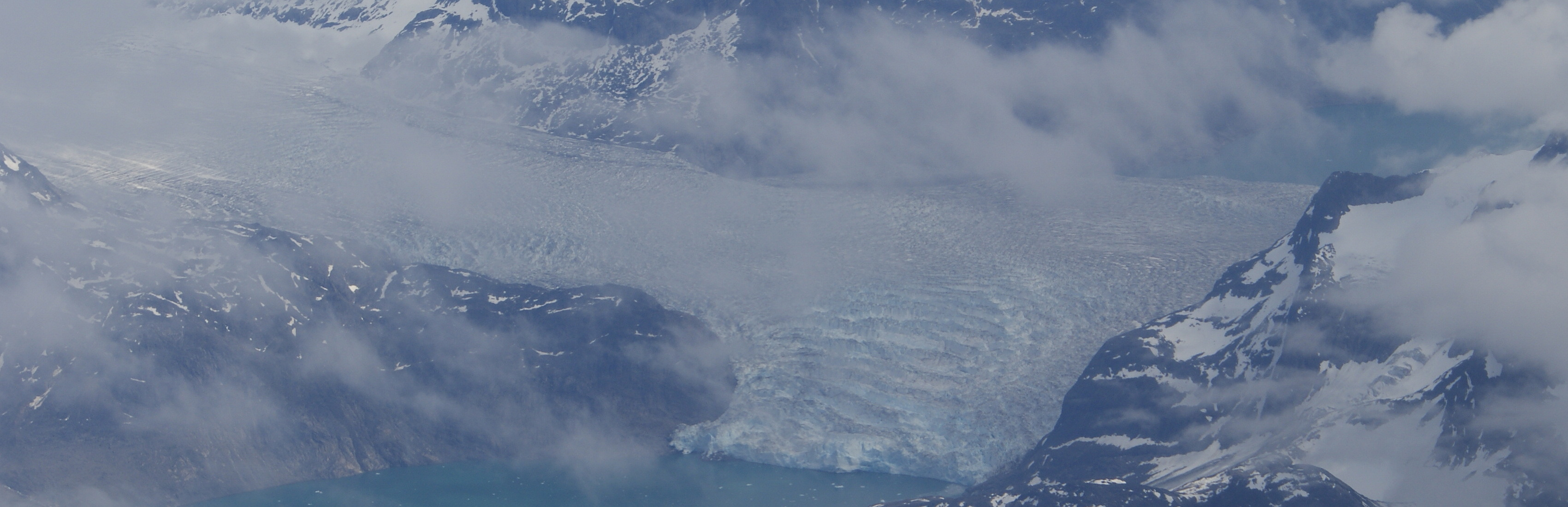
- Aerial view of Sermitsiaq Glacier

- Location within Greenland
- Type: Tidewater glacier
- Location: Greenland
- Coordinates: 66°0′N 52°50′W
- Terminus: Davis Strait through Kangaamiut Kangerluarsuat Fjord and Kangerlussuatsiaq Fjord

Sermitsiaq Glacier is a tidewater glacier in the Qeqqata municipality in western Greenland. It drains Maniitsoq ice cap into two fjords flowing towards Davis Strait: Kangaamiut Kangerluarsuat Fjord in the north, and the longer Kangerlussuatsiaq Fjord in the south.

== See also ==
- List of glaciers in Greenland
