= Blosseville Coast =

Blosseville Coast Blosseville Kyst
- Coastal region
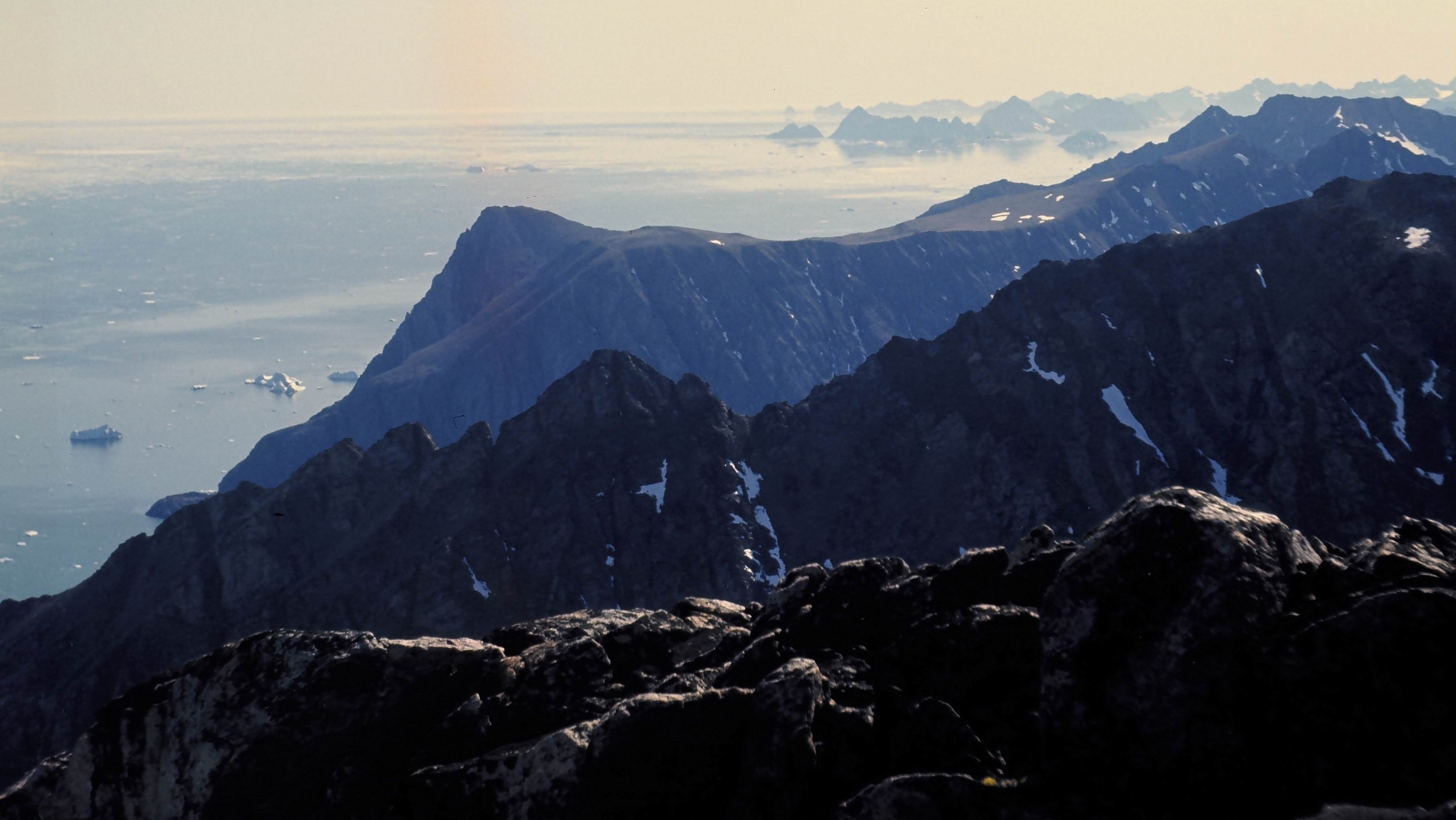
- View of the Blosseville Coast

- Location of the Blosseville Coast
- Country: Greenland
- Municipality: Sermersooq

The Blosseville Coast (Danish: Blosseville Kyst) is a long stretch of coastline in King Christian IX Land, eastern Greenland. Administratively it belongs to the Sermersooq Municipality.

The Blosseville Coast is steep and difficult to access by ship owing to the great number of ice floes, frequent fog, dangerous currents and lack of good anchorages.

== History ==
This stretch of coast is named after French Lieutenant Jules de Blosseville, commander of "La Lilloise". In 1833 Lt. Blosseville first sighted the stretch of unexplored coast between the 68th and the 69th parallel north. He decided to survey the coast more thoroughly and sailed first to Iceland to make repairs on his ship. Then he headed back to the area of this coast but was lost without a trace. In the years that followed, three expeditions were organized to find Lt. Blosseville and the 83 other men on the ship but no trace was found.

The coast was finally explored and mapped in 1900 by Georg Carl Amdrup in the course of the Carlsbergfund Expedition to East Greenland.

== Geography ==
The Blosseville Coast is located between Kangerlussuaq Fjord in the SW and Cape Brewster at the entrance to Scoresby Sound to the NE. Amdrup initially had used the name for a stretch of coast between Barclay Bay and Cape Vedel.

Compared to other coastal areas in Greenland the coast in this area is not deeply indented. Fjords, such as Nansen Fjord and Kivioq Fjord, are relatively short. In some fjords the Greenland ice sheet comes down to the shore. There are only a few islands lying off the coast and they are generally small.

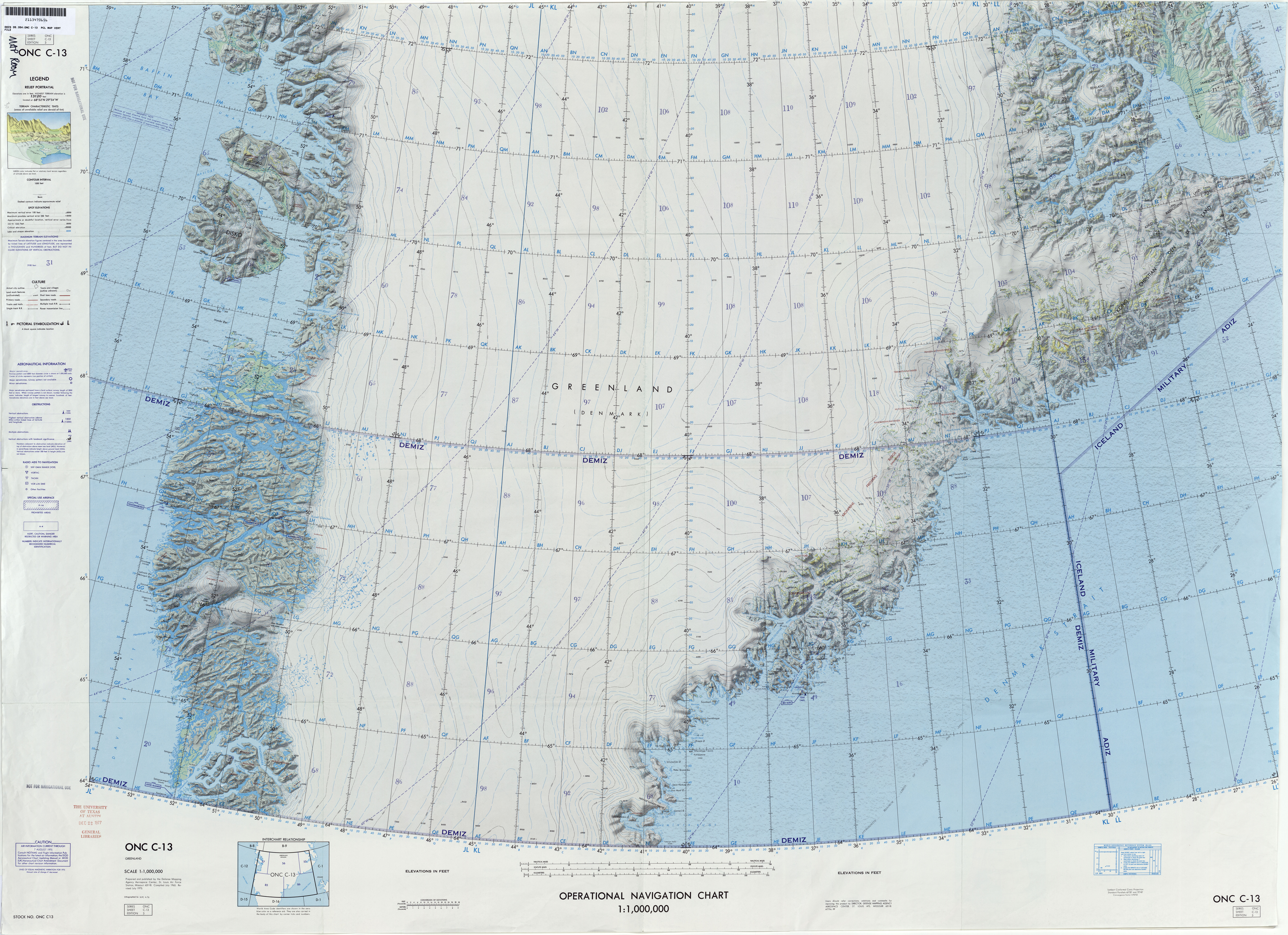
Map of Greenland section with the Blosseville Coast in the upper right.

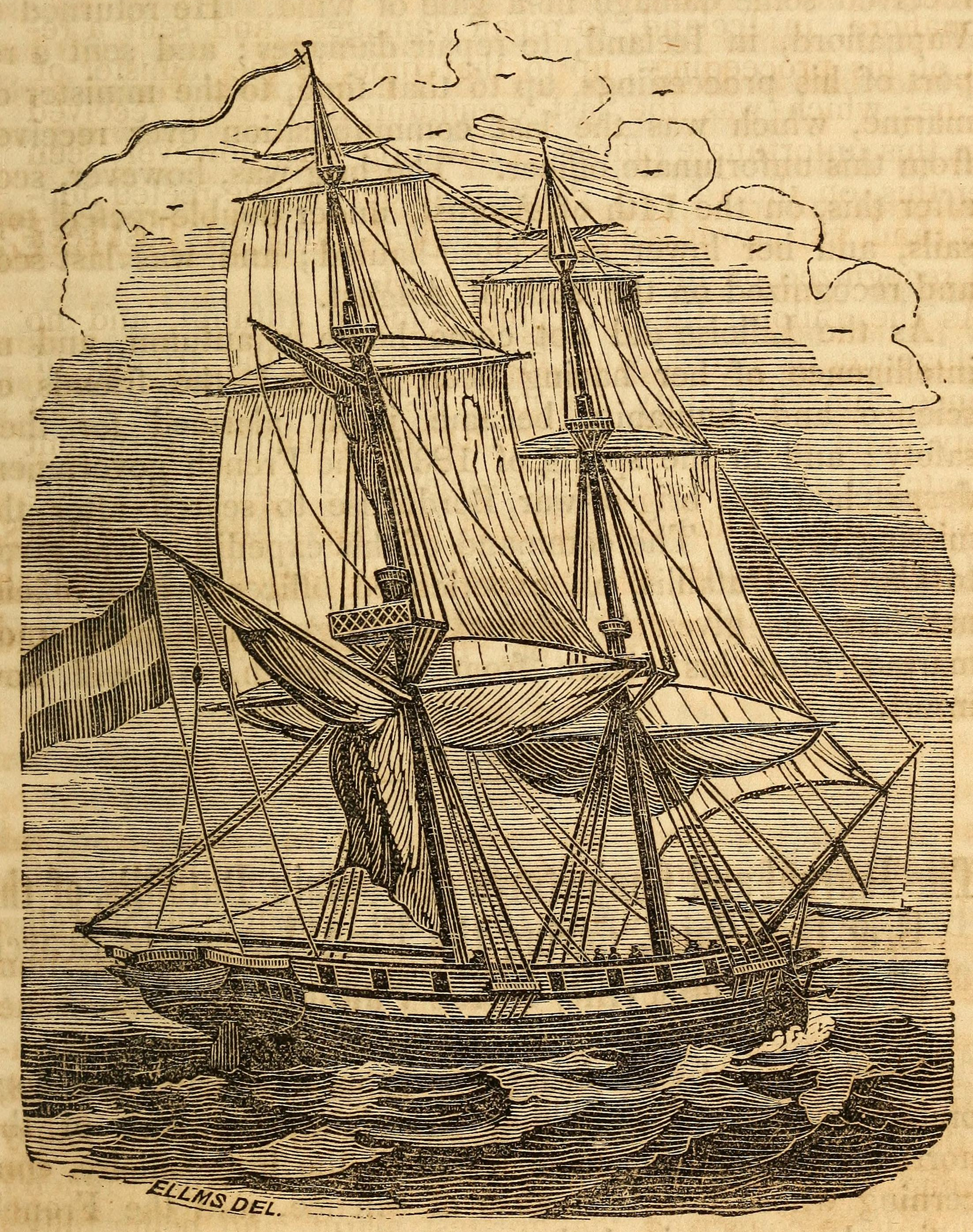
Ill-fated Brig La Lilloise, after whose commander the coast was named.
