= Kangerlussuatsiaq Fjord =

Fjord in Greenland

- Evighedsfjorden
- Location in Greenland
- Location: Arctic (West Greenland)
- Coordinates: 65°53′N 52°20′W
- Ocean/sea sources: Davis Strait
- Basin countries: Greenland
- Max. length: 75 km (46.6 mi)
- Average depth: 700 m (2,300 ft)

Kangerlussuatsiaq Fjord (old spelling: Kangerdlugssuatsiaq, Danish: Evighedsfjorden) is a fjord in the Qeqqata municipality in western Greenland. Taking its source in the tidewater glaciers draining the Maniitsoq ice cap, the fjord flows in a deep canyon through a mountainous, uninhabited region, emptying into Davis Strait near the settlement of Kangaamiut.

== Geography ==
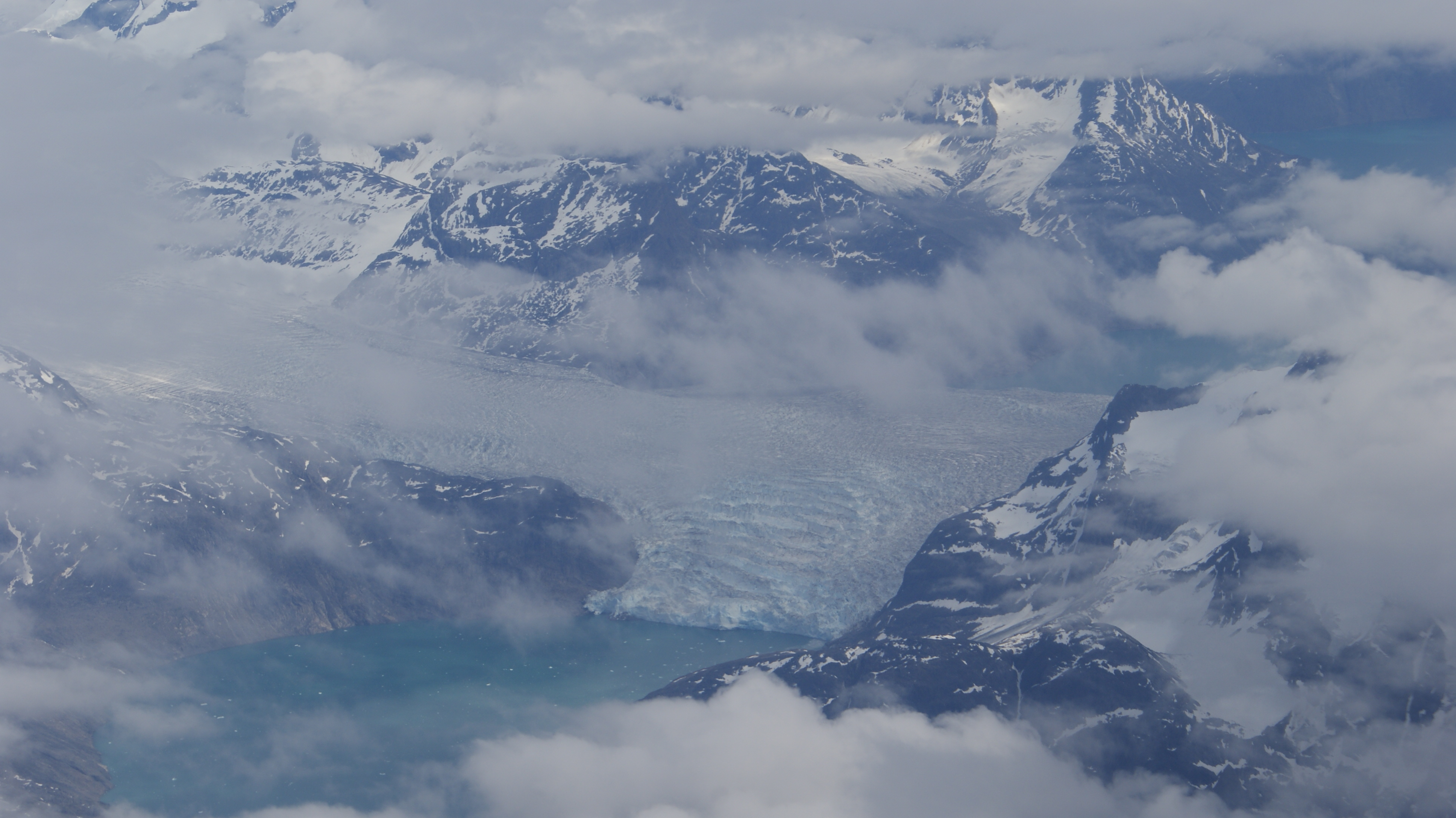
Aerial view of Sermitsiaq Glacier flowing into two fjords at the same time: Kangaamiut Kangerluarsuat in the north (left) and Kangerlussuatsiaq in the south (right).

Kangerlussuatsiaq Fjord is 75 km (46.6 mi) long and 700 m (2,300 ft) deep. The head of the fjord is formed by two tributaries. Qingua Kujalleq, the southern arm, is a short icefjord flowing northwestward, with its head at 65°55′07″N 51°41′57″W. Qingua Avannarleq, the northern arm, flowing southwestward from the Kangerlussuatsiaup Qingua valley, blocked at the end by glacier outflow from the Maniitsoq ice cap, now separated from the Greenland ice sheet (Greenlandic: Sermersuaq), at 66°05′00″N 51°42′35″W.

After the confluence the fjord heads to the southwest, bounded from both sides by mountain cliffs exceeding 2,000 metres (6,600 ft). The mountains near the middle part of the fjord is considered the best heliskiing and mountaineering region in Greenland.

The canyon of the fjord turns 90 degrees to the northwest at 65°52′30″N 52°19′30″W, and then again southwestward, at the confluence with small icefjords flowing from glaciers draining Maniitsoq ice cap at 65°56′30″N 52°39′00″W. The largest glacier in that area is Sermitsiaq Glacier, falling into two separate fjords: Kangerlussuatsiaq Fjord in the south and Kangaamiut Kangerluarsuat Fjord in the north.

After that point the fjord widens, while the mountain cliffs are half as high as in the central section. The fjord opens into Davis Strait, with its mouth dotted with several skerries.

== Settlement ==
The forbidding nature of the fjord surroundings preclude settlement for the majority of its length. Kangaamiut is the only settlement in the vicinity, located on a small island at the northern end of the fjord mouth.

== Hydropower ==
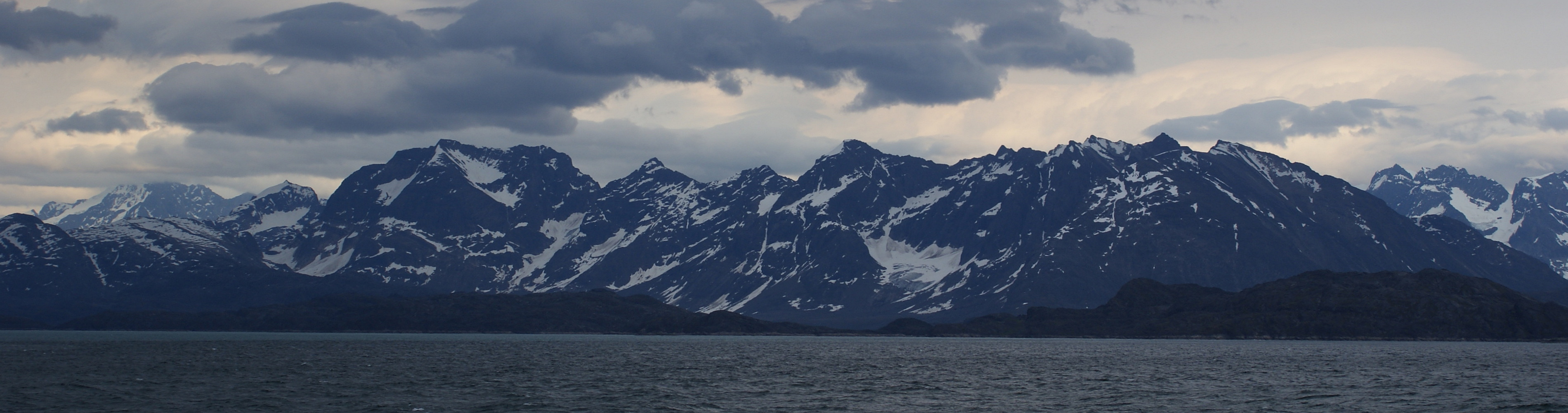
The mouth of Kangerlussuatsiaq fjord

There are advanced plans for the Alcoa aluminium smelting plant in the Qeqqata municipality. Maniitsoq, the second-largest town in the municipality, is one of the proposed locations, alongside the municipal center in Sisimiut. The plant would provide employment for 600–700 people, or more than 10 percent of the population. As it is a vital decision for the town, wide public consultations were carried out in 2008–2010 by both the town authorities and the Government of Greenland in order to address potential environmental and social concerns.

A hydroelectric power plant at the source of the Majorqaq river would yield an estimated energy output of 1,000 GWh per year. Combined with the second plant near Kangerlussuatsiaq Fjord with 3,170 GWh per year, the energy would be sufficient to power the aluminium plant near Maniitsoq. The ultimate decision as to the location of the plant has not yet been taken.

== See also ==
- List of fjords of Greenland
