= Kivioq Fjord =

Fjord in Greenland

- Location in Greenland
- Location: Arctic
- Coordinates: 68°22′N 29°6′W
- Ocean/sea sources: Denmark Strait
- Basin countries: Greenland
- Max. length: 12 kilometres (7.5 mi)
- Max. width: 3.5 kilometres (2.2 mi)
- Settlements: 0

Kivioq Fjord (Danish: Kivioqs Fjord) is a fjord in King Christian IX Land, Eastern Greenland. It is part of the Sermersooq municipality.

== Geography ==
This fjord lies in the Blosseville Coast east of Nansen Fjord. Its mouth lies between Cape Garde to the west and Cape Normann to the east. The fjord is oriented in a NW/SE direction. It has a glacier at its head and another discharging in its eastern shore.

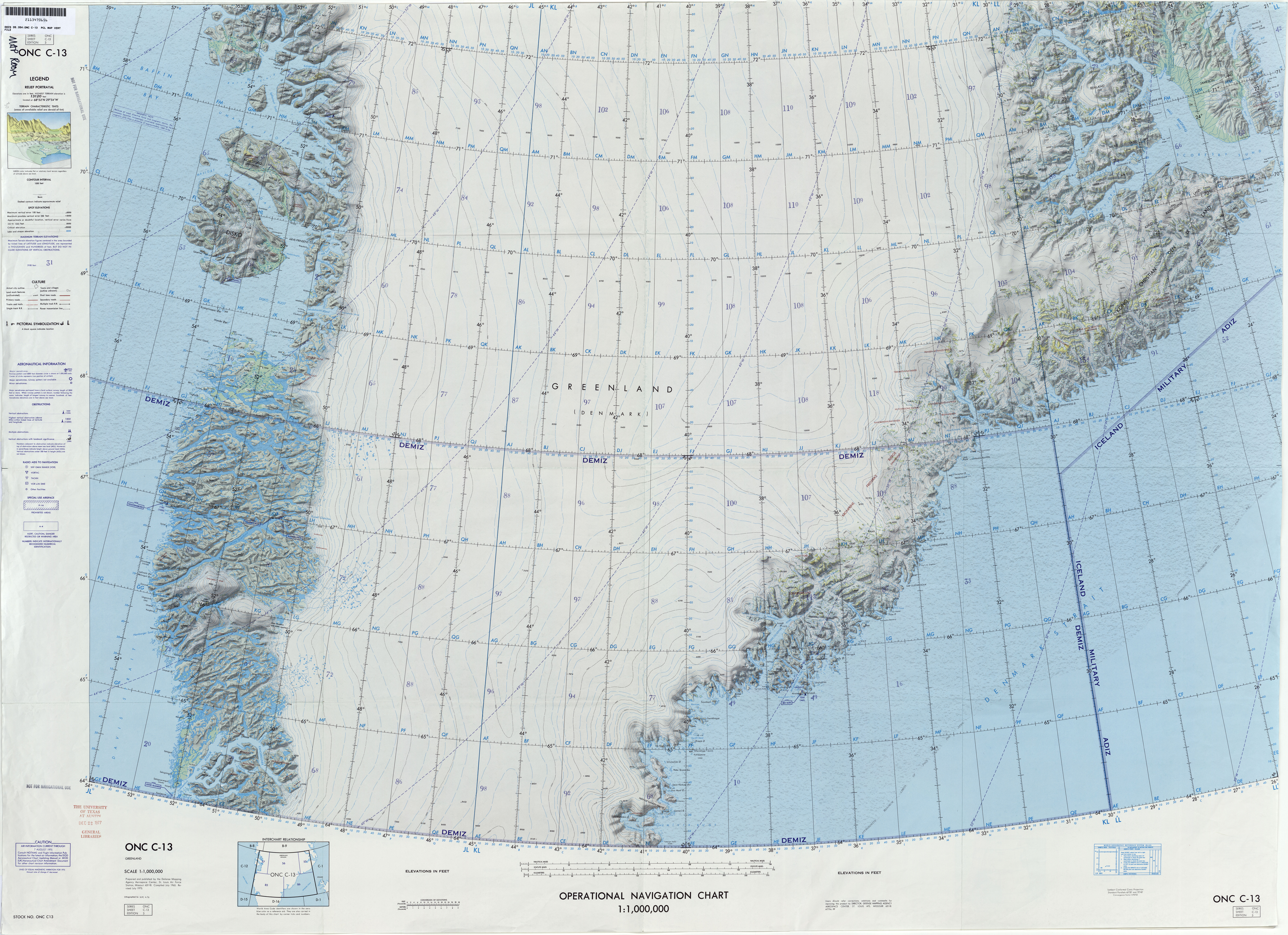
Map of Greenland section

== See also ==
- List of fjords of Greenland
