= Napasorsuaq Fjord =

Fjord in Greenland

- Kangerdlugsuatsiak
- Napasorsuup Kangerlua (Danish)
- Location in Greenland
- Location: Arctic (SE Greenland)
- Coordinates: 61°43′N 42°35′W
- Ocean/sea sources: North Atlantic Ocean
- Basin countries: Greenland
- Max. length: 40 km (25 mi)
- Max. width: 4.5 km (2.8 mi)

Napasorsuaq Fjord or Napasorsuup Kangerlua (also known as 'Napassorssuaq Fjord' and 'Kangerdlugsuatsiak') is a fjord of the King Frederick VI Coast in the Sermersooq municipality, southeastern Greenland.

== Geography ==
Napasorsuaq Fjord

Napasorsuaq Fjord's mouth is located between Puisortup Kangerlua to the north and Anorituup Kangerlua to the south. It extends in a roughly east–west direction for about 20 km, bending in a NW/SE direction for a further 15 km, then it bends again in a NE/SW direction for a further 7 km. To the east the fjord opens into the North Atlantic Ocean. At its head there are three large glaciers. The southern end of its mouth is at a point 16 km (9.9 mi) north of the island of Qulleq.

The northern side of the entrance of the fjord is Cape Daniel Rantzau, the SE headland of an irregularly-shaped coastal island located on the northern side of the mouth of the fjord —on the same island on which the Cape Cort Adelaer weather station stood. The island is separated from the mainland coast by the Tunua sound.

=== Mountains ===
There are high mountains rising on both sides of the fjord towards the inner side. A peak at the head of the fjord rises steeply to a height of 1,473 m (4,833 ft) on the southern side above the glacier at 61°47′43″N 42°56′11″W. Further inland there is a massive 1,600-metre-high (5,200 ft) mountain located at 61°48′25″N 43°4′38″W and 5 km further to the west a 1,800 m (5,900 ft) glacier-topped mountain at 61°47′52″N 43°10′22″W.

== See also ==
- List of fjords of Greenland
