= Igtip Kangertiva =

Fjord in Greenland

- Comanche Bay
- Location in Greenland
- Location: Arctic
- Coordinates: 65°2′N 40°18′W
- Ocean/sea sources: Denmark Strait
- Basin countries: Greenland
- Max. length: 12.8 kilometres (8.0 mi)
- Max. width: 2 kilometres (1.2 mi)

Igtip Kangertiva, also known as Comanche Bay (Danish: Comanche Bugt), is a fjord in Eastern Greenland. It is part of the Sermersooq municipality.

== History ==
During World War II a weather station of the US Army Air Corps and the US Coast Guard was established in Comanche Bay. The decision was taken in the spring of 1942 and the USCGC Comanche (WPG-76), a ship of the Greenland Patrol, was sent to survey the fjord. The USCGC Comanche reached the site in July and the bay was subsequently named after it.

Besides the weather facility the US military wanted a base from which the warplanes of Operation Bolero that were forced to land on the Greenland ice sheet could be rescued. Owing to its closeness to the inland ice, Comanche Bay was deemed a favorable place from which to send rescue patrols. However, when shortly thereafter a Boeing B-17 Flying Fortress crash-landed on the ice sheet not far from Comanche Bay, a rescue operation ran into difficulties because of treacherous crevasses near the crash site and two men were lost. Following this accident the base was closed in the fall of the same year.

On account of war-related priorities the Comanche Bay base was reestablished in 1943 by Major John T. Crowell, along with a facility at Cape Cort Adelaer further south down the coast. The weather station was located on top of a 351 metres (1,152 ft) high hill that was named Atterbury Dome, after the captain of the USCGC Comanche. The coastal stations were abandoned at the end of the war.

== Geography ==
Igtip Kangertiva or Comanche Bay lies at the southwestern limit of King Christian IX Land, a few miles east of Pikiulleq. Its mouth lies between Ole Romer Island to the west and Aqitseq to the east. The fjord is oriented in a roughly NNW/SSE direction. There are a number of low islets in its western shore close to its mouth.

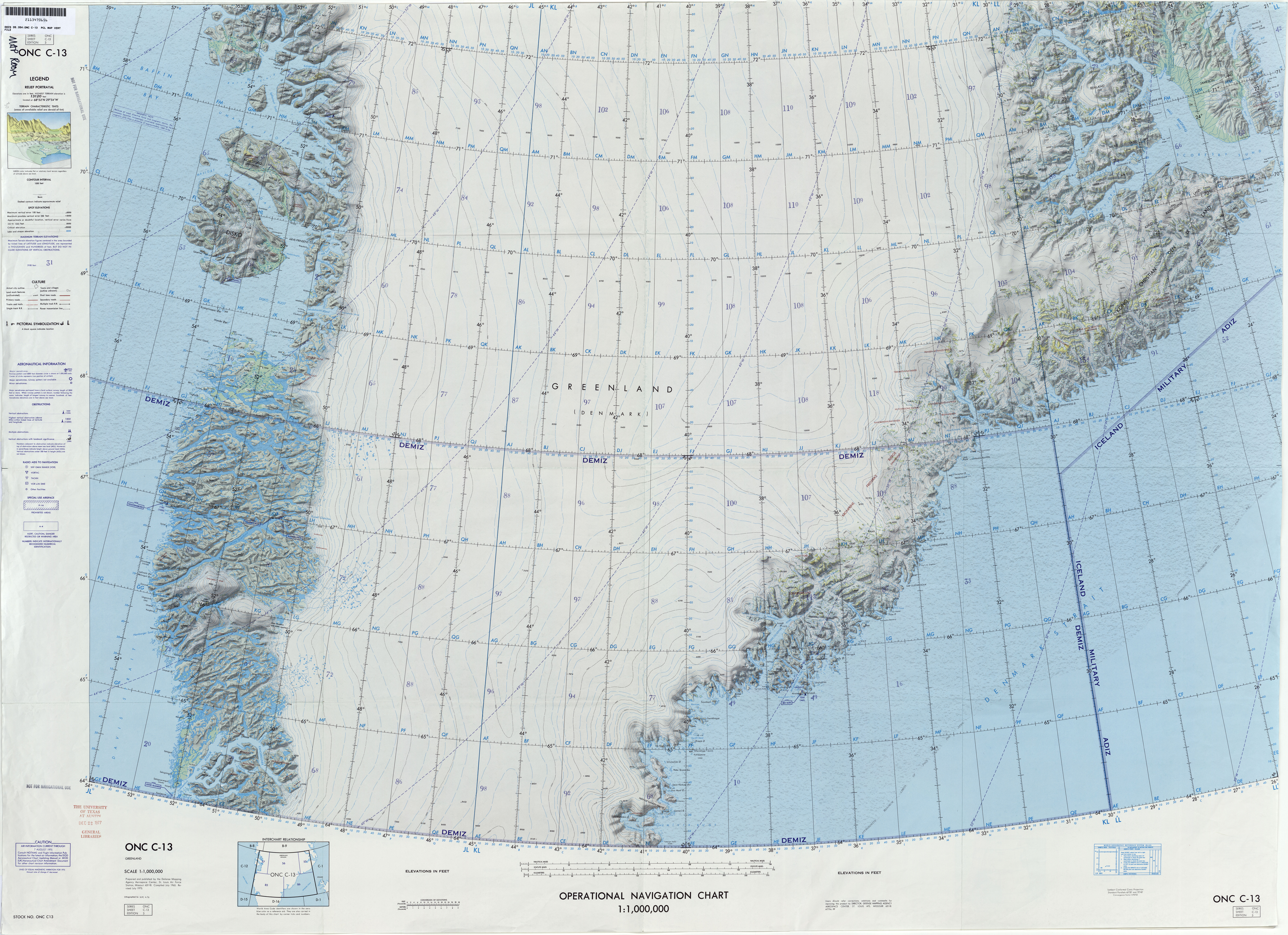
Map of Greenland section

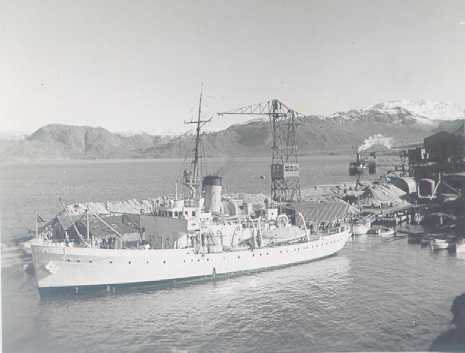
The USCGC Comanche, after which the fjord was named, anchored at Ivittuut

== See also ==
- List of fjords of Greenland
- My Gal Sal (aircraft)

== Bibliography ==
- Wallace R. Hansen. Greenland's Icy Fury. Williams-Ford Texas A&M University Military History Series. 1994 ISBN 978-0890965795.
