= Kangaamiut =

Kangaamiut Gammel Sukkertoppen
- Town
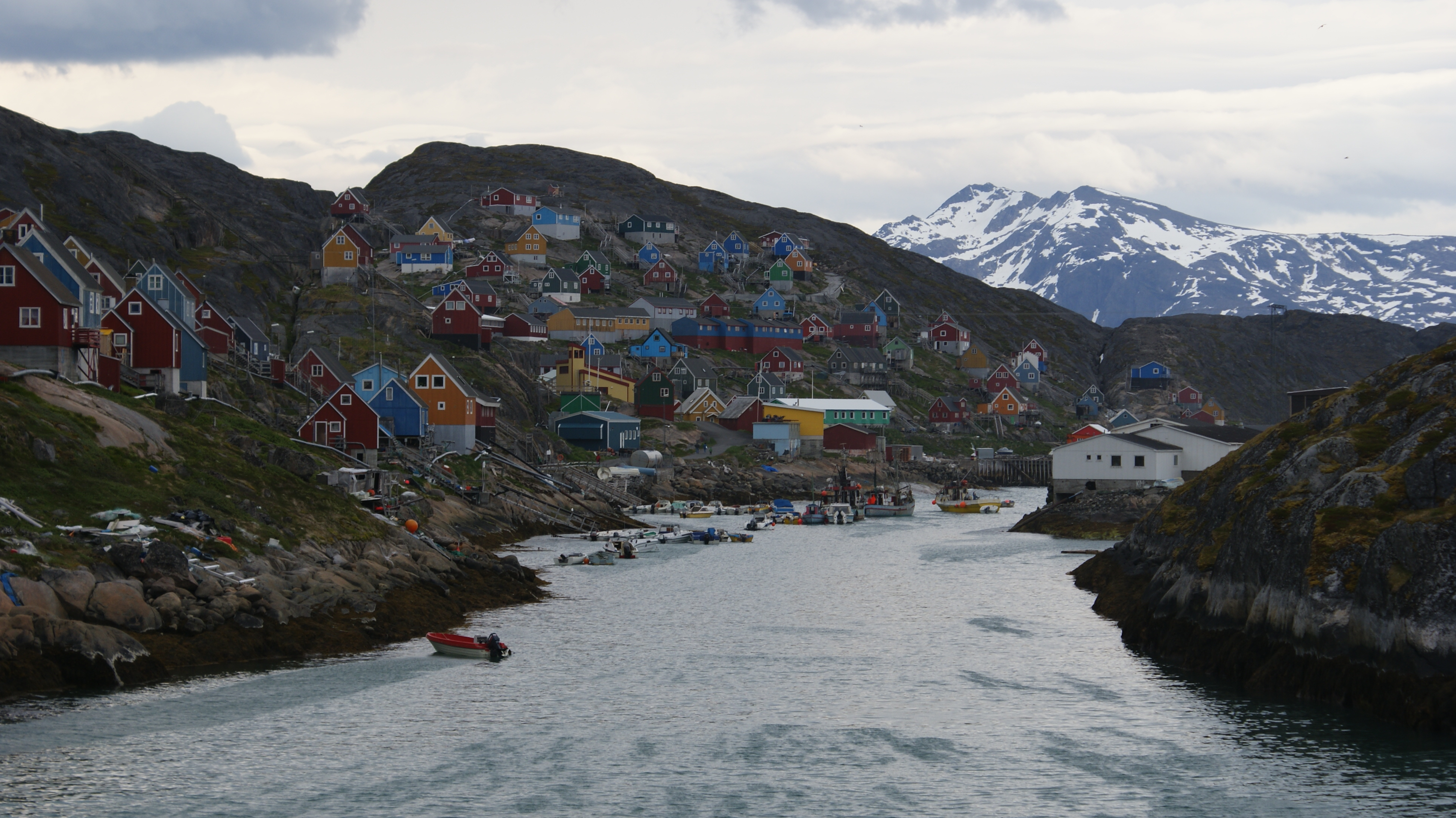
- Kangaamiut

- Location within Greenland Kangaamiut (North America)
- Coordinates: 65°49′30″N 53°20′15″W
- State: Kingdom of Denmark
- Constituent country: Greenland
- Municipality: Qeqqata
- Founded: 1755

Government
  - Mayor: Judithe Fredriksen

Population (2020)
  - Total: 293
- Time zone: UTC−02:00 (Western Greenland Time)
  - Summer (DST): UTC−01:00 (Western Greenland Summer Time)
- Postal code: 3912 Maniitsoq

Kangaamiut, formerly known as Gammel Sukkertoppen, is a settlement with a population of 293 (2020) in the Qeqqata municipality in central-western Greenland.

== Geography ==
Kangaamiut is located on an island off the coast of Davis Strait between mouths of two long fjords. To the south is the long and twisted Kangerlussuatsiaq Fjord and to the north is the Kangaamiut Kangerluarsuat Fjord. The mouth of the long Kangerlussuaq Fjord is located approximately 26 kilometers (16 mi) north of the island.

== History ==
The Dano-Norwegian settlement Sukkertoppen was originally located at the site of present-day Kangaamiut, when it was founded in 1755. It was moved to its present location at Maniitsoq in 1782.

== Transport ==
Kangaamiut serves as a port of call for the Arctic Umiaq Line coastal ship.

== Population ==
Kangaamiut has experienced a sharp decline in its population. The settlement has lost more than 36% of its population relative to 1990 and more than 26% relative to 2000.

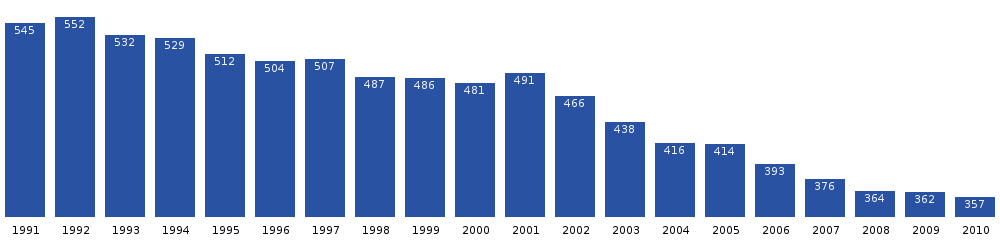
Kangaamiut population growth dynamics, 1991-2010. Source: Statistics Greenland
