= Ikersuaq =

Fjord in Greenland

- Bredefjord
- Location in Greenland
- Location: Arctic
- Coordinates: 61°0′N 46°21′W
- Ocean/sea sources: Labrador Sea
- Basin countries: Greenland
- Max. length: 87 km (54 mi)
- Max. width: 5.4 km (3.4 mi)

Ikersuaq, old spelling Ikerssuak, (Danish: Bredefjord) is a fjord in southwestern Greenland. Administratively it is part of the Kujalleq municipality.

== Geography ==
The Ikersuaq fjord is oriented in a roughly NE/SW direction and to the southwest its mouth opens into the Julianehab Bay, Labrador Sea, North Atlantic Ocean. There is a vast ice field on the northwestern side of the fjord, where there are three branches, Qaleragdlit Imâ, Kangerlua and Kangerluarsuk.

The Northern Sermilik (Nordre Sermilik) fjord is the inner section of Ikersuaq fjord. On its southern side the 1,440 m high Ilimaussaq peak rises in the peninsula to the east of the fjord. Northern Sermilik has two branches in the north with large glaciers at their heads.

Elongated Tuttutooq Island is a prolongation of the southwestern end of the peninsula forming the southern shore of Northern Sermilik. The Narsaq Sound separates the peninsula from the island on the southern shore, connecting with neighbouring Tunulliarfik and Skovfjord.

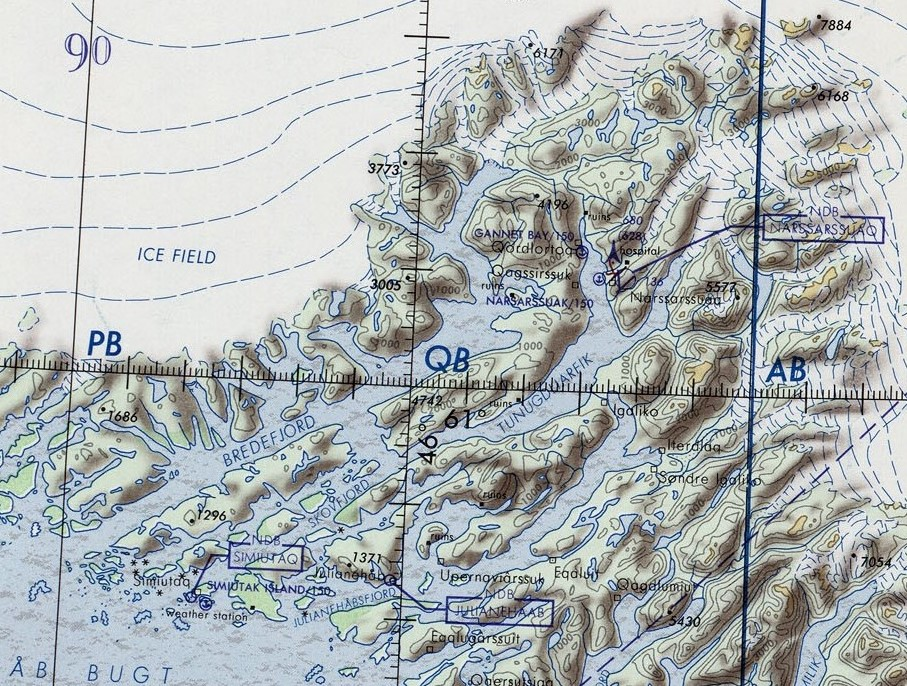
Map of Greenland section showing Ikersuaq (Bredefjord)

== Bibliography ==
- Ivar Haug (2005). Gazetteer of Greenland UBiT (Trondheim University Library), ISBN 82-7113-114-1

== See also ==
- List of fjords of Greenland
