= Sullua Fjord =

Fjord in Greenland

- Location in Greenland
- Location: Arctic
- Coordinates: 72°14′N 55°08′W
- Ocean/sea sources: Baffin Bay
- Basin countries: Greenland
- Max. length: 40 km (25 mi)
- Max. width: 3.5 km (2.2 mi)

Sullua Fjord is a fjord of Greenland. It is located in the Upernavik Archipelago.

== Geography ==
The fjord is oriented in a roughly NE/SW direction, to the southwest the fjord opens into the Baffin Bay of the North Atlantic Ocean. To the west lies the Innerit and to the east the Sigguup Nunaa Peninsula.

== See also ==
- List of fjords of Greenland
