= Ukkusissat (mountain) =

Mountain in Greenland

Ukkusissaq / Ukkusissat
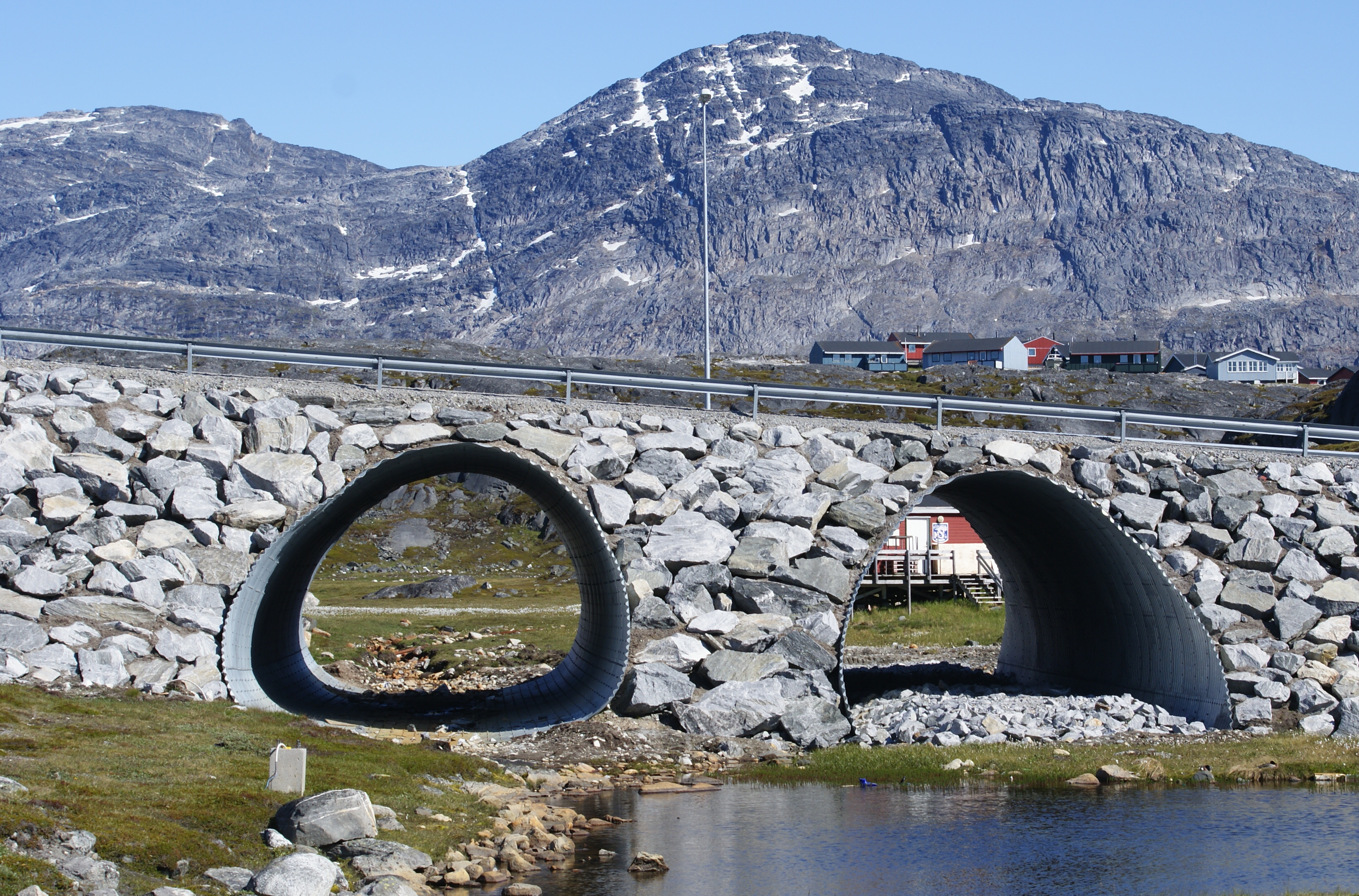
- Ukkusissaq seen from the Nuussuaq district of Nuuk

Highest point
- Elevation: 772 m (2,533 ft)
- Coordinates: 64°09′51″N 51°38′22″W

Geography
- Location within Greenland
- Location: Mainland of Greenland

Ukkusissaq or Ukkusissat (old spelling: Uvkusigssak´ or Uvkusigssat, Danish: Store Malene) is a 772 m (2,533 ft) tall mountain in the Sermersooq municipality in southwestern Greenland, located to the southeast of Nuuk Airport, an airport in Nuuk, the capital of Greenland. It is the terminus of a long mountain range of a peninsula jutting into Nuup Kangerlua, the longest fjord in southwestern Greenland, to the north of Kangerluarsunnguaq Fjord splitting the peninsula into two.
