= Kangerluluk Range =

Mountain range in Greenland

- Kangerluluk Bjerge
- Location within Greenland

Highest point
- Peak: Unnamed
- Elevation: 2,020 m (6,630 ft)

Geography
- Country: Greenland
- Range coordinates: 61°8′N 42°55′W

The Kangerluluk Range (Danish: Kangerluluk Bjerge) is a mountain range in the King Frederick VI Coast, southeastern Greenland. Administratively this range is part of the Kujalleq municipality.

This mountain group was named after Kangerluluk, the fjord flanking the range on the southern side. The area of the range is uninhabited.

== Geography ==
The Kangerluluk Mountains are craggy and steep nunataks, relatively little glaciated in the eastern side and progressively rising less and less above the glaciers further inland until being engulfed by the Greenland ice sheet. The range runs roughly from east to west from Cape Olfert Fischer in the Irminger Sea coast, between Kangerluluk fjord in the south and Igutsaat Fjord in the north.

=== Peaks ===
Already 15 km within the fjord there is a 1,291 m (4,236 ft) high peak rising above the waters on the northern side of Kangerluluk. The highest elevation of the range, reaching a height of 2,020 m (6,630 ft), is located at its western end at 61°9′7″N 43°44′51″W.

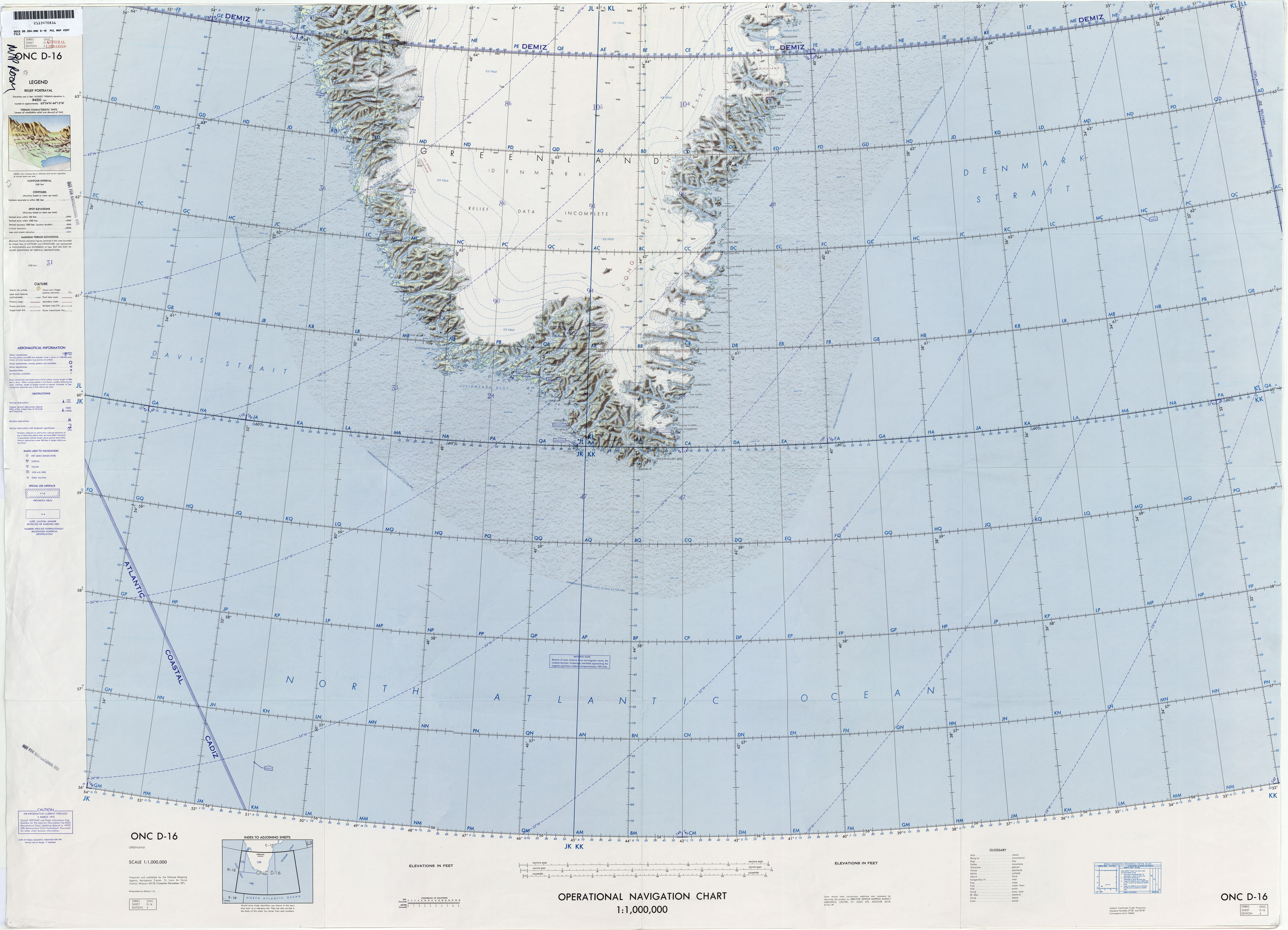
Map of Greenland section.

== See also ==
- List of mountain ranges of Greenland
- List of Nunataks§Greenland
