= Avaqqat Kangerluat =

Fjord in southern Greenland

- Location in Greenland
- Location: Arctic (SE Greenland)
- Coordinates: 61°17′N 42°48′W
- Ocean/sea sources: North Atlantic Ocean
- Basin countries: Greenland
- Max. length: 45 km (28 mi)
- Max. width: 5 km (3.1 mi)

Avaqqat Kangerluat, also known as Avarqqat Kangerluat, Avaqqat Kangerlua and Puiagtoq Fjord, is a fjord in the King Frederick VI Coast, Kujalleq municipality, southern Greenland.

== History ==
This fjord was referred to as "Auarket" by Lieutenant Wilhelm August Graah in 1829 during his East Coast expedition. He camped at Taateraat Nuuat ("Taterat"), a place by the entrance of the fjord to the south. He found that a family of Southeast-Greenland Inuit was living in the area o the fjord. Graah described these Inuit as good-looking. Graah was told about a strange object of iron in the area and he found that it was an old, rusty cannon. Graah cleaned it and fired it for the amusement of the Greenlanders.

== Geography ==
Avaqqat Kangerluat

Avaqqat Kangerluat extends in a roughly ESE/WNW direction for about 45 km between Anorituup Kangerlua to the north and Igutsaat Fjord to the south. To the east the fjord opens into the North Atlantic Ocean between Taterat and Karrat Point. The fjord becomes wide in its middle part and has large active glacier at its head and on its sides.

Puiattoq is a tributary fjord with an active glacier on Avaqqat Kangerluat's southern shore and Qassialik, another offshoot, extends 7 km WSW close to the mouth on the southern shore but has no glacier at its head. Southeast of the mouth along the coast there is a small bay named Qasigiaqartarfia. Uummannaarsuk is a 239-metre-high (784 ft) island located about 4 km from Avaqqat, the point on the northern side of the fjord's mouth.

The Avaqqat Paleo-Eskimo archaeological site is located at the entrance of the fjord on its northern side.

=== Mountains ===
There are high mountains rising on both sides of the fjord, but not as steeply as in other fjords of the same area of the coast. A peak at the head of the fjord rises to a height of 1,490 m (4,890 ft) on the northern side between two confluent glaciers and a 1,581-metre-high (5,187 ft) peak rises further to the west at 61°21′55″N 43°24′44″W.

== Bibliography ==
- John Grocott, Vertical Coupling and Decoupling in the Lithosphere, Geological Society, pp 233–37

== See also ==
- List of fjords of Greenland
