= Kangerluluk =

Fjord in Greenland

- Location in Greenland
- Interactive map of Kangerluluk
- Location: Arctic (SE Greenland)
- Coordinates: 61°6′N 43°5′W
- Ocean/sea sources: North Atlantic Ocean
- Basin countries: Greenland
- Max. length: 65 km (40 mi)
- Max. width: 3 km (1.9 mi)

Kangerluluk, meaning 'the awful fjord', is a fjord in the King Frederick VI Coast, Kujalleq municipality, southern Greenland.

Deposits of rare minerals have been found in this fjord, as well as in neighbouring Igutsaat Fjord.

== Geography ==
Kangerluluk extends in a roughly east–west direction for about 65 km between Igutsaat Fjord to the north and Iluileq Fjord (Danell Fjord) to the south. To the east the fjord opens into the North Atlantic Ocean between Cape Olfert Fischer and the headland of Qajartalik, just north of Qeqertatsiaq Island. The fjord has a large active glacier at its head and is frequently blocked by ice.

Kangerluluk has four short branches on its southern coast. On the northern shore the Syenitbugt is a bay with an islet, located about 11 km from the fjord's mouth.

=== Mountains ===
There are high mountains on the sides of the fjord, a craggy group known as the Kangerluluk Range (Kangerluluk Bjerge) rises to a height of 1,291 m (4,236 ft) on the northern side about 15 km within the fjord and continues westwards culminating in a massive ultra-prominent peak at 61°9′7″N 43°44′51″W towering to a height of 2,020 m (6,630 ft) above the glaciers at the head of the fjord. The Graah Mountains (Graah Fjelde) rise to the south of the fjord and are relatively free from snow.

== Bibliography ==
- Henrik Stendal, Robert Frei, Mike A. Hamilton, Wulf U. Mueller, The Palaeoproterozoic Kangerluluk gold–copper mineralization (southeast Greenland): Pb and Nd isotopic constraints on its timing and genesis in Mineralium Deposita, March 2001, Volume 36, Issue 2, pp 177–188

== See also ==
- List of fjords of Greenland
- Syenite
