= Igutsaat Fjord =

Fjord in Greenland

- Location in Greenland
- Interactive map of Igutsaat Fjord
- Location: Arctic (SE Greenland)
- Coordinates: 61°8′N 42°36′W
- Ocean/sea sources: North Atlantic Ocean
- Basin countries: Greenland
- Max. length: 35 km (22 mi)
- Max. width: 4.3 km (2.7 mi)

Igutsaat Fjord, also known as Igutsait Fjord, is a fjord in the King Frederick VI Coast, Kujalleq municipality, southern Greenland.

Deposits of rare minerals have been found in this fjord, as well as in neighbouring Kangerluluk.

== Geography ==
Igutsaat Fjord extends in a roughly east–west direction for about 35 km between Avaqqat Kangerluat to the north and Kangerluluk Fjord to the south. It is very similar in structure to neighboring Kangerluluk but shorter. To the east the fjord opens into the North Atlantic Ocean between Cape Olfert Fischer in the south and Cape Herluf Trolle in the north. The fjord becomes wide in its middle part and has a large active glacier at its head and on its sides.

Uummannaarsuk —not to be confused with Uummannaarsuk off the mouth of Avaqqat Kangerluat 15 km further north— is a small island located about 2.8 km to the NE of Cape Olfert Fischer, the point on the southern side of the fjord's mouth.

The Igutsaat Paleo-Eskimo archaeological site is located by the shore at the entrance of the fjord on its northern side.

=== Mountains ===
There are high mountains rising on both sides of the fjord, the Kangerluluk Range (Kangerluluk Bjerge) stretching along the southern side from east to west reaching heights of 1,291 m (4,236 ft) above the terminus of the glacier —its higher summits rising further to the west. The range flanking the fjord on the northern side has a peak reaching a height of 1,728.8 m (5,672 ft) rising further inland above the glacier at its head at 61°15′20″N 43°26′9″W.

== Bibliography ==
- John Grocott, Vertical Coupling and Decoupling in the Lithosphere, Geological Society, pp 238

== See also ==
- List of fjords of Greenland
