= Nordre Isortoq Fjord =

Fjord in western Greenland

- Location in Greenland
- Location: Arctic (W Greenland)
- Coordinates: 67°16′N 53°10′W
- Ocean/sea sources: Davis Strait
- Basin countries: Greenland

Nordre Isortoq Fjord is a fjord in the Qeqqata municipality in western Greenland.

== Geography ==
Nordre Isortoq Fjord has its mouth near the Maligiánguit Bay of the Davis Strait. The head of the fjord is fed mainly by the Naqingnerssuaq Qiterdleq stream, running down from the Isunnguata Sermia glacier of the western Greenland ice sheet.

== See also ==
- List of fjords of Greenland
