= Anorituup Kangerlua =

Fjord in King Frederick VI Coast, Greenland

- Location in Greenland
- Location: Arctic (SE Greenland)
- Coordinates: 61°32′N 42°46′W
- Ocean/sea sources: North Atlantic Ocean
- Basin countries: Greenland
- Max. length: 50 km (31 mi)
- Max. width: 4.5 km (2.8 mi)

Anorituup Kangerlua, also known as Anoritoq or Anortek Fjord, is a fjord in King Frederick VI Coast, southern Greenland.

== Geography ==
Anorituup Kangerlua

This fjord marks the border between the Sermersooq municipality to the north and the Kujalleq municipality to the south in the eastern coast of Greenland.

Anorituup Kangerlua extends in a roughly E/W direction for about 50 km between Napasorsuaq Fjord to the north and Avaqqat Kangerluat Fjord to the south. Kangikitsua is a tributary fjord branching on the southern shore within the fjord. To the east Anorituup Kangerlua opens into the North Atlantic Ocean. The Qulleq group of coastal islands lies to the northeast of the northern end of its mouth.

The Akia Peninsula is at the southern end of its mouth and the Anorituup Qeqertag islet cluster at its northern end. Off the southern side of the entrance is Isortoq Bay, with Nuuk Point at its eastern end. There are a number of large glaciers at his head.

=== Mountains ===
A 1,461.5 m (4,795 ft) high ultra-prominent peak rises steeply from the shore on the northern side of the fjord at 61°38′51″N 43°1′3″W; Pyramiden is a 1,410 m (4,630 ft) high rocky pyramidal peak rising a little further north above the glacier entering the confluence at the head of the fjord from the east at 61°38′51″N 43°1′3″W.

== See also ==
- List of fjords of Greenland
