= Majorqaq =

River in Greenland

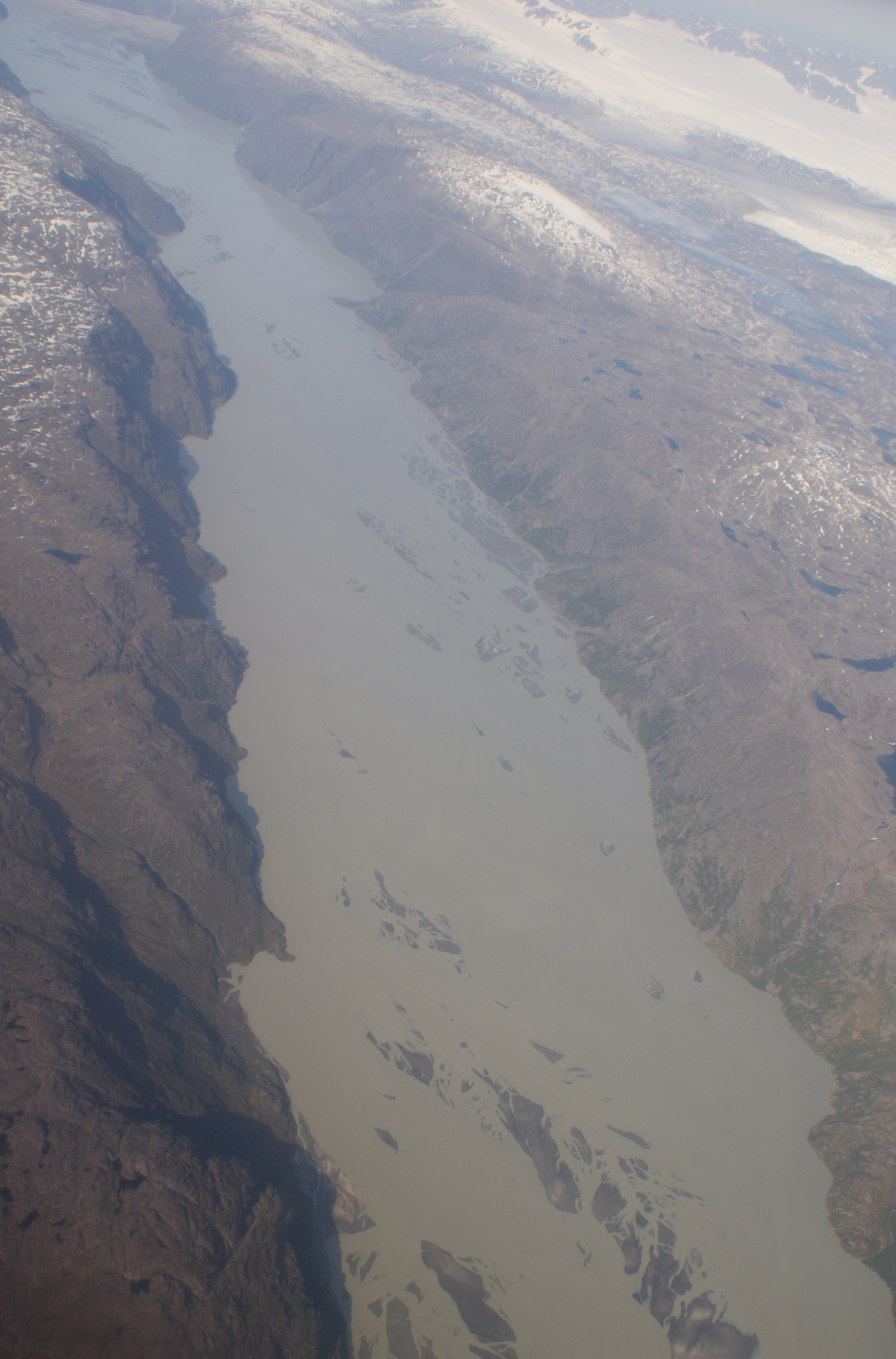
- Aerial view of Majorqaq

Location
- Country: Greenland

Physical characteristics
- Source
  - location: Greenland ice sheet
- Mouth
  - location: Isortoq Fjord
  - elevation: 0 m (0 ft)
- Length: 71 km (44 mi)

Majorqaq is a meltwater river and valley of the same name in the Qeqqata municipality in central-western Greenland. It is one of the widest rivers in western Greenland, draining the Greenland ice sheet.

== Geography ==
Majorqaq is approximately 71 km (44 mi) long. The river source at 65°41′30″N 50°32′00″W is an outflow glacier draining the Greenland ice sheet, in the far inland region of the country. Majorqaq retains approximately the same width for the entire length of the river flow, from its source to its large delta, carrying large quantities of glacial silt. The river flow is variable, with large patches of quicksands across its entire length, particularly near the delta. The river empties into Isortoq Fjord at 65°35′30″N 51°54′00″W.

== Economy ==
=== Hunting ===
While the water from the river is not drinkable due to silt, the highland region around the river is used for game hunting. Due to considerable isolation of the region near the ice sheet, there is a large number of reindeer and muskox in the region.

=== Hydropower ===
Location within Greenland

There are advanced plans for the Alcoa aluminium smelting plant in the Qeqqata municipality. Maniitsoq, the second-largest town in the municipality, is one of the proposed locations, alongside the municipal center in Sisimiut. The plant would provide employment for 600–700 people, or more than 10 percent of the population. As it is a vital decision for the town, wide public consultations were carried out in 2008–2010 by both the town authorities and the Government of Greenland in order to address potential environmental and social concerns.

A hydroelectric power plant at the river source would yield an estimated energy output of 1,000 gigawatt-hours per year. Combined with the second plant near Kangerlussuatsiaq Fjord with 3,170 gigawatt-hours per year, the energy would be sufficient to power the aluminium plant near Maniitsoq. The ultimate decision as to the location of the plant has not yet been taken.

== See also ==
- List of rivers of Greenland
