= Maniitsoq Ice Cap =

Ice cap in Greenland

- Sukkertoppen iskappe
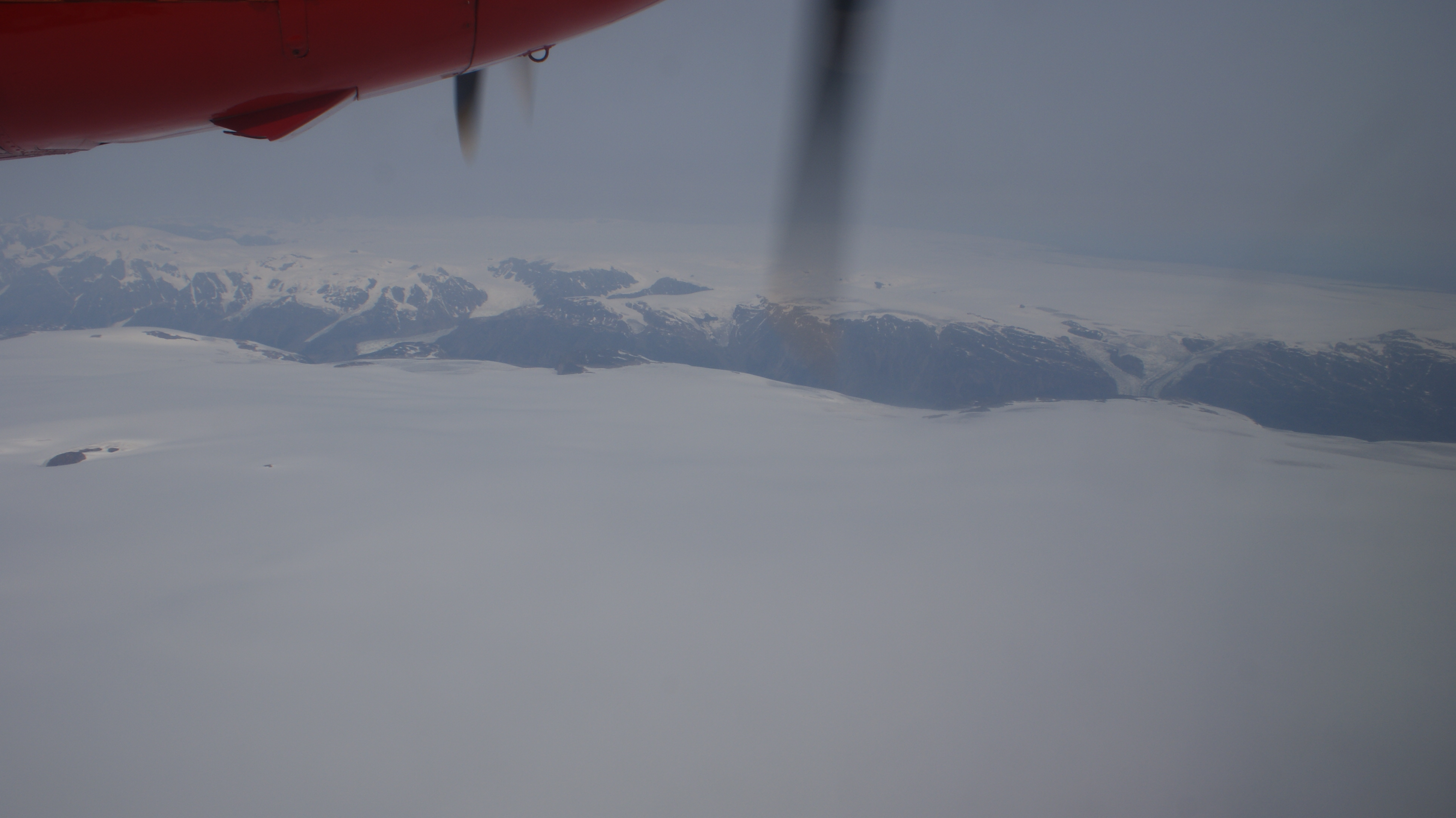
- Aerial view of the ice cap in poor visibility.

- Location within Greenland
- Type: Ice cap
- Location: Greenland
- Coordinates: 66°13′N 52°11′W
- Area: 1,600 km^{2} (620 sq mi)
- Length: 58 kilometres (36 mi)
- Thickness: 400 m (1,300 ft) average
- Terminus: Outlet glaciers
- Status: Retreating

Maniitsoq Ice Cap (old spelling: Manîtsoq, Danish: Sukkertoppen iskappe or Sukkertoppen isflade) is a 58 km × 41 km (36 mi × 25 mi) ice cap in the Qeqqata municipality in western Greenland.

== Geography ==
There are no settlements in the vicinity of the ice cap. In the southeast, Maniitsoq ice cap is separated from the westward tongue of the Greenland ice sheet by the narrow Kangerlussuatsiaup Qingua valley. The summit of the ice cap reaches between 1,300 metres (4,265 ft) and 1,800 metres (5,906 ft). The maximum height is marked as an 8,000 feet (2,438 m) high summit in the Defense Mapping Agency Greenland Navigation charts, although it does not rise above 1,850 metres (6,070 ft).

In the south, several mountain glaciers drain it towards the upper reaches of the Kangerlussuatsiaq Fjord. To the west, the ice cap is drained by the long Sermitsiaq Glacier. To the northwest, numerous mountain glaciers drain it towards Kangerlussuaq Fjord. To the northeast of the ice sheet lies the wide highland of Angujaartorfiup Nunaa, home to herds of muskoxen, originally reintroduced in its northern part from the populations of the Northeast Greenland National Park.

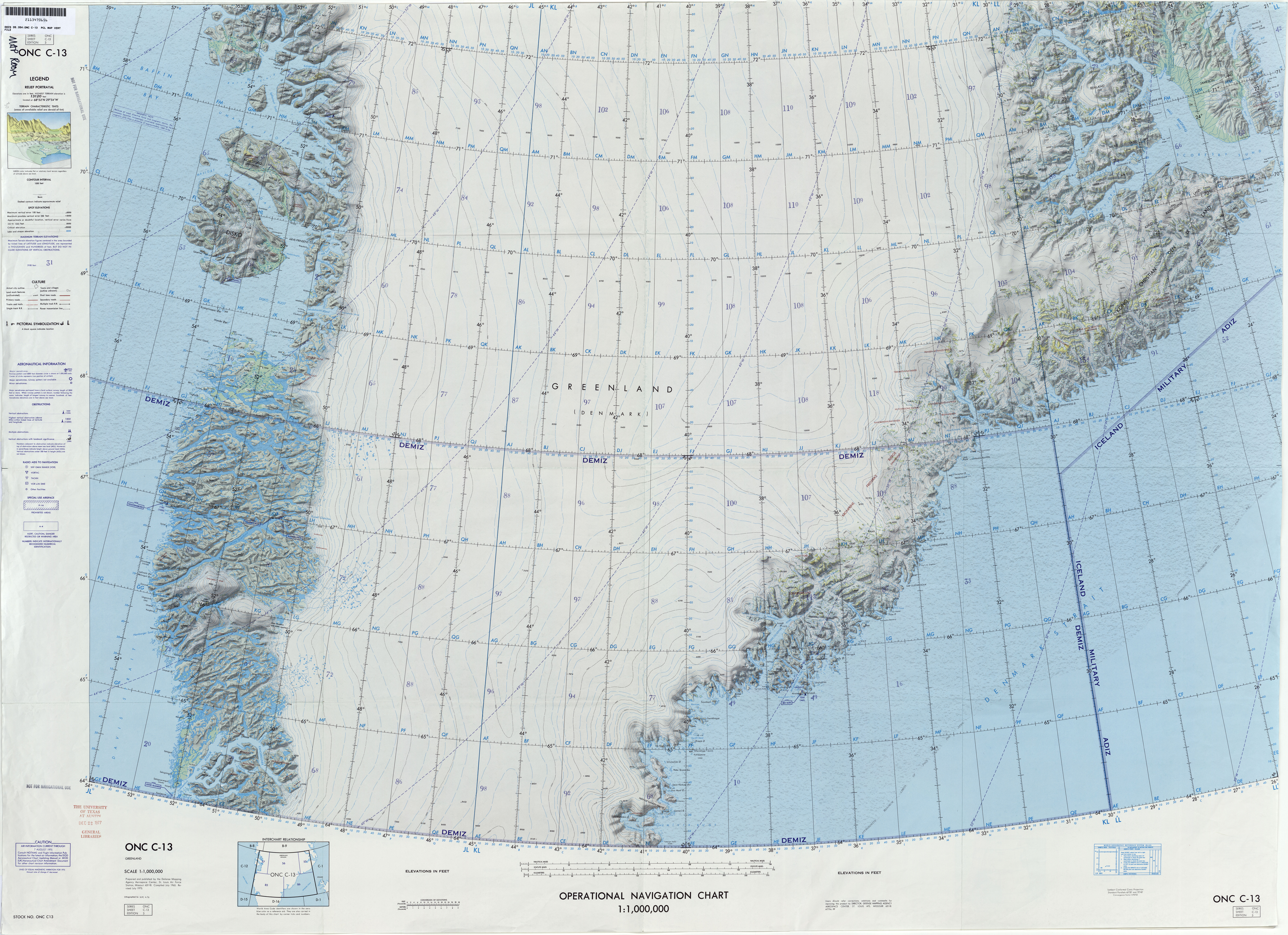
Defense Mapping Agency map of Greenland section

== See also ==
- List of glaciers in Greenland
