= Qulleq =

Island in Kujalleq, Greenland

- Interactive map of Qulleq

Geography
- Location: North Atlantic Ocean; Southeastern Greenland
- Coordinates: 61°33′N 42°16′W
- Highest elevation: 451 m (1480 ft)

Administration
- Greenland
- Municipality: Sermersooq

Demographics
- Population: 0

Qulleq, Qutdleq or Kutdlek is an uninhabited island in the King Frederick VI Coast, Sermersooq municipality in southern Greenland.

== Geography ==
Qulleq is an irregularly-shaped island that lies off the southeastern coast of Greenland. It is located 5.5 km from the shore off the mouth of the Anorituup Kangerlua fjord, to the north-northeast of Cape Tordenskjold, northeast of Nuuk Point.

Qulleq is the largest and southernmost island of a small offshore archipelago of four main islands, including Qipinnguak close by to the west, Takisoq to the northwest and Qeqertarsuaq to the north. The island's length is 6 kilometres (4 miles) and its maximum width 2.8 kilometres (2 miles).

== History ==
Qutsigsormiut is an important Paleo-Eskimo archaeological site on Qulleq's southern coast. It is located by a south-facing bay known as Qulleq Sound that forms a sheltered natural harbour.

A LORAN transmitting station was built on the southeastern point of the island and lies now abandoned.

== See also ==
- List of islands of Greenland
