= Saqqarsuaq Fjord =

Fjord in Greenland

Saqqarsuaq Fjord is a fjord of Greenland. It is located in the Upernavik Archipelago.
