= Isortoq Fjord =

Fjord in Greenland

Location within Greenland

Isortoq Fjord (Danish: Søndre Isortoq) is a fjord in the Qeqqata municipality in western Greenland. The fjord to the east of Maniitsoq, emptying into Davis Strait. Majorqaq, one of the widest rivers in western Greenland draining the Greenland ice sheet, empties into the fjord head.

== Geography ==
Isortoq Fjord is 45 km (28 mi) long. The head of the fjord at 65°35′30″N 51°54′00″W is formed by the delta of the wide Majorqaq river flowing from the north, and the estuary of a smaller Isuitsup Kuua flowing from the east. The fjord flows southwestward, opening into an inlet of Davis Strait at 65°21′00″N 52°40′00″W, to the southeast of Maniitsoq, with its mouth dotted with several skerries on the northern side.

== Settlement ==
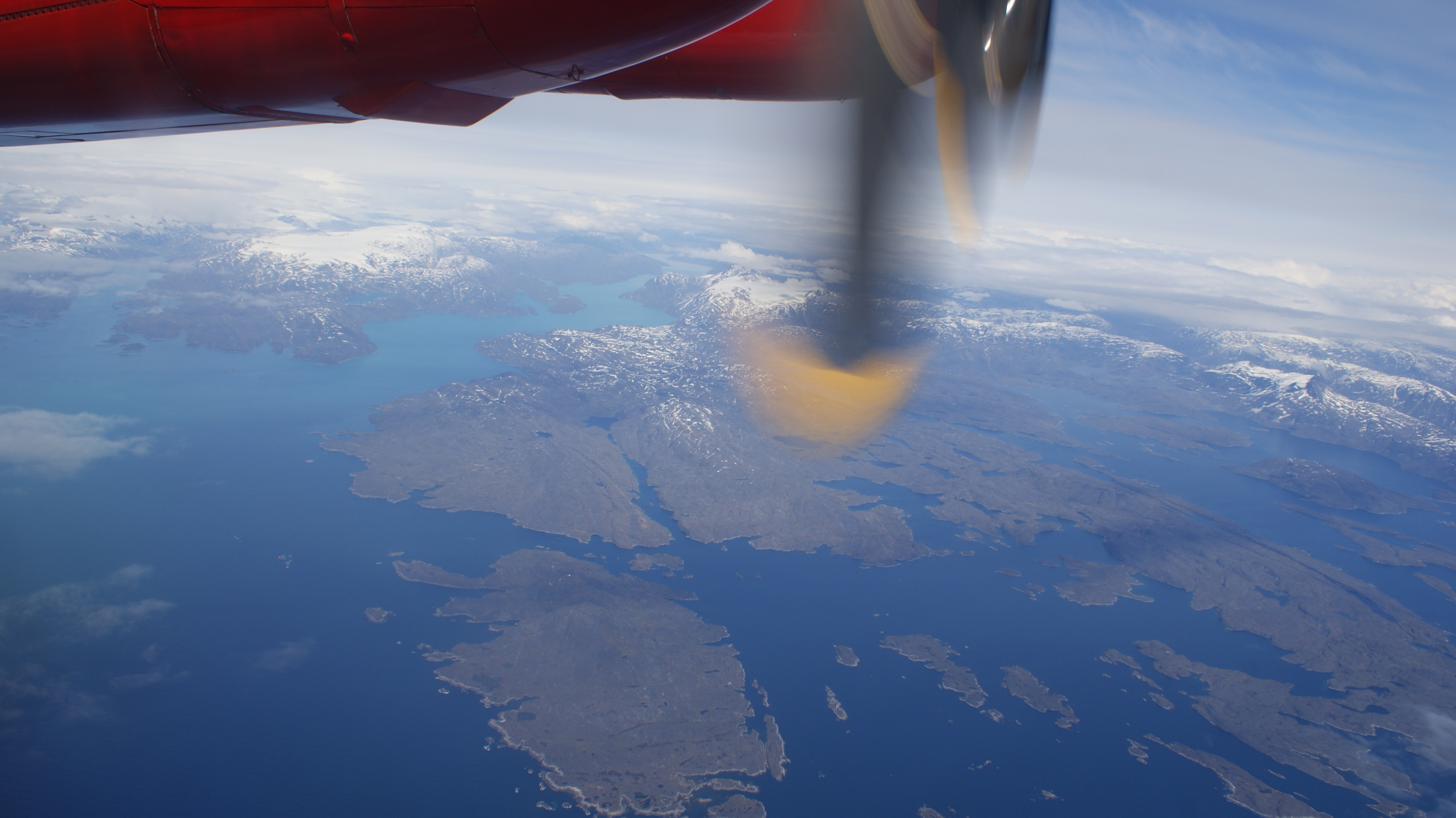
Aerial view of Isortoq Fjord (upper left).

The shores of the fjord are uninhabited. Maniitsoq town is located 10 km (6.2 mi) to the northwest of the fjord mouth, on an island of the same name.
