= Torsukattak Fjord (Disko Bay) =

Fjord in western Greenland

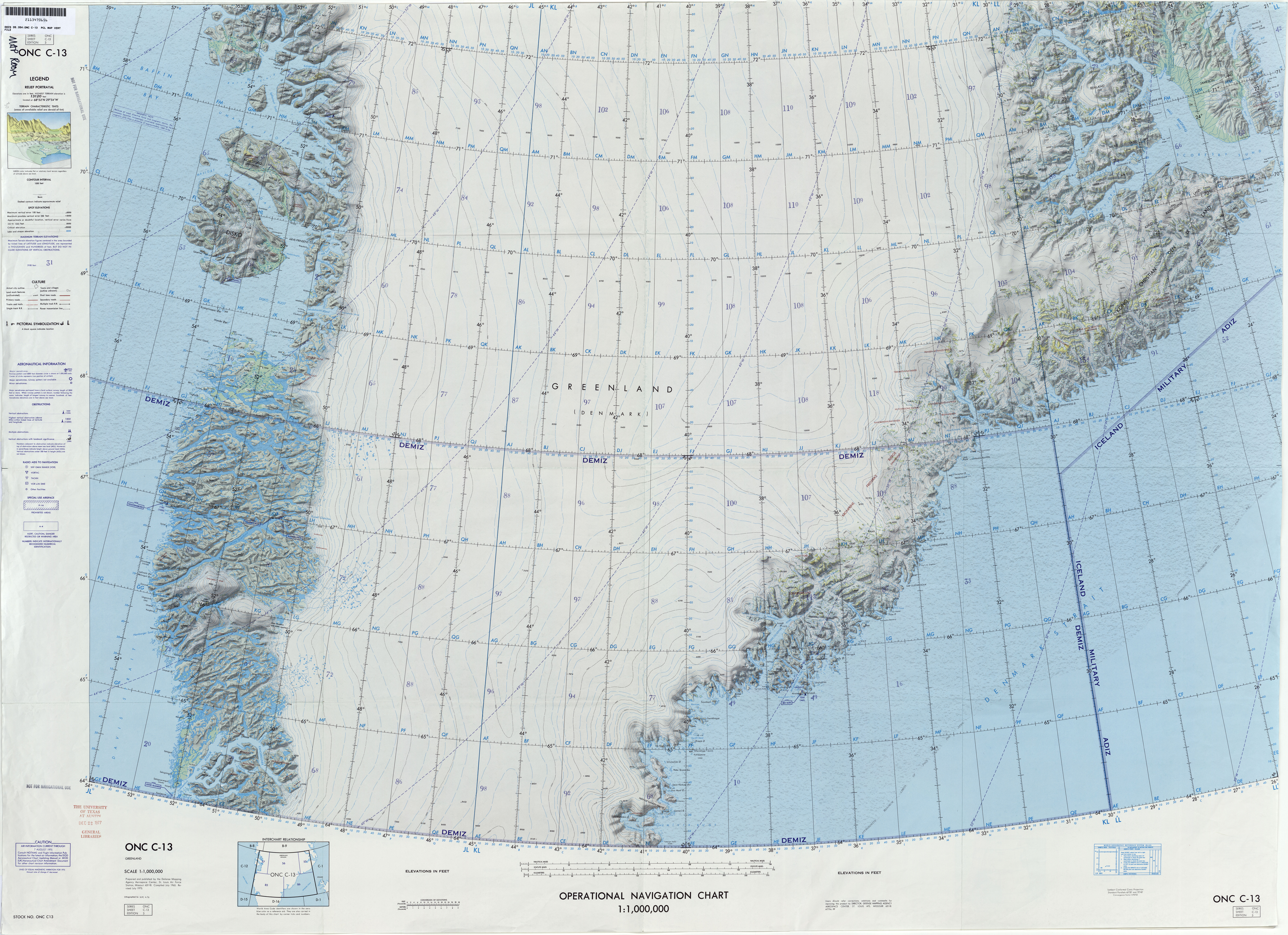
- Map of Greenland section

- Location in Greenland
- Location: Arctic
- Coordinates: 69°58′N 51°5′W
- Ocean/sea sources: Baffin Bay
- Basin countries: Greenland
- Max. length: 50 km (31 mi)
- Max. width: 8 km (5.0 mi)

Torsukattak is a fjord in western Greenland. Administratively it is part of Avannaata municipality.

== Geography ==
Torsukattak Fjord is located to the east of Disko Island (Qeqertarsuaq), across the sound. The fjord is oriented in a roughly east–west direction and opens into the Disko Bay of the Baffin Bay. It has a large glacier and a nunatak at its head.

The 520 m high island of Oqaatsoq is on the southern side of the mouth and Qeqertakavsak lies on the southern shore of the fjord 23 km from its mouth. There are several smaller islands and islets south of Qeqertakavsak.

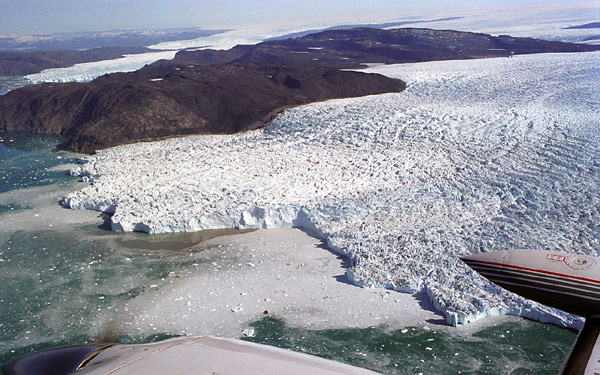
View of Torsukattak Fjord, Disko Bay, from 3,000 ft altitude.

== Bibliography ==
- Ivar Haug (2005). Gazetteer of Greenland UBiT (Trondheim University Library), ISBN 82-7113-114-1

== See also ==
- List of fjords of Greenland
