= Knighton Fjord =

Fjord in Greenland

- Location in Greenland
- Location: Arctic
- Coordinates: 69°24′N 24°44′W
- Ocean/sea sources: Denmark Strait
- Basin countries: Greenland

Knighton Fjord is a fjord in King Christian IX Land, Eastern Greenland. Administratively, Knighton Fjord and its surroundings belong to the Sermersooq municipality.

== Hot Springs ==
A number of hot springs can be found in the fjord, with water temperatures reaching 52 °C to 54 °C.

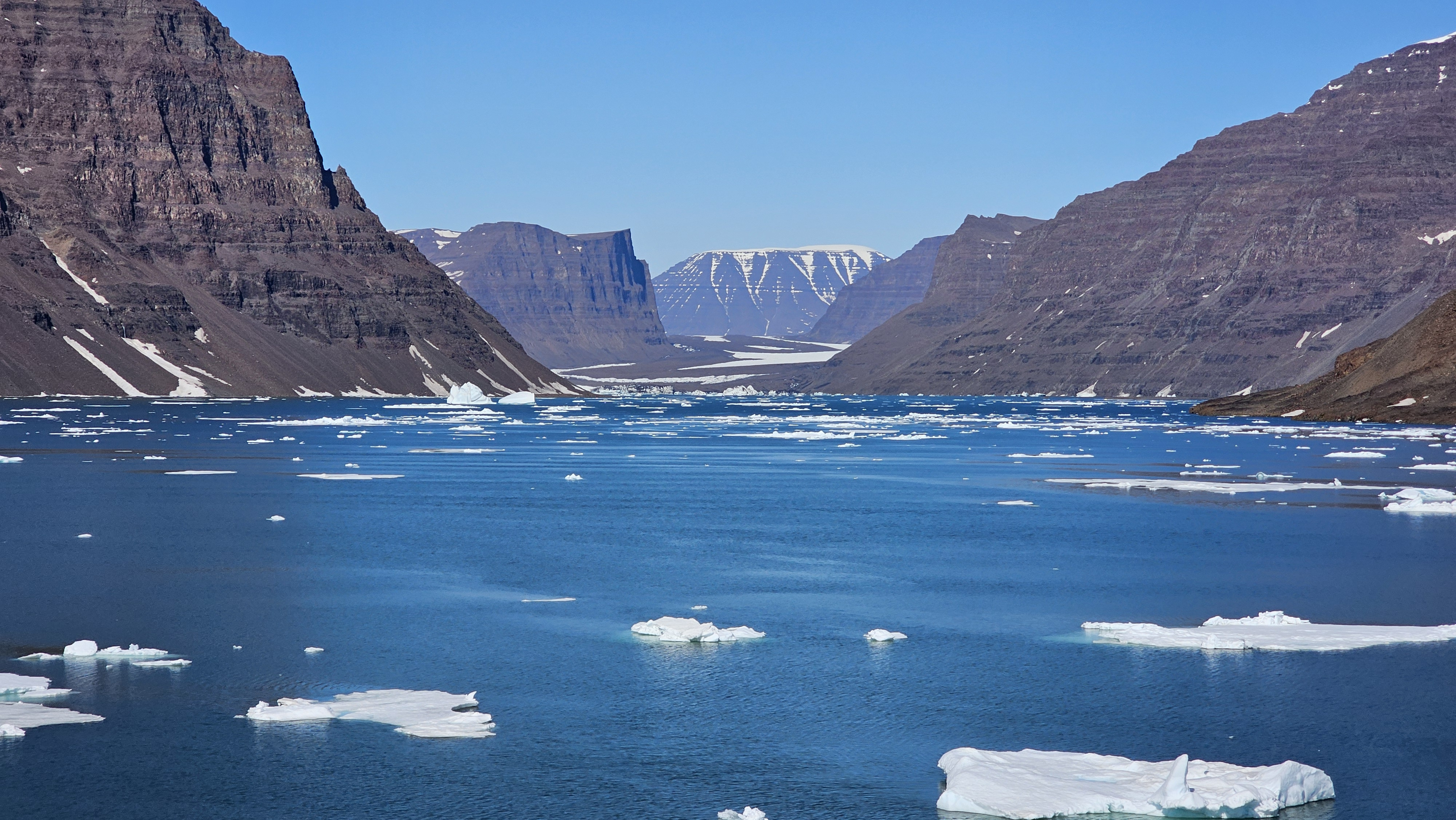
Knighton Fjord view toward the glacier terminus in the west direction.

== See also ==
- List of fjords of Greenland
