= Kangerluarsunnguaq Fjord =

Small fjord in southwestern Greenland

Kangerluarsunnguaq
- Location
- Location: Arctic
- Coordinates: 64°10′30″N 51°31′40″W
- Ocean/sea sources: Labrador Sea
- Basin countries: Greenland
- Max. length: 9 km (5.6 mi)
- Max. width: 2 km (1.2 mi)

Kangerluarsunnguaq Fjord (Danish: Kobbefjord, lit. 'Seal Fjord') is a small fjord in the Sermersooq municipality in southwestern Greenland. Since 2008 the Kobbefjord Research Station, utilized by Nuuk Basic monitoring programme under Greenland Ecosystem Monitoring, has been located on the fjord shores.

== Geography ==
The fjord is located approximately 9 km (5.6 mi) east-south-east of Nuuk, the capital of Greenland. It splits the western tip of a peninsula off the mainland of Greenland into two, emptying into Nuup Kangerlua to the southeast of Nuuk, and to the south of the Ukkusissat mountain.

The 132 kV-powerline from Buksefjord Hydroelectric Power Plant to Nuuk crosses Kangerluarsunnguaq Fjord with a 1,912-metre-long (6,273 ft) span with a clearance of 63.4 metres (208 ft).

== See also ==
- Kangerluarsunnguaq Bay
- Kobbefjorden, Norway, also 'Seal Fjord'
