= Accidents and incidents involving the Boeing B-17 Flying Fortress =

This is a partial list of accidents and incidents involving the Boeing-designed B-17 Flying Fortress. Combat losses are not included except for a very few cases denoted by singular circumstances. A few documented drone attrition cases are also included.

Aircraft were constructed by a three-firm consortium, Boeing, Vega and Douglas, known by the acronym BVD. Boeing built aircraft at their plant in Seattle, Washington, and their production models were appended -BO. Douglas Aircraft Company constructed aircraft at Long Beach, California, with a -DL suffix. The Vega Aircraft Corporation, a subsidiary of the Lockheed Aircraft Company, at Burbank, California, delivered aircraft with the -VE suffix.

== 1930s ==
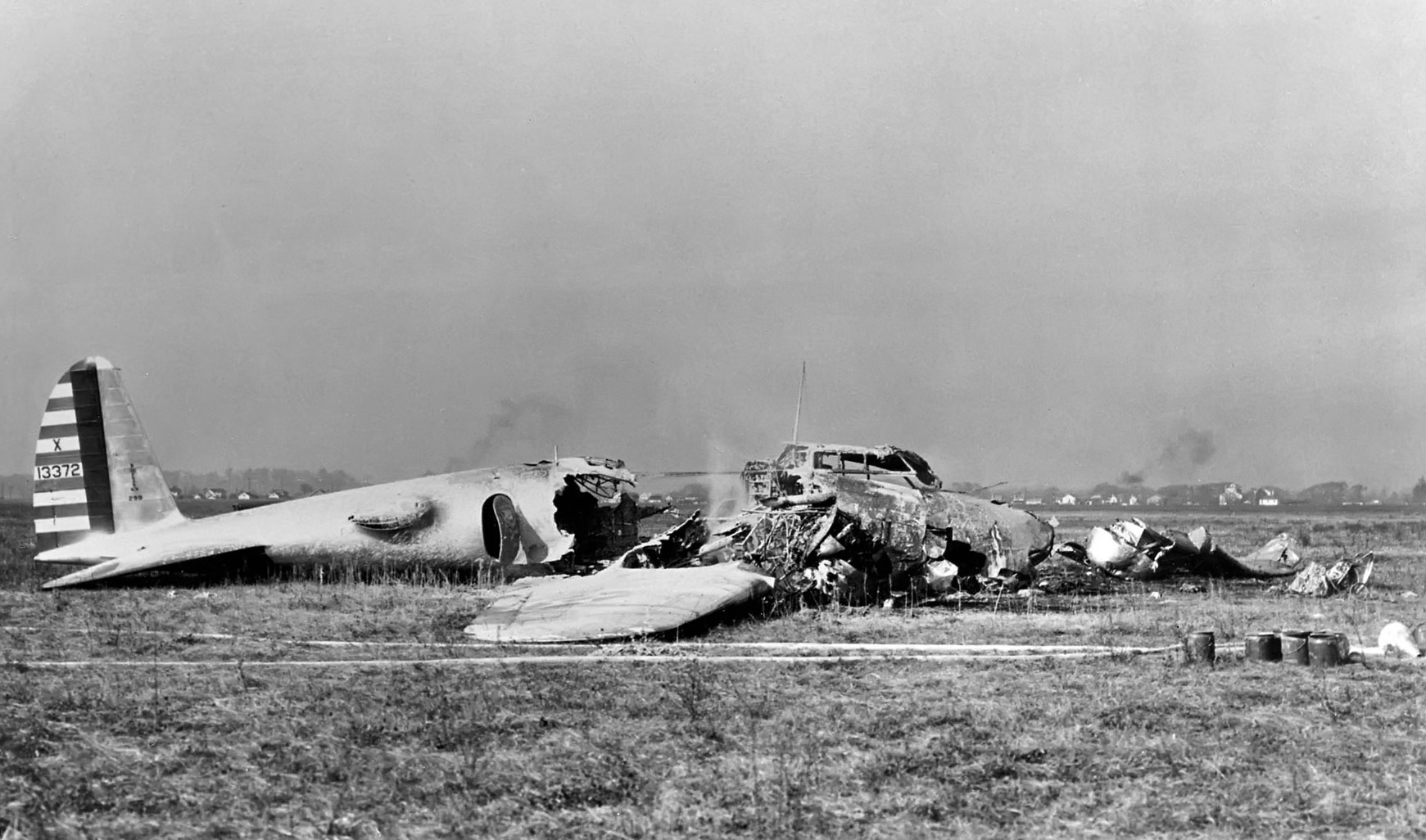
Crashed Model 299 at Wright Field, Ohio.

30 October 1935
Prototype Boeing Model 299, NX13372, 'X13372', c/n 1963, the future B-17, crashes on take-off from Wright Field, Ohio, due to locked control surfaces, killing early military aviator and test pilot Maj. Ployer Peter Hill. Other engineers taken to hospital with injuries. Boeing test pilot and observer Les Tower died later. Ogden Air Depot, Utah, renamed Hill Field, (later Hill Air Force Base), on 1 December 1939. As the prototype was owned by Boeing, it had no USAAC serial. Some people cite the inadvertent take-off configuration which caused this accident (forgetting to unlock the control surfaces before takeoff) as the origin of today’s ubiquitous aviation “checklist”.
7 December 1936
First Y1B-17, 36-149, c/n 1973, first flown 2 December, makes rough landing at Boeing Field, Seattle, Washington, on third flight, when Army pilot Stanley Umstead touches down with locked brakes, airframe ends up on nose after short skid. Repaired, Flying Fortress departs for Wright Field on 11 January 1937.

== 1940s ==
18 December 1940
Boeing Y1B-17 Flying Fortress, 36–157, c/n 1981, formerly of the 2nd Bomb Group, Langley Field, Virginia, transferred to the 93d Bomb Squadron, 19th Bomb Group, March Field, California, in October 1940, crashed E of San Jacinto, California, 3.5 miles NNW of Idyllwild, while en route to March Field. Pilot was John H. Turner.

6 February 1941
B-17B Flying Fortress, 38-216, c/n 2009, crashes near Lovelock, Nevada, while en route to Wright Field, Ohio, killing all eight on board. Pilot Capt. Richard S. Freeman had shared the 1939 MacKay Trophy for the Boeing XB-15 flight from Langley Field, Virginia via Panama and Lima, Peru at the request of the American Red Cross, for delivering urgently needed vaccines and other medical supplies in areas of Chile devastated by an earthquake. General Order Number 10, dated 3 March 1943, announces that the advanced flying school being constructed near Seymour, Indiana, is to be named Freeman Field in honor of the Hoosier native.

22 June 1941
Royal Air Force Boeing Fortress I, AN522, of No. 90 Squadron, RAF Great Massingham, flown by F/O J. C. Hawley, breaks up in mid-air over Yorkshire during a training flight. Single survivor, a medical officer from RAE Farnborough, reports that the bomber entered a cumulo-nimbus cloud at 33,000 feet (10,000 m), became heavily iced-up with hailstones entering through open gunports, after which control was lost, the port wing detached, and the fuselage broke in two at 25,000 feet (7,600 m). Survivor, who was in the aft fuselage, was able to bail out at 12,000 feet (3,700 m).

3 July 1941
Royal Air Force Boeing Fortress I, AN528, of No. 90 Squadron, RAF Polebrook, is destroyed when a troublesome engine catches fire during a late-night ground run.

2 November 1941
B-17C, 40-2047, of the 7th Bomb Group, en route from Salt Lake City, Utah, to McClellan Field, near Sacramento, California, enters a winter storm over the Sierras, stalls at 18,000 feet and spins in, coming down near Georgetown, California, ~30 miles NE of Placerville. Eight of nine crew successfully parachute down, pilot is KWF. Scattered wreckage is still where it fell.
3 April 1942
The 303rd Bomb Group, activated at Pendleton Field, Oregon, on 3 February 1942, suffers its first fatal aircraft accident when three flying officers and five enlisted crew are killed in the crash of a B-17E-BO, 41-9053, six miles (9.7 km) N of Strevell, Idaho during a training mission.

6 April 1942
B-17B, 38-214, of the 12th Bomb Squadron, 39th Bomb Group, Davis-Monthan Field, Arizona, suffers engine failure with one bursting into flame, the bomber crashing into the desert 22 miles SE of Tucson, killing five crew. "The dead and their addresses, as announced by Col. Lowell H. Smith, commander of Davis-Monthan air corps base, who said the tragedy was due to 'engine failure and fire in the air,' were: First Lieut. Donald W. Johnson, the pilot, of Dunning, Neb.; Sgt. Laurel D. Larsen, Minkcreek, Idaho; Pvt. Herbert W. Dunn, Mifflintown, Pa.; Pvt. Emerson L. Wallace, Philipsburg, Pa.; Pvt. Leo W. Thomas, Lemoore, California. Second Lieut. Sidney L. Fouts, of Santa Rosa, California, and Sgt. William F. Regan, of Dunmore, Pa., parachuted to safety, suffering only minor injuries and shock, the air base said."

27 June 1942
During Operation Bolero, the ferrying of combat aircraft from the U.S. to England by air, B-17E-BO, 41-9090, c/n 2562, ditches in a Greenland fjord near Narasak. Attempts have been made to locate the airframe, particularly by noted recovery expert Gary Larkins, but it has yet to be found. Provisionally assigned the FAA registration N3142U if it can be found and retrieved from 1,500 feet of water.
15 July 1942
During Operation Bolero, the ferrying of combat aircraft from the U.S. to England by air, a flight of two B-17E-BO Flying Fortresses, 41-9101, c/n 2573, "Big Stoop", and 41-9105, c/n 2577, "Do-Do", of the 97th Bomb Group and six P-38F Lightnings of the 94th Fighter Squadron, 1st Fighter Group, on the 845-mile (1,360 km) leg between Bluie West 8 airfield and Reykjavík, Iceland, run out of fuel after being held up by bad weather, and all force-land on the Greenland icecap. All safely belly in except for the first P-38 which attempts a wheels-down landing, flipping over as nosewheel catches a crevasse, but pilot Lt. Brad McManus unhurt. All crews rescued on 19 July, but aircraft are abandoned in place. One P-38F-1-LO, 41-7630, c/n 222-5757, now known as "Glacier Girl", recovered in 1992 from under 200 feet (61 m) of accumulated snow and ice and rebuilt to flying status, registered N17630. One B-17 ("Big Stoop") also found, but it is too badly crushed for recovery. Although the USAAF had expected to lose 10 percent of the 920 planes that made the North Atlantic transit during Bolero, losses were only 5.2 percent, the majority being involved in this single incident.

18 July 1942
"It was about 3:20 p.m. on a foggy Saturday afternoon during the World War II years when 16-year-old Leonard (Gig) Stephens heard through the cold mist the sound of an aircraft in trouble near his home by the Red Hill Country Club, not far from Route 62, and he ran outside to see a B-17 Flying Fortress bomber on a descent to death. He will never forget, he says, the sight of an airman standing in an open hatchway as the plane started to clip the tops of pine trees into a wooded area, too low for a parachute to work. The engines were spitting flames. The plane cut a path 200 feet long and 40 feet wide..." B-17B, 39-8, of the 492d Bomb Squadron, flying from Gander Field, Newfoundland, piloted by Marion R. Klyce, comes down at North Reading, Massachusetts; scrapped at North Reading, 2 October 1942. "The Veterans’ Memorial on the town common commemorates the ten crew members who lost their lives in this crash. They were Orville Andrews, Robert Aulsbury, Stephen Bilocur, Archie Jester, Don Johnson, Marion Klyce, Sidney Koltun, William Perkins, James Phillips and Charles Torrence."

23 August 1942
B-17E-BO, 41-9091, of the 427th Bomb Squadron, 303rd Bomb Group, operating out of Biggs Field, El Paso, Texas, suffers center fuselage failure in extremely bad weather 12 miles W of Las Cruces, New Mexico, only the radio operator and the engineering officer for the 427th Bomb Squadron, both in the radio room, survive by parachuting. Pilot was James E. Hudson. The 303rd BG was due to deploy overseas from Biggs on 24 August.

17 September 1942
A B-17E, 41-2650, of the 93d Bombardment Squadron, 19th Bombardment Group, based at Mareeba airfield in north Queensland, Australia, departed Seven Mile Aerodrome at Port Moresby to bomb Rabaul. Piloted by 2nd Lt. Claude N. Burckey, the crew completed the mission and set an initial return path for Port Moresby, which was clouded in, and then for Horn Island. The aircraft became lost and ran out of fuel over Cape York, Australia. The crew bailed out, and the aircraft crashed N of Weipa. 1st. Lt. William F. Meenagh (0-372623) was never found, the other eight crew members survived.

15 October 1942
Nine men are killed when B-17E-BO, 41-9161, of the 459th Bomb Squadron, 330th Bombardment Group, Alamogordo, New Mexico, piloted by John R. Pratt, crashes into Magdalena Peak, 6 miles SE of Magdalena, New Mexico. Forest Ranger Arthur Gibson reported the crash.

21 October 1942
B-17D, 40-3089, of the 5th Bomb Group/11th Bomb Group, with Capt. Eddie Rickenbacker, America's top-scoring World War I ace (26 kills), aboard on a secret mission, is lost at sea in the central Pacific Ocean when the bomber goes off-course. After 24 days afloat in three rafts, he and surviving crew are rescued by the U.S. Navy after having been given up for lost, discovered by OS2U Kingfisher crew.

30 December 1942
B-17F-35-BO, 42-5123, of the 20th Bomb Squadron, 2d Bomb Group, Great Falls Army Air Base, Montana, piloted by Edward T. Layfield, crashes near Musselshell, Montana. Capt. John Lloyd, public relations officer at the Great Falls base, said that eleven aboard were killed.

3 January 1943
A B-17F-27-BO, 41-24620, "Snap! Crackle! Pop!", of the 360th Bomb Squadron, 303rd Bomb Group, was on a daylight raid over Saint-Nazaire, France, and lost a wing due to flak, it then went into a flat spin. Ball turret gunner Alan Magee (13 January 1919 – 20 December 2003), though suffering 27 shrapnel wounds, bailed out (or was thrown from the wreckage) without his parachute at ~20,000 feet (6,100 m),he lost consciousness due to altitude and freefall plunged through the glass roof of the Gare de Saint-Nazaire and was found alive but with serious injuries on the floor of the depot , he was saved by German medical care and spent the rest of the war in a prison camp.

11 February 1943
B-17F-50-BO, 42-5367, of the 317th Bomb Squadron, 88th Bomb Group, with ten aboard goes missing on flight from Walla Walla Army Air Base, Washington. Civil Air Patrol planes spot the wreckage on 14 February in the Blue Mountains, 17 miles E of Walla Walla, where the bomber apparently flew head-on into a ridge at about the 5,000-foot level. Ground parties reach the site on 16 February and confirm the crew dead. Victims: Lt. John T. Ray, Klamath Falls, Oregon, pilot; Lt. Richard H. Reed, temporarily residing at Walla Walla; Lt. David T. Dunning, Madisonville, Kentucky; Lt. Hans N. Lehne, Glen Ellyn, Illinois; Sgt. Alexander Dee, Buffalo, New York; Sgt. Lloyd I. Ball, Huntington Park, California; Sgt. Milton D. Johnson, Midland, Texas; Sgt. C. W. Seifer Jr., San Jose, California; Sgt. Joseph F. Perkins, Fort Worth, Texas; Sgt. Wilmer C. Fankhavel, Barnesville, Minnesota.

30 May 1943
A B-17F-45-BO, 42-5318, of the 464th Bomb Squadron, 331st Bomb Group, out of Casper Army Air Field, Wyoming, piloted by James O. Westbury, crashes into a mountainside ~10 miles NW of Covelo, California, during a training mission killing all six crew. Some wreckage remains at the site.

14 June 1943

B-17C, 40-2072, "Miss E.M.F." (Every Morning Fixing), of the 19th Bomb Group, heavily damaged on Davao mission 25 December 1941 and converted into transport. With 46th Troop Carrier Squadron, 317th Troop Carrier Group, crashed Bakers Creek, Queensland, Australia, this date while ferrying troops to New Guinea. Six crew and 34 GIs killed. One survived. A memorial to the victims of this crash was installed at the Selfridge Gate of Arlington National Cemetery on 11 June 2009, donated by the Bakers Creek Memorial Association. The gate is named for Lt. Thomas Selfridge, killed in a 1908 crash at Fort Myer, Virginia, the first victim of a powered air accident.

16 June 1943
B-17E-BO converted to XB-38-VE, 41-2401, with Allison V-1710 liquid-cooled engines. Wrecked near Tipton, California, on its ninth test flight when the number three (starboard inner) engine caught fire. Attempts to extinguish it were unsuccessful, and as the fire spread to the wing, the pilots bailed out after pointing the aircraft to an uninhabited area. Lockheed test pilot George MacDonald was killed when his parachute did not deploy, and Lockheed test pilot Bud Martin was seriously injured when his parachute did not deploy properly.

28 June 1943
B-17F-55-DL, 42-3399, "Scharazad", of the Plummer Provisional Group, 318th Bomb Squadron, flying to Grand Island, Nebraska, from Pendleton Army Air Base in Oregon crashes on Bomber Mountain in the Big Horn Mountains of Wyoming. 10 crew members were killed. Wreckage finally discovered on 12 August 1945.

1 August 1943
B-17F-95-BO, 42-30326, c/n 5440, of the 541st Bomb Squadron, 383d Bomb Group, piloted by Roy J. Lee, was headed north up the Oregon coast on a routine patrol flight. The plane had left Pendleton Field, near Pendleton, Oregon, at 0900 and was tasked with flying to Cape Disappointment on the Oregon coast. They were then to fly 500 miles out to sea, followed by a direct flight back to Pendleton Field. On arriving at the coast, the crew found the entire area hidden in overcast clouds which extended to an elevation of 8000 feet. The pilot decided to locate Cape Disappointment by flying below the overcast. The overcast proved to reach almost to the level of the sea. The plane was flying at about 50–150 feet above the waves. Deciding that the risk was too great the crew began to climb back up into the overcast. Unfortunately, the plane crashed into the side of Cape Lookout at about 900 feet in elevation. The Aviation Archeological Investigation & Research website lists the crash date as 2 August.

2 August 1943
B-17E-BO, 41-2463, "Yankee Doodle", of the 19th Bomb Group, then to 394th Bomb Squadron, 5th Bomb Group, crashes on takeoff due mechanical failure at Espiritu Santo, New Hebrides, Bombardier Sgt. John P. Kruger and navigator Lt. Talbert H. Woolam are killed. Pilot was Gene Roddenberry, future creator of Star Trek. The airframe was stricken on 13 August 1943.

1 September 1943
"GREAT FALLS, Mont., Sept. 2. (AP) - Ten crew members of a four-engined bomber from the Great Falls army air base, killed early today when the ship crashed five miles east of Fort Benton, were identified tonight by Capt. John R. Lloyd, base public relations officer, as follows: Sergeant Robert H. Hall, Coldwater, Mich.; Sergeant John T. Huff, Cherokee, Kan.; Sergeant Carl E. Lower, Van Wert, Ohio; Sergeant Chester W. Peko, Throop, Pa.; Private First Class Paul Peterson, Colfax, Wis.; Sergeant Curio C. Thrementi, Vassar, Mich.; Lieutenant Harold L. Wonders, Waterloo, Iowa; Lieutenant Warren H. Maginn, Glendale, Los Angeles; Lieutenant Jack Y. Fisk, Los Angeles, and Lieutenant Arnold J. Gardiner, New York. The crash occurred during a routine training flight." Boeing B-17F-35-BO Flying Fortress, 42-5128, of the 612th Bomb Squadron, 401st Bomb Group, was flown by Lt. Maginn.

2 September 1943
B-17F-40-VE, 42-5977, of the 540th Bomb Squadron (Heavy), 383d Bomb Group (Heavy), Geiger Field, Washington, on a routine local flight with three aboard, piloted by Robert P. Ferguson, clips the tops of trees for several blocks, crashes into scrub pines two miles S of Geiger Field and burns. Only three were on the bomber, said a report by Lt. R. E. Reed, public relations officer at the field. Names were withheld pending notification of next of kin.

1 October 1943
B-17F "42-6090" of the 612th Bomb Squadron, 401st Bomb Group "...on the morning of October 1st we lost another crew with the exception of their grounded navigator, Lt. Brandt. This was Lt. McIlwain's crew which was in an unfortunate crash on a routine training flight, again near Fort Benton. Their loss was keenly felt by all." "On October 1st, the 612th Squadron lost a Flying Fortress with nine men aboard in an accident over the Big Sandy bombing range. The Fortress was piloted by 2nd Lt. John McIlwain. The plane was flying in formation as they approached the bombing range when observers in other Fortresses saw it go out of control and spin in. All the crew were killed." Crew: 2nd Lt. John W. McIlwain, 2nd Lt. William D. Ford, 2nd Lt. George W. Heaps, S/Sgt. John Cirone, S/Sgt. Edwin B. Young, Sgt. Carl A. Hilton, Sgt. George W Grimes, Sgt. Edward F. Tessier, Cpl. Ambrose E. Mesa

8 November 1943
B-17F-75-DL 42-3553, c/n 8489, 'QJ-H', "Sad Sack", of the 339th Bomb Squadron, 96th Bomb Group, crashes at Middle Farm, West Harling, Norfolk, United Kingdom shortly after taking off from RAF Snetterton Heath with the loss of all ten crew

10 November 1943
Boeing B-17G-15-DL, 42-37831, c/n 8517, of the 331st Bomb Group, 94th Bomb Group, suffered a hydraulics and brakes failure at RAF Snetterton Heath and was written off.
9 December 1943
B-17G-20-BO, 42-31468, "The Galley Uncle", force landed during ferry flight from Gander in a field adjacent to Graan Monastery, near Enniskillen, County Fermanagh, Northern Ireland. One crew died and five were saved by local monks.

13 November 1943
Boeing B-17 "Miriam" of the 367th Bomb Squadron, 306th Bomb Group, crashed near Princes Risborough, Buckinghamshire, England. Shortly after taking off in bad weather, the aircraft flew into a downdraft which sent it into a dive. Most of the crew bailed out, but the pilot, 2nd Lt. Clyde "Sparky" Cosper, stayed with the aircraft and avoided crashing into rooftops before impacting a field. The bomb load detonated on impact, destroying the aircraft and killing Cosper. A plaque dedicated to Cosper was erected outside the Princes Risborough Library.

29 November 1943
Boeing B-17F informally known as the Rikki Tikki Tavi was shot down over Syke in what is now Lower Saxony. despite the rear machine gunner not deploying a parachute. Eight of the ten crew members were killed in the crash, and two survived, including the tail gunner Eugene P. Moran, who survived a fall of 28,000 feet inside the tail section of the aircraft.

2 January 1944
"NORNICK, [sic] Iowa, Jan. 2 (AP) - Nine crew members of a Flying Fortress based at Sioux City, were killed when the plane crashed and burned on a farm near here late today. Persons within a radius of several miles said they saw the plane explode and crash." B-17F-40-VE, 42-6013, of the 393d CCTS, piloted by Frank R. Hilford, appears to be the airframe involved.

2 January 1944
"SACRAMENTO, Calif., Jan. 2 (AP) - Thirteen army flyers were killed today when a B-17 Flying Fortress, headed for Los Angeles from McChord field, Tacoma, Wash., exploded in flight over McClellan field and plunged 3000 feet to the ground in flames. Thousands of Sacramentans, startled by a terrific explosion, looked skyward and saw the crippled and burning four-motored bomber emerge from the overcast sky and fall. Only one member of the plane's crew of 14 escaped the flaming wreckage, parachuting to safety before the crash. He was Maj. James H. Wergen of Kingman field, Ariz., the bomber's home base. The plane went to pieces in the air as it fell, scattering a wingtip, one of its motors and other parts over a vast area. McClellan field authorities said medical officers were attempting to identify the dead, but that names would be withheld pending notification of next of kin." The B-17G, 42-40024, was piloted by Frederick M. Klopfenstein.

4 January 1944
B-17G-10-BO, 42-31257, flying in formation with other B-17s, catches fire near Alamo, Nevada, while en route between Indian Springs Army Airfield and Las Vegas Army Airfield, Nevada, and twelve of thirteen aboard bail out. One is killed when his parachute fails to open in time, and one aboard the bomber dies in the crash 67 miles NNE of Las Vegas AAF. Other planes circled the spot where the plane went down and radioed the base news of the crash. "Eleven of their number were brought to the airfield hospital last night (5 January), suffering from minor injuries and exposure after having spent the intervening time in heavy snow on a high mountain plateau."

13 January 1944
B-17G-30-DL, 42-38094, flown by Ralph M. Calhoon, and B-17G-10-VE, 42-40038, piloted by Thomas W. Williams, of the 99th Bomb Squadron, collide ~10 miles SW of Brooksville Army Airfield, Florida, killing four officers and five enlisted men, reports Brigadier General Hume Peabody, commander of the Army Air Forces Tactical Center (AAFTAC), at Orlando. One victim is Sgt. Benjamin B. Estes, son of J. M. Estes, Burley, Idaho.

15 January 1944
B-17F-50-VE, 42-6147, of the 818th Bomb Squadron (H), 483d Bomb Group (H), MacDill Field, Florida, piloted by William R. Sablotny, lost in a blizzard over the Allegheny Mountains, crashes three miles N of Rich Mountain, West Virginia, killing six of seven aboard, state police said 16 January.

4 February 1944
B-17F-90-BO, 42-30188, "Temptation", with nose art of a black cat considering dropping a bomb, previously "Kats Sass II", 'MZ S' of the 413th Bomb Squadron, 96th Bomb Group, during takeoff for a Frankfort mission, suffers runaways on Nos. 1 and 2 propellers. Lt. Joseph Meacham attempts landing at near-by as yet unfinished base, but crash lands at East Shropham, Norfolk, NNW of RAF Snetterton Heath. All eleven crew survive but the aircraft is damaged beyond repair and is written off, fit only for parts salvage.

22 February 1944
A B-17F of the U.S. Army Air Force's 1st Radar Calibration Detachment, name undocumented, flying from Bangor, Maine, to Fort Dix, New Jersey, crashed on the Kittatinny Mountains near Millbrook, New Jersey. The accident was due to a radio failure and navigational problems, as well as heavy icing due to the wintry conditions. Pilot inexperience was also a contributor to the accident. All twelve occupants; five Army officers, six enlisted Army members, and one Royal Air Force navigator, were killed. The aircraft was completely destroyed.

9 March 1944
B-17G 42-37781 Silver Dollar was downed over Osdorf en-route to Berlin after the tailplane was blown off by a bomb dropped by an aircraft of the 379th Bomb Group positioned above Silver Dollar in the formation at the time of the accident. Photographs taken from neighbouring aircraft showed Silver Dollar pitching down with its tail empennage missing.

23 March 1944
B17 from 305th BG based at Chelveston crashed shortly after take-off into the Bedfordshire village of Yelden. The aircraft sliced through a barrack block housing men from the airfield and partially demolished a farm bungalow. 21 persons died in the accident, including 2 children (Monica & Keith Phillips) who were asleep in the bungalow. A post-crash fire caused the bomb load to explode blowing out the windows of houses in the village including the nearby church. A plaque in the village church, St Marys, shows the names of those who perished in the crash.

9 April 1944
B-17G-35-VE 42-97854 of the 390th Bomb Group, on a ferry flight from the United States to England, piloted by George L. Williamson, ditches in the Graah Fjord, Greenland this date (another source states that it was ditched in "Lageons Fjord") —probably after Cape Langenæs at the entrance of Graah Fjord. Attempts by noted aircraft recovery expert Gary Larkins to locate the airframe have been unsuccessful. MACR report 3637. FAA registration N9094V to Institute of Aeronautical Archaeological Research of Auburn, California, provisionally assigned to this airframe.

24 April 1944
B-17G-55-BO 42-102685 of the 271st Air Base Unit, Kearney Army Airfield, Nebraska, crashes six miles N of Bertrand, Nebraska, after an oxygen fire breaks out in flight. Six crew bail out but both pilots are killed. Dead were 2d Lt. Thomas G. Eppinger, pilot, of Huntington Woods, Michigan; and 2d Lt. Robert D. Shaw, co-pilot, of Vicksburg, Mississippi. Survivors were 2d Lt. Voris H. Fabik, navigator, of East St. Louis, Illinois; 2d Lt. Lewis E. Louraine, bombardier, of Purcell, Oklahoma; 2d Lt. Robert Durocher, assistant bombardier, hometown not available; S/Sgt. Clifford M. Bowen, engineer, of Jefferson, Oregon; S/Sgt. Obert M. Lay, radioman, of Aurora, Illinois; and Sgt. James T. Grantham, waist gunner, of Phoenix, Arizona.

11 July 1944
B-17G-75-BO 43-38023 en route from Kearney Army Airfield, Nebraska, to Dow Field, Maine, for overseas deployment, crashes into Deer Mountain in Parkertown Township in North Oxford, Maine, during a thunderstorm, killing all ten crew: Sgt. James A. Benson, Sgt. Gerald V. Biddle, 2nd Lt. John T. Cast, 2nd Lt. John W. Drake, 2nd Lt. William Hudgens, Cpl. John H. Jones, Staff Sgt. Wayne D. McGavran, Sgt. Cecil L. Murphy, 2nd Lt. Robert S. Talley, and Sgt. Clarence M. Waln. Locals saw the plane circling before it struck terrain 500 feet below the summit. It apparently descended below the clouds, struck treetops, and cartwheeled across the mountainside. Two days later, after a search by more than 100 spotters from the Civil Air Patrol, the Army Air Force, the Navy, and the Royal Canadian Air Force, the B-17’s wreckage was found on the side of the mountain. This was the second-worst military crash in Maine history, occurring the same day as an A-26 Invader crash at Portland that killed 21.

19 July 1944
B-17G-60-BO 42-102937, "Ready Freddie", of the 412th Bomb Squadron, 95th Bomb Group, crashed at RAF Duxford, Cambridgeshire, United Kingdom, when attempting to buzz the airfield at too low an altitude. The aircraft clipped a hangar and crashed into a barracks block killing all thirteen on board and one person on the ground.

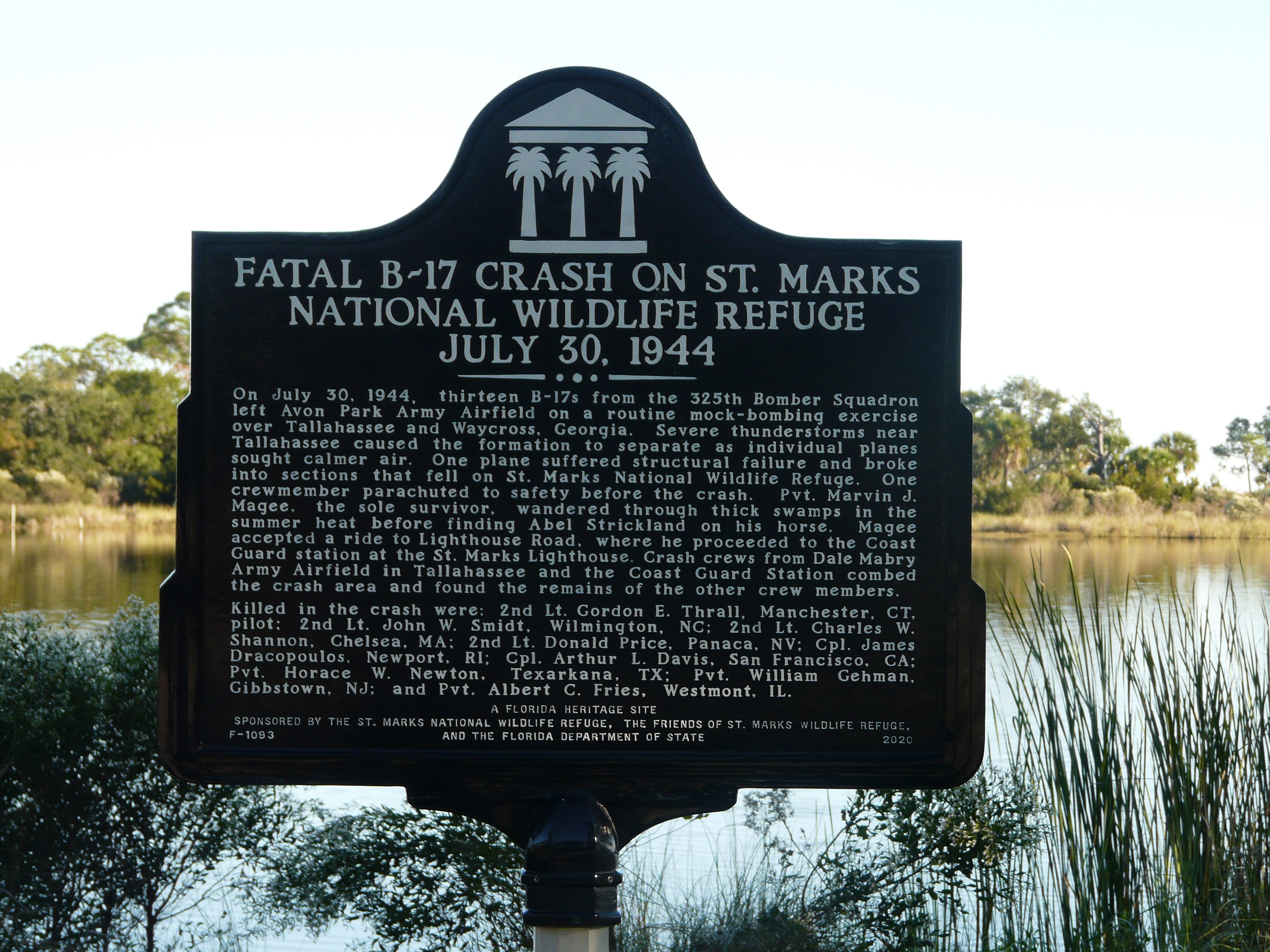
Commemorative marker for the 30 July 1944 crash near St. Marks National Wildlife Refuge in Florida

30 July 1944
B-17G-60-BO 42-102746 departed from Avon Park Army Air Field on a training mission and crashed near St. Marks, Florida. Nine of the ten crew members on board were killed; Pvt. Marvin J. Magee of Sunny Hill, Louisiana, bailed out and was the sole survivor.

17 August 1944
B-17G-60-BO 42-37863 crashed nine miles northeast of Pierre, South Dakota, six miles north of the Pierre army air base, at 10:30 pm. Six crew were killed, and three parachuted to safety, members of the 225 Base Unit Combat Training Squadron, Pierre Army Base, South Dakota. Killed in the crash were 2nd Lt. Arnold Sparmann, pilot, 2nd Lt. Bob M. Biggers Jr., 2nd Lt. John F. Hanzes, 2nd Lt. Arthur M. Lippman, bombardier, Sgt. Samuel J. Lamazzo, and Cpl. Frederick "Fritz" J. Breuning. Cpl. Harry F. Mroch of Detroit, Cpl. Sidney Nylaan of Grand Rapids, and Cpl. George D. Honey of Sonoma parachuted to safety and were hospitalized in Pierre. Witnesses said the bomber was burning before it crashed and that wreckage was strewn over an area of approximately four city blocks. Bodies of the six men who died in the crash were thrown clear of the plane. A board of qualified officers were appointed to investigate the crash.

8 September 1944
2d Lt. John T. McCarthy, in Republic P-47D-6-RE Thunderbolt, 42-74782, of the 262d FPTS, on a combined interception training mission out of Bruning Army Air Field, Nebraska, at ~1540 hrs. CWT, at 16,000 feet altitude, made a pursuit curve mock attack from the high port side of Boeing B-17G-35-DL Flying Fortress, 42-107159, terminating his attack from about 250 to 300 yards away from the bomber, but "mushed" into the B-17 while breaking away, hitting the port wing near the number one (port outer) engine. "Both planes burst into flames immediately, the B-17 exploding, disintegrating into several pieces, and crashing to the ground. The P-47 hit the ground in a tight spiral, exploding when it hit the ground." The collision occurred ~5 miles NE of Bruning AAF. The fighter pilot was KWF. The B-17, of the 224th AAF Base Unit, out of Sioux City Army Air Base, Iowa, was part of a formation of bombers on a camera-gunnery mission, en route to Bruning AAF, which was flying in several elements. The fighter struck the wing man of the second element of the low formation. Only four crew of ten aboard the B-17 managed to bail out. Killed were 2d Lts. William F. Washburn, and Bernard I. Hall, pilot and co-pilot, F/O George A. Budovsky, Cpl. John E. Tuchols, and Pvt. Henry C. Sedberry. Surviving were Cpls. LeNoir A. Greer (minor injuries), and Walter A. Divan (major injuries), Pvt. Albert L. Mikels (minor injuries), and Pfc. Reuben L. Larson (minor injuries). "It is the opinion of the Aircraft Accident Investigating Committee that responsibility for the accident is 100% pilot error on the part of the pilot of the P-47, in that poor judgement and poor technique was used in 'breaking-off'." A Nebraska historical marker for the accident was erected in 2010 by the Milligan Memorial Committee for the World War II Fatal Air Crashes near Milligan, Nebraska.

16 September 1944
U.S. Army Air Forces B-17 on its way to England loses altitude due to a severe downdraft and crashes on Eyjafjallajökull in Iceland. All ten crew members survive the crash with minor injuries and are able to escape the partial burning plane but have to stay two days in the wreckage due to a storm before they can hike down the glacier. Six of the crew manage to reach a farm after a 13 hour walk, while four have to spend a night in the open, as they were unable to cross the river of Markarfljót, before getting rescued the day after.

21 November 1944
A B-17G Flying Fortress, 43-38545, sustained damage from flak fire over Merseburg, Saxony-Anhalt, causing two of its engines to fail and a third to be close to doing so; in response, the pilot lowered the bomber's undercarriage and gave the order to bail out. The aircraft continued its flight, gradually descending until it landed in a field in Belgium behind Allied lines, sustaining additional damage to a propeller and a wingtip when a main gear wheel became stuck in the ground, causing the aircraft to spin around until it came to a stop. The crew of a nearby Royal Air Force anti-aircraft gun made their way to the aircraft to offer assistance, only to find it empty. Of the ten crew aboard, nine survived and returned to duty.

25 November 1944
At 15:20, B-17G Flying Fortress, 43-38847, crashed into an old quarry on Titterstone Clee Hill, Shropshire, in low visibility after flying off course. It had taken off in Stansted and was on its way to RAF Langford Lodge, but was off course by some 28 degrees. This took it into the path of the hill, which was at the time shrouded by a sleet storm, with visibility essentially at zero. Despite a last ditch attempt to pull up, the tip of the left wing collided with the quarry, sending the plane cartwheeling into the common atop the hill. Of the six occupants, five died in the crash itself, whilst the final occupant died in an ambulance on the way to Ludlow hospital.

17 January 1945
A B-17 Flying Fortress on a routine training mission crashed in the forest just outside Bay Minette, AL. All 11 crew members were killed in the crash. 1st Lt Sydney Abramson of Dorchester, Mass; 2nd Lt Richard P. Poe of Ada, OK; 2nd Lt Iavn B. Richey of Braymor, MO; 2nd Lt Douglas W. Mallory of Baytown, TX; 2nd Lt Randall A. Weaver of Nashville, TN; Pfc Clayton E. Popper of Yakima, WA; Corp James B. Fleming of Shady Gap, PA; Pfc Georger H. Smith of Porterville, CA; Corp Thomas M. Rutledge of Nashville, TN; Pfc James C. White of Wichita Falls, TX and Pfc John R. Makfei of San Francisco, CA.:

3 March 1945

B-17G Flying Fortress, 44-83325, fresh off the production line, crashed into Beinn Edra, on the Isle of Skye, Scotland. On ferrying flight from Long Beach, California via Bangor, Maine, Meeks Field, Iceland, and RAF Valley, Anglesey, Wales to Gioia del Colle Air Base in Italy. Got disorientated in low lying cloud after passing over the Outer Hebrides, and slammed into the east face of Beinn Edra whilst on an east-west heading trying to regain bearings, killing all 9 crewmen instantly. Crew are memorialised on the war memorial in the nearby village of Staffin.

23 April 1945

B-17G-95-BO, 43-38856, 'GD-M', of the 381st Bombardment Group (Heavy), crashed into the east facing slope of North Barrule in the Isle of Man killing 31 US service personnel (2 crew and 29 passengers) en route to Belfast for a week's leave. A memorial plaque was placed at the crash site in June 1995.

5 August 1945
A TB-17G, built as a B-17G-70-BO, 43-37700, of the 325th Combat Crew Training Squadron, Avon Park Army Airfield, Florida, crashes six miles S of Ridgeland, South Carolina, after the number 2 (port inner) engine catches fire at 10,000 feet during a flight from Stewart Field, New York, to its home base in Florida. Pilot Lieutenant Dewey O. Jones orders the crew to abandon ship. An announcement released by the Hunter Field, Georgia, public relations office states that five parachuted safely, three were killed, and that two other men were missing. Listed as fatalities are Flight Officer Alfred Ponessa, of Newburgh, New York, a passenger, Sergeant Leo B. Bucharia, of Long Island, New York, and Technical Sergeant Edwin S. Salas, of Haverhill, Massachusetts, both members of the crew. The missing were listed as Lieutenant William Cherry and Corporal Sidney Podhoretz (addresses not available). The names of the other four survivors were not given.

9 July 1946

Eight USAAF crew, 16 U.S. Coast Guardsmen, returning from duty in Greenland, and one civilian are killed when the B-17G-105-BO, 43-39136, c/n 10114, they are flying in crashes into Mount Tom, Massachusetts, at ~2220 hrs. while attempting to land at Westover Field, Massachusetts. A monument to the victims was dedicated on the crash site on 6 July 1996.

14 January 1947
B-17G-95-VE, 44-85588, of the Flight Test Division, Air Materiel Command, Wright Field, Ohio, crashes through a rain-soaked swamp thicket, cutting a 500-yard swath through the underbrush, rams a tree and burns at ~1810 hrs., coming down ~3 miles NE of Fairfield, and ~3 miles NW of Patterson Field, where the pilot apparently intended to land. The crash, coming at the end of a routine test flight to Lawson Field, Fort Benning, Georgia, and return, kills three crew and leaves one injured. Dead are Maj. Walter L. Massengill of Dayton, the pilot; Master Sgt. Lee P. Hartman, engineer, and Warrant Officer Benedict F. Jacquay. The injured crewman is Lt. Marvin C. Rice, copilot. Other home towns were unavailable, said Wright Field officials.

15 August 1947
B-17H, 43-39473, with 10th Air Rescue Squadron, built as a B-17G-110-BO, crashes after takeoff ~2 miles from Fort Randall Army Airfield, Cold Bay, Alaska, this date, killing all eight on board. Pilot was Marion E. Calender. Some wreckage still there.

24 December 1947
B-17G-95-DL, 44-83790, of the 1385th Base Unit, Bluie West One, Greenland, delivering presents and mail to isolated outposts on Baffin Bay, runs out of fuel on Christmas Eve and pilot Chester M. Karney makes a forced landing on snow-laden frozen Dyke Lake in Labrador. None of the nine aboard are injured and they are picked up on 26 December by a ski and JATO-equipped Douglas C-47. Officers at Atlantic Division headquarters of Air Transport Command, Westover Air Force Base, Massachusetts, said that a snowstorm earlier in the day delayed one flight by the C-47 to fetch the seven crew and two passengers off the ice and that they had prepared to spend a third night in the sub-zero temperatures. But a successful rescue was achieved and the marooned flown 275 miles to Goose Bay. Fortress abandoned and sinks to the bottom of lake. Aircraft located in July 1998; recovered from the lake on 9 September 2004. Now under restoration to fly at Douglas, Georgia.

30 January 1948
A Boeing B-17 Flying Fortress, searching for a Douglas C-47 that went missing on 27 January in France, spots the downed transport on a mountainside, and then itself crashes and burns. Only one member of the ten crew survives, Sgt. Angelo LaSalle, of Des Moines, Iowa. He is aided by a former Luftwaffe pilot, Horst Kupski, a prisoner-of-war working for a French farmer, who lends him garments and helps him down the mountain.

5 November 1948
DB-17G, 44-83678, returning to Eglin AFB, Florida, from Fort Wayne, Indiana, crashes in woods SE of Auxiliary Field 2, Pierce Field due to pilot error, crashing and burning NE of the runway at Eglin main base early Friday. All five on board were killed, including Lt. Col. Frederick W. Eley, 43, of Shalimar, Florida, staff judge advocate at Eglin for nearly three years – he was returning from his grandmother's funeral in Portland, Indiana; Maj. Bydie J. Nettles, 29, who lived in Shalimar, Florida, but was originally from Pensacola, Florida, group adjutant for the 3203rd Maintenance and Supply section; Capt. Robert LeMar, 31, Ben's Lake, Eglin AFB, test pilot with the 3203rd; crew chief M/Sgt. Carl LeMieux, 31, of Milton, Florida; and Sgt. William E. Bazer, 36, assistant engineer, Destin, Florida. Bazer's wife was the Eglin base librarian.

== 1950s ==
16 October 1950
A QB-17G, 44-83565, of the 3200th Drone Squadron, piloted by Emerson N. Hixson, is involved in a ground accident at Eglin AFB, Florida, due to weather, receiving moderate damage.
8 November 1950
SB-17G, 43-39364, of the 3d Air Rescue Squadron, is heavily damaged while parked when struck by SB-17G, 43-39365, of the same unit, at Ashiya Air Base, Japan, when its hydraulics failed. The noses of both are wrecked and both are written off.
1 November 1951
44-83699 is subjected to the Easy shot of the Operation Buster–Jangle atomic weapons tests as a ground target.
19 January 1952
SB-17G, 44-85746, built as B-17G-105-VE, accepted May 1945, based at McChord AFB, Washington, returning from a search and rescue mission, strikes a ridge near Tyler Peak on the Olympic peninsula, killing 3 crew, 5 survive. Wreckage is still there.
11 July 1952
Seven of eight crew survive the crash landing of a Boeing SB-17 Flying Fortress, of the 10th Air Rescue Squadron at Anchorage, Alaska, when it fails to return from a search for an RCAF bomber, missing since 30 June with four aboard. The Fortress had apparently completed its six hour search sweep and was en route to Whitehorse when it crashed. The last radio message, shortly before noon, stated that they were over their search area in fair to good weather. The hunt for the B-17 began at 2015 hrs. when it had not returned by fuel exhaustion limits. An amphibian sighted the downed plane in the night and dropped food and sleeping bags. American parachutists jumped to the downed crew's aid on 12 July and three helicopters - two American and one Canadian - began moving survivors to Snag, Yukon territory, about 30 miles SW of the crash site. A seriously burned crewman was ferried by C-47 to Elmendorf Air Force Hospital at Anchorage. Two other survivors were not as seriously injured.

25 August 1952
An Eglin Air Force Base DB-17G Flying Fortress drone control ship, 44-83680, built as a B-17G-90-DL, is accidentally shot down by F-86D-1-NA Sabre, 50-469, of the 3200th Proof Test Group, flown by Colonel Arthur R. DeBolt, 39, of Columbus, Ohio. Colonel Mac McWhorter was piloting the mother ship with a QB-17 drone in trail over the Gulf of Mexico for a radar-controlled approach by the jet fighter, "which by mistake fired a rocket that sent a B-17 bomber spinning into flames into the Gulf of Mexico. Six of eight crewmen on the bomber may have been killed. The Air Force said the pilot, DeBolt, apparently mistook the B-17 mother" [sic] plane for a radio-controlled drone during a test operation. Col. DeBolt was overcome with grief by the tragic error." Two enlisted crewmen were plucked from the Gulf by USS Seer after 24 hours in a life raft on 26 August. Building 100 on the Eglin flightline is named the Audette Airborne Systems Building. A dedication plaque at the front entrance reads: "In memory of Lieutenant Colonel Leo R. Audette, United States Air Force – in recognition of his contribution in the development of airborne electronics systems – who on 25 August 1952, while a member of this command, gave his life while participating in operations which advanced the development of these systems."
4 January 1953
A VB-17G, 44-85576, of the 6600th Air Base Unit, Pepperrell AFB, St. Johns, Newfoundland, Canada, piloted by Joseph H. Huau Jr., suffers moderate damage during a landing accident at Bolling AFB, Washington, D.C., due to mechanical failure.
26 August 1953
U.S. Coast Guard PB-1G Flying Fortress, BuNo 77253, ex-44-85827, loses brakes while landing at NAS Sand Point, near Seattle, Washington, overruns runway, crushes nose as it ends up in Lake Washington. Retrieved and sold for salvage.
26 May 1954
A Republic of China Air Force B-17 crashed near Fujian, People's Republic of China. "Pilot Nie Jing Yuan, four crew members and four agents that were to be airdropped, were all killed. The People's Republic of China did not make a claim to have shot the aircraft down, so it might have suffered an accident."
26 June 1956
An F-89H Scorpion downed a remote-controlled target QB-17 Flying Fortress over the Eglin water ranges with a Hughes GAR-1 Falcon, "the first time the missile has been employed to destroy a target ship in a simulated air defense environment." Lt. Col. Louis E. Andre Jr., from the 3241st Test Group, Interceptor, of APGC and his radar observer, Squadron Leader George T. E. Richards of the Royal Air Force, were credited with the kill. The Falcon is designed to be launched by the F-89H and the F-102A Delta Dagger interceptors. "The missile as well as the Scorpion and the F-102A are presently undergoing operational suitability testing at the Air Force Operational Test Center."
30 June 1956
An F-102A Delta Dagger downed a remotely controlled QB-17 Flying Fortress over the Eglin water ranges with a Hughes GAR-1 Falcon on this date, announced Air Proving Ground Commander Maj. Gen. Robert W. Burns, the second drone to fall prey to the air-to-air missile within a week at the APGC.
1 November 1956
A third QB-17 drone kill was achieved by a Hughes GAR-1 Falcon fired from a F-102A Delta Dagger of the 3201st Test Group (Interceptor), flown by Maj. Robert T. Goetz on this date over the Eglin water ranges. The drone had been previously damaged by an earlier hit during the same mission, fired by Capt. William T. Quirk. Goetz had been credited with one of the two QB-17 kills during June 1956.

== 1960s ==
29 August 1967
B-17G-95-DL, 44-83857, later PB-1W, BuNo 77226, to civil register as N7228C. Destroyed in crash at 0927 hrs. at Kalispell, Montana, while in use as a fire bomber, after making wheels-up landing due to smoke in the cockpit, killing two crew according to one source, no fatalities according to an NTSB report, which seems more credible as the co-pilot reported that the fire began in the accessory section of the number three (starboard inner) engine. Jettisoned load before touch down.

== 1970s ==
18 August 1970
B-17F-50-VE, 42-6107, c/n 6403, to TB-17F, to civil register as N1340N. Reengined with Rolls-Royce Dart turboprops in 1969. Crashed at 1637 hrs. during fire bomber run while operated by Aero Flite on down slope side of mountain near Dubois, Wyoming, with density altitude of ~13,000 feet, winds of 25-35 mph, updrafts and downdrafts. Pilot misjudged altitude and clearance, failed to maintain flight speed, aircraft stalled and struck trees. Two crew killed.
12 July 1971
B-17G-85-DL, 44-83542, c/n 32183, civil registration N9324Z, operated as fire bomber 'C18' or 'E18' by Aero Union Corp. Crashed near Benson, Arizona, while fighting a fire in the Whetstone Mountains; both crew survived. NTSB report cites partial power loss due to air intake issue. Note: this plane is on display at Fantasy of Flight in Polk City, Florida, as 42-37994 "Piccadilly Princess."
12 July 1972
B-17G-95-DL, 44-83864, c/n 32505, later to PB-1W, BuNo 77232, registered successively N6465D, N5234V, XB-BOE, and finally N73648, operated as a fire bomber 'E56' by Black Hills Aviation. Destroyed 20 mi SW of Socorro, New Mexico, when the pilot misjudged his altitude during his second slurry drop and struck trees at 1605 hrs., killing two crew.
12 July 1973
B-17G-110-VE, 44-85840, c/n 8749, to Bolivian registry with Lloyd Aero Boliviano, November 1956, as CP-620, back to U.S. in 1968 with Aircraft Specialties, Inc. of Mesa, Arizona, as N620L. Used in 1970 film Tora! Tora! Tora! Crashed near Elko, Nevada, during fire bomber run, updrafts and downdrafts, 40 knot winds. Following steep turn downwind over downslope of mountain, pilot failed to maintain airspeed, stalled, two crew killed.
5 August 1976
B-17G-110-VE, 44-85812, later PB-1G, BuNo 77246, to civil register as N4710C and used for fire ant spraying by Dothan Aviation, destroyed in accident near Rochelle, Georgia. NTSB report gives cause as fire in or near carburetor, forcing emergency landing at 0815 hrs., airframe burned. Another source cites crash site as Blakely, Georgia.

== 1980s ==
23 August 1987
B-17G-85-DL, 44-83575, registered N93012, operated by the Collings Foundation, was caught by crosswinds during a landing at Beaver County Airport near Pittsburgh. Landing too far down the runway, the plane rolled off the end of runway, crashed through a fence and power pole, and came to rest down a 100-foot (30 m) ravine. Various damage including landing gear, wings, and fuselage. There were no fatalities, however three of the twelve people on board were injured. Note: this plane was later destroyed in an accident on 2 October 2019.

25 July 1989
B-17G-100-VE, 44-85643, c/n 8552, F-BEEA, of the Institut géographique national (IGN), destroyed when it hit a tree and a pile of gravel during takeoff at RAF Binbrook, United Kingdom, during filming of Memphis Belle. Aircraft destroyed by fire, but ten on board managed to escape. This airframe had been the camera ship during filming of Dr. Strangelove in 1964, whose shadow makes an accidental cameo on the arctic ice pack below the B-52 Stratofortress attacking Russia.

== 2010s ==
13 June 2011
B-17G-105-VE, 44-85734, registered N390TH, previously N5111N, named Liberty Belle and operated by the Liberty Foundation of Tulsa, Oklahoma, as a flying history exhibit, suffered an in-flight fire in port wing behind #2 engine while on a positioning flight from Aurora, Illinois, to Indianapolis, Indiana. The crew made an emergency landing in a field near Oswego, Illinois, 20 minutes after takeoff. Three crew and four passengers escaped safely before fire consumed the airframe and all seven people survived without injuries. BREAKING NEWS: "A B-17 Flying Fortress that dates back to World War 2 crashed and burned on Monday morning in a cornfield outside Chicago." Aviation Officials Said.

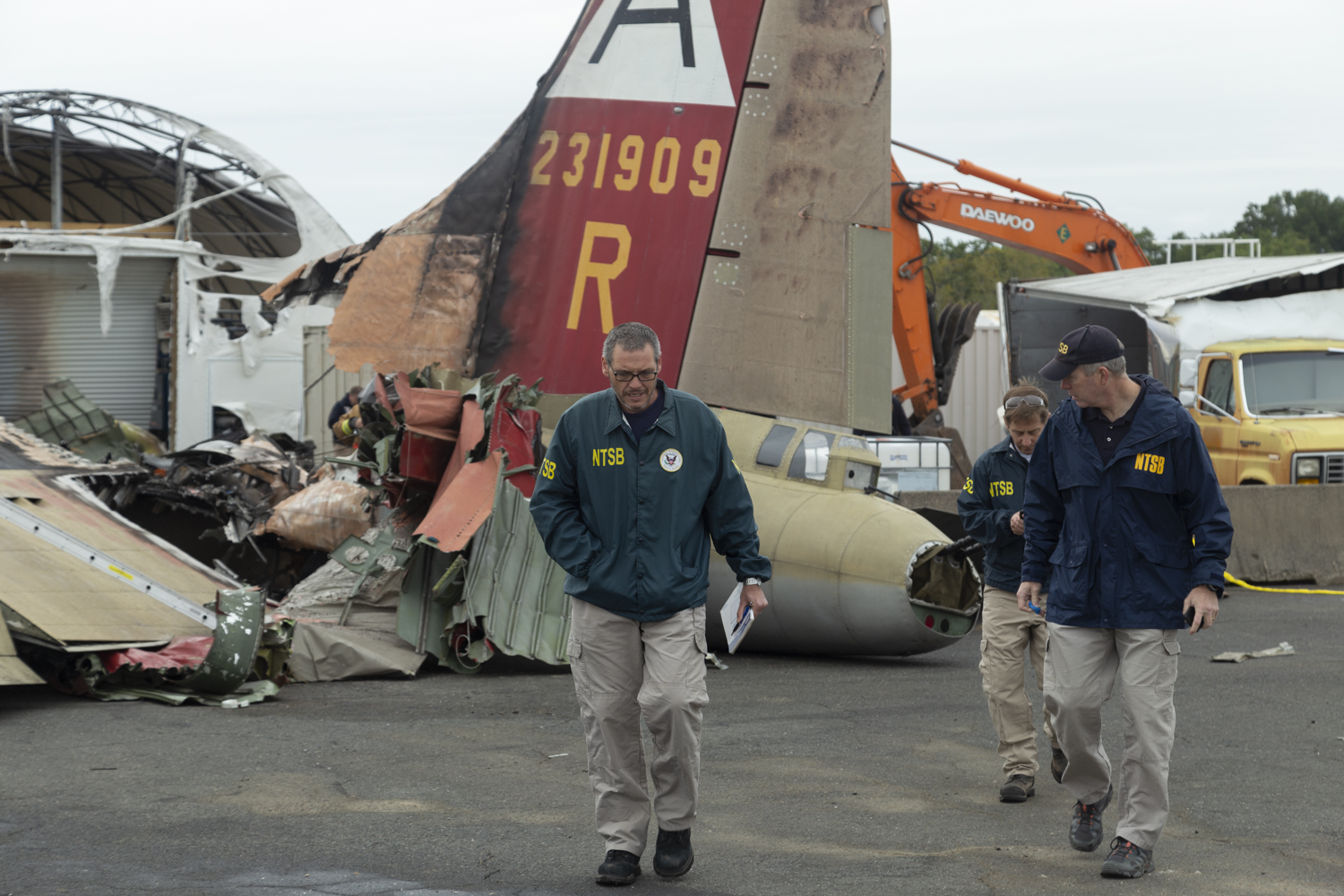
NTSB investigators at the B-17 crash at Bradley International Airport

2 October 2019

B-17G-85-DL, 44-83575, registered N93012, named Nine-O-Nine and operated by the Collings Foundation, crashed at Bradley International Airport in Windsor Locks, Connecticut. Three crew and 10 passengers were onboard at the time; there were seven fatalities. The NTSB investigation cited pilot error as the likely cause.

== 2020s ==
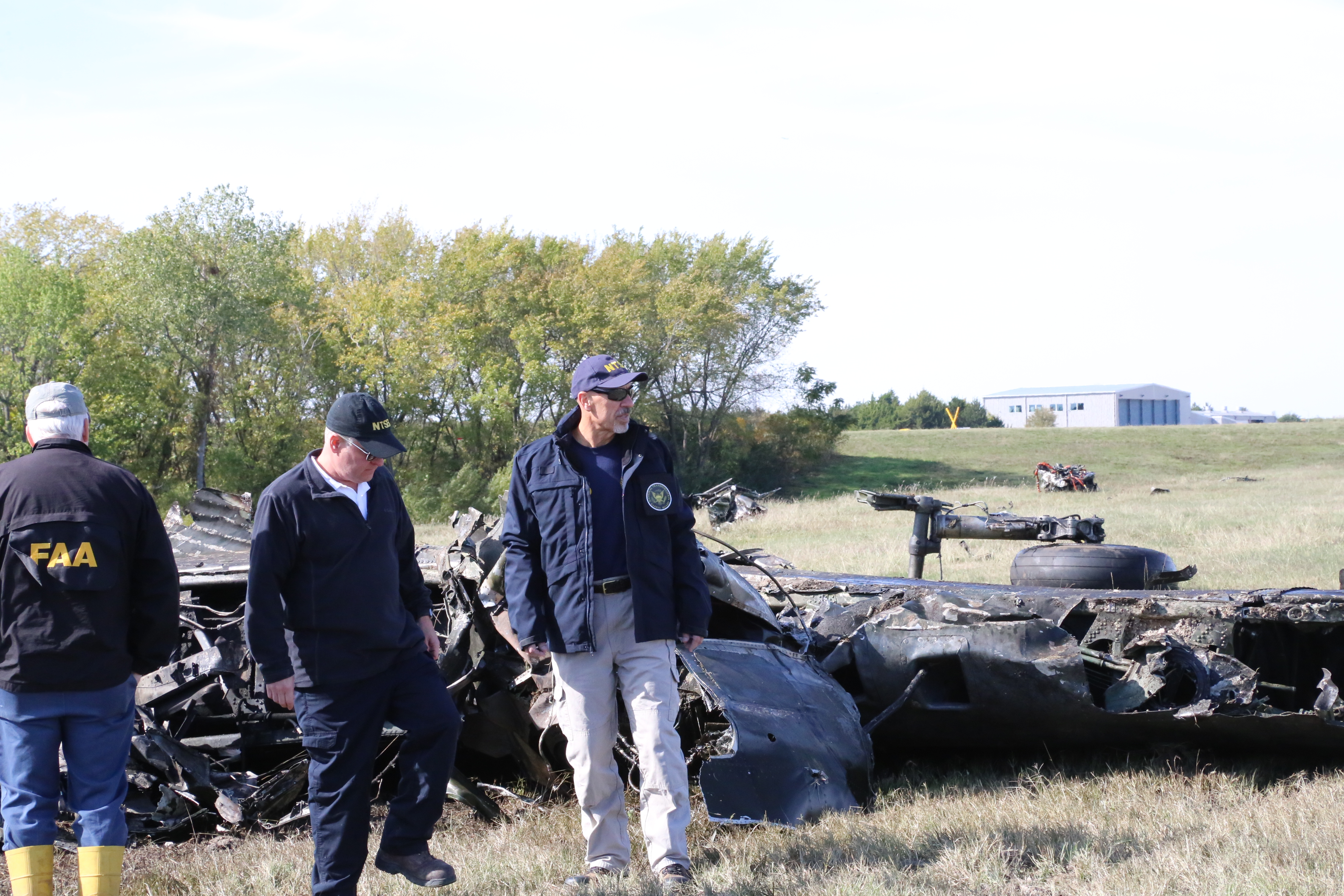
FAA and NTSB personnel at the Dallas crash site.

12 November 2022

B-17G-95-DL 44-83872, registered N7227C, named Texas Raiders, had a mid-air collision with a Bell P-63 Kingcobra, registered N6763, at the Dallas Executive Airport while performing during the Wings Over Dallas airshow. The P-63 overtook the B-17 on a descending trajectory during low-level maneuvers and impacted the aircraft from the port side, at a point just above and aft of the B-17's wings. The tail section of Texas Raiders was severed from the rest of the aircraft due to the collision and both aircraft were destroyed in the resulting impact with the ground. Six people were killed in the collision, the entire crew of five on board the B-17, as well as the pilot of the P-63. No one was injured on the ground.

== See also ==
- List of surviving Boeing B-17 Flying Fortresses
