= List of British Aerospace Jetstream operators =

In July 2016, 101 British Aerospace Jetstream were in airline service : 75 in Americas, 15 in Europe, 7 in Asia Pacific & Middle East and 4 in Africa; its airline operators with five or more aircraft were :

- 10: SARPA
- 8: Northwestern Air
- 5: Pascan Aviation, Transmandu, FlyPelican and Aerolíneas Sosa

== Current civil operators ==
- Armenia
  - Sky Net Airline
- Bahamas
  - Southern Air Charter
- Canada
  - Pascan Aviation
- Chile
  - AeroEjecutiva
- Colombia
  - SARPA
- Haiti
  - Sunrise Airways
- Mexico
  - Aero Pacífico
- Peru
  - Servicios Aéreos Tarapoto

== Former civil operators ==
- Argentina
  - Aerovip
- Australia
  - Eastern Australia Airlines
- Haiti
  - Salsa d'Haïti
- Honduras
  - Aerolínea Lanhsa
- Jamaica
  - Skylan Airways
- Japan
  - J-Air
- New Zealand
  - Air National
- United Kingdom
  - Brymon European Airways
- United States
  - Air New Orleans
  - North Pacific Airlines (as United Express for United Airlines)

== Military operators ==
- Bolivia:
  - Bolivian Air Force
- United Kingdom
  - Royal Navy - Fleet Air Arm (retired 2011)
    - 750 Naval Air Squadron

== Gallery ==
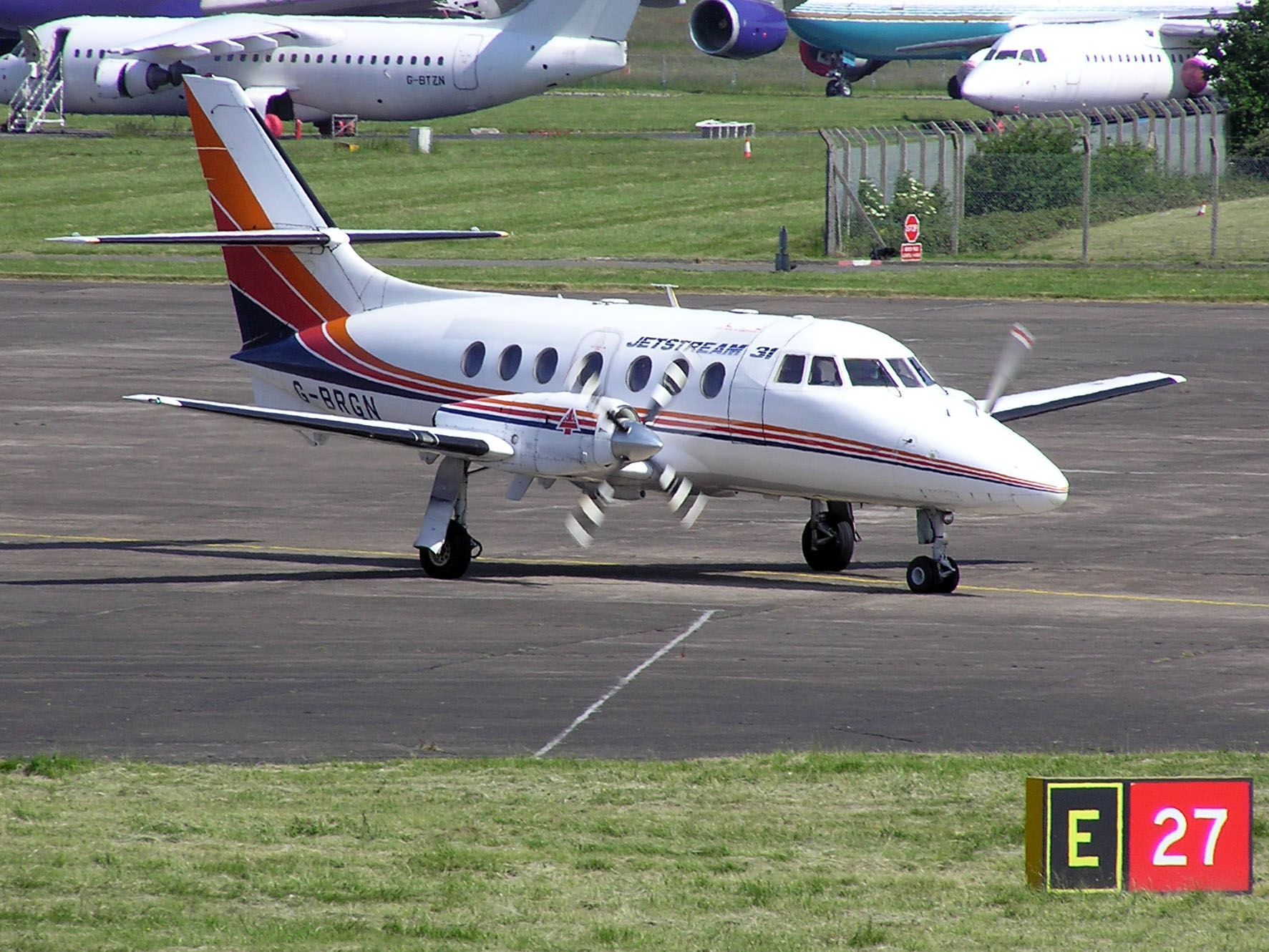
Jetstream 31 operated by Cranfield University at Filton Airfield in 2005

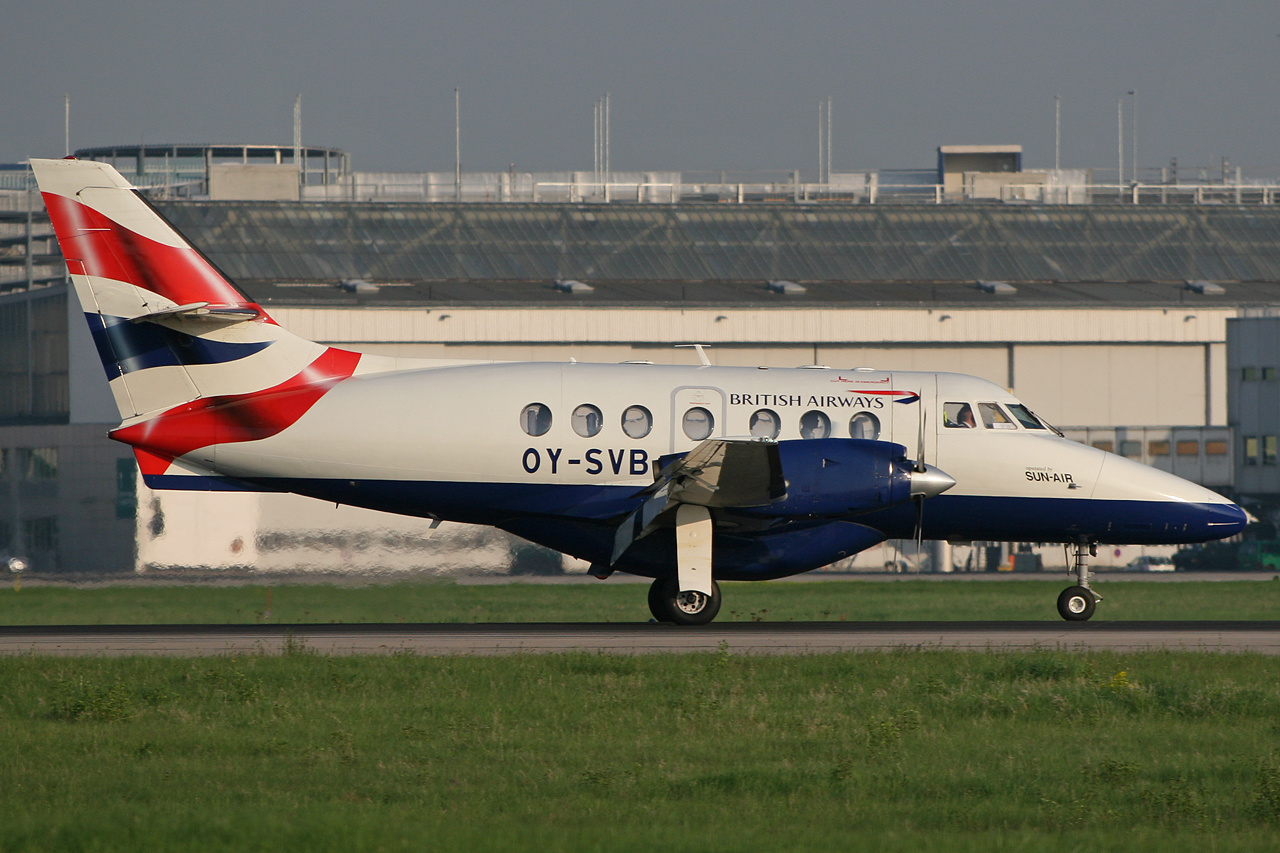
Jetstream 32 operated by Sun Air of Scandinavia in British Airways livery

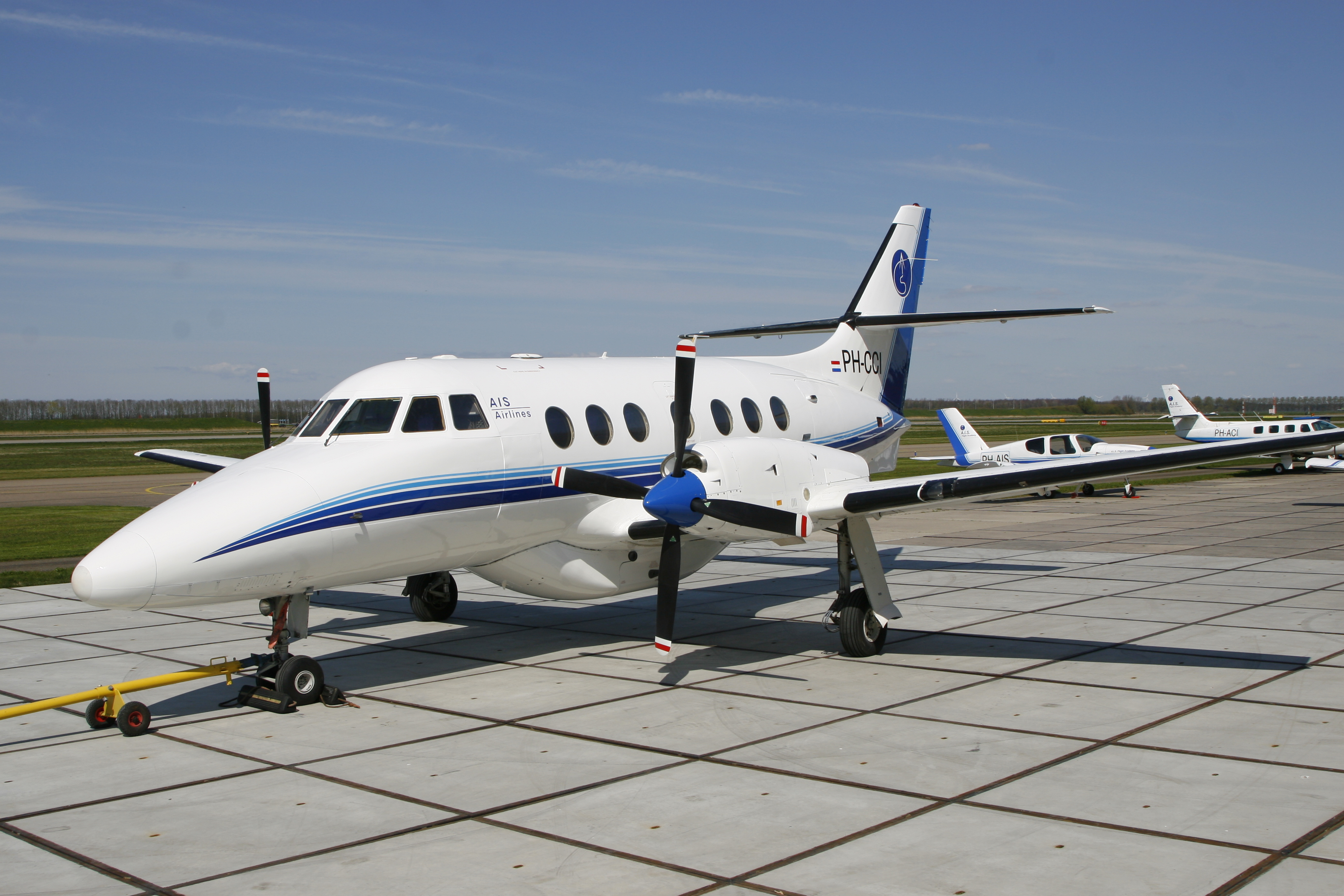
A Jetstream 32 from AIS Airlines at Lelystad Airport

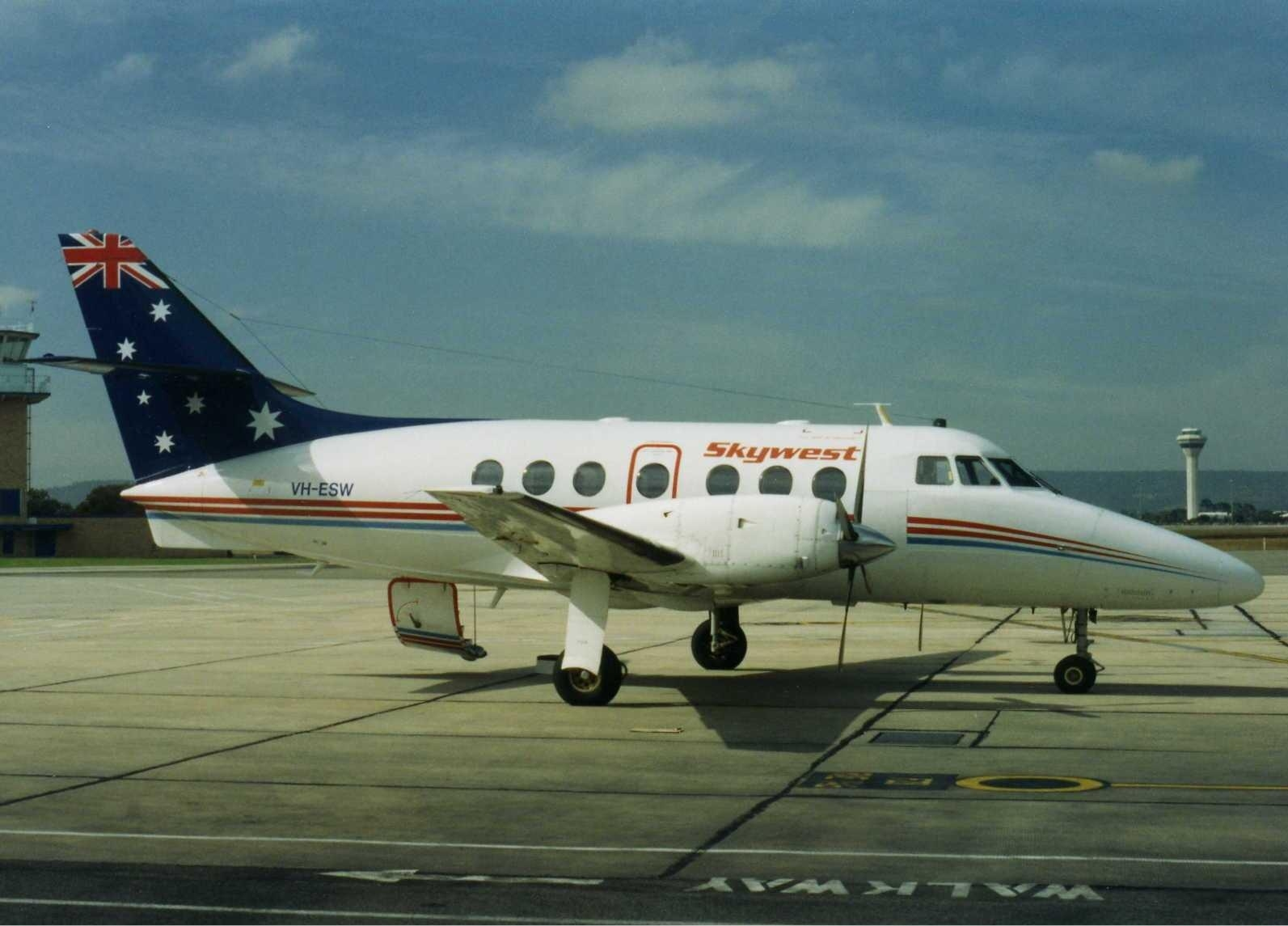
Skywest Airlines J31 at Perth Airport (early 1990s)

== Bibliography ==
- Thetford, Owen (1991). British Naval Aircraft since 1912. London, UK: Putnam Aeronautical Books, an imprint of Conway Maritime Press Ltd. ISBN 0-85177-849-6.
