= Graah Fjord =

Fjord in Greenland

- Devold Fjord, Langenæs Fjord
- Akorninnarmiit Oqqummut Kangertivat (Greenlandic)
- Location in Greenland
- Location: Arctic
- Coordinates: 63°24′N 41°17′W
- Ocean/sea sources: North Atlantic Ocean
- Basin countries: Greenland
- Max. length: 20 kilometres (12 miles)
- Max. width: 2 kilometres (1.2 miles)
- Settlements: Finnsbu (abandoned)

Graah Fjord, also known as Devold Fjord and Langenæs Fjord, is a fjord in King Frederick VI Coast, eastern Greenland.

Administratively it is part of the Sermersooq municipality.

== History ==
There are remains of ancient Inuit settlements of the southern group in Imaarsivik, a coastal island at the entrance of the fjord.

The fjord was named after Arctic explorer Wilhelm August Graah of the Danish Navy, who was the first to map this area of the coast of Greenland during an 1828–31 expedition in search of the legendary Eastern Norse Settlement.

Finnsbu was a Norwegian weather and radio station opened on the shore of the fjord by Finn Devold on behalf of the Arctic Trading Co. Devold had first chosen a site in Timmiarmiut Fjord when he arrived in 1932 on Ship Heimen from Tromsø, but then moved to this site to establish the station. The station was abandoned in 1933.

During WWII, on 9 April 1944, a Boeing B-17 Flying Fortress crashed in the fjord. Attempts by aircraft recovery expert Gary Larkins to locate the airframe have been unsuccessful.

== Geography ==
To the southeast the Graah Fjord opens into the Irminger Sea of the North Atlantic Ocean. It extends about 20 kilometres (12 miles) in a roughly SE/NW direction and separates two narrow peninsulas in southeastern Thorland. The fjord is entered between Cape Langenaes to the south and the 300 metres (980 feet) high coastal island (or peninsula) of Imaarsivik to the north. A good small harbour, named Graahs Havn, is located west of the island.

The fjord has a branch named Jaette Fjord on its NE shore, opening 12.5 kilometres (7.8 miles) from the mouth and extending 17 kilometres (11 miles) to the NNW. Finnsbu, the former Norwegian meteorological and radio station, was located on the southwestern shore of the fjord, about 11 kilometres (6.8 miles) northwest of Cape Langenaes.

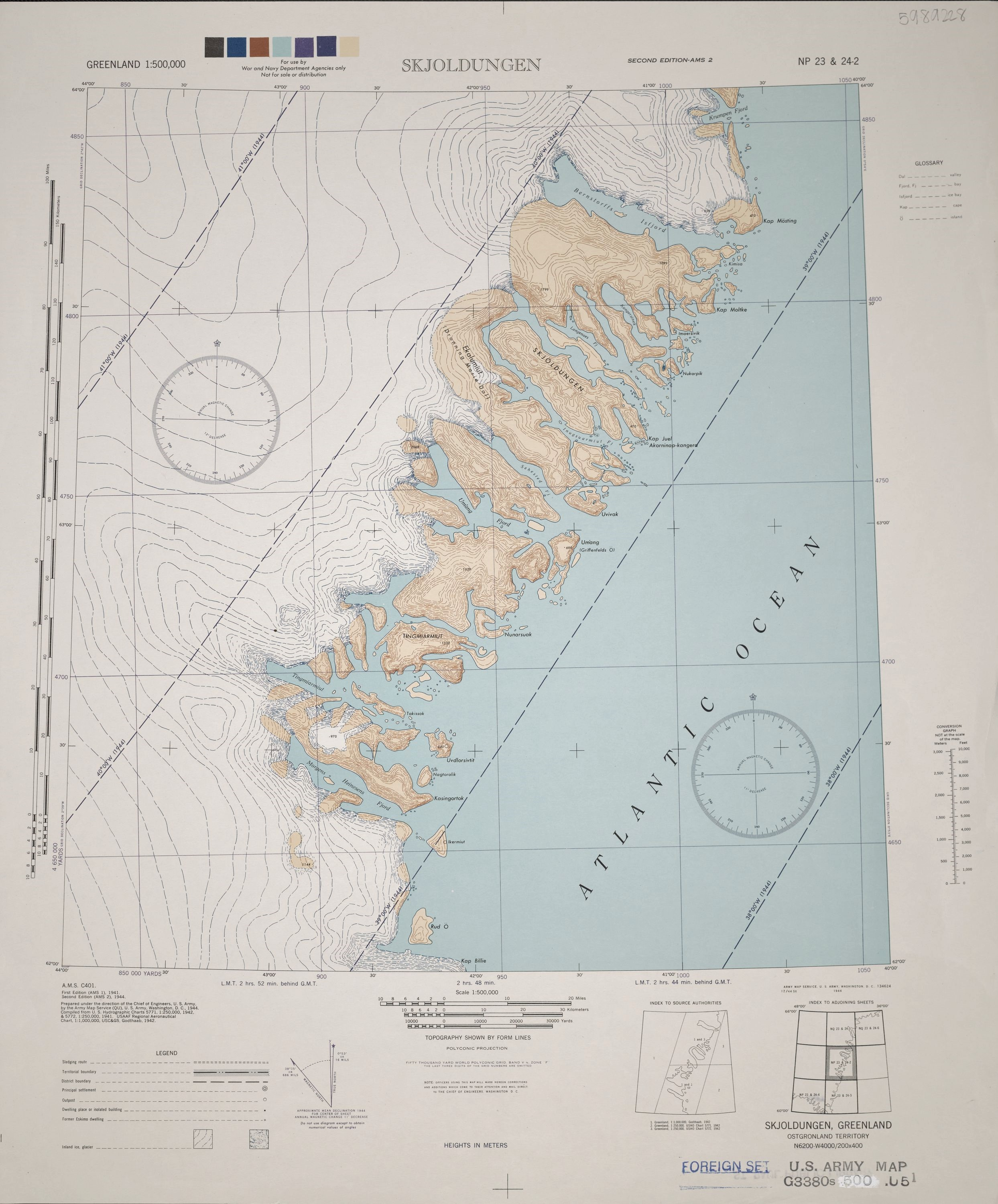
1944 map of the area around Skjoldungen with the Thorland Peninsula just north of the island.

== See also ==
- List of fjords of Greenland
- Accidents and incidents involving the Boeing B-17 Flying Fortress

== Bibliography ==
- Spencer Apollonio, Lands That Hold One Spellbound: A Story of East Greenland, 2008
