= 308th Air Refueling Squadron =

Inactive US Air Force unit

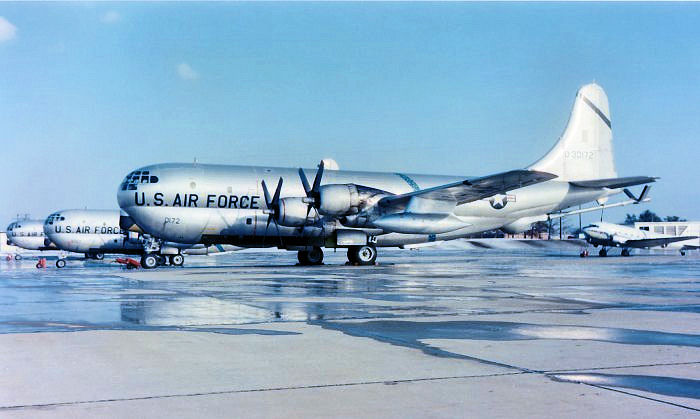
- Strategic Air Command KC-97 Stratofreighters
- Active: 1942–1944; 1945–1946; 1953–1960
- Country: United States
- Branch: United States Air Force
- Role: Air refueling
- Motto: Extendere Potentia (Latin for 'Extend Power')
- Decorations: Air Force Outstanding Unit Award

Insignia
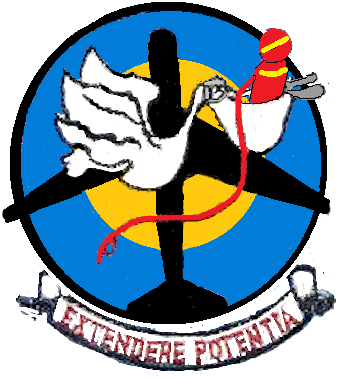
- 308th Air Refueling Squadron emblem

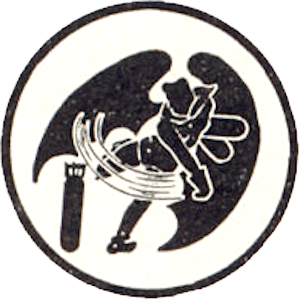
- 318th Bombardment Squadron emblem (Note: Approved 4 May 1943. Description: on a white disc, border black, a winged male silhouette figure black in flight, hurling aerial bomb earthward with right hand and holding two aerial bombs under left arm.)

The 308th Air Refueling Squadron is an inactive United States Air Force unit. It was stationed at Hunter Air Force Base, Georgia, where it conducted air refueling operations from 1953 to 1960. It earned an Air Force Outstanding Unit Award for participating in a test of ground alert for Strategic Air Command.

The first predecessor of the squadron was the 318th Bombardment Squadron, which served as an Operational Training Unit and later as a Replacement Training Unit from 1942 until 1944, when it was disbanded in a general reorganization of Army Air Forces training and support units in the United States. In 1945, the squadron's second predecessor, the 8th Tactical Reconnaissance Squadron was activated as a demonstration unit for air ground support exercises. It was inactivated the following year. In 1985, these squadrons were consolidated into a single unit.

== History ==
=== World War II training unit ===
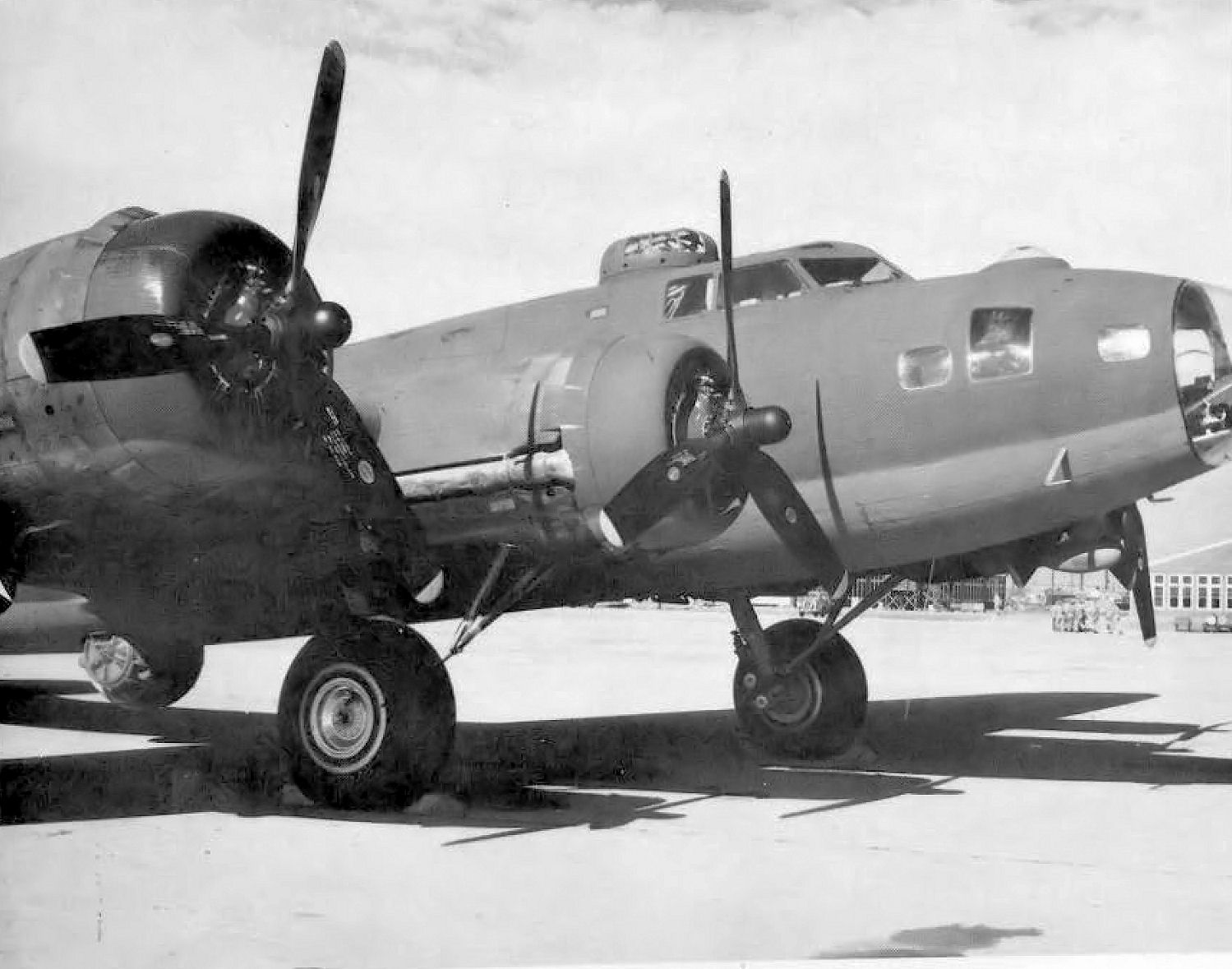
A B-17 Flying Fortress at a US training base

The first predecessor of the squadron was activated at Salt Lake City Army Air Base, Utah in July 1942 as the 318th Bombardment Squadron, one of the four squadrons of the 88th Bombardment Group. In September, the squadron moved to Geiger Field, Washington, where it began to receive its initial manning and Boeing B-17 Flying Fortresses. The following month, it moved to Rapid City Army Air Field, South Dakota, where it began operating as an Operational Training Unit (OTU). The OTU program involved the use of an oversized parent unit to provide cadres to "satellite groups" The OTU program was patterned after the unit training system of the Royal Air Force. The parent unit assumed responsibility for satellite unit training and oversaw their expansion with graduates of Army Air Forces Training Command schools to become effective combat units. Phase I training concentrated on individual training in crewmember specialties. Phase II training emphasized the coordination for the crew to act as a team. The final phase concentrated on operation as a unit.

The squadron's time as an OTU was brief, for in November it moved to Walla Walla Army Air Field, Washington, where it became a Replacement Training Unit (RTU). Like OTUs, RTUs were oversized units, but their mission was to train individual pilots or aircrews. In November 1943, as Second Air Force prepared to concentrate on Boeing B-29 Superfortress training, the squadron moved to Avon Park Army Air Field, Florida, where it became part of Third Air Force. However, standard military units, based on relatively inflexible tables of organization were proving not well adapted to the training mission. Accordingly, the Army Air Forces adopted a more functional system in which each base was organized into a separate numbered unit. In this reorganization the 318th was replaced along with other units at Avon Park by the 325th AAF Base Unit (Replacement Training, Bombardment, Heavy) and was inactivated.

=== Air demonstration unit ===
This unit is not the same unit as the 8th Tactical Reconnaissance Squadron, which is currently active as the 8th Flying Training Squadron.

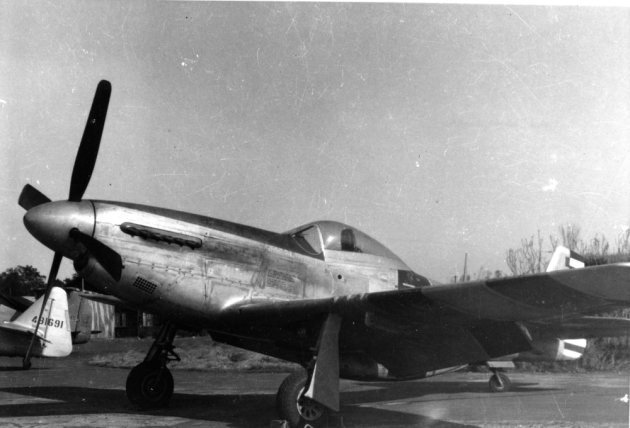
North American F-6 Mustang

Shortly before the end of World War II, in July 1945, the squadron's second predecessor, the 8th Tactical Reconnaissance Squadron was activated at Stuttgart Army Air Field, Arkansas and assigned to the 74th Tactical Reconnaissance Group. The squadron was equipped with Curtiss P-40 Warhawks and both the North American P-51 and F-6 models of the Mustang, It served as a demonstration unit for air ground support exercises in the early postwar era. In November 1945, the 74th Group was inactivated and the squadron was reassigned to the 69th Reconnaissance Group, which moved to Stuttgart on paper and absorbed the 74th's resources. The squadron moved to Brooks Field with the 69th Group in December and was inactivated there in February 1946. It was disbanded in October 1948.

=== Air refueling unit ===
The 308th Air Refueling Squadron, Medium was activated in July 1953 at Hunter Air Force Base, Georgia to provide air refueling, primarily for the Boeing B-47 Stratojet aircraft of its parent 308th Bombardment Wing using Boeing KC-97 Stratofreighters. In 1954, the squadron refueled wing B-47s on a nonstop simulated attack on a target in Europe from its home base. For this operation, the 308th Wing was awarded the MacKay Trophy.

The squadron conducted several deployments in the early 1950s, deploying detachments to Sidi Slimane and Ben Guerir Air Bases, Morocco, and as a unit to Sidi Slimane from August to September 1956. Between 1 June and 24 June 1954, it deployed to Goose Air Base, Newfoundland to augment the 40th Air Refueling Squadron. It also gave air refueling support to other Strategic Air Command wings deploying to overseas bases.

Concerned by the threat of a surprise attack by the Soviet Union, Strategic Air Command conducted Operation Try Out at Hunter starting in November 1956 and continuing through March 1957. In this test of alert operations, the squadron maintained one third of its aircraft on alert. The squadron earned an Air Force Outstanding Unit Award for its performance in this test. Following the operation's success, the squadron began maintaining aircraft on alert starting in October 1957. In 1959 the 308th was reassigned to the 2d Bombardment Wing at Hunter when the 308th Bombardment Wing became non-operational. It was discontinued in March 1960.

The three units were consolidated in 1985 as the 308th Air Refueling Squadron but have not been active since.

== Lineage ==
318th Bombardment Squadron

- Constituted as the 318th Bombardment Squadron (Heavy) on 28 January 1942

Activated on 15 June 1942
Inactivated on 1 May 1944

- Consolidated on 19 September 1985 with 8th Tactical Reconnaissance Squadron and 308th Air Refueling Squadron as 308th Air Refueling Squadron, Heavy (remained inactive)

8th Tactical Reconnaissance Squadron

- Constituted as the 8th Tactical Reconnaissance Squadron on 30 June 1945

Activated on 15 July 1945
Inactivated on 3 February 1946

- Disbanded on 8 October 1948
- Reconstituted on 19 September 1985 and consolidated with 308th Air Refueling Squadron and 318th Bombardment Squadron as 308th Air Refueling Squadron, Heavy (remained inactive)

308th Air Refueling Squadron

- Constituted as the 308th Air Refueling Squadron, Medium on 15 April 1953

Activated on 8 July 1953
Inactivated on 1 March 1960

- Consolidated on 19 September 1985 with 8th Tactical Reconnaissance Squadron and 318th Bombardment Squadron as 308th Air Refueling Squadron, Heavy (remained inactive)

=== Assignments ===
- 88th Bombardment Group, 15 July 1942 – 1 May 1944
- 74th Tactical Reconnaissance Group, 15 July 1945
- 69th Reconnaissance Group, 7 November 1945 – 3 February 1946
- 308th Bombardment Wing, 8 July 1953 (detached 1–21 June 1954, 5 January – 4 March 1956, 2 April – 2 July 1958)
- 38th Air Division, 15 June 1959
- 2d Bombardment Wing, 1 July 1959 – 1 March 1960

=== Stations ===
- Salt Lake City Army Air Base, Utah, 15 June 1942
- Geiger Field, Washington, 1 September 1942
- Walla Walla Army Air Field, Washington, 21 September 1942
- Rapid City Army Air Field, South Dakota, 28 October 1942
- Walla Walla Army Air Field, Washington, 26 November 1942
- Redmond Army Air Field, Oregon, December 1942
- Walla Walla Army Air Field, Washington, February 1943
- Redmond Army Air Field, Oregon, c. October 1943
- Avon Park Army Air Field, Florida, c. 9 November 1943 – 1 May 1944
- Stuttgart Army Air Field, Arkansas, 15 July 1945
- Brooks Field, Texas, 10 December 1945 – 3 February 1946
- Hunter Air Force Base, Georgia, 8 July 1953 – 1 March 1960

=== Aircraft ===
- Boeing B-17 Flying Fortress, 1942–1944
- Curtiss P-40 Warhawk, 1945
- North American P-51 Mustang
- North American F-6 Mustang, 1945
- Boeing KC-97 Stratofreighter, 1953–1960

== Awards and campaigns ==
Award streamer	Award	Dates	Notes
	Air Force Outstanding Unit Award	1 November 1956 – 1 February 1957	308th Air Refueling Squadron

Campaign Streamer	Campaign	Dates	Notes
	American Theater without inscription	15 June 1942 – 1 May 1944	318th Bombardment Squadron

== See also ==
- List of United States Air Force air refueling squadrons
- B-17 Flying Fortress units of the United States Army Air Forces
