= 40th Air Refueling Squadron =

Former US Air Force unit

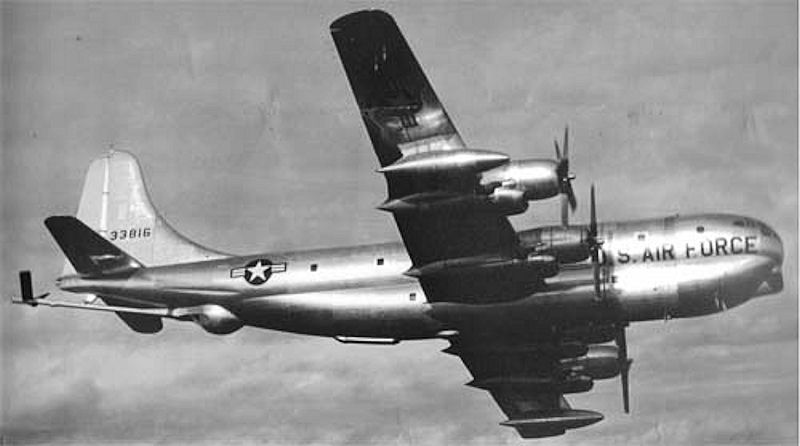
- KC-97 Stratofreighter as flown by the squadron (Note: Aircraft was the last C-97 built, originally as Boeing KC-97G-29-BO Stratofreighter, serial 53-3816, upgraded to KC-97G-145-BO. This Aircraft was retired to Military Aircraft Storage and Disposition Center on 17 December 1965. It was converted to KC-97L configuration and returned to service in the Arizona Air National Guard on 26 March 1970. It was later on the Mexican civil registry as XA-PII operated by Aero Pacifico under contract for Grupo Bimbo. It was later purchased by the Berlin Airlift Historical Foundation to provide spares for its display KC-97 and scrapped. Baugher, Joe (2 April 2023). "1953 USAF Serial Numbers". Joe Baugher.)
- Active: 1942–1944; 1952–1963
- Country: United States
- Branch: United States Air Force
- Role: Aerial refueling

Insignia
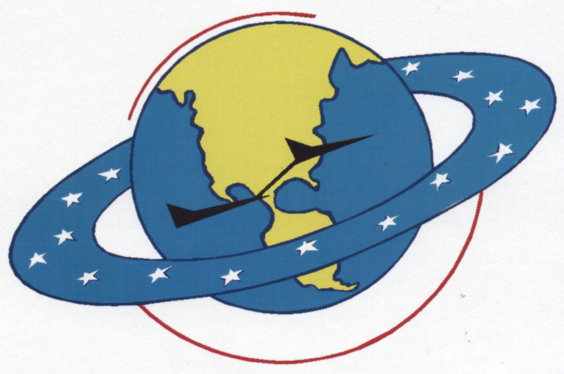
- 40th Air Refueling Squadron emblem

The 40th Air Refueling Squadron is an inactive United States Air Force unit. It was last assigned to the 310th Strategic Aerospace Wing at Schilling Air Force Base, Kansas, where it was inactivated on 15 March 1963. The squadron's first predecessor is the 540th Bombardment Squadron, which served as a heavy bomber training unit during World War II until inactivating in a 1944 reorganization of Army Air Forces training units. The 40th Squadron was activated at Schilling in 1952 and performed worldwide refueling missions until inactivated.

== History ==
=== World War II bomber training ===
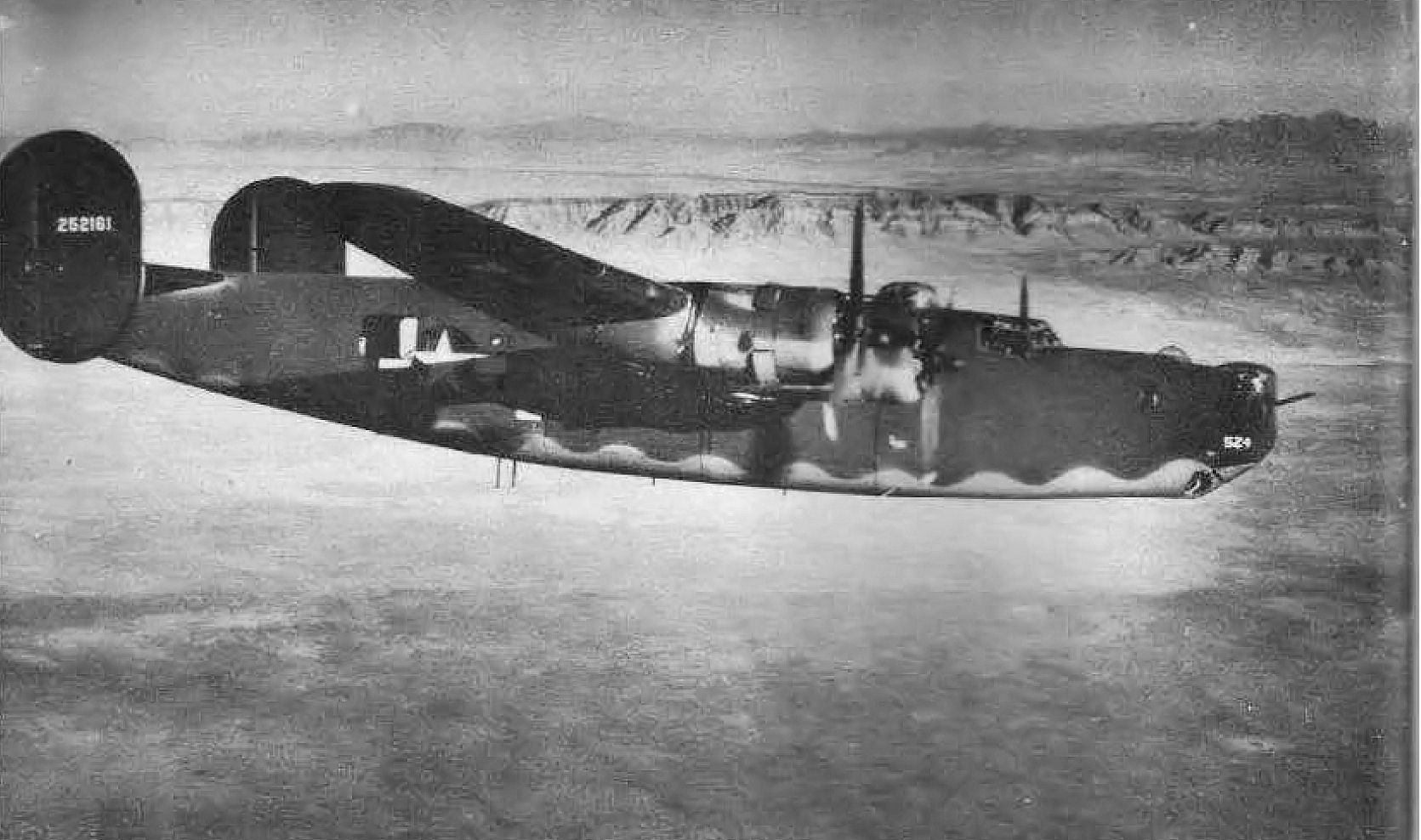
B-24 Liberator of a training unit in the southwest

The first predecessor of the squadron was the 540th Bombardment Squadron, which was activated at Salt Lake City Army Air Base, Utah as one of the four original squadrons of the 383d Bombardment Group. Its cadre moved to Rapid City Army Air Base a little over a week later, where it began to equip as a Boeing B-17 Flying Fortress Operational Training Unit (OTU) the following year. OTUs were oversized parent units that provided cadres to "satellite groups"

In October 1943, the squadron moved to Peterson Field, Colorado, where it flew Consolidated B-24 Liberator and changed its mission to become a Replacement Training Unit (RTU). Like OTUs, RTUs were oversized units, but their mission was to train individual aircrews. However, the AAF was finding that standard military units like the 540th, which were based on relatively inflexible tables of organization were not well adapted to the training mission. Accordingly, it adopted a more functional system in which each base was organized into a separate numbered unit, which was manned and equipped for the specific training mission. As a result, the 383d Group, its elements and supporting units were inactivated or disbanded and replaced by the 214th AAF Base Unit (Combat Crew Training School, Heavy), which was simultaneously organized at Peterson.

=== Air refueling operations ===
The squadron's second predecessor was activated in July 1952 at Smoky Hill Air Force Base and assigned to the 40th Bombardment Wing. The squadron remained a paper unit and did not become operational until 8 September 1952. Because its parent wing remained unmanned, the squadron was attached to the 310th Bombardment Wing until 30 April 1953.

SAC had begun to include refueling in its war plans, and the squadron made frequent deployments with its KC-97s to forward locations, placing it ahead of the faster Boeing B-47 Stratojets it would refuel, and on their programmed route, as part of Operation Reflex. Reflex placed Boeing B-47 Stratojets and KC-97s at bases closer to the Soviet Union for 90-day periods, although individuals rotated back to home bases during unit Reflex deployments During Operation Reflex deployments with the wing, the squadron's aircraft also served as transports, carrying extra air crew, support personnel, and spare parts. The percentage of Strategic Air Command (SAC) planes on alert gradually grew over the next three years to reach its goal of 1/3 of SAC's force on alert by 1960.

In 1960, the 40th Wing moved to Forbes Air Force Base, Kansas. The squadron remained behind and was reassigned to the 310th Bombardment Wing. During the Cuban Missile Crisis, on 24 October SAC went to DEFCON 2, placing all its aircraft on alert. On 29 October, additional KC-97s were dispersed to forward locations to provide refueling for B-47s on increased alert status. Dispersed B-47s and supporting tankers were recalled to their home bases on 24 November and on 27 November, SAC returned to normal alert posture. The squadron became nonoperational on 1 January 1963 and was inactivated in March 1963 as part of the phaseout of the KC-97 from SAC.

=== Consolidation ===
On 19 September 1985, the 40th Air Refueling Squadron was consolidated with the 540th Bombardment Squadron, but the consolidated unit has not been active.

== Lineage ==
540th Bombardment Squadron

- Constituted as the 540th Bombardment Squadron (Heavy) on 28 October 1942

Activated on 3 November 1942
Inactivated on 1 April 1944
Consolidated with the 40th Air Refueling Squadron as the 40th Air Refueling Squadron on 19 September 1985

40th Air Refueling Squadron

- Constituted as the 40th Air Refueling Squadron, Medium on 18 June 1952

Activated on 8 July 1952
Discontinued on 15 March 1963
Consolidated with the 540th Bombardment Squadron on 19 September 1985

=== Assignments ===
- 383d Bombardment Group, 3 November 1942 – 1 April 1944
- 40th Bombardment Wing, 8 July 1952 (attached to 310th Bombardment Wing, 8 September 1952 – 30 April 1953, detached 1–10 March 1954, 4 May–27 June 1954, 25 June–5 September 1956, c. 1 July–c. 1 October 1957, c. 1 October 1958 – 10 January 1959)
- 310th Bombardment Wing (later 310th Strategic Aerospace Wing), 1 June 1960 – 15 March 1963

=== Stations ===
- Salt Lake City Army Air Base, Utah, 3 November 1942
- Rapid City Army Air Base, South Dakota, 12 November 1942
- Ainsworth Army Air Field, Nebraska, 13 December 1942
- Rapid City Army Air Base, South Dakota, 26 April 1943
- Geiger Field, Washington, 20 June 1943
- Peterson Field, Colorado, c. 26 October 1943 – 1 April 1944
- Smoky Hill Air Force Base (later Schilling Air Force Base), Kansas, 8 July 1952 – 15 March 1963

=== Aircraft ===
- Boeing B-17 Flying Fortress, 1943
- Consolidated B-24 Liberator, 1943–1944
- Boeing KC-97 Stratofreighter, 1953–1964

=== Campaigns ===
Campaign Streamer	Campaign	Dates	Notes
	American Theater without inscription	3 November 1942 – 1 April 1944	540th Bombardment Squadron

== See also ==
- List of United States Air Force air refueling squadrons
- B-24 Liberator units of the United States Army Air Forces
- B-17 Flying Fortress units of the United States Army Air Forces
