= 88th Bombardment Group =

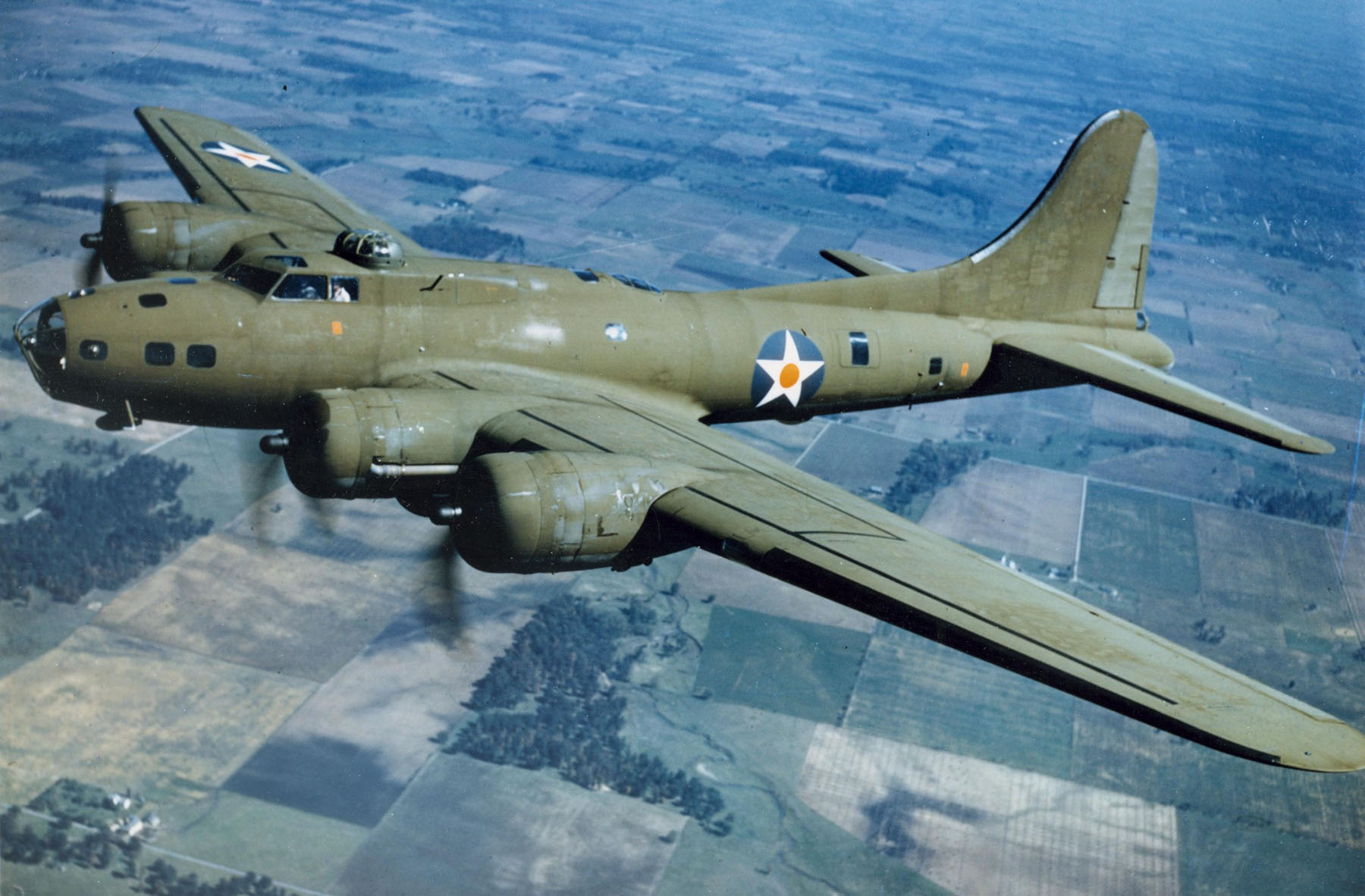
- B-17 Flying Fortress flown by the group
- Active: 1942–1944
- Country: United States
- Branch: United States Air Force
- Role: heavy bomber training
- Motto: Power to Shatter

Insignia
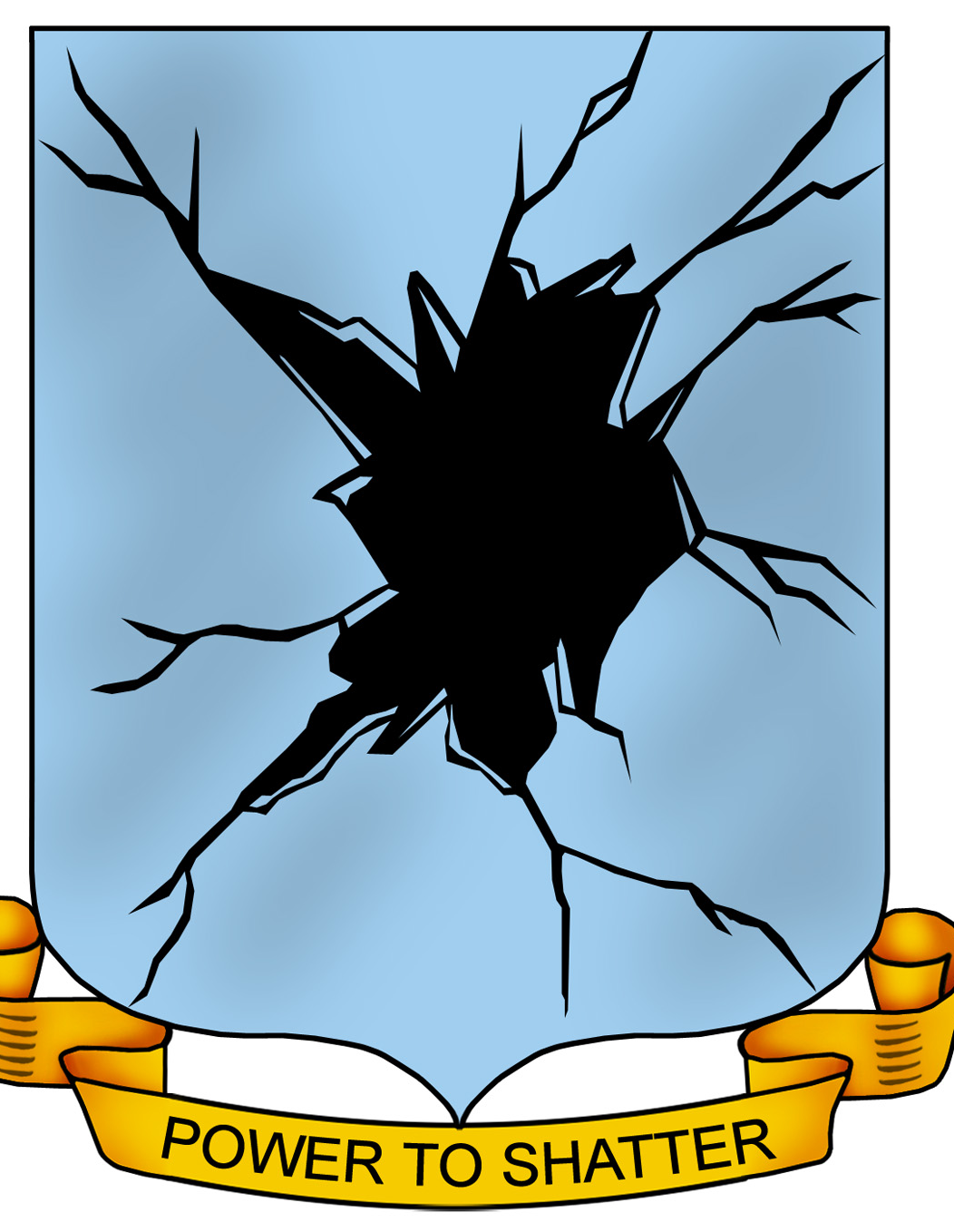
- 88th Bombardment Group emblem (Note: Approved 7 January 1943.)

The 88th Bombardment Group is an inactive United States Air Force unit. During World War II, the group served as a training unit for Boeing B-17 Flying Fortress units and aircrews. It was inactivated in May 1944, when the Army Air Forces reorganized its training units, replacing units like the 88th that were organized under rigid tables of organization.

== History ==
The 88th Bombardment Group was activated in July 1942 at Salt Lake City Army Air Base, Utah. However, it existed only on paper until September 1942, when it was organized at Geiger Field, Washington, with the 316th, 317th, 318th and 399th Bombardment Squadrons as its operational components. (Note: The squadron was constituted as the 9th Reconnaissance Squadron, but was redesignated before being activated. Maurer, Combat Squadrons, pp.489-490.)

The group soon moved to Walla Walla Army Air Base, Washington, where it equipped with Boeing B-17 Flying Fortresses and initially acted as an Operational Training Unit (OTU). The OTU program involved the use of an oversized parent unit to provide cadres to "satellite groups" However, within a month of organization it became a Replacement Training Unit. RTUs were also oversized units, but had a mission to train individual pilots or aircrews. In late 1943, Second Air Force, which had been conducting nearly all of the Army Air Force (AAF)'s heavy bomber training, began to concentrate on Boeing B-29 Superfortress training. The group moved to Avon Park Army Air Field, Florida in November, becoming part of Third Air Force.

However, the AAF was finding that standard military units like the 88th Group, whose equipment and manning were based on relatively inflexible tables of organization were not well adapted to the training mission. Accordingly, it adopted a more functional system in which each base was organized into a separate numbered unit. As a result, the group and supporting units at Avon Park were inactivated on 1 May 1944, and replaced by the 325th AAF Base Unit (Replacement Training, Bombardment, Heavy).

== Lineage ==
- Constituted as the 88th Bombardment Group (Heavy) on 28 January 1942

Activated on 15 July 1942
Inactivated on 1 May 1944

=== Assignments ===
- II Bomber Command, 15 July 1942 (attached to 17th Bombardment Wing (later 17th Bombardment Training Wing, 17th Bombardment Operational Training Wing) after c. 1 November 1942)
- Second Air Force, 6 October 1943 (attached to 17th Bombardment Operational Training Wing)
- III Bomber Command, c. 9 November 1943 – 1 May 1944

=== Components ===
- 316th Bombardment Squadron: 15 July 1942 – 1 May 1944
- 317th Bombardment Squadron: 15 July 1942 – 1 May 1944
- 318th Bombardment Squadron: 15 July 1942 – 1 May 1944
- 399th Bombardment Squadron: 15 July 1942 – 1 May 1944

=== Stations ===
- Salt Lake City Army Air Base, Utah, 15 July 1942
- Geiger Field, Washington, 1 September 1942
- Walla Walla Army Air Base, Washington, 21 September 1942
- Rapid City Army Air Base, South Dakota, c. 28 October 1942
- Walla Walla Army Air Base, Washington, c. 28 November 1942
- Avon Park Army Air Field, Florida, c. 9 November 1943 – 1 May 1944

=== Aircraft ===
- Boeing B-17 Flying Fortress, 1942-1944

=== Campaigns ===
Campaign Streamer	Campaign	Dates	Notes
	American Theater without inscription	15 July 1942 – 1 May 1944	
