= SARPA =

Colombian airline

IATA	ICAO	Call sign
-	-	SARPA
- Founded: June 1980
- AOC #: UAEAC-CDO-051; UAEAC-CDO-056
- Hubs: Bogotá; Medellín-JMC (commercial); Medellín-Olaya Herrera
- Fleet size: 8
- Destinations: 8 (scheduled)
- Headquarters: Medellín, Colombia
- Employees: 150
- Website: www.sarpa.com.co

SARPA S.A.S. (Spanish: Servicios Aéreos Panamericanos S.A.S.) is an air charter and air ambulance operator, with its main base at El Dorado International Airport in Bogotá, and an auxiliary base in Medellín.

== History ==
The airline was founded in June 1980 in Puerto Asís, Putumayo Department. It started providing support to small cities and towns, grew to become a rotorcraft operator providing support to drilling companies in the Colombian eastern plains, started fixed wing operations in 2004, and since evolved to become one of the major on demand operators in Colombia.

In October 2021, SARPA received its certification to operate commercial routes from its base José María Córdova International Airport with Embraer ERJ 145 and began flights on December 15, 2021.

== Scheduled destinations ==
SARPA operates commercial flights to the following airports:

Country	City	Airport	Notes	Refs
Aruba	Oranjestad	Queen Beatrix International Airport		
Colombia	Barranquilla	Ernesto Cortissoz International Airport	Terminated	
Colombia	Cali	Alfonso Bonilla Aragón International Airport	Terminated	
Colombia	Medellín	José María Córdova International Airport	Hub	
Colombia	Montería	Los Garzones Airport		
Colombia	Pasto	Antonio Nariño Airport	Terminated	
Colombia	Riohacha	Almirante Padilla Airport		
Colombia	Valledupar	Alfonso López Pumarejo Airport		
Colombia	Villavicencio	La Vanguardia Airport		
Curaçao	Willemstad	Curaçao International Airport	Terminated	
Ecuador	Quito	Mariscal Sucre International Airport	Seasonal charter	
Panama	Panama City	Albrook "Marcos A. Gelabert" International Airport	Seasonal charter	

== Fleet ==
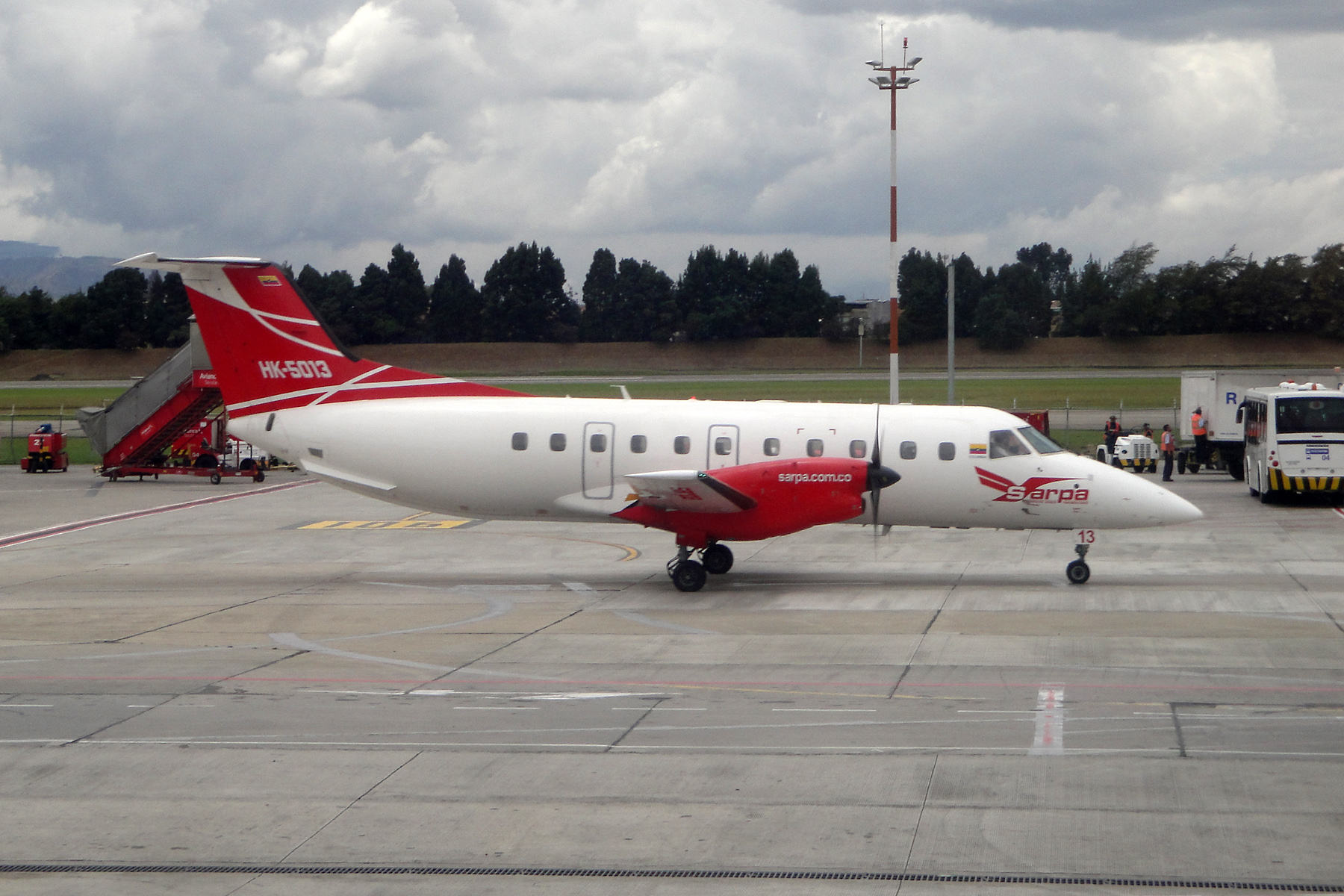
A SARPA Embraer EMB 120ER Brasilia taxiing at El Dorado International Airport in 2014

SARPA operates the following aircraft as of March 2023:

SARPA fleet
Aircraft	In service	Orders	Passengers	Notes
BAe Jetstream 32	3 (as of July 2026)	—	19	
Embraer EMB 120ER Brasilia	1	—	30	
Embraer ERJ145LR	3 (as of July 2026)	—	50	One leased to SATENA
Learjet 45XR	1	—	5	Air Ambulance Configuration with two stretchers
Total	8	—		

The airline operates all around Colombia and internationally. Pioneer of Air Ambulance operation in Colombia, first operator to obtain an Operating Certificate for air ambulance operations in the country.

== See also ==
- List of airlines of Colombia
