= Eugene P. Moran =

American B-17 tail gunner and World War II prisoner of war

Eugene Paul Moran
- Born: July 17, 1924; Scott Township, Crawford County, Wisconsin, U.S.
- Died: March 23, 2014 (aged 89); Soldiers Grove, Wisconsin, U.S.
- Military career
- Allegiance: United States
- Branch: United States Army Air Forces
- Service years: 1942–1945
- Rank: Staff Sergeant
- Units: 339th Bombardment Squadron, 96th Bomb Group, 8th Air Force
- Conflicts: World War II
- Awards: Air Medal with Oak Leaf Cluster; Two Purple Hearts; European–African–Middle Eastern Campaign Medal; Good Conduct Medal

Eugene Paul Moran (July 17, 1924 – March 23, 2014) was a United States Army Air Forces tail gunner during World War II who survived an aircrew incident in the European air war—falling several miles to earth when the tail of his Boeing B-17 Flying Fortress bomber was shot off over Germany.

== Early life ==
Moran was born on July 17, 1924, in Scott Township near Soldiers Grove, Wisconsin. He grew up on a dairy farm a few miles south of Soldiers Grove.

== Military service ==
In October 1942, at age 18, Moran enlisted in the United States Army Air Corps. He was trained as an aerial gunner and assigned to the 339th Bombardment Squadron, 96th Bomb Group, Eighth Air Force, based in England. Moran flew missions aboard a B-17 nicknamed Rikki Tikki Tavi.

== Incident over Germany ==
On November 29, 1943, during a mission to Bremen, Germany, Moran’s aircraft was attacked by fighters and anti-aircraft fire. The tail section was sheared away from the fuselage, leaving Moran trapped in the tail at an altitude of about 28,000 feet (8,500 m). Though badly wounded and unable to use his parachute, Moran remained within the disintegrating tail as it descended. The section struck a tree and the ground, but Moran survived with severe injuries, including broken ribs, shattered forearms, and a fractured skull.

He was captured by German troops and spent approximately 17 months as a prisoner of war in Germany and occupied Poland. Moran endured forced marches and imprisonment in several camps before being liberated by Allied forces in 1945. He was discharged on December 1, 1945, with the rank of Staff Sergeant, having earned two Purple Hearts, the Air Medal with Oak Leaf Cluster, the European–African–Middle Eastern Campaign Medal, and the Good Conduct Medal.

== Post-war life ==
After returning home, Moran married Margaret “Peg” Finley; the couple raised nine children. He worked as a rural mail carrier for more than thirty years, served as a volunteer firefighter and fire chief, helped found the local rescue squad, and was a member of the Crawford County Board of Supervisors for two decades. In 2007, Moran received the Wisconsin Veterans Lifetime Achievement Award. A year later, a street in Soldiers Grove was named Eugene P. Moran Park Drive in his honor.

== Death and legacy ==
Moran died on March 23, 2014, in Soldiers Grove, Wisconsin, at the age of 89. His story has been featured in newspapers, radio programs, and the book Tailspin: The Strange Case of Eugene Moran by John Armbruster. It is often cited as one of the most remarkable survival episodes involving aircrew during World War II.
