= Aero Pacífico =

Mexican regional airline

Aeropacífico S.A. de C.V. is a Mexican regional airline founded in 2000, which offers scheduled and charter flights in the Mexican Northern Pacific region.

== Destinations ==
=== Baja California Sur ===
- SJD Los Cabos

=== Chihuahua ===
- CUU Chihuahua

=== Sinaloa ===
- CUL Culiacán
- LMM Los Mochis

=== Sonora ===
- HMO Hermosillo

== Fleet ==
The Aeropacífico Fleet comprises 2 twin-engine turboprop aircraft with capacity for 19 passengers and 2 crews:

- 1 Let L-410
- 1 BAe Jetstream
