= Nordenskiöld =

Nordenskiöld or Nordenskjöld or Nordenskjold or Nordenskiold may refer to:

- Nordenskiöld (surname), people with the surname Nordenskiöld

== Places ==
Antarctica

- Nordenskjold Coast, a section of the coast of the east side of the Antarctic Peninsula
- Nordenskjold Basin, an undersea basin in the Antarctic
- Nordenskjold Ice Tongue in the Antarctic
- Nordenskjold Glacier in the Antarctic
- Nordenskjold Outcrops in the Antarctic
- Nordenskjold Peak, a mountain in the Antarctic
- Nordenskiöld Base

Greenland

- Nordenskiold Fjord in Greenland
- Nordenskiold Glacier, East Greenland
- Nordenskiold Glacier, Northwest Greenland
- Nordenskiold Glacier, West Greenland

Russia

- Nordenskjold Archipelago, an island group in the Kara Sea.
- Nordenskiöld Bay, Novaya Zemlya
- Nordenskiöld Glacier (Novaya Zemlya)

Elsewhere

- Nordenskiöld Lake, an alpine lake in Chile's Torres del Paine national park
- Nordenskiold Bay in Svalbard
- Nordenskiöld Land, in Svalbard

== See also ==
- List of craters on Mars: H–N
- Laptev Sea
