= Nordenskiöld (surname) =

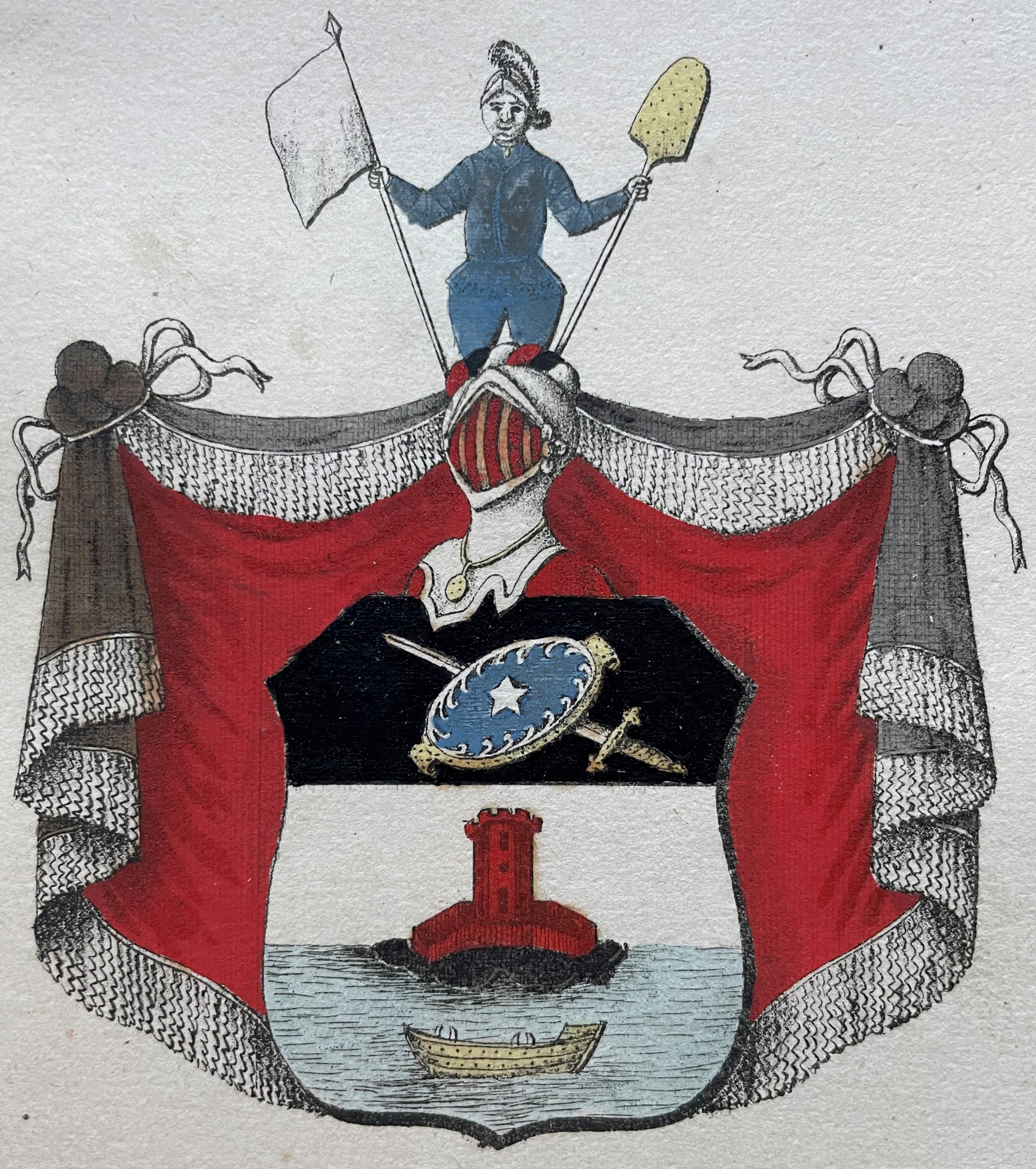
Coat of arms of the Nordenskiöld family

The Nordenskiöld family or Nordenskjöld (Swedish pronunciation: [ˈnǔːɖɛnɧœld], Finland Swedish: [ˈnuːrdenʃøld]) is a Finnish and Swedish noble family, which in 1894 also became part of the Prussian nobility.

== Notable members ==
Nordenskiöld branch:

- Otto Henrik Nordenskiöld (1747–1832), Swedish Admiral
- August Nordenskiöld (1754–1792), alchemist, brother of Otto Henrik
- Adolf Erik Nordenskiöld (1832–1901), scientist and explorer, son of Nils Gustaf
- Bengt Nordenskiöld (1891–1983), Swedish Air Force general
- Claës-Henrik Nordenskiöld (1917–2003), Swedish Air Force major general, son of Bengt
- Erik Nordenskiöld (1872–1933), zoologist and science historian
- Erland Nordenskiöld (1877–1932), archeologist and anthropologist, younger son of Adolf Erik
- Günter von Nordenskjöld (1910–1997), German politician (CDU)
- Gustaf Nordenskiöld (1868–1895), scholar, elder son of Adolf Erik
- Nils Gustaf Nordenskiöld (1792–1866), mineralogist and traveller

Nordenskjöld branch:

- Nils Otto Gustaf Nordenskjöld (1869–1928), explorer and geographer, nephew of Adolf Nordenskiöld

== See also ==
- The National Biography of Finland
- Swedish-speaking Finns
