= Adolf Erik Nordenskiöld =

Finland-Swedish baron, geologist and explorer (1832–1901)

Friherre Adolf Erik Nordenskiöld
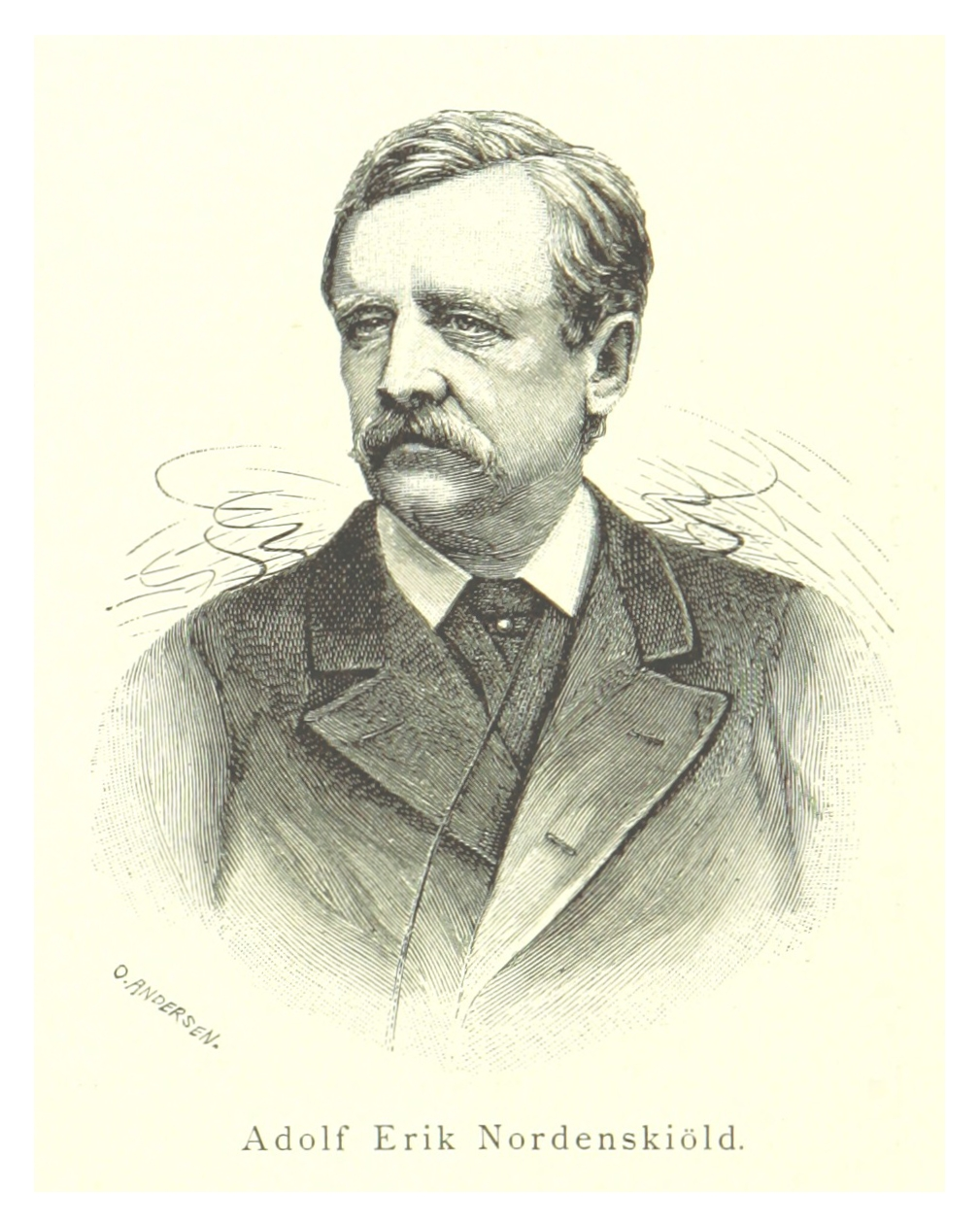
- Adolf Erik Nordenskiöld
- Born: 18 November 1832; Helsingfors, Grand Duchy of Finland, Russian Empire
- Died: 12 August 1901 (aged 68); Dalbyö, Sweden
- Education: Imperial Alexander University of Finland
- Known for: Vega Expedition through the Northeast Passage
- Awards: Founder's Medal (1869); Constantine Medal (1878); Vega Medal (1881); Murchison Medal (1900)
- Scientific career
- Fields: Geology; mineralogy; cartography
- Workplaces: Naturhistoriska Riksmuseet

Nils Adolf Erik Nordenskiöld (18 November 1832 – 12 August 1901) was a Finland-Swedish aristocrat, geologist, mineralogist and Arctic explorer. He was a member of the noble Nordenskiöld family of scientists and held the title of friherre (baron).

Born in the Grand Duchy of Finland in the Russian Empire, he was forced to move to Sweden in 1857 due to his political activity, where he became a member of the Parliament of Sweden and of the Swedish Academy. He led the Vega Expedition along the northern coast of Eurasia in 1878–1879. This was the first complete crossing of the Northeast Passage. Initially a troubled enterprise, the successful expedition is considered to be among the highest achievements in the history of Swedish science.

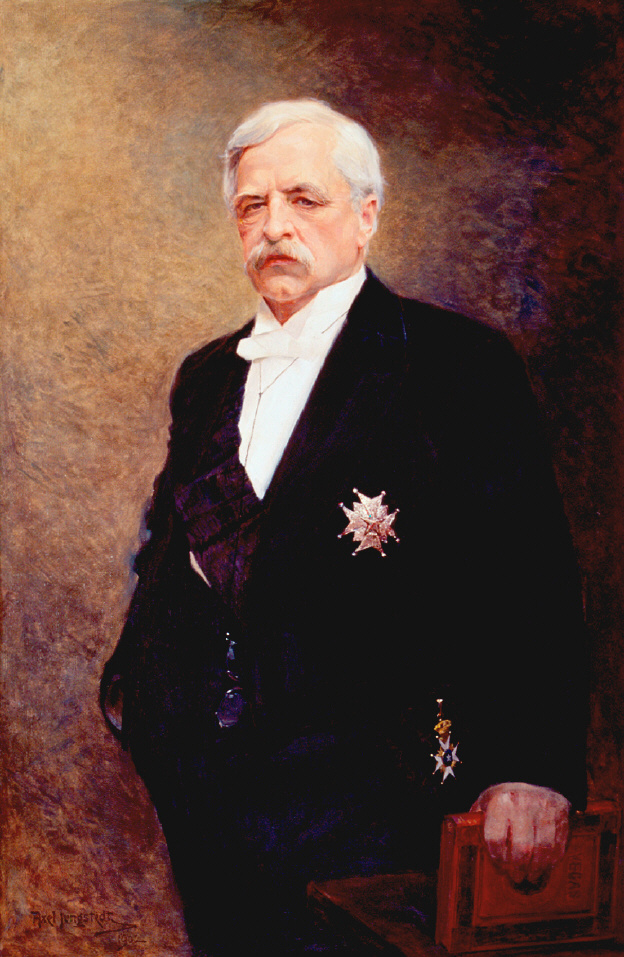
Nils Adolf Erik Nordenskiöld by Axel Jungstedt 1902

== Nordenskiöld family ==
The Nordenskiölds were an old Fenno-Swedish family, and members of the nobility. Nordenskiöld's father, Nils Gustaf Nordenskiöld, was a Finnish mineralogist, civil servant and traveller. He was also a member of the Russian Academy of Sciences.

Adolf Erik was the father of Gustaf Nordenskiöld (explorer of Mesa Verde) and Erland Nordenskiöld (ethnographer of South America) and maternal uncle of Nils Otto Gustaf Nordenskjöld (another polar explorer). Nils Otto Gustaf Nordenskjöld's parents were cousins — Otto Gustaf Nordenskjöld (born in 1831 in Hässleby, Sweden) and Anna Elisabet Sofia Nordenskiöld (born in 1841 in Finland), who was the sister of Adolf Erik Nordenskiöld. The Swedish side of the family used the spelling "Nordenskjöld", whereas the Finnish side of the family used the "Nordenskiöld" spelling. His nephew Erik Nordenskiöld became a zoologist and historian of biology.

== Biography ==
=== Early life and education ===
Nordenskiöld was born in 1832 in Helsinki, the capital of Finland, but he spent his early youth on the family estate, the Frugård Manor, located in the Numminen village in Mäntsälä. He went to school in Porvoo, a small town on the south coast of Finland. He then entered the Imperial Alexander University in Helsinki in 1849 where he studied mathematics, geology, and applied himself especially to chemistry and mineralogy. He received his master's degree in 1853. Two years later he published his doctoral dissertation, entitled "Om grafitens och chondroditens kristallformer" ("On the crystal forms of graphite and chondrodite").

Upon his graduation, in 1853, Nordenskiöld accompanied his father to the Ural Mountains and studied the iron and copper mines at Tagilsk; on his return he received minor appointments both at the university and the mining office.

=== Political activity and exile ===
Having studied under Johan Ludvig Runeberg, Nordenskiöld belonged to Liberal, anti-tsarist circles that agitated for Finland's liberation from Russia by the Swedes during the Crimean War. An unguarded speech at a convivial entertainment in 1855 drew the attention of the Imperial Russian authorities to his political views, and led to a dismissal from the university.

He then visited Berlin, continuing his mineralogical studies, and in 1856 obtained a travelling stipend from the university in Helsinki and planned to expend it in geological research in Siberia and Kamchatka. In 1856, Nordenskiöld was also appointed Docent in Mineralogy at the university. In 1857 he aroused the suspicion of the authorities again, so that he was forced to leave Finland, practically as a political refugee, and was deprived of the right of ever holding office in the university of Finland. He fled to Sweden.

In 1862, he was one of the founding members of Sällskapet Idun, a men's association founded in Stockholm.

In 1863 he married Anna Maria Mannerheim, the aunt of Marshal C. G. E. Mannerheim.

=== Settling in Stockholm, and Arctic exploration ===
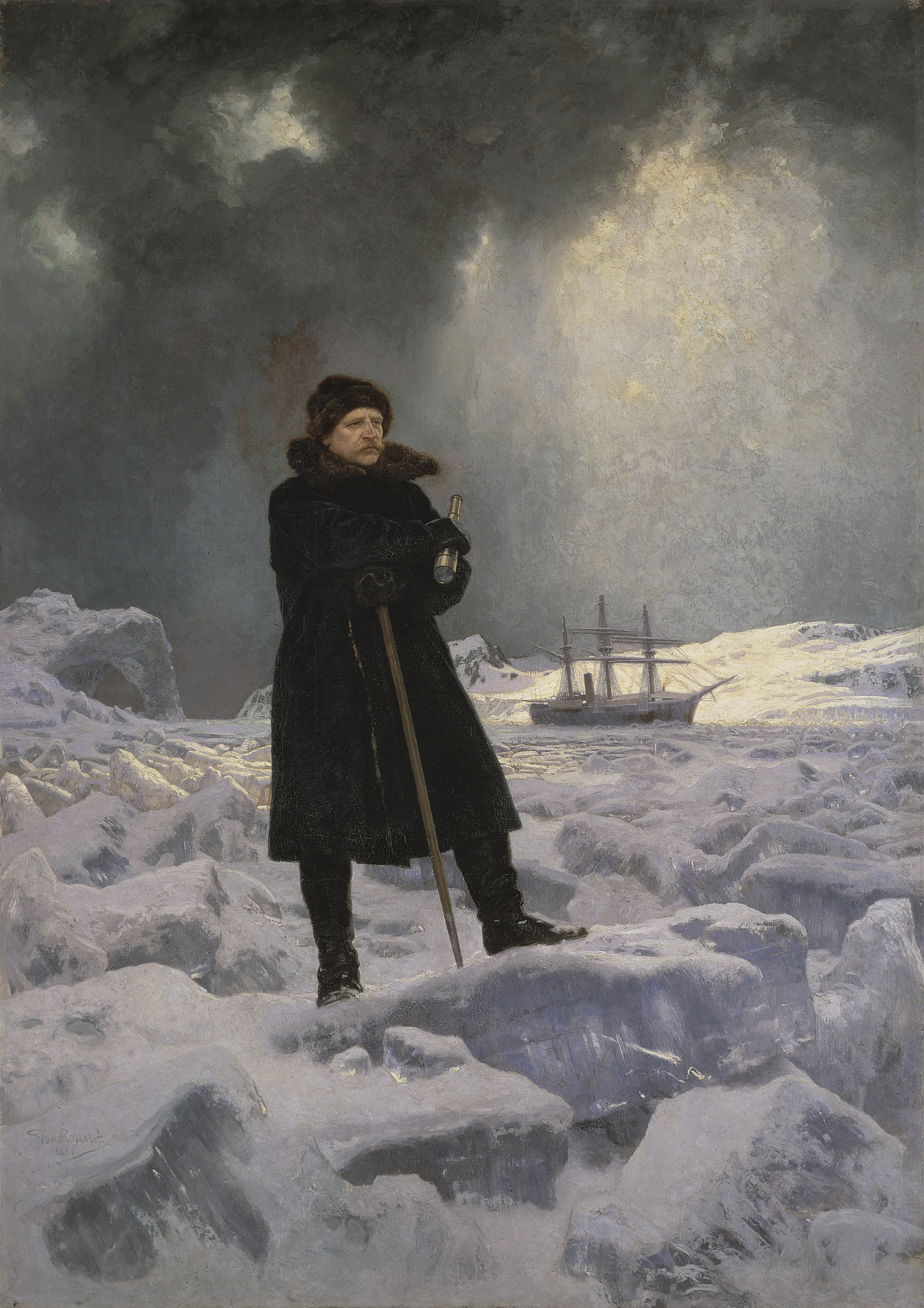
Nils Adolf Erik Nordenskiöld with the Vega Georg von Rosen (1886)

Nordenskiöld settled in Stockholm, and soon he received an offer from Otto Torell, a geologist, to accompany him on an expedition to Spitsbergen. To the observations of Torell on glacial phenomena Nordenskiöld added the discovery at Bell Sound of remains of Tertiary plants, and on the return of the expedition he received the appointment of a curator and Director of the Mineralogical Department of the Swedish Museum of Natural History (Naturhistoriska Riksmuseet) and a professorship in Mineralogy at the Swedish Academy of Sciences. He was also awarded the 1869 Royal Geographical Society's Founder's Medal.

Nordenskiöld's participation in three geological expeditions to Spitsbergen, followed by longer Arctic explorations in 1867, 1870, 1872 and 1875, led him to attempt the discovery of the long-sought Northeast Passage. This he accomplished in the voyage of the SS Vega, navigating for the first time the northern coasts of Europe and Asia. Starting from Karlskrona on 22 June 1878, the Vega doubled Cape Chelyuskin in the following August, and after being frozen in at the end of September near the Bering Strait, completed the voyage successfully in the following summer. He edited a monumental record of the expedition in five volumes, and himself wrote a more popular summary in two volumes. On his return to Sweden he received an enthusiastic welcome, and in April 1880 was made a baron and a commander of the Order of the North Star.

In 1883, he visited the east coast of Greenland for the second time, and succeeded in taking his ship through the great ice barrier, a feat attempted in vain during more than three centuries. The captain on the Vega expedition, Louis Palander, was made a nobleman at the same time, and took the name Palander af Vega.

=== Later life and death ===
In 1893, Nordenskiöld was elected to the 12th chair of the Swedish Academy. In 1900 he received the Murchison Medal from the Geological Society of London. He was nominated for the first Nobel Prize in Physics but died before the prizes were awarded.

Nordenskiöld died on 12 August 1901, in Dalbyö, Södermanland, Sweden, at the age of 68.

== Historian of early cartography ==
As an explorer, Nordenskiöld was interested in the history of Arctic exploration, especially as evidenced in old maps. This interest in turn led him to collect and systematically study early maps. He wrote two substantial monographs, which both included many facsimiles, on early printed atlases and geographical mapping and medieval marine charts, respectively the Facsimile-Atlas to the Early History of Cartography (1889) and Periplus: An essay on the early history of charts and sailing directions (1897).

He left his huge personal collection of early maps to the University of Helsinki, and it was inscribed on UNESCO's Memory of the World International Register in 1997.

== Expeditions ==
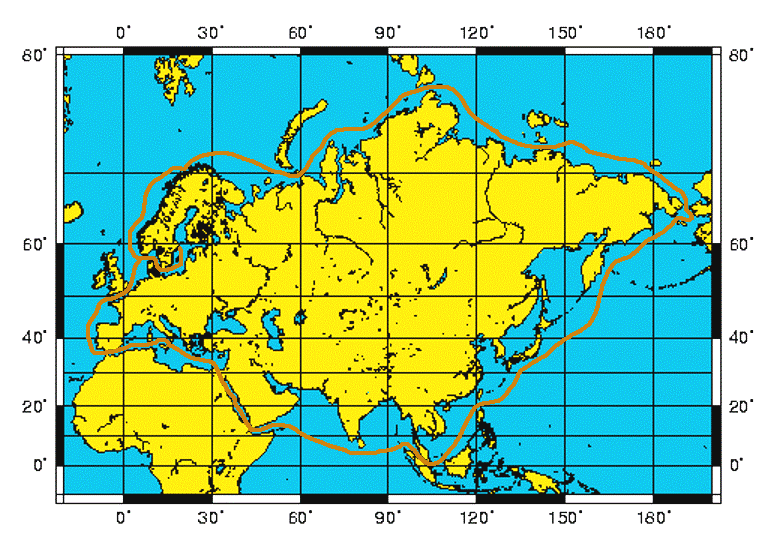
Journey of 1878–1879 around Eurasia

- In 1858, Nordenskiöld took part in Torell's first expedition to Svalbard in the sloop Frithiof. The expedition made biological and geological observations along the coast of Spitsbergen.
- In 1861, he took part in Torell's second Svalbard expedition on board the Æolus. This included a boat journey along the scarcely explored northern coast of Nordaustlandet as far as Prins Oscars Land. They also began to measure a meridian arc, but did not complete the work.
- In 1864, the Royal Swedish Academy of Sciences placed Nordenskiöld in command of the schooner Axel Thordsen to complete the meridian arc survey. After conducting the necessary measurements in the south of Svalbard, they rescued 27 men who had to abandon their ice-locked ships.
- In 1868 on the schooner-rigged iron steamer Sofia, he went farther north than any vessel had ever been in the Eastern Hemisphere. He reached 82° 42' N, surpassing William Scoresby's previous record by 12'.
- In 1870, he visited Greenland to find out whether using sledge dogs was advisable for a polar expedition. He came to the conclusion that it would be impractical to procure and rely on a large number of dogs from Greenland in view of recent outbreaks of a contagious dog sickness. He made a journey ca. 48 km (30 mi) onto the inland ice. At Uivfaq on Disko Island, several large blocks of native iron were found that Nordenskiöld assumed to be meteorites. Nowadays it is thought that the iron accumulated in basalt formations through volcanic eruptions.
- In 1872, Nordenskiöld embarked on an expedition to reach the North Pole using reindeer. To this end, the steamer Polhem, the steamer Onkel Adam, and the brig Gladan met by Spitsbergen. At Mosselbukta, the three ships were unexpectedly frozen in. Nordenskiöld was faced with feeding the 67 men throughout the winter, as well as helping out the crews from six Norwegian hunting vessels that had suffered the same fate. The situation was worsened when all but one of the reindeer escaped. Instead of a sledge journey to the pole, only a trip to Nordaustlandet could be undertaken during which one expedition member disappeared while searching for driftwood. The supplies ran dangerously low and scurvy was rampant. Only one sailor succumbed to it however, because Benjamin Leigh Smith on the steamer Diana found the beset ships and donated his provisions. Two weeks later, the ice opened up and the ships could return to Sweden.
- In 1875, he went to the Yenisei River in Siberia, on board the sloop Pröven, which he sent back while he went up the river in a boat and returned home by land.
- In 1876, Nordenskiöld repeated the journey to the mouth of the Yenisei with the steamer Ymer to prove that this route was not dependent on unusually favourable ice conditions.
- In 1878–1879 he was the first to complete the entire Northeast passage along the northern coast of Eurasia. This he accomplished in the voyage of the Vega. Starting from Karlskrona on 22 June 1878, the Vega doubled Cape Chelyuskin in August. Vega was initially accompanied by the ships Lena, Fraser, and Express. The latter two parted way at the mouth of the Yenisei and traveled upstream. Lena navigated up the River Lena to Yakutsk. At the end of September, Vega was frozen in near the Bering Strait and passed the winter among the coastal Chukchi. By sailing through Bering Strait in July 1879, Vega completed the Northeast Passage.
- In 1882–1883 – 2nd Dickson Expedition ("Den andra Dicksonska Expeditionen till Grönland"), he took Sofia to Disko Bay where, together with three Saami, he made an expedition to the inland ice sheet. He expected the interior of Greenland to be ice-free and perhaps covered in forests. Nordenskiöld quickly had to give up due to technical problems, but the Saami penetrated 230 kilometres eastward before returning. On the east coast of Greenland, the expedition penetrated the great ice barrier—as the first after 300 years of attempts—and landed at Ammasalik (Kung Oscars Hamn) 65° 37' N, only slightly to the north of where Wilhelm August Graah was forced to turn his Umiak expedition round in 1830.

== Honours ==
- Nordenskiöld Archipelago, an island group in the Kara Sea, off the Siberian coast
- The Laptev Sea used to be called "Nordenskiöld Sea" (Russian: мо́ре Норденшёльда), in honour of this Arctic explorer.
- Nordenskiöld Fjord in Peary Land, Greenland
- Nordenskiöld Bay, Novaya Zemlya
- Nordenskiöld Glacier, East Greenland
- Nordenskiöld Glacier, Northwest Greenland
- Nordenskiöld Glacier, West Greenland
- Nordenskiöld Glacier (Novaya Zemlya), a group of four glaciers
- Nordenskiöldbreen, a glacier in Svalbard
- Nordenskiöld Bay in Svalbard
- Nordenskiöld crater on Mars
- Nordenskiöld was the main motif for a Finnish commemorative coin of 2007, the €10 Adolf Erik Nordenskiöld and Northeast Passage commemorative coin. The issue celebrated the 175th anniversary Nordenskiöld's birth and his discovery of the Northeast Passage.
- Nordenskiöldinkatu (Nordenskiöld street), a street in Helsinki, Finland

Cultural offices
Preceded by Anders Anderson	Swedish Academy, Seat No 12; 1893–1901	Succeeded by Gustaf Retzius
