= Gustaf Nordenskiöld =

Swedish scholar (1868–1895)

Gustaf Nordenskiöld (29 June 1868 – 6 June 1895) was a Swedish scholar of Finnish-Swedish descent who was the first to scientifically study the ancient Pueblo cliff dwellings in Mesa Verde. He was a member of the Nordenskiöld family of scientists and the eldest son of polar explorer Baron Adolf Erik Nordenskiöld and his equally aristocratic wife, Anna Maria Mannerheim.

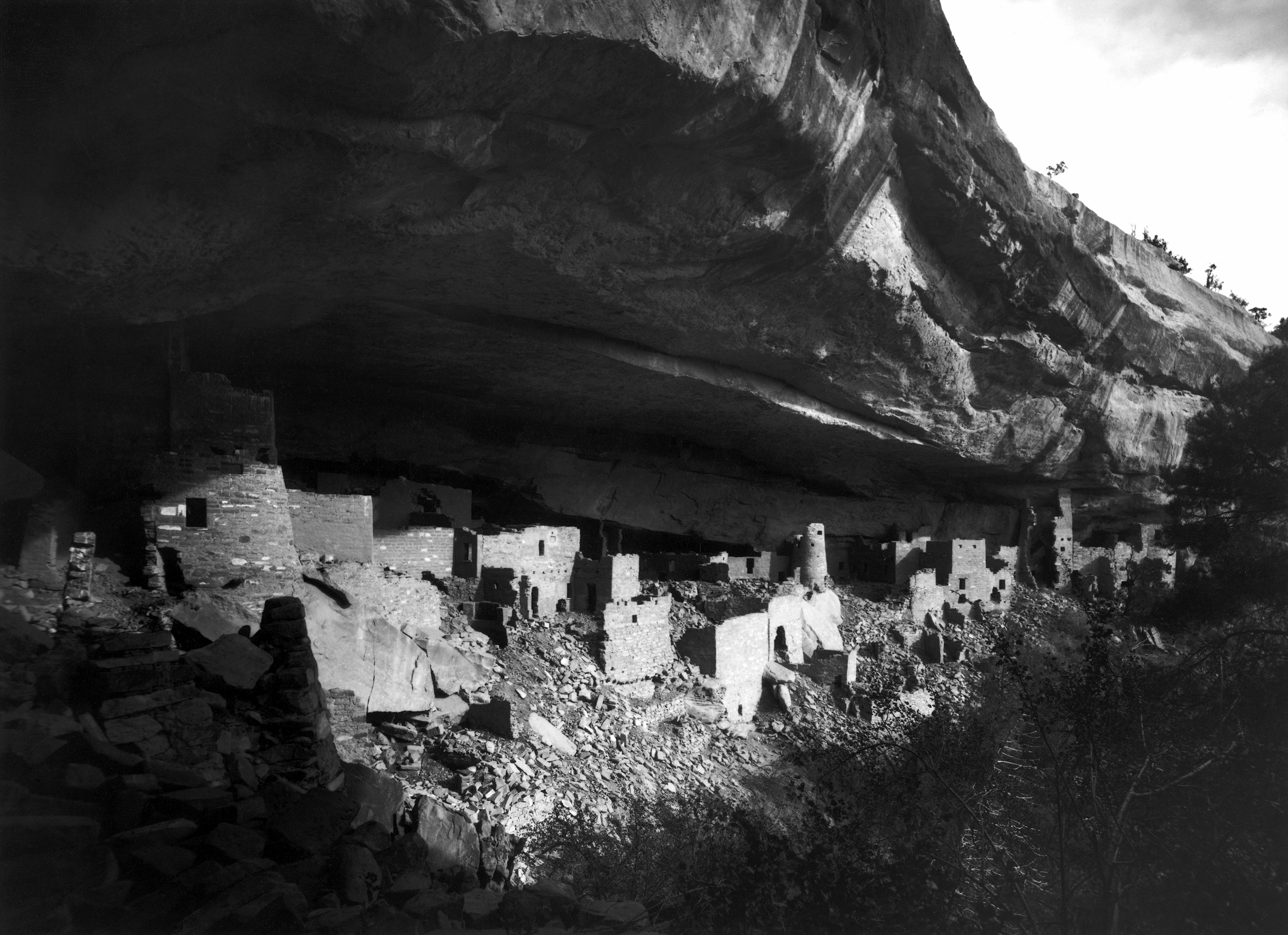
The Cliff Palace at Mesa Verde, photo by Gustaf Nordenskiöld, 1891

Nordenskiöld was featured on the Ken Burns PBS series The National Parks: America's Best Idea.

== Early life ==
Nordenskiöld completed school at Beskowska skolan in Stockholm and studied at Uppsala University and the new Stockholm University, graduating with a B.A. from Uppsala in 1889. The next year (1890) he traveled to Svalbard together with J. A. Björling and A. Klinckowström, bringing a collection of plant fossils back to the Swedish Museum of Natural History. After his return, he was diagnosed with tuberculosis and went to Berlin for treatment.

== Nordenskiöld in America ==
Nordenskiöld's North American segment of a world tour began when he landed in New York on 27 May 1891 aboard the SS Waesland of the Red Star Line. (Letter No. 2, The Letters of Gustaf Nordenskiöld Mesa Verde 1991). In Letter No. 9 from Charleston, North Carolina, he tells his father to address letters to the Swedish Consulate in San Francisco and on 27 June 1891 he wrote to his mother from Denver, Colorado, and included a request that further letters be addressed to the Swedish Consulate in Yokohama, Japan, so the world tour was still on his mind. Three days later, on 30 June 1891, also from Denver, he tells his father that tomorrow he was going to Durango, Colorado, and the "Mancos Valley" where there are a "number of cliff dwellings".

This break in the itinerary of his world tour was permanent.

When Nordenskiöld arrived in Durango he made arrangements to stay with cattle rancher Richard Wetherill at the Alamo Ranch in Mancos, Colorado. This is confirmed in a 2 July 1893 letter to his father in which he requests his photographic equipment, consisting of a camera, tripod, lens, cassette for photographic plates, shutter, dark cloth, and "as well as my barometer". (Letter No. 15, The Letters of Gustaf Nordenskiöld Mesa Verde 1991.) He also says in the same letter that his father should answer by telegram whether he should remain where he is.

He worked with Wetherill, discoverer of the Mesa Verde cliff dwellings in 1888, and Charles Mason. The Wetherills led Nordenskiöld through the canyons and sandstone cliffs of the Mesa Verde cliff dwellings where he applied his European scientific training, conducting the first archaeological excavation of the cliff dwellings. Nordenskiöld employed Wetherill to supervise excavations at Mesa Verde and trained Wetherill in a number of techniques, such as how to use a trowel (he had been using a shovel). Nordenskiöld explained to Wetherill the importance of documentation.

== Arrest and exoneration ==
In the late 19th century, there were no laws against treasure-hunting or selling artifacts in Colorado; in addition to the ever-present threat of vandalism and looting, scholars and tourists alike had the habit of taking valuable items from Mesa Verde as trophies. In this climate, Nordenskiöld loaded Mesa Verde artifacts into Denver and Rio Grande Western Railroad boxcars in Durango, Colorado, and headed for Europe, with most of the items eventually ending up at the National Museum of Finland.

Nordenskiöld biographers Judith Reynolds and David Reynolds describe the ensuing situation as an "international incident." Angry locals charged Nordenskiöld with "devastating the ruins" and had him arrested at midnight at the Strater Hotel even though there were no laws at the time supporting such a charge. In addition to the issue of removing artifacts, xenophobia may have played a role in Nordenskiöld's arrest. In the December 9, 2005, Denver Post article, Electra Draper wrote: "...residents of Durango were beginning to think foreigners shouldn't be removing local artifacts." No intervention was taken against Americans who were also looting the sites.

When Nordenskiöld was arrested on 17 September 1891 he sent this telegram to his father: "much trouble some expense no danger" (original omits capitalization). Letter No. 31, The Letters of Gustaf Nordenskiöld Mesa Verde 1991.

In the end, Nordenskiöld took more than 150 photographs of Mesa Verde, and logged multiple sites.

Originally published in a Stockholm newspaper, and then later written in the preface to his 1892 book "From the Far West, Memories of America" Nordenskiöld states "The free roaming nomadic life, which this research forced me into, appealed greatly to my spirit and created a desire for excursions farther into the deserts of the American West. I decided to go roaming on horseback with two companions through the northern part of Arizona." He made this trip, actually through Indian country in Colorado, Utah and Arizona, which went as far as the Grand Canyon. (Kungl. Boktryckeriet P.A. Norstedt & Soner Stockholm, 1892. In English, The Mesa Verde Museum Association, Mesa Verde National Park, CO 81330)

In 1893 he published one of the first books about Mesa Verde, The Cliff Dwellers of Mesa Verde, Southwestern Colorado: Their Pottery and Implements, a monumental report of his excavations, describing in detail the buildings, pottery, skeletal remains, and tools found at the sites.

A full rendering of Gustaf Nordenskiöld's book in the 1893 version (see pg. v) is here http://babel.hathitrust.org/cgi/pt?id=inu.30000029476458. (Courtesy of the Hilthi Trust Digital Library, University of Michigan Library.)

After his return from America, Nordenskiöld occupied himself with mineralogical studies, but his health started to deteriorate again in 1894. He died on June 6, 1895, aboard a train traveling to Jämtland, only 27 years old.

As he predeceased his father the Baron, he did not inherit the family title, which therefore passed to his brother Erland, on the death of their father, in 1901.

== Archives and collections ==
Nordenskiöld's collections from Mesa Verde were bought by a Finnish collector who eventually donated them to the University of Helsinki. They are now held by the National Museum of Finland and were on display at the Museum of Cultures in the Tennispalatsi building in central Helsinki, as part of the collection called "Fetched from Afar" (Kaukaa Haettua) until 19 May 2013. The Royal Swedish Academy of Sciences contains an archive of photographs, notes, correspondence and newspaper clippings. The Riksarkivet includes letters to his father from Washington, Philadelphia, Charleston, Mammoth Cave (in Kentucky), Durango, Navajo Canyon, and other locations.

== Publications ==
- From the Far West, Memories of America. G. Nordenskiold. Translated by Larry E. Scott and Kent R. Olson. Reprinted 2010, East Hall Press, Augustana College. Originally published in 1892 as Från Fjärran Västern, Minnen från Amerika in Stockholm by P. A. Norstedt & Söners. ISBN 1878326171
- The Cliff Dwellers of the Mesa Verde, Southwestern Colorado: Their Pottery and Implements. Appendix: Human remains from the Cliff Dwellings of the Mesa Verde. G. Nordenskiold. Translated by D. L. Morgan. Reprinted 2017 by FB&C Limited. Originally published in 1893 as Ruiner af Klippboningar i Mesa Verde's Cañons in Stockholm by P. A. Norstedt & Söners. ISBN 0265584868
- The Letters of Gustaf Nordenskiold - with Articles from Ymer and Photographic Times. Publisher: Mesa Verde Museum Association in 1991. ISBN 0937062162.

== See also ==
- Adolf Erik Nordenskiöld
- Erland Nordenskiöld
