= List of glaciers in Greenland =

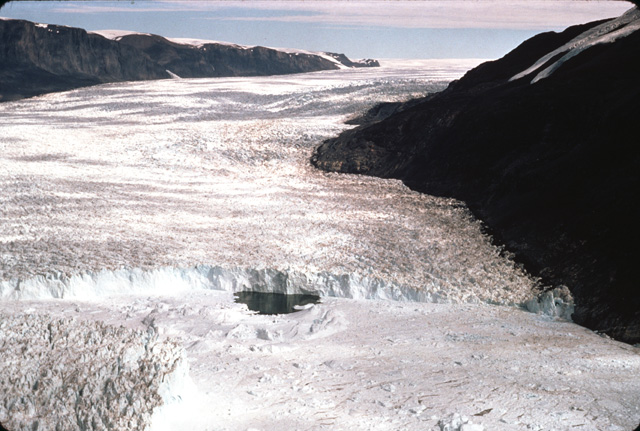
Rink Glacier, west Greenland

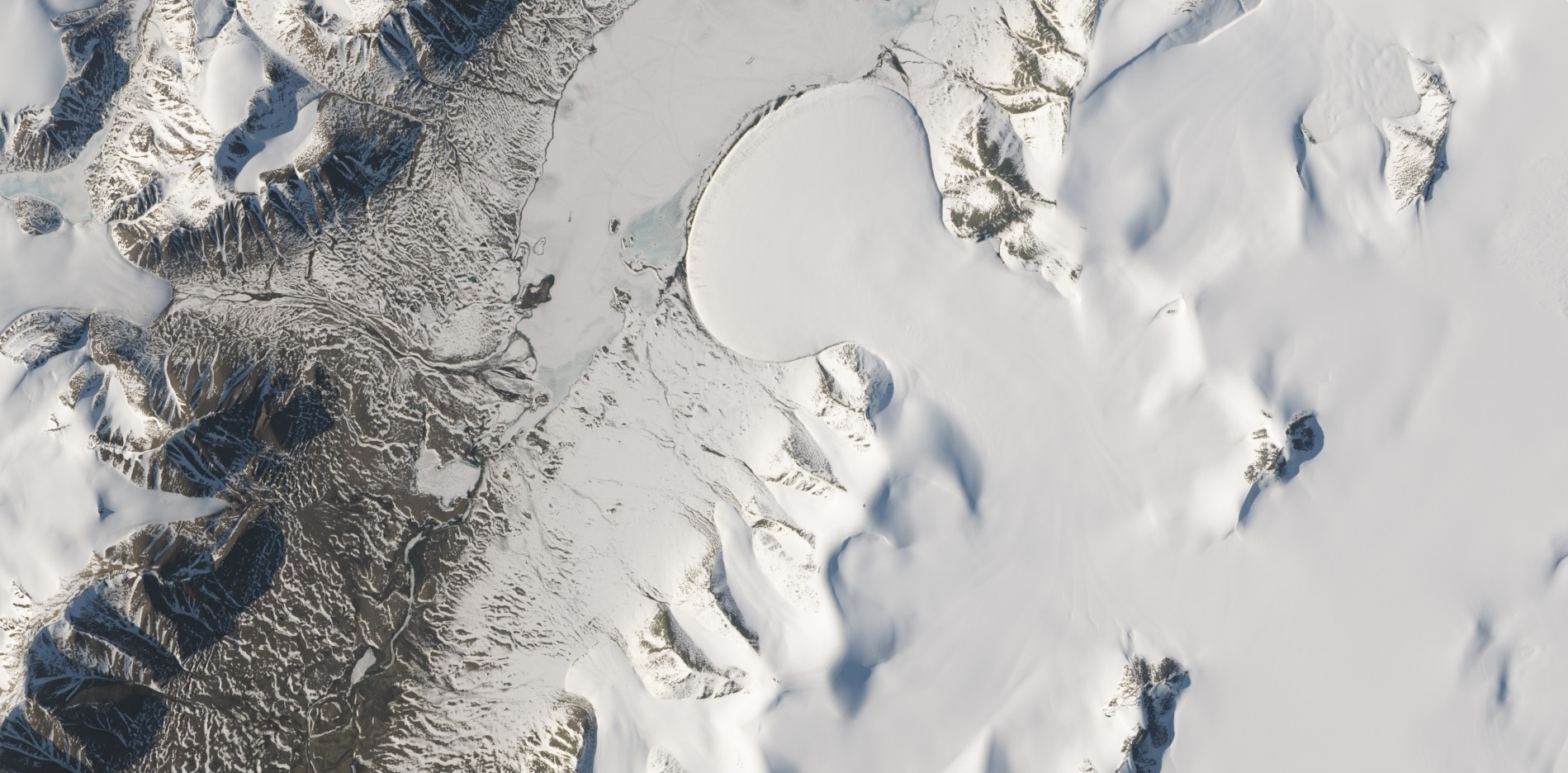
NASA picture of the southern part of Romer Lake with the Elephant Foot Glacier.

This is a list of glaciers in Greenland. Details on the size and flow of some of the major Greenlandic glaciers are listed by Eric Rignot and Pannir Kanagaratnam (2006)

== Ice sheets and caps ==
- Greenland Ice Sheet
- Ad Astra Ice Cap
- Christian Erichsen Ice Cap
- Flade Isblink
- Geikie Plateau
- Gungner Ice Cap
- Hans Tausen Ice Cap
- Heimdal Ice Cap
- Hurlbut Glacier
- Ismarken
- Mælkevejen
- Maniitsoq Ice Cap (Sukkertoppen)
- Storm Ice Cap
- Upper Frederiksborg Glacier

== Other glaciers ==
- A. Harmsworth Glacier
- Aage Bertelsen Glacier
- Academy Glacier, N
- Academy Glacier, NW
- Admiralty Glacier
- Adolf Hoel Glacier
- Akuliarutsip Sermerssua
- Amdrup Glacier
- Apusiaajik Glacier
- Balder Glacier
- Bernstorff Glacier
- Borgjokel
- Bowdoin Glacier
- Bredebræ
- Britannia Glacier
- Bruckner Glacier
- C. H. Ostenfeld Glacier
- Chamberlin Glacier
- Christian IV Glacier
- Copeland Glacier (Pasterze Glacier)
- Daugaard-Jensen Glacier
- Diebitsch Glacier
- Docker Smith Glacier
- Dodge Glacier
- Ejnar Mikkelsen Glacier
- F. Graae Glacier
- Fan Glacier
- Farquhar Glacier
- Fenris Glacier
- Fimbul Glacier
- Frederiksborg Glacier
- Frederikshåb Glacier
- Gade Glacier
- Garm (glacier)
- Gerard de Geer Glacier
- Gerd Glacier
- Guldfaxe
- Gymer Glacier
- Hagen Glacier
- Hamberg Glacier
- Hann Glacier
- Hans Glacier
- Harald Moltke Glacier
- Hart Glacier
- Hayes Glacier
- Heilprin Glacier
- Heim Glacier
- Heimdal Glacier
- Helheim Glacier
- Helland Glacier
- Henson Glacier
- Hiawatha Glacier
- Hubbard Glacier
- Humboldt Glacier
- Hutchinson Glacier
- Igdlugdlip Glacier
- Ikertivaq Glacier
- Ingia Glacier
- J.P. Koch Glacier
- Jætte Glacier
- Jakobshavn Isbræ
- Kangerlussuaq Glacier
- Kangerdlugssup Glacier
- Kangerdluarssup Sermia
- Kangiata Nunata Sermia
- Karale Glacier
- Knud Rasmussen Glacier
- King Oscar Glacier
- Kjer Glacier
- K.J.V. Steenstrup Glacier
- Kofoed-Hansen Glacier
- Kronborg Glacier
- L. Bistrup Bræ Glacier
- Leidy Glacier
- Lille Glacier
- Marie Sophie Glacier
- Melville Glacier
- Midgard Glacier
- Mittivakkat Glacier
- Mohn Glacier
- Moore Glacier
- Morris Jesup Glacier
- Nansen Glacier
- Nioghalvfjerdsbræ
- Nordenskiöld Glacier NW
- Nordenskiöld Glacier W
- Nunatak Glacier
- Nunatakavsaup Glacier
- Nunatakassaap Sermia
- Nyeboe Glacier
- Peary Glacier
- Perdlerfiup Sermia
- Petermann Glacier
- Puisortoq
- Raven Glacier
- Rimfaxe
- Rink Glacier
- Rink Glacier (Melville Bay)
- Rosenborg Glacier
- Russell Glacier
- Ryder Glacier
- Salisbury Glacier
- Scarlet Heart Glacier
- Sermeq Avannarleq near Ilulissat
- Sermeq Avannarleq in Uummannaq District
- Sermeq Silardleq
- Sermilik Qagssimiut
- Sermitsiaq Glacier
- Sharp Glacier
- Sif Glacier
- Skinfaxe
- Sleipner Glacier
- Spalte Glacier
- Steensby Glacier
- Steenstrup Glacier
- Storstrømmen Glacier
- Store Glacier
- Storebjørn Glacier
- Sun Glacier
- Sverdrup Glacier
- Thomas Glacier
- Tingmjarmiut
- Tjalfe Glacier (SE Greenland)
- Tjalfe Glacier
- Tjasse Glacier
- Tracy Glacier
- Upernavik Isstrøm
- Umiamako Glacier
- Verhoeff Glacier
- Vibeke Glacier
- Waltershausen Glacier
- Wordie Glacier
- Ydun Glacier
- Ygdrasil
- Ymer Glacier
- Zachariæ Isstrøm

== Firns ==
- Daniel Bruun Firn
- Dreyer Firn
- Rink Firn
- Sven Hedin Firn

== See also ==
- List of glaciers
- List of fjords of Greenland
