= Hinksland =

Peninsula in Greenland

- Location within Greenland

Geography
- Location: East Greenland
- Coordinates: 71°43′N 28°19′W
- Adjacent to: Nordvestfjord; Flyver Fjord
- Length: 64 km (39.8 mi)
- Width: 41 km (25.5 mi)
- Highest elevation: 2,316 m (7598 ft)
- Highest point: Hinksland HP

Administration
- Greenland (Denmark)
- Zone: Northeast Greenland National Park

Hinksland (Danish: Hinksland) is a peninsula in eastern Greenland. It is a part of the Northeast Greenland National Park.

The peninsula is named after Arthur R. Hinks, Secretary of the Royal Geographical Society, 1915–45.

== Geography ==
Hinksland is limited to the northwest by the Daugaard-Jensen Glacier, beyond which lies Charcot Land, to the northeast by the Nordvestfjord of the Scoresby Sound and to the south by the 2-kilometre-wide (1.2 mi) Flyver Fjord. To the southwest the peninsula is attached to the mainland. The Renland peninsula lies to the southeast, beyond Th. Sørensen Land and Nathorst Land to the north, across the Nordvestfjord. The highest point of the peninsula is a 700-metre-high (2,297 ft) mountain located in the southern part rising above the Flyver Fjord.

Geologically Hinksland is part of the Vestfjord-Hinksland gneiss and schist zone crystalline complex.

Hinksland is at the southern limit of the eastern coastal area of the Northeast Greenland National Park. Constable Point (Nerlerit Inaat) is the closest airport.

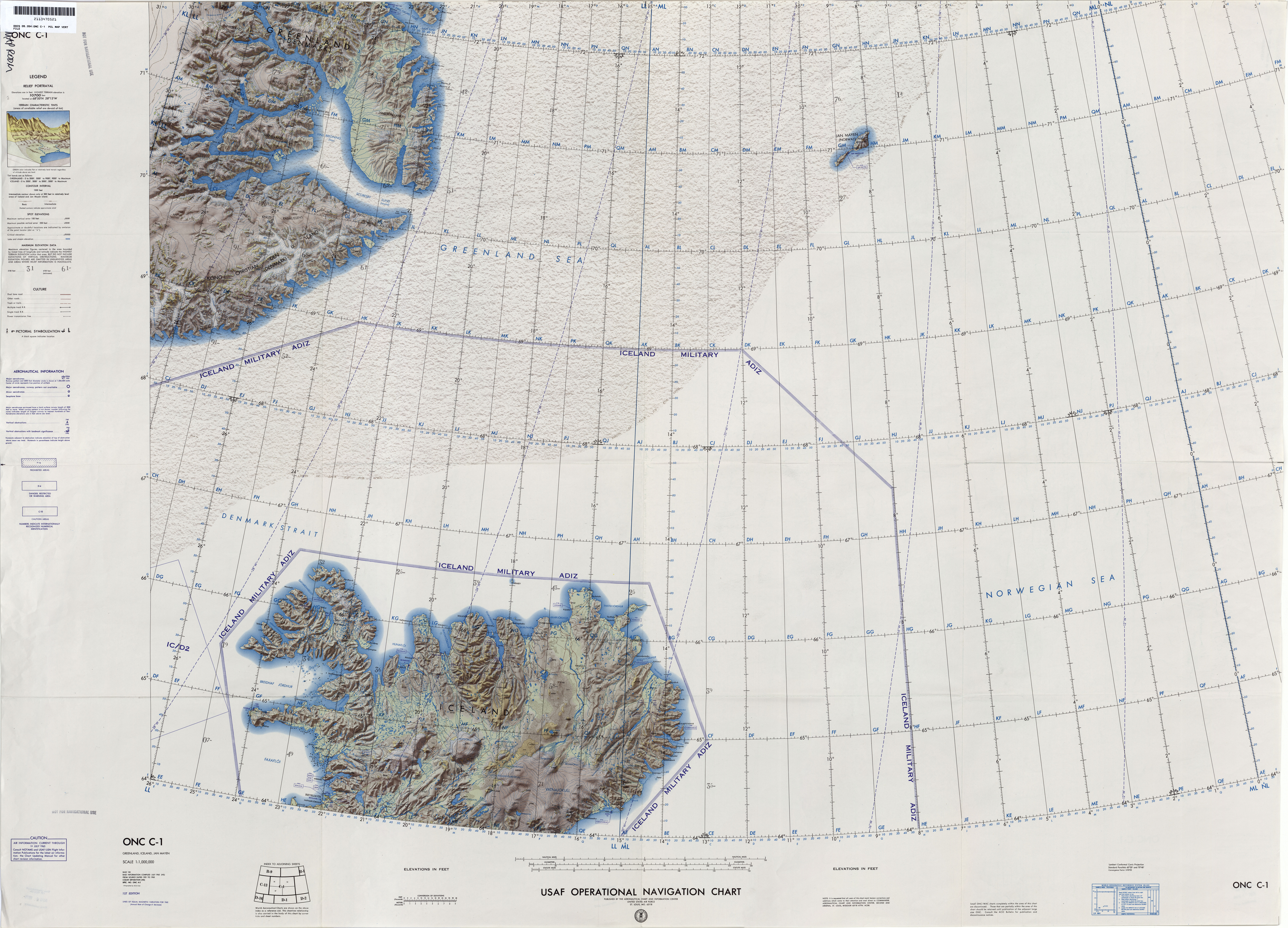
Map of NE Greenland and Iceland.

== See also ==
- Renland
- Milneland
