= Th. Sørensen Land =

- Region
- Location of Th. Sørensen Land
- Country: Greenland
- Zone: Northeast Greenland National Park

Dimensions
  - Length: 50 km (31 mi)
  - Width: 20 km (12 mi)

Th. Sørensen Land is an area in King Christian X Land, Eastern Greenland, part of the inner Scoresby Sound system. Administratively it lies in the Northeast Greenland National Park zone. The area is remote and uninhabited.

Th. Sørensen Land was named during the 1971 Northern Universities expedition after Danish botanist Thorvald Sørensen (1902–1973) who published the botanical research of the Three-year Expedition to East Greenland.

== Geography ==
Th. Sørensen Land is a mountainous region. It is bound to the north by Flyver Fjord, a branch of Nordvestfjord, beyond which lies Hinksland. To the southeast it is separated from Renland by the Edvard Bay Valley. Its easternmost point is a headland jutting out into the right bank of the Nordvestfjord. Nathorst Land lies to the northeast in the opposite shore.

There are several glaciers in Th. Sørensen Land, such as the Eielson Glacier and the Vindue Glacier. Further to the northwest flows the Freuchen Glacier. To the west rise the Royston Nunataks, and beyond them the Greenland ice sheet.

== Bibliography ==
- A. K. Higgins, Jane A. Gilotti, M. Paul Smith (eds.), The Greenland Caledonides: Evolution of the Northeast Margin of Laurentia.
