= Ingia Glacier =

Glacier in Greenland

- Inngia Isbræ
- Animation with the Ingia Glacier in the background —at the center of the picture— and the Umiamako Glacier before it.

- Location within Greenland
- Location: Avannaata, Greenland
- Coordinates: 72°8′N 52°27′W
- Terminus: Karrat Fjord, Baffin Bay, North Atlantic Ocean

Ingia Glacier (Danish: Inngia Isbræ), is a glacier in Avannaata Municipality, West Greenland.

== Geography ==
It is a marine terminating glacier outlet of the western side of the Greenland Ice Sheet. Its terminus is in the Inngia Fjord, a branch of the Karrat Fjord, Nordost Bay, Baffin Bay, North Atlantic Ocean.

The Ingia Glacier flows in a NNE / SSW direction, bending roughly southwestwards shortly before its terminus.

== See also ==
- List of glaciers in Greenland
