= Nordvestfjord =

Fjord in Greenland

- Kangertertivarmît Kangertivat (Greenlandic)
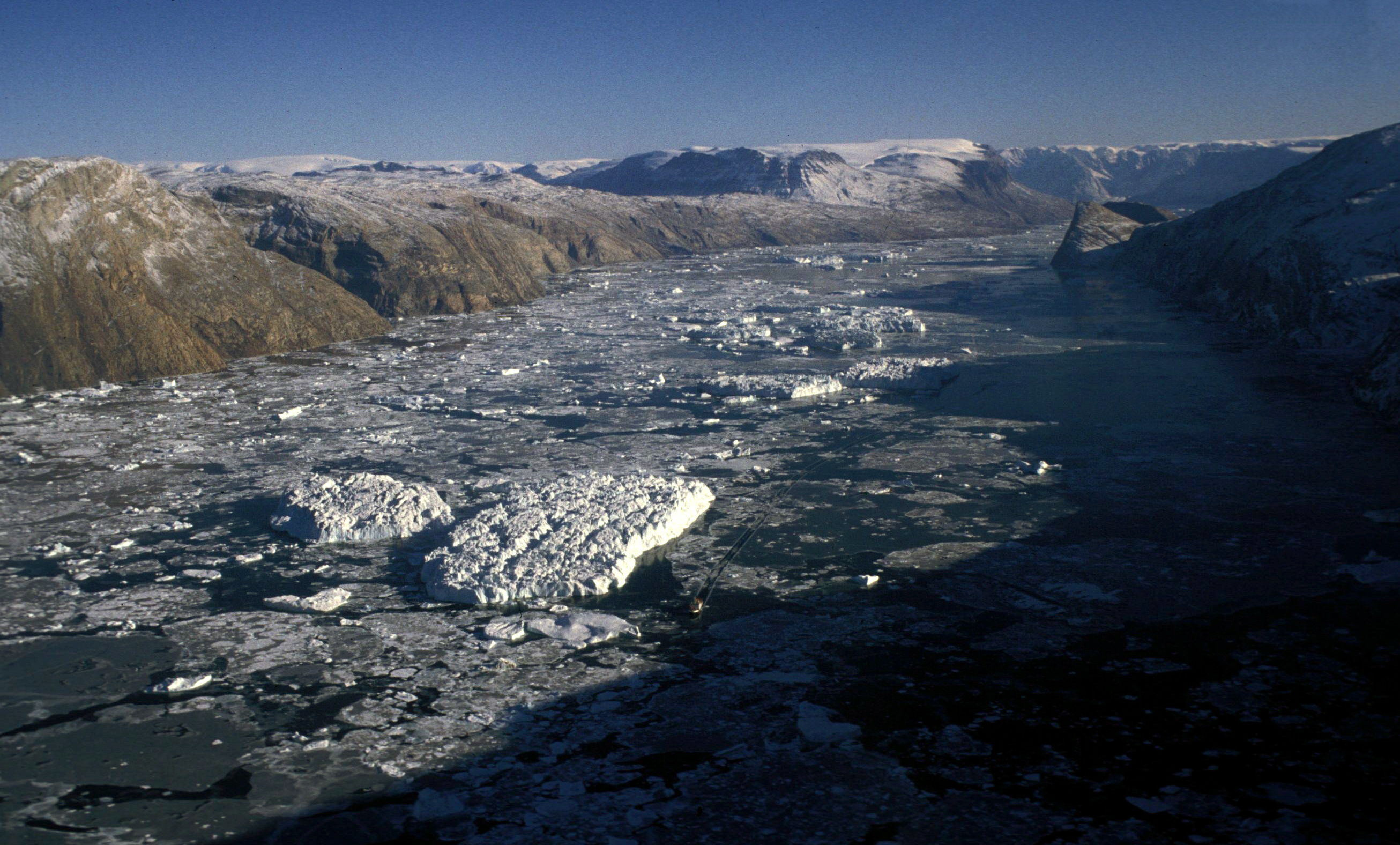
- View of the Daugaard-Jensen Glacier calving area at the head of the fjord.

- Location in Greenland
- Location: Arctic
- Coordinates: 71°40′N 27°17′W
- Ocean/sea sources: Scoresby Sound; Greenland Sea
- Basin countries: Greenland
- Max. length: 150 km (93 mi)
- Max. width: 6 km (3.7 mi)
- Average depth: 1,500 m (4,900 ft)

Nordvestfjord, meaning 'Northwest Fjord', (Greenlandic: Kangertertivarmît Kangertivat) is a fjord in King Christian X Land, eastern Greenland.

Administratively most of its length lies in the Northeast Greenland National Park area, at the border of Sermersooq municipality. This fjord is part of the Scoresby Sound system. The distance from the head of Nordvestfjord across Hall Bredning to the mouth of Scoresby Sound is 313 km (194 mi), which makes this continuous stretch of water the longest fjord in the world.

== History ==
The Nordvestfjord fjord was named by Carl Ryder during his 1891–92 expedition because of its approximate northwestern direction. Ryder, however, was prevented from exploring it because it was already September, new ice was forming, and a very strong wind was blowing from the interior of the fjord.

== Geography ==
This long and very deep fjord is the northernmost arm of the Scoresby Sound. It is mostly surrounded by high mountains, whose sides rise steeply from its shore. Part of its northern flank marks the southern boundary of Nathorst Land and the Stauning Alps. To the northeast the fjord is bound by Scoresby Land, to the northwest by Charcot Land, and to the southwest by Hinksland, Th. Sørensen Land and Renland.

The Nordvestfjord winds its way roughly in a NW/SE direction. Its largest branch is the Flyver Fjord, which runs in a roughly west–east direction and joins the southwestern shore about midway through the fjord.

The fjord is fed by several glaciers. The Daugaard-Jensen Glacier is at the fjord's head flowing from the southwest and producing masses of icebergs. The mouth is located close to the mouth of Ofjord, between the Bjorne Islands to the southwest and South Cape (Sydkap) to the northeast, beyond which lies Northeast Bay (Nordøstbugt).

=== Glaciers, fjords and bays ===
From head to mouth:

- Daugaard-Jensen Glacier
- Fjord branch on the left bank
  - F. Graae Glacier (Nord Glacier)
  - "Charcot Glacier", a glacier flowing eastwards, to the southwest of F. Graae Glacier. The use of the name was discontinued because the name had been previously given to a glacier on Milne Land. This glacier currently has no name.
- Hammerskjøld Glacier, Leicester Bay on the right bank
- Flyver Fjord, in the area of Leeds Bay and Lancaster Bay on the right bank
- Edvard Bay on the right bank
- Unnamed glacier on the right bank
- North Bay (Nordbugten) on the left bank
- Unnamed glacier on the left bank
- Snyder Bay on the left bank
  - Borgbjerg Glacier with Bacchus Glacier
- Triton Glacier and Neptunus Glacier (Løberengletscher) on the left bank
- Oxford Glacier on the left bank

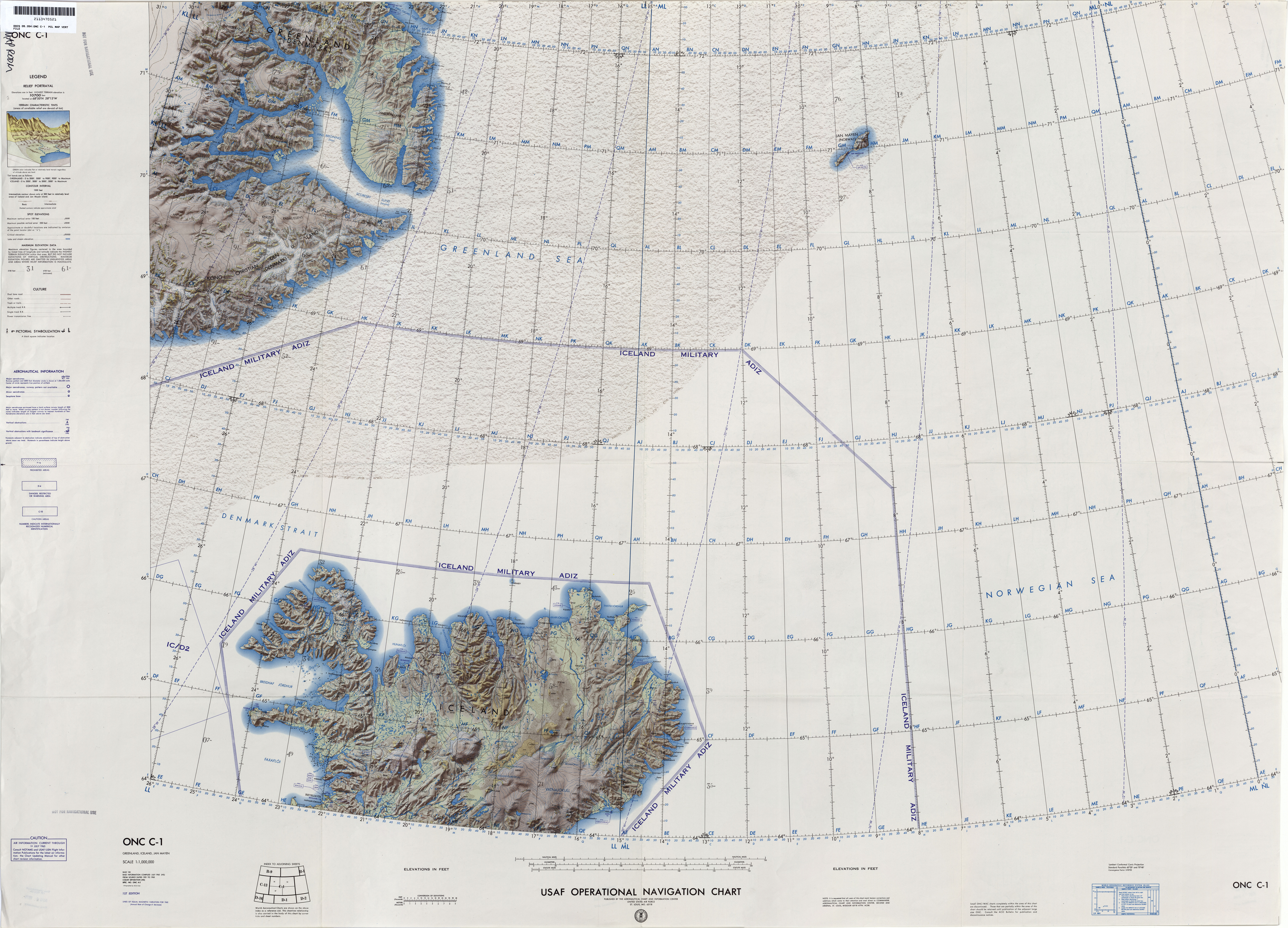
Map of NE Greenland and Iceland.

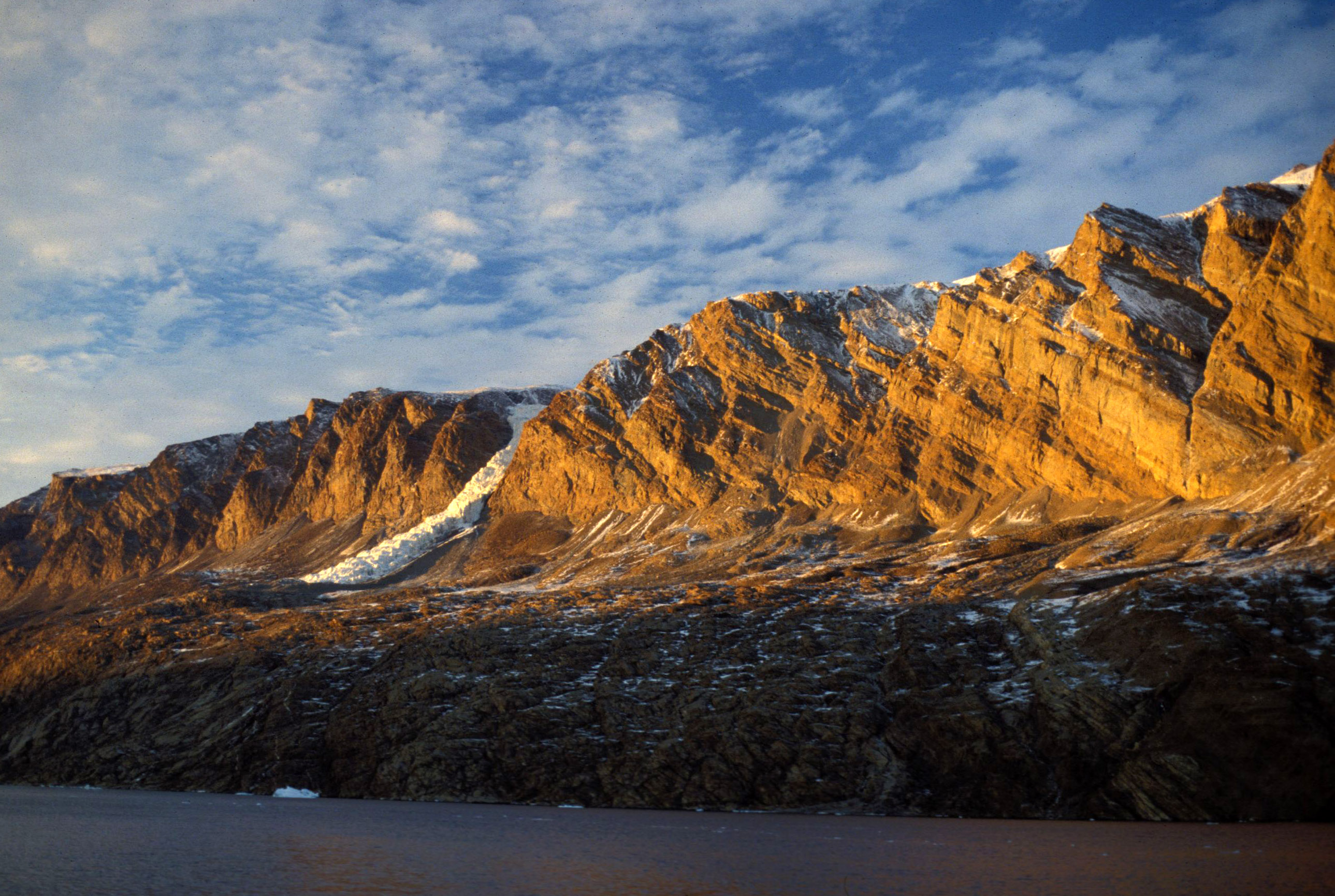
Mountainside glacier tongue above the Nordvestfjord shore.

== See also ==
- List of fjords of Greenland
