= Daugaard-Jensen Glacier =

Glacier in Greenland

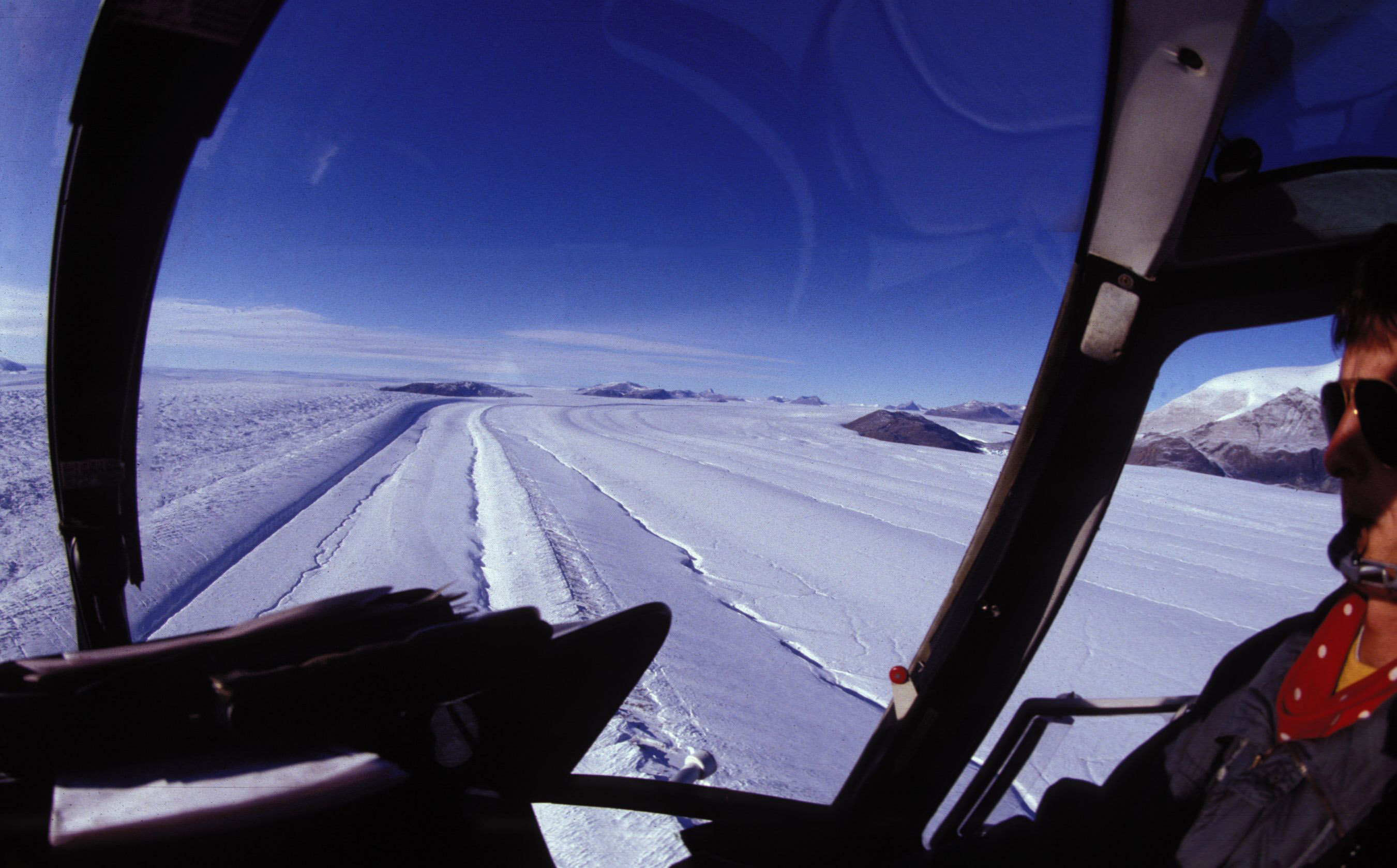
- Photograph of Daugaard-Jensen Glacier taken from a helicopter.

- Location within Greenland
- Location: Greenland
- Coordinates: 71°46′N 29°15′W
- Area: 50,150 km^{2} (19,360 sq mi)
- Terminus: Nordvestfjord, Greenland Sea

The Daugaard-Jensen Glacier is a large glacier located on the southeast coast of Greenland.

The glacier was first mapped in 1933 by Lauge Koch during aerial surveys made during the 1931–34 Three-year Expedition to East Greenland (Treårsekspeditionen). It is named in honour of Niels Daugaard-Jensen, who was head of the Greenland department under the Danish Ministry of State and former governor (Landsfoged) of Northern Greenland.

== Geography ==
Located in the northwestern side of Hinksland and south of Charcot Land, it drains an area of 50,150 km^{2} of the Greenland Ice Sheet with a flux (quantity of ice moved from the land to the sea) of 10.5 km^{3} per year, as measured for 1996.

With its terminus in the Nordvestfjord of the Scoresby Sound, it is one of the main producers of icebergs to the north of Iceland. In an original docuseries of Alex Honnold on National Geographic it is mentioned that measurements of the glacier have shown that it is stable despite global warming.

== See also ==
- List of glaciers in Greenland
