= Oxford Glacier =

Glacier in East Greenland

Oxford Glacier (71°26′31.78″N 25°20′17.88″W) is a glacier in the southern Stauning Alps of East Greenland. It is located close to the entrance to the Holger Danskes Briller trough and near Stormpynt, on the north shore of Nordvestfjord. On older maps it is referred to as Uranus Glacier. It was named in recognition of the work of the Oxford University Expedition to East Greenland 1962 A party of four (David Sugden, Brian John, Sandy Hall and Svend Wurm) spent part of August 1962 on a reconnaissance survey of the glacier, which at that time was not heavily crevassed apart from one distinct icefall. In their glaciological studies they noticed ice temperature anomalies which were difficult to explain. They did not know it at the time, but they had discovered some of the earliest evidence of surging behaviour.

Two climbing parties, one in 1976 and the other in 2013, found that the glacier was heavily crevassed and impassable in places. The neighbouring glacier, Løberen, is renowned as one of the fastest-flowing surging glaciers in Greenland.
