= Cape Murdoch (Greenland) =

Headland in Avannaata, Greenland

Cape Murdoch Kap Murdoch
- Cape
- Coordinates: 76°8′9″N 61°53′38″W
- Location: Avannaata, Greenland
- Offshore water bodies: Melville Bay; Baffin Bay

Area
  - Total: Arctic
- Elevation: 480 m (1,570 ft)

Cape Murdoch (Danish: Kap Murdoch) is a headland in the Avannaata municipality, NW Greenland.

== Geography ==
Cape Murdoch is located at the southern end of an unnamed island north of Heilprin Island in Melville Bay.

The cape lies in an area of small islands at the northern limits of Melville Bay to the west of the Fisher Islands and WNW of Thalbitzer Næs, near the terminuses of the Docker Smith Glacier and the Rink Glacier. The terminus of the Peary Glacier lies to the east.

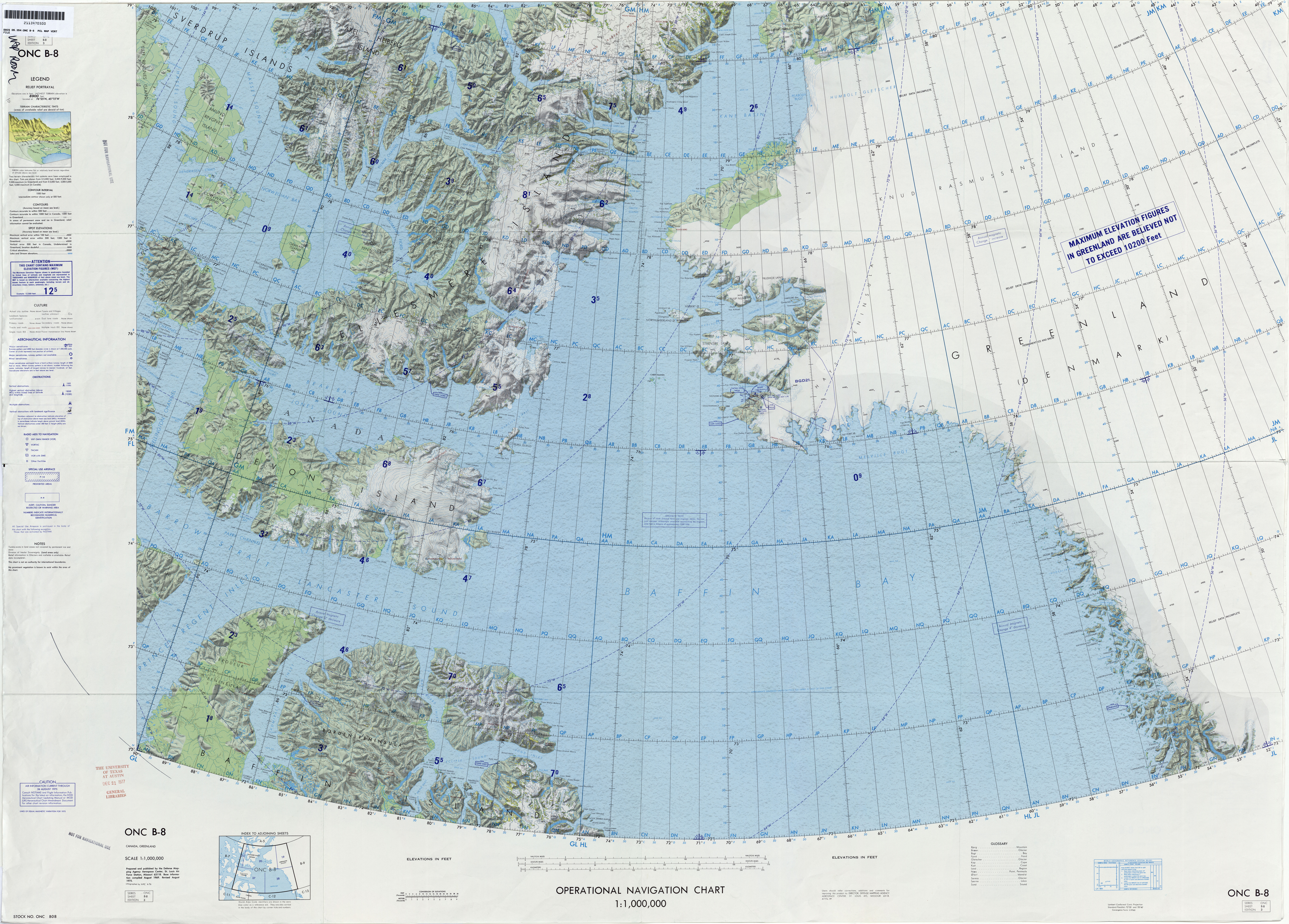
Map of Northwestern Greenland

== See also ==
- Cape York meteorite
