= August Nordenskiöld =

Finnish-Swedish alchemist and slavery critic

August Nordenskiöld or Nordenskjöld (6 February 1754 in Sipoo, Finland – 10 December 1792 in Sierra Leone, Africa) was a Finnish-Swedish alchemist and Swedenborgian critic of slavery.

Nordenskiöld was the son of Carl Fredric Nordenskiöld and Märta Nordenskiöld, born Ramsay, and brother of Swedish Admiral Otto Henrik Nordenskiöld (1747–1842). He was educated at Turku before moving to Stockholm where he was influenced by Swedenborgianism. He was supported by the king of Sweden, Gustav III, in his efforts to find the Philosopher's Stone, in order to create gold. In 1782 he led Sweden's mining operations in Finland. He was also involved in an attempt, supported by Gustav III, to found an anti-slavery colony on the west coast of Africa. Nordenskiöld died in a violent clash between locals in Sierra Leone, where he had moved.

His nephew, Adolf Erik Nordenskiöld, was an Arctic explorer.

== Works ==
- Försök til en chemisk och metallurgisk afhandling, Turku 1772
- Oneiromantien; eller konsten at tyda drömar. Förra delen, Stockholm 1783
- Oneiromantien; eller konsten at tyda drömar. Andra delen, Stockholm 1783
- An ADDRESS to the True MEMBERS of the NEW JERUSALEM CHURCH, London 1789
- Församlings formen uti det Nya Jerusalem, af August Nordenskjöld Jesu Christi ringaste tiänare, Kjöpenhamn 1790
- (with Carl Bernhard Wadström and others) Plan for a Free Community at Sierra Leone, 1792
