= Otto Martin Torell =

Swedish geologist (1828–1900)

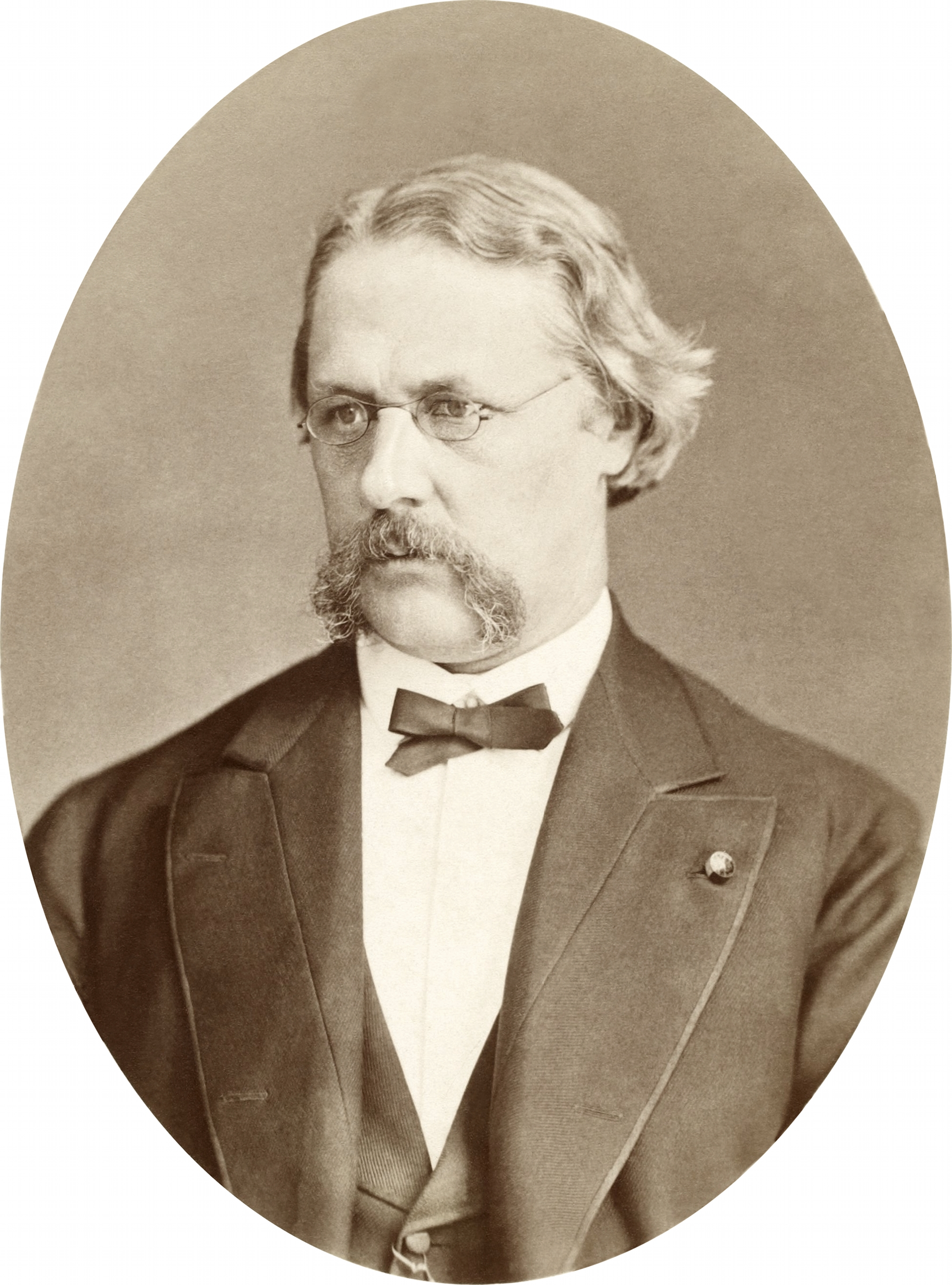
Otto Torell

Prof Otto Martin Torell HFRSE (born June 5, 1828, in Varberg; died September 11, 1900, Stockholm) was a pioneering Swedish geologist. He was also a zoologist, botanist, glaciologist, and polar explorer.

== Life ==
Torell was born in Varberg, Sweden on 5 June 1828 the son of Johan Petter Torell and his wife, Susanna Charlotta Varenius. He was educated at Lund University for the medical profession, but became interested in zoological and geological studies, and being of independent means he devoted himself to science.

Torell gave his attention first especially to the invertebrate fauna and the physical changes of pleistocene and recent times. In 1850 he applied Louis Agassiz's theory on ice ages to explain his observations of arctic molluscs on the coast of Sweden. From 1856 to 1859 he studied the glacial phenomena of Switzerland, Iceland, Spitzbergen and Greenland, and in 1861 made the first of two Arctic expeditions to the Polar sea in company with Adolf Erik Nordenskiöld. In 1865 he visited the Netherlands to investigate the strange rock formations and to explore the possibility of answering the prize contest set up by the Hollandsche Maatschappij der Wetenschappen since 1841 with the theme "What is to be thought of Agassiz's discovery that glacial moraines occur in Northern Europe far from present glaciers?". Since 1861 the question was broadened to include the question where the hondsrug rocks came from, and in 1867 Torell sent in a proposal to declare the rocks were transported by glaciers and was awarded the prize (a gold medal worth 400 guilders and cash to the amount of 150 guilders) but he never collected it, to the great frustration of the Haarlem Society's secretary, who sent him letters requesting his manuscript for publication. The 300 page manuscript was finally sent after Torell's death by the Swedish Geological survey, of which he had become director. His widow was awarded the prize posthumously.

In 1866, he became professor of zoology and geology in the University of Lund, and in 1871 he was appointed chief of the Geological Survey of Sweden. In the latter capacity he labored until 1897. His published contributions, though of much interest and importance, were not large, but his influence in promoting a knowledge of geology in Sweden was of great service. His Arctic experiences enabled him to interpret the method of origin of the drift deposits in northern Europe, and to show that they were largely of glacial or fluvio-glacial origin. In the English drifts he recognized many boulders of Scandinavian origin. He died on 11 September 1900.

Publications include: Bidrag till Spitsbergens molluskfauna (1859); and memoirs to accompany several sheets of the Geological Survey map of Sweden.

He was elected a member of the Royal Swedish Academy of Sciences in 1870.

He died in the suburbs of Stockholm on 11 September 1900.

== Publications ==
- The Swedish Expedition to Spitzbergen 1861 (1865)

== Family ==
He was married to Anna Elvira Beata Stromberg (b.1836). They had at least seven children, including Otto Martin Torell (1871-1954).
