= Rink Glacier (Melville Bay) =

Glacier in Greenland

- Rink Gletscher
- Location within Greenland
- Type: Tidewater glacier
- Location: NW Greenland
- Coordinates: 76°12′N 61°9′W
- Width: 6 km (3.7 mi)
- Terminus: Melville Bay
- Status: Retreating

Rink Glacier (Danish: Rink Gletscher), is a glacier in NW Greenland. Administratively it belongs to the Avannaata municipality.

This glacier was named after Danish geologist and explorer of Greenland Hinrich Johannes Rink (1819 - 1893).

== Geography ==
The Rink Glacier is located in the Lauge Koch Coast, Melville Bay. It originates in the western Greenland ice sheet and flows southwestwards between the Døcker Smith Glacier to the west and the Peary Glacier to the east. Its terminus lies ENE of Cape Murdoch, northeast of the Fisher Islands and north of the Balgoni Islands in Melville Bay.

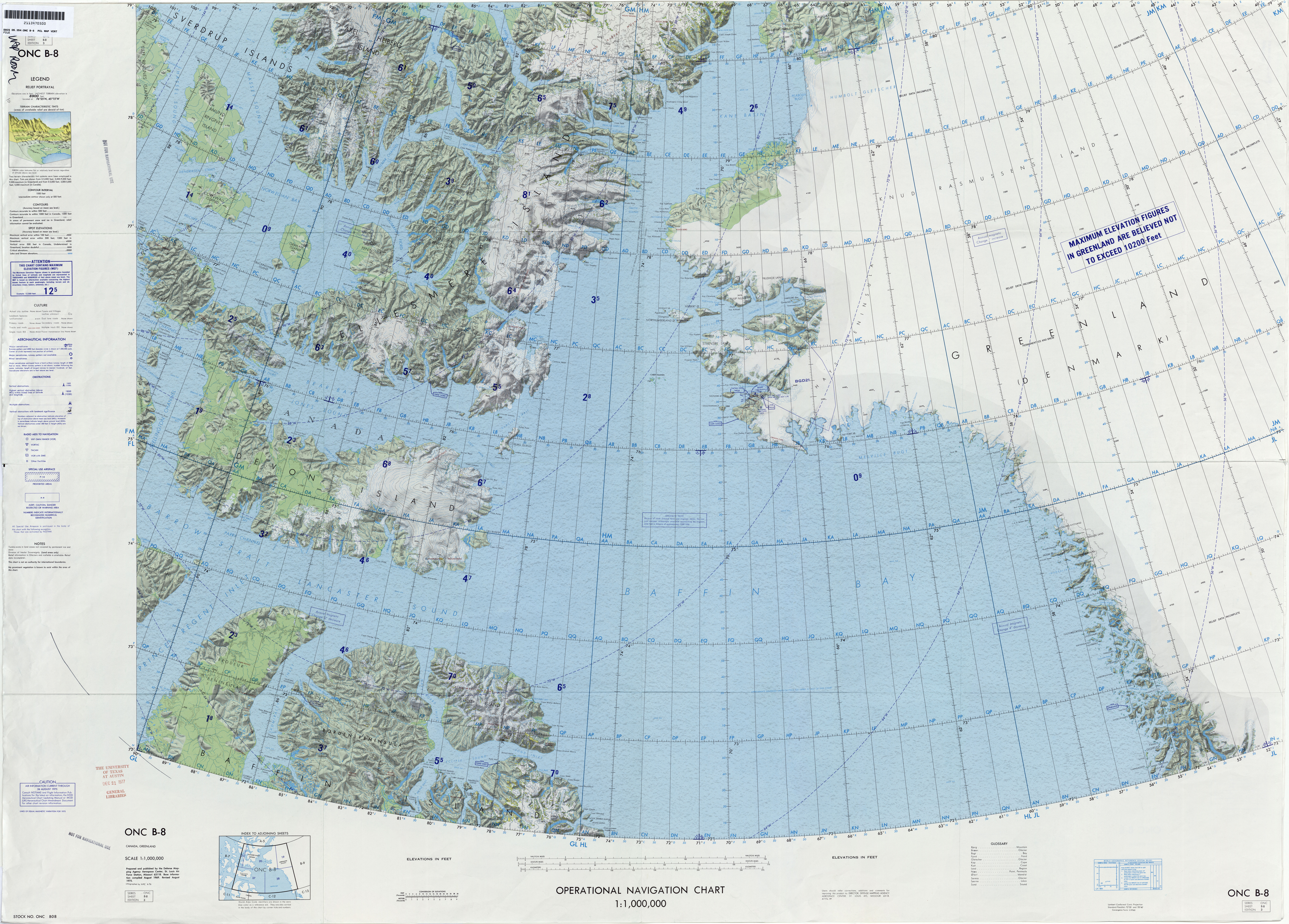
Map of Northwestern Greenland

== See also ==
- List of glaciers in Greenland
