= King Oscar Glacier =

Glacier in Greenland

- Kong Oscar Gletscher
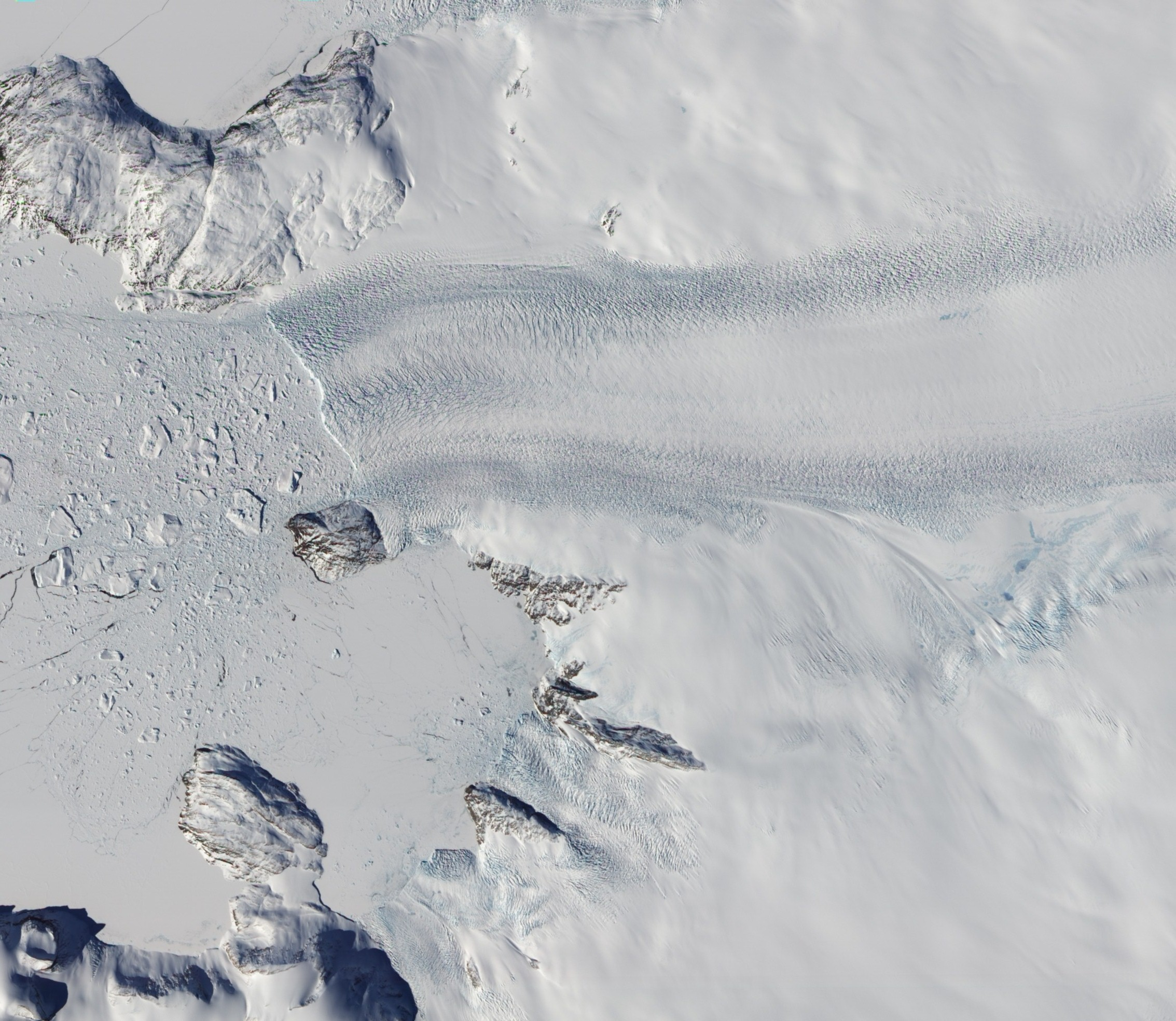
- Natural-colour image showing the heavily crevassed terminus of the King Oscar Glacier.

- Location within Greenland
- Type: Tidewater glacier
- Location: Greenland
- Coordinates: 76.03°N 59.67°W
- Area: 21,134 km^{2} (8,200 sq mi)
- Terminus: Melville Bay
- Status: Retreating

King Oscar Glacier (Danish: Kong Oscar Gletscher) is a large glacier in the Avannaata Municipality, on the northwestern coast of Greenland.

== Geography ==
The King Oscar Glacier is one of several glaciers that drain the north-western part of the Greenland Ice Sheet into Melville Bay. It flows roughly southwestwards between the Peary Glacier to the northwest and the Nordenskiold Glacier to the southeast.

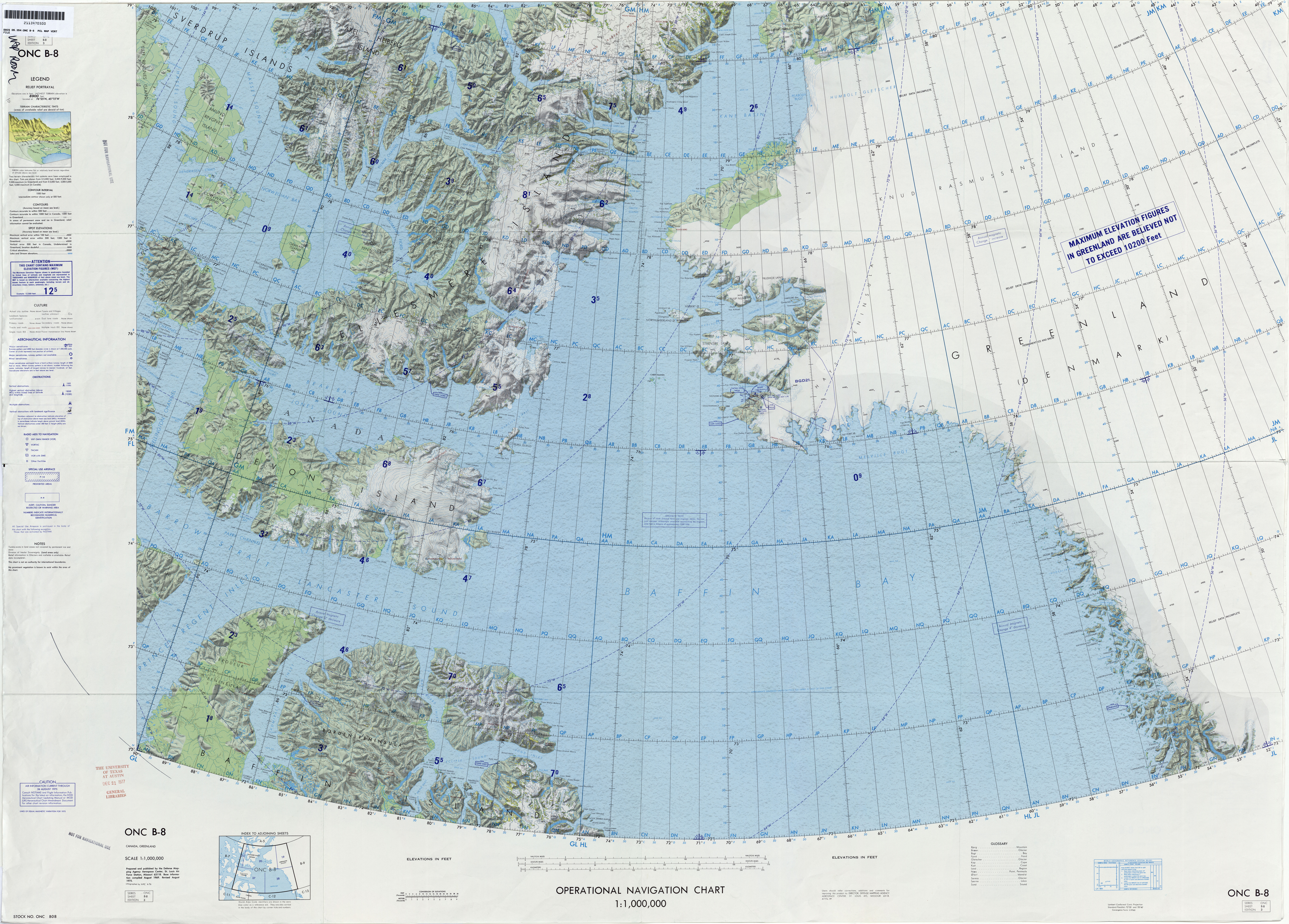
Map of Northwestern Greenland

== Status ==
As part of a comprehensive survey of Greenland's glaciers that was published in 2006, scientists documented that the mass balance—the sum of gains through snow accumulation and losses through iceberg calving and melting—of Kong Oscar and Greenland's other north-western glaciers was strongly negative between 1996 and 2005: they lost more ice than they gained. The pattern was similar to the ice sheet as a whole, which has been losing ice mass at an accelerating pace in the past decade.

== See also ==
- List of glaciers in Greenland
