= Karale Glacier =

Glacier in Greenland

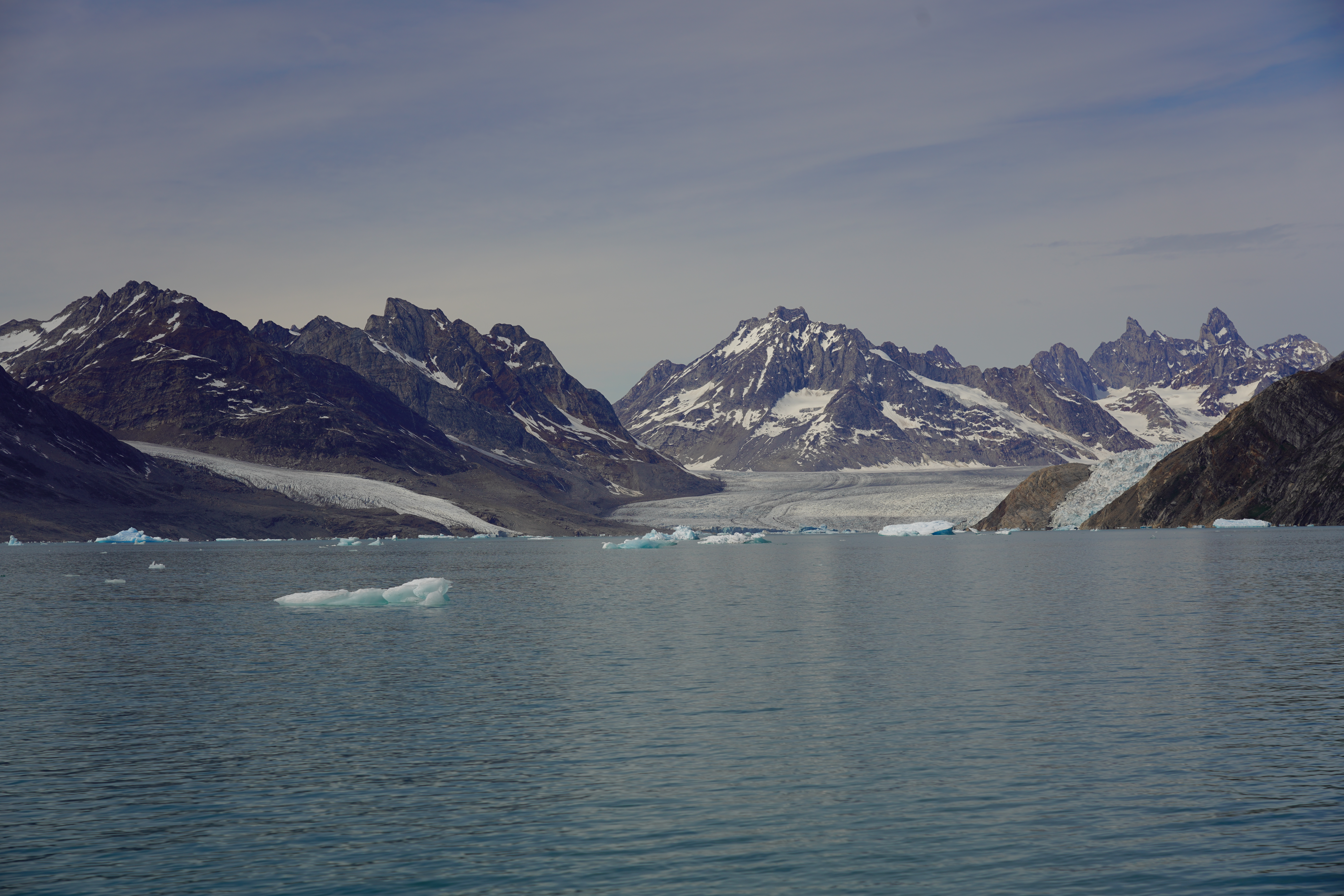

- Location within Greenland
- Location: Greenland
- Coordinates: 66.13°N 36.81°W
- Area: around 60 square kilometres (23 mi^{2})

The Karale Glacier is one of the major glaciers in the area north of Kuummiit in Eastern Greenland. It began to recede around 1990.

== See also ==
- List of glaciers in Greenland
