= Peary Glacier =

Glacier in north west Greenland

- Peary Gletscher
- Location within Greenland
- Type: Tidewater glacier
- Location: NW Greenland
- Coordinates: 76°7′N 60°28′W
- Width: 6 km (3.7 mi)
- Terminus: Melville Bay
- Status: Retreating

Peary Glacier (Danish: Peary Gletscher), is a glacier in north west Greenland. Administratively it belongs to the Avannaata municipality.

This glacier was named after US Arctic explorer Robert Peary (1856 - 1920).

== Geography ==
The Peary Glacier is located in the Lauge Koch Coast, Melville Bay. It originates in the western Greenland ice sheet and flows southwestwards between the Rink Glacier to the northwest and the King Oscar Glacier to the southeast. Its terminus lies east of Cape Murdoch, northeast of the Balgoni Islands and Thalbitzer Næs in Melville Bay. Unlike the neighboring King Oscar Glacier, it does not produce many icebergs.

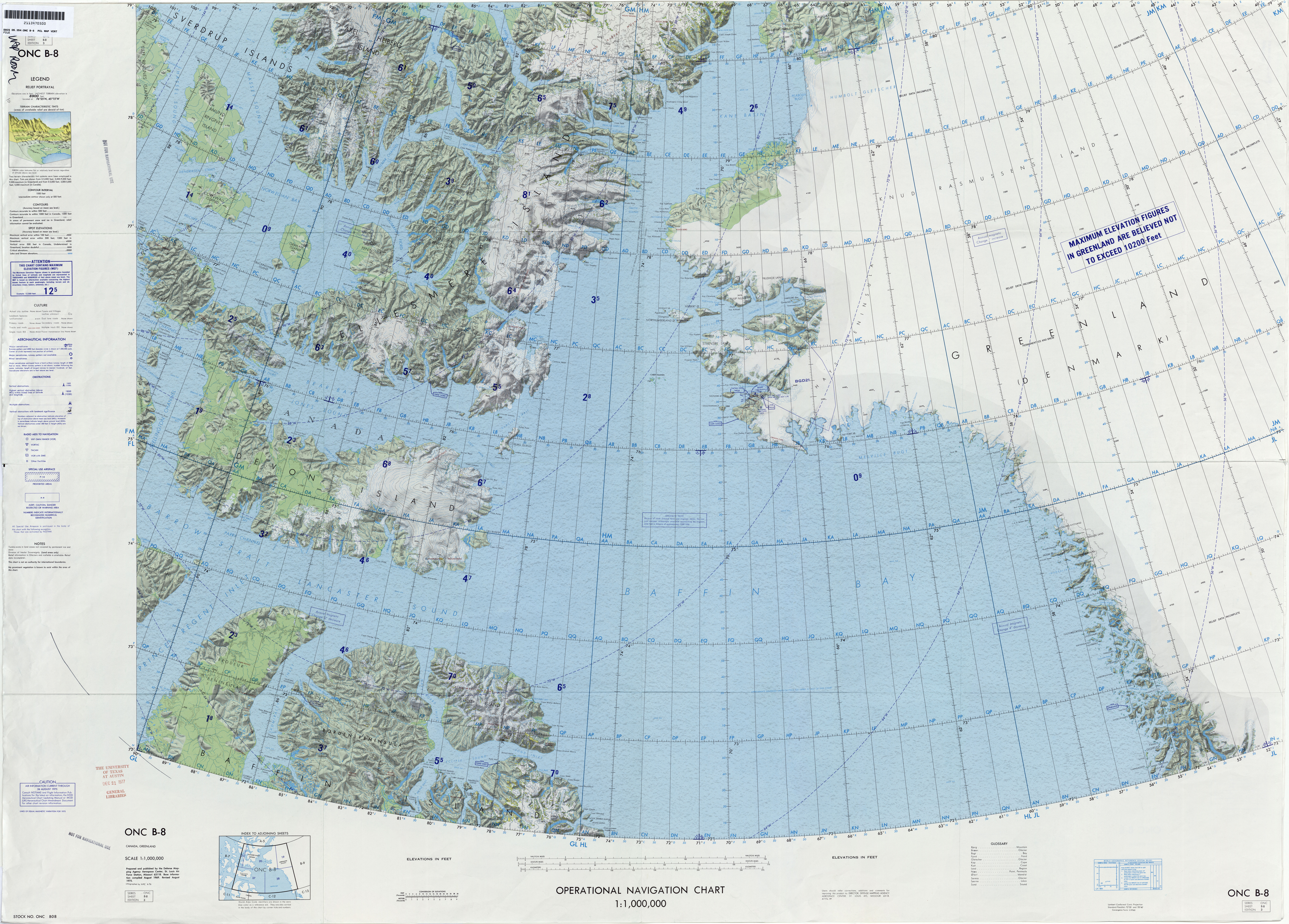
Map of Northwestern Greenland

== See also ==
- List of glaciers in Greenland
