= Periplus (book) =

Periplus: An Essay on the Early History of Charts and Sailing Directions is a seminal scholarly work by Baron Adolf Erik Nordenskiöld, published in 1897. This book represents a dedicated study of early cartography, offering a comprehensive exploration of nautical charts, sailing directions, and manuscript maps from antiquity to the mid-17th century. Nordenskiöld, a geologist, mineralogist, and Arctic explorer, brought his passion for exploration to this project, documenting and reproducing a vast array of historical maps. His work not only preserves these invaluable artifacts but also provides critical insights into the evolution of maritime navigation and cartographic techniques.

Adolf Erik Nordenskiöld’s Periplus remains a good achievement in the study of cartography. Its combination of rigorous high-quality reproductions, and insightful analysis has ensured its place as a good resource for anyone interested in the history of maps, navigation, and exploration. Nordenskiöld’s work not only preserves the legacy of early cartographers but also deepens our understanding of how humans have sought to represent and navigate their world. For scholars and enthusiasts alike, Periplus continues to be a good link to the rich and fascinating history of cartography, as for instance Andres Bianco atlas and Ptolomy's Geography.

== Background ==
Adolf Erik Nordenskiöld (1832–1901) was a member of the Finland-Swedish Nordenskiöld family, a lineage of scientists and scholars. His career was marked by interesting achievements, including his historic 1878–1880 expedition through the Northeast Passage, which made him the first to navigate the entire Northern Sea Route from Europe to Asia. Nordenskiöld’s interest with exploration and geography naturally extended to the study of historical maps, which he saw as both scientific tools and cultural artifacts.

Before Periplus, Nordenskiöld published the Facsimile-Atlas to the Early History of Cartography in 1889, this previous work reproduced and analyzed early maps with good precision. Periplus can be seen as a continuation and expansion of this effort, delving deeper into the history of nautical charts and sailing directions. Nordenskiöld’s work was part of a broader 19th-century movement to document and preserve historical knowledge, driven by advances in printing technology that allowed for high-quality reproductions of ancient manuscripts.

== Content and significance ==
Periplus is structured into several sections, each addressing a distinct aspect of early cartography. The book includes over 60 large, double-page maps and an additional 100 smaller maps embedded within the text. These maps span a wide chronological range, from ancient Greco-Roman world maps to medieval mappae-mundi (medieval European maps of the world) and including detailed portolan charts of the Renaissance.

One of the key contributions of Periplus is its focus on the practical aspects of early navigation. Nordenskiöld examines how sailors used charts and sailing directions (often referred to as periploi in antiquity) to navigate the Mediterranean, the Indian Ocean, and other maritime regions. He highlights the transition from symbolic and often speculative medieval maps to the more accurate and functional portolan charts, which emerged in the 13th century and were based on direct observation and compass bearings.

Nordenskiöld's work also sheds light on the cultural and technological exchanges that shaped cartography. For instance, he discusses the influence of Arab and Chinese navigational knowledge on European maps, as well as the role of trade routes in disseminating geographic information. His reproductions of rare and obscure maps make Periplus a valuable resource for understanding the interconnected history of exploration, commerce, and science.

The book's thoroughness has been praised for its meticulous attention to detail and his ability to contextualize maps within their historical and cultural environment set a new standard for cartographic studies. His work surpassed earlier efforts by figures like Jomard and Viscout of Santarem, who had also attempted to catalog and analyze historical maps but lacked the technological resources that Nordenskiöld could bring to the task, facts pointed out by authors like Rey Pastor.

== Reception ==
Since its publication, Periplus has been hailed as an important reference for historians, cartographers, and geographers. Its high-quality reproductions of maps, many of which were previously inaccessible, have made it a basis for cartographic studies. The book has been particularly valuable for researchers interested in the transition from medieval to modern cartography, as well as for those studying the history of navigation and exploration.

Nordenskiöld's work had a good impact on the field of historical geography. By preserving and analyzing these early maps, he helped to establish cartography as a discipline that bridges the humanities and the sciences. His emphasis on the practical uses of maps—such as their role in navigation and trade—has influenced subsequent studies of how geographic knowledge was produced and disseminated.

Periplus has opened a broader appreciation for the artistry and craftsmanship of early maps. The book’s reproductions highlight the intricate details and aesthetic beauty of medieval and Renaissance cartography, reminding readers that maps are not just scientific tools but also cultural artifacts that reflect the values, beliefs, and aspirations of their creators.

== See also ==
- Atlas
- Cartography
- Nautical Charts
- Portolan Charts

== Bibliography ==
- "Periplus: an essay on the early history of charts and sailing directions : Nordenskiöld, A. E. (Adolf Erik), 1832-1901 : Free Download, Borrow, and Streaming : Internet Archive". Internet Archive. 2016-10-23.
