= Karrat Fjord =

Fjord in Greenland

- Location in Greenland
- Location: Arctic (W Greenland)
- Coordinates: 71°23′N 53°40′W
- Ocean/sea sources: Baffin Bay
- Basin countries: Greenland

Karrat Fjord (Danish: Karrats Fjord) is a fjord in Avannaata municipality in western Greenland.

== Geography ==
Karrat Fjord has its mouth in the Nordost Bay of the Baffin Bay. The head of the fjord is formed by a number of tributaries, including the Rink Glacier, Ingia Glacier, and Umiamako Glacier fjords, as well as the Ukkusissat Fjord.

The fjord heads to the southwest, with Qeqertarsuaq Island, Illorsuit Island, and Upernivik Island near its mouth.

== History ==
The coast of Karrat Fjord has been the scene of large landslides, one of which generated a megatsunami:

- On 1 September 2009, a landslide consisting of 2,800,000 cubic metres (3,700,000 cu yd) of material occurred on the south-facing slope of the mountain Ummiammakku at 71°38′20″N 052°19′16″W. It did not reach the fjord, so no tsunami occurred.
- On 15 November 2016, another landslide occurred on the south-facing slope of Ummiammakku at 71°38′24″N 052°19′41″W. It consisted of 3,000,000 cubic metres (3,900,000 cu yd) of material, but is not known to have generated a tsunami.
- On 17 June 2017, probably because of melting ice that destabilized the rock, 35,000,000 to 58,000,000 cubic metres (46,000,000 to 76,000,000 cu yd) of rock fell from an elevation of roughly 1,000 metres (3,280 ft) on the south-facing slope of Ummiammakku at 71°32′06″N 053°12′45″W. The landslide reached the fjord, generating a megatsunami with an initial wave height of 90 to 100 m (295 to 328 ft). The wave struck the village of Nuugaatsiaq 20 km (12.4 mi) away, where the run-up was 9 metres (30 ft) and the wave swept 11 buildings into the sea and killed four people. The tsunami was noted at settlements as far as 100 kilometres (62 mi) away. An evacuation of 170 residents of Nuugaatsiaq and Illorsuit followed because of a danger of additional landslides and waves. As of March 2023, the two settlements are still abandoned due to the continuing potential for landslide-generated tsunamis in the area.

== See also ==
- List of fjords of Greenland
