= Umiamako Glacier =

Glacier in Greenland

- Umiammakku Isbræ
- Animation with the Umiamako Glacier in the foreground and the Ingia Glacier behind it

- Location within Greenland
- Location: Avannaata, Greenland
- Coordinates: 71°42′41″N 052°26′56″W
- Terminus: Karrat Fjord, Baffin Bay, North Atlantic Ocean

Umiamako Glacier (Danish: Umiammakku Isbræ), is a glacier in Avannaata, Greenland.

== Geography ==
It is a marine terminating glacier outlet of the Greenland Ice Sheet. Its terminus is in the Karrat Fjord, Nordost Bay, Baffin Bay, North Atlantic Ocean.

The Umiamako Glacier flows roughly southwestwards, bending to an almost north–south direction shortly before its terminus. It is surrounded by some of the highest mountains in west Greenland.

== See also ==
- List of glaciers in Greenland
