= Nathorst Land (Greenland) =

- Region
- Location of Nathorst Land
- Country: Greenland
- Zone: Northeast Greenland National Park

Dimensions
  - Length: 50 km (31 mi)
  - Width: 20 km (12 mi)
- Elevation: 2,399 m (7,871 ft)

Population
  - Total: 0

Nathorst Land is an area in King Christian X Land, Eastern Greenland. It lies in the Northeast Greenland National Park zone. The area is remote and uninhabited.

Nathorst Land was named after Swedish Arctic explorer Alfred Gabriel Nathorst (1850–1921) by Lauge Koch during aerial surveys in 1932 which were part of the Three-year Expedition to East Greenland.

== Geography ==
Nathorst Land is a mountainous region bounded by the F. Graae Glacier and the inner Nordvestfjord to the south, and to the north by Tærskeldal and Forsblad Fjord, beyond which lies Lyell Land. To the east it is separated from the Stauning Alps region by the Alpefjord, Prinsesse Glacier and Borgbjerg Glacier. To the west lies Charcot Land and to the northwest the Sortehest nunatak and the Greenland ice sheet.

Besides the ones bounding it, there are several glaciers in Nathorst Land, such as the Hammerskjøld Glacier, Jomfru Glacier, Violin Glacier, Toscano Glacier, Syd Glacier, Princess Glacier, Spærre Glacier, Trekant Glacier and the Sydvest Glacier, as well as the Ismarken ice cap.

Among the mountain ranges, the Häsi Mountains and the Klosterbjerge deserve mention.

Map of Northeastern Greenland

== Bibliography ==
- A. K. Higgins, Jane A. Gilotti, M. Paul Smith (eds.), The Greenland Caledonides: Evolution of the Northeast Margin of Laurentia.
