= Erik Nordenskiöld =

Swedish and Finnish entomologist (1872–1933)

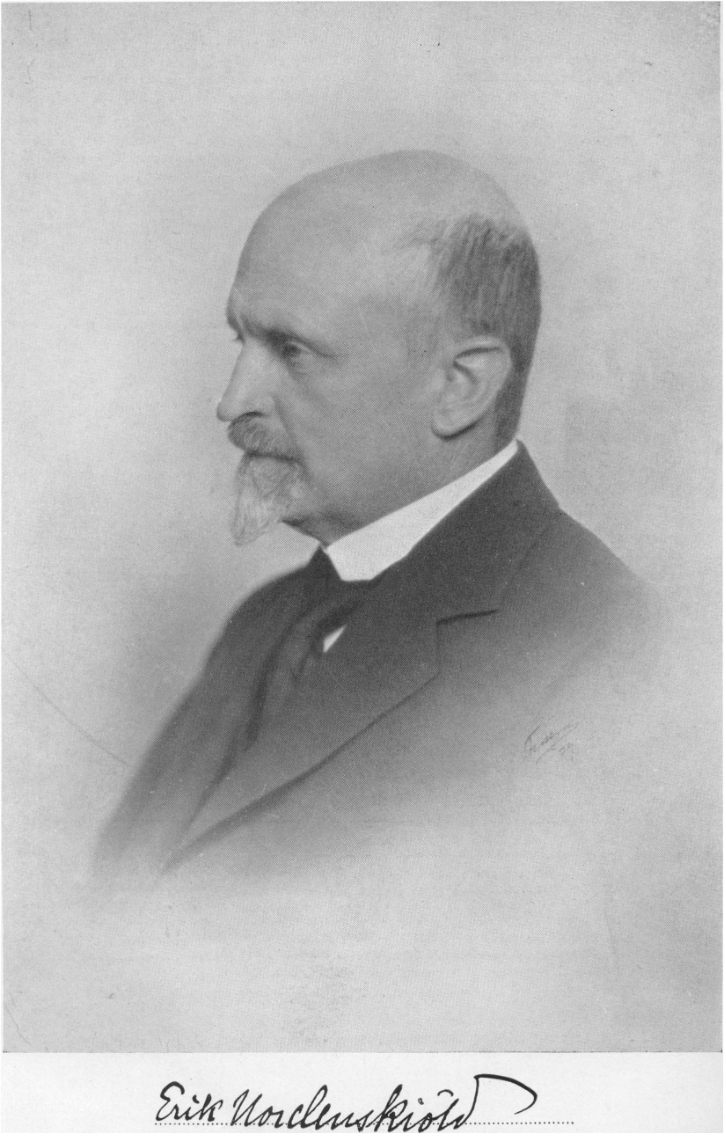
Erik Nordenskiöld

Erik Nordenskiöld (23 November 1872 – 28 April 1933) was a Finnish and Swedish aristocrat, zoologist and historian of science. He was the nephew of the explorer Adolf Erik Nordenskiöld and was best known for his work on arachnids and a pioneering work on the history of biology.

== Life and work ==
Nordenskiöld was born in the Frugård manor in Mäntsälä, Uusimaa, in a family of scholars. His grandfather had been a mineralogist and his uncle was the explorer Adolf Erik Nordenskiöld while his father was a well known agriculturist. The family library and cabinet of curiosities was considered among the richest in Finland. He studied geology and zoology at the Alexander University of Helsinki from 1890. His first work was on the origin of the earth in 1892. A member of the Societas pro Fauna et Flora Fennica, he published on the water mites of the region from 1894 to 1913. He also published a dissertation in 1898 on the morphology and evolution of the Hydrachnids. He also worked on the anatomy of the Ixodes. He travelled in 1897 to Padua to work with the arachnologist Giovanni Canestrini and in Leipzig under Rudolf Leuckart. He also worked in Stockholm with Emil Holmgren (1906) and spent some time at the research stations in Banyuls-sur-Mer and at Nancy. After receiving a doctorate in 1899 he became a lecturer at the Imperial Alexander University in Helsinki and taught on invertebrates, parasites and histology. In 1916–1917 he began a series on the history of zoology. He had married a Swede in 1906, and in 1917 he moved to Sweden, becoming a Swedish citizen in 1926. He taught at a high school in Stockholm. He published a paper on the musculature of butterflies in 1920. His most major work on the history of biology was published in three volumes from 1920 to 1924 in Swedish as Biologins Historia. This was translated into German in 1926 and an English edition was produced in 1929. George Sarton noted it as a major advance from the work of Emanuel Radl which Sarton considered as being too subjective. Sarton wrote appreciatively on the work but noted a lack of detail on the Middle Ages, chronological errors, and a lack of a historian's outlook. He died following a surgery at the age of sixty.
