= Nils Nordenskiöld =

Finnish mineralogist and traveller (1792–1866)

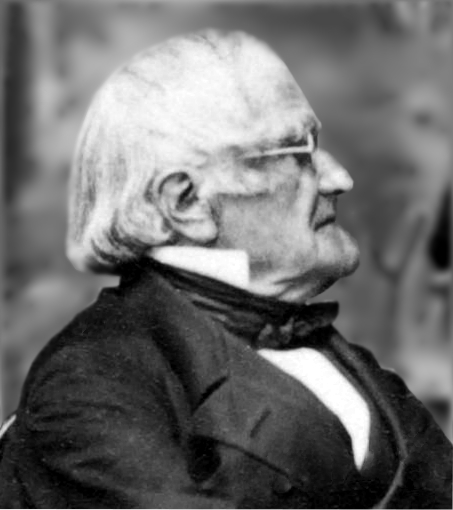
- Nordenskiöld in 1865
- Born: Nils Gustaf Nordenskiöld; 12 October 1792; Mäntsälä, Sweden (present-day Finland)
- Died: 21 February 1866 (aged 73); Mäntsälä, Grand Duchy of Finland, Russian Empire
- Known for: New minerals
- Children: Adolf Erik Nordenskiöld
- Scientific career
- Fields: Mineralogy

Signature
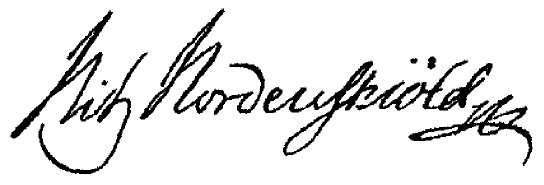

Nils Gustaf Nordenskiöld (12 October 1792 – 21 February 1866) was a Finnish mineralogist and traveller. He was the father of Adolf Erik Nordenskiöld, a mineralogist and polar explorer

== Life ==
Nordenskiöld was born on 12 October 1792, in Mäntsälä in southern Finland, which was then part of the Kingdom of Sweden. After studying mineralogy in Helsingfors, now better known as Helsinki, and in Sweden, Nordenskiöld was appointed an inspector of mines in Finland. At this point, Finland had been transferred to the Russian Empire as an autonomous grand duchy.

On 3 October 1819, Nordenskiöld was elected a corresponding member of the Russian Academy of Sciences. The Academy had been established pursuant to the order of the Peter I of Russia by the Decree of the Ruling Senate dated 28 January (8 February) 1724. In 1853, he was also elected a foreign member of the Royal Swedish Academy of Sciences.

Nordenskiöld described and discovered a number of minerals previously unknown in Finland and Russia. In 1820, Nordenskiöld published a treatise, which was renowned as the first scientific handbook on Finnish minerals. He also published a number of articles in foreign journals, which brought him to notice far beyond the Nordic countries. In future years, he was to ensure that his son, Adolf Erik Nordenskiöld, shared this knowledge and became renowned as an explorer in his own right.

Nordenskiöld returned to Finland in 1823 and in 1828 was appointed superintendent of the newly established Mining Board in Helsingfors, a post he held until his death in Mäntsälä in 1866.

== Gemstone discoveries ==
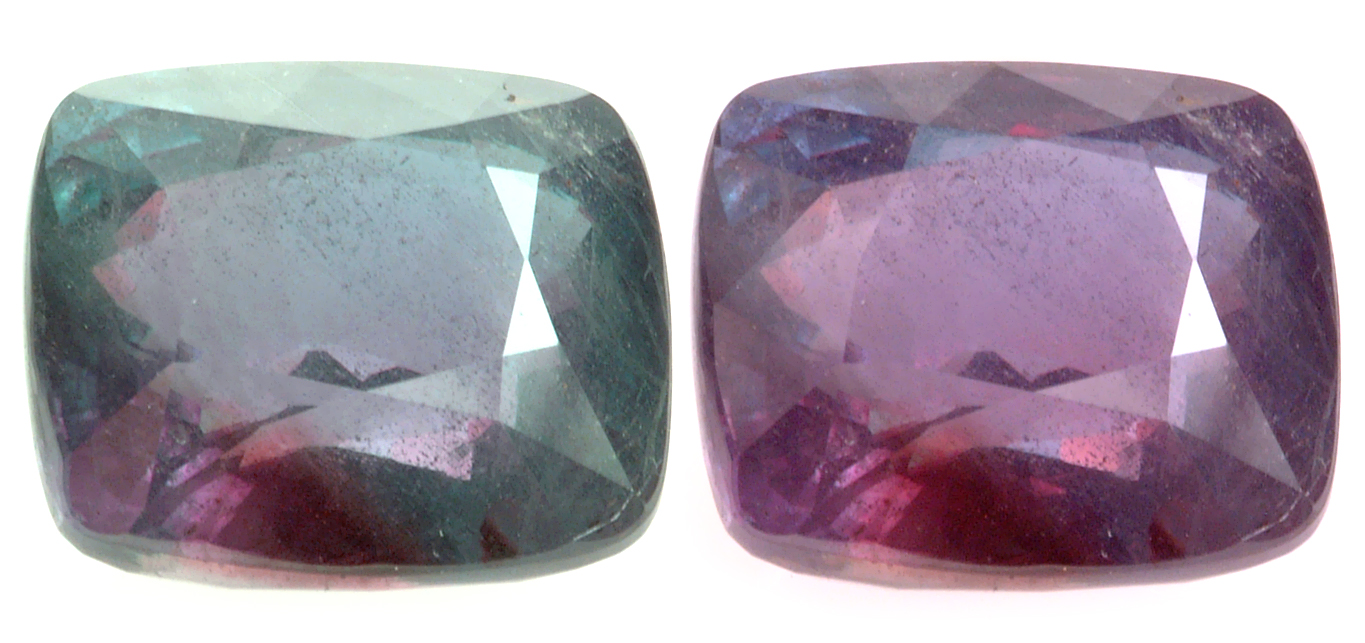
Alexandrite gemstone

According to a widely popular but controversial story, alexandrite was discovered by Nordenskiöld, on the tsarevitch Alexander's sixteenth birthday on 17 April 1834 and named alexandrite in honor of the future Tsar — Alexander II of Russia. Although it was Nordenskiöld who discovered alexandrite, he could not possibly have discovered and named it on Alexander's birthday. Nordenskiöld's initial discovery occurred as a result an examination of a newly found mineral sample he had received from Count Lev Alekseevich Perovskii (1792–1856), which he identified it as emerald at first. Confused with the high hardness, he decided to continue his examinations. Later that evening, while looking at the specimen under candlelight, he was surprised to see that the color of the stone had changed to raspberry-red instead of green. Later, he confirmed the discovery of a new variety of chrysoberyl, and suggested the name "diaphanite"(from the Greek "di" two and "aphanes", unseen or "phan", to appear, or show). Perovskii however had his own plans and used the rare specimen to ingratiate himself with the Imperial family by presenting it to the future Tsar and naming it alexandrite in his honor on 17 April 1834, but it wasn't until 1842 that the description of the color changing chrysoberyl was published for the first time under the name of alexandrite.

== Other minerals ==
Other minerals described by Nordenskiöld include :

- anorthite, under the name of amphodelite
- ainalite in 1855, a variety of cassiterite
- samarskite-(Y), under the name of adelpholite in 1855
- crookesite in 1866
- kämmererite in 1841, a variety of clinochlore
- lazur-apatite in 1857, a variety of apatite
- anorthite, under the name of lepolite

In 1849, Nordenskiöld examined what was known as "Ural's chrysolite" and discovered that it was a rich green variety of andradite garnet. In 1854, he proposed for it the name demantoid ("like a diamond").

== See also ==
- List of minerals
- List of geologists
