= Frederikshåb Glacier =

Glacier in Greenland

Coordinates: 62°37′N 49°47′W

Frederikshåb Glacier (Greenlandic: Sioqqap Sermia, Danish: Frederikshåb Isblink or Frederikshåb Gletscher) is a glacier on the southwest coast of Greenland in the Sermersooq municipality. It flows from the Greenland ice sheet and melts into various ponds and channels at its mouth that empty into Davis Strait. The nearest major town is Paamiut, roughly 110 km (68 mi) to the south, although some smaller settlements are closer; Frederikshåb is the Danish name of Paamiut.
