= Charcot Land =

Peninsula of eastern Greenland

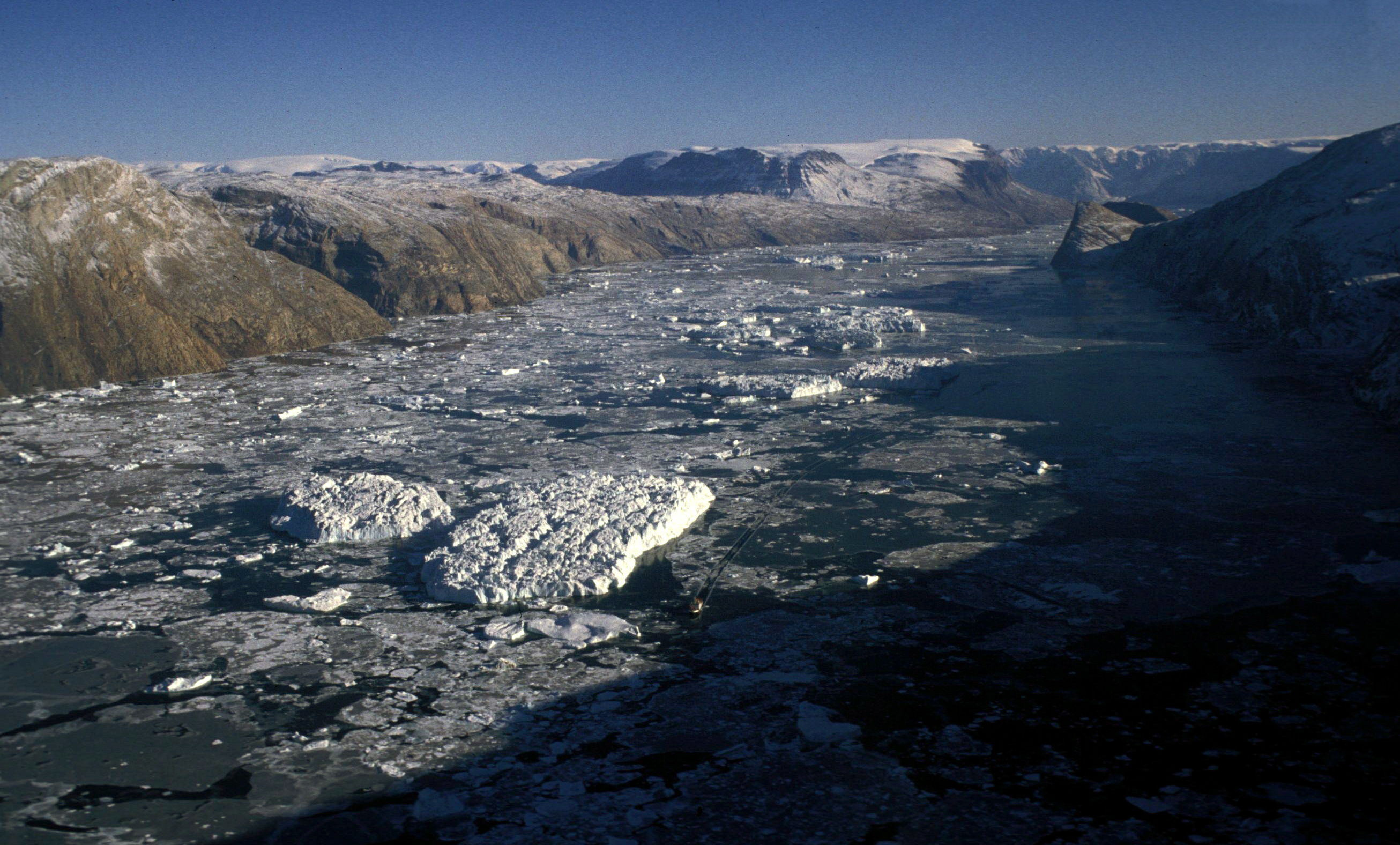
- View of the Daugaard-Jensen Glacier at the head of Nordvestfjord. The shady mountain slope on the right is part of Charcot Land.

- Location within Greenland

Geography
- Location: East Greenland
- Coordinates: 72°15′N 29°0′W
- Adjacent to: Daugaard-Jensen Glacier; Nordvestfjord; F. Graae Glacier
- Length: 35 km (21.7 mi)
- Width: 20 km (12 mi)
- Highest elevation: 1,553 m (5095 ft)

Administration
- Greenland (Denmark)
- Zone: Northeast Greenland National Park

Demographics
- Population: Uninhabited

Charcot Land is a peninsula of Eastern Greenland, part of the Scoresby Sound system. It lies in the Northeast Greenland National Park zone.

The area is remote and uninhabited. It was named after French Polar explorer Jean-Baptiste Charcot (1867–1936) during aerial surveys by Lauge Koch as part of the Three-year Expedition to East Greenland.

== Geography ==
Charcot Land is a mountainous region. It is bound to the south by the Daugaard-Jensen Glacier, beyond which lies Hinksland. To the north lies the F. Graae Glacier and to the east the head of the Nordvestfjord, its easternmost point being a headland named Kap Ursus Major.

To the west are a number of nunataks and the Greenland ice sheet.

== Bibliography ==
- A. K. Higgins, Jane A. Gilotti, M. Paul Smith (eds.), The Greenland Caledonides: Evolution of the Northeast Margin of Laurentia.
