= Erland Nordenskiöld =

Swedish archeologist and anthropologist (1877–1932)

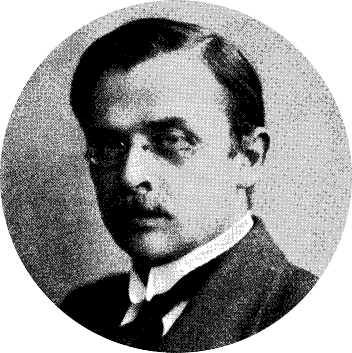
- Erland Nordenskiöld
- Born: 19 July 1877; Stockholm, Sweden
- Died: 5 July 1932 (aged 54)
- Father: Adolf Erik Nordenskiöld
- Awards: Loubat Prize
- Scientific career
- Fields: Archaeology

Erland Nordenskiöld with ashluslay (nivaclé) during the Hernmarck expedition 1908–1909.

Baron Nils Erland Herbert Nordenskiöld (19 July 1877 – 5 July 1932) was a Swedish archeologist and anthropologist. Nordenskiöld's research focused on the ethnography and prehistory of South America.

== Biography ==
He was born in Stockholm, Sweden, the son of N. A. E. Nordenskiöld, a Finnish-born aristocrat, geologist, mineralogist and Arctic explorer. He was educated at Uppsala, was connected with the Museum of Natural History at Stockholm (1906–08), and became director of the ethnographic division of the Göteborg Museum (1913). He made journeys of discovery in Patagonia (1899), in Argentina and Bolivia (1901–02), in Peru and Bolivia (1904–05), in Bolivia (1908–09), and in 1913 in the interior of South America. From these journeys he brought home large collections to Gothenburg where he was head of the Ethnographical Museum.

In 1912 he was awarded the Loubat Prize of the Royal Swedish Academy of Letters, History and Antiquities and the Wahlberg gold medal of the Swedish Society for Anthropology and Geography. He was elected a foreign member of the Royal Netherlands Academy of Arts and Sciences in 1932.

== Works ==
Besides numerous articles in scientific periodicals Nordenskiöld published:

- Från högfjäll och urskogar (1902)
- Indianlif i El Gran Chaco (Stockholm: Bonniers, 1910; German translation, Indianerleben el Gran Chaco (Süd Amerika) (Leipzig: Bonniers, 1912)
- Indianer och hvita (1911)
- Sydamerikas indianer (1912)
- ‘The Guarani Invasion of the Inca Empire in the Sixteenth Century’ in The Geographical Review, vol. 4, no. 2, August (New York: American Geographical Society, 1917)
- The Copper and Bronze Ages in South America (Göteborg: Elanders, 1921)
- Modifications in Indian Culture through Inventions and Loans (Göteborg: Elanders, 1930)
- Origin of the Indian Civilisations in South America (Göteborg: Elanders, 1931)
