= Nordenskiöld Glacier =

Glacier in Greenland

- Nordenskiöld Gletscher
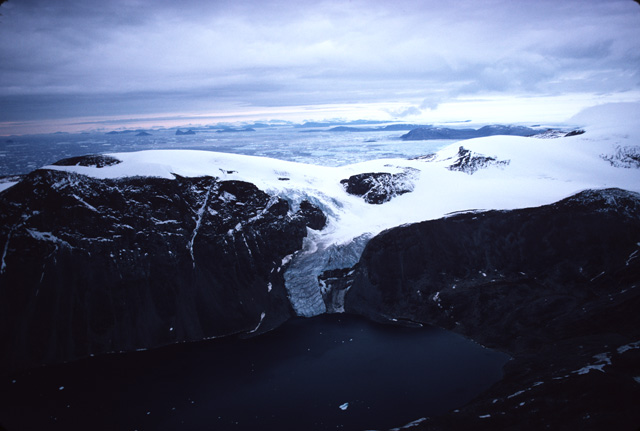
- Photograph of Nordenskiöld Glacier by the US Coast Guard

- Location within Greenland
- Type: Tidewater glacier
- Location: Greenland
- Coordinates: 75°48′N 59°0′W
- Terminus: Melville Bay

Nordenskiöld Glacier (Danish: Nordenskiöld Gletscher), is a large glacier in the Avannaata Municipality, on the northwestern coast of Greenland.

== Geography ==
This glacier is located in the Lauge Koch Coast of Melville Bay, north of the Upernavik Archipelago. It drains the Greenland ice sheet (Greenlandic: Sermersuaq) and flows southwestwards between the King Oscar Glacier to the northwest and the Sverdrup Glacier to the southeast.

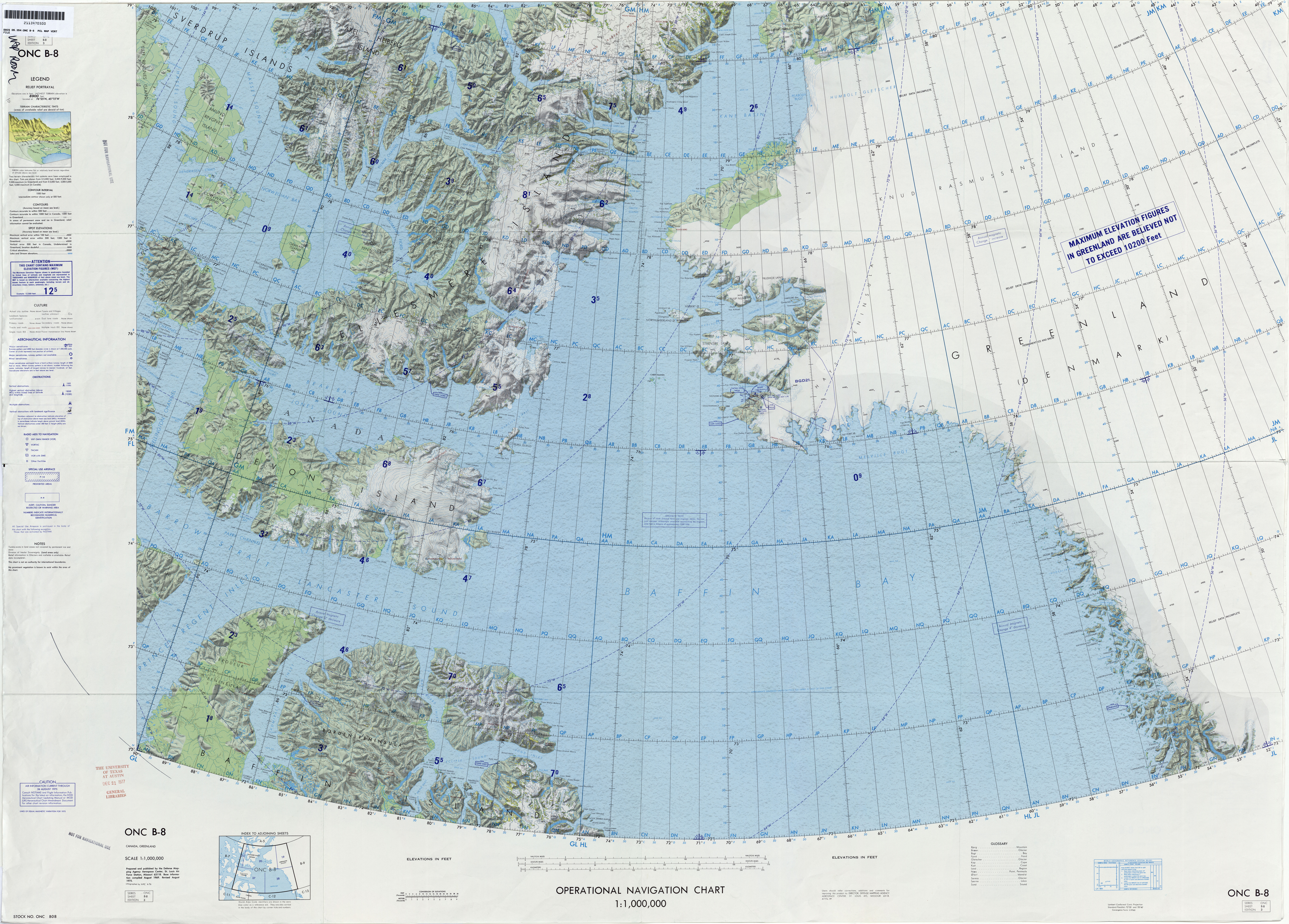
Map of Northwestern Greenland

== See also ==
- List of glaciers in Greenland
