= Nordenskiöld Glacier, West Greenland =

Glacier in Greenland

Nordenskiöld Glacier
- Nordenskiöld Gletscher
- Location within Greenland
- Location: Greenland
- Coordinates: 68°20′N 51°10′W
- Terminus: Tasiusarsuaq

Nordenskiöld Glacier (Danish: Nordenskiöld Gletscher), is a large glacier in Qeqertalik Municipality, on the Western coast of Greenland.

== Geography ==
This glacier has its terminus south of Disko Bay and north of Arfersiorfik Fjord. It drains the Greenland ice sheet westwards into the Tasiusarsuaq.

== See also ==
- List of glaciers in Greenland
