= Gaasefjord =

Fjord in Greenland

- Gåsefjord
- Nertivit Kangersivat (Greenlandic); Oqqummut Kangertiva (Greenlandic)
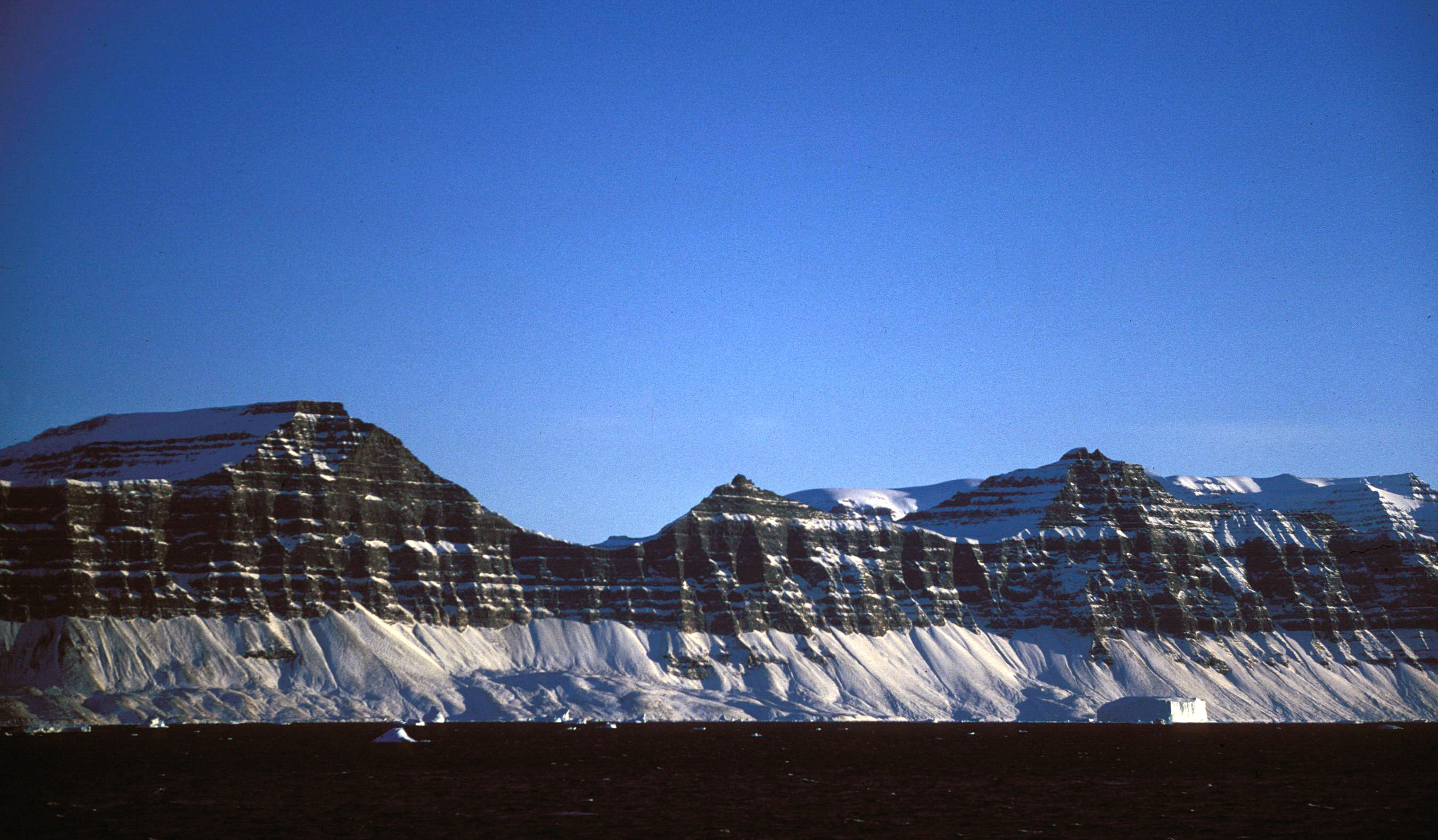
- The southern shore of Gaasefjord is lined by basalt cliffs that continue eastward.

- Location in Greenland
- Location: Arctic
- Coordinates: 70°10′N 27°15′W
- Ocean/sea sources: Scoresby Sound; Greenland Sea
- Basin countries: Greenland
- Max. length: 70 km (43 mi)
- Max. width: 15 km (9.3 mi)

Gaasefjord (Greenlandic: Nertivit Kangersivat; Danish: Gåsefjord, meaning 'Goose Fjord') is a fjord in King Christian X Land, eastern Greenland. This fjord is part of the Scoresby Sound system. Administratively it lies in the area of Sermersooq municipality.

== History ==
The Gåsefjord was named in 1891 by Carl Ryder during his 1891–92 East Greenland Expedition. It was named after the geese, for the Barnacle goose and the Pink-footed goose are common in the region. Other names given by former surveyors were Sydfjorden, by Ragnvald Knudsen, and Taagefjord by Nikolaj Hartz.

The Greenlandic name Nertivit Kangersivat is being used in present-day maps, although originally the fjord was known as Oqqummut Kangertiva.

== Geography ==
In the southern Scoresby Sound, between Cape Leslie in Milne Land to the north and Cape Stevenson to the south, there are the mouths of two fjords that go in a roughly southwestern direction. The northern branch is the Fonfjord (Fønfjord) and the southern is the much wider mouth of the Gaasefjord. Gåseland is the peninsula that lies between these two fjords.

To the north the fjord is bound by Gaaseland and to the south by the Geikie Plateau. The southern shore of Gaasefjord is lined by basalt cliffs that continue eastward. The following glaciers have their terminus in the shores of the fjord: (from east to west) Syd Glacier at the mouth, Magga Dang Glacier, Kista Dang Glacier and the Gåse Glacier.

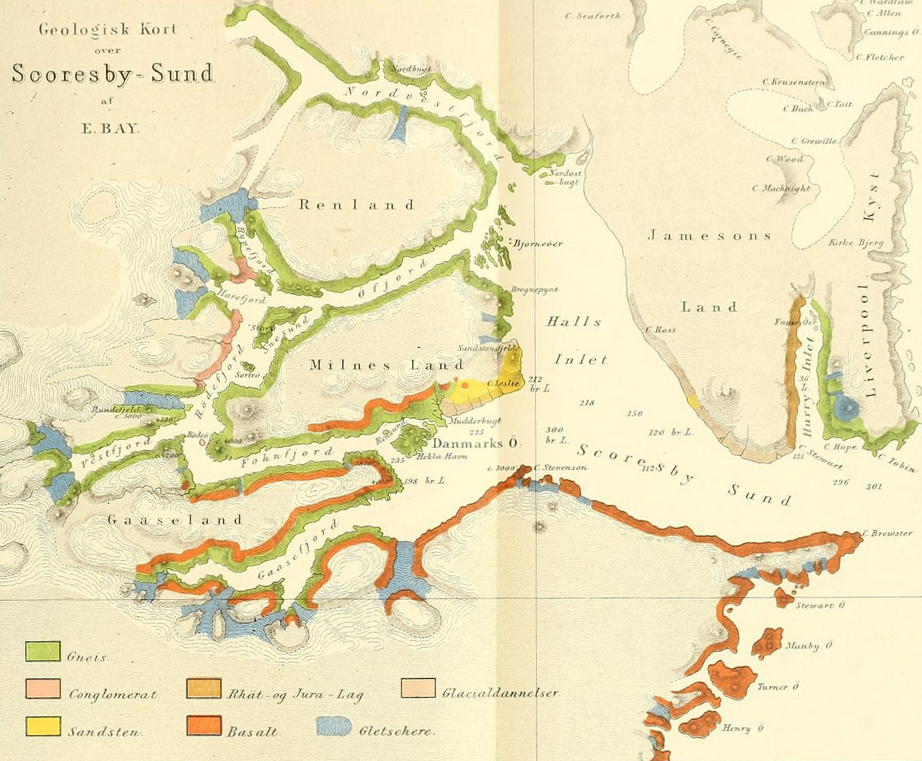
Geological map of Scoresby Sound.

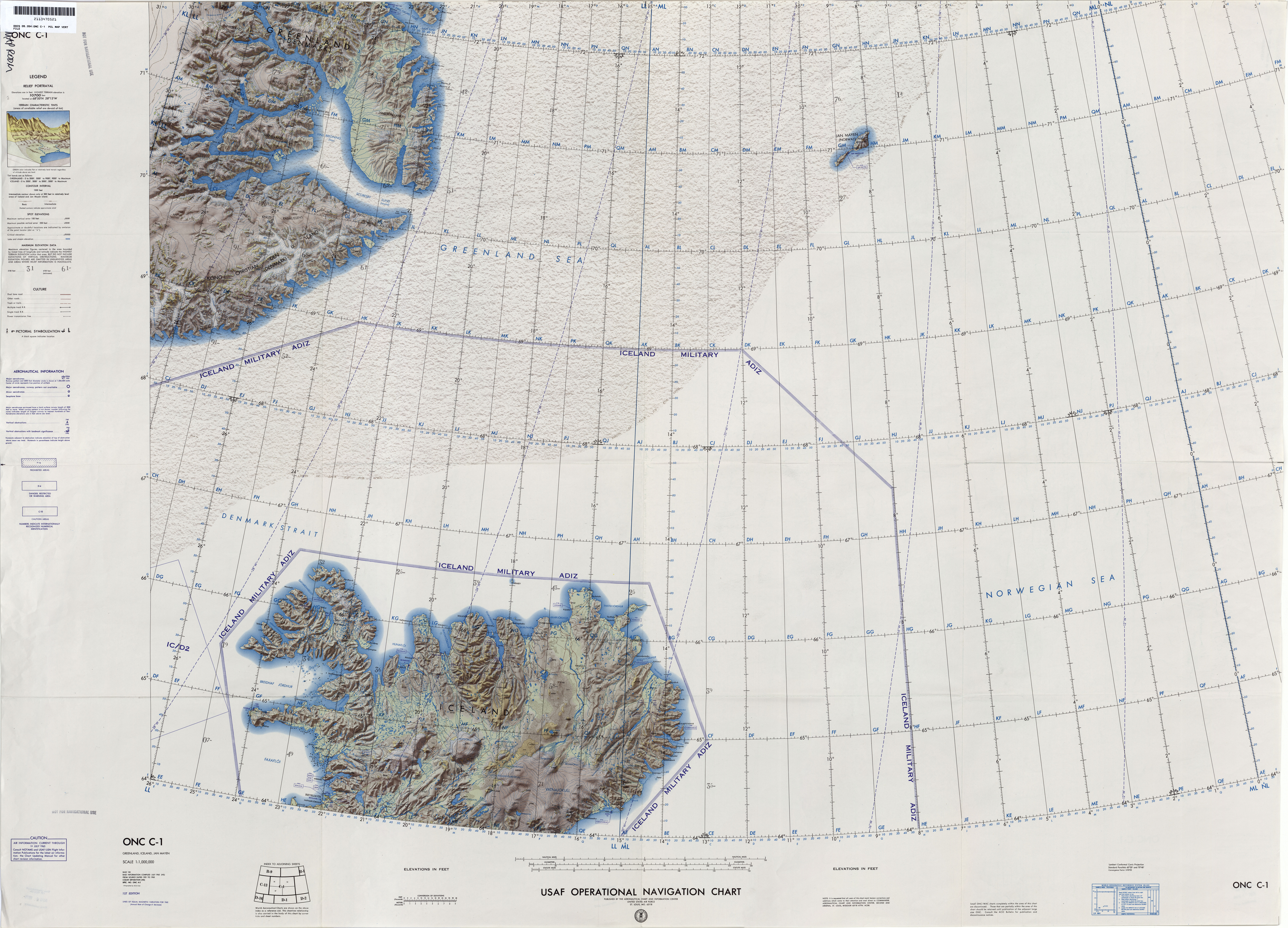
Map of NE Greenland and Iceland.

== See also ==
- List of fjords of Greenland
