= Danmark Island =

Island in Sermersooq, Greenland

Ujuaakajiip Nunaa Danmark Ø
- Location within Greenland

Geography
- Location: Scoresby Sound; Greenland Sea
- Coordinates: 70°31′N 26°15′W
- Area: 81 km^{2} (31 sq mi)
- Length: 13.3 km (8.26 mi)
- Width: 12.4 km (7.71 mi)
- Highest elevation: 380 m (1250 ft)

Administration
- Greenland
- Municipality: Sermersooq

Demographics
- Population: 0

Danmark Island (Greenlandic: Ujuaakajiip Nunaa; Danish: Danmark Ø) is an island in Scoresby Sund. Administratively it lies in the area of Sermersooq municipality.

== History ==
The island was named in 1891 by Carl Ryder during his 1891–92 East Greenland Expedition. It was chosen as a wintering harbor in 1891/2 during the exploration of the Scoresby Sund fjord system.

Numerous remains of Inuit habitations were found on the island by the East Greenland Expedition, indicating that the Scoresby Sound area had been inhabited in relatively recent times.

The Greenlandic name Ujuaakajiip Nunaa was registered in 1955 by the Danish Geodætisk Institut. It means "Little Johan’s Land" after Johan Petersen, Scoresbysund colony manager, who was known to the locals as "Ujuât".

== Geography ==
Danmark Island lies at the eastern end of Fon Fjord by its mouth. Ten kilometers before the mouth, the fjord has a branch in the northeastern shore named Rensund that separates Danmark Island from Milne Land to the north.

Located in the southeastern shore, Hekla Havn is the natural harbor used as a base for expedition ship Hekla in 1891–92.

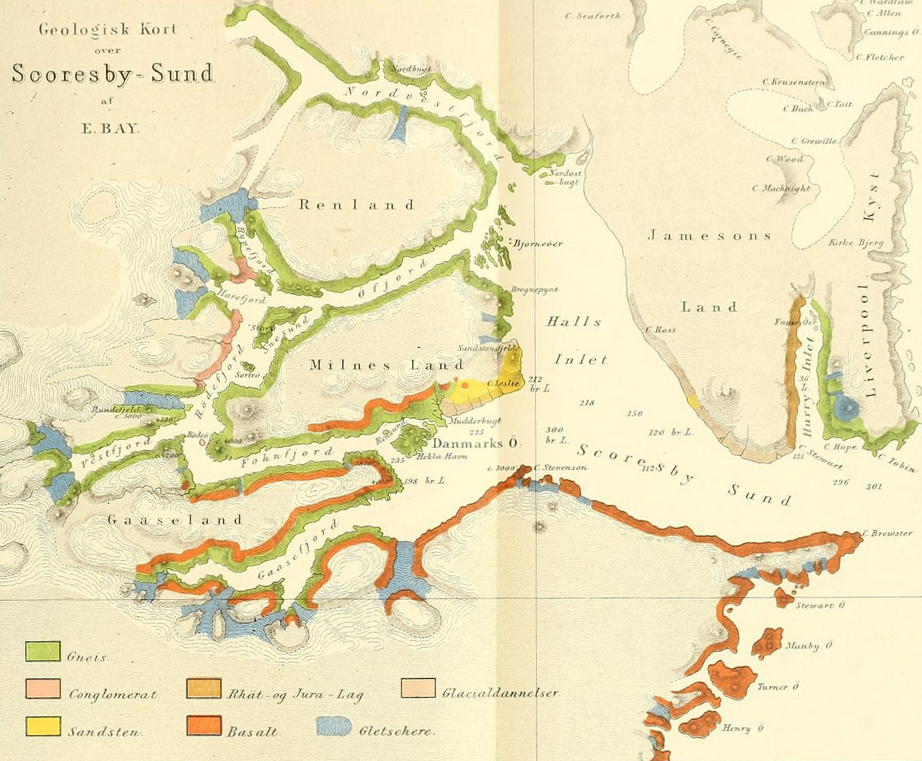
Geological map of Scoresby Sound.

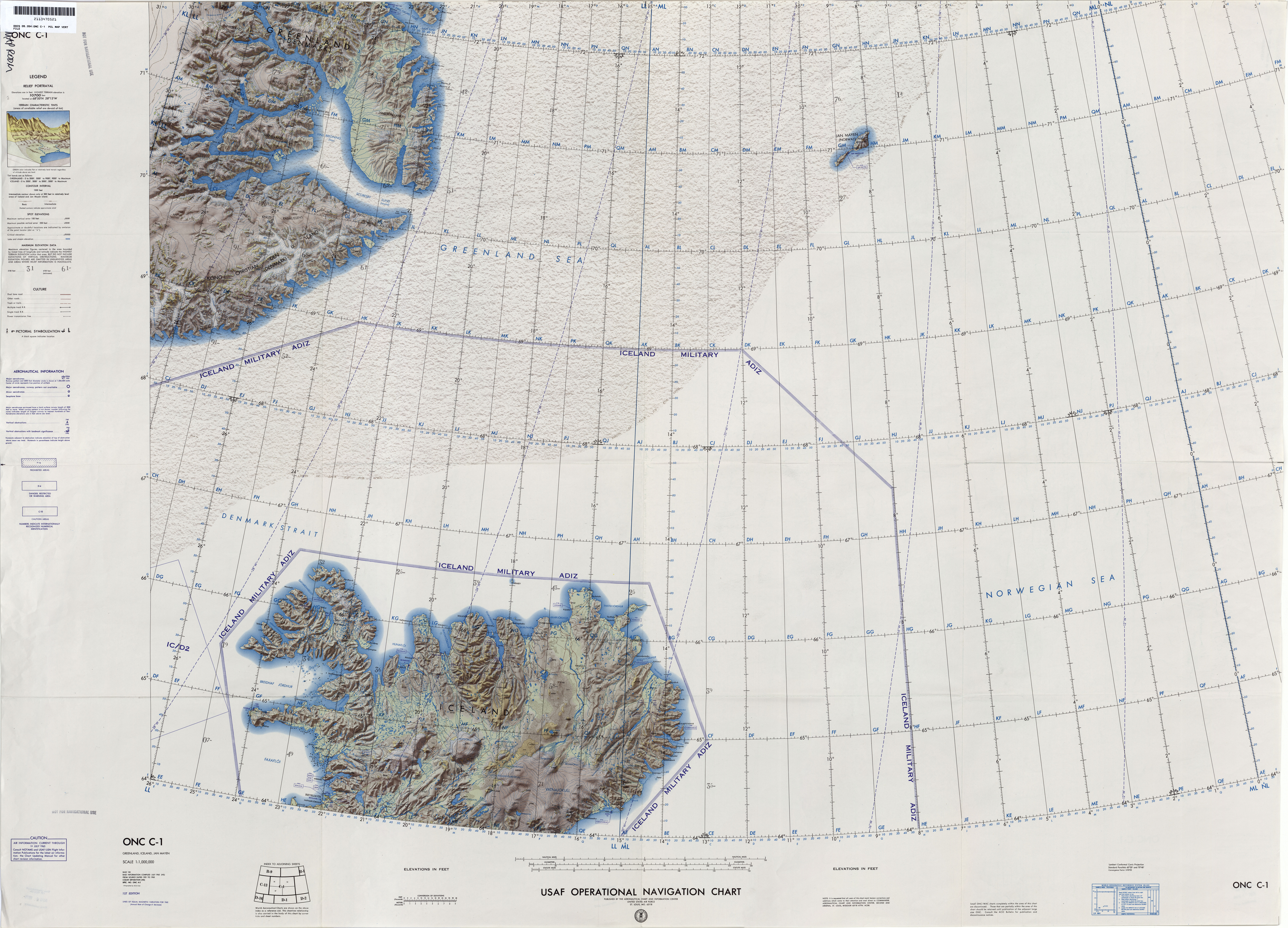
Map of NE Greenland and Iceland.

== See also ==
- List of islands of Greenland
