= Fonfjord =

Fjord in Greenland

- Fønfjord
- Ujuaakajiip Kangertiva (Greenlandic)
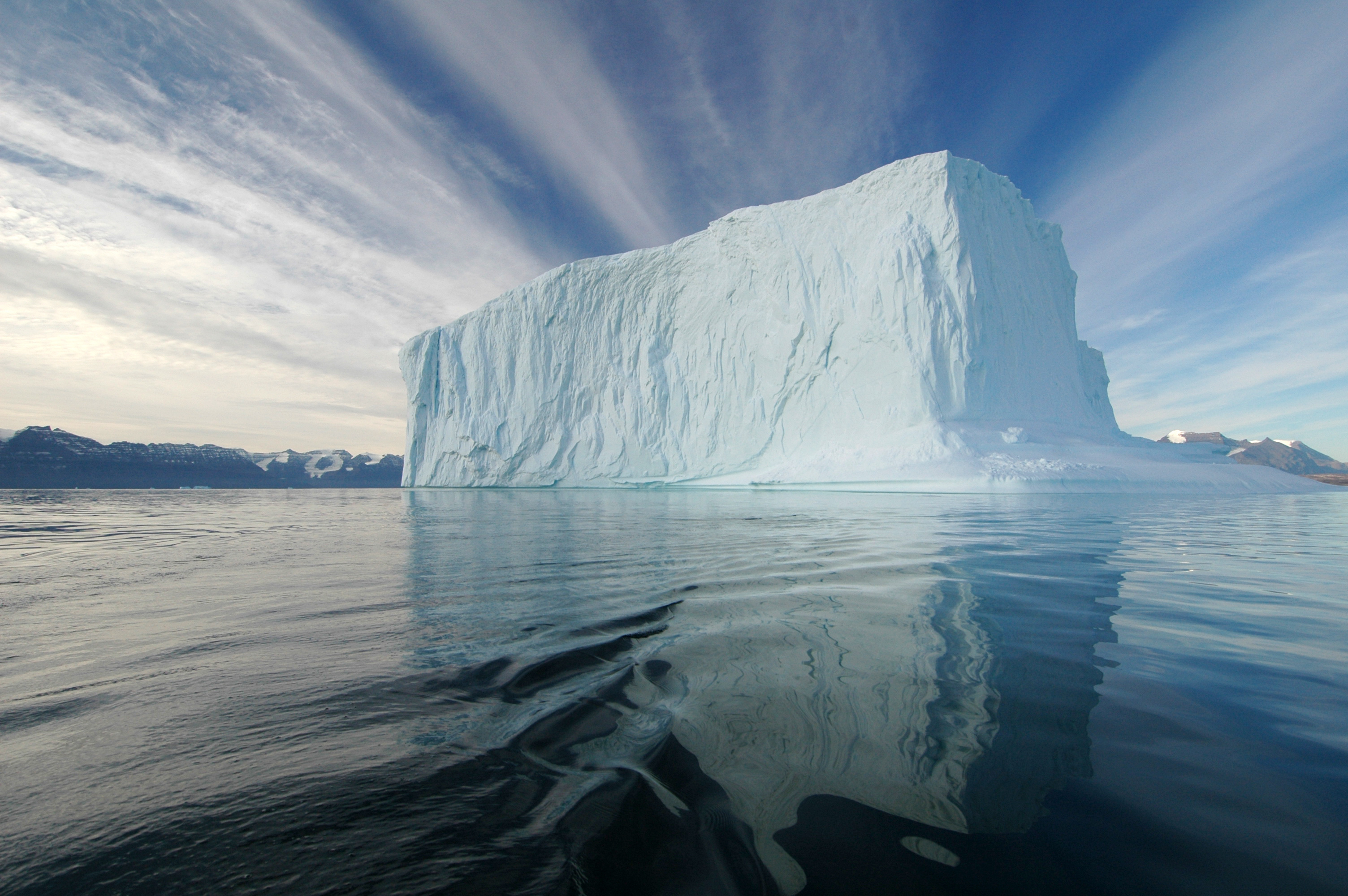
- Iceberg in Fonfjord.

- Location in Greenland
- Location: Arctic
- Coordinates: 70°28′N 27°0′W
- Ocean/sea sources: Scoresby Sound; Greenland Sea
- Basin countries: Greenland
- Max. length: 80 km (50 mi)
- Max. width: 6 km (3.7 mi)

Fonfjord (Greenlandic: Ujuaakajiip Kangertiva; Danish: Fønfjord, meaning 'Foehn Fjord') is a fjord in King Christian X Land, eastern Greenland. This fjord is part of the Scoresby Sound system. Administratively it lies in the area of Sermersooq municipality.

== History ==
This long fjord was surveyed and named in 1891 by Carl Ryder during his 1891–92 East Greenland Expedition. It was named "Føhnfjord" owing to the powerful Foehn wind gusts blowing during the first exploration of the fjord in August 1891. Ryder wrote:

... Icebergs now came sailing out of the fjord in a strong current, and with very frequent calving perhaps because of the warm temperature.

Another name given by former surveyors was Blastfjord, by Hans Christian Gulløv.

== Geography ==
In the southern Scoresby Sound, between Cape Leslie in Milne Land to the north and Cape Stevenson to the south, there are the mouths of two fjords that go in a roughly southwestern direction. The northern branch is the Fonfjord and the southern is the much wider mouth of the Gaasefjord (Gåsefjord). Gaaseland (Gåseland) is the peninsula that lies between these two fjords.

To the north the fjord is bound by Milne Land and to the south by Gaaseland. Danmark Island lies at the eastern end, by its mouth. Ten kilometers before the mouth, the fjord has a branch in the northeastern shore named Rensund that separates Danmark Island from Milne Land. Fonfjord makes a sharp bend to the north near the western end with the Rode Fjord (Rødefjord) running in a north-northeasterly direction and the Vestfjord branching roughly to the southwest.

The Rolige Bræ glacier flows into the Rode Fjord just north of the Vestfjord junction.

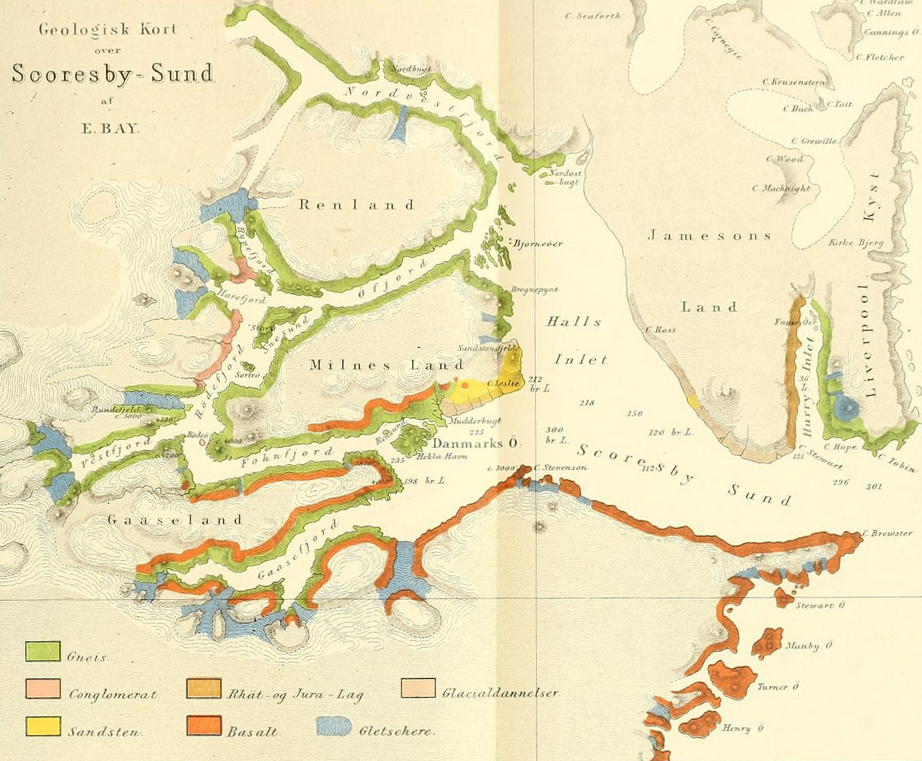
Geological map of Scoresby Sound.

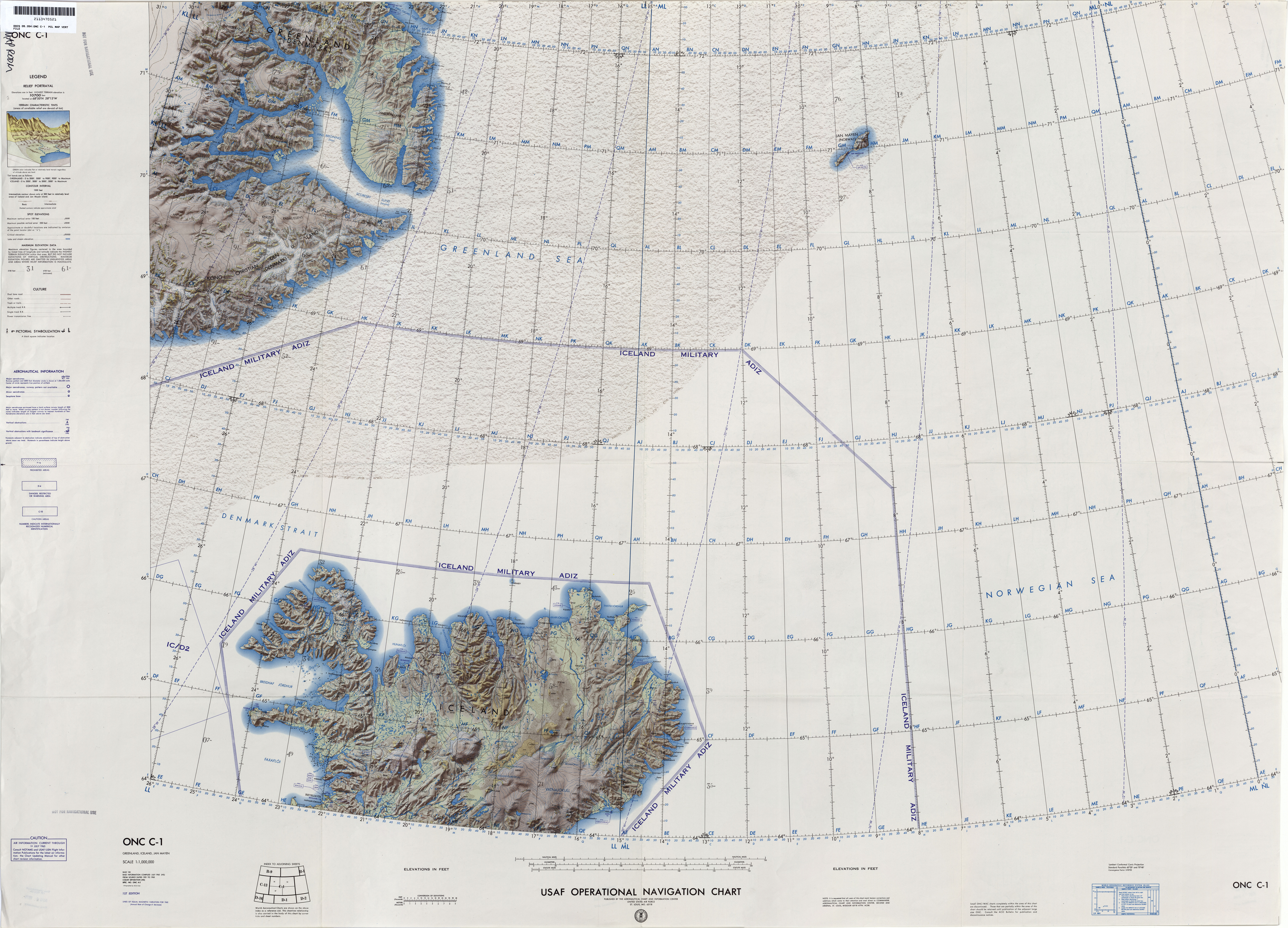
Map of NE Greenland and Iceland.

== See also ==
- List of fjords of Greenland
