= Ofjord =

Fjord in eastern Greenland

Øfjord
- Ikaasakajik (Greenlandic)
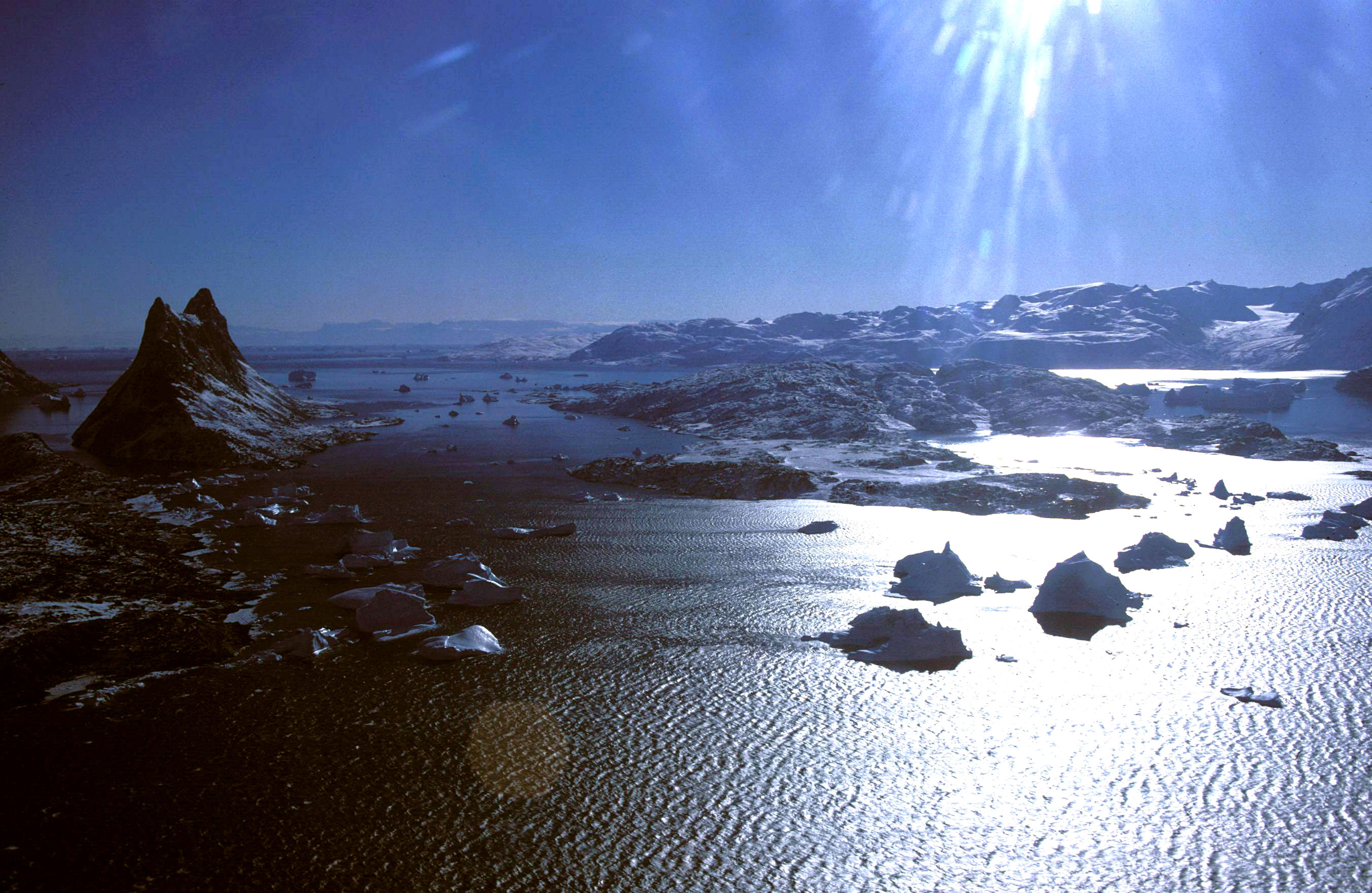
- View of the Bjorne Islands on the left and the mouth of Øfjord on the right.

- Location in Greenland
- Location: Arctic
- Coordinates: 71°0′N 26°15′W
- Ocean/sea sources: Scoresby Sound; Greenland Sea
- Basin countries: Greenland
- Max. length: 95 km (59 mi)
- Max. width: 4.5 km (2.8 mi)

Ofjord (Greenlandic: Ikaasakajik; Danish: Øfjord, meaning 'Island Fjord') is a fjord in King Christian X Land, eastern Greenland. This fjord is part of the Scoresby Sound system. Administratively it lies in the area of Sermersooq municipality.

== History ==
The Øfjord was named in 1891 by Carl Ryder during his 1891–92 East Greenland Expedition owing to the islands on the southern side of its mouth.

The Greenlandic name Ikaasakajik ("the bad sound") originated in a 1955 name registration by the Geodetical Institute of Denmark (Geodætisk Institut). The name makes reference to the persistent katabatic winds blowing along the fjord.

== Geography ==
The 4 km (2.5 mi) to 5 km (3.1 mi) wide Ofjord is a sound with a fjord structure located in the northern Hall Gulf (Hall Bredning), part of the inner Scoresby Sound.

From its mouth near the Bjorne Islands this fjord runs in a roughly NE/SW direction for about 60 km (37 mi) until it bends and runs in a slightly more east–west direction for a further 35 km (22 mi). About 10 km (6.2 mi) before the confluence there is a sound branching on its southern shore towards the southwest, the Snesund. Further west the Rype Fjord branches to the northwest, the Hare Fjord continues in a westerly direction and the Rode Fjord (Røde Fjord) branches towards the south.

To the northeast the fjord is bound by Renland, a peninsula attached to the mainland, and to the south by the island of Milne Land. The island of Storo lies on the NW side of the Snesund.

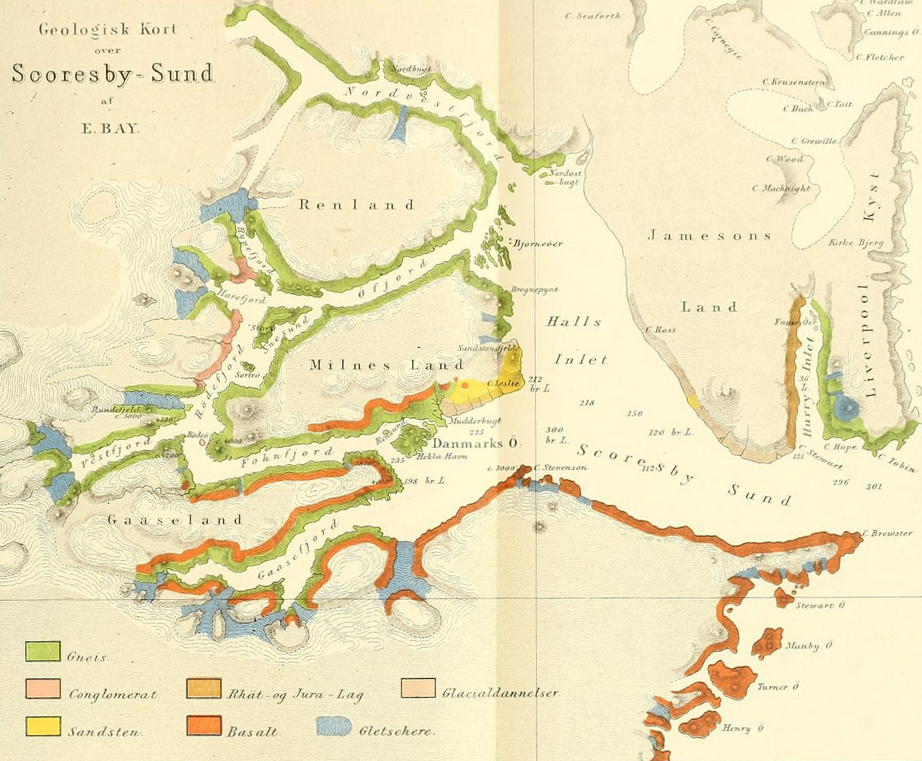
Geological map of Scoresby Sound.

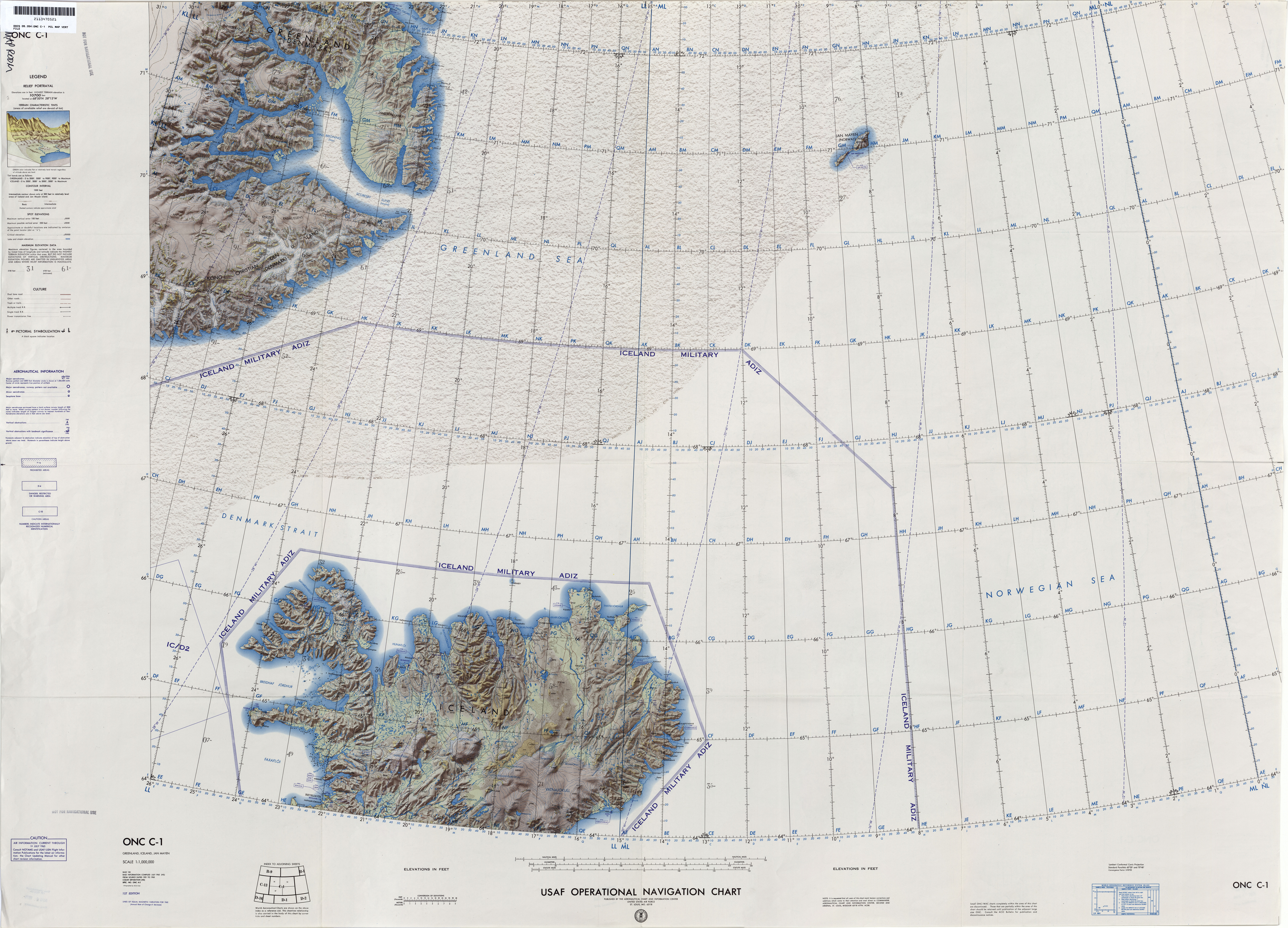
Map of NE Greenland and Iceland.

== See also ==
- List of fjords of Greenland
