= Vestfjord =

Fjord in Greenland

- Location in Greenland
- Location: Arctic
- Coordinates: 70°30′N 28°45′W
- Ocean/sea sources: Scoresby Sound; Greenland Sea
- Basin countries: Greenland
- Max. length: 50 km (31 mi)
- Max. width: 6.4 km (4.0 mi)

Vestfjord, meaning "West Fjord" in the Danish language, is a fjord in King Christian X Land, eastern Greenland. This fjord is part of the Scoresby Sound system in the area of Sermersooq municipality.

== Geography ==
This tributary fjord extends between high mountains for about 50 km (31 mi) in a west–east direction until its mouth in the confluence of the Rode Fjord (Røde Fjord) and the Fonfjord (Fønfjord) opposite the western end of Milne Land.

Two large glacier branches have their terminus in the Vestfjord, the Døde Bræ from the northwest and the Vestfjord Glacier from the southwest —the latter aligned with the fjord. They flow into the head of the Vestfjord at the fjord's western end and a nunatak reaching a height of 2,468 m (8,097 ft) rises between the two glaciers.

Geologically this fjord is part of the Vestfjord-Hinksland gneiss and schist zone crystalline complex.

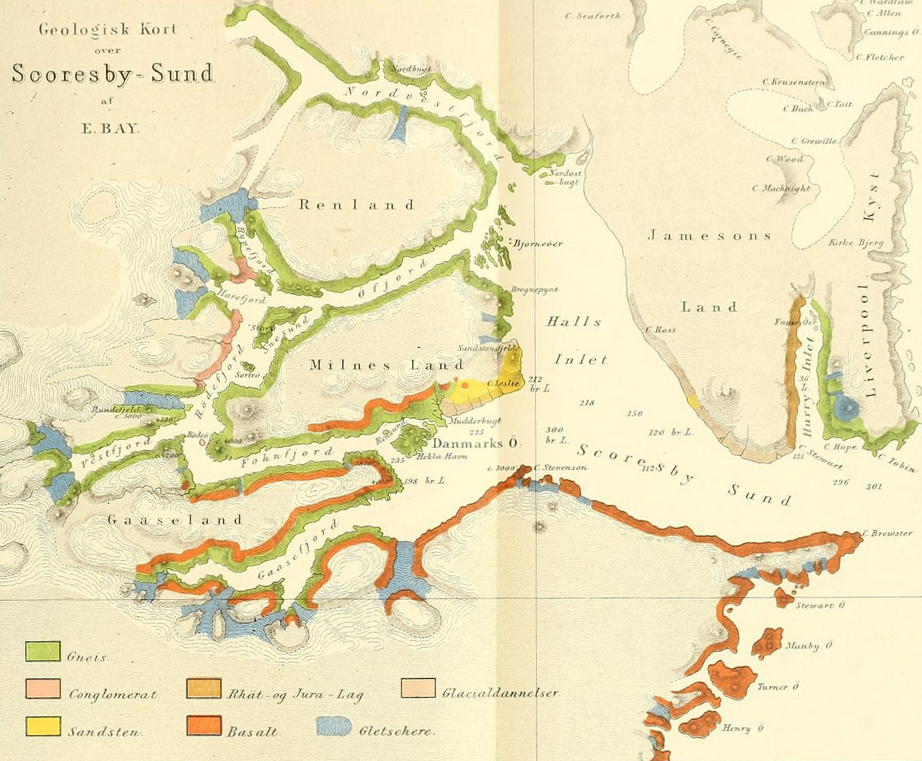
Geological map of Scoresby Sound.

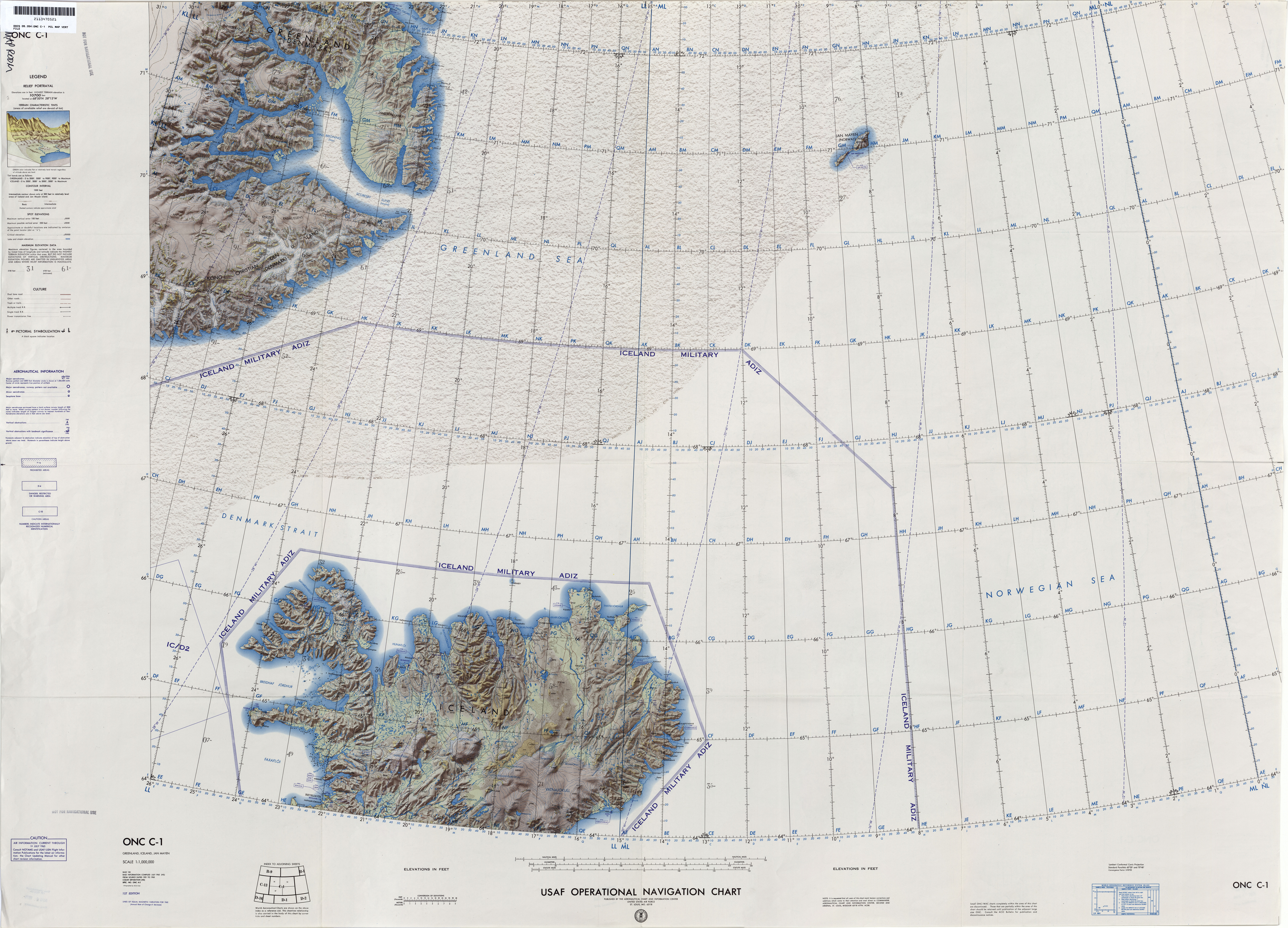
Map of NE Greenland and Iceland.

== See also ==
- List of fjords of Greenland
