= Storo (Greenland) =

Island in Sermersooq, Greenland

Storø
- Location within Greenland

Geography
- Location: Scoresby Sound; Greenland Sea
- Coordinates: 70°48′57″N 27°30′28″W
- Area: 192 km^{2} (74 sq mi)
- Coastline: 63.3 km (39.33 mi)
- Highest elevation: 1,770 m (5810 ft)

Administration
- Greenland
- Municipality: Sermersooq

Demographics
- Population: 0

Storo (Danish: Storø, meaning 'Big island') is an uninhabited island in the Scoresby Sound fjord, Sermersooq Municipality, eastern Greenland.

== Geography ==
Roughly triangular in shape, Storo lies to the SW of Renland and is separated by the Snesund from the NW shore of Milneland. The small Sorte Island lies off its southern point. The island lies between the Ofjord to the north and the Rode Fjord to the west; the mouths of the Hare Fjord and the Rype Fjord are off its northwestern end. The island has an area of 192 km^{2} and a shoreline of 63.3 kilometres. Storo has an ultra prominent mountain of 1,770 metres (5,810 ft) in height.

Currently, the Canadian public company Greenland Resources Inc holds the mineral rights for Storø and is conducting advance exploration programs to evaluate the economic feasibility of building a gold mine.

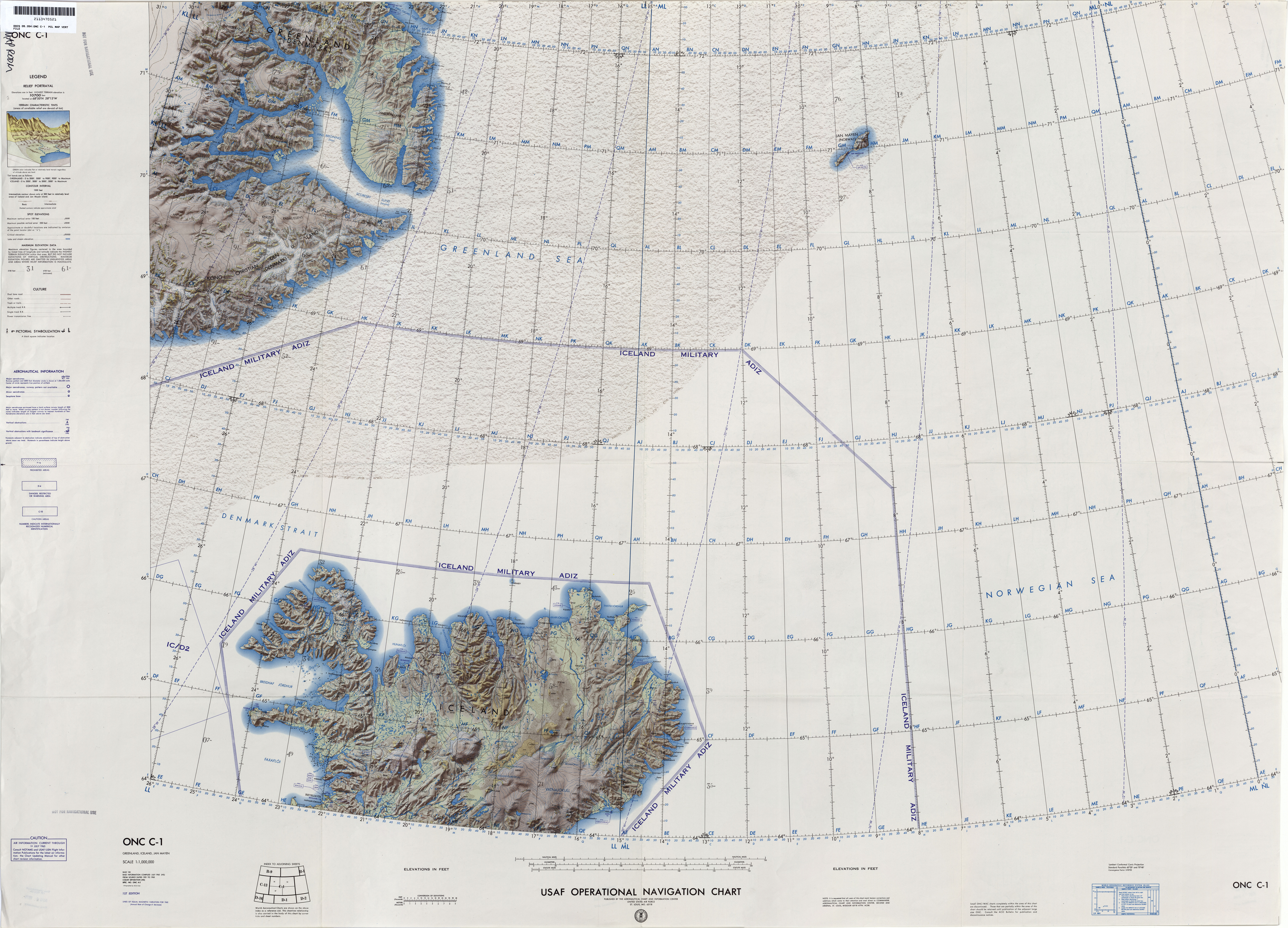
Map of NE Greenland and Iceland.

== See also ==
- List of islands of Greenland
