= Renland =

Peninsula in Greenland

Tuttut Nunaat
- Location within Greenland

Geography
- Location: East Greenland
- Coordinates: 71°14′N 26°45′W
- Adjacent to: Nordvestfjord; Øfjord
- Length: 88 km (54.7 mi)
- Width: 62 km (38.5 mi)
- Highest elevation: 2,340 m (7680 ft)

Administration
- Greenland (Denmark)
- Municipality: Sermersooq

Renland is a peninsula in eastern Greenland. It is a part of the Sermersooq municipality. Despite its proximity to the coast Renland has an ice cap climate with bitterly cold winters and very low maximum temperatures in the summer.

Renland was named after the reindeer which were found formerly in the area, but disappeared around the early 20th century.

== Geography ==
Renland is surrounded to the north by the Nordvestfjord of the Scoresby Sound, to the south by the 6 to 10 km wide Ofjord and to the southwest by the Rype Fjord. To the west the peninsula is attached to the mainland and to the northwest lies Th. Sørensen Land and beyond it the Hinksland peninsula. Nathorst Land lies to the north, across the Nordvestfjord

The Bjorne Islands lie off its eastern shore and to the south across the Ofjord lie the islands of Milneland and Storo. Renland has its own ice cap on a high plateau in the middle of the peninsula and in the southern part there are glacial lakes separated by glacial tongues.

This wide and desolate place is a popular destination for mountain climbing owing to its steep slopes, massive rocky crags and jagged peaks. Constable Point (Nerlerit Inaat) is the closest airport.

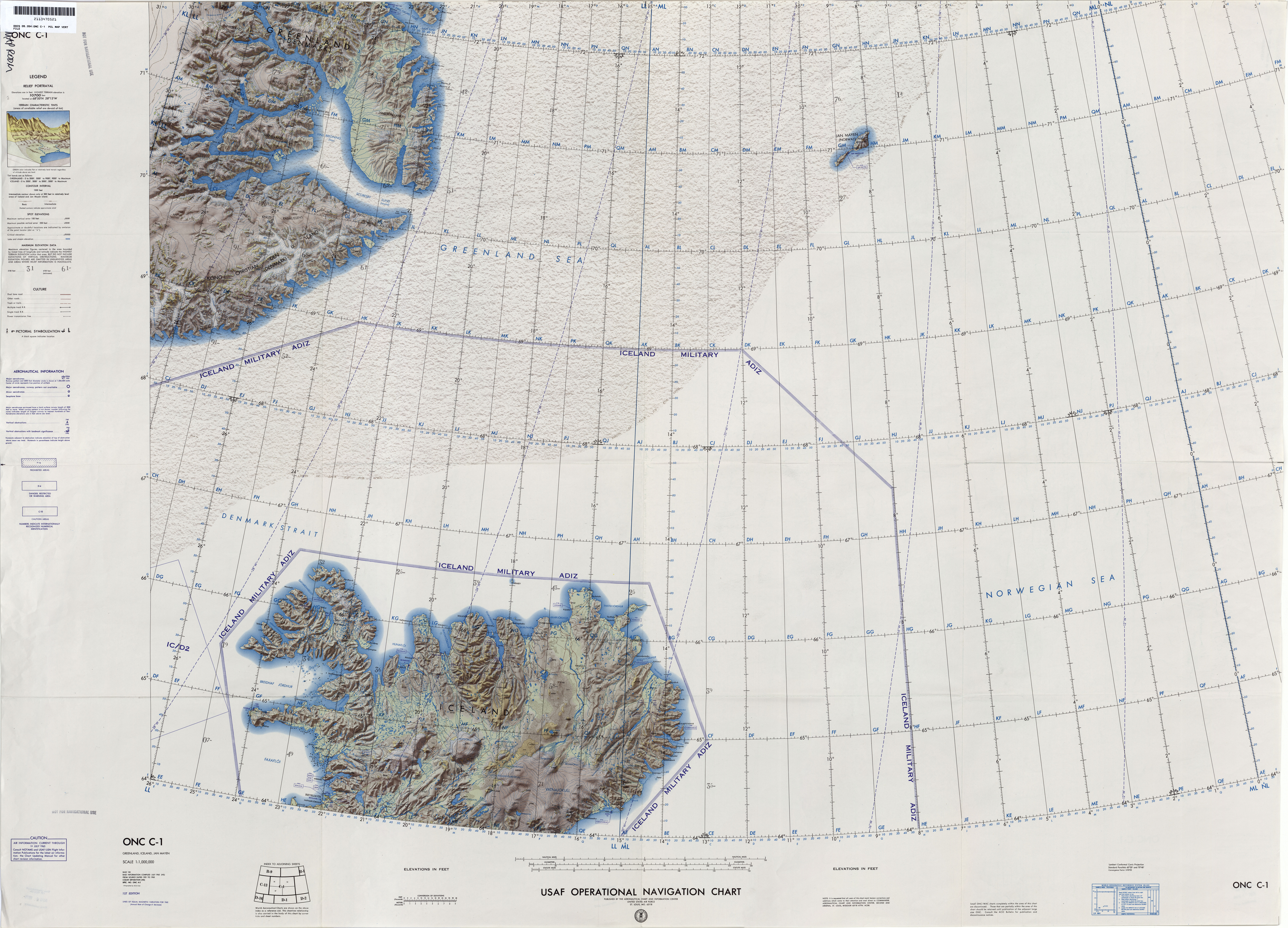
Map of NE Greenland and Iceland.

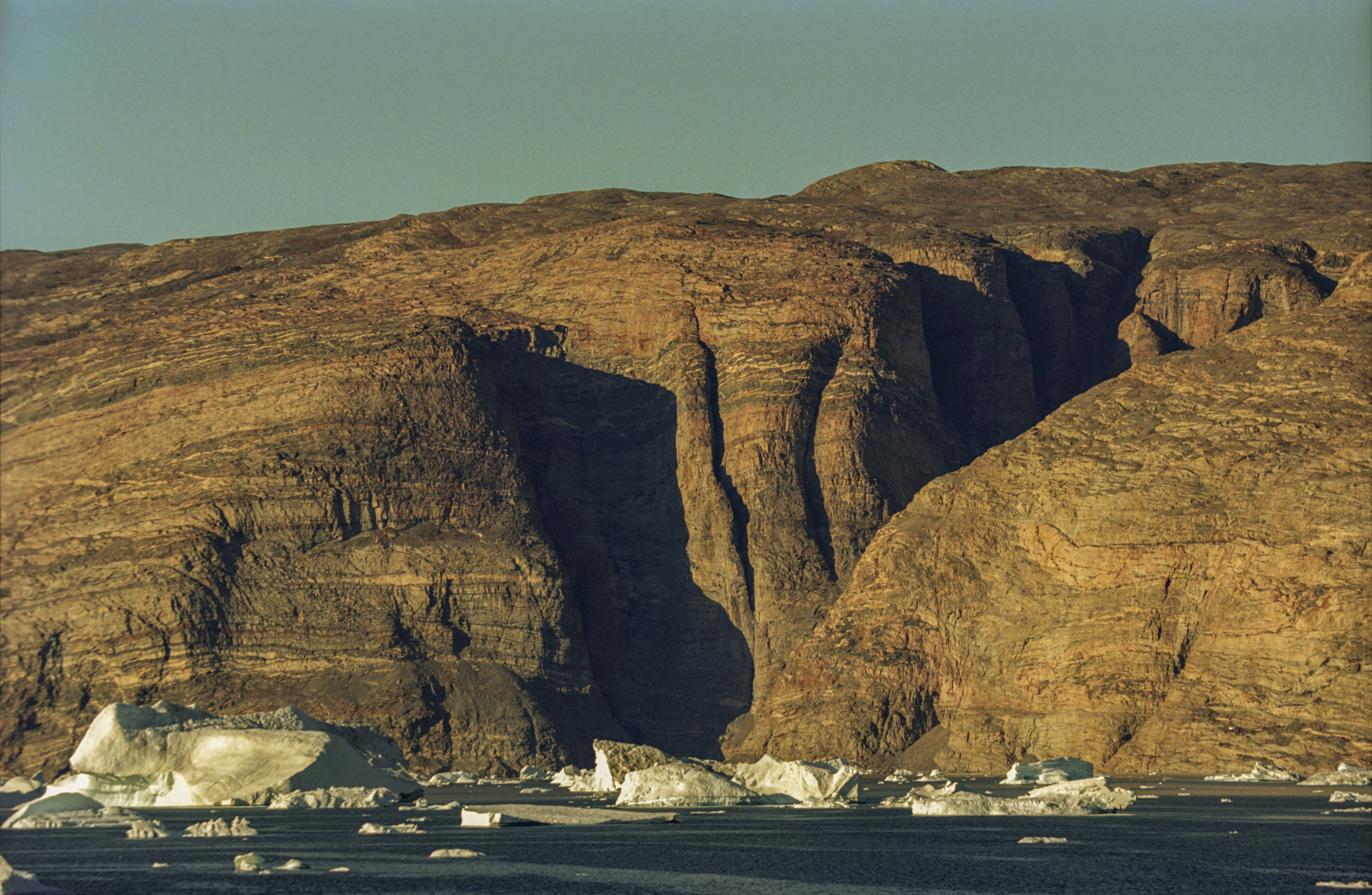
Cliffs and ice floes at the Nordvestfjord.

== See also ==
- Liverpool Land
- Milne Land
- Scoresby Land

== Bibliography ==
- Archaeology and Environment in the Scoresby Sund Fjord. Museum Tusculanum Press. ISBN 87-635-1208-4.
