= Nikolaj Hartz =

Danish geologist and botanist

Nikolaj Eeg Kruse Hartz (23 August 1867 – 7 May 1937) was a Danish geologist and botanist. He was an important explorer of the flora of Greenland during several expeditions.

== Biography ==
Hartz was born in Randers, Denmark. He studied botany at the University of Copenhagen. In 1891-1892 he participated in the expedition to Scoresbysund and Tasiilaq led by Carl Ryder (1858-1923). He graduated in 1895 and obtained a Ph.D. in 1909 with a dissertation about the late-glacial flora and fauna of Denmark. From 1896, Hartz was a researcher at the Geological Survey of Denmark. In 1900 he participated in the Carlsbergfund Expedition to East Greenland under the leadership of G. C. Amdrup (1866-1947). He investigated plant and animal remains in deposits from before, during and after the last glaciation. Together with his colleague Vilhelm Milthers (1865–1962), he investigated a clay pit near Allerød in Denmark and found that a period with milder climate and birch forest – the Allerød oscillation - had interrupted the cold and dry Dryas stadial (Hartz & Milthers 1901).

In 1913, he abandoned his scientific career and became co-director of his brother's firm, Standard Mønsterforretning which had been established in Kristiania, Norway in 1900.

== Personal life ==
In 1901, he married Anna Berg. Their son was the painter Lauritz Hartz (1903-1987).

== Legacy ==
The grass species Poa hartzii was described by the French botanist Michel Gandoger (1920), who named it after Hartz because it was based on plants collected by Hartz in "Kordlunguak" at the Sullorsuaq Strait, West Greenland.

== See also ==
- Denmark expedition

== Other sources ==
- Jessen, Knud (1937) Nikolaj Eeg Kruse Hartz [obituary]. Botanisk Tidsskrift 44: 242–243.
- Jessen, Knud (1937) Nikolaj Eeg Kruse Hartz [obituary]. Bulletin of the Geological Society of Denmark 9 (2): 237–240. Full text
