= Bjorne Islands =

Island in Sermersooq, Greenland

Native name: Nannut Qeqertaat
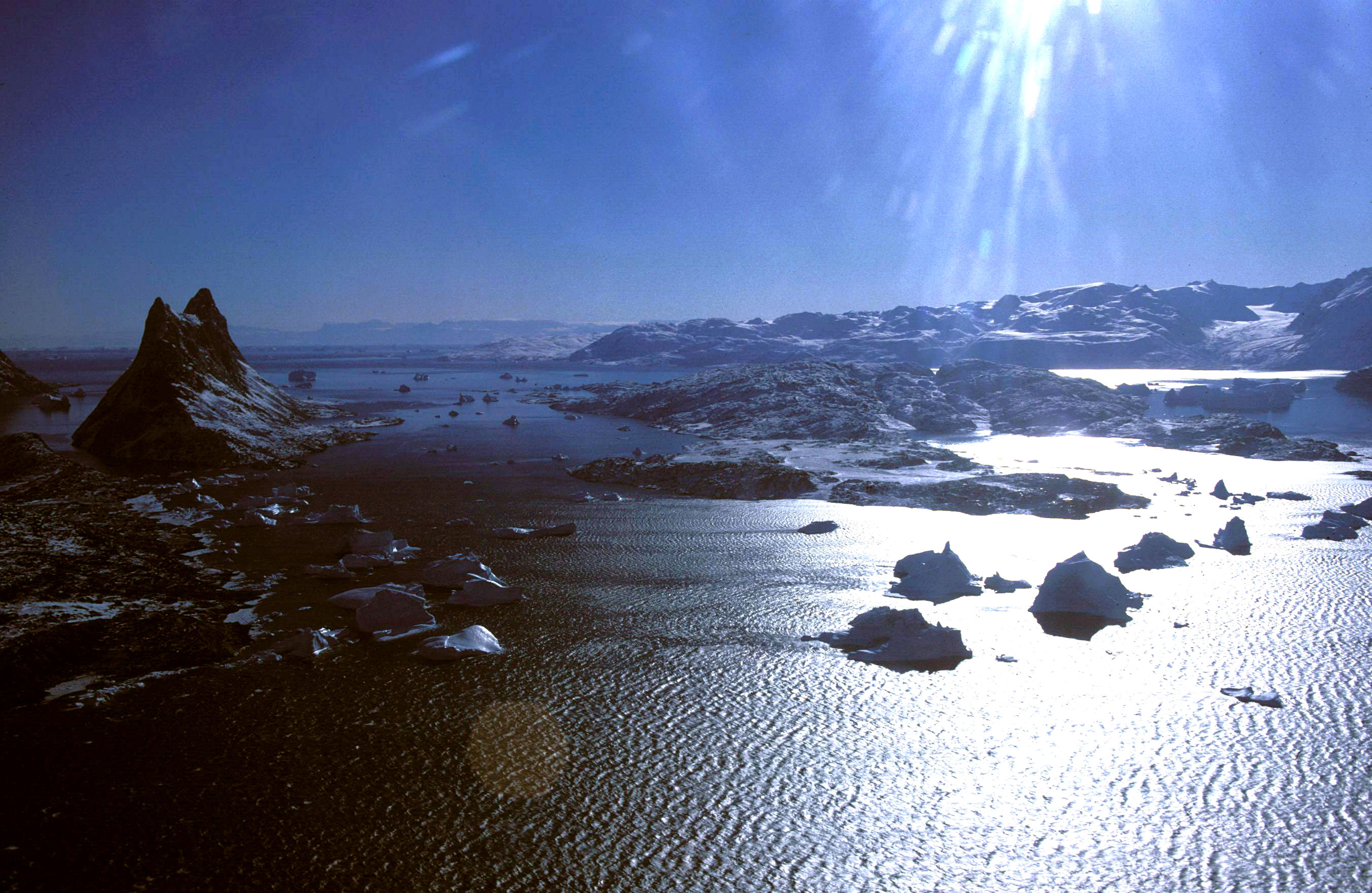
- View of the Bjorne Islands on the left and Ofjord on the right.

- Location of Bjorne Islands in Greenland
- Interactive map of Bjorne Islands
- Etymology: Danish meaning 'Bear Islands'

Geography
- Location: Scoresby Sound
- Coordinates: 71°7′N 25°28′W
- Total islands: 11+
- Major islands: Sulussuut
- Area: 86 km^{2} (33 sq mi)

Administration
- Greenland
- Municipality: Sermersooq

Demographics
- Population: 0 (2021)
- Pop. density: 0/km^{2} (0/sq mi)

Bjorne Islands, Danish: Bjørne Øer; Greenlandic: Nannut Qeqertaat) meaning 'Bear Islands', is an island group in the Scoresby Sound, NE Greenland. The islands are uninhabited.

Administratively they belong to the Sermersooq municipality.

== History ==
This island group was named by Carl Ryder in the course of his 1891–92 East Greenland Expedition, because a bear was shot while the islands were being surveyed on 4 September 1891.

Individual islands were not assigned names, but in 1934 they were numbered I to XI following the first survey carried out by Eduard Wenk and Helge Backlund. Members of the 1934 surveying group climbed parts of the spectacular ridges of islands VI and IX (Första Nålbrevet and Sista Nålbrevet). Further climbs were reported in 1978 by an expedition of the British Army.

== Geography ==
The Bjorne Islands are a cluster of small islands that lie in the Hall Gulf (Hall Bredning), off the right side of the mouth of Ofjord, south of the mouth of Nordvestfjord. 8 km (5.0 mi) The southern tip of the southernmost island rises 6 km (3.7 mi) north of Bregnepynt, the northeastern end of Milne Land. The biggest two islands are about 7.5 km (4.7 mi) in length.

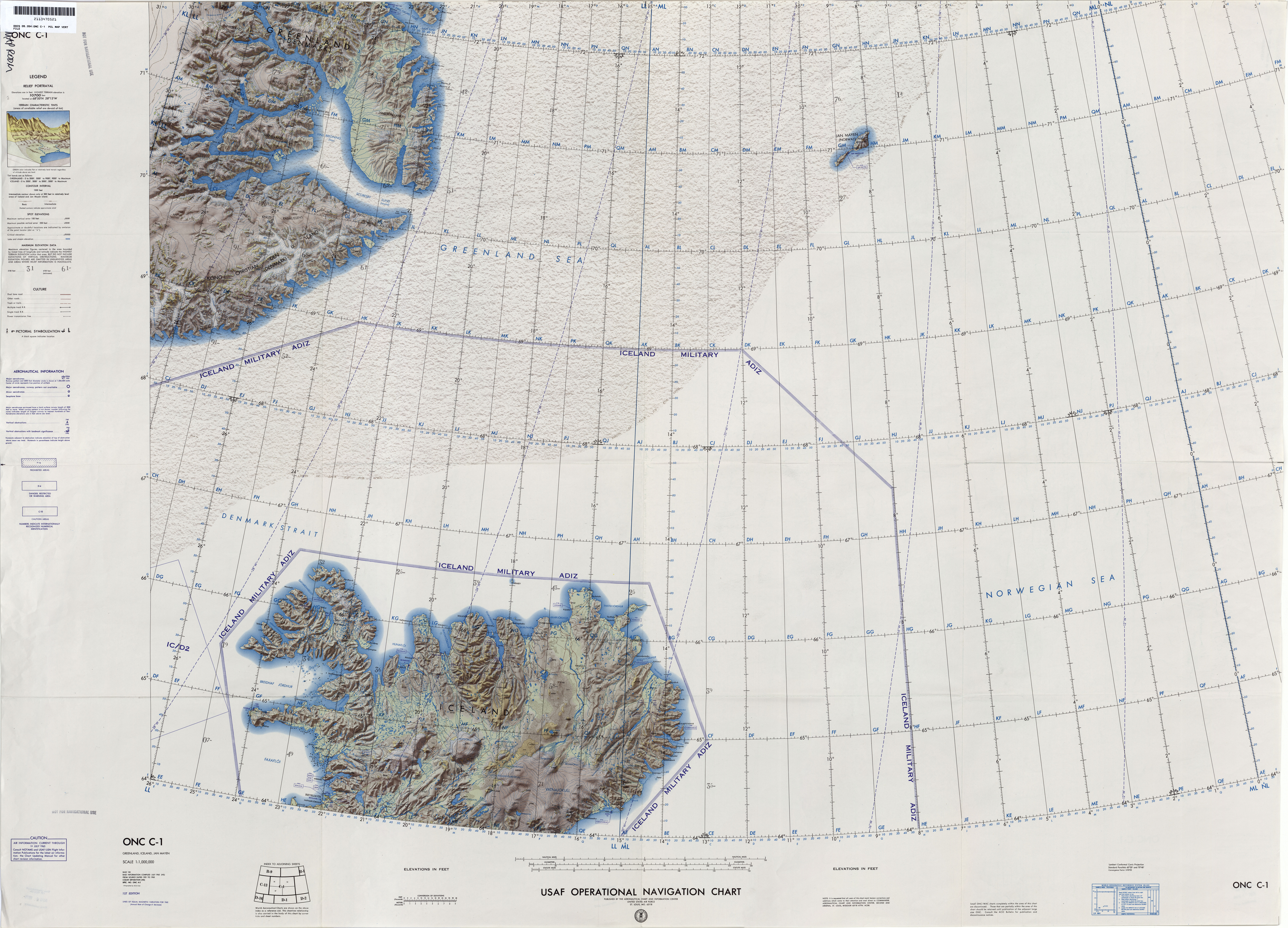
Map of NE Greenland and Iceland.

== See also ==
- List of islands of Greenland

== Bibliography ==
- Kalsbeek, F. 1969: Preliminary report on the geology of Bjørneøer, Scoresby Sund. Rapport Grønlands Geologiske Undersøgelse 26, 33 pp.
