= Rode Fjord =

Fjord in Greenland

- Røde Fjord
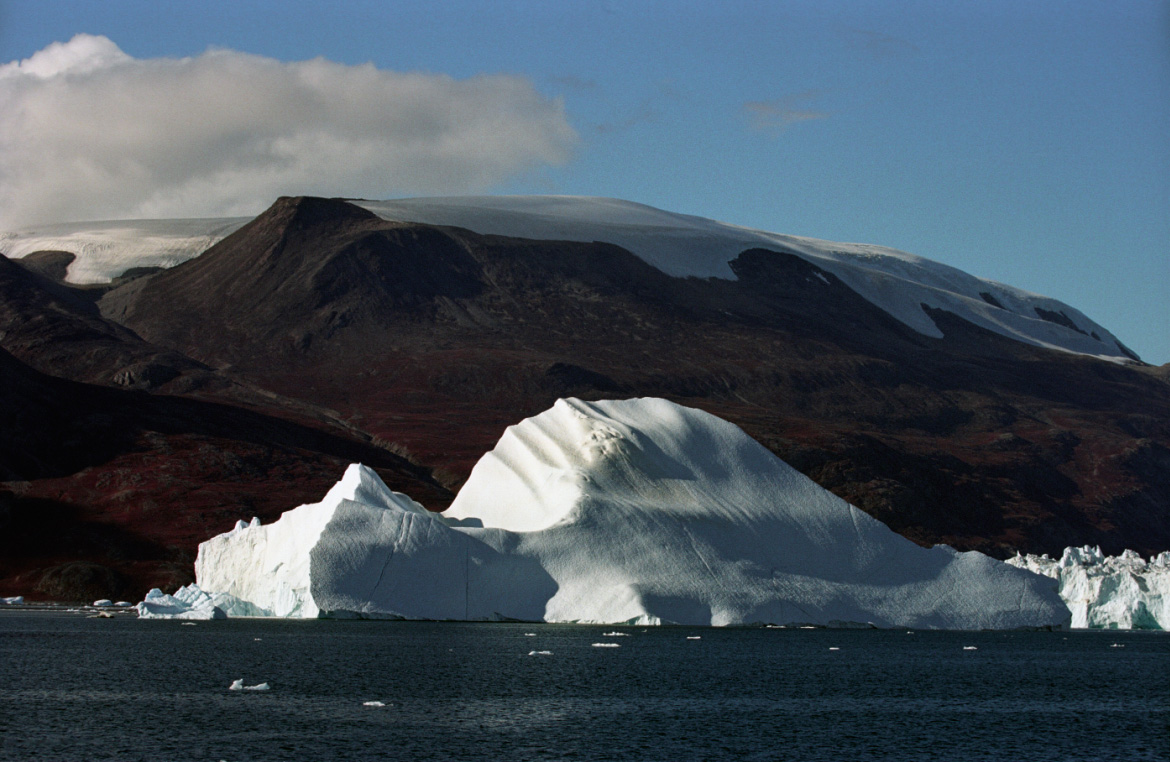
- View of the mountainous shore and an ice floe in Rode Fjord.

- Location in Greenland
- Location: Arctic
- Coordinates: 70°39′N 27°56′W
- Ocean/sea sources: Scoresby Sound; Greenland Sea
- Basin countries: Greenland
- Max. length: 50 km (31 mi)
- Max. width: 11 km (6.8 mi)

Rode Fjord (Danish: Røde Fjord, meaning 'Red Fjord') is a fjord in King Christian X Land, eastern Greenland. The Rode Fjord is part of the Scoresby Sound complex in the area of Sermersooq municipality.

== Geography ==
The 5 km (3.1 mi) to 11 km (6.8 mi) wide Rode Fjord is located in the inner Scoresby Sound. At its southern end the fjord is a northerly continuation of the Fonfjord. On the western shore, near the confluence, the Rolige Brae glacier flows into the fjord and a little further south the Vestfjord branches off to the west. There is a small island in the area named Rode Island (Røde Ø).

At the northern end the Rode Fjord is a southern offshoot of the Ofjord. From the confluence of the Ofjord, the Hare Fjord runs in a westerly direction and the Rype Fjord branches to the northwest while the wider Rode Fiord branches to the southwest off the western shore of Storo Island for about 50 km (31 mi). This fjord separates the larger island of Milne Land from the mainland coast in the west. The Snesund is a shorter fjord branching off in a northeasterly direction about halfway through the Rode Fjord separating Storo and Sorte Island from Milne Land.

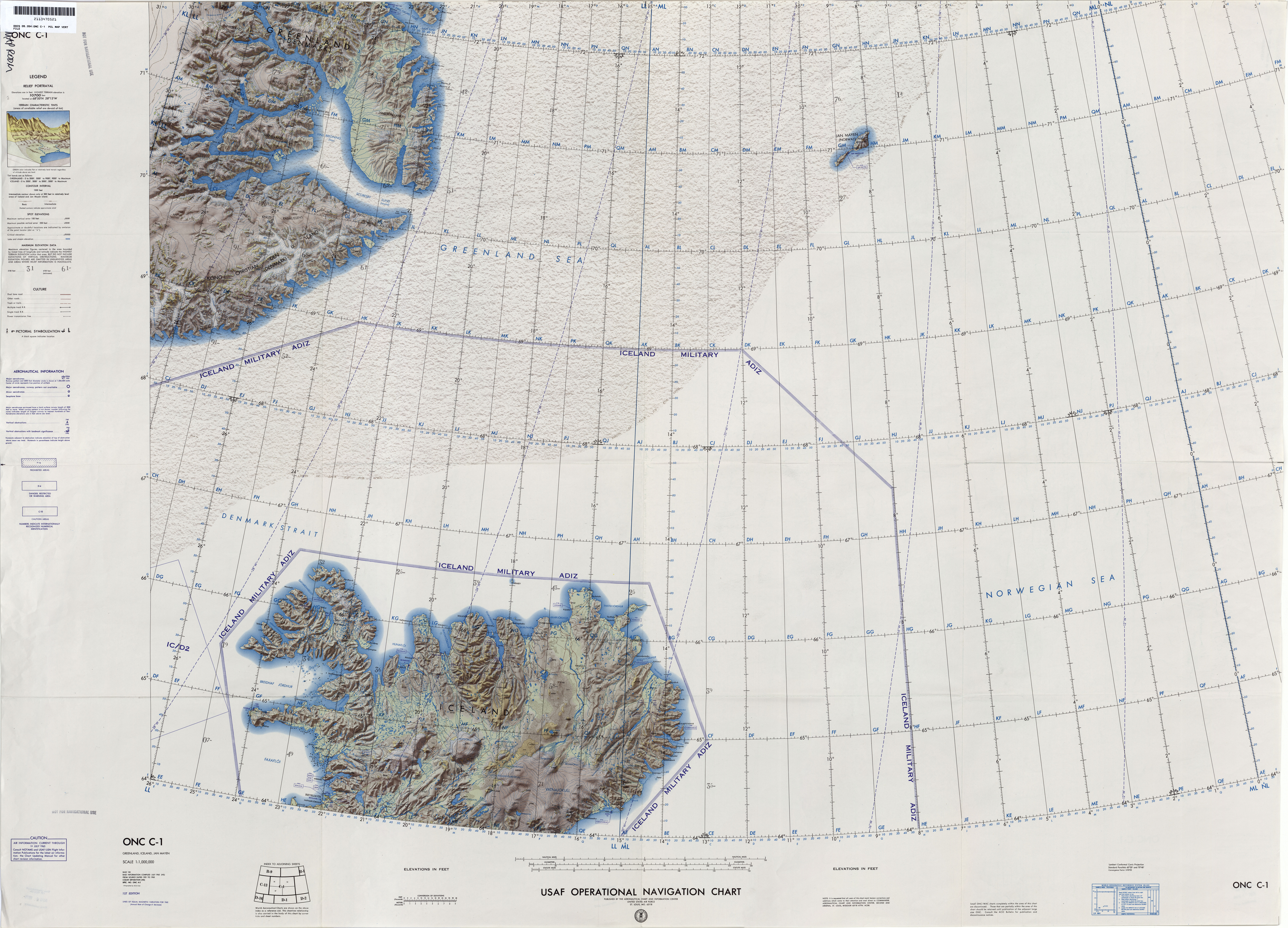
Map of NE Greenland and Iceland.

== See also ==
- List of fjords of Greenland
