= Scoresby Sound =

Bay in eastern Greenland

- Scoresby Sund
- Kangertittivaq (Greenlandic)
- Location in Greenland

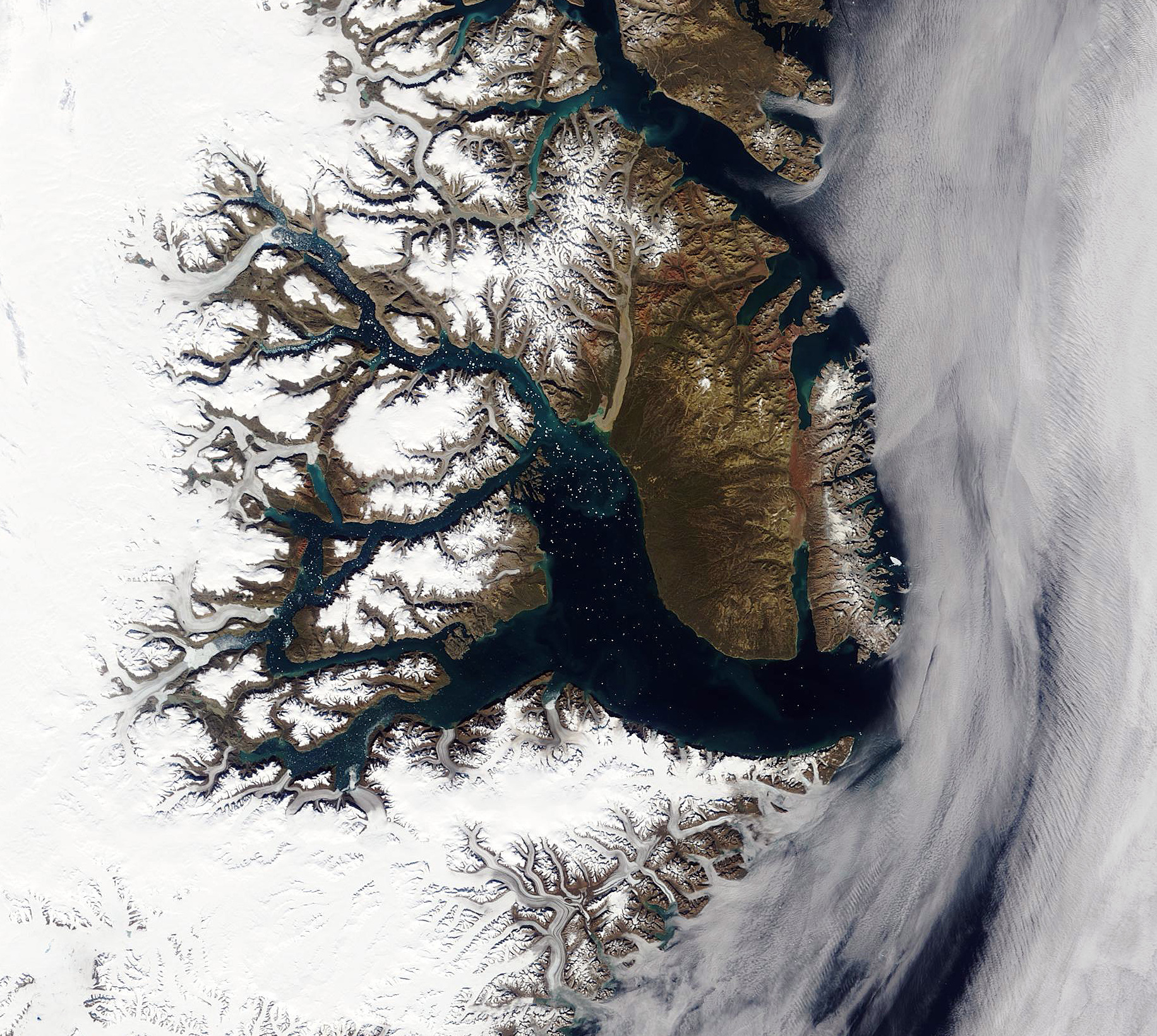
- Satellite image of Scoresby Sound
- Coordinates: 70°30′N 25°00′W
- Basin countries: Greenland
- Average depth: 500 m (1,640 ft)
- Max. depth: 1,450 m (4,757 ft)

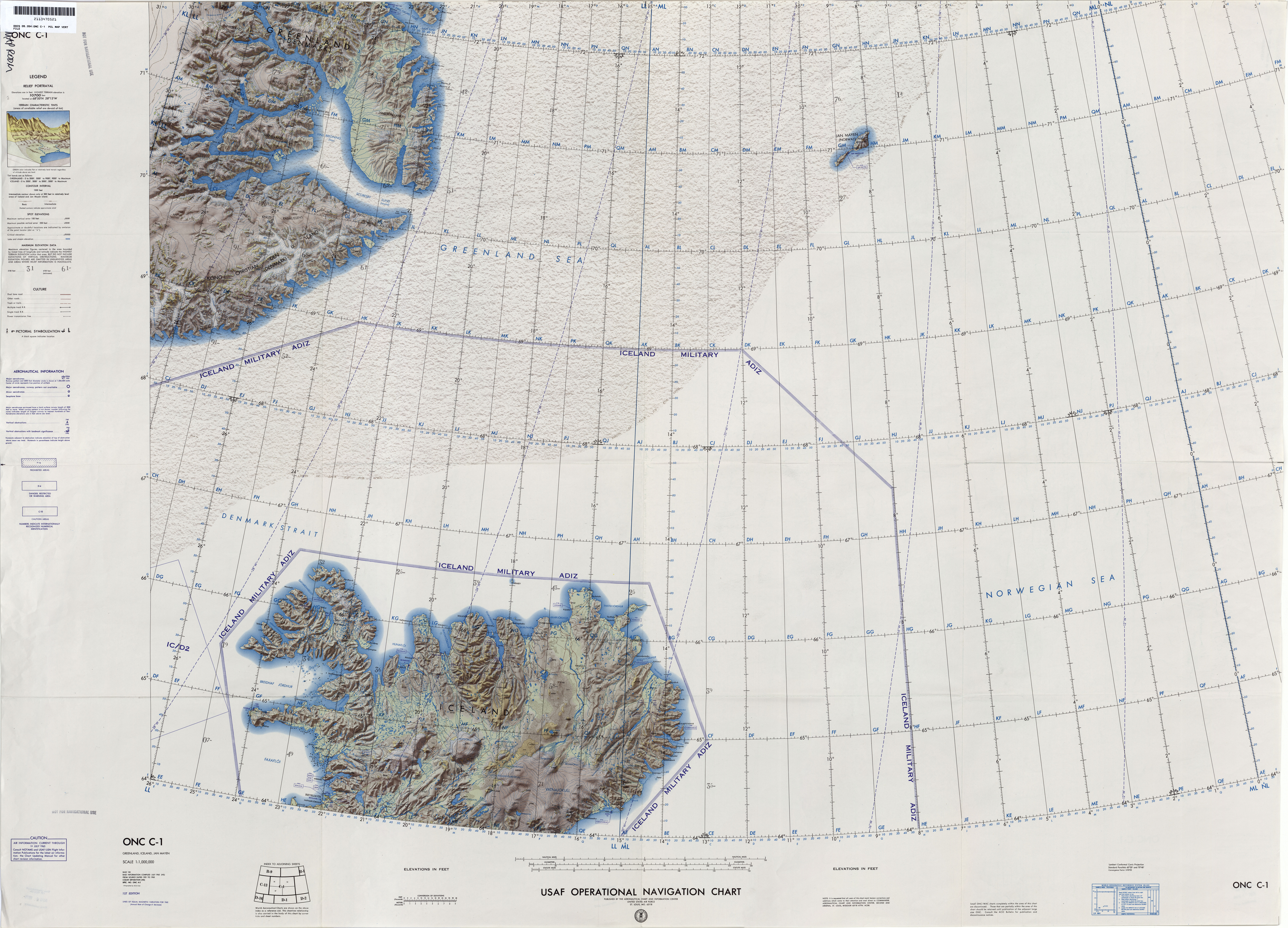
Map of Greenland Sea, showing Scoresby Sound at top left.

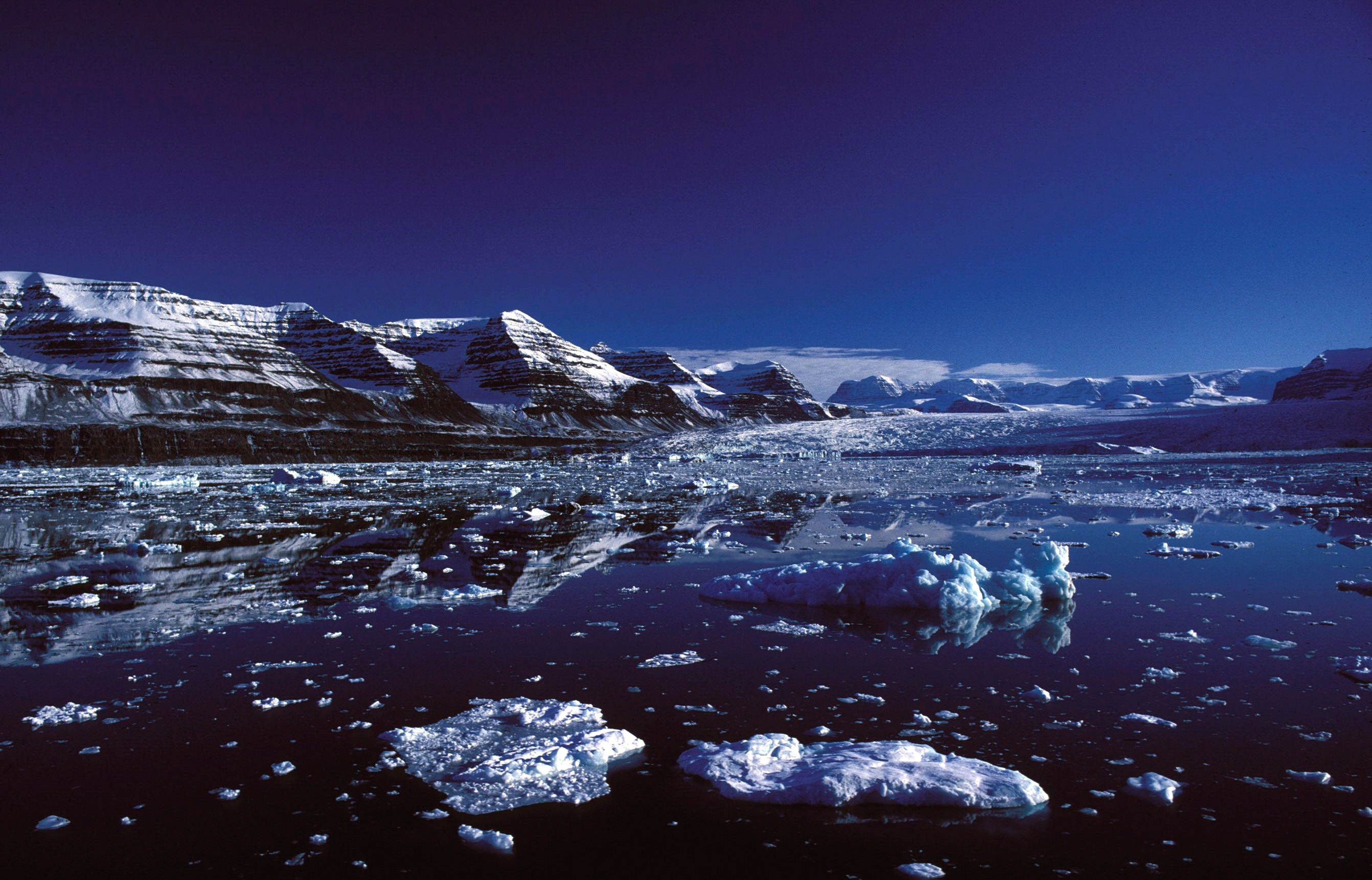
Scoresby Sound

Scoresby Sound (Danish: Scoresby Sund, Greenlandic: Kangertittivaq) is a large fjord system of the Greenland Sea on the eastern coast of Greenland. It has a tree-like structure, with a main body approximately 110 km (68 mi) long that branches into a system of fjords covering an area of about 38,000 km^{2} (14,700 sq mi). The longest of the fjords extends 340–350 km (210–220 mi) inland from the coastline. The depth is 400–600 m (1,300–2,000 ft) in the main basin, but depths increase to up to 1,450 m (4,760 ft) in some fjords. It is one of the largest and longest fjord systems in the world.

The name of the sound honours English explorer William Scoresby, who in 1822 mapped the fjord area in detail. The name “Sound” comes from the Scandinavian word “Sund” for “strait”, which is commonly used to describe narrow waterways between landmasses.

== Geography ==
Scoresby Sound lies between Jameson Land to the north, and King Christian IX Land to the south. To the west beyond Milne Island is the Renland peninsula. The land surrounding the fjord is mostly mountainous, with steep rising edges. The mouth is 29 km wide between the Kangikajik (Cape Brewster, 70°09' N) at the end of the Savoia Peninsula and Uunarteq (Cape Tobin 70°24' N). Its southern part is a steep, 1,000–2,000 m (3,300–6,600 ft) tall wall of basalt, and the northern side is lower and more rounded. The sound extends for about 110 km (68 mi) to the west of the mouth, turns northwest, widens, and forms a basin called Hall Bredning.

=== Settlements ===
On the northern side of the mouth of the Scoresby Sound stands Ittoqqortoormiit, the only permanent settlement in the region, with a population of 326 in 2026. At Nordost Bugt on Jameson Land is the Gurreholm research station (71°14′43″N 24°35′01″W), founded in 1937. During the Second World War it was the site of the US Coastguard’s Bluie East Three weather station.

=== Main fjords ===
The Hall Bredning basin splits into several branches including the Nordvestfjord, Ofjord (Øfjord)—which splits into the Rype Fjord and Hare Fjord, Rode Fjord (Røde Fjord), Gase Fjord (Gåsefjord) and Fonfjord (Fønfjord). Between the Ofjord and Fonfjord lies the largest island of the system, Milne Land.

- Fonfjord (Fønfjord)
  - Rode Fjord (Røde Fjord)
  - Vestfjord
- Gaasefjord (Gåsefjord)
- Hurry Inlet
- Ofjord (Øfjord)
  - Hare Fjord
  - Rype Fjord
  - Snesund
- Nordvestfjord
  - Flyver Fjord

=== Islands ===
Among the islands in the Scoresby Sound, the largest by far is Milne Land, with the other islands in the sound near it. Milne Land has an area of 3,913 km^{2} (1,511 sq mi) and is located in the west-center part of the basin. Other islands are Storo and Sorte Island off the northwestern shore of Milne Land, Rode Island further south in Rode Fjord, Danmark Island off Milne Land's southern coast, and the Bjorne Islands off the northeastern headland of Milne Land.

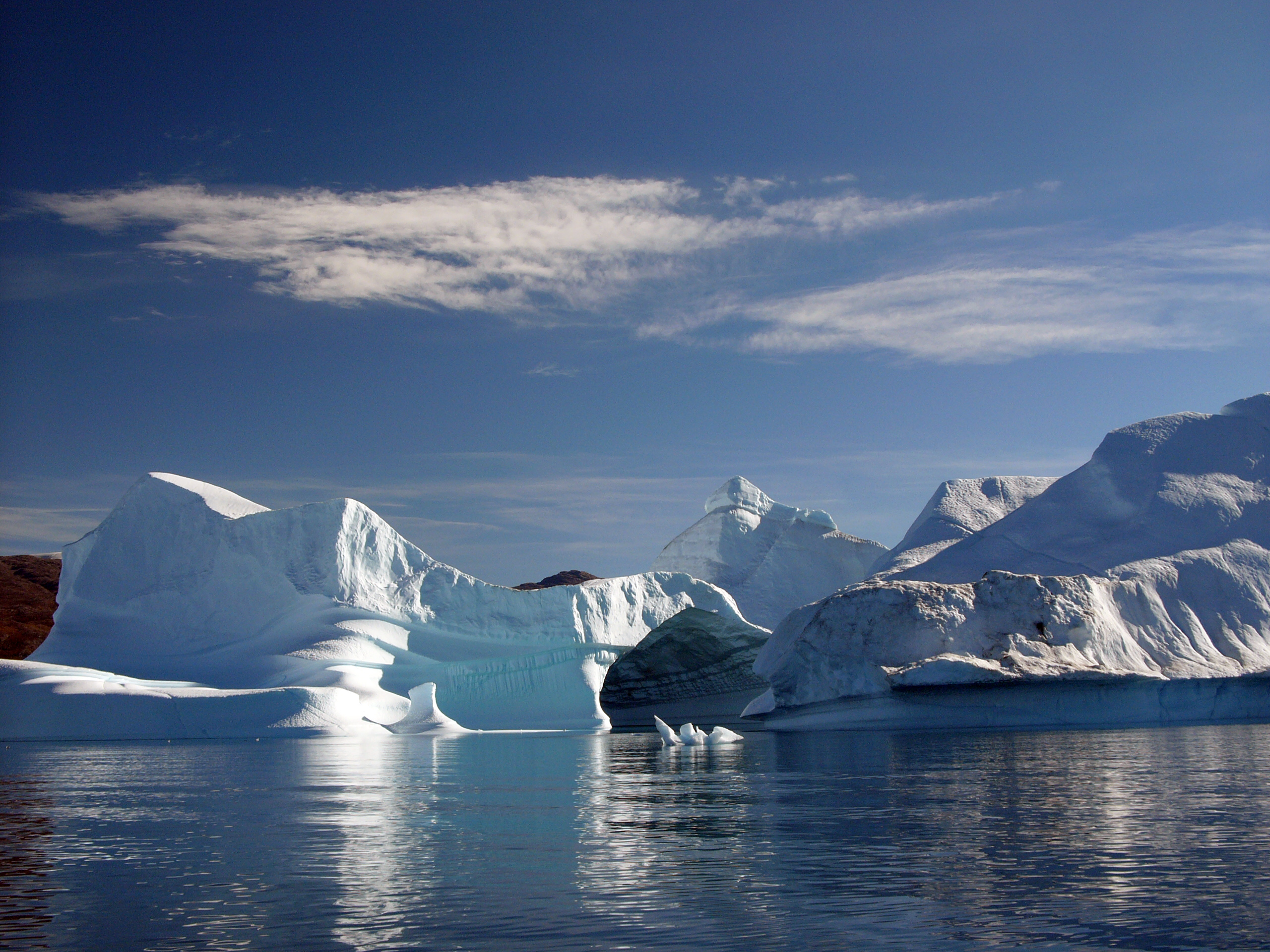
Scoresby Sound in 2007

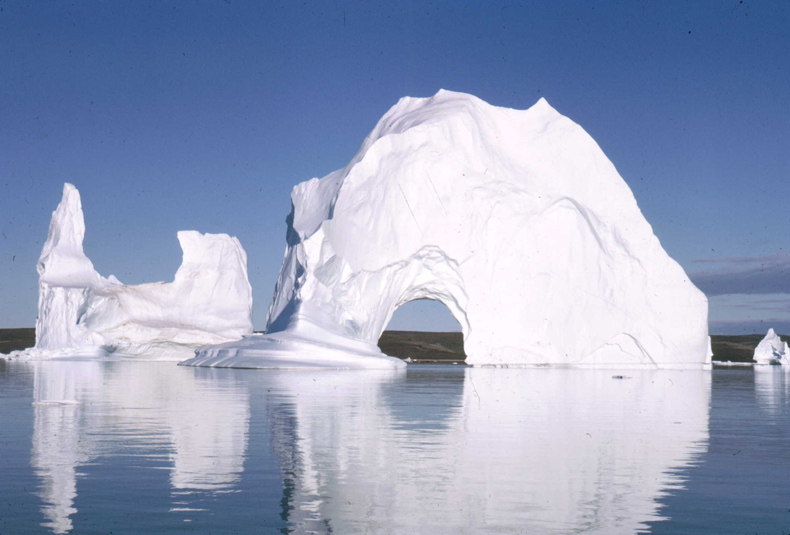
Icebergs in July, 1970

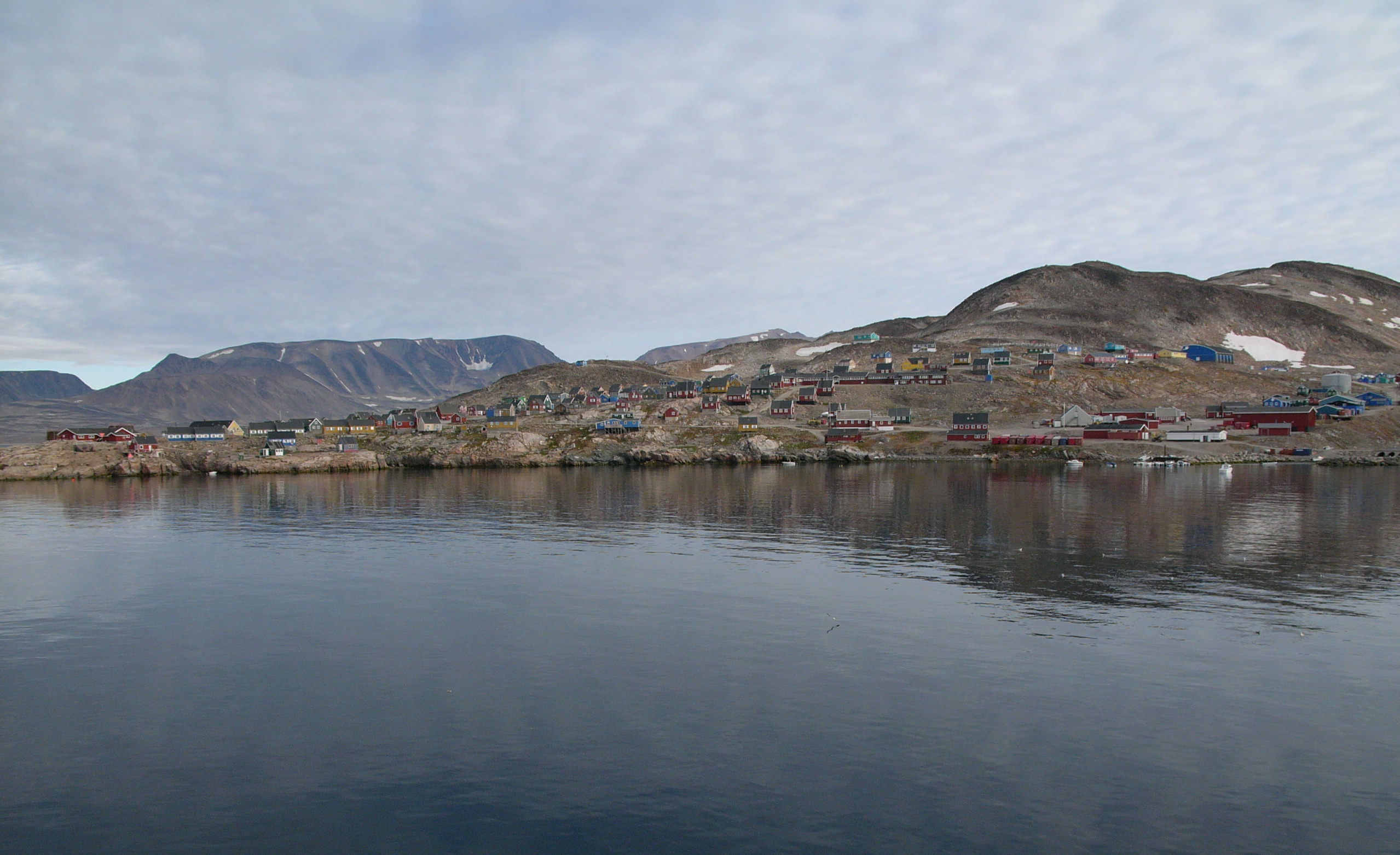
View of Ittoqqortoormiit in summer

== Climate ==
The climate is Arctic, with long, cold winters and severe storms. The temperatures of January–March vary between −22.5 °C (−8.5 °F) and −8.4 °C (16.9 °F) with the average between −15 °C (5 °F) and −18 °C (0 °F) over the period 1971–1981. The mean summer temperatures are below 5 °C (41 °F). Precipitation is low, at about 30 mm (1.2 in) per month. Tides are semidiurnal, with the amplitude of 1.3 meters (4 feet 3 inches).

Climate data for Scoresby Sound
Month	Jan	Feb	Mar	Apr	May	Jun	Jul	Aug	Sep	Oct	Nov	Dec	Year
Mean daily maximum °C (°F)	−16 (3)	−17 (1)	−11 (12)	−3 (27)	2 (36)	3 (37)	5 (41)	1 (34)	−7 (19)	−13 (9)	−20 (−4)	−18 (0)	−8 (18)
Average precipitation mm (inches)	20 (0.8)	35 (1.4)	75 (3.0)	70 (2.8)	10 (0.4)	20 (0.8)	5 (0.2)	3 (0.1)	40 (1.6)	30 (1.2)	20 (0.8)	30 (1.2)	358 (14.3)
Source: Scoresby Sund climate

== Fauna ==
Tundra vegetation at Sydkap, inner Scoresby Sound

The fauna of the region is unusually rich for Greenland. This is because of several factors, such as availability of open water in the mouth, with polynyas not freezing even in winter, protection from the winds by the high relief, and relatively fertile land. The land animals include muskox, Arctic fox, stoat, Arctic hare and the northern collared lemming. Reindeer and the Greenland wolf used to live in the area, the former disappearing entirely and the latter disappearing as a reproducing population. Reindeer (specifically the subspecies East Greenland caribou) disappeared at the start of the 20th century, while Greenland wolves disappeared in 1939, recolonizing the area by 1983 before disappearing again after 1998. Since then, only transient wolves are found in the area around Ittoqqortoormiit.

Birds are represented by barnacle goose, pink-footed goose, snow goose, whooper swan, king eider, common eider, long-tailed duck, Brunnich's guillemot, black guillemot, little auk, puffin, fulmar, herring gull, glaucous gull, great black-backed gull, kittiwake, Arctic tern, red-throated diver, great northern diver, red-breasted merganser, ptarmigan, raven, snowy owl, Greenlandic gyrfalcon, etc. Most of them are migrating species and form large colonies which may contain up to millions of individuals (for little auk).

Fishes of the area include Arctic char, Greenland halibut, polar cod, cuttlefish, wolf fish and Greenland shark. Aquatic mammals are dominated by seals (ringed, hooded, harbor, bearded and harp seal) which feed on fish in winter (mostly polar cod) and crustaceans in summer. Larger species include Atlantic walrus, narwhal and sometimes beluga whale. Atlantic walrus feeds on mussels, fish and ringed seals, making it advantageous for ringed seals to disappear from the area when walruses are present for prolonged periods. Narwhals consume polar cod, Greenland halibut, cuttlefish, and pelagic crustaceans.

Muskox	Arctic fox	Little auk	Atlantic puffin	stoat

== See also ==
- List of fjords of Greenland
- List of research stations in the Arctic
- Scoresby Land

== Bibliography ==
- Archaeology and Environment in the Scoresby Sund Fjord. Museum Tusculanum Press. 1991. ISBN 87-635-1208-4.
