= HDMS Fylla =

Danish steam ironclad

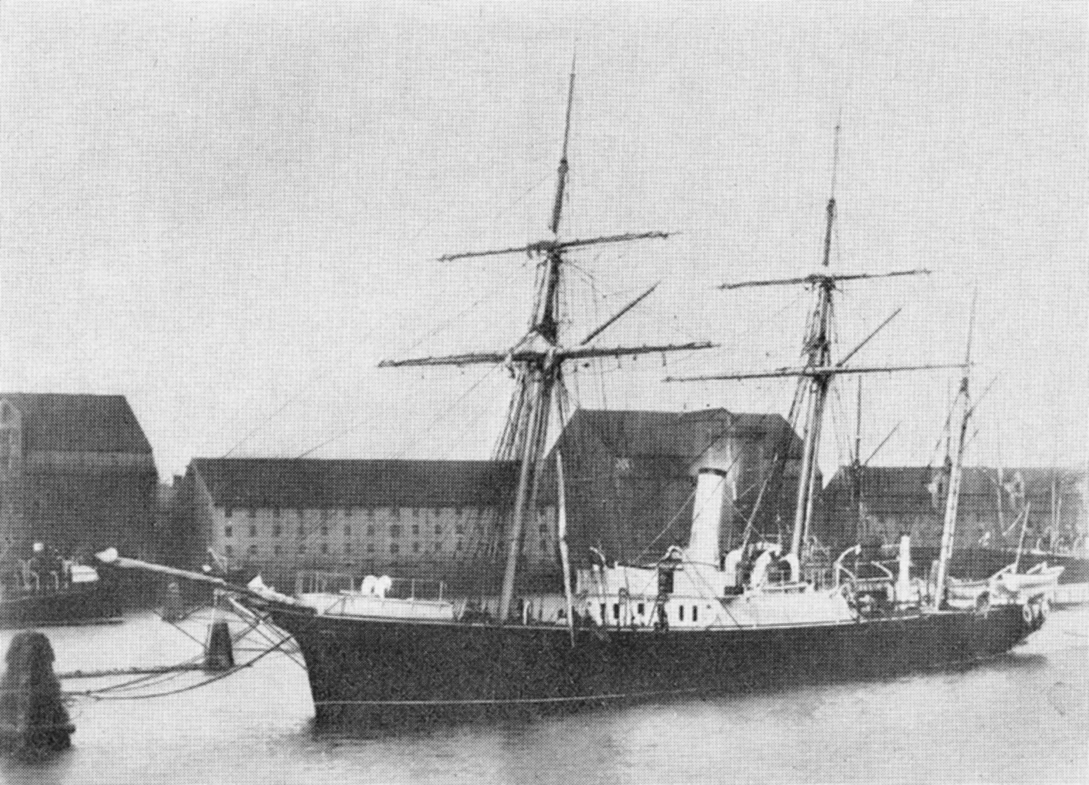
- Fylla in Copenhagen, 1888

History

Denmark
- Name: Fylla
- Builder: Royal Naval Shipyard, Copenhagen
- Yard number: 51
- Laid down: 13 June 1861
- Launched: 1 July 1862
- Commissioned: 1863
- Decommissioned: 3 Sept. 1894
- Homeport: Copenhagen
- Identification: Call sign: GRBV
- Fate: Broken up 1903

General characteristics
- Class & type: Steam gunboat
- Displacement: 498/560 Ton
- Length: 47.8 m (157 ft)
- Beam: 7.9 m (26 ft)
- Draught: 3.1 m (10 ft)
- Propulsion: Baumgarten & Burmeister 150nHP
- Sail plan: Top sail schooner
- Complement: 84
- Armament: 1863: 1 60 lb cannon, 2 30 lb cannons; 1864:1 60 lb cannon, 2 18 lb rifled cannons; 1885: 6 97 mm cannons, 2 37 mm revolver cannons

HDMS Fylla was a Danish gunboat, launched in 1862. Fylla was built entirely in wood, rigged as a topsail schooner and equipped with a steam-driven propeller. The propeller could be raised up into a well when under sail. Original armament was turning cannons placed in the midline of the ship, but later replaced by smaller cannons on each side of the ship.

== Service ==
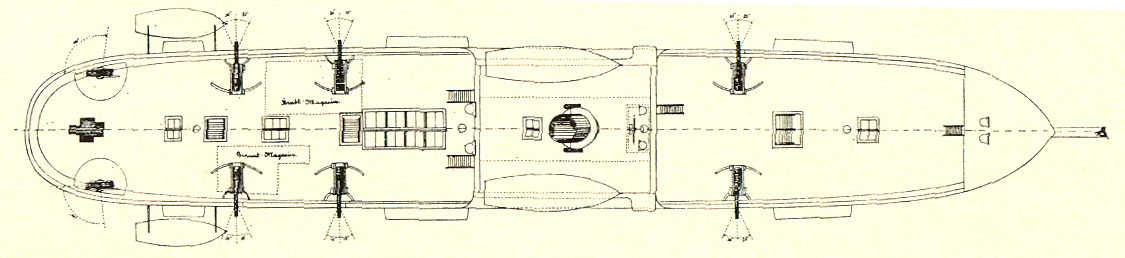
Plan of gun deck, after rearmament in 1882

Fylla's first voyage was to the Danish West Indies in 1863, but she was called back in 1864 because of the second Schleswig war. During most of her career Fylla served as inspection ship and coast guard around the Faroes, Iceland and Greenland, but also as fisheries inspection ship in the North Sea in 1880-81. Major repairs and rearmament with more, but smaller cannons, in 1881-82. Fylla was decommissioned in 1894 and broken up in 1903.
