= Rype Fjord =

Fjord in eastern Greenland

- Aqissip Kangertiva (Greenlandic)
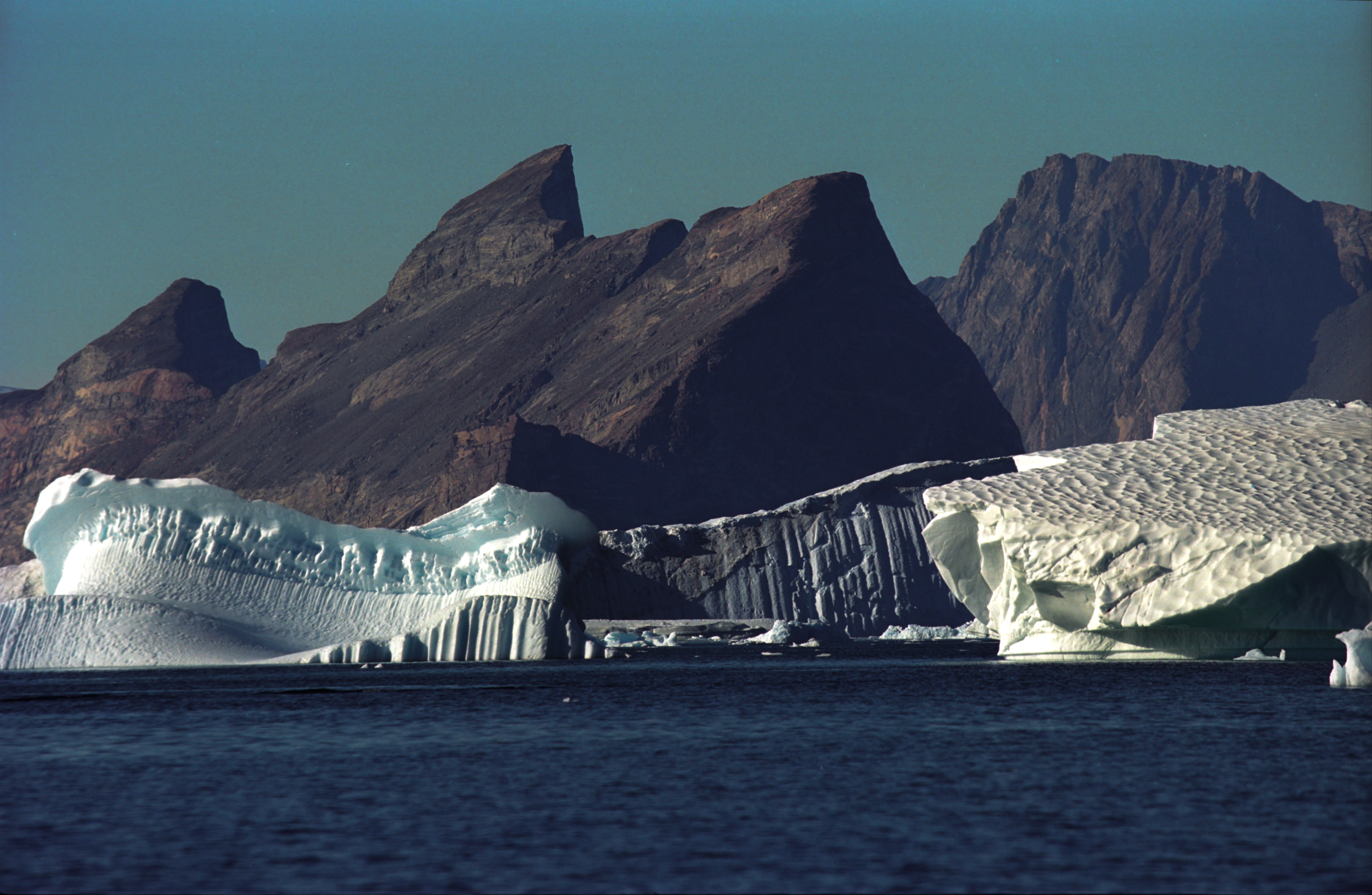
- View of ice floes and the craggy shore in Rype Fjord.

- Location in Greenland
- Location: Arctic
- Coordinates: 71°1′N 27°44′W
- Ocean/sea sources: Scoresby Sound; Greenland Sea
- Basin countries: Greenland
- Max. length: 30 km (19 mi)
- Max. width: 5 km (3.1 mi)

Rype Fjord (Greenlandic: Aqissip Kangertiva; Danish: Rypefjord, meaning 'Grouse Fjord') is a fjord in King Christian X Land, eastern Greenland. This fjord is part of the Scoresby Sound system in the area of Sermersooq municipality.

== Geography ==
The 2.5 km (1.6 mi) to 5 km (3.1 mi) wide and roughly 30 km (19 mi) long Rype Fjord is located in the inner Scoresby Sound.

This fjord is an offshoot of the Ofjord (Øfjord). At the confluence the Rype Fjord branches to the northwest off the northern shore of the Ofjord, while the Hare Fjord runs in a westerly direction and the Rode Fjord branches towards the south. The Eielson Glacier is at the fjord's head flowing from the west. The glacier tongue is about 25 kilometers NW of the mouth of the fjord.

The fjord is only 2.9 km wide at the mouth, becoming broader towards the north until reaching a width of over 5 km. To the northeast the fjord is bound by Renland and to the west by Grabenland where there is a summit reaching a height of 1,877.5 m (6,160 ft) above the glacier.

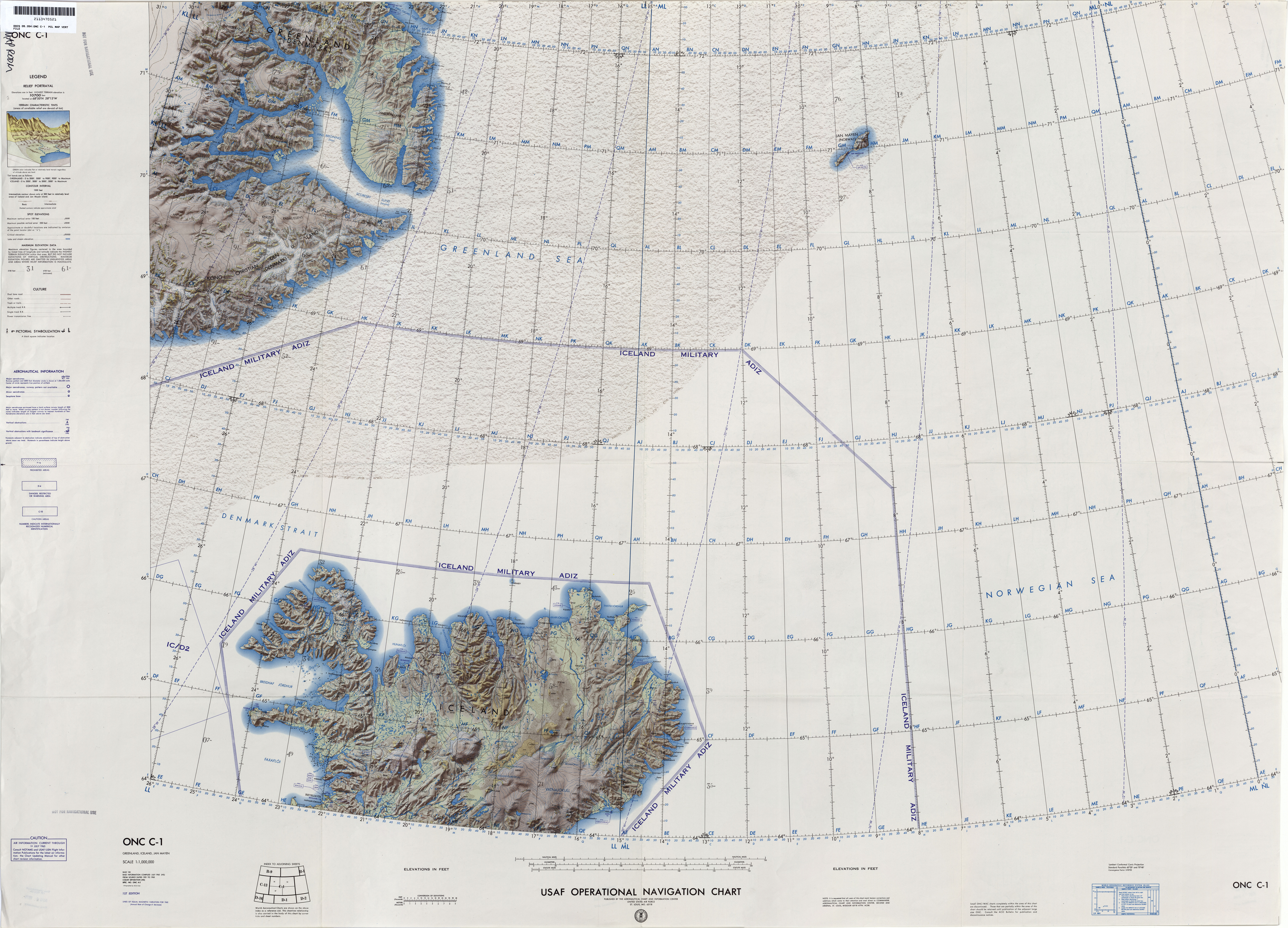
Map of NE Greenland and Iceland.

== See also ==
- List of fjords of Greenland
