= Milne Land =

Island in Greenland

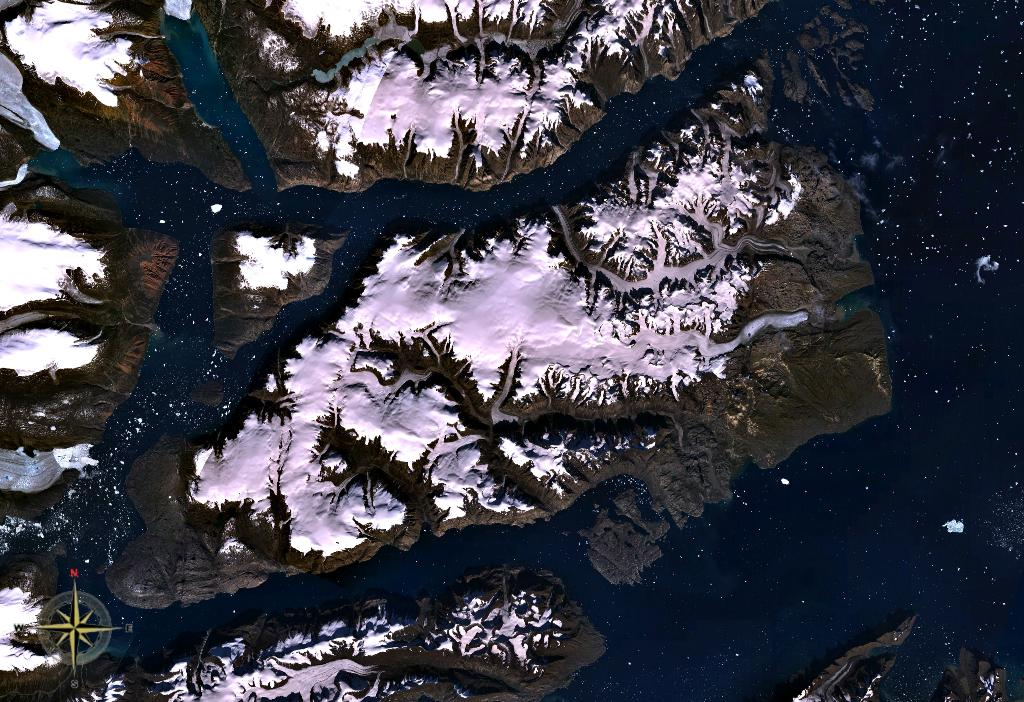
- Milne Land seen from space

- Location of Milne Land in Greenland
- Interactive map of Milne Land
- Etymology: Named after British admiral David Milne

Geography
- Location: Scoresby Sound
- Coordinates: 70°41′N 26°45′W
- Archipelago: Milneland Archipelago
- Adjacent to: Greenland Sea
- Area: 3,913 km^{2} (1,511 sq mi)
- Area rank: 3rd largest in Greenland; 140th largest in world
- Length: 113 km (70.2 mi)
- Width: 45 km (28 mi)
- Highest elevation: 2,110 m (6920 ft)
- Highest point: Unnamed

Administration
- Greenland
- Municipality: Sermersooq

Demographics
- Population: 0 (2021)
- Pop. density: 0/km^{2} (0/sq mi)
- Ethnic groups: none

Milne Land or Milneland is a large island in eastern Greenland. It is the third largest island of Greenland, after the main island of Greenland and Disko Island. It is named after British admiral David Milne.

This island is popular among climbers.

== Geography ==
The island is 113 km (70 mi) long from Moræne Point in the southwest to Bregne Point in the northeast, up to 45 km (28 mi) wide, and 3,913 km^{2} (1,511 sq mi) in area. It is part of an archipelago, which includes Storo and Sorte Island in the Northwest, Denmark Island in the south, and the Bjorne Islands in the northeast. Cape Leslie is Milneland's southeastern headland.

Milne Land is separated from the Renland peninsula in the north by the 6 to 10 km (6.2 mi) wide Ofjord, from the Gaaseland peninsula in the south by the 4 to 6 km (3.7 mi) wide Fonfjord, and from the mainland coast in the west by the 4 to 14 km (8.7 mi) wide Rode Fjord.

Jameson Land, the large peninsula in the east with the settlement of Ittoqqortoormiit on its southern coast, is located more than 40 km (25 mi) away across the Scoresby Sound.

== Image gallery ==
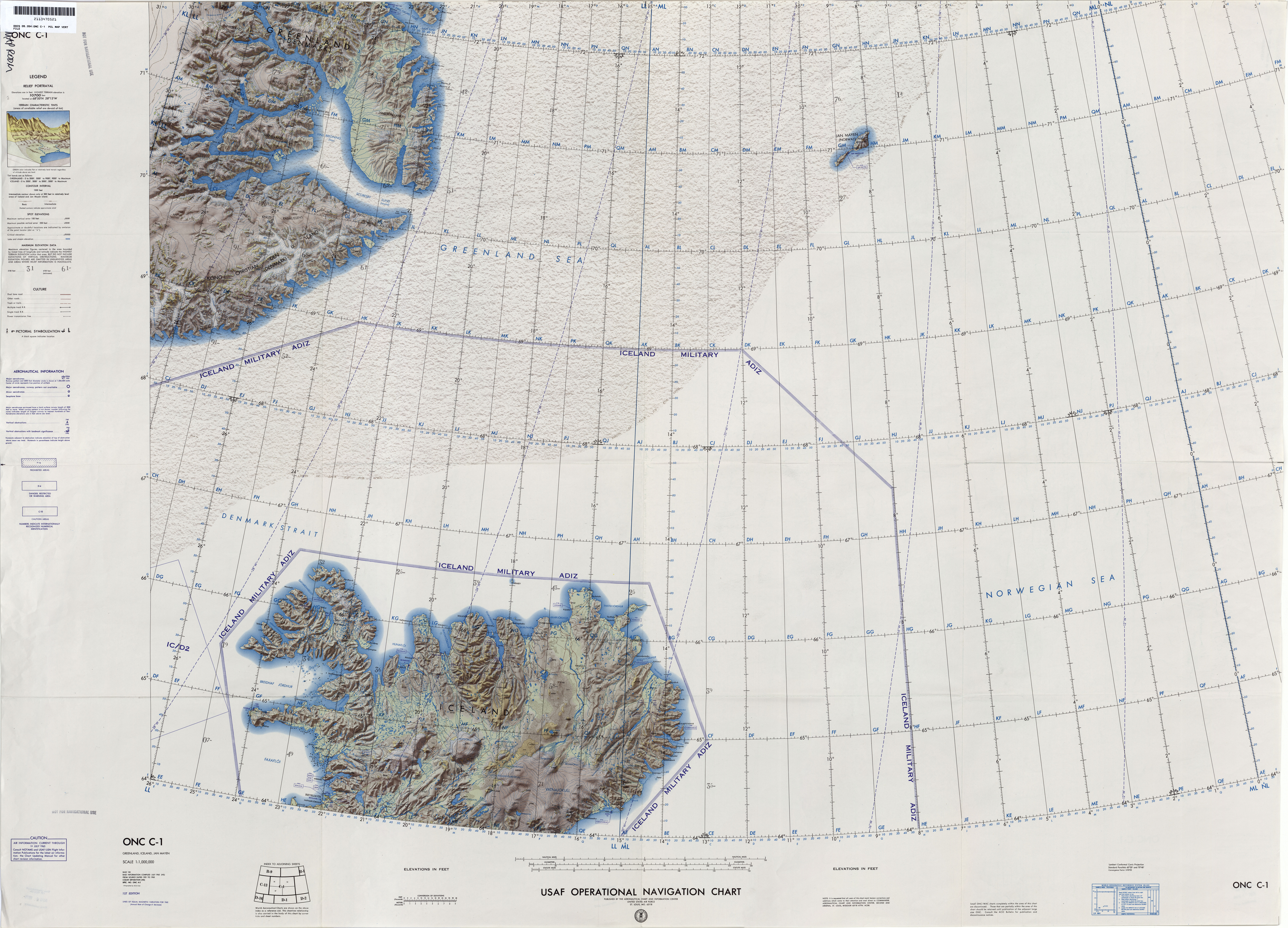
Map of NE Greenland and Iceland. Milne Land is at upper left, in the large fjord (Scoresby Sound) on the coast of Greenland.

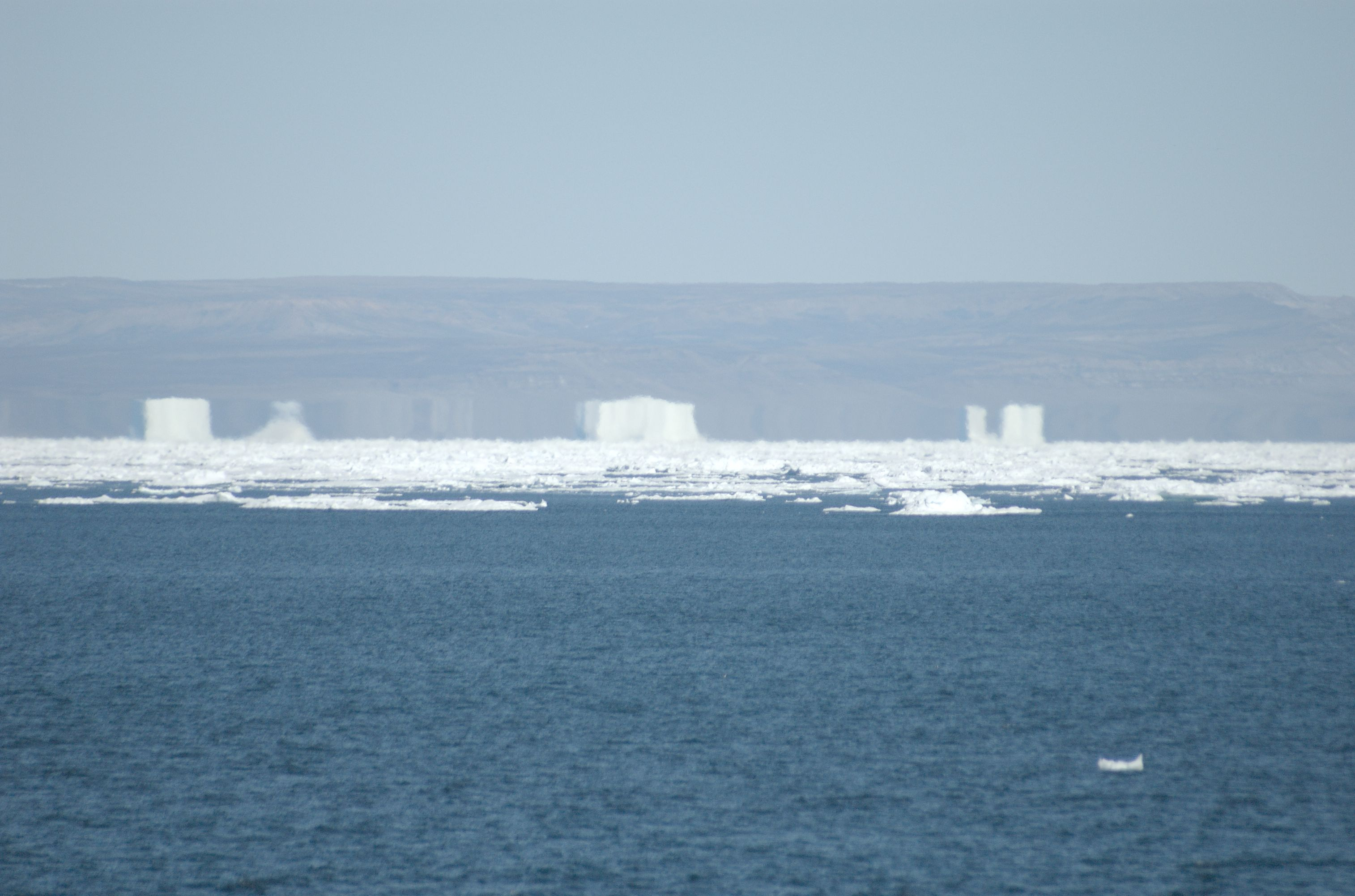
A superior mirage of sea ice and land near Milne Land.

== See also ==
- List of islands of Greenland
- Constable Point, the nearest airport.
- Liverpool Land
- Renland
- Scoresby Sound
