= Carl Ryder =

Danish naval officer and Arctic explorer

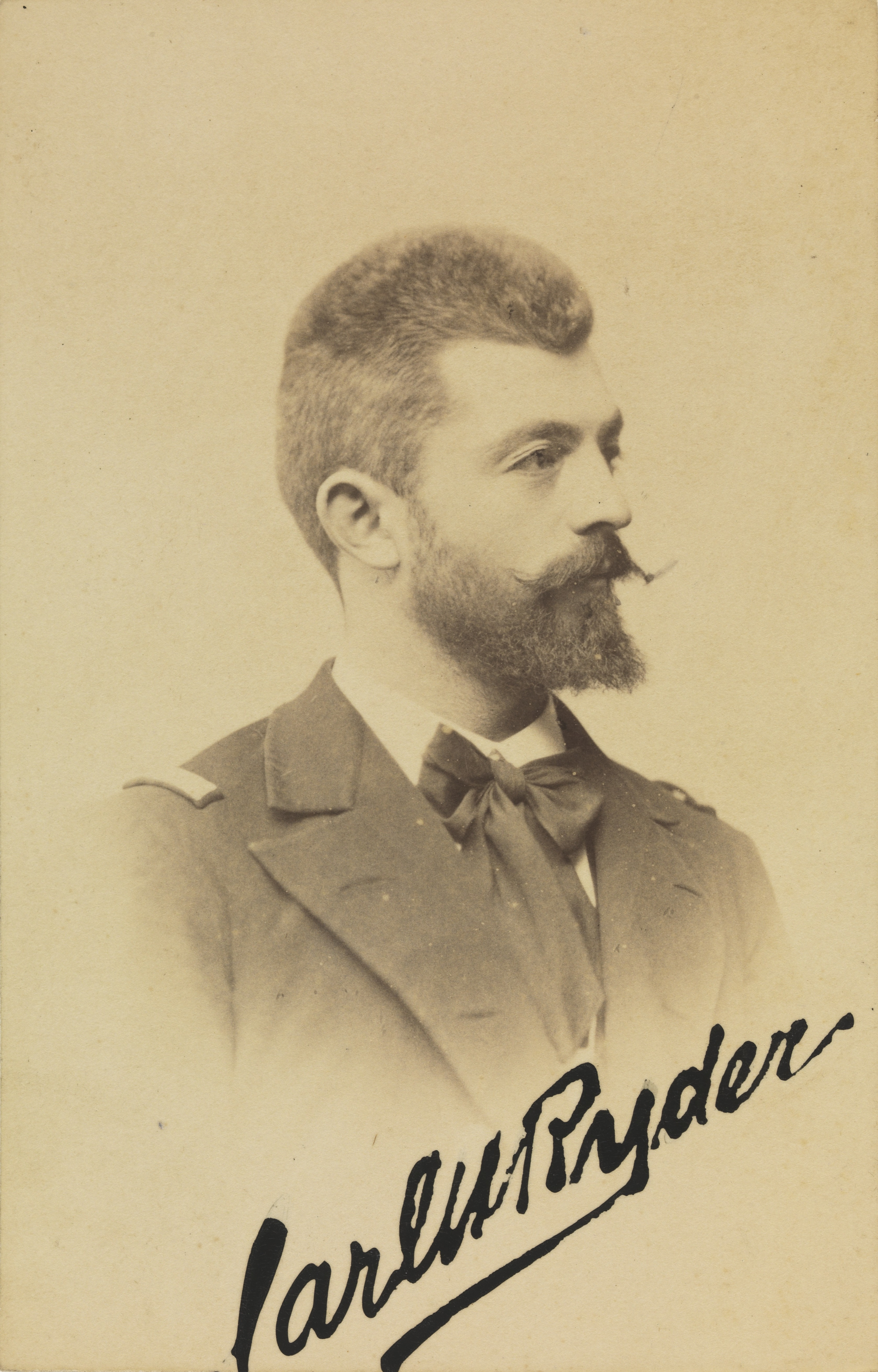
Carl Ryder

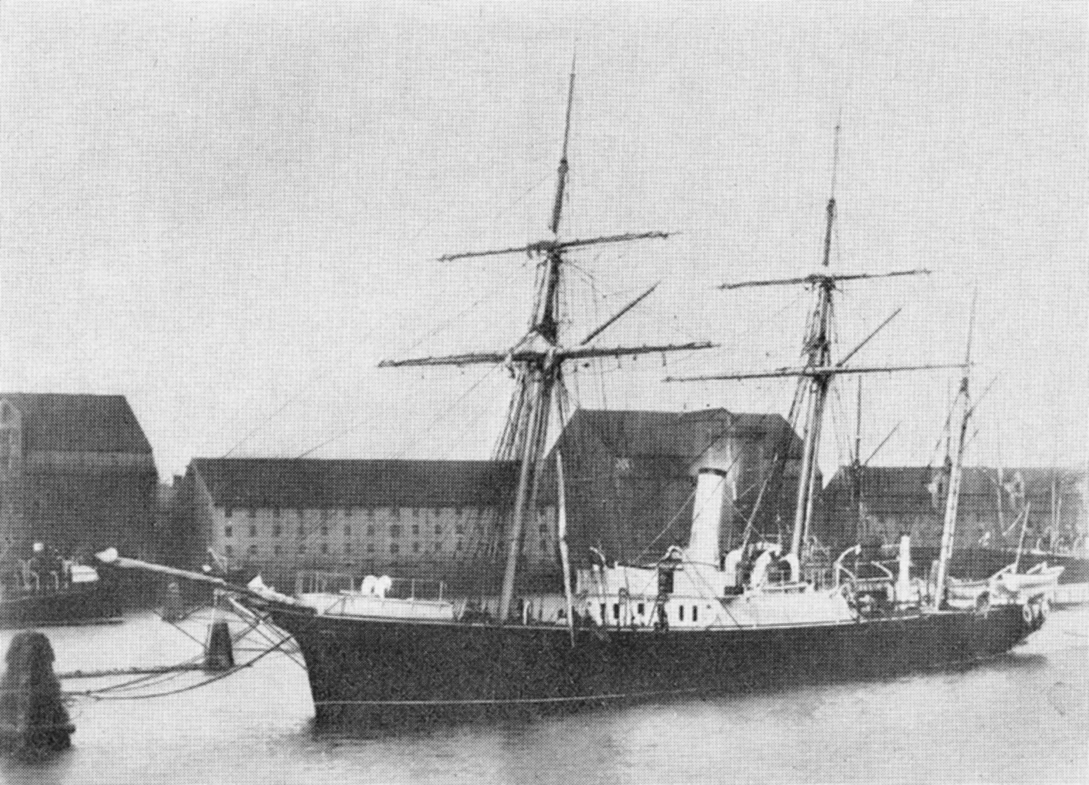
Schooner Fylla in Copenhagen harbour

Carl Hartvig Ryder (12 September 1858 – 3 May 1923) was a Danish naval officer and Arctic explorer.

== Biography ==
Carl Ryder was born in Copenhagen. He was the son of Frederik Valentiner Ryder (1821-1909) and his wife Henriette Sophie Cathrine Husmann (1836-1896). He entered a military career in the Royal Danish Navy becoming a Second Lieutenant in 1879 and Captain 1897.

He led an expedition to the Upernavik Distrikt in 1886-1887 and, most famously, the 1891-1892 expedition to East Greenland by the vessel Hekla. The way north from Ittoqqortoormiit was effectively blocked by ice. Instead, Ryder made the first comprehensive mapping of the entire Scoresby Sund fjord system, except for the inner part of Nordvestfjord.

He was a member of several other expeditions:

- The meteorological expedition 1882–83 to Nuuk led by Adam Paulsen
- The naturalist expedition to West Greenland with Eugenius Warming and Theo Holm in 1884 on the schooner Fylla
- J. A. D. Jensen's 1885 expedition

== Personal life ==
He married Ida Caroline Helene Clara Wolff (1864–1933) in 1888.

The Ryder Glacier in Greenland is named in his honour.

== Literature ==
- Spencer Apollonio, Lands That Hold One Spellbound: A Story of East Greenland, 2008

== See also ==
- Cartographic expeditions to Greenland
- List of Arctic expeditions
