= David Melgueiro =

Purported Portuguese explorer

David Melgueiro (before 1673) is purported to have been a Portuguese navigator and explorer who allegedly sailed from Japan to Portugal through the Northeast Passage in 1660, at a time when Portuguese vessels were banned from Japan. The story is considered to be a falsehood, with obvious factual errors in the account of the voyage and no historical evidence to support it or even confirm Melgueiro's existence.

== Alleged voyage ==
According to the story of a diplomat and French spy in Portugal, the Seigneur de La Madelène (or Madeleine), he had found records that a Captain David Melgueiro had left the island of Tanegashima, Japan (Kagoshima Prefecture) at the command of the ship Le Père Éternel on March 14, 1660, sailed north along the east coast of Asia to 84° N. The ship then sailed between Svalbard and Greenland towards Scotland and Ireland, passing west of them to finally arrive at Porto.

La Madelène was allegedly murdered when he was preparing to leave Portugal to reveal Melgueiro's achievement to the French. In 1754 the French geographer Philippe Buache traced in his memoirs the route taken by Melgueiro on a 1649 map drawn by a Portuguese identified only as Teixeira. The map was found in the French Navy archives. How the French Navy acquired this map would be a Portuguese state secret as well.

== Appraisal of veracity ==
William Corr dismisses the story by saying that "no Portuguese vessels sailed, or could have sailed, from Japan in 1660; Portuguese commerce with Japan ended drastically in 1639." The Portuguese were expelled and under the Sakoku isolationist policy all trade and contact with the outside world stopped except for very limited trade by the Dutch.

In his account of the expedition of the Vega, Adolf Erik Nordenskiöld mentions Melgueiro's alleged voyage briefly but dismisses it as obvious fiction, noting that the only detail found in the account—namely that the coast of Tartary extends to 84°N—is false. The northernmost point on the Eurasian coast is Cape Chelyuskin at 77°44'N. Including islands, the northernmost point of Eurasia is Cape Fligely at 81°50'N. The northernmost point of land on Earth is a matter of some dispute, but all contenders lie off the coast of Greenland at approximately 83°40'N.

Eduardo Brasão described the supposed voyage as a historical fantasy and noted that there is no historical evidence of the ship in question departing from Kagoshima on the alleged date nor of any Portuguese person bearing the name "David Melgueiro".

== Legacy ==
The Associação David Melgueiro, a Portuguese nautical scientific project adopted Melgueiro's name for their 2016-2017 scientific expedition, Marborealis.

== See also ==
- Vega Expedition by Adolf Erik Nordenskiöld, the first Arctic expedition to navigate through the Northeast Passage
