= Oscar Dickson =

Swedish magnate, bulk merchant, industrialist and philanthropist

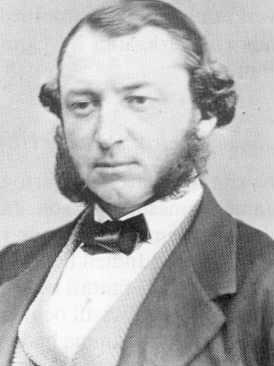
- Born: 2 December 1823; Gothenburg, Sweden
- Died: 6 June 1897 (aged 73); Almnäs Castle, Sweden

Baron Oscar Dickson, or Oskar Dickson (2 December 1823 – 6 June 1897) was a Swedish magnate, bulk merchant, industrialist and philanthropist from a family of Scottish origin. In his time he was considered the most affluent of all Swedes.

== Court cases ==
Dickson was a partner in a company that owned ships and sawmills. The Baggböle sawmill's business methods first came to a head when James Dickson Jr was taken to court in 1850. The accusation was that the sawmill had cut wood that belonged to the king. Dickson was fortunate to avoid prosecution. The saw mill business processed thousands of trees in the nineteenth century.

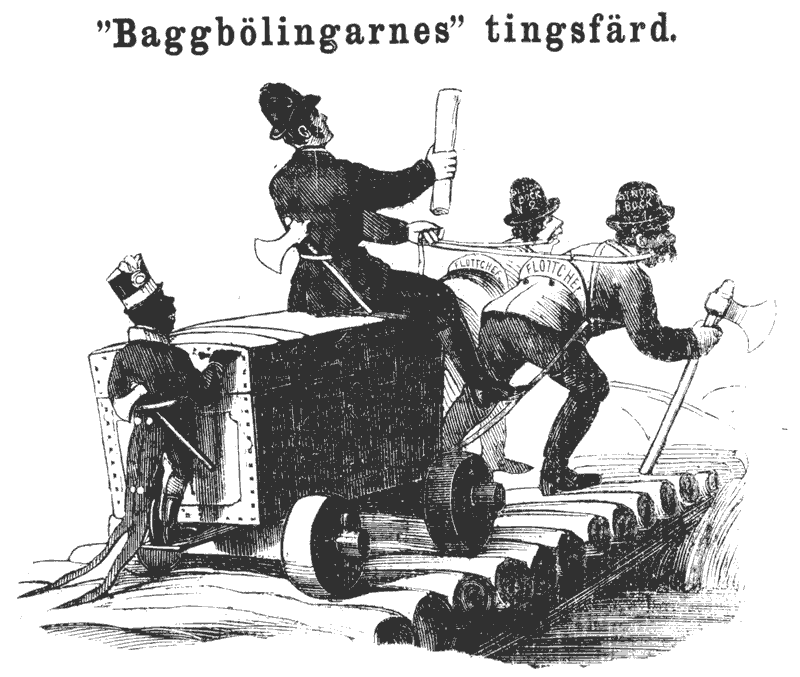
A satirical cartoon from 1867 features Oscar Dickson who was a manager at the time.

The exploitation of Crown timber could not continue and in 1866-7 the company was again taken to court and this time they were obliged to agree to help prevent the use of Crown timber. Oscar Dickson and the company were featured in satirical cartoons. This was the time when the new Swedish word "Baggböleri" was first seen in print which was a synonym for the exploitation of forests.

Dickson, along with King Oscar II of Sweden and Aleksandr Mikhaylovich Sibiryakov, was the patron of a number of Arctic expeditions in the 19th century. He sponsored Adolf Erik Nordenskiöld's explorations to the Canadian and the Russian Arctic and Greenland, as well as Fridtjof Nansen's Polar journey on the Fram.

Ever an Arctic enthusiast, Oscar Dickson contributed to sponsor several important Polar ventures between the years 1860 and 1900. Dickson was ennobled by King Oscar in 1880 and was raised to the status of Baron in 1885, the last person to be so in Sweden. Dickson was a member of the Royal Swedish Academy of Sciences from 1878.

== Honours ==
Dikson and Dikson Island in the Kara Sea were named after Oscar Dickson, as were Dicksonfjorden and Dickson Land on Svalbard.

== See also ==
- Vega expedition
- Dickson Glacier
