= Nordquist =

Nordquist or Nordqvist is a surname of Swedish origin meaning "northern branch". Notable people with the surname include:

== Nordquist ==
- Doug Nordquist (born 1958), American high jumper
- Helen Nordquist (1932–2023), American baseball player
- Hilda Lovisa Nordquist (1881–1935), Swedish missionary
- Jennifer Nordquist (born 1967), American official
- Jeremy Nordquist (born 1981), American politician from Nebraska
- Jonas Nordquist (born 1982), Swedish ice hockey player
- Mark Nordquist (born 1945), American football player

== Nordqvist ==
- Anna Nordqvist (born 1987), Swedish golfer
- Bertil Nordqvist, Swedish ski-orienteering competitor
- Björn Nordqvist (born 1942), Swedish football player
- Gustaf Nordqvist (1886–1949), Swedish composer
- Jens Nordqvist (born 1959), Swedish sprint canoer
- Kew Nordqvist (born 1950), Swedish politician
- Martin Nordqvist (born 2003), Swedish freestyle skier
- Oscar Frithiof Nordqvist (1858–1925), Finnish hydrographer
- Sven Nordqvist (born 1946), Swedish writer and illustrator of children's books

== See also ==
- Norquist
