= Dikson (urban-type settlement) =

Dikson Диксон
- Urban-type settlement
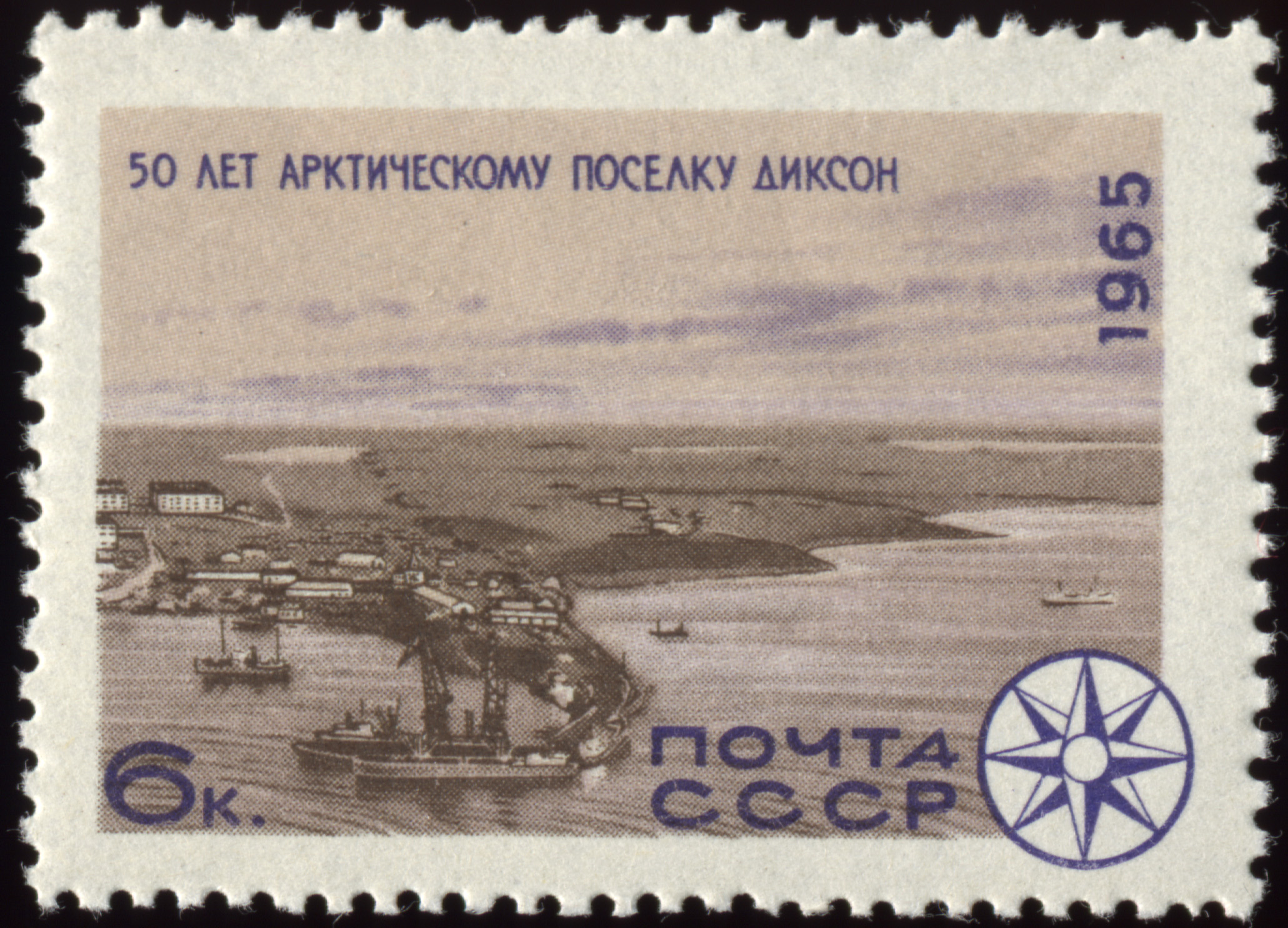
- Soviet stamp of 1965, dedicated to the fiftieth anniversary of the village of Dikson

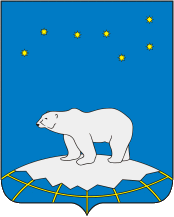
- Flag Coat of arms
- Interactive map of Dikson
- Location of Dikson Dikson (Krasnoyarsk Krai)
- Coordinates: 73°30′N 80°31′E
- Country: Russia
- Federal subject: Krasnoyarsk Krai
- Administrative district: Taymyrsky Dolgano-Nenetsky District
- Founded: 1915

Area
  - Total: 218,959 km^{2} (84,541 sq mi)
- Elevation: 26 m (85 ft)

Population (2010 Census)
  - Estimate (2024): 306 )
- Time zone: UTC+7 (MSK+4)
- Postal code: 647340
- Dialing code: +7 39152
- OKTMO ID: 04653155051
- Website: dikson-taimyr.ru

Dikson (Russian: Диксон, IPA: [dʲiksən]) (also spelled Dixon or Dickson) is a closed port town located in northern Russia and is one of the world's northernmost settlements. Dikson is an urban locality (an urban-type settlement) situated in Taymyrsky Dolgano-Nenetsky District of Krasnoyarsk Krai. It is situated on the Kara Sea, located on a headland at the mouth of the Yenisei Gulf (the Yenisei River estuary), on Russia's Arctic Ocean coast. As of the 2021 Census, its population was 319. It is the world's northernmost settlement on a continental mainland.

== Geography ==
Dikson is the northernmost port in Russia, the northernmost settlement on the Asian continent, and the northernmost settlement on a continental mainland. It is so far north that no civil twilight appears from 8 December to 5 January, but it has 24 hours of civil twilight from 18 April to 26 August. It is one of the world's most isolated settlements. Dikson's inhabitants informally call their settlement "Capital of the Arctic", taken from a popular Soviet song.

Dikson and Dikson Island were named after Swedish Arctic pioneer Baron Oscar Dickson. Dickson, along with Aleksandr Mikhaylovich Sibiryakov, was the patron of a number of early Arctic expeditions, including Adolf Erik Nordenskiöld's Russian Arctic explorations.

== Demographics ==
The population crashed following the breakup of the Soviet Union, like many other cities in the far north of Russia, as the perceived lack of economic prospects by many of the residents resulted in large-scale emigration from the region.

Historical population
Year	Pop.	±%
1959	3,470	—
1970	3,889	+12.1%
1979	4,045	+4.0%
1989	4,449	+10.0%
2002	1,198	−73.1%
2010	676	−43.6%
2021	319	−52.8%
Source: Censuses

== Climate ==
Dikson has a tundra climate (Köppen: ET) where arboreal vegetation is unknown. For a polar climate temperatures are relatively moderate, similar to coastal Antarctica. Its climate is semiarid (below 350 mm annual precipitation) but covered with ice and snow. Pitch precipitation is in dry form. Usually, in these climates in the warmest month, most of the days feature temperatures below 10 °C, however on some occasions the city can have fresh summers instead of cold, with temperatures between 15 and 18 °C. For most of the year, the temperatures are below freezing which results in long and rigorous winters.

Liquid precipitation is concentrated between late spring and early fall. Temperatures do not fall below −50 °C (as happens in much lower latitudes) due to marine moderation. The place is known for pronounced climate change, with the highest Arctic temperatures, correlated with permafrost and marine ice pack melting. It has experienced the fastest warming in recent decades.

Climate data for Dikson
Month	Jan	Feb	Mar	Apr	May	Jun	Jul	Aug	Sep	Oct	Nov	Dec	Year
Record high °C (°F)	−0.3 (31.5)	−0.6 (30.9)	−0.2 (31.6)	3.6 (38.5)	11.1 (52.0)	22.2 (72.0)	26.8 (80.2)	26.9 (80.4)	18.2 (64.8)	8.2 (46.8)	1.9 (35.4)	0.3 (32.5)	26.9 (80.4)
Mean daily maximum °C (°F)	−20.5 (−4.9)	−20.5 (−4.9)	−16.8 (1.8)	−11.5 (11.3)	−4.6 (23.7)	3.2 (37.8)	8.6 (47.5)	8.3 (46.9)	4.0 (39.2)	−4.3 (24.3)	−13.1 (8.4)	−18.6 (−1.5)	−7.1 (19.1)
Daily mean °C (°F)	−24.0 (−11.2)	−24.1 (−11.4)	−20.6 (−5.1)	−15.2 (4.6)	−7.0 (19.4)	1.1 (34.0)	5.7 (42.3)	6.0 (42.8)	2.4 (36.3)	−6.4 (20.5)	−16.4 (2.5)	−21.8 (−7.2)	−10.0 (14.0)
Mean daily minimum °C (°F)	−27.3 (−17.1)	−27.5 (−17.5)	−24.0 (−11.2)	−18.5 (−1.3)	−9.2 (15.4)	−0.5 (31.1)	3.6 (38.5)	4.2 (39.6)	1.0 (33.8)	−8.6 (16.5)	−19.6 (−3.3)	−24.9 (−12.8)	−12.6 (9.3)
Record low °C (°F)	−46.2 (−51.2)	−48.1 (−54.6)	−45.3 (−49.5)	−38.0 (−36.4)	−28.8 (−19.8)	−17.3 (0.9)	−3.4 (25.9)	−3.6 (25.5)	−12.0 (10.4)	−31.3 (−24.3)	−42.8 (−45.0)	−46.6 (−51.9)	−48.1 (−54.6)
Average precipitation mm (inches)	37.4 (1.47)	27.5 (1.08)	23.3 (0.92)	18.6 (0.73)	19.8 (0.78)	29.6 (1.17)	38.9 (1.53)	43.0 (1.69)	43.3 (1.70)	30.4 (1.20)	22.8 (0.90)	31.3 (1.23)	365.9 (14.4)
Average rainy days	0	0	0	1	2	13	20	21	17	5	0.2	0	79.2
Average snowy days	21	19	19	19	24	16	4	3	15	27	23	20	210
Average relative humidity (%)	84	83	84	84	87	90	89	89	88	87	86	84	86
Mean monthly sunshine hours	0.0	22.6	127.1	237.0	189.1	141.0	223.2	139.5	60.0	24.8	0.0	0.0	1,164.3
Source 1: Погода и Климат
Source 2: HKO

== See also ==
- Dikson Airport
