= Norquist =

Norquist is a surname. Notable people with the surname include:

- David Norquist (born 1966), American government official
- Gerry Norquist (born 1962), American golfer
- Grover Norquist (born 1956), president of anti-tax lobbying group Americans for Tax Reform
- John Norquist (born 1949), mayor of Milwaukee, Wisconsin from 1988 through 2003

== See also ==
- Nordquist (surname)
