= Cape Vega =

Headland of the Kara Sea in Russia

Cape Vega Мыс Вега
- Cape
- Map showing the location of Cape Vega

- Location within Russia
- Coordinates: 77°37′55″N 103°21′58″E
- Location: Krasnoyarsk Krai, Russia
- Water bodies: Kara Sea

Area
  - Total: Russian Far North

Cape Vega (Russian: Мыс Вега; Mys Vega) is a headland on the northern shore of the Taymyr Peninsula in the Kara Sea, Russian Federation. This cape is located at the northern tip of the peninsula, a little to the west of Cape Chelyuskin. Oscar Bay lies between both capes.

Administratively Cape Vega is part of the Taymyrsky Dolgano-Nenetsky District of Krasnoyarsk Krai. It was named after Adolf Erik Nordenskiöld's ship SS Vega in which he carried out his Vega Expedition.

This cape should not be confused with another headland named 'Cape Vega' in Taymyr Island.
