= SS Vega =

A number of steamships have carried the name Vega, including

- SS Vega (1872), Adolf Erik Nordenskiöld sailed in 1878 in Vega from Gothenburg along the coast of Siberia to Yokohama on his discovery of the Northeast Passage.
- SS Vega, launched in 1897 as Gambia and renamed in 1915, was sunk in 1916 by a U-Boat near Barcelona.
- SS Vega, a steamship, launched in 1897 at Flensburg as Nordland for the Danish company Nordsöen, Copenhagen. Vega struck a mine and sank on 20 December 1939
- SS Vega, launched in 1898 by Murdoch & Murray, Port Glasgow, was initially a Russian-flag passenger-cargo steamship, then became Tjaldur with the Danish line DFDS in 1904, and was then sold in 1939 to Panamanian-flag owners as Dora and was used by Zionist organizations to transport Jewish refugees from Nazi Germany to Mandatory Palestine in 1939. In June 1942 it was sold to Nazi Germany's Kriegsmarine, rebuilt in Naples, and used as a supply ship to North Africa until shelled and sunk in December 1942 off Tunis by the Royal Navy
- SS Vega (1913), a Swedish steamship chartered by the Red Cross during World War II.

== See also ==
- MV NYK Vega is a 103,000-ton container ship built for NYK Line in 2006
- MV Vega, is a 30,000-ton container ship which on 27 October 2010 rescued 98 fishermen who had abandoned their vessel, the Athena, after it caught fire in the Celtic Sea.
