= Vega Expedition =

First Arctic expedition to navigate through the Northeast Passage

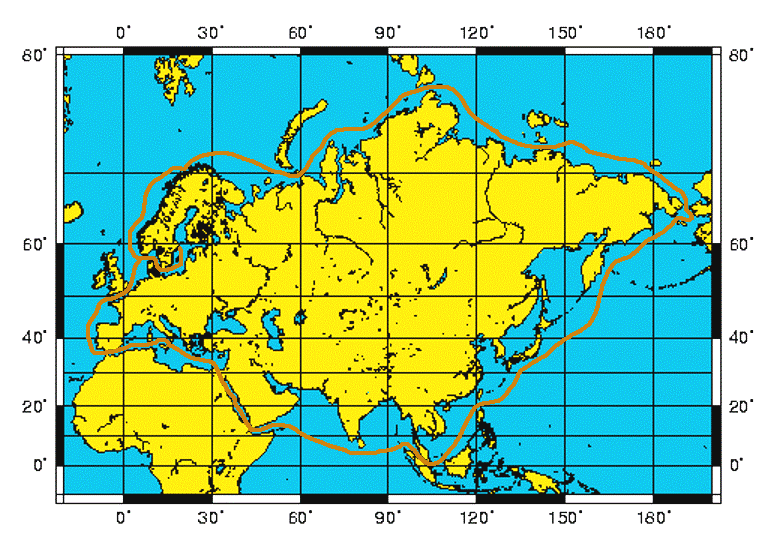
Map showing the route of the Vega expedition

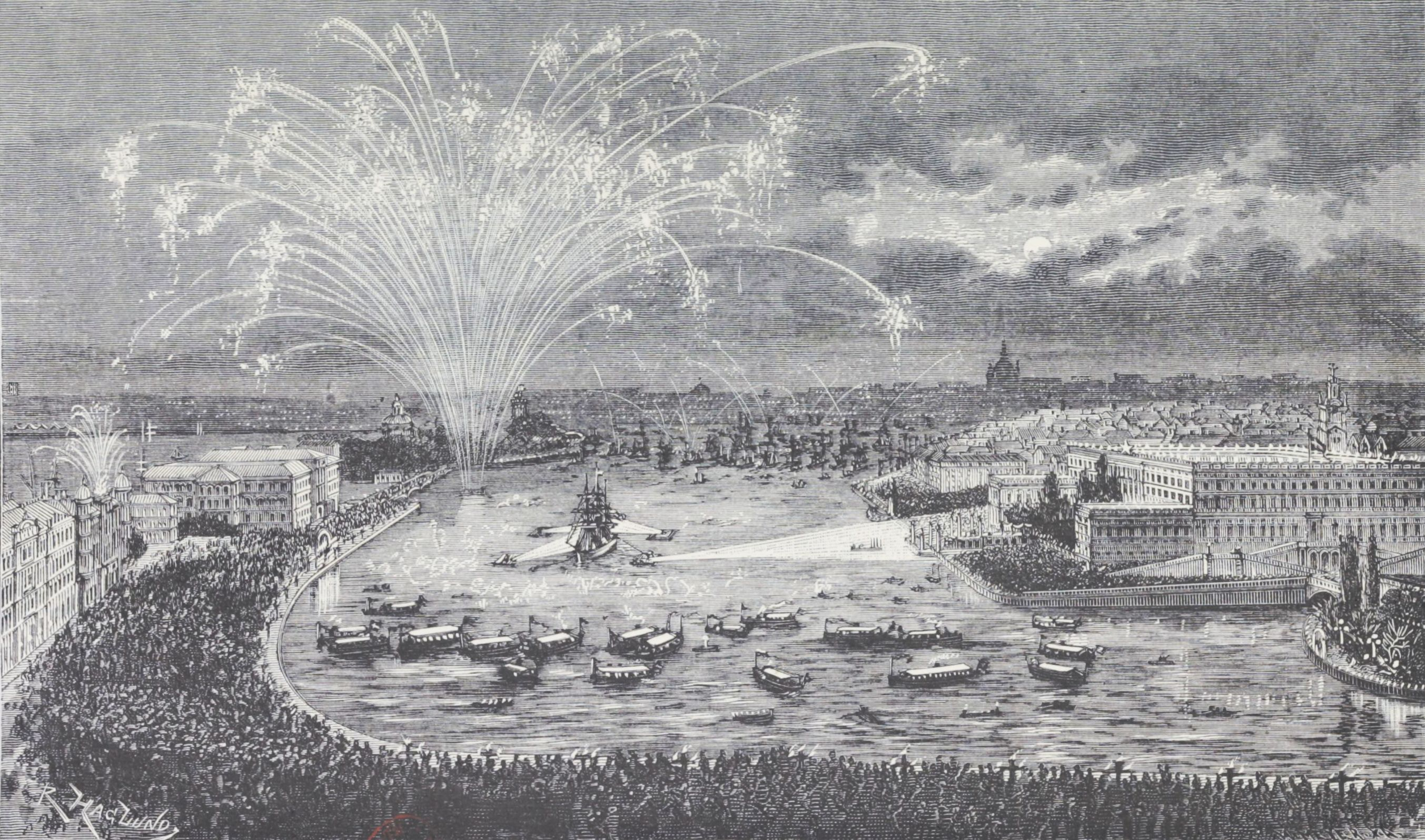
Return of explorer Adolf Erik Nordenskiöld with the SS Vega to Stockholm on 24 April 1880

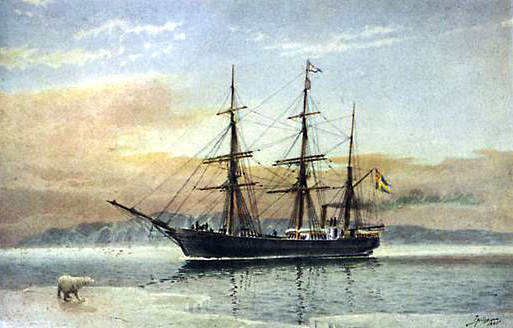
Swedish steamship SS Vega, used by Nordenskiöld during the expedition

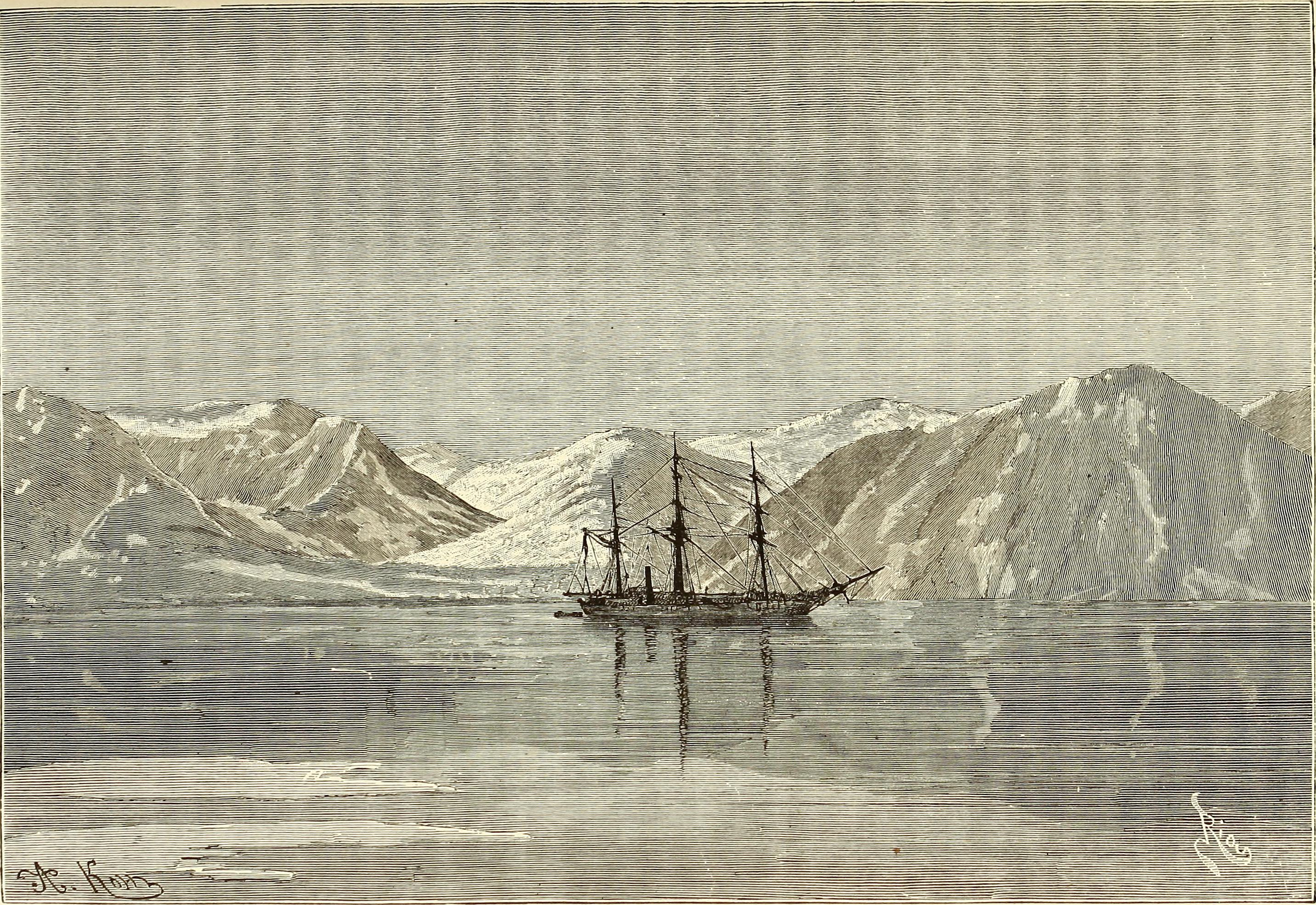
SS Vega at anchor in the Penkigney Bay of the Bering Sea

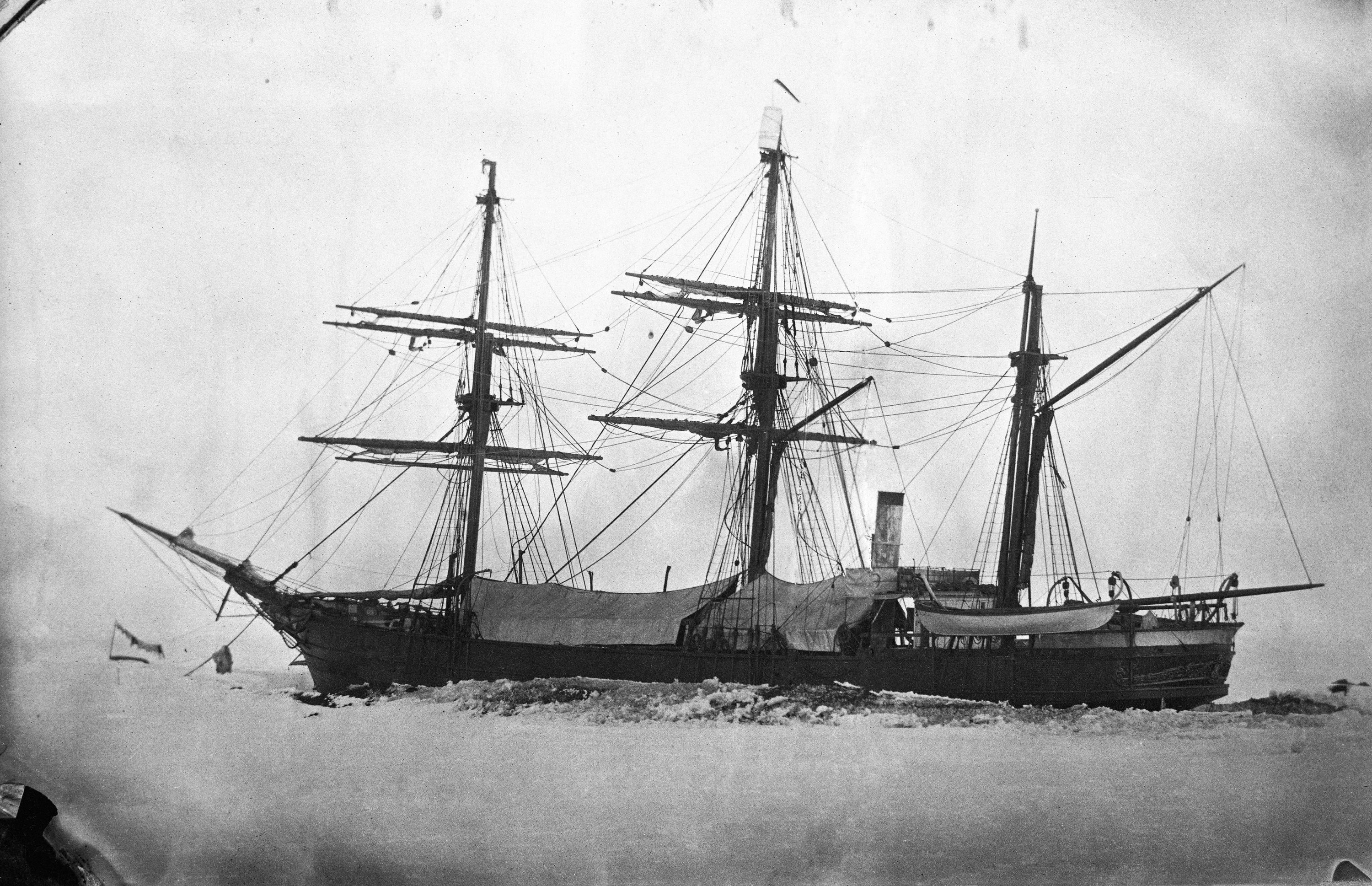
SS Vega frozen into packed ice outside Piltekai, Siberia. Photo by Louis Palander

The Vega Expedition (Swedish: Vegaexpeditionen) of 1878–1880, named after the SS Vega and under the leadership of Finland-Swedish explorer Adolf Erik Nordenskiöld, was the first Arctic expedition to navigate through the Northeast Passage, the sea route between Europe and Asia through the Arctic Ocean, and the first voyage to circumnavigate Eurasia. Initially a troubled enterprise, the successful expedition is considered to be among the highest achievements in the history of Swedish science.

== Preparations ==
Nordenskiöld had already conducted a series of expeditions in the Arctic, including to Svalbard, West Greenland, the Kara Sea and the Yenisei River.

In 1877, Nordenskiöld began planning the expedition to find the Northeast Passage, and in July he presented a detailed plan to King Oscar II, who accepted the proposal. Additional funds were provided by members of the Swedish Society for Anthropology and Geography and the Royal Society of Sciences and Letters in Gothenburg, and private individuals, notably Swedish industrialist and philanthropist Oscar Dickson (1823-1897) and Russian industrialist Alexander Sibiryakov (1849–1933).

The steamship Vega, constructed in 1872 at Bremerhaven as a sealer and whaler, was bought for the expedition, and was converted at the Karlskrona naval shipyards in Blekinge, Sweden, with government funding. Sibiryakov also equipped another steamship, Lena, which would accompany the expedition until the Lena River in Siberia.

== Expedition members ==
Louis Palander (1842–1920) was appointed captain of the expedition. Palander was a Swedish naval officer and an experienced sailor who had already made several trips in the Arctic and had previously participated in other Nordenskiöld expeditions. It also included scientists, officers and a crew of 21 men. Noted members of the international team included:

- Ernst Almquist, Swedish doctor, botanist and lichenologist
- Karl Johan Andersson, Swedish xylographer and painter
- Giacomo Bove, Italian sailing master, in charge of the Marine chronometers, made astronomical observations needed to fix the ship's position
- Andreas Peter Hovgaard, Danish naval officer, explorer and meteorologist, responsible for the meteorological and magnetic observations
- Frans Reinhold Kjellman, Swedish botanist
- Oscar Frithiof Nordquist, Finnish hydrographer and zoologist, acted as the Russian interpreter
- Anton Stuxberg, Swedish zoologist

== Expedition ==
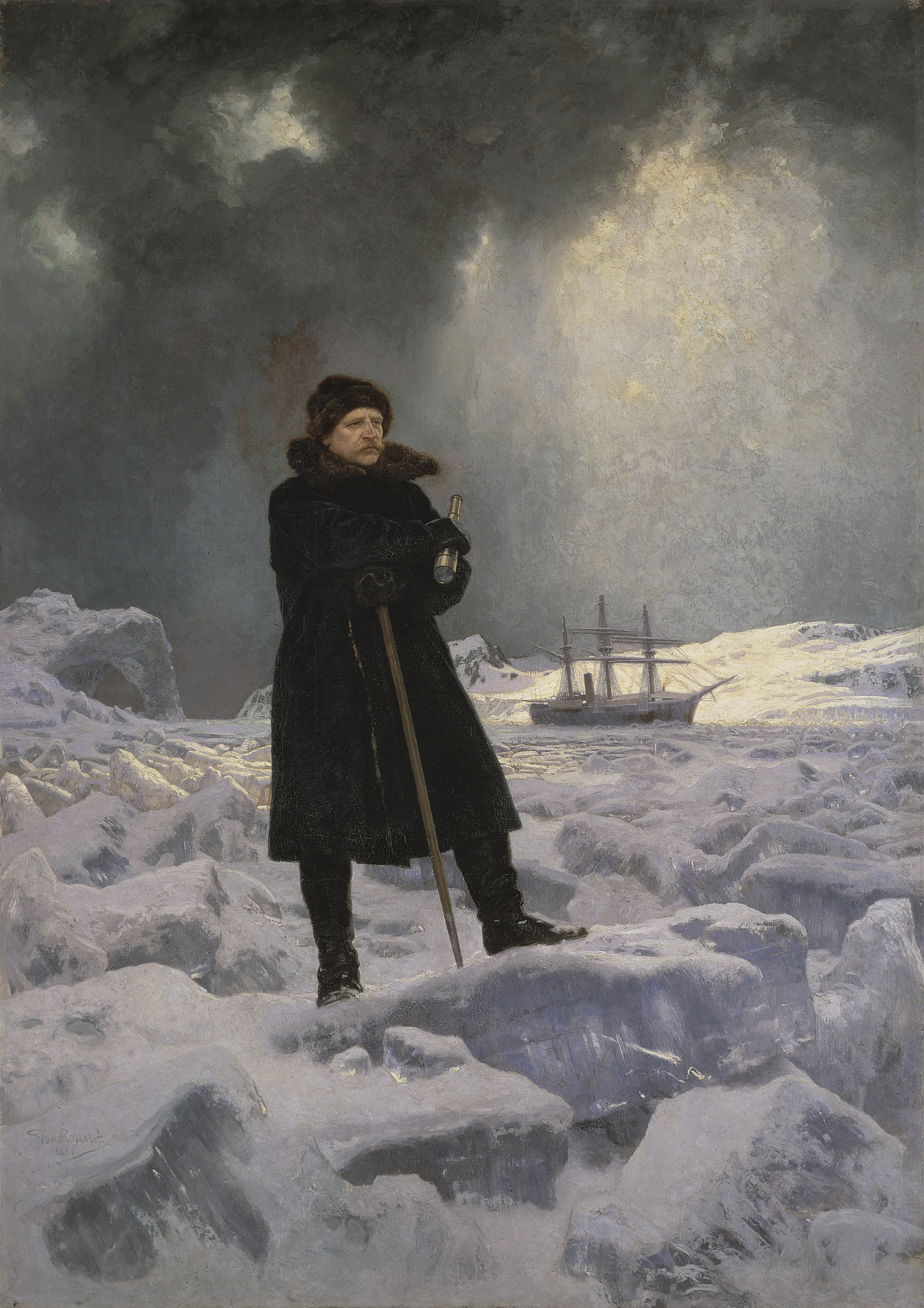
Adolf Erik Nordenskiöld with the Vega. Georg von Rosen (1886)

The purpose of the expedition was to collect scientific material from the Arctic and to circumnavigate Asia. The expedition had been approved by the Swedish king himself Oscar II in 1877 and was to be led by the Swedish-Finnish explorer Adolf Erik Nordenskiöld.

Vega left Karlskrona on 22 June 1878, making a stop in Tromsø from 17 until 21 July. In Tromsø, Vega was joined by the cargo ship Lena, commanded by Edvard Holm Johanssen. The ships reached Cape Chelyuskin, the northernmost tip of the Eurasian continent, on 19 August 1878. Lena navigated up the Lena river towards Yakutsk on 27 August, with Vega continuing east along the coast, which had only a narrow ice-free strip a couple of miles wide.

Vega's progress stopped in pack ice on 28 September 1878, about 1.5 kilometers from the coast at the Chukchi Peninsula at Neshkan, only days from the Bering Strait. As the Vega was traveling by the Chukchi peninsula which was inhabited by the local Chukchis, the temperature affected the engines making the ship stop in its tracks.

=== First contact with the Chukchi people ===
During the stop near the Pitlekaj settlement, three boats with an estimated 30 Chukchis approached the Vega while shouting. As the Chukchis began boarding the ship, the Swedes had to fire their rifles – presumably into the air – to restore order. The crew member Vega-Sven recounts the event:

"I dag på morgonen så kom där till oss 3 båtar med människor, de var vilda, de ville gå ombord men vi måtte ta oss ett gevär och skjuta innan vi kunde styra dän. Deras båtar var av sälhud, de var en 30 stycken människor, ludna, bruna fulingar."

However, the intent of the Chukchis was not malicious, and tensions shortly thereafter de-escalated. The Swedes would accept the Chukchis' offer of hospitality. As the winter progressed, the Swedes spent their time east of the Chukchis town of Pitlekaj in the bay of Koljutjinskaja, thus delaying the expedition by around a year. The relationship between the Swedes and the Chukchis improved, and they would celebrate birthdays and holidays with each other. The discovery of the Chukchis by the Swedes would greatly contribute to the knowledge and awareness about them, one crew member even learned the Chukchi language to such a degree that he managed to make a dictionary from Swedish to Chukchi.

=== Freed from the ice ===
The expedition spent the winter there. Vega could be freed from the ice only the next summer, on 18 August 1879, and it reached Bering Strait on 20 August. Vega stopped in Japan for repairs for almost two months, and returned to Sweden through the Indian Ocean and the Suez Canal. It returned to Stockholm on 24 April 1880, prompting festive celebrations with fireworks and almost the whole of Stockholm's inhabitants cheering and welcoming them home. Among the spectators was a then 15-year old Sven Hedin, who at that time decided to be an adventurer himself.

== See also ==
- Albatross expedition (1947–48), Swedish oceanographic expedition
- Cape Vega, a headland in the Kara Sea named after the ship
- Vega gull (Larus vegae), a species of gull discovered on the expedition and named after it
- History of research ships
- Capture of Manuel Briones
