= SS Vega (1872) =

First ship to circumnavigate Eurasia

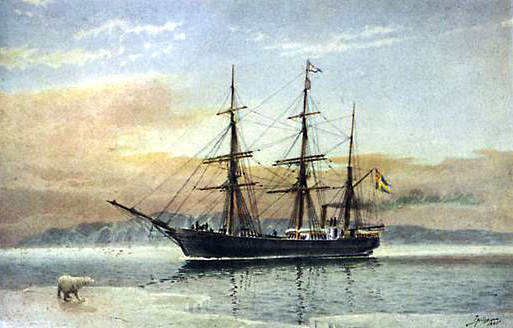
- The Vega, painting by Jacob Hägg

History
- Name: SS Vega
- Port of registry: Sweden
- Launched: 1872, in Bremerhaven
- Owner: Ferguson
- Port of registry: Dundee, United Kingdom
- Acquired: 1903
- Out of service: 1903
- Fate: Missing in Melville Bay, Greenland

General characteristics
- Class & type: Steamship
- Tonnage: 357 DWT
- Length: 150 ft.
- Propulsion: Sails, 70 hp auxiliary steam engine
- Sail plan: Barque

SS Vega was a Swedish barque, built in Bremerhaven, Germany in 1872. The Vega was the first ship to complete a voyage through the Northeast Passage, and the first vessel to circumnavigate the Eurasian continent, during the Vega expedition. Initially a troubled enterprise, the successful expedition is considered to be among the highest achievements in the history of Swedish science.

== Construction ==
Though a sailing ship, the Vega had a 60 hp auxiliary steam engine. The hull was of wood measuring 150 ft. in length (45.72 m), a capacity of 357 DWT.

== Arctic exploration ==
Constructed as a whaler, the vessel was acquired and rebuilt for Arctic exploration by Nils Adolf Erik Nordenskiöld with financial assistance from King Oscar II of Sweden and others. On 22 June 1878 the ship set out from Karlskrona, Sweden through the Northeast Passage around the north coast of Eurasia. Blocked by ice on 28 September of that year only 120 miles (200 km) short of the Bering Strait marking the eastern end of Asia, the ship was not freed until 18 July 1879. Two days later East Cape was passed, and Vega became the first ship to complete a voyage through the Northeast Passage. Returning by way of the Western Pacific, Indian Ocean, and Suez Canal, Vega also became the first vessel to circumnavigate the Eurasian continent.

== Whaling and sealing ==
After the expedition Vega returned to her original trades of whaling and seal hunting. The ship was reported sunk in Melville Bay west of Greenland in 1903, sailing under the British owner Ferguson of Dundee.

== Images ==
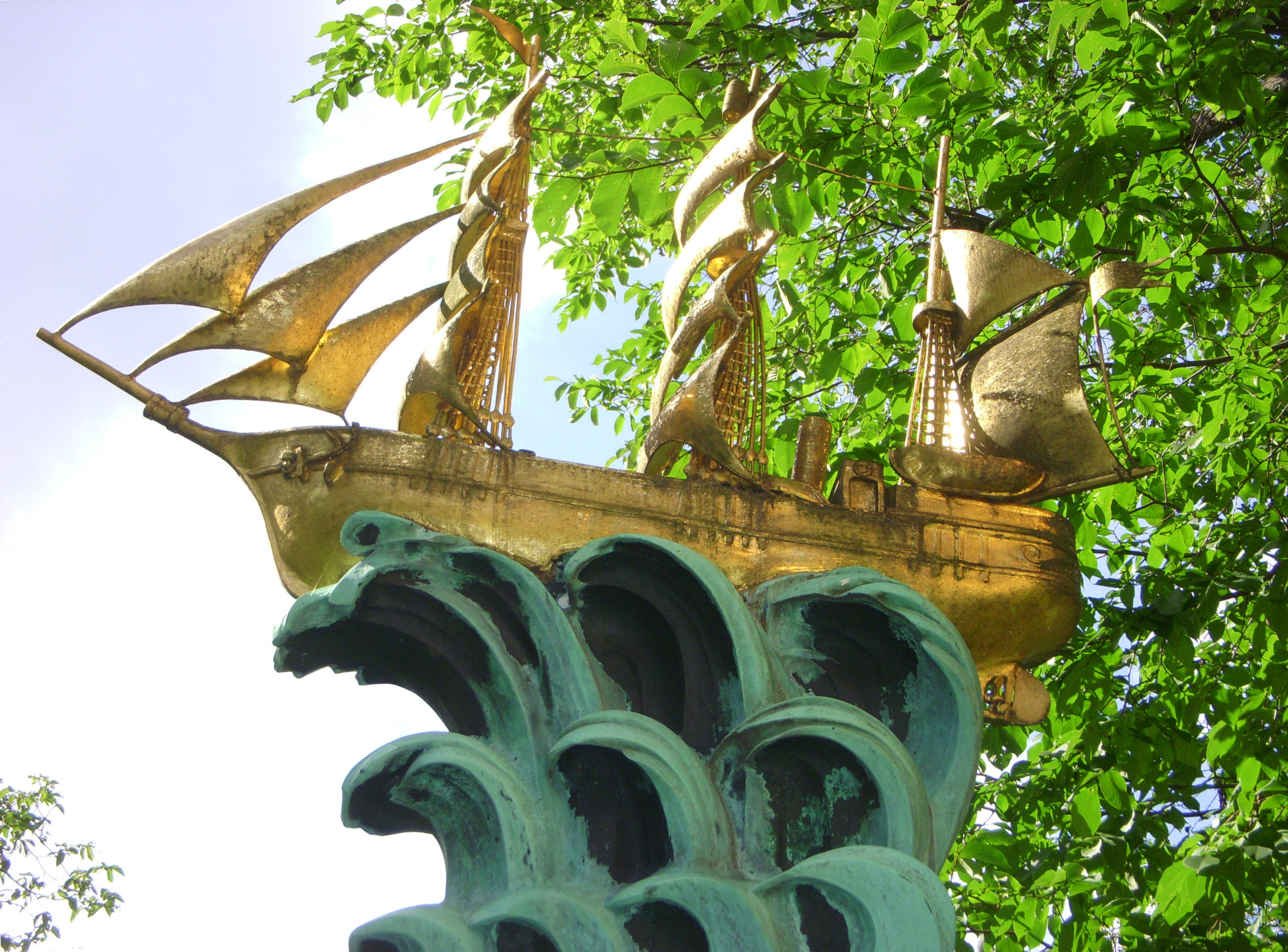
Vega monument in Stockholm

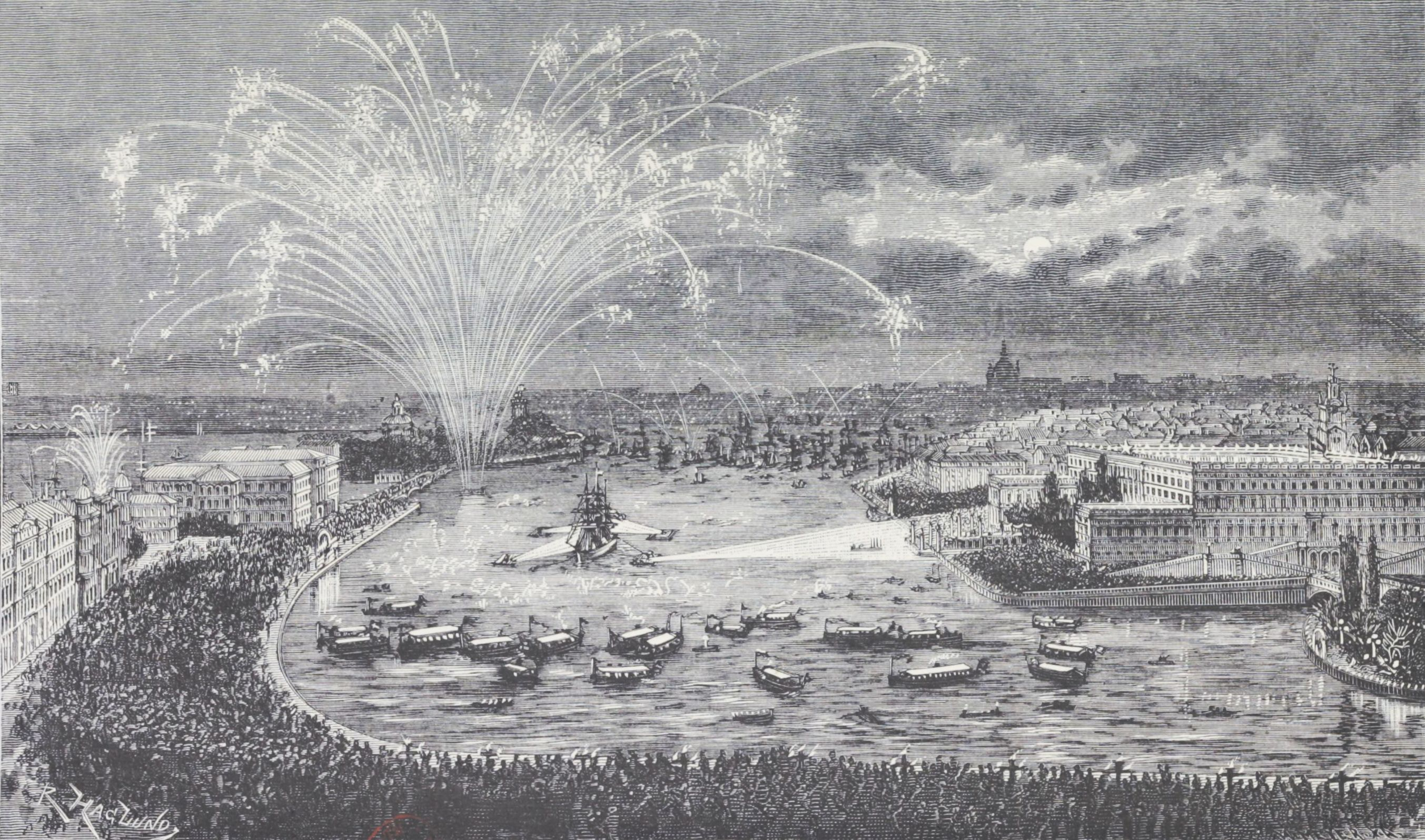
Return of Adolf Erik Nordenskiöld with the Vega to Stockholm on April 24, 1880

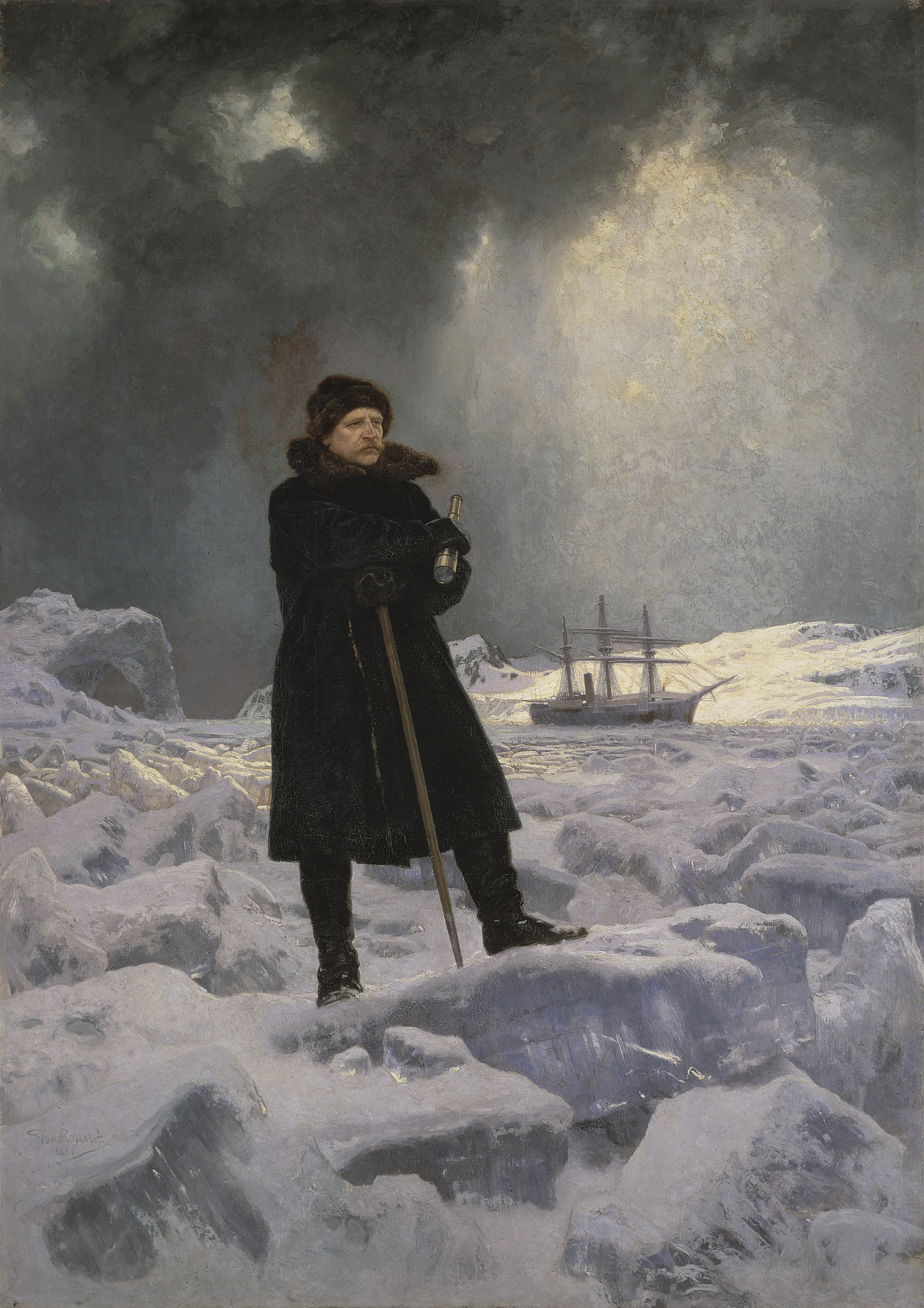
Nils Adolf Erik Nordenskiöld with the Vega, by Georg von Rosen

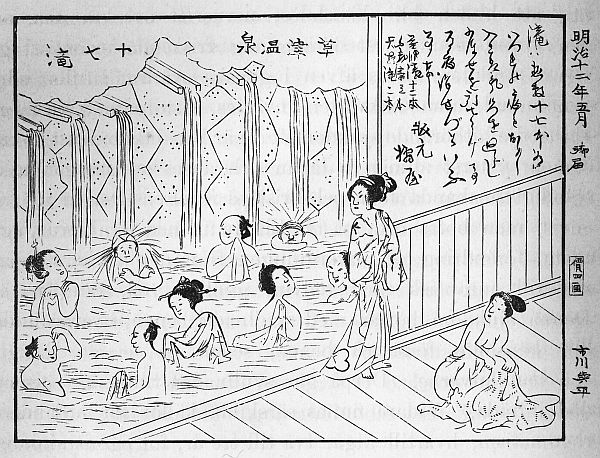
Bath in Kusatsu i by Vega expedition member Olof Sörling during S/S Vega's stay in Japan September–November 1879

== See also ==
- Gjøa, the first vessel to transit the Northwest Passage
- Oscar Frithiof Nordquist, Finnish member of the expedition
- Cape Vega and Vegafonna, named after this ship
- Vega gull (Larus vegae) discovered on the Northeast Passage voyage and named after the ship
