= Dikson Island =

Island off the coast of Krasnoyarsk Krai, Russia

Dikson
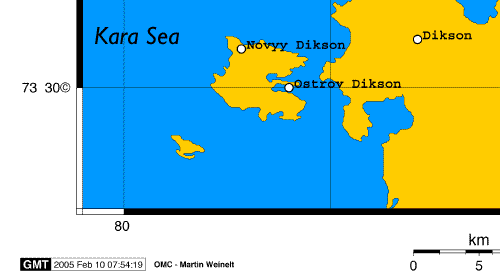
- Location of Dikson at the mouth of the Yenisei

- Location within Krasnoyarsk Krai

Geography
- Coordinates: 73°30′25″N 80°32′47″E

Administration
- Russia
- Krai: Krasnoyarsk Krai

Demographics
- Population: 1100

Dikson Island (Russian: Ди́ксон), initially Dickson, is an island in Taymyrsky Dolgano-Nenetsky District, Krasnoyarsk Krai, Russia, situated in the Kara Sea near the mouth of the Yenisei River. A nearby urban-type settlement of Dikson, which functions as a port and hydrometeorological centre, is located on the mainland across from the island. It is served by the Dikson Airport.

== History ==
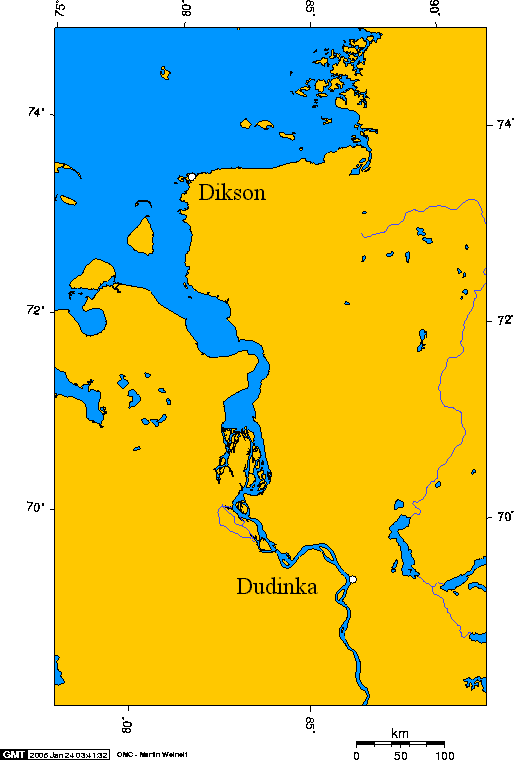
Dikson and Dudinka

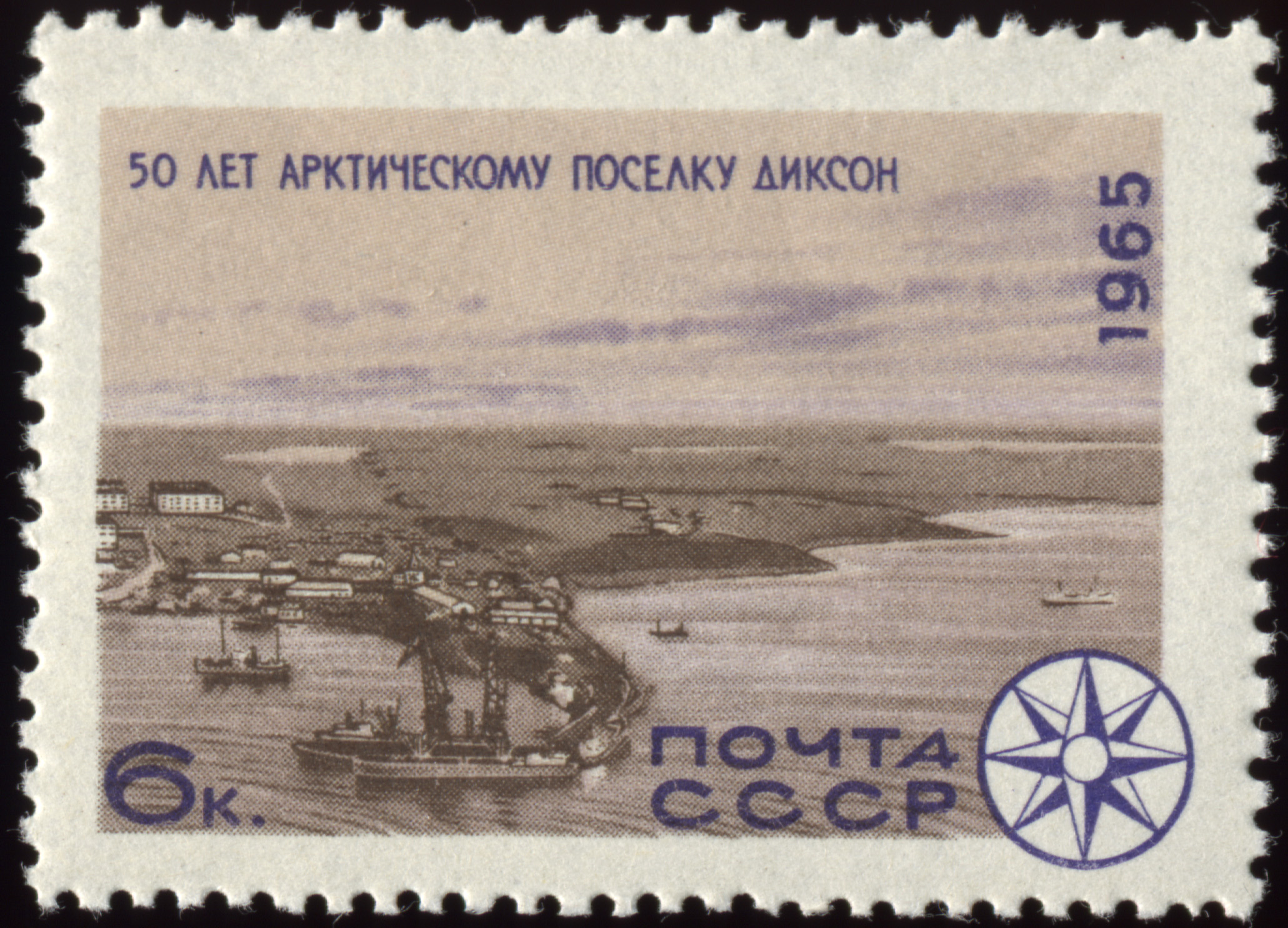
Fiftieth anniversary of the urban-type settlement of Dikson. USSR stamp, 1965

Dikson Island and its adjoining urban settlement have been named after Swedish Arctic pioneer Baron Oscar Dickson. In the 17th century the island was known as Dolgy ("long") island, or Kuzkin, after its Pomor discoverer. In 1875, the Finnish explorer Adolf Erik Nordenskiöld renamed it after the wealthy Swedish merchant and philanthropist of Scottish origin Oskar Dickson. The name was soon Russified, by dropping the "c". Dikson has been the official name of the island since 1884. Oscar Dickson, along with Aleksandr Mikhaylovich Sibiryakov, had been the patron of a number of early Arctic expeditions, including Adolf Erik Nordenskiöld's Russian Arctic explorations.

In 1915 the island became the site of the first Russian radio station in the Arctic. The seaport on the mainland was built in 1935, and in 1957 the two settlements were merged into one.

During World War II the town was bombarded by the German pocket battleship Admiral Scheer in August 1942 during Operation Wunderland.

Dikson Island was one of the transfer destinations for 1949 March deportation from Latvia.

== Climate ==
Dikson has an arctic tundra climate (Köppen climate classification ET) — yet interestingly, it has four almost equally-divided "seasons": The sun does not rise from about mid-November through early February, and does not set from the beginning of May until mid-August. In between, there is a "spring" during which the amount of daylight steadily increases, and an "autumn" during which the amount of daylight steadily decreases — but due to the "seasonal lag" factor, February is actually the coldest month, while August is the warmest month.

Climate data for Ostrov Dikson
Month	Jan	Feb	Mar	Apr	May	Jun	Jul	Aug	Sep	Oct	Nov	Dec	Year
Record high °C (°F)	−0.3 (31.5)	−0.6 (30.9)	0.1 (32.2)	3.6 (38.5)	11.1 (52.0)	22.2 (72.0)	26.8 (80.2)	26.9 (80.4)	18.2 (64.8)	8.2 (46.8)	1.9 (35.4)	0.3 (32.5)	26.9 (80.4)
Mean daily maximum °C (°F)	−20.5 (−4.9)	−20.5 (−4.9)	−16.8 (1.8)	−11.5 (11.3)	−4.6 (23.7)	3.2 (37.8)	8.6 (47.5)	8.3 (46.9)	4.0 (39.2)	−4.3 (24.3)	−13.1 (8.4)	−18.6 (−1.5)	−7.1 (19.1)
Daily mean °C (°F)	−24.0 (−11.2)	−24.1 (−11.4)	−20.6 (−5.1)	−15.2 (4.6)	−7.0 (19.4)	1.1 (34.0)	5.7 (42.3)	6.0 (42.8)	2.4 (36.3)	−6.4 (20.5)	−16.4 (2.5)	−21.8 (−7.2)	−10.0 (14.0)
Mean daily minimum °C (°F)	−27.3 (−17.1)	−27.5 (−17.5)	−24.0 (−11.2)	−18.5 (−1.3)	−9.2 (15.4)	−0.5 (31.1)	3.6 (38.5)	4.2 (39.6)	1.0 (33.8)	−8.6 (16.5)	−19.6 (−3.3)	−24.9 (−12.8)	−12.6 (9.3)
Record low °C (°F)	−46.2 (−51.2)	−48.1 (−54.6)	−45.3 (−49.5)	−38.0 (−36.4)	−28.8 (−19.8)	−17.3 (0.9)	−3.4 (25.9)	−3.6 (25.5)	−12.0 (10.4)	−31.3 (−24.3)	−42.8 (−45.0)	−46.6 (−51.9)	−48.1 (−54.6)
Average precipitation mm (inches)	27.8 (1.09)	27.7 (1.09)	26.2 (1.03)	21.9 (0.86)	24.0 (0.94)	26.9 (1.06)	32.6 (1.28)	39.9 (1.57)	42.7 (1.68)	38.0 (1.50)	28.5 (1.12)	28.5 (1.12)	364.7 (14.34)
Average rainy days	0	0	0	1	2	13	19	21	17	5	0.2	0	78
Average snowy days	21	19	19	19	24	16	4	3	15	27	22	20	209
Average relative humidity (%)	83	83	84	84	87	90	89	90	88	87	86	83	86
Mean monthly sunshine hours	0.0	24.0	128.0	238.0	188.0	140.0	224.0	138.0	61.0	27.0	2.0	0.0	1,170
Source 1: Pogoda.ru.net
Source 2: NOAA (sun only, 1961-1990)

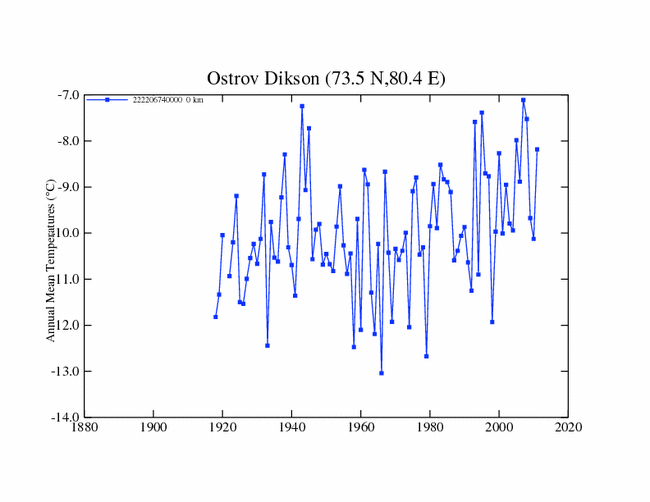
Climate graph of 1918-2012 air average temperatures at Dikson

== See also ==
- List of islands of Russia

== External sources ==
- Location
- Edwards, Rob (September 9, 1995). Northern exposure. New Scientist. (subscription required)
- William Barr, The Last Journey of Peter Tessem and Paul Knutsen, 1919.
- Picture
- Russian-Soviet polar stations and their role in the Arctic Seas exploration
