= Emigration of Jews from Nazi Germany and German-occupied Europe =

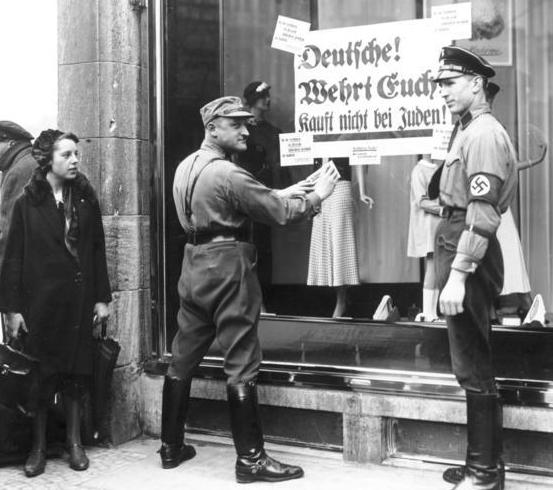
Members of the Sturmabteilung installing a sign on the front window of a Jewish-owned store in Berlin on 1 April 1933, as part of the Nazi boycott of Jewish businesses, which the Nazi Party claimed was in response to the 1933 anti-Nazi boycott. The sign reads: "Germans! Defend yourselves, do not buy from the Jews!"

Between 1933 and 1945, a large number of Jews emigrated from Nazi Germany and German-occupied Europe. This exodus was triggered by the militaristic antisemitism perpetrated by the Nazi Party and by Germany's collaborators, ultimately culminating in the Holocaust. However, even before the genocide itself, which began during World War II, the Nazis had widely sponsored or enforced discriminatory practices—by legislation, in many cases—against Jewish residents, such as through the Nazi boycott of Jewish-owned businesses. Although Adolf Hitler and the German government were initially accepting of voluntary Jewish emigration from the country, it became difficult to find new host countries, particularly as the 1930s were marked by the Great Depression, as the number of Jewish migrants increased. Eventually, the Nazis forbade emigration; the Jews who remained in Germany or in German-occupied territory by this point were either murdered in the ghettos or relocated to be systematically exploited and murdered at dedicated concentration camps and extermination camps throughout the European continent.

== Mainland Germany and German-annexed Austria ==
=== Before World War II ===
In 1933, Hitler and the Jewish League agreed to the Haavara Agreement in which, over time, German Jews and their finances could and would settle in Mandatory Palestine. Furthermore, the Havaara Mark was used instead of the Reichsmark, because of its lower interest rates, and it was seen as more favourable. By the end of the 30‘s, over 60000 German Jews had emigrated to Palestine. Following this, they discouraged emigration by restricting the amount of money Jews could take from German banks and imposed high emigrations taxes. The German government forbade emigration from the Greater Germanic Reich after October 1941. The German Jews who remained, about 163000 in Germany and less than 57000 from annexed Austria, were mostly elderly who were murdered in ghettos or taken to Nazi concentration camps, where most were murdered. Jews were able to leave Vichy France until the fall of 1942.

Although Jews could initially leave Nazi Germany with ease, it was difficult to find countries that would take them, particularly after the initial wave of immigrants in Europe, Britain, and the United States had been accepted. One of the reasons that emigration was so difficult was that it began during the Great Depression.

=== During World War II ===
...we all wanted to get rid of our Jews but that the difficulties lay in the fact that no country wished to receive them.

— German Foreign Minister Joachim von Ribbentrop in a conversation to Adolf Hitler.

Following the Anschluss, the annexation of Austria to Germany in 1938, and forced emigration deepened the refugee crisis, the Évian Conference was held in France to explore options for countries to emigrate to, but the key outcome of the conference was that it proved that forced emigration would not solve the problem. Another was a concern that there might be pro-Nazi spies among the refugees.

It was also difficult to get out of Europe. After the war started, there were few ships that left European ports. Lisbon was a neutral port, however, from which refugees could still travel.

At the time that Hitler came to power in Germany in 1933, there were about 523000 German Jews (<1 percent of the population) in the country. Subject to threats and persecution, Jews began to emigrate from that point until the start of World War II. In Austria, more than 50% of the Jews had left the country by May 1939, following Adolf Eichmann's program to force Jews to emigrate that began in the spring of 1938. Franz Mayer, a Jewish leader, said of Eichmann's system: "You put in a Jew at one end, with property, a shop, a bank account, and legal rights. He passed through the building and came out at the other end without property, without privileges, without rights, with nothing except a passport and order to leave the country within a fortnight; otherwise, he would find himself inside a concentration camp." By the end of 1939, there were more than 117,000 Jews who left Austria and more than 300,000 who left Germany. Most of them were trained in a particular field or college-educated. Generally, they were young in age.

Many of the 100000 people who found refuge in neighbouring European countries, like the Netherlands, Belgium, and France, were captured and murdered by the Nazis, after May 1940, when they invaded western Europe. As the Nazi regime occupied Czechoslovakia, beginning in 1938, and invaded Poland in 1939, there were more Jewish refugees.

== German-occupied territories ==
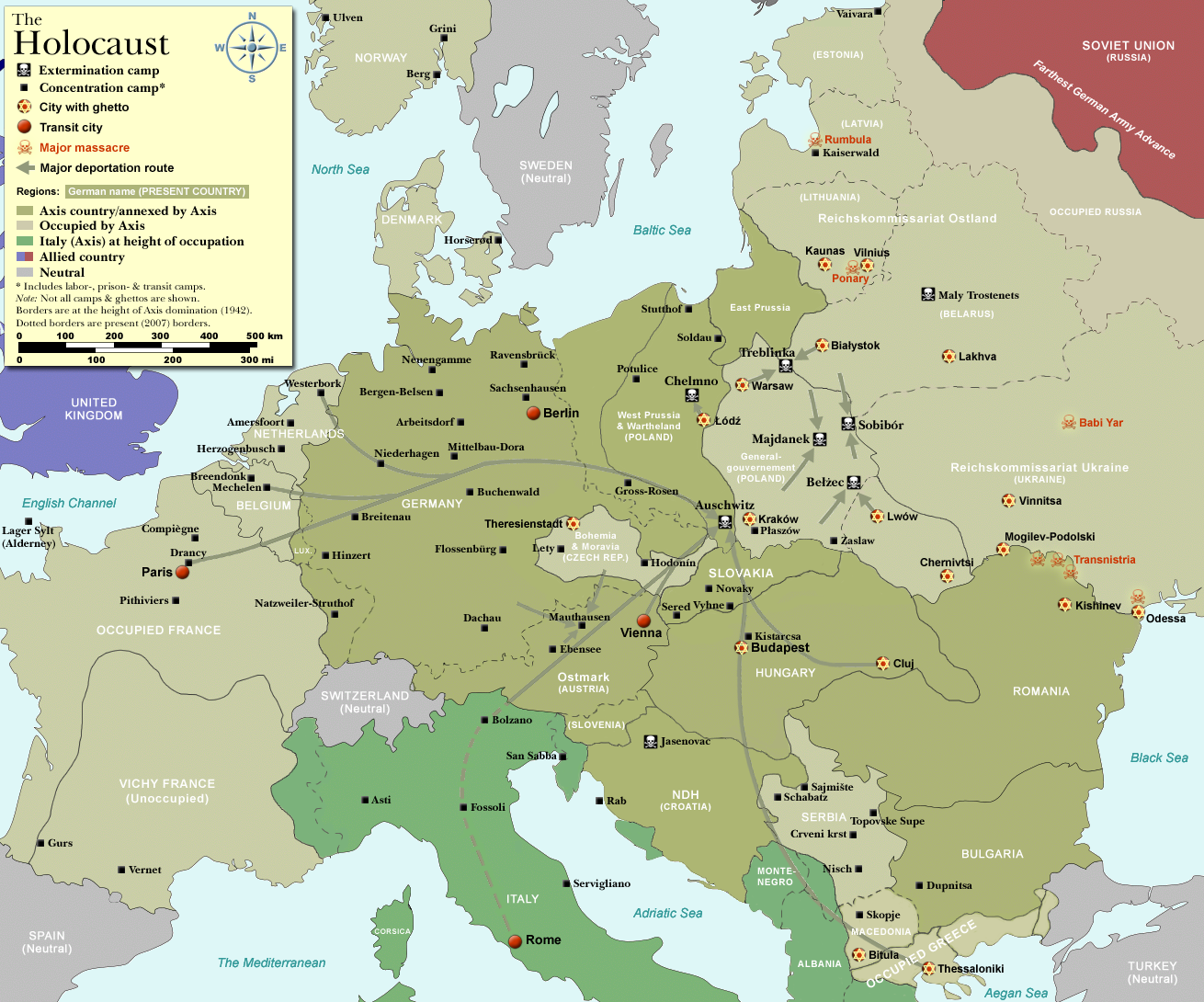
Europe, indicating Nazi and Axis occupation during the Holocaust

=== Denmark ===
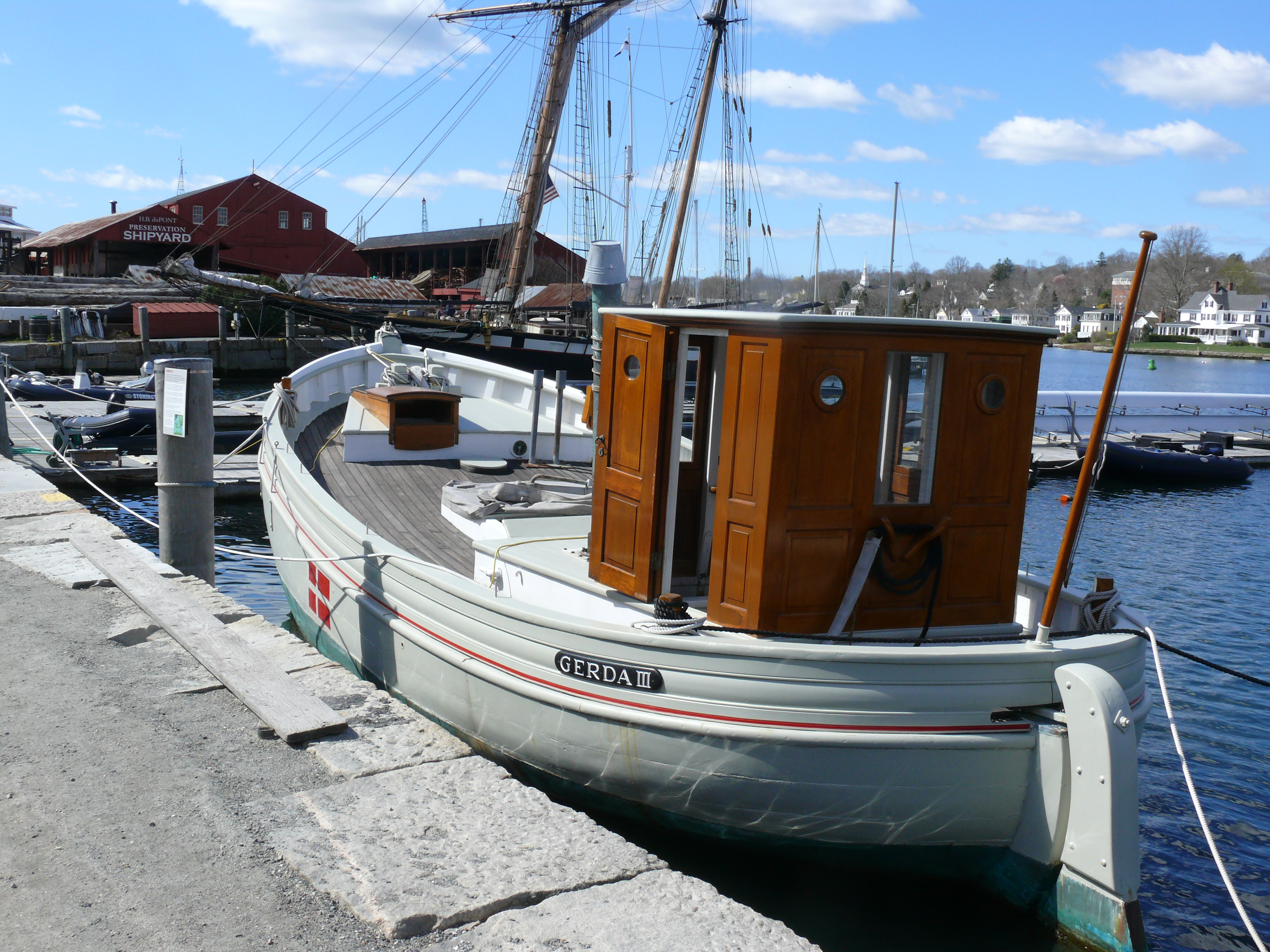
From October 1943, Gerda II was used to ferry Jewish refugees from German occupied Denmark to neutral Sweden. It ferried some 300 Jews to safety

In October 1943, 7000 Danish Jews, and 700 of their relatives who were not Jewish, escaped Nazi-occupied Denmark for neutral Sweden, as was coordinated by the Danish resistance movement. They travelled to Malmö, Sweden across the Øresund Channel.

=== France, Luxembourg, Belgium, the Netherlands ===
Many of the French, Luxembourgish, Belgian, and Dutch Jews were protected by their Country's resistances, hid in secret locations that were hard to find for the Nazis, and fled to the United Kingdom, Free France (Algeria), Sweden, Switzerland, Spain, Portugal, Canada, and the United States.

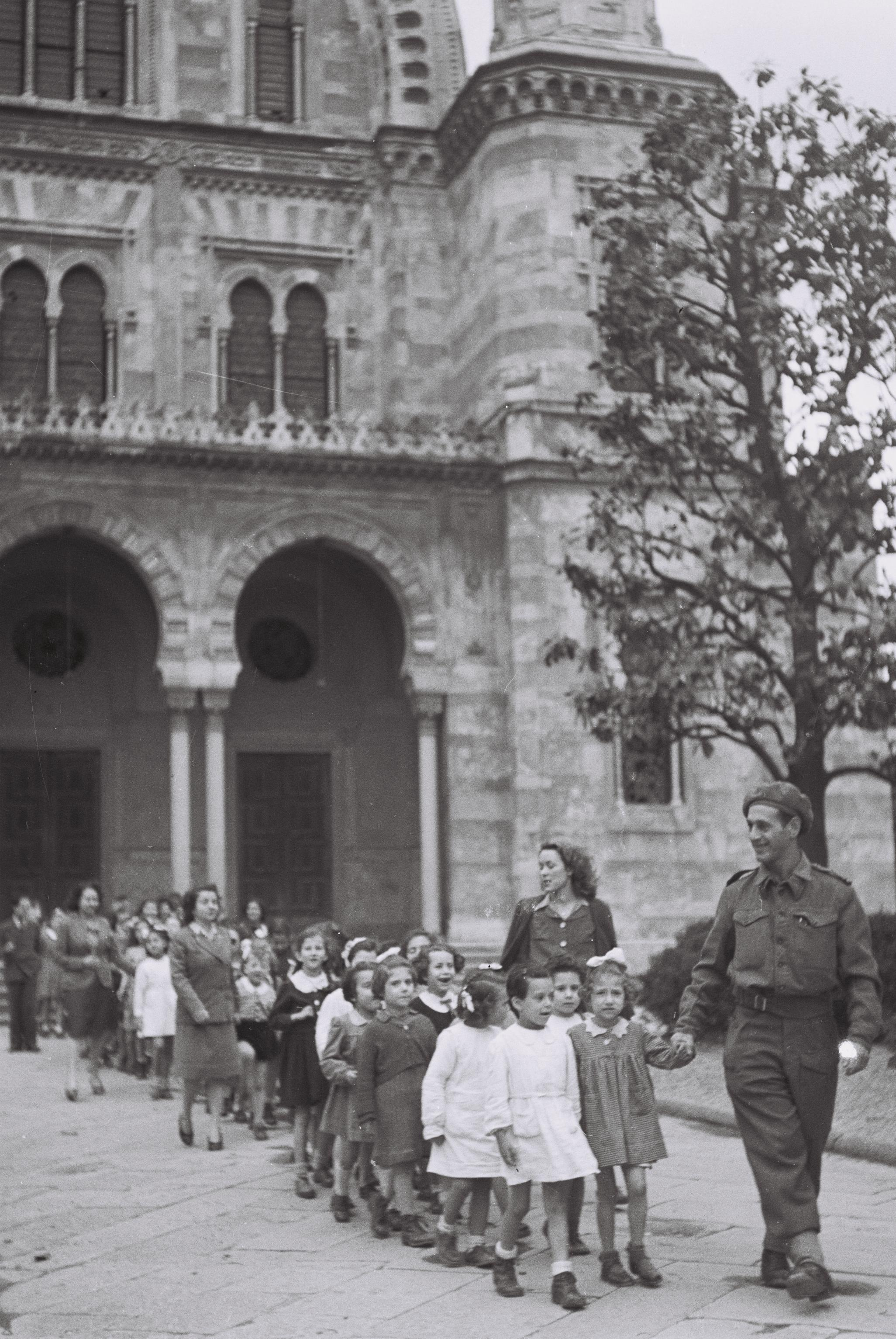
1944 A Jewish Brigade soldier and nurses of the Jewish Agency taking care of Jewish refugee children in Florence, Italy

=== Norway ===
After the German occupation of Norway in 1940, some Norwegian Jews were able to find a safe haven in Sweden, which was neutral. However, over half of the Norwegian Jews were rounded up by Quisling regime police and handed over to the Reichskommissariat Norwegen.

=== Poland ===
Jews were prevented from leaving German-occupied Poland by the Schutzstaffel (SS). About 10% of the Polish Jewish population, together with 1 million Poles in total, were rounded up by the Russians and sent to Siberia in intolerable circumstances. Many died from harsh treatment at the hands of the Russians from 1939 and 1943 and onwards. Other Jews were spared harsh treatment, however, and some were trained in Moscow, so as to be fit to command a new Polish government after the war was over. Some of them were sent to remote areas of the Soviet Union, Siberia, or Central Asia.

=== Soviet Union ===
In June 1941 Germany invaded the Soviet Union and began the systematic extermination of Jews as part of Hitler's Final Solution plan, beginning with their removal to extermination camps. During The Holocaust in the Soviet Union, Jews who were unable to flee to the Asian parts of the country were methodically shot. By the end of the war, 67 percent of the Jews from Europe had been murdered.

== Destinations of Jewish refugees ==
=== Within Europe ===
Between 1933 and 1943, European countries received substantial numbers of Jewish refugees. According to one estimate, England accepted about 65,000, France 55,000, the Netherlands 35,000, Belgium 30,000, Switzerland 16,000 and Spain 12,000, while other European countries collectively accepted about 70,000.

Despite pressure from Germany, Fascist Italy protected Jewish people in lands that it occupied in Greece, France, Dalmatia, Croatia, and Yugoslavia, as well as protecting Jews in Tunisia, between mid-1942 and September 1943.

About 30000 Jews entered Portugal through Spain, and many sought passage in Lisbon on ships bound for the Americas. The refugees were assisted by French and American Jewish organizations. Most travelled between 1939 and 1941, and after Germans pressured the country to limit Jews ability to travel through their country, from 1942 to 1944 there were about 7,500 people who were admitted entry to Spain for Portugal. Spanish consuls also provided identity papers so that up to 5000 people could escape through other parts of Europe.

Sweden took in Jews from Norway and Denmark. The Swiss took in nearly 30000 Jews, yet also turned away 20000 at their border.

=== Outside of Europe ===
==== Dominican Republic ====
In July 1938, the Dominican Republic was the only country at the Évian Conference that said it would admit a large number of refugees. President Rafael Trujillo did this partially to deflect international criticism of mass killings of Haitian refugees in the Parsley massacre.

==== Bolivia ====
Between 1938 and 1941, Bolivia allowed for 30000 refugees to immigrate to its country.

==== Mandatory Palestine ====
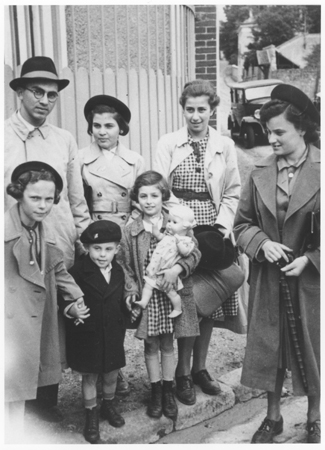
A group of passengers from the SS St. Louis arrive in France after the ship returned to Europe

Between 1933 and 1943, Mandatory Palestine received approximately 120,000 Jewish refugees. The Zionist movement facilitated the rehabilitation of displaced Jews in Mandatory Palestine, which was a destination for 18000 Jews escaping the Nazi regime through the Balkans between 1937 and 1944. There were more than 16000 Jews who later were bound for Palestine on boats from the Romanian and Bulgarian ports on the Black Sea and often through Turkey for refueling. One ship, MV Struma, was sunk, presumably accidentally, by a Soviet Navy submarine, in what is referred to as the Struma disaster. The SS Dora, initially launched in 1898 as SS Vega, was used by Zionist organizations to transport 480 German Jewish refugees, landing in Palestine on 12 August 1939.

==== Philippines ====
Manuel Quezon, the president of the Philippines, under the Open Doors policy planned to accept Jewish refugees from Europe. Then a Commonwealth, the United States limited the number of Jews to be admitted to its colony. 1200 Jews arrived in the Philippines from 1937 to 1941.

==== United States ====
The United States had about 27000 available visas in late 1938 for individuals for refugees. At that time, consulate offices outside the US were visited by 125000 applicants, and by June 1939, there had been more than 300000 applicants. This was far more than the US would allow into the country due to its immigration policy. The MS St. Louis sailed from Hamburg, Germany for Cuba, who had issued transit visas for more than 900 Jewish refugees, on a voyage that occurred from May to June 1939. Once the ship had arrived, the Cubans cancelled the refugees' visas. The ship was denied permission to land in the United States and Canada and it had to make a return voyage to Europe. Of 928 returning passengers, 288 were accepted by Britain, 366 survived the war on the continent, and 254 were murdered during the Holocaust. In 1944, the War Refugee Board (WRB) was established to assist tens of thousands of refugees, in coordination with the World Jewish Congress and the American Jewish Joint Distribution Committee, and an emergency shelter was established at Fort Ontario in New York, which housed almost 1000 refugees. Ultimately, however, the U.S. took in more European Jewish refugees in 1933-43 than any other country or territory, including Mandatory Palestine, accepting roughly 190,000.

==== China ====
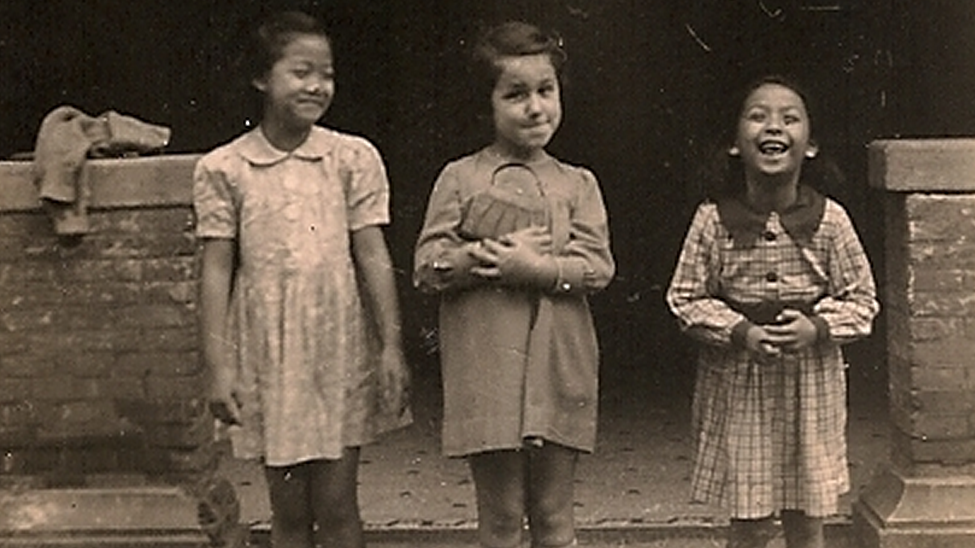
A Jewish girl playing with her Chinese friends in Shanghai

Shanghai was an important safe-haven for Jewish refugees during the Holocaust, since it was one of the few places in the world that did not require a visa or travel documents. The chaos of Shanghai during the Second Sino-Japanese war also meant that there were no customs officials, and therefore refugees (and others) were able to simply pass by the customs house when they arrived in the city. Shanghai experienced its greatest influx of Jewish refugees from 1939 to 1941. The Jewish communities already existing in China (Baghdadi Jews from the British colonies and Ashkenazi Jews from Russia) welcomed refugees and already had institutions such as synagogues into which Jewish refugees could be incorporated.

The Shanghai Jewish Refugees Museum commemorates the experience of Jewish refugees. Israeli Prime Minister Benjamin Netanyahu visited the museum and praised Shanghai's historic role as a sanctuary for Jewish refugees.

== International aid effort by Jewish/Zionist organizations ==
Organizations were established to assist refugees, like the World Jewish Congress, the Jewish Agency for Palestine, and the American Jewish Joint Distribution Committee. There were few non-Jews that helped the Jews escape, but there were some that risked their lives for the cause. Such people were later amongst what became known as the Righteous Among the Nations.

== Recovery of Jews after World War II ==
Palestine alone could absorb and provide for the homeless and the stateless Jews uprooted by the war. [...] It is to canalize all the sympathy of the world for the martyrdom of the Jews that the Zionists reject all schemes to resettle these victims elsewhere — in Germany, or Poland, or in sparsely populated regions such as Madagascar.

— Chaim Weizmann, first president of Israel

=== Liberation by the Allies ===
In May 1945, European Jews were released from concentration camps or came out of hiding, to find that they had lost family members and their former homes. The population of displaced persons also included more than 150000 Jews who had left Central and Eastern Europe due to violence and anti-Semitism. Countries continued to resist taking in Jews, however. The most favourable destinations for the displaced Jews were Palestine and the United States; in the latter, President Harry S. Truman issued the "Truman Directive," on 22 December 1945, and up to 40000 Jews entered the United States by 1 July 1948. That year, a law was enacted by Congress that increased immigration quotas to allow in approximately 80000 Jews, who were subject to what Truman called "flagrantly discriminatory" entry qualifications. About 102000 forced labourers and other individuals from the Baltics and Eastern Europe, who were Christians, were also allowed to be admitted to the US. There were 137,450 Jewish refugees who settled in the United States between 1945 and 1952.

=== Founding of the State of Israel ===
On 14 May 1948, the State of Israel was founded during the 1947–1949 Palestine war, and several million Jews emigrated from Europe and settled there.

== See also ==
- Expulsions and exoduses of Jews
- History of the Jews during World War II
- Jews escaping from Nazi Europe to Britain
- Timeline of the Holocaust

== Sources ==
- Doris L. Bergen (2009). The Holocaust: A Concise History. Rowman & Littlefield. p. 74. ISBN 978-0-7425-5714-7.
- Doris L. Bergen (10 March 2016). War and Genocide: A Concise History of the Holocaust. Rowman & Littlefield Publishers. p. 124. ISBN 978-1-4422-4229-6.
- Deborah Dwork; Robert Jan Pelt; Robert Jan Van Pelt (2003). Holocaust: A History. W.W. Norton. p. 93. ISBN 978-0-393-32524-9.
- Mike Lanchin (13 May 2014). "SS St Louis: The ship of Jewish refugees nobody wanted". BBC World Service.
- Daniel Snowman. The Hitler Emigrés. Chatto & Windus.
- Bernard Wasserstein (17 February 2011). "European Refugee Movements After World War Two".
- Leni Yahil (1991). "Closed Doors". The Holocaust: The Fate of European Jewry, 1932-1945. Oxford University Press. p. 93. ISBN 978-0-19-504523-9.
- "1938: Key Dates". Holocaust Encyclopedia, United States Holocaust Memorial Museum. Washington, DC.
- "German Jewish Refugees". Holocaust Encyclopedia, United States Holocaust Memorial Museum. Washington, DC.
- "Postwar Refugee Crisis and the Establishment of the State of Israel". Holocaust Encyclopedia, United States Holocaust Memorial Museum. Washington, DC.
- "Rescue". Holocaust Encyclopedia, United States Holocaust Memorial Museum. Washington, DC.
- "United Nations Relief and Rehabilitation Administration". Holocaust Encyclopedia, United States Holocaust Memorial Museum. Washington, DC.
