= Oscar Frithiof Nordqvist =

Finnish hydrographer

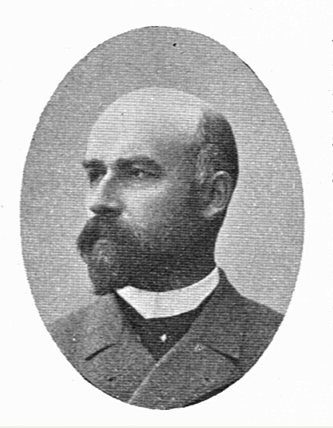
Oscar Frithiof Nordqvist

Oscar Frithiof Nordqvist Ph.D. (19 May 1858 – 1925) was a Finnish hydrographer.

At age twelve he was one of the first students at the art school of the Finnish art association. While serving as a Lieutenant in the military of the Grand Duchy of Finland, he accompanied Adolf Erik Nordenskiöld on S.S. Vega through the Northeast Passage in 1879, acting as the expedition's interpreter of Russian. In 1887 he was in charge of a hydrographical expedition to the Gulf of Bothnia, marking the start of hydrographical work in Finland. In 1901 he headed the Finnish delegation to the 2nd Conference for the Exploration of the Sea at Christiania.

== See also ==
- Vega expedition
