= Cape Chelyuskin =

Northernmost point of mainland Russia

Cape Chelyuskin мыс Челюскина
- Cape
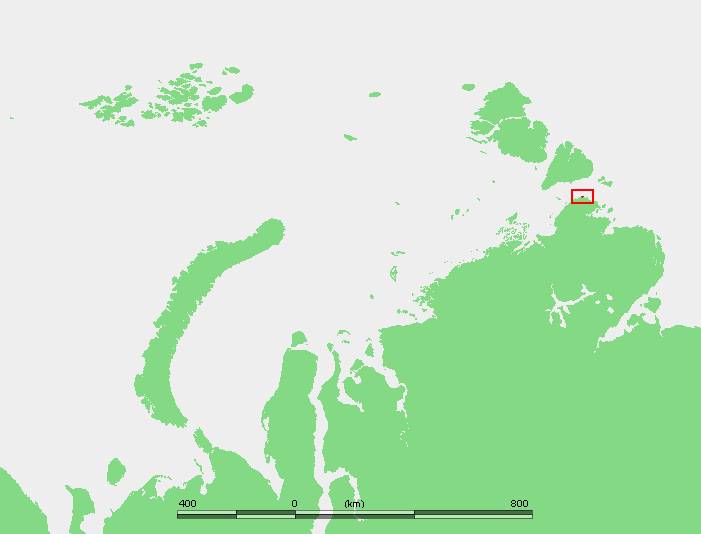
- Location of Cape Chelyuskin at the northern end of the Taymyr Peninsula

- Location within Russia
- Coordinates: 77°44′0″N 104°15′0″E
- Location: Krasnoyarsk Krai, Russia
- Water bodies: Kara Sea; Laptev Sea

Cape Chelyuskin (Russian: Мыс Челюскина, Mys Chelyuskina) is the northernmost point of the Eurasian continent (and indeed of any continental mainland), and the northernmost point of mainland Russia. It is situated at the tip of the Taymyr Peninsula, south of Severnaya Zemlya archipelago, in Krasnoyarsk Krai, Russia. The headland has a 17-metre-high (56 ft) light on a framework tower.

Cape Chelyuskin is 1,371 kilometres (852 mi) from the North Pole. Cape Vega is a headland located a little to the west of Cape Chelyuskin. Oscar Bay lies between both capes.

== History ==
The cape was first reached in May 1742 by an expedition on land party led by Semion Chelyuskin, and was initially called Cape East-Northern. It was renamed in honour of Chelyuskin by the Russian Geographical Society in 1842, on the 100th anniversary of the discovery.

It was passed on 18 August 1878 by Adolf Erik Nordenskiöld during the first sea voyage through the Northeast Passage.

In 1919 Norwegian explorer Roald Amundsen's ship Maud left behind two men, Peter Tessem and Paul Knutsen, at Cape Chelyuskin after having made winter quarters there. The Maud continued eastwards into the Laptev Sea and the men were instructed to wait for the freeze-up of the Kara Sea and then sledge southwestwards towards Dikson carrying Amundsen's mail. However, these two men disappeared mysteriously. In 1922 Nikifor Begichev led a Soviet expedition in search for Peter Tessem and Paul Knutsen on request of the government of Norway, but Begichev was not successful. Clues to their fate were not found until 1922.

A weather and a hydrology research base named "Polar Station Cape Chelyuskin" was constructed in 1932, and headed by Ivan Papanin. It was renamed the "E. K. Fyodorov Hydrometeorological Observatory" in 1983. The station has a magnetic observatory and stands on the eastern side of the point.

Systematic geological survey for uranium began at Cape Chelyuskin in 1946–47 with industrial extraction between 1950 and 1952 in a mountain 150 km south of the cape proper.

The cape hosts the northernmost airfield in Afro-Eurasia, in operation at various locations since 1950.

== Climate ==
Cape Chelyuskin has a tundra climate (Köppen climate classification ET), with no month having a low above freezing. Winters last year round, but may be broken up during the meteorological summer months by short spells of above average temperatures. Snowfall is usual year round, with every year experiencing snow during every month including summer months. Sunshine hours peak during April, and begin to sharply drop off during the end of July or early August.

Climate data for Cape Chelyuskin
Month	Jan	Feb	Mar	Apr	May	Jun	Jul	Aug	Sep	Oct	Nov	Dec	Year
Record high °C (°F)	0.3 (32.5)	−0.5 (31.1)	−0.4 (31.3)	6.3 (43.3)	8.2 (46.8)	15.6 (60.1)	23.3 (73.9)	21.6 (70.9)	13.4 (56.1)	5.4 (41.7)	0.2 (32.4)	−0.6 (30.9)	23.3 (73.9)
Mean daily maximum °C (°F)	−24 (−11)	−23.9 (−11.0)	−21.7 (−7.1)	−15.2 (4.6)	−6.8 (19.8)	0.8 (33.4)	3.5 (38.3)	3.6 (38.5)	0.2 (32.4)	−7.2 (19.0)	−15.6 (3.9)	−21.3 (−6.3)	−10.6 (12.9)
Daily mean °C (°F)	−27.2 (−17.0)	−27.1 (−16.8)	−25.1 (−13.2)	−18.6 (−1.5)	−9.1 (15.6)	−0.9 (30.4)	1.5 (34.7)	1.6 (34.9)	−1.4 (29.5)	−9.6 (14.7)	−18.7 (−1.7)	−24.4 (−11.9)	−13.2 (8.1)
Mean daily minimum °C (°F)	−30.5 (−22.9)	−30.2 (−22.4)	−28.5 (−19.3)	−21.7 (−7.1)	−11.4 (11.5)	−2.3 (27.9)	0.0 (32.0)	0.1 (32.2)	−3.0 (26.6)	−12.4 (9.7)	−21.9 (−7.4)	−27.4 (−17.3)	−15.8 (3.6)
Record low °C (°F)	−48.8 (−55.8)	−45.8 (−50.4)	−45.9 (−50.6)	−41.7 (−43.1)	−28.9 (−20.0)	−18.0 (−0.4)	−5.6 (21.9)	−9.0 (15.8)	−21.2 (−6.2)	−33.6 (−28.5)	−41.9 (−43.4)	−45.6 (−50.1)	−48.8 (−55.8)
Average precipitation mm (inches)	11 (0.4)	12 (0.5)	12 (0.5)	14 (0.6)	15 (0.6)	14 (0.6)	27 (1.1)	32 (1.3)	23 (0.9)	22 (0.9)	15 (0.6)	13 (0.5)	210 (8.5)
Average rainy days	0	0	0	0	0.4	6	13	13	6	0.6	0	0	38
Average snowy days	16	15	15	15	22	11	4	6	16	24	21	17	183
Average relative humidity (%)	83	83	82	83	86	90	93	94	91	86	84	83	86
Mean monthly sunshine hours	0.0	4.0	113.0	252.0	216.0	145.0	161.0	95.0	43.0	15.0	0.0	0.0	1,044
Source 1: pogoda.ru.net
Source 2: NOAA (sun only, 1961-1990)

== Photo gallery ==
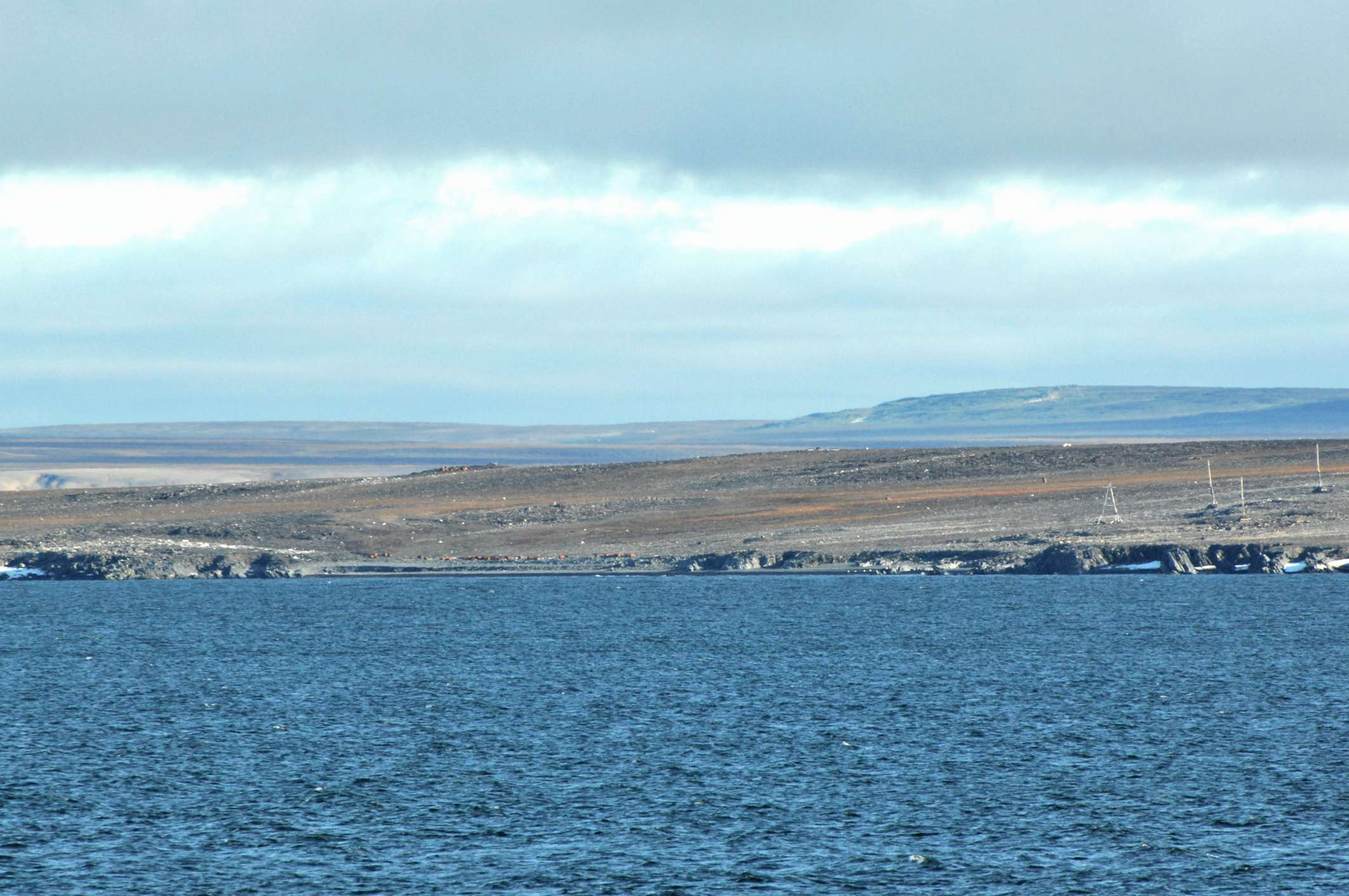
Cape Chelyuskin, northernmost point of Russian and of Eurasian mainland; 77°43’22’’N, 104°15’13’’E

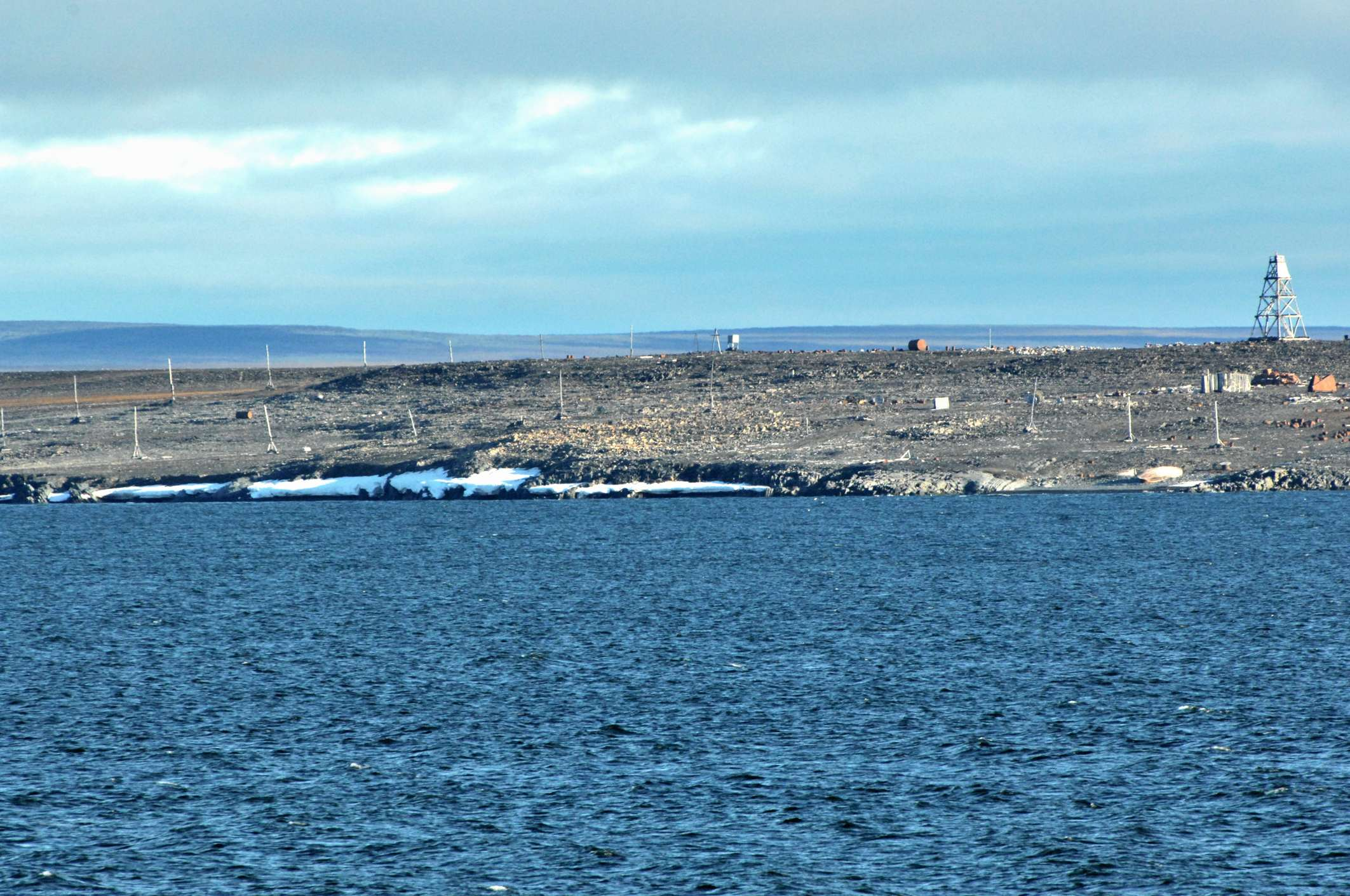
Polar station at Cape Chelyuskin

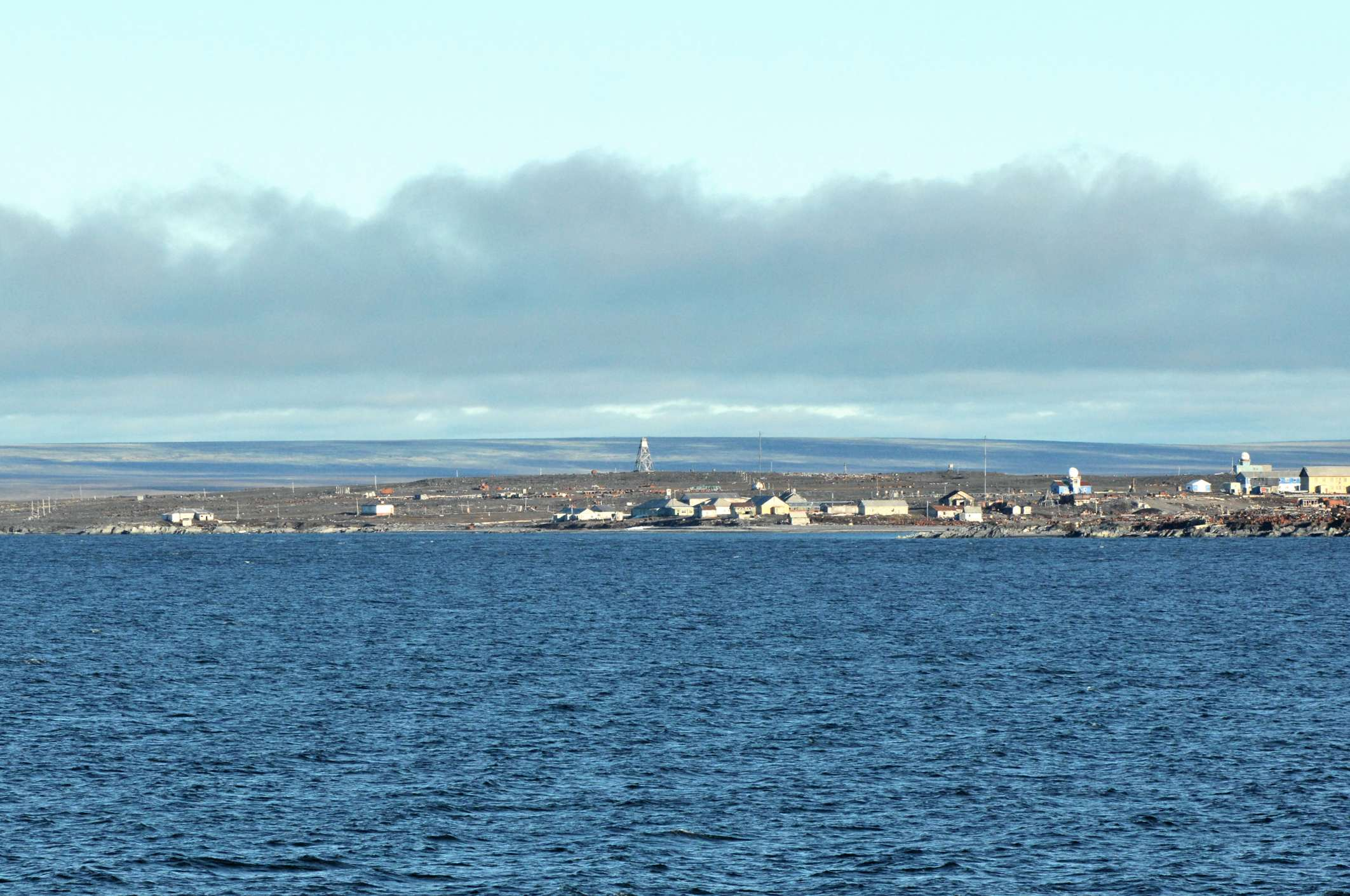
Polar station at Cape Chelyuskin

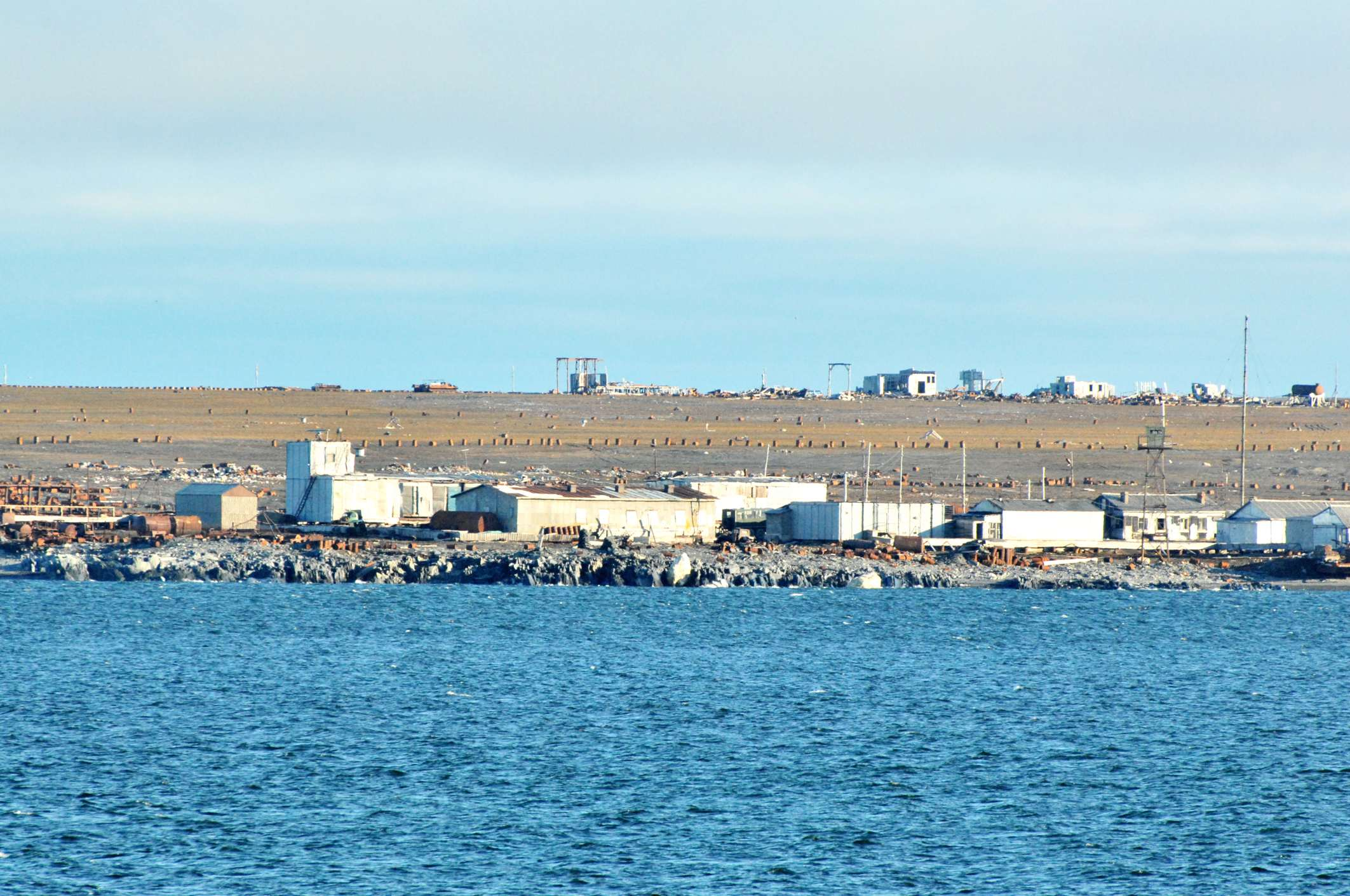
Polar station at Cape Chelyuskin

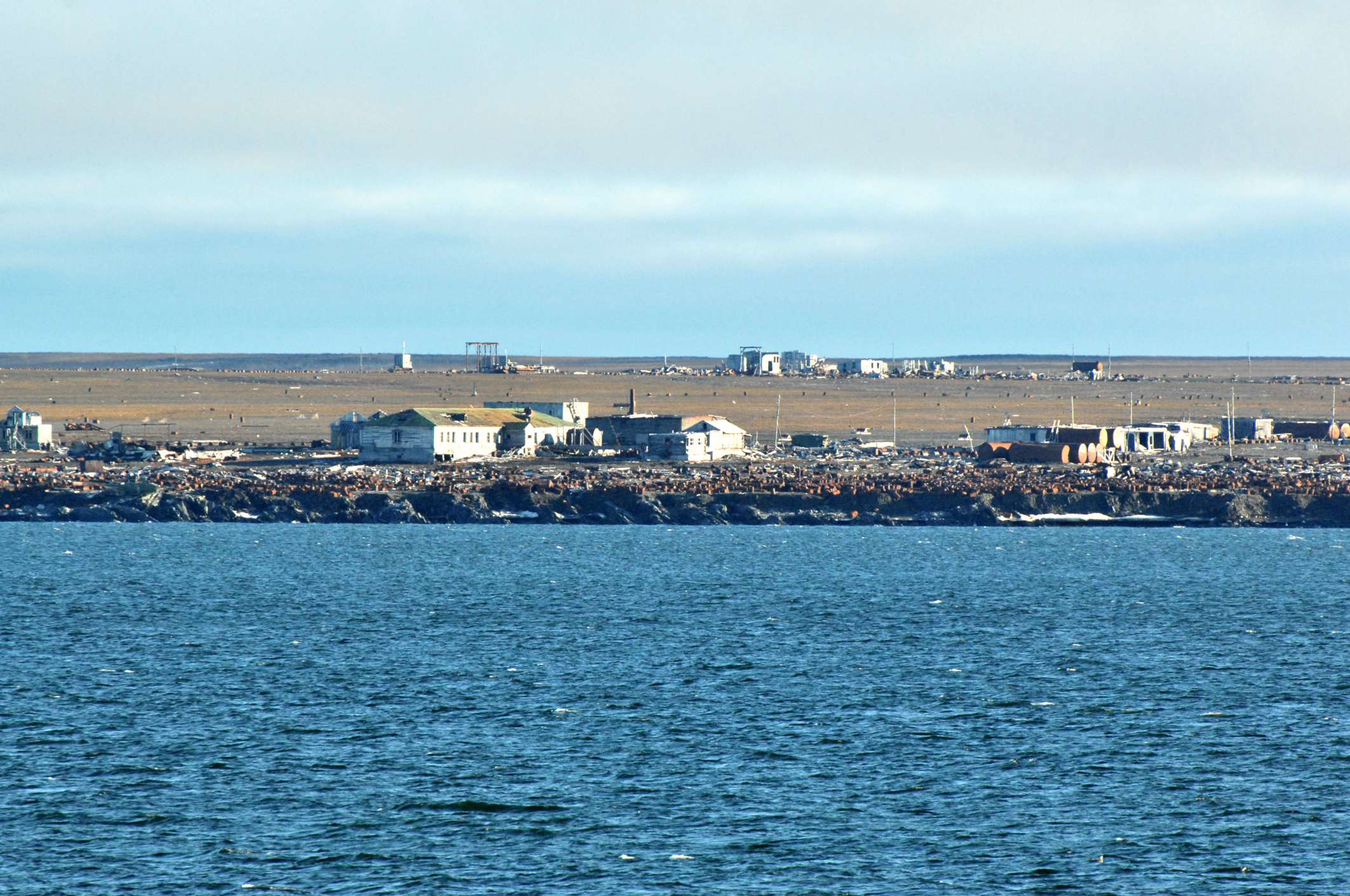
Polar station at Cape Chelyuskin

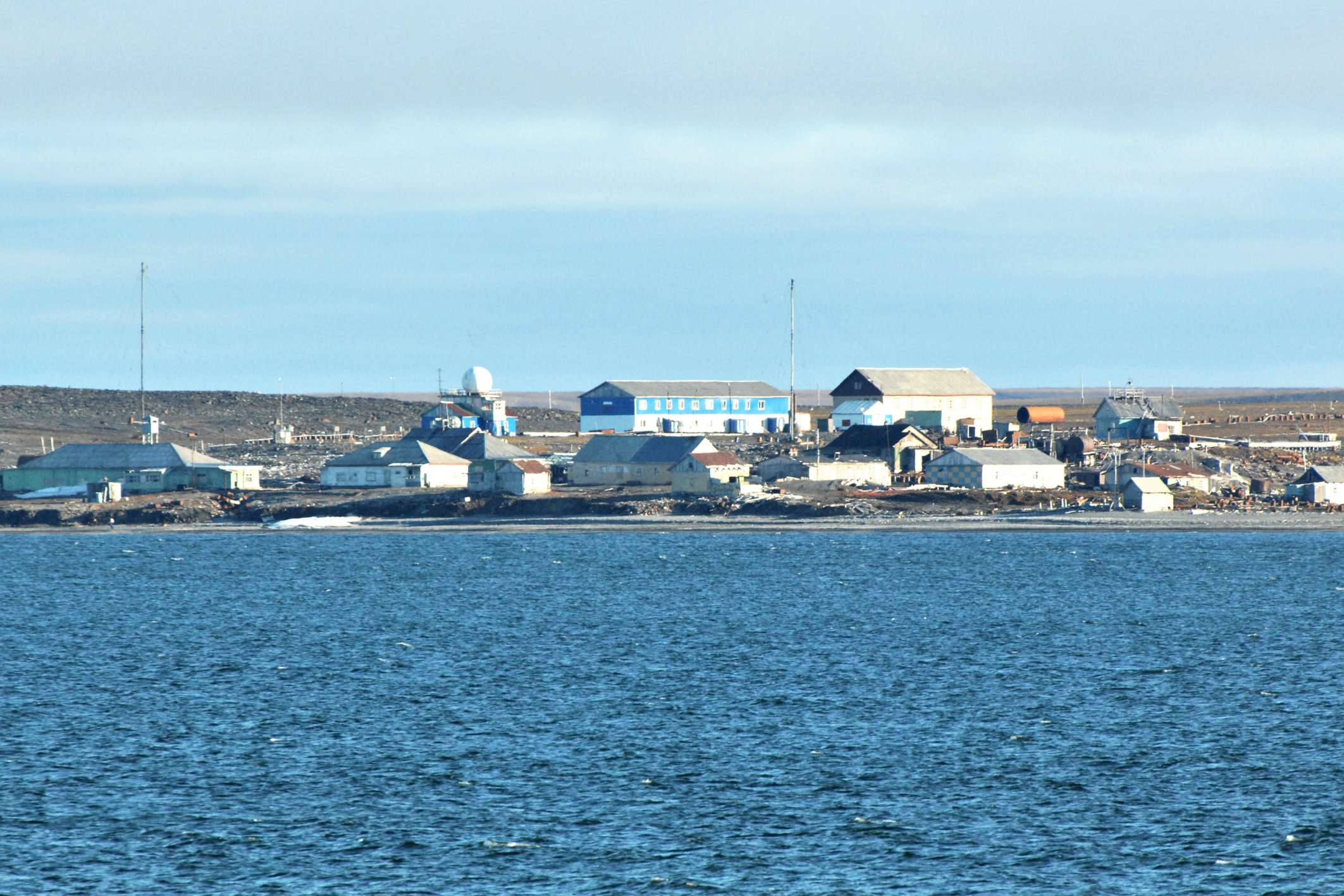
Polar station at Cape Chelyuskin

== See also ==
- List of research stations in the Arctic
- List of northernmost items
