= Alexander Sibiryakov =

Russian explorer and entrepreneur (1849–1933)

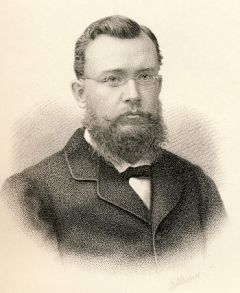
- Born: 8 October [O.S. 26 September] 1849; Irkutsk, Russia
- Died: 2 November 1933 (aged 84); Nice, France
- Occupations: Entrepreneur; explorer
- Known for: Exploring Siberia

Alexander Mikhaylovich Sibiryakov (Russian: Алекса́ндр Миха́йлович Сибиряко́в; 8 October [O.S. 26 September] 1849 in Irkutsk – 2 November 1933) was a Russian entrepreneur and explorer of Siberia.

== Biography ==
Sibiryakov graduated from the Zurich Polytechnic Institute in Switzerland. Later in life, he financed the polar expeditions of Adolf Erik Nordenskiöld (see Vega Expedition) and A. V. Grigoriev. He also sponsored the publication of works on Siberia's history. In 1880, he made an attempt to enter the Yenisei estuary through the Kara Sea on a schooner. In 1884, Sibiryakov reached the Pechora estuary on the "Nordenskjöld" steamer and proceeded up the river. He then crossed the Urals using reindeers and reached Tobolsk by the Tobol River. Sibiryakov contributed significantly to Siberia's economic development.

After the Russian Revolution of 1917, Sibiryakov left Russia and spent the rest of his life in exile. He died in Nice, France, in poverty, aged 84. His funeral was paid for by Swedish government, as a sign of gratitude for Sibiryakov's friendly relations with Sweden. The news reports at the time stated that only the consul of Sweden and two other members of the Swedish diplomatic mission in France attended Sibiryakov's funeral.

== Legacy ==
Sibiryakov Island, an island in the Kara Sea at the mouth of the Yenisei River, is named after him, as well as icebreakers A. Sibiryakov and Sibiryakov.

== See also ==
- Otto Schmidt
- Captain Vladimir Voronin

== Sources ==
- "Сибиряков, Александр Михайлович" . Brockhaus and Efron Encyclopedic Dictionary (in Russian). 1906.
- Semyonov, Yuri (1963). Siberia: its conquest and development. Translated by Foster, J. R. Hollis & Carter. ASIN B0000CLTTO. OCLC 2953712.
