= Cape Hope =

Headland in east Greenland

Cape Hope Noorajik Kangitteq
- Cape
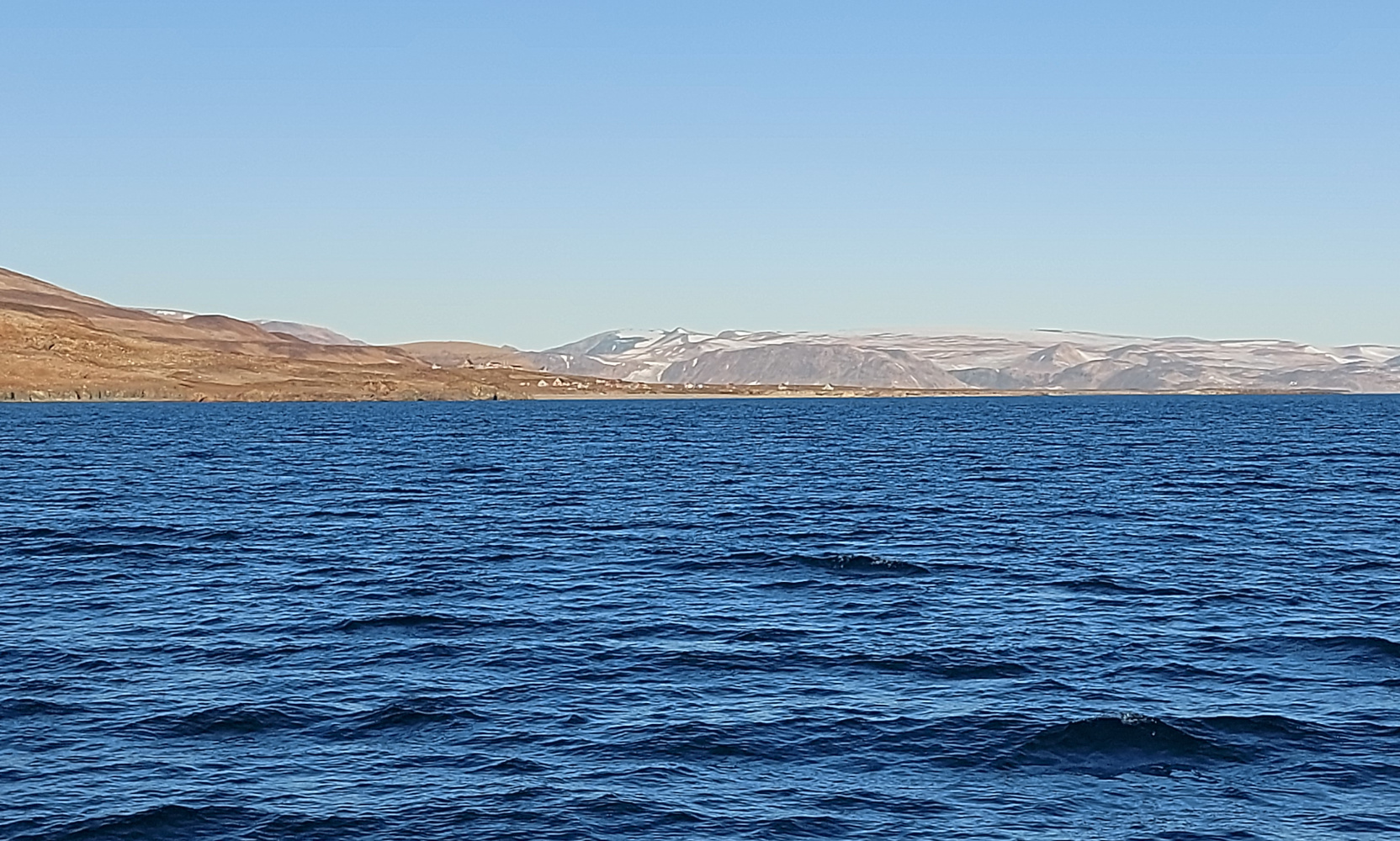

- Coordinates: 70°27.7′N 22°22.9′W
- Location: Sermersooq, Greenland
- Offshore water bodies: Scoresby Sound; Greenland Sea

Area
  - Total: Arctic
- Elevation: 23

Cape Hope (Danish: Kap Hope; Greenlandic: Noorajik Kangitteq, meaning 'the western little cape') is a headland in the Scoresby Sound, east Greenland, Sermersooq municipality.

There was a hamlet east of the cape known as Kap Hope (Itserajivit or Ittaajimmiit, in East and West Greenlandic, respectively). This settlement was closed in 2005. It appeared in one episode of the Canadian series Departures.

== History ==
This headland was named Cape Hope by William Scoresby (1789 – 1857) in 1822 to honour Samuel Hope esq. of Everton, Liverpool, grandfather of Samuel Morley, 1st Baron Hollenden.

== Geography ==
Cape Hope is the southwesternmost point of Liverpool Land. It rises east of the mouth of Hurry Inlet, opposite Cape Stewart.

It is located in the northern shore of Scoresby Sound, near Ittoqqortoormiit.

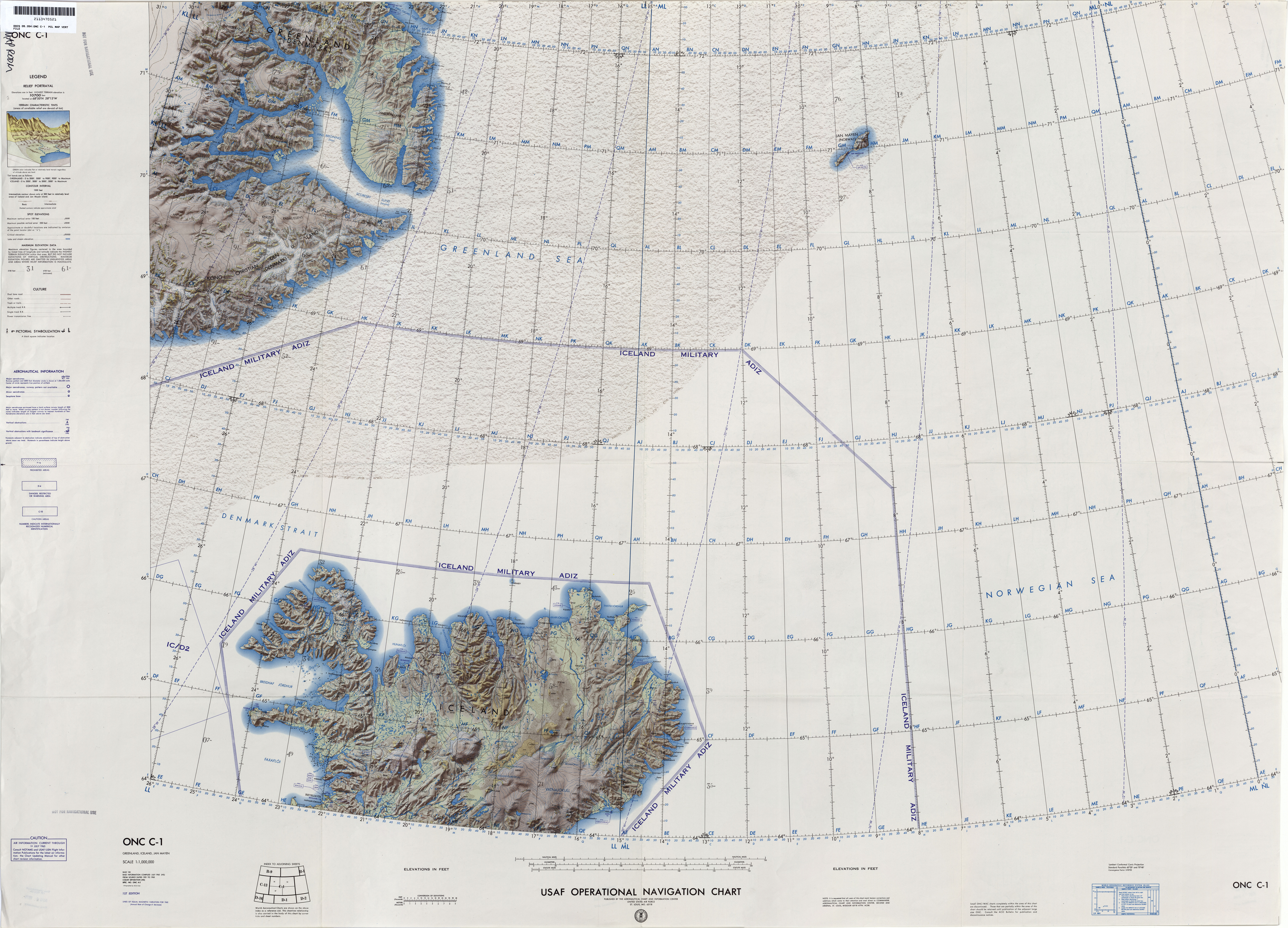
Map of NE Greenland and Iceland.

== See also ==
- Geography of Greenland
