= Jameson Land =

Peninsula in eastern Greenland

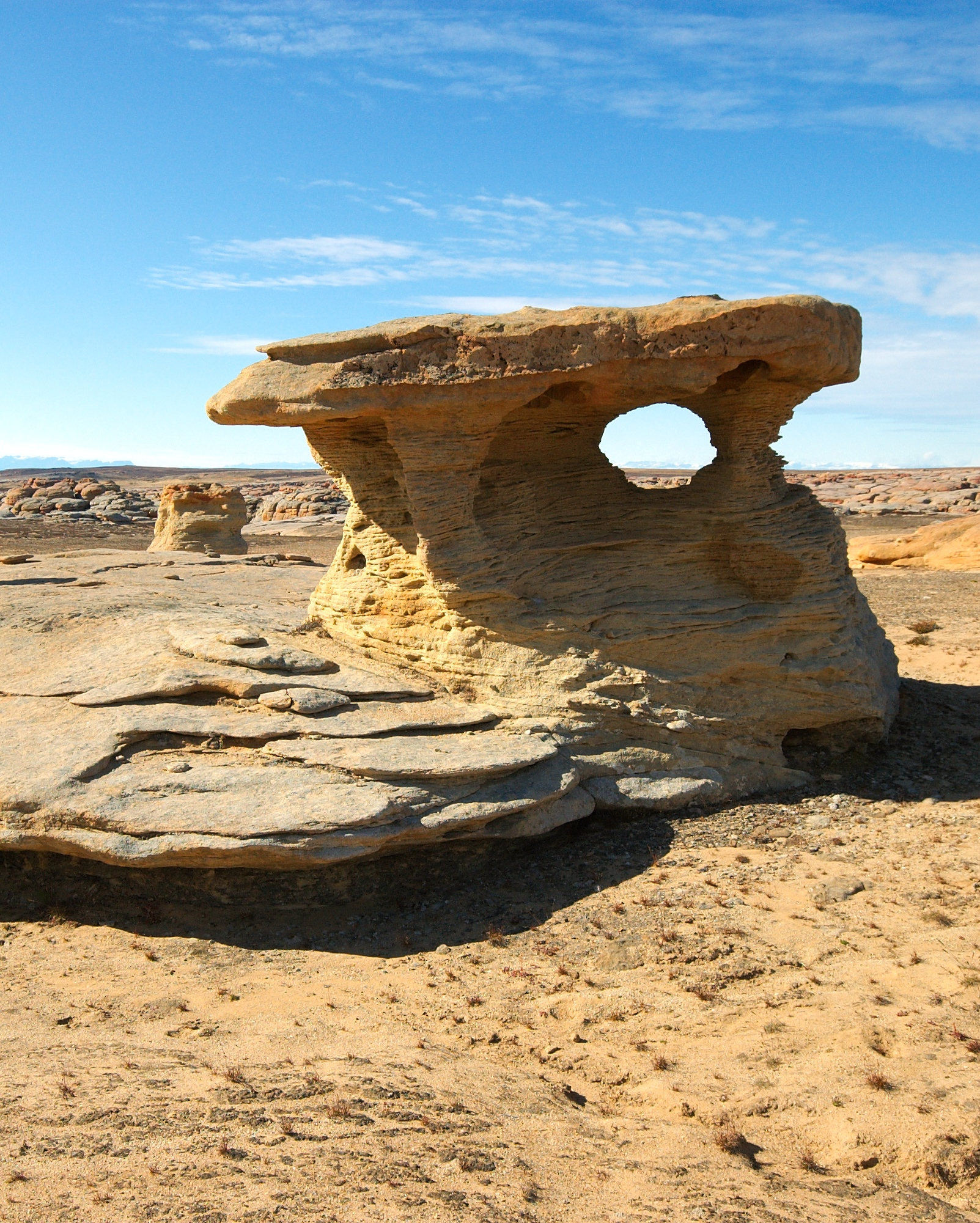
- Aeolian sandstone in Jameson Land

- Location within Greenland

Geography
- Location: Greenland
- Coordinates: 71°10′N 23°30′W
- Adjacent to: Carlsberg Fjord; Scoresby Sound; Greenland Sea
- Highest elevation: 1,444 m (4738 ft)

Administration
- Greenland (Denmark)
- Zone: NE Greenland National Park

Jameson Land is a peninsula in eastern Greenland. The peninsula is located north of Scoresby Sound, opposite of King Christian IX Land. Administratively it falls within Sermersooq municipality.

== Geography ==
Jameson Land is bounded to the south by Scoresby Sound (the world's largest fjord), to the northwest by the Stauning Alps, to the north by Scoresby Land, to the northeast by the Fleming Fjord and the Nathorst Fjord of the Greenland Sea, and to the east by Carlsberg Fjord, the smaller Liverpool Land peninsula branching off, and Hurry Inlet. Its northeastern end is Cape Biot.

=== Climate ===
Jameson Land experiences a tundra climate (Köppen: ET); with short, cool summers and long, frigid winters. Temperature & humidity data within the weatherbox below was recorded from the Nerlerit Inaat Airport (2002-2020) and precipitation was sourced from Uunarteq (1958-1980).

Climate data for Jameson Land (Nerlerit Inaat Airport) (70.33°N 22.65°W) (14 m (46 ft) AMSL) (2002-2020 data)
Month	Jan	Feb	Mar	Apr	May	Jun	Jul	Aug	Sep	Oct	Nov	Dec	Year
Record high °C (°F)	15.6 (60.1)	8.7 (47.7)	6.3 (43.3)	11.8 (53.2)	11.3 (52.3)	20.3 (68.5)	21.7 (71.1)	22.0 (71.6)	12.7 (54.9)	7.8 (46.0)	5.2 (41.4)	6.6 (43.9)	22.0 (71.6)
Mean daily maximum °C (°F)	−10.1 (13.8)	−11.1 (12.0)	−11.8 (10.8)	−6.0 (21.2)	0.7 (33.3)	6.7 (44.1)	10.5 (50.9)	10.0 (50.0)	4.3 (39.7)	−2.5 (27.5)	−7.7 (18.1)	−10.1 (13.8)	−2.3 (27.9)
Daily mean °C (°F)	−14.1 (6.6)	−15.3 (4.5)	−15.9 (3.4)	−9.9 (14.2)	−2.2 (28.0)	3.1 (37.6)	6.7 (44.1)	6.5 (43.7)	1.7 (35.1)	−4.8 (23.4)	−10.9 (12.4)	−13.9 (7.0)	−5.7 (21.7)
Mean daily minimum °C (°F)	−18.5 (−1.3)	−20.3 (−4.5)	−21.4 (−6.5)	−15.5 (4.1)	−5.7 (21.7)	0.2 (32.4)	3.5 (38.3)	3.1 (37.6)	−1.1 (30.0)	−7.6 (18.3)	−14.4 (6.1)	−18.1 (−0.6)	−9.6 (14.7)
Record low °C (°F)	−38.1 (−36.6)	−38.8 (−37.8)	−39.1 (−38.4)	−32.2 (−26.0)	−20.7 (−5.3)	−7.2 (19.0)	−1.1 (30.0)	−2.4 (27.7)	−10.0 (14.0)	−23.3 (−9.9)	−26.7 (−16.1)	−33.3 (−27.9)	−39.1 (−38.4)
Average precipitation mm (inches)	49 (1.9)	39 (1.5)	47 (1.9)	28 (1.1)	26 (1.0)	24 (0.9)	29 (1.1)	48 (1.9)	47 (1.9)	65 (2.6)	42 (1.7)	49 (1.9)	502 (19.8)
Average extreme snow depth cm (inches)	113 (44)	132 (52)	159 (63)	167 (66)	141 (56)	65 (26)	12 (4.7)	0 (0)	4 (1.6)	27 (11)	62 (24)	86 (34)	167 (66)
Average precipitation days (≥ 1.0 mm)	8.5	6.9	9.1	6.3	5.1	4.3	4.0	6.0	6.0	8.2	7.3	8.1	80.8
Average snowy days	12.0	10.4	12.8	9.3	6.7	3.1	0.4	1.7	6.5	11.3	10.7	11.7	97.0
Average relative humidity (%)	71.2	70.0	68.2	70.2	78.8	81.3	78.0	73.5	70.8	72.4	67.6	66.9	72.4
Source: Danish Meteorological Institute (2002-2020 temperature & humidity) (1958-1980 precipitation & snow)

== Ecology ==
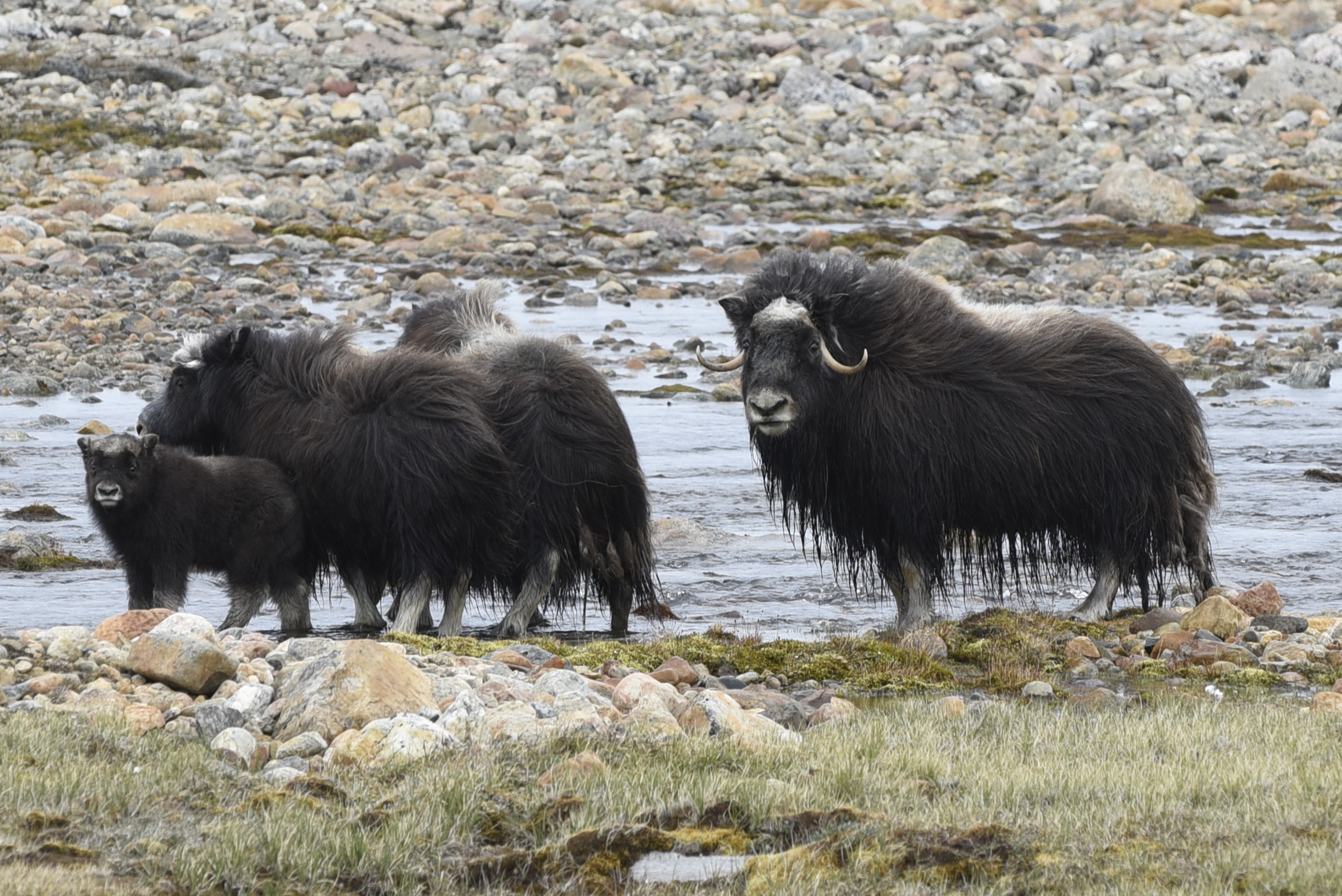
Greenlandic muskoxen

The peninsula's flora includes alpine foxtail, arctic bell-heather, arctic willow, Bigelow's sedge, bog blueberries, various types of cottongrass, dwarf birch, Kentucky bluegrass, moss campion, mountain avens, varioues sedges, slim-stem small reed grass, wideleaf polargrass and the fungus Stereocaulon alpinum.

The peninsula is home to muskoxen, who sustain themselves off mainly willows during summer and various graminoids during winter. As of 2000, the population estimate for muskoxen in Jameson Land is 1,705.

Reindeer used to live in Jameson Land. The Arctic reindeer (East Greenland caribou) (Rangifer tarandus eogroenlandicus) subspecies that once lived in the peninsula and across Northeast Greenland was last seen in 1899 near Hurry Inlet, and in the same year they were seen in Kaiser Franz Joseph Fjord and in King Oscar Fjord, north of Jameson Land. The subspecies was declared extinct in 1900.

== Geology ==
Jameson Land mainly consists of a tilted peneplain of Jurassic sandstone, highest in the east. In the northern end there are also rocks of Triassic age. Two formations are predominant in Jameson Land: the Triassic Fleming Fjord Formation and the Jurassic Kap Stewart Formation. Triassic fossils of the Fleming Fjord Formation in Jameson Land include: the dipnoi Ceratodus, prosauropod and theropod dinosaurs bones and tracks, sauropod tracks, phytosaurs, temnospondyls, and sharks.

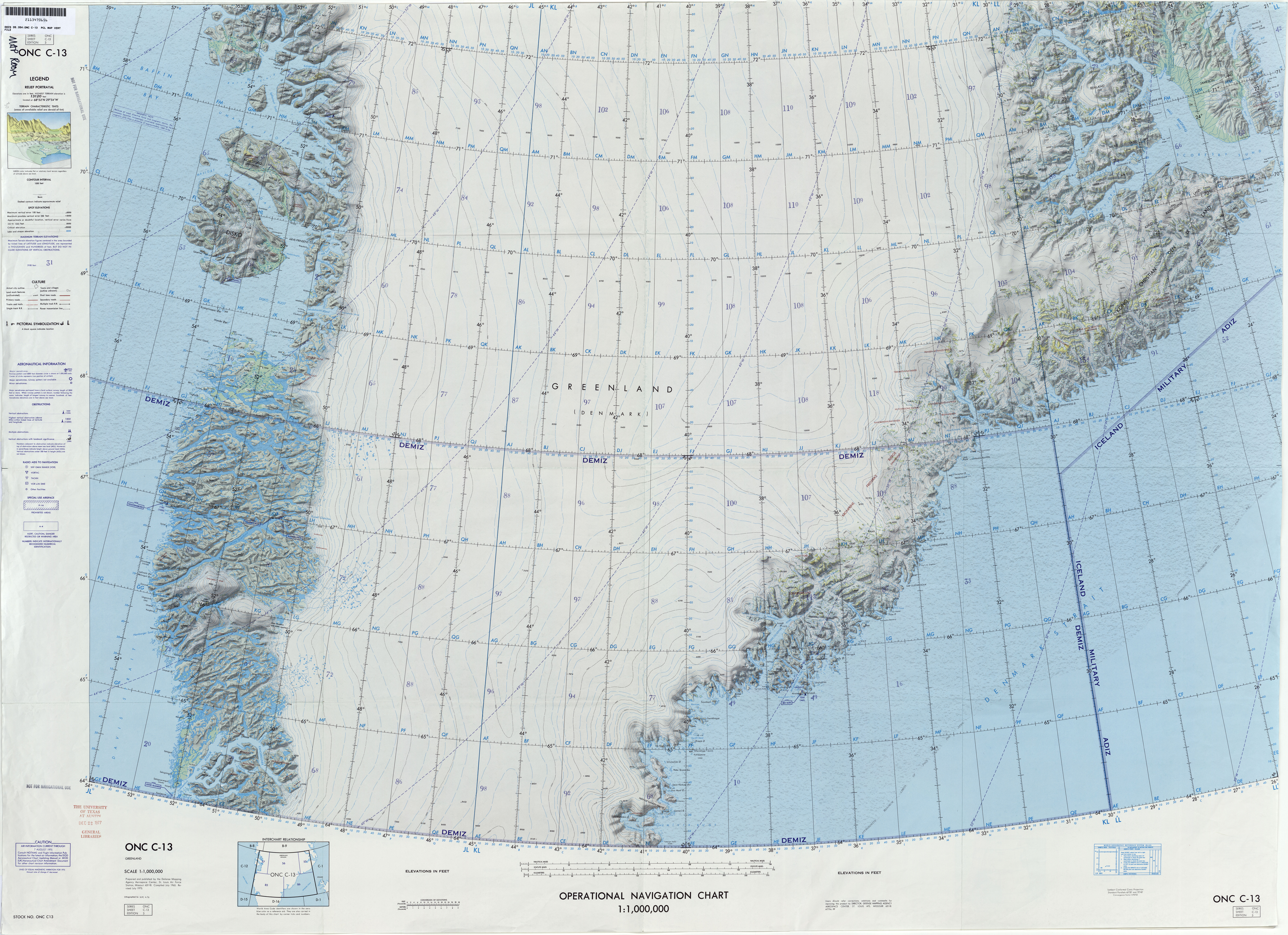
Map of Greenland section

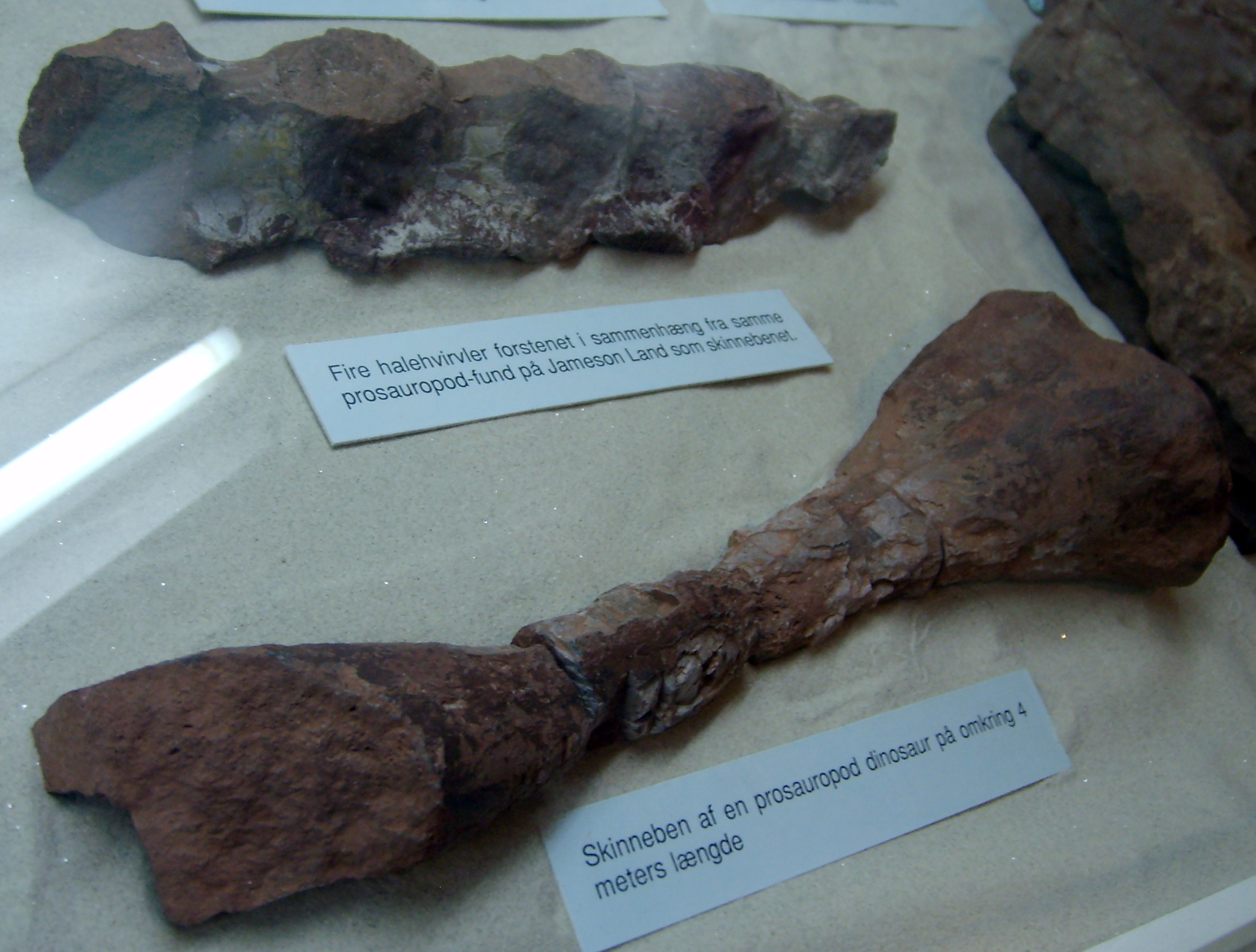
Tail vertebrae and tibia of a 4 meter long prosauropod dinosaur from Jameson Land, at the Geological Museum in Copenhagen

== Notable events ==
In 2026, an American company based in Texas called Greenland Energy planned to drill for crude oil there. This was scrutinized by Greenland's government since they did not receive permission, and contravenes the Ramsar Convention. Greenland Energy (chairman Larry Gene Swets Jr., CFA; Kenneth C. Griffin, 9 percent owner) unloaded drilling equipment without authorization on the east coast of Greenland.

== See also ==
- Eudimorphodon
- Fleming Fjord Formation
