= Ittoqqortoormiit Heliport =

Heliport in Greenland

- IATA: OBY; ICAO: BGSC

Summary
- Airport type: Public
- Operator: Greenland Airport Authority (Mittarfeqarfiit)
- Serves: Ittoqqortoormiit, Greenland
- Elevation AMSL: 238 ft / 73 m
- Coordinates: 70°29′18″N 021°58′18″W
- Website: Ittoqqortoormiit heliport

Map
- Location in Greenland

Helipads
Number	Length		Surface
Number	m	ft	Surface
1	13.5	44	Asphalt

Statistics (2012)
- Passengers: 834
- Aircraft movements: 427
- Source: Danish AIS; Statistics from airport

Ittoqqortoormiit Heliport (IATA: OBY, ICAO: BGSC) is a heliport in Ittoqqortoormiit, a village in the Sermersooq municipality in eastern Greenland.

== Airlines and destinations ==
Airlines	Destinations
Air Greenland	Nerlerit Inaat

Because of passenger capacity, the helicopters do up to four flights for each departing airplane. There are 50 minutes between these helicopter departures, causing a longer total travel time for many passengers. The distance by helicopter to Nerlerit Inaat is 38 kilometres (24 mi).

== Relocation ==
The relocation of the Nerlerit Inaat Airport to a new site on Liverpool Land closer to Ittoqqortoormiit, between the settlement and Uunarteq cape (Danish: Kap Tobin) to the south has been considered since the 2000s. This would eliminate the need for helicopter transfers. The project would be economical if the need for the helicopter could be eliminated; however, it would still be needed for search and rescue.

In 2025, a decision was made to construct an airport in Ittoqqortoormiit, financed by the Danish state.
