= Hurry Inlet =

Fjord in King Christian X Land, Greenland

- Hurry Fjord
- Kangerterajiva (Greenlandic)
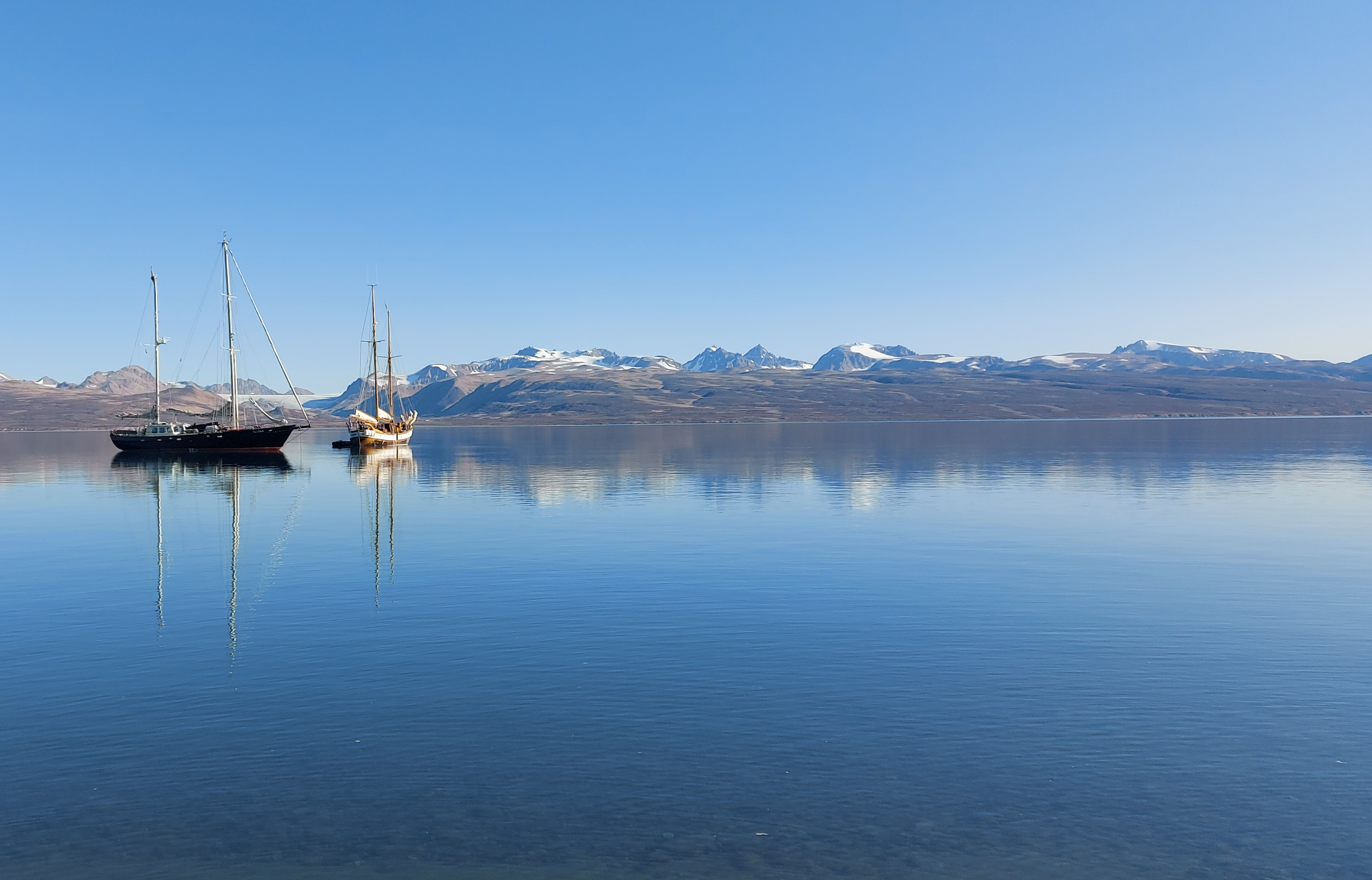

- Location in Greenland
- Location: Arctic
- Coordinates: 70°37′N 22°31′W
- Ocean/sea sources: Scoresby Sound; Greenland Sea
- Basin countries: Greenland
- Max. length: 40 km (25 mi)
- Max. width: 7 km (4.3 mi)

Hurry Inlet (Danish: Hurry Fjord; Greenlandic: Kangerterajiva, meaning 'The Little Fjord') is a fjord in King Christian X Land, eastern Greenland. It is part of the Scoresby Sound system. Administratively it lies in the area of Sermersooq municipality.

Nerlerit Inaat Airport is located on the western side of the fjord. People from nearby Ittoqqortoormiit like to go to Hurry Inlet to fish Arctic char for recreational purposes.

== History ==
The Hurry Inlet was named "Hurry’s Inlet" in 1822 by William Scoresby (1789–1857) in honour of Nicholas Hurry, the owner of his ship, the Baffin. Scoresby assumed that it was a sound that connected with Carlsberg Fjord to the north and that Liverpool Land was an island. Carl Ryder found that the fjord was a dead end and not a marine channel in 1895. The name often appears as "Hurry Fjord" on Danish maps.

There are ancient Inuit ruins by the fjord.

== Geography ==
This fjord is located west of Ittoqqortoormiit in the northern shore of Scoresby Sound. Its mouth opens between Cape Hope to the east and Cape Stewart to the west only about 20 km (12 mi) west of the entrance of Scoresby Sound. It stretches from north to south for about 40 km (25 mi).

To the west the fjord is bound by Jameson Land and to the east by Liverpool Land. The northern end of Hurry Inlet continues northward beyond its head as the Klitdal (Kangerterajittap Ilinnera). The Hans Glacier and the Greta Glacier have their terminus in the shores of the fjord.

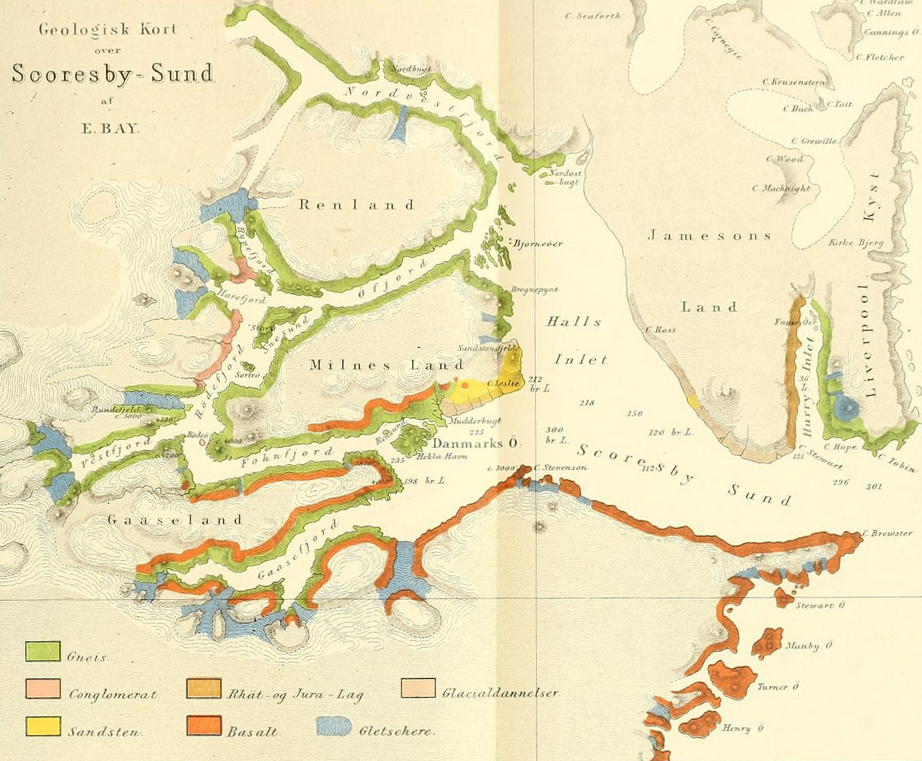
Geological map of Scoresby Sound

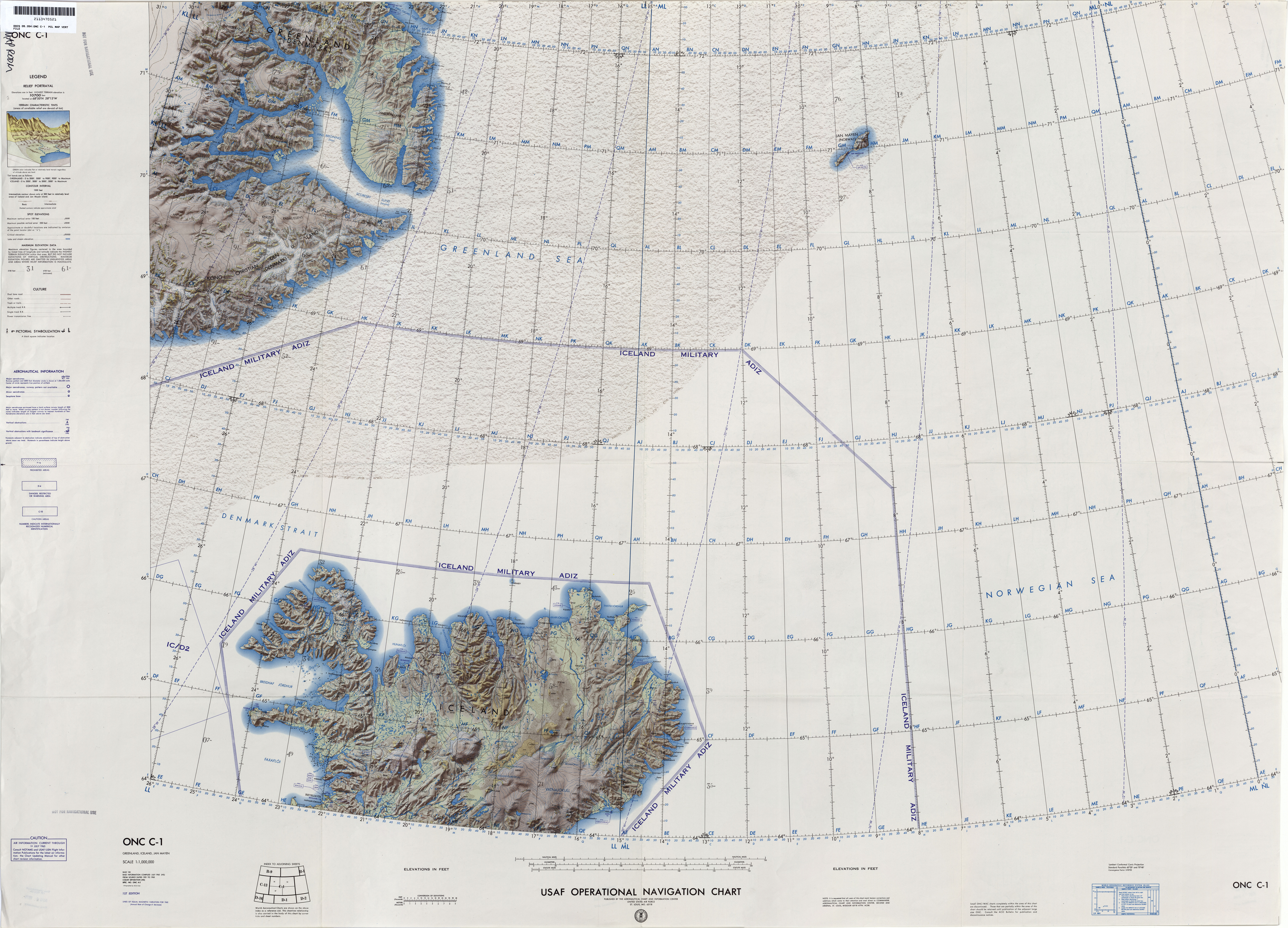
Map of NE Greenland and Iceland

== See also ==
- List of fjords of Greenland
