= Carlsberg Fjord =

Fjord in Greenland

- Kangerterajitta Itterterilaq (Greenlandic)
- Map of Northeastern Greenland

- Location in Greenland
- Location: Arctic
- Coordinates: 71°27′N 22°24′W
- Ocean/sea sources: Greenland Sea
- Basin countries: Greenland
- Max. length: 42 km (26 mi)
- Max. width: 8 km (5.0 mi)
- Settlements: 0

Carlsberg Fjord (Greenlandic: Kangerterajitta Itterterilaq) is a fjord in King Christian X Land, eastern Greenland.

Administratively it lies in the Sermersooq Municipality.

== History ==
This fjord was first noted by British explorer William Scoresby (1789 – 1857), who assumed that it connected with Hurry Inlet to the south. It was first properly surveyed and mapped by Danish Arctic explorer Georg Carl Amdrup during the Carlsberg Foundation Expedition to East Greenland (Carlsbergfondet Expedition til Ost-Gronland) in 1898–1900. Amdrup named the fjord after the Carlsberg Foundation.

Carlsberg Fjord marked the southern border of Erik the Red's Land in 1932–1933.

The Greenlandic name Kangerterajitta Itterterilaq was recorded in 1955 by the Geodætisk Institut, referring to the relative positions of the fjord and Hurry Inlet to the south.

== Geography ==
Carlsberg Fjord is located SE of the mouth of Davy Sound, separating Jameson Land to the west from Liverpool Land to the east. Its mouth opens to the northeast, between Cape Fletcher in the Canning Land Peninsula to the north and Cape Greville on the northeastern side, west of Reynolds Island. Nathorst Fjord lies beyond the Canning Land Peninsula. Both shores of the outer section of the fjord have deep indentations. It extends roughly southwards for about 42 km (26 mi) and it is fairly broad and deep, narrowing close to its head.

Instead of a glacier at the fjord's head there is the Klitdal, a long valley continuing southwards.

== See also ==
- List of fjords of Greenland

== Bibliography ==
- Callomon, J.H. 1970: Geological map of the Carlsberg Fjord – Fossil bjerget area. Meddelelser om Grønland 168(4), 10 pp.
