= Cape Hope (disambiguation) =

Cape Hope may refer to:

Places

- Cape Hope, Greenland
- Cape of Good Hope, South Africa
- Cape Hope Islands, Nunavut, Canada
- Cape Hedo, Okinawa

Other

- Cape Hope squid
