= Stevens Rock =

Stevens Rock (67°37′S 64°42′E) is a small, lone bare rock 2.8 kilometres (1.5 nmi) east of Strahan Glacier and 2 kilometres (1 nmi) off the coast of Antarctica. Discovered in February 1931 by the British Australian New Zealand Antarctic Research Expedition (BANZARE) under Mawson, who named it for Commander C.W. Stevens, Hydrographic Dept., Royal Australian Navy.
