= Martin Reef =

Martin Reef (67°34′S 65°31′E) is a reef awash, lying 7 nautical miles (13 km) north of the coast of Antarctica and slightly west of Cape Fletcher. This reef was apparently encountered by Captain Carl Sjovold in the Norwegian whale catcher Bouvet III in January 1931, and by the British Australian New Zealand Antarctic Research Expedition under Douglas Mawson in February 1931. It was named by Mawson for the boatswain of the Discovery.
