= Nerlerit Inaat Airport =

Airport in Sermersooq, Greenland

Nerlerit Inaat Airport Mittarfik Nerlerit Inaat
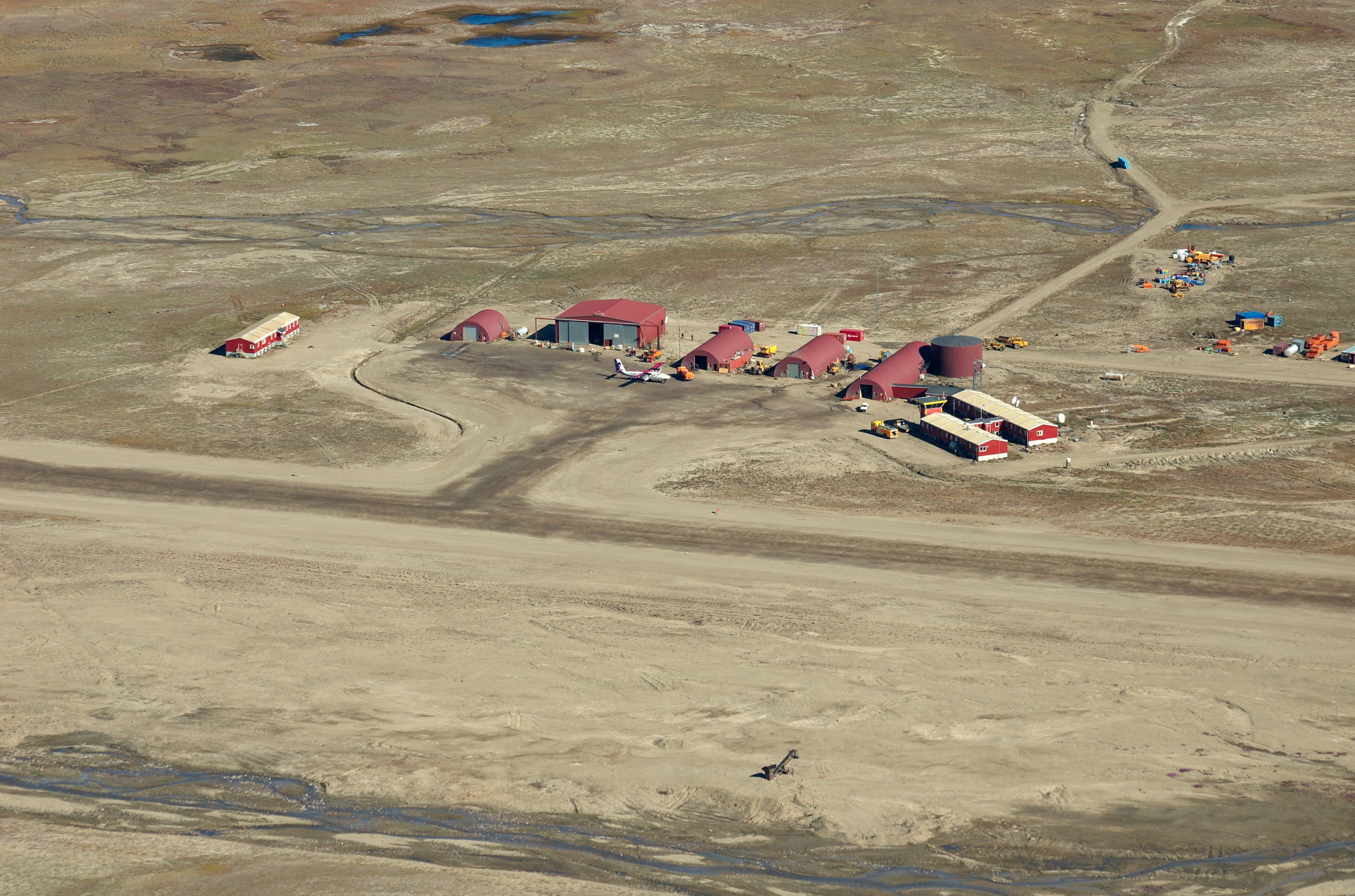
- IATA: CNP; ICAO: BGCO

Summary
- Operator: Greenland Airport Authority (Mittarfeqarfiit)
- Serves: Ittoqqortoormiit
- Elevation AMSL: 45 ft (14 m)
- Coordinates: 70°44′35″N 022°39′02″W
- Website: Nerlerit Inaat lufthavn

Map
- Location in Greenland

Runways
| Direction | Length | | Surface |
| Direction | m | ft | Surface |
|---|---|---|---|
| 18/36 | 1,000 | 3,281 | Gravel |

Statistics (2012)
- Passengers: 3,547
- Source: Danish AIS

Nerlerit Inaat Airport (Greenlandic: Mittarfik Nerlerit Inaat, Danish: Constable Pynt Lufthavn; IATA: CNP, ICAO: BGCO), also referred to as Constable Point Airport, is an airport in the Sermersooq municipality in eastern Greenland. It is located on Jameson Land and serves the town of Ittoqqortoormiit, approximately 40 km (25 mi) to the south-east. The airport can serve STOL aircraft. An AS 350 helicopter of Air Greenland is permanently housed at the airport, linking it with Ittoqqortoormiit Heliport. The helicopter also provides search and rescue capabilities within the surrounding area, and can be chartered for transport.

== History ==
The airport was built in 1985 by the US oil company ARCO in connection with oil exploration in Jameson Land. It was sold to Greenland in 1990. Previously, Air Greenland offered fixed wing flights to Kangerlussuaq and Nuuk.

In summer 2004 the airport was the destination of an arctic trip by two German microlight pilots flying a Flight Design CT2K light aircraft.

On July 28, 2021, in Nerlerit Inaat Airport, a temperature of 23.2 °C (73.8 °F) was recorded.

The relocation of the airport to a new site on Liverpool Land closer to Ittoqqortoormiit, between the settlement and Uunarteq cape (Danish: Kap Tobin) to the south has been considered since the 2000s. This would eliminate the need for helicopter transfers. In 2025, a decision was made to construct an airport in Ittoqqortoormiit, financed by the Danish state.

== Operations ==
The airport has around 15 employees, who have their home within the airport area. No other settlement is reachable by road, making the airport possibly the one with smallest population reachable by road in the world. There is a road to a seaport around 2 km south of the terminal building, and some other roads in the area. Transportation to the main settlement in the area (Ittoqqortoormiit) is by helicopter or (in the summer) by boat .

The airport acts as stopping off point for a number of expeditions into Jameson Land and Northeast Greenland National Park. Areas such as Renland have only just been visited, or have had no known visitors.

== Airlines and destinations ==
| Airlines | Destinations |
|---|---|
| Air Greenland | Ittoqqortoormiit |
| Norlandair | Akureyri, Reykjavik |
