= Strahan Glacier =

Glacier in Antarctica

- Location within Antarctica
- Location: Mac. Robertson Land
- Coordinates: 67°38′S 64°37′E
- Thickness: unknown
- Status: unknown

Strahan Glacier (67°38′S 64°37′E) is a glacier flowing north into the sea 1.5 nautical miles (2.8 km) west of Stevens Rock, midway between Cape Daly and Cape Fletcher, Antarctica. It was discovered in February 1931 by the British Australian New Zealand Antarctic Research Expedition (BANZARE) under Douglas Mawson. Mawson named it for Frank Strahan, Assistant Secretary, Prime Minister's Department (Australia), 1921–35.

== See also ==
- List of glaciers in the Antarctic
- Glaciology
