= Cape Fletcher =

Cape Fletcher (67°41′S 65°35′E) is a minor projection of the ice-covered Antarctic coastline south of Martin Reef, midway between Strahan Glacier and Scullin Monolith. It was discovered by the British Australian New Zealand Antarctic Research Expedition (BANZARE) 1929–31, under Mawson, and named by him for H.O. Fletcher, the assistant biologist for the expedition.
