= Ittoqqortoormiit =

Place in Greenland

Ittoqqortoormiit Illoqqortoormiut (West Greenlandic) Scoresbysund (Danish)
- Town
- View of Ittoqqortoormiit from the sea

- Flag Coat of arms

- Location within Greenland
- Coordinates: 70°29′07″N 21°58′00″W
- State: Kingdom of Denmark
- Constituent country: Greenland
- Municipality: Sermersooq
- Founded: 1925

Population (1 January 2026)
  - Total: 329
- Time zone: UTC−02:00 (WGT)
  - Summer (DST): UTC−01:00 (WGST)
- Postal code: 3980

Ittoqqortoormiit (East Greenlandic [itːɔqːɔtːɔːmːiːt]; West Greenlandic: Illoqqortoormiut [iɬːɔqːɔtːɔːmːiut]; formerly known as Scoresbysund) is a settlement in the Sermersooq municipality in eastern Greenland. Its population was 329 as of 2026, and it has been described as one of the most remote settlements on Earth.

The former name Scoresbysund derives from the English Arctic explorer and whaler William Scoresby, who was the first European to map the area in 1822. The name "Ittoqqortoormiit" means "big house dwellers" in the Eastern Greenlandic dialect. The region is known for its wildlife, including polar bears, muskoxen, and seals.

== Geography ==
Ittoqqortoormiit is located on Liverpool Land, east of Hurry Inlet near the mouth of the northern shore of the Kangertittivaq fjord, which empties into the Greenland Sea.

The nearest other settlement in Greenland is Kulusuk, 831 kilometres (516 mi) away. The nearest other settlement is Sandvík, Grímsey, Iceland, 466 kilometres (290 mi) away.

The time zone in Ittoqqortoormiit is UTC-02:00, the same as most of Greenland's population. Until 2023, it had previously been two hours ahead of most of Greenland.

== History ==
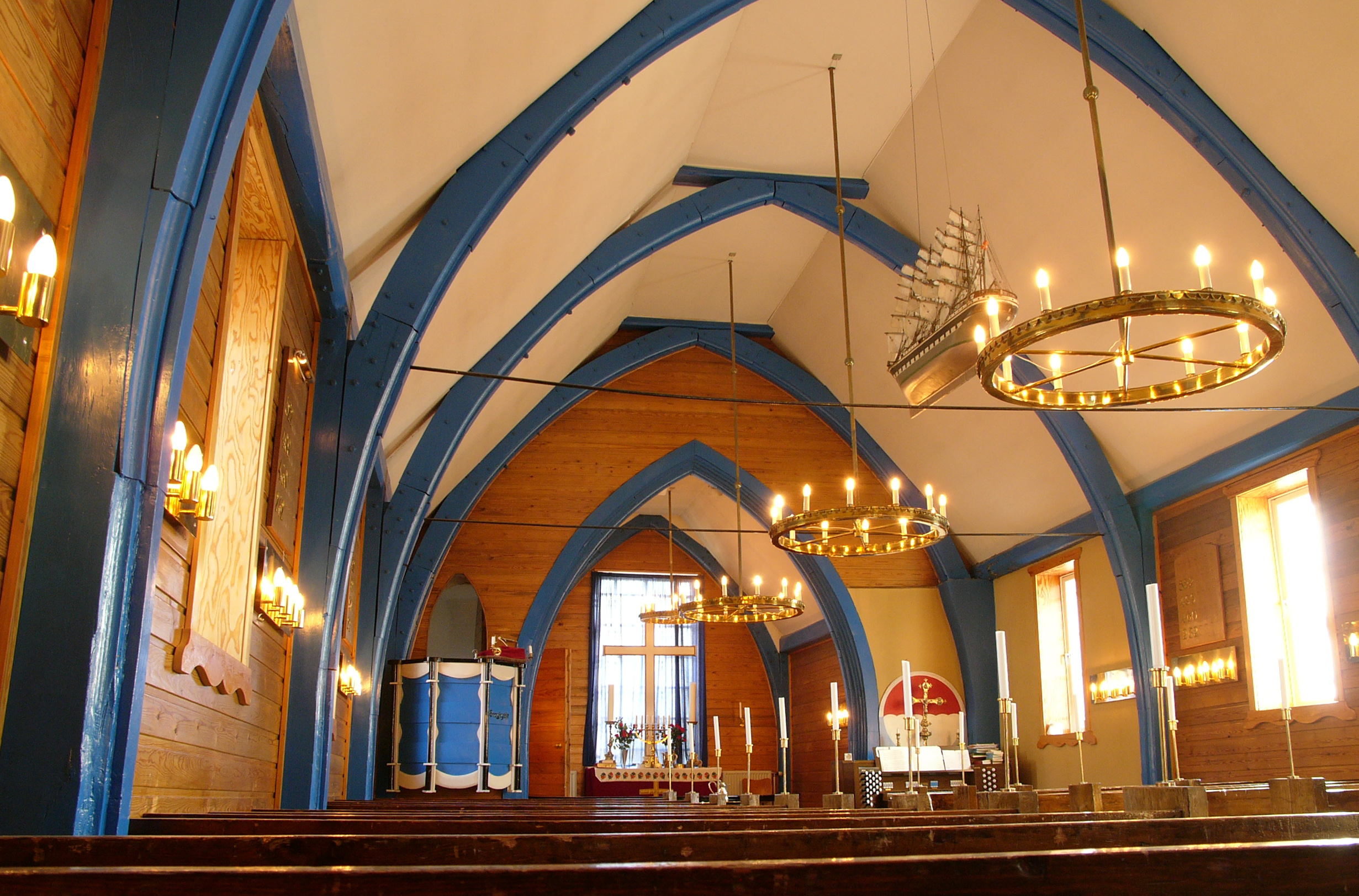
Inside Ittoqqortoormiit Church

Ittoqqortoormiit was founded in 1925 by Ejnar Mikkelsen and some 80 Inuit settlers (70 persons from Tasiilaq and four families from western Greenland). They were brought on the ship Gustav Holm and settled 400 kilometres (249 miles) south of the last known Inuit settlement in northeastern Greenland (Eskimonæs at Dødemandsbugten on the south coast of Clavering Ø, 27 km (17 miles) southwest of later Daneborg, 1823).

The settlement was encouraged by the colonial power Denmark, which at the time had a growing interest in Northeast Greenland. At the same time, the colonization was intended to improve declining living conditions in Tasiilaq, from where the settlers were more or less voluntarily transferred. The settlers soon prospered thanks to the good hunting conditions in the new area, which was rich in seals, walruses, narwhals, polar bears and Arctic foxes.

Before that, the area itself had been home to a dense population of Inuit in the past, as testified by ruins and other archeological remains.

Ittoqqortoormiit Municipality was a former municipality of Greenland. It is now part of Sermersooq Municipality.

Starting on 30 October 2023, the area was moved from East Greenland Time to West Greenland Time, one hour ahead.

== Economy ==
Ittoqqortoormiit houses

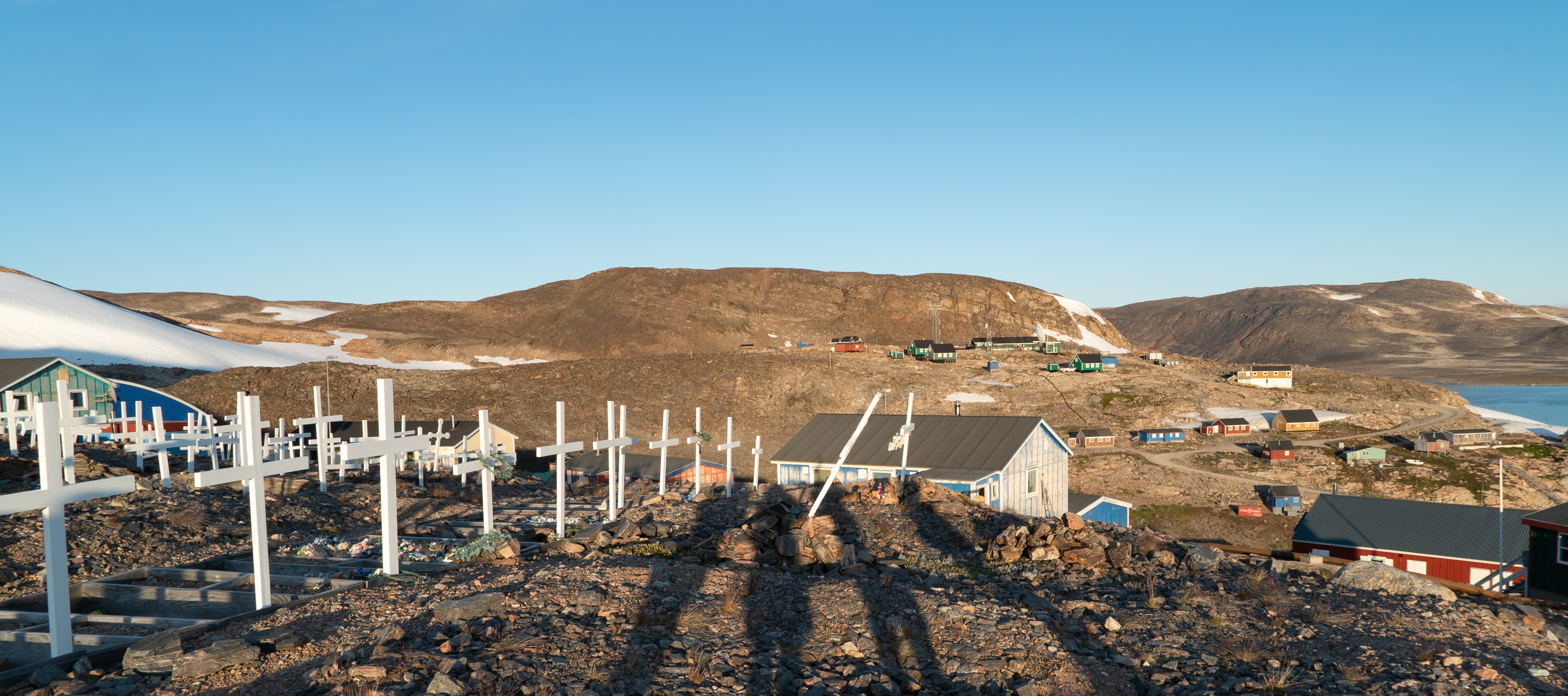
Ittoqqortoormiit Cemetery, 2018

Local hunters have made a living from whale and polar bear hunting for generations, and it remains, up to the present, a significant cultural-economical factor in the area. Meat and by-products play a direct part in the economy of the hunting families. Income is gained by trading these products, but these options are seasonal and variable.

Ittoqqortoormiit lies near large populations of shrimp and Greenland halibut, but the presence of sea ice prevents the exploitation of these resources year-round, and as a result fishing has never been extensively developed in the municipality.

Tourism, on the other hand, is growing in importance because it is of interest to researchers and extreme Arctic expeditions on land and by sea. Ittoqqortoormiit is the closest town in Greenland from Iceland and its ecosystem, hunting culture and remoteness are of interest to a growing number of travelers primarily from Europe. A local company, Nanu Travel, owns the only guest house in the settlement and arranges tours and expedition logistics for visitors. The Guest House was featured in the hotels.com #RemoteAF campaign in 2018 because of its status as one of the most remote hotels on earth. The buildings at the abandoned Uunarteq settlement, also known as Kap Tobin, 7.5 kilometres (4 3/4 miles) south of Ittoqqortoormiit, are used for various purposes all year by the inhabitants of Ittoqqortoormiit.

== Transport ==
Ittoqqortoormiit is one of the most remote towns in Greenland. It is served by Ittoqqortoormiit Heliport, with Air Greenland helicopters shuttling passengers between the settlement and Nerlerit Inaat Airport (38 km (24 mi) distance), with boat transfer also possible for a few months a year. Norlandair operates two weekly flights from Reykjavík Airport and Akureyri Airport to Nerlerit Inaat.

In 2025, a decision was made to construct an airport in Ittoqqortoormiit, financed by the Danish state. This will eliminate the need for helicopter transfers and the use of Nerlerit Inaat Airport.

Ittoqqortoormiit Museum

== Climate ==
Ittoqqortoormiit features a tundra climate (Köppen ET) with cold winters, chilly summers and no monthly average close to the 10 °C (50 °F) threshold that would allow tree growth. It has an average annual temperature of −5.0 °C (23.0 °F).

In the afternoon of 22 February 2005, the time of year that is normally the coldest, the temperature in the village briefly reached +15.9 °C (60.6 °F) due to a combination of exceptionally warm airmasses and a strong foehn effect. This is only 5.1 °C (9.2 °F) different from the all-time record high and surpasses the record high of September, the fourth-warmest month.

Climate data for Ittoqqortoormiit, Greenland (1991–2020 normals)
Month	Jan	Feb	Mar	Apr	May	Jun	Jul	Aug	Sep	Oct	Nov	Dec	Year
Record high °C (°F)	13.5 (56.3)	15.9 (60.6)	6.4 (43.5)	9.2 (48.6)	9.5 (49.1)	17.7 (63.9)	18.5 (65.3)	21.0 (69.8)	13.0 (55.4)	8.9 (48.0)	9.7 (49.5)	7.5 (45.5)	21.0 (69.8)
Mean daily maximum °C (°F)	−9.4 (15.1)	−10.2 (13.6)	−9.7 (14.5)	−4.8 (23.4)	0.8 (33.4)	6.1 (43.0)	9.4 (48.9)	8.6 (47.5)	3.9 (39.0)	−2.3 (27.9)	−6.3 (20.7)	−8.8 (16.2)	−1.9 (28.6)
Daily mean °C (°F)	−12.9 (8.8)	−13.5 (7.7)	−13.2 (8.2)	−8.5 (16.7)	−2.1 (28.2)	2.8 (37.0)	6.0 (42.8)	5.6 (42.1)	1.5 (34.7)	−4.6 (23.7)	−9.2 (15.4)	−12.0 (10.4)	−5.0 (23.0)
Mean daily minimum °C (°F)	−16.2 (2.8)	−17.1 (1.2)	−17.1 (1.2)	−12.6 (9.3)	−5.2 (22.6)	−0.2 (31.6)	2.6 (36.7)	2.7 (36.9)	−0.7 (30.7)	−6.8 (19.8)	−11.9 (10.6)	−15.3 (4.5)	−8.1 (17.3)
Record low °C (°F)	−36.9 (−34.4)	−36.6 (−33.9)	−40.5 (−40.9)	−33.5 (−28.3)	−18.3 (−0.9)	−7.1 (19.2)	−3.5 (25.7)	−3.5 (25.7)	−8.0 (17.6)	−19.3 (−2.7)	−25.1 (−13.2)	−30.0 (−22.0)	−40.5 (−40.9)
Average precipitation mm (inches)	63.2 (2.49)	62.6 (2.46)	42.4 (1.67)	26.8 (1.06)	20.3 (0.80)	12.0 (0.47)	28.3 (1.11)	37.3 (1.47)	68.0 (2.68)	56.1 (2.21)	42.7 (1.68)	57.1 (2.25)	516.8 (20.35)
Average precipitation days (≥ 1.0 mm)	6	7	6	5	3	3	5	5	5	4	6	5	66
Mean monthly sunshine hours	1	31	108	205	251	291	278	229	142	71	8	0	1,583
Source 1: Danish Meteorological Institute (sun 1982–1999)
Source 2: NOAA (precipitation days 1961–1990)

== Population ==
The population of Ittoqqortoormiit has fluctuated over the past three decades, decreasing about 35% since 2006.

View chart definition.

Ittoqqortoormiit population dynamics. 1991–2020. Source: Statistics Greenland

== International relations ==
Ittoqqortoormiit is twinned with:

- Aalborg, Denmark
