= Liverpool Land =

Peninsula in eastern Greenland

Coordinates: 70°55′N 22°12′W

Location within Greenland

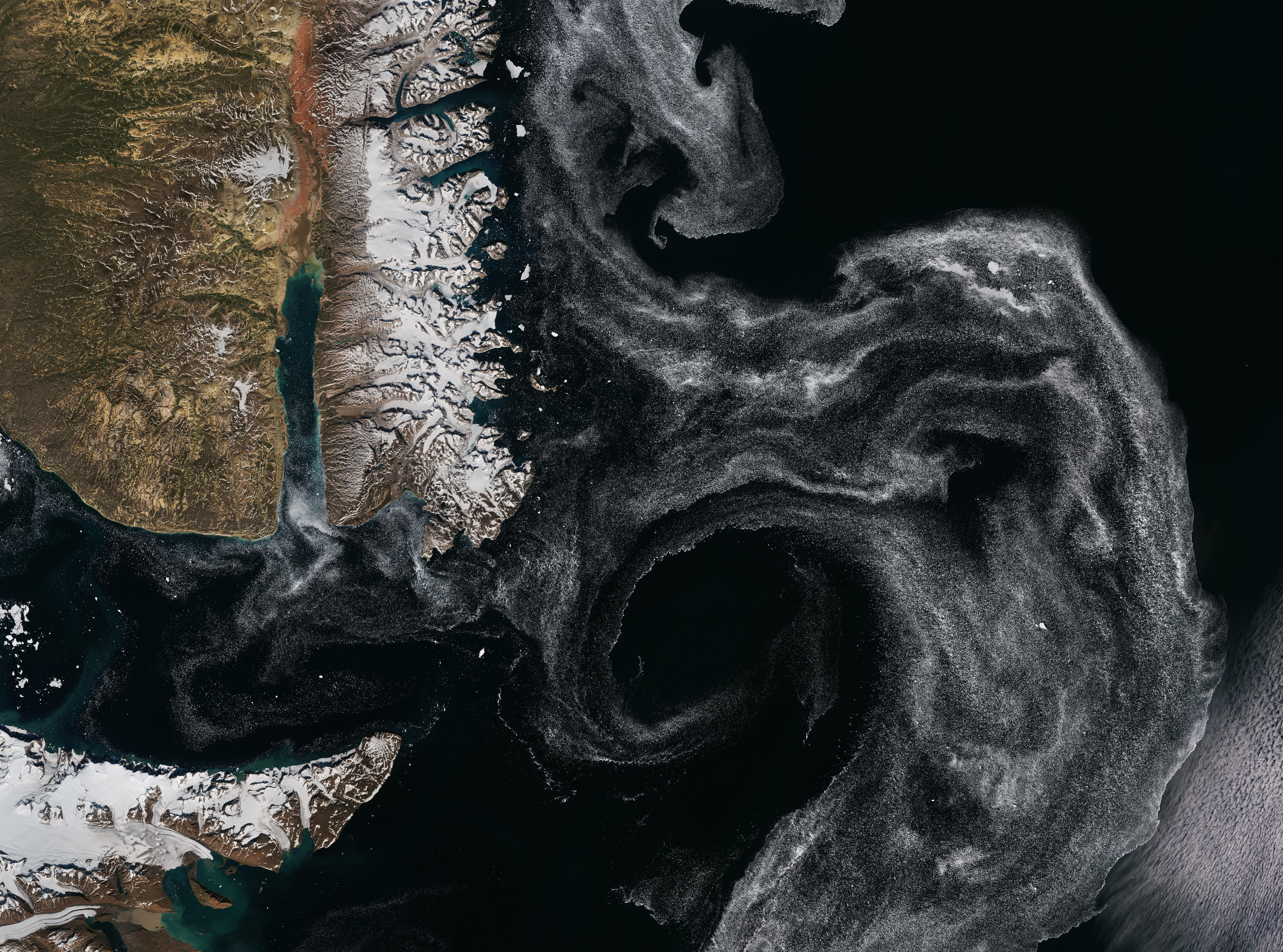
The Liverpool Land peninsula, on the east coast of Greenland, is featured in this Copernicus Sentinel-2 image. The peninsula is visible at the top partially covered with snow.

Liverpool Land is a peninsula in eastern Greenland.

== Geography ==
The peninsula is bounded by Scoresby Sund in the south, Carlsberg Fjord in the northwest, Kangerterajiva (Hurry Inlet) in the southwest, the Greenland Sea in the east, and Jameson Land in the west. It was named by William Scoresby, who thought that Hurry Inlet had a confluence with Carlsberg Fjord, separating Liverpool Land from Jameson Land. The fjord-rich peninsula is 125 km (78 mi) long from Kap Greville in the north to Uunarteq (Danish: Kap Tobin) in the south, up to 40 km (25 mi) wide, and measures about 3,000 km^{2} (1,200 mi^{2}) in area. It is connected to Jameson Land over a length of 35 km (22 mi).

A large part of Liverpool Land is mountainous, the Didrik Pining Range and the Heywood Range are located in the peninsula. Warming Island is located approximately 700 m (2,300 ft) off the northeastern tip of Liverpool Land. Storefjord indents the peninsula from the east about 25 km (16 mi), almost cutting it into two.

The southern coast of Liverpool Land is the location of the town of Ittoqqortoormiit and of the abandoned settlements of Itterajivit, and Uunarteq at the southernmost tip of Liverpool Land.

== Transport ==
Access to the region is gained through the Nerlerit Inaat Airport, with scheduled services to Reykjavík in Iceland and Kulusuk in southeastern Greenland, operated by Icelandair.

== See also ==
- Milne Land
- Renland
- Scoresby Land
