= Uunarteq =

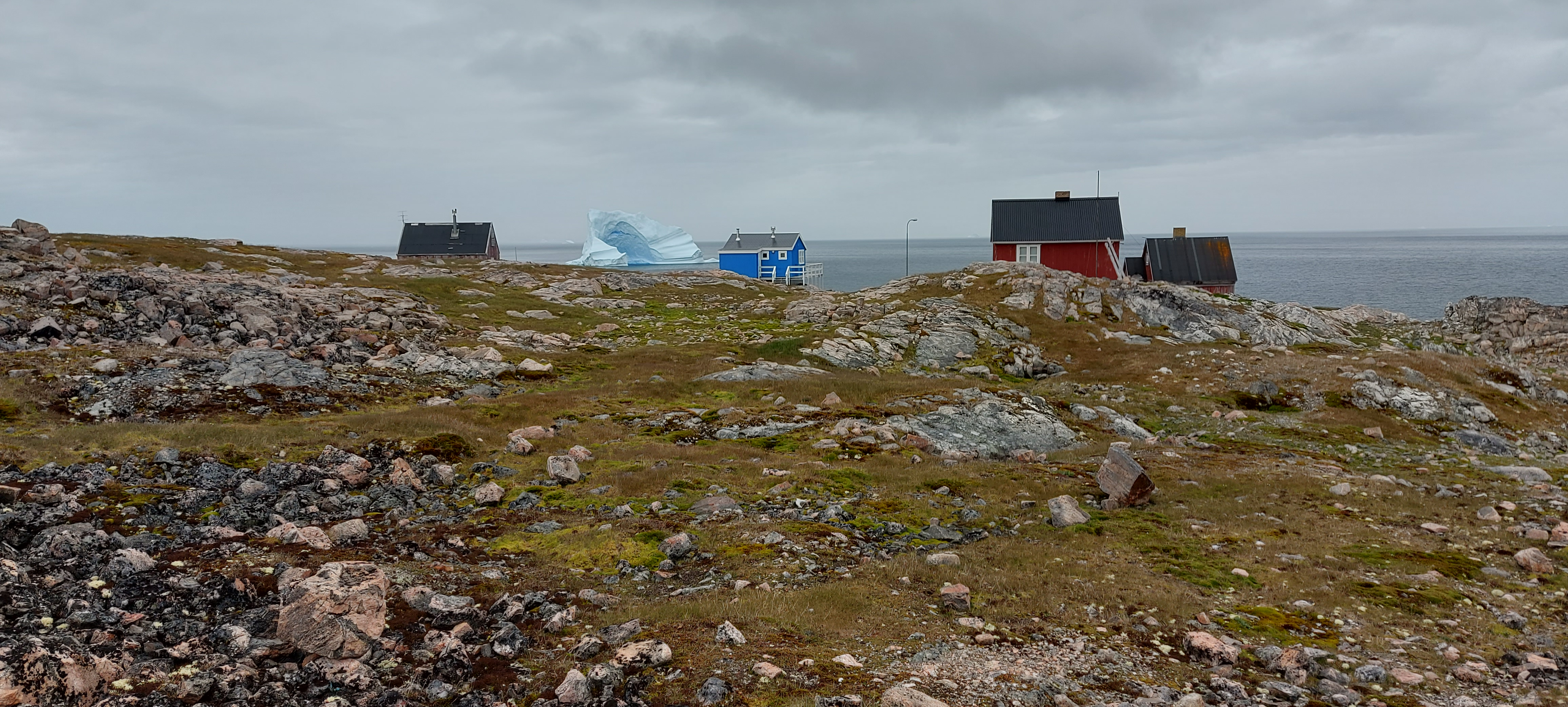
- The abandoned village of Uunarteq

- Location within Greenland
- Coordinates: 70°25′08″N 21°58′20″W
- State: Kingdom of Denmark
- Constituent country: Greenland
- Municipality: Sermersooq
- Founded: 1926
- Abandoned: 1980s
- Time zone: UTC-01

Uunarteq, formerly Kap Tobin and Unarteg, is an abandoned settlement in the Sermersooq municipality in eastern Greenland, located 7 km (4.3 mi) south of Ittoqqortoormiit.

== History ==
The settlement was founded by fishermen and their families in 1926. In 1947 a telegraph and weather station were erected; the station itself employed roughly 20 people. At its largest extent, the settlement was home for approximately 120 people, with its own grade school. The village housed a seismic station until 1960, when it was closed down. Uunarteq was abandoned as a settlement in the mid-1980s, when the local weather station was closed. Today the remaining buildings serve as cottages for the inhabitants of nearby Ittoqqortoormiit. The last family left the settlement in 2004.

== Climate ==
The place of the outlying village has a tundra climate (Köppen: ET), like most coastal places in Greenland, where temperatures above zero can remain on average in the summer months, although much of the year is like a long winter.

Climate data for Uunarteq (north), elevation: 41 m, 1961-1990 normals (Note: Except for precipitation days and fall (snow and rain) that have the measurement period of 1961-1980 (20 years).)
Month	Jan	Feb	Mar	Apr	May	Jun	Jul	Aug	Sep	Oct	Nov	Dec	Year
Mean daily maximum °C (°F)	−12.0 (10.4)	−12.7 (9.1)	−12.2 (10.0)	−7.1 (19.2)	−0.4 (31.3)	3.7 (38.7)	6.5 (43.7)	6.5 (43.7)	2.0 (35.6)	−3.9 (25.0)	−9.2 (15.4)	−11.0 (12.2)	−4.1 (24.5)
Daily mean °C (°F)	−16.1 (3.0)	−17.1 (1.2)	−16.5 (2.3)	−11.3 (11.7)	−3.6 (25.5)	1.1 (34.0)	3.3 (37.9)	3.5 (38.3)	−0.3 (31.5)	−6.3 (20.7)	−12.2 (10.0)	−14.6 (5.7)	−7.5 (18.5)
Mean daily minimum °C (°F)	−20.5 (−4.9)	−21.7 (−7.1)	−21.0 (−5.8)	−15.6 (3.9)	−6.7 (19.9)	−1.1 (30.0)	0.8 (33.4)	1.0 (33.8)	−2.4 (27.7)	−8.6 (16.5)	−15.3 (4.5)	−18.5 (−1.3)	−10.8 (12.5)
Average precipitation mm (inches)	52.0 (2.05)	39.0 (1.54)	47.0 (1.85)	27.0 (1.06)	27.0 (1.06)	27.0 (1.06)	30.0 (1.18)	48.0 (1.89)	41.0 (1.61)	67.0 (2.64)	42.0 (1.65)	48.0 (1.89)	495 (19.48)
Average precipitation days (≥ 1.0 mm)	9.0	7.0	9.0	6.0	6.0	5.0	4.0	6.0	6.0	8.0	7.0	8.0	81
Average relative humidity (%)	74.0	74.0	73.0	73.0	77.0	80.0	78.0	77.0	75.0	75.0	74.0	74.0	75.3
Source: NOAA

== Places of interest ==
In the area ruins of an early Inuit village can be found. The ruins are located at the nearby hot springs, the average temperature of which is 140 °F (60.0 °C).
