= Sam Cooke discography =

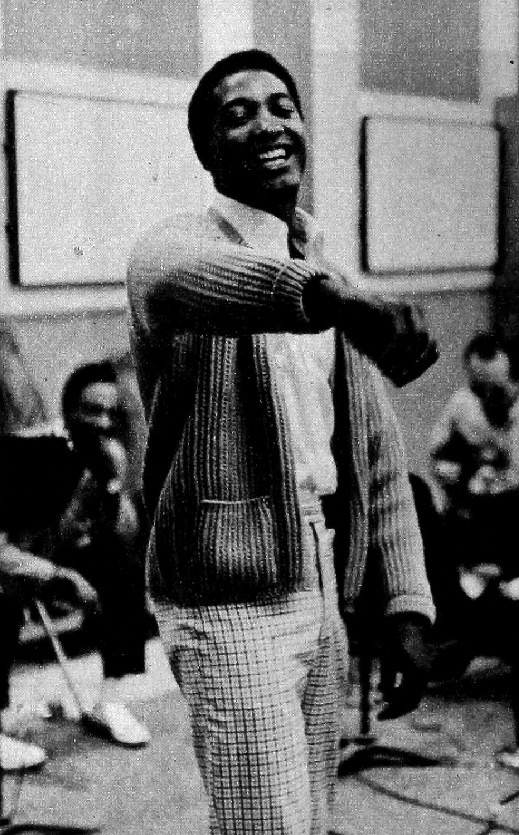
- Studio albums: 14
- Live albums: 2
- Compilation albums: 13
- Singles: 49
- Box sets: 2

The discography of Sam Cooke, an American singer and songwriter, consists of fourteen studio albums (including one collaborative album and two notable posthumous releases), two live albums, 49 singles, 13 compilations and 2 box sets. Over the course of his eight-year career, Cooke placed 29 singles in the Top 40 on the Billboard Pop Singles chart. He also placed 20 singles in the Top Ten of Billboard's R&B chart, Black Singles chart. Between 1957 and 1960, Sam Cooke recorded for Keen Records; from 1960 through 1966, he recorded for RCA Victor.

Ownership of Cooke's material is split between RCA Records (roughly 1958–1963) and ABKCO (post-1963), with each label releasing their own compilations and rarely cross-licensing (The Man and His Music and Portrait of a Legend: 1951–1964 being the two exceptions). As a result, few of Cooke's original albums saw individual reissue on compact disc, and, consequently, digital distribution, although all of Cooke's recorded work has been released in various compilations and in boxed sets.

== Albums ==
=== Studio albums ===
List of studio albums, with selected details and chart positions
Title	Album details	Peak chart positions
Title	Album details	US
Sam Cooke	Released: February 1958; Label: Keen	16
Encore	Released: 1958; Label: Keen	—
Tribute to the Lady	Released: 1959; Label: Keen	—
Cooke's Tour	Released: May 1960; Label: RCA Victor	—
Hits of the 50's	Released: August 1960; Label: RCA Victor	—
Swing Low	Released: February 1961; Label: RCA Victor	—
My Kind of Blues	Released: October 1961; Label: RCA Victor	—
Twistin' the Night Away	Released: April 1962; Label: RCA Victor	74
Mr. Soul	Released: February 1963; Label: RCA Victor	94
Night Beat	Released: August 1963; Label: RCA Victor	62
Ain't That Good News	Released: March 1, 1964; Label: RCA Victor	34
"—" denotes a recording that did not chart or was not released in that territory.

=== Posthumous studio albums ===
List of posthumous studio albums, with selected details and chart positions
Title	Album details	Peak chart positions	
Title	Album details	US	US R&B
Shake	Released: January 1965; Label: RCA Victor	44	1
Try a Little Love	Released: October 1965; Label: RCA Victor	120	—
"—" denotes a recording that did not chart or was not released in that territory.

=== Live albums ===
List of live albums, with selected details and chart positions
Title	Album details	Peak chart positions	
Title	Album details	US	US R&B
Sam Cooke at the Copa	Released: October 1964; Label: RCA Victor	29	1
Live at the Harlem Square Club, 1963	Released: June 1985; Label: RCA Victor	—	—
"—" denotes a recording that did not chart or was not released in that territory.

=== Collaboration albums ===
List of collaboration albums, with selected details
Title	Album details
3 Great Guys	Released: February 1964; Label: RCA Victor

=== Compilation albums ===
Numerous compilation albums and greatest hits collections of Cooke's work have been released, notably Portrait of a Legend: 1951–1964 in 2003. This list compiles the most notable compilation releases from major labels. Many cross-licensed compilations from smaller labels (most of which contain Cooke's gospel work with the Soul Stirrers) are not represented here.

List of compilations, with selected chart positions and certifications
Title	Album details	Peak chart positions			Certifications
Title	Album details	US	US R&B	UK	Certifications
Hit Kit	Released: 1959; Label: Keen	—	—	—	
The Wonderful World of Sam Cooke	Released 1960; Label: Keen	—	—	—	
I Thank God	Released: 1960; Label: Keen	—	—	—	
The Best of Sam Cooke	Released: August 1962; Label: RCA Victor	22	—	—	BPI: Gold
The Best of Sam Cooke, Volume II	Released: July 1965; Label: RCA Victor	128	7	—	
The Unforgettable Sam Cooke	Released: May 1966; Label: RCA Victor	—	—	—	
The One and Only	Released: 1969; Label: RCA Victor	—	—	—	
This Is Sam Cooke	Released: September 1970; Label: RCA Victor	—	—	—	
The Man and His Music	Released: February 1986; Label: RCA Victor	175	—	8	BPI: Gold
The Rhythm and the Blues	Released: October 24, 1995; Label: RCA	—	—	—	
Greatest Hits	Released: February 24, 1998; Label: RCA	—	—	—	
Keep Movin' On	Released: January 15, 2002; Label: ABKCO	—	—	—	
Portrait of a Legend: 1951–1964	Released: June 17, 2003; Label: ABKCO	135	—	19	BPI: Platinum
"—" denotes a recording that did not chart or was not released in that territory.

=== Box sets ===
List of box sets, with selected details
Title	Album details
The Man Who Invented Soul	Released: September 26, 2000; Label: RCA
The RCA Albums Collection	Released: November 22, 2011; Label: RCA/Legacy
The Complete KEEN Years: 1957-1960	Released: January 22, 2020; Label: ABCKO

== Singles ==
List of singles, with selected chart positions and certifications
Title (A-side / B-side)	Year	Peak chart positions				Certifications	Album
Title (A-side / B-side)	Year	US	US R&B	CAN	UK	Certifications	Album
"You Send Me" "Summertime"	1957	1; 81	1 —	1 —	29 —		Sam Cooke (Keen)
"I'll Come Running Back to You" "Forever"	1957	18; 60	1 —	8 —	23 —		Non-album tracks
"(I Love You) For Sentimental Reasons" "Desire Me"	1957	17; 47	15; 17	— —	— —		Non-album track/re-recorded for Mr. Soul Non-album track
"That's All I Need to Know" "I Don't Want to Cry"	1958	— —	— —	41 —	— —		Non-album tracks
"You Were Made for Me" "Lonely Island"	1958	27; 26	7; 10	— 16	— —		Non-album tracks
"Stealing Kisses" "All of My Life"	1958	— —	— —	— —	— —		Non-album tracks
"Win Your Love for Me" "Love Song from Houseboat (Almost in Your Arms)"	1958	22 —	4 —	45 —	— —		Non-album tracks
"Blue Moon" "Love You Most of All" (Note: The single "Blue Moon"/"Love You Most of All" was reissued one month following its initial release on the same catalog number, with the A and B sides switched.)	1958	— 26	— 12	— 24	— —		Non-album track
"I Need You Now" "Happy in Love"	1959	— —	— —	— —	— —		Non-album tracks
"Everybody Loves to Cha Cha Cha" "Little Things You Do"	1959	31 —	2 —	14 —	— —		Non-album tracks
"Only Sixteen" "Let's Go Steady Again"	1959	28 —	13 —	21 —	23 —		Non-album tracks
"Summertime (Part 1)" "Summertime (Part 2)"	1959	— 106	— —	— —	— —		Non-album track Sam Cooke (Keen)
"There, I've Said It Again" "One Hour Ahead of the Posse"	1959	81 —	25 —	— —	— —		Non-album tracks
"Mary, Mary Lou" "Ee-Yi-Ee-Yi-Oh"	1960	— —	— —	— —	— —		Encore; Non-album track
"T'Aint Nobody's Bizness" "No One (Can Ever Take Your Place)"	1960	— 103	— —	— —	— —		Tribute to the Lady Non-album track
"Teenage Sonata" "If You Were the Only Girl"	1960	50 —	22 —	30; 30	— —		Non-album tracks
"You Understand Me" "I Belong to Your Heart"	1960	— —	— —	— —	— —		Non-album tracks
"Wonderful World" "Along the Navajo Trail"	1960	12 —	2 —	13 —	27 —		Non-album track Encore
"With You" "I Thank God"	1960	— —	— —	— —	— —		Non-album track I Thank God
"Chain Gang" "I Fall in Love Every Day"	1960	2 —	2 —	4 —	9 —		Swing Low Non-album track
"So Glamorous" "Steal Away"	1960	81 —	25 —	— —	— —		Non-album tracks
"Sad Mood" "Love Me"	1960	29 —	23 —	18 —	— —		Non-album tracks
"That's It, I Quit, I'm Movin' On" "What Do You Say"	1961	31 —	25 —	25 —	— —		Twistin' the Night Away; Non-album track
"Cupid" "Farewell, My Darling"	1961	17 —	20 —	— —	7 —		Non-album tracks
"Feel It" "It's All Right"	1961	56; 93	— —	— —	— —		Non-album tracks
"Just for You" "Made for Me"	1961	— —	— —	— —	— —		Non-album tracks
"Twistin' the Night Away" "One More Time"	1962	9 —	1 —	35 —	6 —	BPI: Silver	Twistin' the Night Away Non-album track
"Twistin' in the Kitchen with Dinah" "A Whole Lotta Woman"	1962	— —	— —	— —	— —		Twistin' the Night Away
"Bring It On Home to Me" "Having a Party"	1962	13; 17	2; 4	— 30	— —		Non-album tracks
"Nothing Can Change This Love" "Somebody Have Mercy"	1962	12; 70	2; 3	— —	— —		Mr. Soul; Twistin' the Night Away
"Send Me Some Lovin'" "Baby, Baby, Baby"	1962	13; 66	2 —	— —	— —		Mr. Soul Non-album track
"Another Saturday Night" "Love Will Find a Way"	1963	10; 105	1 —	30 —	23 —		Ain't That Good News Non-album track
"Frankie and Johnny" "Cool Train"	1963	14 —	4 —	— —	30 —		Non-album tracks
"Little Red Rooster" "You Gotta Move"	1963	11 —	7 —	— —	— —		Night Beat
"Good News" "Basin Street Blues"	1964	11 —	(Note: Through a period between late 1963 and early 1965, Billboard did not publish an R&B singles chart.)	— —	— —		Ain't That Good News Non-album track
"Good Times" "Tennessee Waltz"	1964	11; 35		22 —	— —		Ain't That Good News
"That's Where It's At" "Cousin of Mine"	1964	93; 31	— 40	— 29	— —		Non-album track
"—" denotes a recording that did not chart or was not released in that territory.

=== Posthumous singles ===
List of singles, with selected chart positions and certifications
Title (A-side / B-side)	Year	Peak chart positions				Certifications	Album
Title (A-side / B-side)	Year	US	US R&B	CAN	UK	Certifications	Album
"Shake" "A Change Is Gonna Come"	1964	7; 31	2; 9	— —	— —	BPI: Gold	Shake; Ain't That Good News
"Another Saturday Night" "Send Me Some Lovin'"	1965	— —	— —	— —	— —		Ain't That Good News; Mr. Soul
"It's Got The Whole World Shakin'" "(Somebody) Ease My Troublin' Mind"	1965	41; 115	15 —	29 —	— —		Shake
"When a Boy Falls in Love" "The Piper"	1965	52 —	— —	15 —	— —		Try a Little Love; Non-album track
"Sugar Dumpling" "Bridge of Tears"	1965	32 —	18 —	— —	— —		The Unforgettable Sam Cooke; Try a Little Love
"Feel It" "That's All"	1966	— —	— —	— —	— —		The Unforgettable Sam Cooke
"Let's Go Steady Again" "Trouble Blues"	1966	97 —	— —	— —	— —		Hit Kit; Night Beat
"Meet Me at Mary's Place" "If I Had a Hammer"	1966	— —	— —	— —	— —		Ain't That Good News; Sam Cooke at the Copa
"The Last Mile of the Way" "Must Jesus Bear the Cross Alone" (Note: This release is credited to Sam Cooke with the Soul Stirrers.)	1970	— —	— —	— —	— —		The Two Sides of Sam Cooke; The Gospel Soul of Sam Cooke with the Soul Stirrers, Volume 1
"Bring It On Home to Me" "Nothing Can Change This Love"	1985	— —	— —	— —	— —	BPI: Silver	Sam Cooke Live at the Harlem Square Club, 1963
"Wonderful World" "Chain Gang"	1986	— —	— —	— —	2 —	BPI: Silver	Sam Cooke, The Man and His Music
"Another Saturday Night" "You Send Me"	1986	— —	— —	— —	75 —		Sam Cooke, The Man and His Music
"—" denotes a recording that did not chart or was not released in that territory.

=== Billboard Year-End performances ===
Year	Song	Year-End Position
1957	"You Send Me"	20
1960	"Chain Gang"	29
1960	"Wonderful World"	80
1962	"Twistin' the Night Away"	23
1962	"Having a Party"	52
1963	"Little Red Rooster"	67
1963	"Another Saturday Night"	88
1965	"Shake"	66
