= The Best of Sam Cooke =

Greatest hits album by Sam Cooke
- Released: 1962
- Genres: Rhythm and blues, dance, soul
- Length: 31:50
- Label: RCA Victor
- Producer: Hugo & Luigi

Sam Cooke chronology
Twistin' the Night Away (1962)	The Best of Sam Cooke (1962)	Mr. Soul (1963)

Singles from The Best of Sam Cooke
- 1. "Bring It On Home to Me" Released: May 8, 1962

Professional ratings
Review scores
Source	Rating
AllMusic	3.5/5 stars
Blender	1/5 stars
The Rolling Stone Record Guide	5/5 stars

The Best of Sam Cooke is the second greatest hits album by American singer-songwriter Sam Cooke. Produced by Hugo & Luigi, the album was released in 1962 in the United States by RCA Victor. The compilation contains most of Sam Cooke's popular hits from 1957 to 1962.

== Critical reception ==
AllMusic critic Ron Wynn gave The Best of Sam Cooke three-and-a-half out of five stars and called it "an above-average greatest hits collection, although no sampler could fully convey Sam Cooke's genius." In Blender, Robert Christgau was more critical, giving it one star and recommending listeners overlook the album in favor of the 30-song compilation Portrait of a Legend: 1951–1964.

== Track listing ==
All tracks written by Sam Cooke except side one, track 4 (William Best and Deek Watson), side one, track 5 (Sam Cooke, Lou Adler and Herb Alpert), side one, track 6 (George Gershwin and DuBose Heyward) and side two, track 1 (Sam Cooke and Charles Cook, Jr.).

=== Side one ===
1. "You Send Me" – 2:45
2. "Only Sixteen" – 2:02
3. "Everybody Loves to Cha Cha Cha" – 2:42
4. "(I Love You) For Sentimental Reasons" – 2:38
5. "Wonderful World" – 2:06
6. "Summertime" – 2:21

=== Side two ===
1. "Chain Gang" – 2:35
2. "Cupid" – 2:37
3. "Twistin' the Night Away" – 2:43
4. "Sad Mood" – 2:38
5. "Having a Party" – 2:36
6. "Bring It On Home to Me" – 2:44

=== 2005 CD Bonus Tracks ===
1. "Win Your Love for Me" – 2:46
2. "You Were Made for Me" – 2:54
3. "Nothing Can Change This Love" – 2:36

== Personnel ==
- Sam Cooke – vocals
- Lou Rawls – back-up vocals

== Reissues ==
In 1979, RCA reissued the album in its mid-priced "Pure Gold" album series with revised catalog number ANL1-3466. The album was reissued again in 1981 in the RCA budget-priced "Best-Buy" series, catalog number changed to AYL1-3863. RCA first reissued the album on compact disc in 1988; this reissue included an alternate version of "Summertime" as a bonus track. The album was reissued again on CD in 2005, with three bonus tracks. In 2018, Sony/RCA reissued the album in its original vinyl format as part of the RCA Legacy Recordings series.
