= Portrait of a Legend: 1951–1964 =

Compilation album by Sam Cooke
- Released: June 17, 2003
- Recorded: March 1, 1951 – November 16, 1964; Various recording locations
- Genres: Rhythm and blues; soul
- Length: 79:08
- Label: ABKCO
- Producers: Sam Cooke; Hugo & Luigi; René Hall; Al Schmitt; Art Rupe; Lou Adler; Bumps Blackwell

Sam Cooke chronology
Keep Movin' On (2002)	Portrait of a Legend: 1951–1964 (2003)	The RCA Albums Collection (2011)

Portrait of a Legend: 1951–1964 is a compilation album by American singer-songwriter Sam Cooke, released posthumously on June 17, 2003, by ABKCO Records. The disc covers Cooke's entire career, from his early 1950s beginnings with the Soul Stirrers to the posthumous 1964 single "Shake". The collection includes most of the singer's hit singles, including "You Send Me", "Wonderful World", "Chain Gang", "Cupid", "Twistin' the Night Away", "Bring It On Home to Me", "Another Saturday Night", "Little Red Rooster", "Ain't That Good News", "Good Times", and what is often regarded as Cooke's magnum opus, "A Change Is Gonna Come".

The compilation is generally considered the most complete and comprehensive collection of Cooke's work. It has been included on various "best-of" lists by music publications, including Rolling Stone and Time.

== Reception ==
Professional ratings
Review scores
Source	Rating
AllMusic	5/5 stars

Biographer Peter Guralnick, author of Cooke's biography Dream Boogie and the liner notes for the disc, writes: "For an overview of Sam's career, from his gospel beginnings through 'A Change Is Gonna Come,' nothing can compare to Portrait of a Legend which serves as a guide to Sam at his very best." The BBC's Alwyn Turner writes, "With perfect sound quality, and with sleeve-notes by Peter Guralnick, this is the best single-volume introduction to his work available." Bruce Eder of AllMusic considered it an improvement on the 1986 compilation The Man and His Music in terms of running time and audio quality; he did, however, lament the lack of inclusion of "'That's Heaven to Me' and 'Soothe Me', arguably one of Cooke's most important songs."

It is Cooke's highest placing position on Rolling Stone's 2003 list of the 500 Greatest Albums of All-Time, at number 107, maintaining the rating in a 2012 revised list, dropping to number 307 in a 2020 revised list. In 2010, Time included the compilation on their list of the All-TIME 100 Albums, covering "the 100 greatest and most influential musical compilations since 1954." In the article, Alan Light writes, "The 31 tracks on Portrait of a Legend impressively capture Cooke’s range on a single disc […] Many artists are called "legends," but Sam Cooke truly earned this title."

== Track listing ==
All tracks are written by Sam Cooke, except where noted.

No.	Title	Writer	Length
1.	"Touch the Hem of His Garment"		2:01
2.	"Lovable"	Cooke; Tony Harris	2:24
3.	"You Send Me"		2:43
4.	"Only Sixteen"		2:02
5.	"(I Love You) For Sentimental Reasons"	Derek Watson; William Best	2:38
6.	"Just for You"		2:19
7.	"Win Your Love for Me"	L.C. Cook	2:46
8.	"Everybody Loves to Cha Cha Cha"		2:45
9.	"I'll Come Running Back to You"	William "Bill" Cook	2:13
10.	"You Were Made for Me"		2:53
11.	"Sad Mood"		2:39
12.	"Cupid"		2:36
13.	"(What a) Wonderful World"	Cooke; Lou Adler; Herb Alpert	2:05
14.	"Chain Gang"	Cooke; Charles Cook Jr.	2:34
15.	"Summertime"	George Gershwin; Ira Gershwin; DuBose Heyward	2:20
16.	"Little Red Rooster"	Willie Dixon	2:52
17.	"Bring It On Home to Me"		2:42
18.	"Nothing Can Change This Love"		2:37
19.	"Sugar Dumpling"		2:43
20.	"(Ain't That) Good News"		2:28
21.	"Meet Me at Mary's Place"		2:41
22.	"Twistin' the Night Away"		2:41
23.	"Shake"		2:50
24.	"Tennessee Waltz"	Pee Wee King; Redd Stewart	3:09
25.	"Another Saturday Night"		2:40
26.	"Good Times"		2:27
27.	"Having a Party"		2:35
28.	"That's Where It's At"	Cooke; J. W. Alexander	2:35
29.	"A Change Is Gonna Come"		3:11
30.	"Jesus Gave Me Water"	Lucie Campbell	2:29
Total length:			79:08

There is an additional track containing a segment of an interview by Magnificent Montague from 1963 in which Sam Cooke hums a few bars.

== Personnel ==
All credits adapted from the disc's liner notes.

- Sam Cooke – vocals, producer
- Michael Gochanour – analog to digital transfers
- Rick Essig – analog to digital transfers
- Teri Landi – analog to digital transfers
- Ben Bailes – assistant engineer
- Matt Boynton – assistant engineer
- Tom Camuso – assistant engineer
- Jimmie Haskell – arrangement, conducting
- René Hall – arrangement, conducting, guitar, producer
- Alisa Coleman-Ritz – art direction
- Iris W. Keitel – art direction
- April Hobbs – art production coordinator
- Seth Adkins – art production coordinator
- Laura Walton – audio production coordinator
- Alicia Adams – backing vocals
- Betty Baker – backing vocals
- Betty Jane Barker – backing vocals
- Carol Lee Lombard – backing vocals
- Charles Parlato – backing vocals
- Doreen Tryden – backing vocals
- Jack Halloran – backing vocals
- Jackie Ward – backing vocals
- James Bryant – backing vocals
- J.J. Farley – backing vocals
- Jimmie Outler – backing vocals
- Lee Gotch – backing vocals
- Loulie Jean Norman – backing vocals
- Lou Rawls – backing vocals
- Paul Foster – backing vocals
- R.B. Robinson – backing vocals
- Ralph Brewster – backing vocals
- Richard Gibbs – backing vocals
- Robert Tebold – backing vocals
- Sally Stevens Castle – backing vocals
- S.R. Crain – backing vocals
- Sue Allen – backing vocals
- Thomas D. Kenny – backing vocals
- Thomas L. Bruster – backing vocals
- Adolphus Alsbrook – bass guitar
- Chuck Badie – bass guitar
- Clifford Hils – bass guitar
- Eddie Tilman – bass guitar
- Frank Fields – bass guitar
- Harper Cosby – bass guitar
- James Bond – bass guitar
- Milton Hinton – bass guitar
- Ray Pohlman – bass guitar
- Red Callender – bass guitar
- Ted Brinson – bass guitar
- Jack Costanza – bongos
- Armand Kaproff – cello
- Cecil Figelski – cello
- Emmet Sargeant – cello
- Frederick Seykora – cello
- Jesse Ehrlich – cello

- Joseph Coppin – cello
- Leanne Allik – conception
- Glen Osser – conductor
- Sammy Lowe – conductor
- Angelo Tillery – cover illustration
- Hiroyuki Komuro – DSD assistant
- Gus Skinas – DSD
- Charles Blackwell – drums
- David Francis – drums
- Earl Palmer – drums
- John Boudreaux – drums
- June Gardner – drums
- Ronald Selico – drums
- Edward Hall – drums, percussion
- Frank Capp – drums, percussion
- Hal Blaine – drums, percussion
- Julius Wechter – drums, percussion
- Al Schmitt – engineer
- Dave Hassinger – engineer
- Dick Bogart – engineer
- Dino Lapis – engineer
- Barney Kessel – guitar
- Bob King – guitar
- Bobby Womack – guitar
- Clifton White – guitar
- Edgar Blanchard – guitar
- George Barnes (musician) – guitar
- Everett Barksdale – guitar
- Glen Campbell – guitar
- Howard Roberts – guitar
- John Pisano – guitar
- LeRoy Crume – guitar
- Norman Bartold – guitar
- Tommy Tedesco – guitar
- Ulysses Livingston – guitar
- William Pitman – guitar
- Joseph Gibbons – guitar, banjo
- William Hinshaw – French horn
- Peter J. Howard – legal
- Peter Guralnick – liner notes
- Hillary Putnam – manufacturing
- Kenneth Silinsky – manufacturing
- Emil Radocchia – marimba, timpani, percussion
- Bob Ludwig – mastering
- Billy Preston – organ
- Jess Rand – photography
- Edward Beal – piano
- Ernest Freeman – piano
- Ernie Hayes – piano
- Harold Battiste – piano
- Raymond Johnson – piano
- Russell Bridges – piano
- Warren Myles – piano
- Al Schmitt – producer
- Art Rupe – producer
- Hugo & Luigi – producer

- Lou Adler – producer
- Bumps Blackwell – producer
- Jody H. Klein – reissue producer
- Teri Landi – reissue producer
- Joe Parker – sales
- Red Tyler – saxophone
- Edgar Redmond – saxophone
- Jewell Grant – saxophone
- John Kelsom – saxophone
- Plas Johnson – saxophone
- William Green – saxophone
- Maria Papazahariou – session research
- Steve Rosenthal – sound restoration
- David Wells – trombone
- John Ewing – trombone
- Louis Blackburn – trombone
- Anthony Terran – trumpet
- John Anderson – trumpet
- Melvin Lastie – trumpet
- Stuart Williamson – trumpet
- Lawrence Bunker – vibraphone
- Allan Harshman – viola
- Alexander Neiman – viola
- Harry Hyams – viola
- Irving Weinper – viola
- Samuel Boghossian – viola
- Wilbert Nuttycombe – viola
- Ambrose Russo – violin
- Alfred Brown – violin
- Archie Levin – violin
- Arnold Belnick – violin
- Ben Miller – violin
- Charles Libove – violin
- Darrel Terwilliger – violin
- David Nadien – violin
- Elliot Fisher – violin
- Fred Fradkin – violin
- Gareth Nuttycombe – violin
- Harold Dickterow – violin
- Harry Lookofsky – violin
- Hinda Barnet – violin
- Irving Lipschultz – violin
- Isadore Roman – violin
- Israel Baker – violin
- John DeVoogdt – violin
- Joseph Saxon – violin
- Leonard Malarsky – violin
- Marshall Sosson – violin
- Marvin Limonick – violin
- Max Cahn – violin
- Myron Sandler – violin
- Ralph Schaeffer – violin
- Robert Barene – violin
- Sidney Sharp – violin
- Tibor Zelig – violin
- William Kurasch – violin

== Charts ==
=== Weekly charts ===
Chart (2003)	Peak position
UK Albums (Official Charts)	19

Chart (2006–07)	Peak position
Norwegian Albums (VG-lista)	3
New Zealand Albums (RMNZ)	3

Chart (2012)	Peak position
US Billboard 200	135
US Top Catalog Albums (Billboard)	20

=== Year-end charts ===
Chart (2005)	Position
UK Albums (OCC)	124

== Certifications ==
Region	Certification	Certified units/sales
United Kingdom (BPI)	Platinum	300,000^{^}
^{^} Shipments figures based on certification alone.
