= The Man and His Music =

Compilation album by Sam Cooke
- Released: February 1986
- Genre: Soul
- Length: 1:10:05
- Label: RCA Victor

The Man and His Music is a 1986 compilation album by Sam Cooke, released posthumously. It debuted about a month after Cooke was inducted into the Rock and Roll Hall of Fame.

== Critical reception ==
Professional ratings
Review scores
Source	Rating
AllMusic	5/5 stars

Bruce Eder of AllMusic writes, "There are better collections with all of these songs and more on them, but none handier than this in presenting every facet of Cooke's work -- the only flaw, if there is one, is the absence of one of the better tracks off of the Harlem Square live album."

Rolling Stone's Steve Bloom writes, "The Man and His Music will probably just confirm what people already knew about Sam Cooke: he possessed a voice that could burn down the house, but he compromised it for stardom."

== Track listing ==
All tracks are written by Sam Cooke.

No.	Title	Length
1.	"Touch the Hem of His Garment"	2:00
2.	"That's Heaven to Me"	2:00
3.	"I'll Come Running Back to You"	2:10
4.	"You Send Me"	2:43
5.	"Win Your Love (For Me)"	2:51
6.	"Just for You"	2:17
7.	"Chain Gang"	2:32
8.	"When a Boy Falls in Love"	2:27
9.	"Only Sixteen"	1:51
10.	"Wonderful World"	2:04
11.	"Cupid"	2:27
12.	"Nothing Can Change This Love"	2:34
13.	"Rome (Wasn't Built in a Day)"	2:25
14.	"Love Will Find a Way"	2:14
15.	"Everybody Loves to Cha Cha Cha"	2:33
16.	"Another Saturday Night"	2:20
17.	"Meet Me at Mary's Place"	2:40
18.	"Having a Party"	2:24
19.	"Good Times"	2:27
20.	"Twistin' the Night Away"	2:38
21.	"Shake"	2:45
22.	"Somebody Have Mercy"	3:00
23.	"Sad Mood"	2:26
24.	"(Ain't That) Good News"	2:26
25.	"Bring It On Home to Me"	2:39
26.	"Soothe Me"	2:08
27.	"That's Where It's At"	2:35
28.	"A Change Is Gonna Come"	3:10
Total length:		68:46

- Track information verified from the album's liner notes.

== Charts ==
Chart (1986)	Peak position
Australian (Kent Music Report)	65
