= Try a Little Love =

Studio album by Sam Cooke
- Released: October 1965
- Genre: Rhythm and blues, soul
- Length: 30:03
- Label: RCA Victor
- Producer: Al Schmitt, Hugo & Luigi

Sam Cooke chronology
The Best of Sam Cooke, Volume II (1965)	Try a Little Love (1965)	The Unforgettable Sam Cooke (1966)

Try a Little Love is the second posthumous studio album by American singer-songwriter Sam Cooke. Sammy Davis Jr. composed the liner notes.

== Track listing ==
=== Side one ===
1. "Try a Little Love" (J.W. Alexander, Sam Cooke)
2. "Don't Cry on My Shoulder" (Pat Kennedy, Turk Prujan)
3. "Bridge of Tears" (J.W. Alexander)
4. "I Fall in Love Every Day" (Jimmy Clark)
5. "You're Always on My Mind" (James W. Alexander)
6. "Almost in Your Arms" (Jay Livingston, Ray Evans, Sam Cooke)

=== Side two ===
1. "When a Boy Falls in Love" (Clinton Levert, Sam Cooke)
2. "To Each His Own" (Jay Livingston, Ray Evans)
3. "Tammy" (Jay Livingston, Ray Evans)
4. "The Gypsy" (Billy Reid)
5. "The Little Things You Do" (J.W. Alexander)
6. "You Send Me" (L.C. Cook)

==== Notes ====
- Tracks 1–3, 7 & 8 are unreleased.
- Track 4 was the B-side to "Chain Gang" in 1960.
- Track 5 is from My Kind of Blues (1961).
- Track 6 was the B-side to "Win Your Love for Me" in 1958.
- Tracks 9 & 12 are from Sam Cooke (1958).
- Track 10 is from Encore (1958).
- Track 11 was the B-side to "Everybody Loves to Cha-Cha-Cha" in 1959.

== Personnel ==
- René Hall, Sammy Lowe – arrangers
- Billy Mure, René Hall, Sammy Lowe – conductors

== Charts ==
Chart (1965)	Peak position
Billboard Top LPs	120
