= Live at the Harlem Square Club, 1963 =

Live album by Sam Cooke
- Released: June 1985
- Recorded: January 12, 1963
- Venues: Harlem Square Club, Miami, Florida
- Genres: Soul; R&B
- Length: 37:29
- Label: RCA Victor

Alternative cover
- 2005 remaster

Live at the Harlem Square Club, 1963 is the second live album by the American singer-songwriter Sam Cooke. The album was recorded at the Harlem Square Club in Miami and released in June 1985 in the United States by RCA Records. Initially recorded on January 12, 1963, to be released as a live album titled One Night Stand, the concert album was not released until 1985. RCA Victor, at the time, viewed the album as too gritty and raw and possibly damaging to his pop image, and quietly kept the recordings in their archive.

The album is generally considered among the best live albums by contemporary music critics, and has been ranked in "best-of" music lists, including on Rolling Stone's list of The 500 Greatest Albums of All Time. Three mixes of the record exist: the 1985 issue, a version included on the 2000 box set The Man Who Invented Soul, and a 2005 remaster from RCA.

== Background ==
In 1962, RCA Victor decided it was time for Cooke to record a live album, and a warm January night at the Harlem Square Club in Miami was picked to record. The Harlem Square Club was a small downtown nightspot in Miami's historically African-American neighborhood of Overtown, and was packed with the singer's most devoted fans from his days singing gospel. RCA found the results too loud, raw and raucous – not the Cooke the label was trying to break as an international pop star – and shelved the recordings for over two decades.

In 1985, executive Gregg Geller discovered the tapes and quickly issued Live at the Harlem Square Club, 1963 that year. "Sam was what we've come to call a crossover artist: He crossed over from gospel to pop, which was controversial enough in its day. But once he became a pop artist, he had a certain mainstream image to protect," Geller said in 2013. "The fact is, when he was out on the road, he was playing to a predominantly, almost exclusively black audience. And he was doing a different kind of show — a much more down-home, down-to-earth, gut-bucket kind of show than what he would do for his pop audience."

Three mixes of the album have been released. The original 1985 mix contains a louder audience response, creating a "claustrophobic, frenzied power". A new mix created for the 2000 box set, The Man Who Invented Soul, turns the audience elements down, cleaning up Cooke's vocals as well as the music. The third mix of the album released in 2005 generally splits the difference between these two releases.

== Reception ==
Professional ratings
Review scores
| Source | Rating |
|---|---|
| Allmusic | link (2005 reissue) link |
| Blender | Oct. 2005 |
| Mojo | (favorable) |
| Pitchfork | 10/10 |

Live at the Harlem Square Club, 1963 has generally been considered among the best live LPs ever released. In the year of its release (1985), it was ranked at number 11 on The Village Voice's Pazz & Jop critics poll, as well as being named number 7 on NME's albums of the year.

Steve Leggett for AllMusic feels that "Not only is this one of the greatest live soul albums ever released, it also reveals a rougher, rawer, and more immediate side to Sam Cooke that his singles only hinted at, good as they were [...] the crucial key is and was always Cooke's vocals, and while he was a marvelously smooth, versatile, and urbane singer on his official pop recordings, here he explodes into one of the finest sets of raw secular gospel ever captured on tape. It is essential listening in any version." A 2023 review from Marc Hogan of Pitchfork called it "a monumental artifact of soul—one of the best live albums of all time", with Hogan writing that it "captures one of the most beguiling figures of 20th-century music as close to the peak of his powers as he was ever recorded, sounding grittier and more seductive than you'll hear on those good-times oldies blocks but still every bit in command".

In 2003, Rolling Stone ranked the album at number 443 on its list of The 500 Greatest Albums of All Time, with the rank climbing to number 439 in the 2012 revision and to number 240 in the 2020 reboot of the list. "Cooke was elegance personified, but he works this Florida club until it's hotter than hell, while sounding like he never breaks a sweat [...] when the crowd sings along with him, it's magic," said Rolling Stone. The album appears in the book 1001 Albums You Must Hear Before You Die.

== Track listing ==
All tracks composed by Sam Cooke, except where indicated.

=== 1985 version ===
1. "Feel It" – 3:46
2. "Chain Gang" – 3:11
3. "Cupid" – 2:46
4. "Medley: It's All Right/For Sentimental Reasons" (Cooke/Deke Watson, William Best) – 5:11
5. "Twistin' the Night Away" – 4:19
6. "Somebody Have Mercy" – 4:45
7. "Bring It On Home to Me" – 5:37
8. "Nothing Can Change This Love" – 3:45
9. "Having a Party" – 4:09

Total time: 37:29

=== 2000 The Man Who Invented Soul version ===
1. "Intro/(Don't Fight It) Feel It" – 3:46
2. "Chain Gang" – 3:12
3. "Cupid" – 2:45
4. "It's All Right/For Sentimental Reasons" (Cooke/Deke Watson, William Best) – 5:13
5. "Twistin' the Night Away" – 4:17
6. "Somebody Have Mercy" – 7:16
7. "Bring It On Home to Me" – 3:04
8. "Nothin' Can Change This Love" – 3:46
9. "Having a Party" – 5:25

(actually tracks 13 through 21 on the CD)

Total time: 38:44

=== 2005 version ===
1. "Soul Twist/Introduction" (Curtis Ousley) – 1:23
2. "Feel It (Don't Fight It)" – 2:54
3. "Chain Gang" – 3:11
4. "Cupid" – 2:44
5. "Medley: It's All Right/For Sentimental Reasons" (Cooke/Ivory "Deek" Watson, William "Pat" Best) – 5:11
6. "Twistin' the Night Away" – 4:18
7. "Somebody Have Mercy" – 6:18
8. "Bring It On Home to Me" – 4:08
9. "Nothing Can Change This Love" – 2:39
10. "Having a Party" – 5:03

Total time: 38:49

== Personnel ==
All credits adapted from The RCA Albums Collection (2011) liner notes.

- Sam Cooke – vocals
- Clifton White – guitar
- Cornell Dupree – guitar
- Jimmy Lewis – bass guitar
- Albert "June" Gardner – drums
- George Stubbs – piano
- King Curtis – saxophone
- Tate Houston – saxophone

Technical

- Bob Simpson – recording
- Anthony Salvatore – recording
- Steve Rosenthal – mixing
- Tom Psipsikas – assistant engineer
- Hugo & Luigi – recording supervisor
- Joe J. Stelmach – art director
- Michael Ochs – photography
