= We Remember Sam Cooke =

Studio album by the Supremes
- Released: April 12, 1965
- Genres: Soul; R&B
- Length: 28:20
- Label: Motown
- Producers: Harvey Fuqua; Hal Davis; Marc Gordon

The Supremes chronology
The Supremes Sing Country, Western and Pop (1965)	We Remember Sam Cooke (1965)	More Hits by The Supremes (1965)

Alternative cover
- Cover for United Kingdom/international versions

Professional ratings
Review scores
Source	Rating
AllMusic	3/5 stars
The Encyclopedia of Popular Music	3/5 stars

We Remember Sam Cooke is the fifth studio album recorded by the Supremes, issued by Motown in April 1965. The album is a tribute album dedicated to soul musician Sam Cooke, who had died the previous December. Notable selections on the album, consisting entirely of Cooke covers, included covers of "A Change Is Gonna Come", "You Send Me" and "(Ain't That) Good News" (led by Florence Ballard).

It was the second most successful in a series of themed albums enjoying a number five peak on the Billboard R&B chart.

== Track listing ==
All songs written by Sam Cooke, except where noted.

=== Side one ===
1. "You Send Me"
2. "Nothing Can Change This Love"
3. "Cupid"
4. "Chain Gang" (Sam Cooke, Charles Cook)
5. "Bring It on Home to Me"
6. "Only Sixteen"

=== Side two ===
1. "Havin' a Party"
2. "Shake"
3. "Wonderful World" (Sam Cooke, Herb Alpert, Lou Adler)
4. "A Change Is Gonna Come"
5. "(Ain't That) Good News"

== Personnel ==
- Diana Ross – lead vocals, background vocals on "(Ain't That) Good News"
- Florence Ballard – lead vocal on "(Ain't That) Good News", background vocals
- Mary Wilson – background vocals
- Harvey Fuqua, Hal Davis and Marc Gordon – producers

== Charts ==
Chart (1965)	Peak position
US Billboard 200	75
US Top R&B/Hip-Hop Albums (Billboard)	5
