= The Dick Clark Show =

- Also known as: Dick Clark's Saturday Night Beechnut Show
- Genre: Musical variety
- Presented by: Dick Clark
- Country of origin: United States
- Original language: English
- No. of seasons: 3
- No. of episodes: 136

Production
- Executive producers: Louis M. Hayward; Charles Reeves
- Production locations: Little Theater (Manhattan); New York
- Camera setup: Multi-camera
- Running time: 22–24 minutes
- Production company: Dick Clark Productions

Original release
- Network: ABC
- Release: February 15, 1958 – September 10, 1960

The Dick Clark Show (also known as Dick Clark's Saturday Night Beechnut Show) is an American musical variety show broadcast weekly in the United States on the ABC television network 7:30-8 p.m. (Eastern Time) on Saturdays from February 15, 1958, to September 10, 1960, sponsored (except for the first two shows) by Beechnut Gum.

== Summary ==
Dick Clark, hosting throughout the entire series, introduced musical guests, who sang/performed (or, more often, lip-synced) their latest popular hit. Often, after a performance (and sometimes before), Clark interviewed the musician(s). Between performances on some shows, he also interviewed non-musical celebrity guests, usually a television or movie star—Bob Hope, Johnny Carson, Tony Randall, and Chuck Connors, among others.

The show was typically staged live, in New York City, at Manhattan's Little Theater (now the Helen Hayes Theatre). For the Manhattan broadcasts, the audience sat in theater seats, rather than standing and dancing as in Clark's concurrent pop-music show, American Bandstand—this distinction is the best method to identify whether a video recording of an artist's performance is from this show, or from American Bandstand.

The show was occasionally broadcast from remote locations across the United States. The May 30, 1959, show was broadcast from the Sheraton Hotel in Binghamton, New York. Three shows, spanning from August 22, 1959, through September 5, 1959, were broadcast remotely from Hollywood, California. Another set of five shows were broadcast remotely from various locations across the country between June 11, 1960, and July 9, 1960.

Given that the show ran continually year-round for over two-and-a-half years, resulting in 136 episodes, there were no seasons as such. However, the "first season" of 29 shows could be said to have run from the premiere through August 30, 1958, the "second season" of 53 shows, September 6, 1958, through September 5, 1959, and the "third season" of 54 shows, September 12, 1959, through September 10, 1960.

== Top Ten ==
At the end of each show, Clark would announce the ten most popular songs from the current Top 40 in reverse order from number 10 on down to number 1, as the "American Bandstand Top Ten". On the first show, Clark played a brief soundclip from each top ten record as its title was announced. On each subsequent show, Clark played the soundclip only for those records which were "new" on the Top Ten that week.

== First show ==
The first show was broadcast February 15, 1958, with no sponsor—Beechnut began sponsoring the show the third week. Guests on the first show were:

- Pat Boone (interviewed, and singing "Wonderful Time Up There", "It's Too Soon To Know")
- Jerry Lee Lewis ("Breathless", "Great Balls of Fire")
- Connie Francis ("Who's Sorry Now?")
- Johnnie Ray (interviewed and plugging his latest single "Strollin' Girl")
- Elaine Berman, President of a Jerry Lee Lewis Fan Club (interviewed)
- The Royal Teens ("Short Shorts")
- Chuck Willis ("Betty And Dupree")

== Guests ==
Guests included almost every popular American singer of the 1950s. Jackie Wilson and Bobby Rydell were the most frequent guests, each appearing on fourteen different shows. Frankie Avalon and Paul Anka, each with ten appearances, were the next most frequent guests. Next was Jack Scott, on nine shows. Bobby Darin and Dion and the Belmonts were next with eight appearances each; Johnny Maestro (both solo and as a member of the Crests), Annette Funicello, the Four Preps, Freddy Cannon, and Fabian were next at seven times each. At six times each were Neil Sedaka, Anita Bryant, Conway Twitty, Lloyd Price, Duane Eddy, and Jimmy Clanton.

Excluding the names listed above, at least seventy-five other singers and musicians appeared on two or more shows. Among them, along with a sampling of the songs they sang (and when), were:

- Johnny Cash sang:

- "Guess Things Happen That Way" on the July 5, 1958, show
- "It's Just About Time" on the December 20, 1958, show
- "The Rebel – Johnny Yuma" on the March 26, 1960, show

- Danny and the Juniors sang:

- "Rock and Roll Is Here to Stay" on the February 22, 1958, show
- "At the Hop" and "Dottie" on the June 21, 1958, show
- "Twistin' U.S.A." on the September 3, 1960, show

- Clyde McPhatter sang:

- "A Lover's Question" on the November 15, 1958, show
- "Since You Been Gone" on the July 4, 1959, show

- Bill Haley and the Comets sang "Rock Around the Clock", "Shake, Rattle, and Roll", and "Tamiami" on the February 20, 1960, show
- Little Anthony & the Imperials sang

- "Tears on My Pillow" on the August 23, 1958, show
- "So Much" on the November 29, 1958, show
- "Shimmy, Shimmy Ko-Ko Bop" on the January 2, 1960, show

- Billy Bland sang

- "Let the Little Girl Dance" on the April 23, 1960, show
- "Pardon Me" on the August 6, 1960, show

- The Chordettes sang:

- "Lollipop" and "Mr. Sandman" on the February 22, 1958, show
- "Lollipop" and "Zorro" on the April 26, 1958, show
- "No Other Arms, No Other Lips" on the March 28, 1959, show

- Everly Brothers sang:

- "All I Have to Do Is Dream" and "Wake Up Little Susie" on the April 5, 1958, show
- "Cathy's Clown", "When Will I Be Loved?" and "So Sad (To Watch Good Love Go Bad)" on the July 9, 1960, Hollywood show

- Frankie Lymon sang:

- "Mama Don't Allow It" on the May 17, 1958, show
- "Little Bitty Pretty One" on the August 13, 1960, show

- Chubby Checker sang:

- "The Class" on the May 23, 1959, show
- "The Twist" on the August 6, 1960, show

- Jimmie Rodgers sang "Honeycomb" on the May 3, 1958, show
- Eddie Cochran sang:

- "Summertime Blues" on the August 30, 1958, show
- “Somethin' Else” on the October 10, 1959, show
- "Sittin' in the Balcony" on the October 10, 1959, show
- "C'mon Everybody" on the November 29, 1959, show

- Sam Cooke sang:

- "Lonely Island" on the March 22, 1958, show
- "Win Your Love For Me" on the October 11, 1958, show
- "Everybody Likes to Cha Cha Cha" and "You Send Me" on the March 14, 1959, show
- "Only Sixteen" on the June 20, 1959, show

- Fats Domino sang a medley of "I'm In Love Again", "Blueberry Hill", "I Want You To Know", "Ain't That a Shame", "Blue Monday", and "I'm Walkin'" on the March 29, 1958, show
- La Vern Baker sang:

- "I Cried a Tear" on the January 10, 1959, show
- "I Waited Too Long" on the May 16, 1959, show

- The Big Bopper sang "Chantilly Lace" on the September 20, 1958, and the November 22, 1958, shows
- Chuck Berry sang:

- "Sweet Little Sixteen" on the February 22, 1958, show (second of the series)
- "Johnny B. Goode" on the May 17, 1958, show
- "Back in the U.S.A." on the July 18, 1959, show

- Jan and Dean sang:

- "Baby Talk" on the September 5, 1959, show
- "White Tennis Sneakers" on the April 16, 1960, show
- Baby Talk" and "We Go Together" on the June 25, 1960, show

- The Coasters sang:

- "Yakety Yak" on the May 31, 1958, and August 16, 1958, shows
- "Charlie Brown" on the March 7, 1959, show

- Johnny Horton sang:

- "The Battle of New Orleans" on the August 29, 1959, Hollywood show
- "Sink the Bismarck" on the April 2, 1960, Manhattan show

- Sandy Nelson performed "Teen Beat" on the October 3, 1959, show
- Johnny Tillotson sang "Why Do I Love You So?" on the February 20, 1960, show
- Dorsey Burnette sang:

- "There Was a Tall Oak Tree" on the March 19, 1960, show
- "Hey Little One" on the June 25, 1960, show

- Dodie Stevens sang:

- "Pink Shoe Laces" on the February 28, 1959, show
- "Miss Lonelyhearts" on the August 22, 1959, show

Among the single-appearance guests were:

- Buddy Holly sang "It's So Easy" on the October 25, 1958, show
- Brian Hyland sang "Itsy Bitsy Teenie Weenie Yellow Polka Dot Bikini" at the July 16, 1960, show
- The Cadillacs sang "Peek a Boo" on the November 22, 1958, show
- Roy Orbison sang "Only the Lonely" and "Uptown" at the July 23, 1960, show
- The Ventures performed "Walk, Don't Run" on the August 27, 1960, show
- The Isley Brothers sang the first two minutes of "Shout" on the October 10, 1959, show
- The Olympics sang "Western Movies" on either the July 26, 1958, show, or the August 2, 1958, show
- The Teddy Bears sang "To Know Him Is to Love Him" on the November 15, 1958, show
- The Shirelles sang "I Met Him On a Sunday" on the April 5, 1958, show
- Bill Justis performed "College Man" and "Raunchy" on the February 22, 1958, show
- The Chantels sang "Maybe" on the March 1, 1958, show
- Teresa Brewer sang "There's Nothing As Lonesome As Saturday Night" and "Whirlpool" on the March 1, 1958, show
- Ritchie Valens sang "Donna" on the December 27, 1958, show
- Andy Williams sang "Canadian Sunset" and "Are You Sincere?" on the March 15, 1958, show
- The Diamonds sang "Little Darlin'" on February 21, 1959, show

== Notable episodes ==
- February 22, 1958

Dick Clark interviewed Johnny Carson.

- March 8, 1958

Dick Clark announced that viewers could receive in the mail an "autographed" 45 RPM single of Jerry Lee Lewis's latest hit Breathless by sending in five Beechnut Gum wrappers and fifty cents for shipping and handling. 48,000 requests were received. Sun Records sent out the promotional records, the song moved further up the Top 40, and sales of Beechnut Gum increased—the deal made between Dick Clark and Sam Phillips of Sun Records for this promotion drew some criticism and accusations of payola, but resulted in no scandal and no indictments.

- May 10, 1958

Dick Clark interviewed Bob Hope; together, they lip-synced the Hope/Crosby song "Paris Holiday".

- November 29, 1958

Because the show was being filmed the day before Dick Clark's birthday, Bobby Darin and other singers wished Dick Clark a happy birthday (but did not sing the "Happy Birthday To You" song).

- January 3, 1959

David Seville and The Chipmunks performed "The Chipmunk Song (Christmas Don't Be Late)" on the eighth day of Christmas.

- May 3, 1959

A Western-themed show, with Dick Clark and guests in cowboy attire. Paul Anka ("Lonely Boy"), Jesse Belvin ("Guess Who?"), Ronnie Hawkins & The Hawks (featuring drummer Levon Helm) ("Forty Days"), Johnny Horton ("The Battle of New Orleans"), The Skyliners ("Since I Don't Have You" and "This I Swear").

- May 30, 1959

Remote broadcast from Binghamton, New York, filmed outdoors. Duane Eddy ("Rebel Rouser", "Forty Miles of Bad Road"), Annette Funicello ("Lonely Guitar", "Wild Party"), The Four Preps, Billy Storm

- 1959 summer-series of three consecutive remote shows broadcast from Hollywood, California

- August 22, 1959
  Fabian ("Got the Feeling", "Come on and Get Me"), Bobby Darin ("Mack the Knife", "Dream Lover"), Dodie Stevens ("Miss Lonelyhearts"), and Mitchell Torok ("Caribbean").
- August 29, 1959
  Johnny Horton ("Johnny Reb", "Battle Of New Orleans"), The Four Preps ("I Ain't Never"), Connie Stevens ("Why Do I Cry For Joey?"), Paul Petersen and Shelley Fabares (interviewed), The Diamonds ("Young In Years"), and Tab Hunter ("Our Love", "Waiting For Fall").
- September 5, 1959
  Duane Eddy, Jan & Dean ("Baby Talk"), Frankie Avalon ("Just Ask Your Heart"), and Anita Bryant ("Til There Was You").

- December 31, 1959

Dick Clark hosted a special edition of the show on New Year's Eve, despite that day being on a Thursday. Because of the show's cancellation, it was not reprised the next year. Clark returned to ABC's New Year coverage in 1974, when he brought New Year's Rockin' Eve to the network; Clark remained in that role until his death, and the show still bears his name.

- 1960 summer-series of five consecutive remote shows

- June 11, 1960 (broadcast from Pittsburgh, Pennsylvania)
  Bobby Darin ("Bill Bailey, Won't You Please Come Home", "I'll Be There"), The Crests ("Trouble in Paradise"), The Fendermen ("Mule Skinner Blues"), Paul Evans ("Happy-Go-Lucky Me"), and The Skyliners ("Pennies from Heaven")
- June 18, 1960 (broadcast from Hollywood, California)
  The Safaris ("Image of a Girl"), The Hollywood Argyles ("Alley Oop"), The Crosby Brothers ("The Green Grass Grows"), and Jimmie Rodgers ("Just a Little Closer Walk With Thee")
- June 25, 1960 (broadcast from Treasure Island Naval Base near San Francisco, California)
  The Olympics (Big Boy Pete), Jan and Dean ("Baby Talk", "We Go Together"), Dorsey Burnette ("Hey Little One"), and The Four Preps ("Got a Girl")
- July 2, 1960 (broadcast from Chicago, Illinois)
  Brenda Lee ("I'm Sorry", "That's All You Gotta Do"), Freddy Cannon ("Jump Over"), Tommy Edwards ("I Really Don't Want to Know"), and Jack Scott ("Burning Bridges")
- July 9, 1960 (broadcast from Hollywood, California)
  The Everly Brothers ("Cathy's Clown", "When Will I Be Loved?", "So Sad"), Jeanne Black ("He'll Have to Stay", "Lisa"), Deane Hawley ("Look for a Star"), and Larry Bright ("Mo-Jo Workout")

- August 6, 1960

Chubby Checker introduced "The Twist" to America.

== Final show ==
The last show was September 10, 1960. Highlights of the series were shown from past shows:

- Bobby Darin ("Splish Splash", "Mack the Knife")
- Connie Francis ("Lipstick on Your Collar")
- Frankie Avalon ("DeDe Dinah")
- Fabian ("Turn Me Loose")
- Bobby Rydell ("Kissin' Time")
- Annette Funicello and Paul Anka (Medley of hits)
- Duane Eddy and The Rebels ("Rebel Rouser", "Forty Miles of Bad Road")
