= Hit Kit =

Compilation album by Sam Cooke
- Released: 1959
- Genre: Soul, R&B, pop
- Label: Keen

Singles from Hit Kit
- 1. "You Send Me" Released: March 24, 1958

Hit Kit is a greatest-hits compilation by American singer-songwriter Sam Cooke. The package of previously released singles was assembled, according to Cashbox, for "quick commercial consumption."

The album was released in 1959 on Keen Records.

Professional ratings
Review scores
Source	Rating
Allmusic	link

== Track listing ==
=== Side one ===
1. Only Sixteen – 2:00
2. All of My Life – 2:20
3. Everybody Loves to Cha Cha Cha – 2:35
4. Blue Moon – 2:45
5. Win Your Love for Me – 2:26
6. Lonely Island – 2:31

=== Side two ===
1. You Send Me – 2:41
2. Love You Most of All – 2:15
3. For Sentimental Reasons – 2:40
4. Little Things You Do – 2:13
5. Let's Go Steady Again – 2:29
6. You Were Made for Me – 2:52
