= Twistin' the Night Away (album) =

Studio album by Sam Cooke
- Released: April 1962
- Recorded: January 30, 1961; RCA Victor Studios (New York City); December 18–19, 1961; February 15–16, 19 1962; RCA Victor Studios (Hollywood)
- Genre: Rhythm and blues, dance, soul
- Length: 27:31
- Label: RCA Victor
- Producer: Hugo & Luigi

Sam Cooke chronology
My Kind of Blues (1961)	Twistin' the Night Away (1962)	The Best of Sam Cooke (1962)

Singles from Twistin' the Night Away
- 1. "That's It—I Quit—I'm Movin' On" Released: February 14, 1961; 2. "Twistin' the Night Away" Released: January 9, 1962

Professional ratings
Review scores
Source	Rating
New Record Mirror	4/5 stars

Twistin' the Night Away is the eighth studio album by American singer-songwriter Sam Cooke. Produced by Hugo & Luigi, the album was released in April 1962 in the United States by RCA Victor. Twistin' the Night Away primarily capitalizes on the twist phenomenon and as a result became one of Cooke's most successful LPs, becoming his second to chart and creating a string of chart successes.

Twistin' the Night Away peaked at number 74 on Billboard's Top LPs chart, while the single of the same name charted higher at number nine on the Billboard Hot 100.

== Background ==
Twistin' the Night Away originated during the recording team's move to RCA Victor's Hollywood studios. Sammy Lowe, conductor of Cooke's past two albums, brought aboard René Hall, an arranger he had worked with in their days at Keen Records. Hall in turn booked horn players Plas Johnson, Jackie Kelso and Jewell Grant "to spike up what was effectively a return to former glories."

== Reception ==
Bruce Eder of Allmusic wrote that while Cooke was "shoehorned" into doing twist numbers, it remains nevertheless "one of the great dance albums of its period," and "a brilliant soul album as well, which is why it holds up 40 years later." Melody Maker wrote that "Cooke was unique because he was one of the first black artists to keep a tight hand on the direction of his career and the profits thereof," calling the album's hit single a "dance-craze classic."

== Track listing ==
All songs written by Sam Cooke, except where noted. All songs arranged and conducted by René Hall, except "That's It—I Quit—I'm Movin' On", conducted by Sammy Lowe.

=== Side one ===
1. "Twistin' the Night Away" – 2:39
2. "Sugar Dumpling" – 2:16
3. "Twistin' in the Kitchen with Dinah" – 2:08
4. "Somebody's Gonna Miss Me" (Lattimore Brown, Arthur Lee Reeves) – 2:32
5. "A Whole Lotta Woman" (James W. Alexander, Lowell Jordan) – 2:20
6. "The Twist" (Hank Ballard) – 2:27

=== Side two ===
1. "Twistin' in the Old Town Tonight" (Mack David) – 2:08
2. "Movin' And A'Groovin'" (Cooke, Lou Rawls) – 2:34
3. "Camptown Twist" – 2:13
4. "Somebody Have Mercy" – 2:56
5. "Soothe Me" – 2:07
6. "That's It—I Quit—I'm Movin' On" (Roy Alfred, Del Sorino) – 2:31

== Personnel ==
All credits adapted from The RCA Albums Collection (2011) liner notes.

- Sam Cooke – vocals
- René Hall – guitar, arrangement, conducting
- Sammy Lowe – conductor on "That's It—I Quit—I'm Movin' On"
- Clifton White, Al Chernet, Charles Macey, Tommy Tedesco, Bobby Gibbons – guitar
- Lloyd Trotman, Red Callender, Jimmy Bond, Ray Pohlman – bass guitar
- Panama Francis, Earl Palmer, Sharky Hall – drums
- Bobby Donaldson – percussion
- Ernest Hayes, Eddie Beal, Marty Harris – piano
- Stuart Williamson, John Anderson – trumpet
- Larry Altpeter, Albert Godlis, Frank Saracco, John Ewing – trombone
- Jackie Kelso, Plas Johnson – tenor saxophone
- Jewell Grant – baritone saxophone
- Hinda Barnett, Frederick Buldrini, Morris Lefkowitz, Archie Levin, Ben Miller, George Ockner, Sylvan Ockner, Franklin Siegfried, Harry Urbont – violin
- Al Schmitt – recording engineer

== Charts ==
Chart (1962)	Peak position
Billboard Top LPs	74
