= Somebody Have Mercy =

Single by Sam Cooke

from the album Twistin' the Night Away
- A-side: "Nothing Can Change This Love"
- Released: September 11, 1962
- Recorded: February 15, 1962; RCA Studio 1 (Hollywood, California)
- Genre: Rhythm and blues, soul
- Length: 2:17
- Label: RCA Victor
- Songwriter: Sam Cooke
- Producer: Hugo & Luigi

Sam Cooke singles chronology
"Bring It On Home to Me" (1962)	"Somebody Have Mercy" (1962)	"Send Me Some Lovin'" (1962)

"Somebody Have Mercy" is a song by American singer-songwriter Sam Cooke, originally released in April 1962 on the album Twistin' the Night Away.

== Background ==
One line in the song ("Tell me what is wrong with me") created speculation and rampant rumors that Cooke was suffering from leukemia, which was false.

== Personnel ==
"Somebody Have Mercy" was recorded on February 15, 1962 at RCA Studio 1 in Hollywood, California. The musicians also recorded much of the Twistin' the Night Away album the same day. The session was conducted and arranged by René Hall, producers were Hugo & Luigi. Credits adapted from the liner notes to the 2003 compilation Portrait of a Legend: 1951–1964.

- Sam Cooke – vocals
- Edward Beal – piano

== Charts and certifications ==
=== Weekly charts ===
"Somebody Have Mercy" was later selected for the B-side of the single "Nothing Can Change This Love", which was released on September 11, 1962. It received enough airplay to make the Billboard charts on its own, peaking at No. 3 R&B and No. 70 Pop.

Chart (1962)	Peak position
US Billboard Hot 100	70
US Hot R&B Singles (Billboard)	3
