= 3 Great Guys =

Three Great Guys

Studio album by Paul Anka, Sam Cooke and Neil Sedaka
- Released: February 1964
- Genre: Pop
- Label: RCA Victor
- Producer: Hugo & Luigi

Sam Cooke chronology
Night Beat (1963)	Three Great Guys (1964)	Ain't That Good News (1964)

Three Great Guys is a joint album by Paul Anka, Sam Cooke and Neil Sedaka. It was released in February 1964 and included 12 songs with four songs from each of the three artists and a collaboration on the last Neil Sedaka track by Stan Applebaum and His Orchestra. René Hall and Sammy Lowe were the orchestra conductors on the other tracks.

== Track list ==
Side A

1. "I Can't Say a Word" – Paul Anka
2. "No, No" – Paul Anka
3. "I'm Gonna Forget About You" – Sam Cooke
4. "Tenderness" – Sam Cooke
5. "This Endless Night" – Neil Sedaka (arranged by conductor Stan Applebaum and produced by Al Nevins)
6. "Too Late" – Neil Sedaka (produced by Al Nevins and Don Kirshner)

Side B

1. "Laugh Laugh Laugh" – Paul Anka
2. "I Remember" – Paul Anka
3. "I Ain't Gonna Cheat On You No More" – Sam Cooke
4. "Talkin' Trash" – Sam Cooke
5. "Without Your Love" – Neil Sedaka (produced by Al Nevins)
6. "Another Day, Another Heartache" – Neil Sedaka with Stan Applebaum and His Orchestra (produced by Al Nevins and Don Kirshner)
