= Mr. Soul (Sam Cooke album) =

Studio album by Sam Cooke
- Released: February 1963
- Recorded: August 23; November 29; December 14–16, 1962
- Studio: RCA's Music Center of the World, (Hollywood, California)
- Genre: Rhythm and blues, soul
- Length: 35:56
- Label: RCA Victor
- Producer: Hugo & Luigi

Sam Cooke chronology
The Best of Sam Cooke (1963)	Mr. Soul (1963)	Night Beat (1963)

Singles from Mr. Soul
- 1. "Nothing Can Change This Love" Released: September 11, 1962

Professional ratings
Review scores
Source	Rating
New Record Mirror	4/5 stars

Mr. Soul is the ninth studio album by American singer-songwriter Sam Cooke. Produced by Hugo & Luigi, the album was released in February 1963 in the United States by RCA Victor.

The album was remastered in 2011 as a part of The RCA Albums Collection.

== Chart performance ==
The album debuted on Billboard magazine's 150 Best Sellers, Monoraul chart in the issue dated March 23, 1963, peaking at No. 94 during a nine-week run on the chart.

== Track listing ==
All songs arranged and conducted by Horace Ott, except "Nothing Can Change This Love" conducted by René Hall.

Side one

1. "I Wish You Love" (Léo Chauliac, Charles Trenet, Albert Beach) – 2:24
2. "Willow Weep for Me" (Ann Ronell) – 2:26
3. "Chains of Love (Ahmet Ertegun, under the pseudonym A. Nugetre) – 2:50
4. "Smoke Rings" (Ned Washington, H. Eugene Gifford) – 3:26
5. "All the Way" (Sammy Cahn, Jimmy Van Heusen) – 3:29
6. "Send Me Some Lovin'" (Leo Price, John Marascalco) – 2:48

Side two

7. "Cry Me a River" (Arthur Hamilton) – 2:47
8. "Driftin' Blues" (Johnny Moore, Charles Brown, Eddie Williams) – 3:17
9. "For Sentimental Reasons" (Deek Watson, William Best) – 3:16
10. "Nothing Can Change This Love" (Sam Cooke) – 2:38
11. "Little Girl" (Madeline Hyde, Francis Henry) – 2:36
12. "These Foolish Things" (Eric Maschwitz, Jack Strachey, Harry Link) – 4:01

== Personnel ==
All credits adapted from The RCA Albums Collection (2011) liner notes.

- Sam Cooke – vocals
- Horace Ott – arrangement and conducting
- René Hall – arrangement and conductor on "Nothing Can Change This Love"
- Clifton White, Bill Pitman, Tommy Tedesco – guitar
- Ray Pohlman, Clifford Hills, Red Callender – bass guitar
- Earl Palmer, Sharky Hall – drums
- Ron Rich – percussion
- Edward Beal, Ernie Freeman, Ray Johnson, Al Pellegrini – piano
- Nathan Griffin – organ
- Bill Green, Plas Johnson – saxophone
- John Ewing – trombone
- Israel Baker, Robert Barene, Leonard Malarsky, Myron Sandler, Ralph Schaeffer, Sid Sharp, Autrey McKissack, Arnold Belnick, Jerome Reisler – violin
- Harry Hyams, Alexander Neiman – viola
- Jesse Ehrlich, Irving Lipschultz, George Neikrug, Emmet Sergeant – cello
- William Hinshaw – French horn
- Dave Hassinger – recording engineer

== Charts ==
Chart (1963)	Peak position
US Billboard Top LPs (Monoraul)	94
