= My Kind of Blues (Sam Cooke album) =

Studio album by Sam Cooke
- Released: October 1961
- Recorded: May 19–20, 1961
- Studios: RCA, New York City
- Genres: Rhythm and blues, soul
- Length: 32:37
- Label: RCA Victor
- Producer: Hugo & Luigi

Sam Cooke chronology
| Swing Low (1961) | My Kind of Blues (1961) | Twistin' the Night Away (1962) |

My Kind of Blues is the seventh studio album by American singer-songwriter Sam Cooke. Record producer by Hugo & Luigi, the album was released in October 1961 in the United States by RCA Victor.

The album was remastered in 2011 as a part of The RCA Albums Collection.

== Track listing ==
All songs arranged and conducted by Sammy Lowe.

=== Side one ===
1. "Don't Get Around Much Anymore" (Bob Russell, Duke Ellington) – 3:10
2. "Little Girl Blue" (Richard Rodgers, Lorenz Hart) – 2:55
3. "Nobody Knows You When You're Down and Out" (Jimmy Cox) – 3:20
4. "Out in the Cold Again" (Ted Koehler, Rube Bloom) – 2:25
5. "But Not for Me" (George Gershwin, Ira Gershwin) – 2:29
6. "Exactly Like You" (Dorothy Fields, Jimmy McHugh) – 2:05

=== Side two ===
1. "I'm Just a Lucky So and So" (Duke Ellington, Mack David) – 3:10
2. "Since I Met You Baby" (Ivory Joe Hunter) – 3:00
3. "Baby, Won't You Please Come Home" (Charles Warfield, Clarence Williams) – 2:08
4. "Trouble in Mind" (Richard M. Jones) – 2:55
5. "You're Always on My Mind" (James W. Alexander) – 2:12
6. "The Song Is Ended" (Irving Berlin) – 2:07

== Personnel ==
All credits adapted from The RCA Albums Collection (2011) liner notes.

- Sam Cooke – vocals
- Clifton White, Everett Barksdale – guitar
- George Duvivier, Lloyd Trotman – bass guitar
- Panama Francis – drums
- Morris Wechsler, Ernest Hayes – piano
- Toots Mondello, Reuben Phillips, Seldon Powell, Melvin Tax, Jerome Richardson – saxophone
- Ray Copeland, Steve Lipkins, Lou Oles, Joe Wilder, John Grimes – trumpet
- Larry Altpeter, Albert Godlis, Frank Saracco, Eddie Bert – trombone
- Sammy Lowe – conductor
- Bob Simpson – recording engineer
