= I'll Come Running Back to You =

Single by Sam Cooke
- B-side: "Forever"
- Released: November 18, 1957
- Recorded: December 12, 1956; Cosimo's Studios (New Orleans, Louisiana)
- Genre: Rhythm and blues, jazz, soul
- Length: 2:10
- Label: Specialty
- Songwriter(s): Sam Cooke
- Producer(s): Bumps Blackwell

Sam Cooke singles chronology
"You Send Me" (1957)	"I'll Come Running Back to You" (1957)	"(I Love You) For Sentimental Reasons" (1957)

"I'll Come Running Back to You" is a song written and recorded by American singer-songwriter Sam Cooke, and released on November 18, 1957 by Specialty Records. The songwriting credit was attributed to "S. Cook" on the label.

The song reached No. 7 on Billboard's "R&B Best Sellers in Stores" chart on January 6, 1958, and then on January 27, 1958, it reached No. 1 on Billboard's "Most Played R&B By Jockeys" chart. It peaked at No. 18 on Billboard's overall "Best Sellers in Stores" chart (the precursor to the Billboard Hot 100) on February 10, 1958.

== Background ==
Cooke originally recorded "I'll Come Running Back to You" on December 12, 1956 at Cosimo Matassa's studio in New Orleans, Louisiana, under the supervision of Specialty Records A&R director Bumps Blackwell.

The song was not initially released, but following the smash success of Cooke's debut single "You Send Me" on Keen Records in late 1957, Speciality owner Art Rupe decided to rush it out as a single. Rupe instructed arranger René Hall to replicate the sound of "You Send Me", which included overdubbing similar instrumentation and background singers. The overdubs were recorded on November 1, 1957 (together with overdubs for "Lovable" and "Forever", also recorded during the earlier New Orleans session), and Rupe mastered the songs four days later. The record was released on November 18, 1957, and Speciality purchased a three-fifths-of-a-page ad in the November 25 issue of Billboard to promote it.

== Personnel ==
Credits adapted from the liner notes to the 2003 compilation Portrait of a Legend: 1951–1964.

- Sam Cooke – vocals
- Earl Palmer – drums
- Warren Myles – piano
- Edgar Blanchard – guitar
- Frank Fields – bass guitar
- Lee Allen – tenor saxophone
- Red Tyler – baritone saxophone

== Charts and certifications ==
=== Weekly charts ===
Chart (1958)	Peak position
U.S. Billboard Best Sellers	18
U.S. Billboard Most Played R&B By Jockeys	1
U.S. Billboard R&B Best Sellers	7

== See also ==
- List of number-one R&B singles of 1958 (U.S.)
