= Sad Mood =

Single by Sam Cooke
- B-side: "Love Me"
- Released: November 8, 1960
- Recorded: October 1, 1960; RCA Studio A (New York City)
- Genre: Rhythm and blues, soul
- Length: 2:00
- Label: RCA Victor
- Songwriter(s): Sam Cooke
- Producer(s): Hugo & Luigi

Sam Cooke singles chronology
"So Glamorous" (1960)	"Sad Mood" (1960)	"That's It – I Quit – I'm Movin' On" (1961)

"Sad Mood" is a song by American singer-songwriter Sam Cooke, released on November 8, 1960 by RCA Victor. Arranged and conducted by Sammy Lowe, the song charted within the top 30 of Billboard's Hot R&B Sides chart and the Billboard Hot 100.

== Background ==
"Sad Mood" was first recorded in Cooke's second singles session for RCA on April 13, 1960. The song was set aside after four takes, with Cooke unhappy with the way it was working. Cooke gave it another go on October 1, 1960, this time with "strings, an all-star rhythm section, an assured vocal, and a Sammy Lowe arrangement." Despite this, Cooke was still largely unhappy with the way it turned out, feeling it missed something. "He had established a way of working with arranger René Hall out on the Coast, and even though Sammy Lowe's string arrangements were not all that different from some of René's, the song still did not say Sam Cooke in the way that some of his earlier Keen hits indelibly, if indefinably, had," said biographer Peter Guralnick. Hugo & Luigi were nonetheless satisfied, and set themselves on making it the follow-up single to "Chain Gang".

"Sad Mood" charted well, but sold only 150,000 copies, roughly one-quarter of the sales of its predecessor.

== Personnel ==
Credits adapted from the liner notes to the 2003 compilation Portrait of a Legend: 1951–1964.

- Sam Cooke — vocals
- Clifton White — guitar
- David Francis — drums
- Milton Hinton — bass guitar
- Ernie Hayes — piano
- Everett Barksdale — violin
- Hinda Barnet — violin
- Alfred Brown — violin
- Max Cahn — violin
- Fred Fradkin — violin
- Archie Levin — violin
- Charles Libove — violin
- Harry Lookofsky — violin
- Ben Miller — violin

== Charts and certifications ==
=== Weekly charts ===
Chart (1960)	Peak position
US Billboard Hot 100	29
US Hot R&B Sides (Billboard)	23
