= Night Beat (Sam Cooke album) =

Studio album by Sam Cooke
- Released: August 1963
- Recorded: February 22–23, 25 1963
- Studios: RCA (Hollywood, California)
- Genres: R&B; lounge; blues; soul
- Length: 37:51
- Label: RCA Victor
- Producer: Hugo & Luigi

Sam Cooke chronology
Mr. Soul (1963)	Night Beat (1963)	3 Great Guys (1964)

Singles from Night Beat
- 1. "Little Red Rooster" Released: 1963

Professional ratings
Review scores
Source	Rating
AllMusic	5/5 stars
Blender	3/5 stars
MusicHound R&B	5/5
Record Mirror	4/5 stars

Night Beat is the tenth studio album by American singer Sam Cooke, released in August 1963 by RCA Victor.

The album title originated from late-night recording sessions by Cooke and a quartet of studio musicians in February 1963. It has been featured in "best-of" lists by contemporary music critics and regarded as one of Cooke's best.

== Background ==
Cooke and his musicians—pianist Ray Johnson, organist Billy Preston (who was 16 at the time of recording), lead guitarist Barney Kessel, alternating drummers Hal Blaine and Ed Hall, bassist Cliff Hils, and Clifton White and René Hall on rhythm guitar—cut Night Beat in three days during late-night recording sessions at RCA Victor Studios in Hollywood in February 1963. "I Lost Everything", "Get Yourself Another Fool" and "Trouble Blues" were laid down on February 22, with the group returning, sans Kessel, the following day to record "Nobody Knows the Trouble I've Seen", "Mean Old World", "Little Red Rooster" and "Laughin' and Clownin'". The last recording session for Night Beat took place on February 25, when the same group, sans Hall and Kessel, reunited to commit "Lost and Lookin'", "Please Don't Drive Me Away", "You Gotta Move", "Fool's Paradise" and "Shake Rattle and Roll" to tape.

== Chart performance ==
The album debuted on Billboard magazine's Top LP's chart in the issue dated September 14, 1963, peaking at No. 62 during a nineteen-week run on the chart.

== Reception ==
According to a retrospective review by John Bush of AllMusic, "Saddled with soaring strings and vocal choruses for maximum crossover potential, Sam Cooke's solo material often masked the most important part of his genius—his glorious voice—so the odd small-group date earns a special recommendation in his discography". He speculated that had Cooke not died prematurely, "there would've been several more sessions like this, but Night Beat is an even richer treasure for its rarity." Al Kooper of Goldmine wrote: "This is intimate Sam Cooke and his favorite musicians having some genuine fun in the studio, with obviously no eye toward ramming up the pop charts ... Each song is like another moody painting always in the appropriate, tasteful frame."

The Guardian included it on their 2007 list of "1000 Albums to Hear Before You Die", writing: "[Cooke] brought a spiritual intensity to every cute mainstream confection he recorded, but his beautiful voice was never more mesmerizing than on this hushed and gracious final album."

== Track listing ==
All songs conducted by René Hall.

Side one
No.	Title	Writer(s)	Length
1.	"Nobody Knows the Trouble I've Seen"	Traditional; arranged by Sam Cooke	3:22
2.	"Lost and Lookin'"	James W. Alexander, Lowell Jordan	2:09
3.	"Mean Old World"	Cooke	3:44
4.	"Please Don't Drive Me Away"	Charles Brown, Jesse Ervin	2:12
5.	"I Lost Everything"	Ella Tate	3:19
6.	"Get Yourself Another Fool"	Ernest Monroe Tucker, Frank A. Haywood	4:00

Side two
No.	Title	Writer(s)	Length
1.	"Little Red Rooster"	Willie Dixon	2:50
2.	"Laughin' and Clownin'"	Cooke	3:34
3.	"Trouble Blues"	Brown	3:18
4.	"You Gotta Move"	Traditional	2:35
5.	"Fool's Paradise"	Johnny Fuller, Robert Geddins, David Avid	2:32
6.	"Shake, Rattle and Roll"	Charles Calhoun	3:22

== Personnel ==
All credits adapted from The RCA Albums Collection (2011) liner notes.

- Sam Cooke – vocals
- René Hall – conducting, guitar
- Clifton White, Barney Kessel – guitar
- Cliff Hils – bass
- Sharky Hall – drums, tambourine
- Hal Blaine – drums
- Ray Johnson – piano
- Billy Preston – organ
- Dave Hassinger – recording engineer

== Charts ==
Chart (1963)	Peak position
US Billboard Top LPs	62
