= I Thank God (album) =

1960 Sam Cooke compilation album

Compilation album by Sam Cooke, The Gospel Harmonettes, and The Original Blind Boys
- Released: 1960
- Recorded: 1954–1959
- Studio: Various studios
- Genre: Gospel
- Length: 31:25
- Language: English
- Label: Keen

I Thank God is a 1960 compilation album of gospel songs by Sam Cooke along with The Gospel Harmonettes and The Original Blind Boys, released on Keen Records.

== Reception ==
The editorial staff of AllMusic Guide scored this album three out of five stars, with reviewer Ron Wynn writing that "those who feel that Cooke's gospel was his finest material will have that opinion validated" by this compilation. A review of the compilation in Billboard supposed that this would be a "sock sales success" in the Christian music market and a later review of the single release for "I Thank God" considered it to have very strong sales potential.

== Track listing ==
Side one

1. Sam Cooke – "I Thank God" – 2:56
2. Blind Boys – "You Got to Move" – 2:12
3. Gospel Harmonettes – "Jericho Walls" – 3:15
4. Sam Cooke – "That's Heaven to Me" – 2:51
5. Gospel Harmonettes – "Love Lifted Me" (James Rowe and Howard E. Smith) – 2:50
6. Blind Boys – "Coming Up Through the Years" – 2:55

Side two

7. Sam Cooke – "Steal Away" (Wallace Willis) – 2:16
8. Gospel Harmonettes – "Trust and Obey" (John H. Sammis) – 2:00
9. Blind Boys – "This Friend Jesus" – 1:57
10. Sam Cooke – "Deep River" (traditional) – 2:47
11. Gospel Harmonettes – "God's Goodness" – 2:44
12. Blind Boys – "Oh, Lord Fix It" – 2:42

A 2017 Vinyl Lovers reissue includes two bonus tracks: side A ends with Cooke's 1961 performance of "Swing Low, Sweet Chariot" (Willis) and side B ends with Sam Cooke & The Soul Stirrers doing "Farther Along" (Jesse Randall Baxter, Jr.) from 1954.

A compact disc re-release on Soul Jam also adds several bonus tracks

13. Sam Cooke – "Swing Low, Sweet Chariot" – 3:02
14. Sam Cooke – "Ol' Man River" – 2:38
15. Sam Cooke – "The Bells of St. Mary’s" – 2:18
16. Sam Cooke – "Pray" – 2:11
17. Sam Cooke & The Soul Stirrers – "Touch the Hem of His Garment" – 2:05
18. Sam Cooke & The Soul Stirrers – "Jesus, Wash Away My Troubles" – 2:07
19. Sam Cooke & The Soul Stirrers – "Must Jesus Bear This Cross Alone" – 2:50
20. Sam Cooke & The Soul Stirrers – "Farther Along" – 2:27

== Personnel ==
The original LP includes no credits, but the Soul Jam and Vinyl Lovers re-releases include the following personnel listing, with proposed members of The Gospel Harmonettes and The Original Blind Boys:

Sam Cooke tracks:

- Sam Cooke – vocals
- Red Callender – bass guitar
- Earl Palmer – drums
- Cliff White – guitar

Tracks recorded between 1958 and 1959.

The Gospel Harmonettes:

- Dorothy Love Coates – lead vocals
- Mildred Miller Howard – mezzo-soprano
- Vera Kalb – soprano
- Willie Mae Newberry Garth – vocals
- Odessa Edwards – vocals
- Herbert "Pee Wee" Pickard – piano

Tracks recorded between 1956 and 1958.

The Original Blind Boys:

- Clarence Fountain – vocals
- Johnny Fields – vocals
- J. T. Hutton – vocals
- George Scott – vocals
- Ollice Thomas – vocals

Tracks recorded between 1954 and 1958.
