= That's Where It's At (song) =

Single by Sam Cooke
- B-side: "Cousin of Mine"
- Released: September 16, 1964
- Recorded: August 20, 1964; RCA Studios (Los Angeles, California)
- Genre: Soul, R&B
- Length: 2:35
- Label: RCA 8426
- Songwriters: Sam Cooke, J. W. Alexander
- Producer: Al Schmitt

Sam Cooke singles chronology
| "Good Times" (1964) | "That's Where It's At" (1964) | "Shake" (1964) |

"That's Where It's At" is a song written by Sam Cooke and J.W. Alexander. Recorded by Cooke, it was released as a single in September 1964.

The song was recorded in 32 takes on August 20, 1963 at the RCA studio in Los Angeles, and released the following month. The backing band on the single consisted of trumpeter John Anderson, bassist Harper Cosby, trombonist John "Streamline" Ewing, drummer June Gardner, saxophonist Jewell Grant, violinist Darel Terwilliger, and guitarists René Hall and Bobby Womack.

It was not initially much of a commercial success, charting no higher than 93 on the Billboard Hot 100. By Cooke's personal standards it was similarly low, especially when compared to his previous and following singles ("Good Times" and "Shake", respectively), both of which were comfortably in the Top 20. However, the song has also garnered critical acclaim in the decades since. It is ranked 876th in American music critic Dave Marsh's 1989 list, The Heart of Rock and Soul: The 1001 Greatest Singles Ever Made.

| Chart (1964) | Peak position |
|---|---|
| Billboard Hot 100 | 93 |
