= Nothing Can Change This Love =

Single by Sam Cooke

from the album Mr. Soul
- B-side: "Somebody Have Mercy"
- Released: September 11, 1962
- Recorded: August 23, 1962; RCA Studio 1 (Hollywood, California)
- Genre: Rhythm and blues, soul
- Length: 2:33
- Label: RCA Victor
- Songwriter: Sam Cooke
- Producer: Hugo & Luigi

Sam Cooke singles chronology
"Bring It On Home to Me" (1962)	"Nothing Can Change This Love" (1962)	"Send Me Some Lovin'" (1962)

"Nothing Can Change This Love" is a song by American singer-songwriter Sam Cooke. It was released as a single on September 11, 1962 by RCA Victor. The song peaked at No. 2 on Billboard's Hot R&B Singles chart, and also charted at No. 12 on the Hot 100. The song was later included on the album Mr. Soul.

== Background ==
Cooke had first attempted to record "Nothing Can Change This Love" in an earlier session on February 15, 1962, with a decidedly more doo-wop flair. Recorded the night before he was to return to the road for tours, Cooke was determined to record the song, but was unable to get into the RCA studio until past midnight. The song was recorded in eight takes.

RCA issued the song as a single two and a half weeks later, and its sales rivaled that of Cooke's most recent success, "Bring It On Home to Me".

== Personnel ==
"Nothing Can Change This Love" was recorded on August 23, 1962 at RCA Studio 1 in Hollywood, California. The musicians also recorded "I'm Gonna Forget About You" the same day. The session was conducted and arranged by René Hall, producers were Hugo & Luigi. Credits adapted from the liner notes to the 2003 compilation Portrait of a Legend: 1951–1964.

- Sam Cooke – vocals
- Edward Beal – piano
- René Hall – guitar
- Earl Palmer – drums
- Joseph Coppin – cello
- Frederick Seykora – cello
- Allan Harshman – viola
- Samuel Boghossian – viola
- Israel Baker – violin
- Robert Barené – violin
- John DeVoogdt – violin
- Harold Dickterow – violin
- Elliot Fisher – violin
- William Kurasch – violin
- Leonard Malarsky – violin
- Gareth Nuttycombe – violin
- Isadore Roman – violin
- Ralph Schaeffer – violin
- Darrell Terwilliger – violin

== Charts and certifications ==
=== Weekly charts ===
Chart (1962)	Peak position
US Billboard Hot 100	12
US Hot R&B Singles (Billboard)	2

=== Certifications ===
Region	Certification	Certified units/sales
New Zealand (RMNZ)	Gold	15,000^{‡}
^{‡} Sales+streaming figures based on certification alone.

== Popular culture ==
- The song appears prominently in the Hulu miniseries 11.22.63, based on the novel by Stephen King.
