= Having a Party (Sam Cooke song) =

Single by Sam Cooke
- B-side: "Bring It On Home to Me"
- Released: May 8, 1962
- Recorded: April 26, 1962
- Studio: RCA (Hollywood, California)
- Genre: Rhythm and blues; soul
- Length: 2:23
- Label: RCA Victor
- Songwriter(s): Sam Cooke
- Producer(s): Hugo & Luigi

Sam Cooke singles chronology
"Twistin' in the Kitchen with Dinah" (1962)	"Having a Party" (1962)	"Somebody Have Mercy" (1962)

"Having a Party" is a song by American singer-songwriter Sam Cooke, released on May 8, 1962, by RCA Victor. Produced by Hugo & Luigi and arranged and conducted by René Hall, the song was the A-side to "Bring It On Home to Me". The song peaked at number four on the US Billboard Hot R&B Sides chart, and also charted at number 17 on the Billboard Hot 100.

== Background ==
"Having a Party", like its B-side, "Bring It On Home to Me", was written while Cooke was on tour for Henry Wynn. While in Atlanta, Cooke called co-producer Luigi Creatore and pitched both numbers; he was sold and booked an immediate recording session in Los Angeles scheduled for two weeks later. The session's mood "matched the title" of the song, according to biographer Peter Guralnick, as many friends had been invited. "It was a very happy session," recalled engineer Al Schmitt. "Everybody was just having a ball. We were getting people out there [on the floor], and some of the outtakes were hilarious, there was so much ad lib that went on." "Having a Party" was recorded first, as it was the "lighter" of the two songs, and it was completed in twelve takes. Hall assembled an eighteen-piece backing group, "composed of six violins, two violas, two cellos, and a sax, plus a seven-piece rhythm section that included two percussionists, two bassists, two guitars, and a piano." Lou Rawls, former Keen assistant A&R rep Fred Smith and J.W. Alexander join in to provide backing vocals and handclaps to the chorus.

"Having a Party" became the closing song of Cooke's live performances from the time it was recorded to his death. These concerts would typically end with all other acts joining Cooke and company onstage, throwing confetti while Cooke worked the audience to "keep on having that party" after the show is over. A version can be heard on Cooke's posthumous live recording, Live at the Harlem Square Club, 1963.

== Personnel ==
"Having a Party" was recorded on April 26, 1962, at RCA Studio 1 in Hollywood, California. The engineer present was Al Schmitt, and the session was conducted and arranged by René Hall. The musicians also recorded "Bring It On Home to Me" the same day. Credits adapted from the liner notes to the 2003 compilation Portrait of a Legend: 1951–1964.

- Sam Cooke – vocals
- Lou Rawls – backing vocals
- Clifton White – guitar
- Tommy Tedesco – guitar
- René Hall – guitar
- Adolphus Asbrook – bass guitar
- Ray Pohlman – bass guitar
- Ernie Freeman – piano
- Frank Capp – drums, percussion
- William Green – saxophone
- Cecil Figelski – cello
- Armand Kaproff – cello
- Wilbert Nuttycombe – viola
- Irving Weinper – viola
- Myron Sandler – violin
- Joseph Saxon – violin
- Ralph Schaeffer – violin
- Marshall Sosson – violin
- Elliot Fisher – violin
- Marvin Limonick – violin

== Rod Stewart version ==
In 1993, Rod Stewart covered the song during his session of MTV Unplugged. It was included on the live album Unplugged...and Seated and released as a single. It charted in the US in early 1994 reaching the top 40 on the Billboard Hot 100 peaking at 36, and in the top 10 of the AC chart peaking at 6.

== Other versions ==
The "Crescent Street Stompers" version reached No. 43 in Canada in 1976. Luther Vandross covered the song during the bridge on his 1982 hit "Bad Boy/Having a Party"; however, only the chorus is sung in this version, and new words were added to it (e.g. the closing line "you can't go"). A cover by Tina Turner is a B-Side of the 1986 release of her single "Two People". The Pointer Sisters covered it on their fourth album, Having a Party (1977). Southside Johnny and the Asbury Jukes covered it on their live album Reach Up and Touch the Sky (1981), and in 2020 still include it in their setlist. Bruce Springsteen covered it in a medley with The E Street Shuffle on the live album Hammersmith Odeon, London '75 (which was released in 2006). Springsteen and Southside Johnny have also been known to play the cover whenever they appear on stage together. Nathaniel Rateliff has used a version of the song as his closing number at live shows, and it is included in the 2017 release Live at Red Rocks.

== Charts and certifications ==
=== Weekly charts ===
==== Sam Cooke version ====
Chart (1962)	Peak position
Canada (CHUM Chart)	30
US Billboard Hot 100	17
US Hot R&B Sides (Billboard)	4

==== Rod Stewart version ====
Chart (1994)	Peak position
Canada Top Singles (RPM)	12
Canada Adult Contemporary (RPM)	3
Iceland (Íslenski Listinn Topp 40)	7
US Billboard Hot 100	36
US Adult Contemporary (Billboard)	6

=== Year-end charts ===
Chart (1994)	Position
Canada Top Singles (RPM)	81
US Adult Contemporary (Billboard)	20
