= You Were Made for Me (Sam Cooke song) =

1958 song performed by Sam Cooke

Single by Sam Cooke

from the album Hit Kit
- B-side: "Lonely Island"
- Released: March 24, 1958
- Recorded: June 1, 1957
- Studio: Radio Recorders (Hollywood, California)
- Genre: Rhythm and blues, soul
- Length: 2:31
- Label: Keen
- Songwriter(s): Sam Cooke
- Producer(s): Bumps Blackwell

Sam Cooke singles chronology
"That's All I Need to Know" (1958)	"You Were Made for Me" (1958)	"Stealing Kisses" (1958)

"You Were Made for Me" is a song by American singer-songwriter Sam Cooke, released on March 24, 1958 by Keen Records. The song peaked at number seven on Billboard's Hot R&B Sides chart, and also charted within the top 40 of the Billboard Hot 100.

Not to be confused with the song of the same name composed by Mitch Murray and recorded 1963 by Freddie & The Dreamers.

== Charts ==
Chart (1958)	Peak position
US Billboard Hot 100	39
US Hot R&B Sides (Billboard)	7
