= Cupid (Sam Cooke song) =

1961 single by Sam Cooke

Single by Sam Cooke

from the album The Best of Sam Cooke
- B-side: "Farewell My Darling"
- Released: May 16, 1961
- Recorded: April 14, 1961
- Studio: RCA (Hollywood, California)
- Genre: Rhythm and blues
- Length: 2:30
- Label: RCA Victor
- Songwriter: Sam Cooke
- Producer: Hugo & Luigi

Sam Cooke singles chronology
"That's It, I Quit, I'm Moving On" (1961)	"Cupid" (1961)	"Feel It" (1961)

"Cupid" is a song by the American singer Sam Cooke, released on May 16, 1961. It charted at number 17 on the Billboard Hot 100 and number 20 on the Hot R&B Sides chart; the track performed best in the United Kingdom, peaking at number seven on the UK Singles Chart. The song is featured on Cooke's greatest hits album, The Best of Sam Cooke (1962).

== History ==
Cooke's producers had asked him to write a song for Sandy Stewart, who they had seen on The Perry Como Show—but once they heard her sing more than one song, they kept "Cupid" for Cooke himself. The song was recorded at Cooke's debut session at RCA Records in Los Angeles, produced by Cooke and Hugo & Luigi, but only Luigi Creatore was able to attend as co-producer Hugo Peretti was afraid of flying.

René Hall arranged the piece with French horn and strings. Personnel included Cooke's session regulars Clifton White and Hall on guitar, Clifford Hills on bass, Earl Palmer on drums and Joseph Gibbons on guitar and banjo. Cooke's original idea was to bring in the Sims Twins, the gospel duo of Bobbie and Kenneth Sims, to perform backing vocals mimicking the sound of a bow shooting an arrow.

The final version was chosen after seven takes. Cooke left for a tour of the West Indies shortly after completing the recording.

== Reception ==
An AllMusic critic described the track as a "perfect pop song" which combines "Latin, R&B, jazz, and mainstream pop elements".

== Charts and certifications ==
"Cupid" was ranked at number 452 in Rolling Stone magazine's list of the "500 Greatest Songs of All Time" in 2004 and at number 458 in 2010.

=== Weekly charts ===
Chart (1961 - Sam Cooke)	Peak position
UK Singles (Official Charts)	7
US Billboard Hot 100	17
US Hot R&B/Hip-Hop Songs (Billboard)	20
US Cash Box Top 100	16

=== Year-end charts ===
Chart (1961)	Rank
UK	74

Chart (1969–70 – Johnny Nash)	Peak position
Canada RPM Top Singles	30
Canada RPM Adult Contemporary	32
Ireland (IRMA)	19
UK Singles (Official Charts)	6
US Billboard Hot 100	39

Chart (1976 – Tony Orlando and Dawn)	Peak position
Canada RPM Adult Contemporary	5
Canada RPM Top Singles	27
New Zealand (RIANZ)	22
U.S. Billboard Hot 100	22

Chart (1976)	Rank
Canada	190

Chart (1980 – The Spinners)	Peak position
Australia (Kent Music Report)	17
Canada Top Singles (RPM)	20
Canada RPM Adult Contemporary	1
Ireland (IRMA)	11
UK Singles (Official Charts)	4
US Billboard Hot 100	4
US Adult Contemporary (Billboard)	3
US Hot R&B/Hip-Hop Songs (Billboard)	5

Chart (1980)	Rank
Australia	132
UK	74
US Billboard Hot 100	29
US Billboard R&B	50
US Cash Box	32

Chart (2008 – Amy Winehouse)	Peak position
Switzerland (Schweizer Hitparade)	49

== Certifications ==
Certifications
Region	Certification	Certified units/sales
New Zealand (RMNZ)	Gold	15,000^{‡}
^{‡} Sales+streaming figures based on certification alone.

== Cover versions ==
"Cupid"

Single by Johnny Nash

from the album Hold Me Tight
- A-side: "Hold Me Tight" (original)
- B-side: "People in Love" (reissue)
- Released: 1969
- Recorded: 1969
- Genre: Reggae, rocksteady
- Length: 3:29
- Label: JAD
- Songwriter: Sam Cooke
- Producers: Johnny Nash, Arthur Jenkins

Johnny Nash singles chronology
"Love and Peace" (1969)	"Cupid" (1969)	"(What A) Groovey Feeling" (1970)

"Cupid"

Single by Tony Orlando and Dawn

from the album To Be with You
- B-side: "You're Growin' on Me"
- Released: January 1976
- Genre: Pop
- Length: 3:02
- Label: Elektra
- Songwriter: Sam Cooke
- Producers: Dave Appell, Hank Medress

Tony Orlando and Dawn singles chronology
"Skybird" (1975)	"Cupid" (1976)	"Midnight Love Affair" (1976)

"Cupid/I've Loved You for a Long Time"

Single by The Spinners

from the album Love Trippin'
- B-side: "Pipedream" "Body Language" (Germany/Sweden)
- Released: May 1980
- Genre: R&B, disco
- Length: 3:55 (single version); 5:32 (album version)
- Label: Atlantic
- Songwriters: Sam Cooke ("Cupid"), Michael Zager ("I've Loved You for a Long Time")
- Producer: Michael Zager

The Spinners singles chronology
"Working My Way Back to You" (1979)	"Cupid/I've Loved You for a Long Time" (1980)	"Now That You're Mine Again" (1980)

- In 1964, Johnny Rivers covered the song on his album In Action.
- In 1965, The Supremes covered the song on their tribute album We Remember Sam Cooke.
- In 1970, Johnny Nash's rocksteady and reggae version, released in late 1969, peaked at number 39 on the Hot 100 on January 24, 1970. In the United Kingdom, this version peaked at number 6 in May 1969. It was the B-side to his hit song "Hold Me Tight".
- In 1975, Gary Glitter covered the song on his album G.G..
- In 1976, Dawn's cover peaked at number 22 on the Hot 100 on March 20–27, 1976, and number two on the Easy Listening chart.
- In 1980, the song was covered, in a medley with Michael Zager's "I've Loved You For a Long Time", by The Spinners. This version went to number four on July 19 - August 2, 1980, on the Hot 100, thus becoming the highest-charting version on the Hot 100, and number five on the R&B chart.
- Otis Redding was also known for covering a number of Cooke's songs including "Cupid". His cover was included on the 1993 box set Otis! The Definitive Otis Redding.
- In 2006, Amy Winehouse covered the song on her album Back to Black.

== Other ==
- In 1970, the song's opening lyrics featured in Edwin Starr's "Running Back and Forth" from War & Peace.
- This song's melody is interpolated in Carly Rae Jepsen's song "Tiny Little Bows" from her second studio album, Kiss (2012).

== Sources ==
- Guralnick, Peter (2005). Dream Boogie: The Triumph of Sam Cooke. Little, Brown. ISBN 978-0-316-37794-2. OCLC 57393650.
- Wolff, Daniel (1995). You Send Me: The Life and Times of Sam Cooke. William Morrow. ISBN 978-0-688-12403-8. OCLC 30703619.
