= Shake (Sam Cooke song) =

1964 single by Sam Cooke

Single by Sam Cooke
- B-side: "A Change Is Gonna Come"
- Released: December 22, 1964
- Recorded: November 16, 1964
- Studio: RCA (Hollywood, California)
- Genre: Soul
- Label: RCA (8486)
- Songwriter: Sam Cooke
- Producers: Sam Cooke; Al Schmitt

Sam Cooke singles chronology
"That's Where It's At" (1964)	"Shake" (1964)	"It's Got the Whole World Shakin'" (1965)

"Shake" is a song written and recorded by Sam Cooke. It was recorded at the last recording session Cooke had before his death on December 11, 1964. In the U.S., the song became a posthumous Billboard, Top 10 hit for Cooke, peaking at number seven in February 1965, as well as peaking at number two for three weeks on the Cashbox R&B charts.

Cash Box described it as "a sensational rock-a-twist affair."

== Other renditions ==
"Shake"

Song by Otis Redding

from the album Otis Blue
- Released: 1965
- Recorded: 1965
- Studio: Stax, Memphis, Tennessee
- Genre: Soul
- Length: 2:35
- Label: Volt/Atco (V-149)
- Songwriter: Sam Cooke

The song was also recorded by Eric Burdon and The Animals, Otis Redding, Ike and Tina Turner, Rod Stewart, and The Supremes on We Remember Sam Cooke (1965). Redding's version was elected to the "500 Songs that Shaped Rock and Roll " by the Rock and Roll Hall of Fame and Museum. Redding performed the song backed by Booker T. & the M.G.'s at the Monterey Pop Festival in June 1967. Recordings of the performance have been released by Reprise (1970) and Rhino (1997) records.

In 1966, the British TV show Ready Steady Goes Live (the live version of Ready Steady Go!), devoted a whole programme to a live performance by Redding, who regularly covered many of Cooke's songs. One of the highlights was a version of "Shake" on which Redding was joined by Eric Burdon and Chris Farlowe.

The song was covered by the Small Faces. It was a prominent part of their early live repertoire and featured as the opening track on their debut album Small Faces, and re-released on the Decca Anthology collection. A live version can be found on their 1999 album The BBC Sessions.

Eddie and the Hot Rods released a version of the song as the B-side to their 1976 single, "Teenage Depression".

Ian Moss released a version of "Shake" as the lead single from his sixth studio album, Soul on West 53rd.

The song was sampled by rapper Game on his 2011 album, The R.E.D. Album.
