= Bring It On Home to Me =

1962 single by Sam Cooke

Single by Sam Cooke

from the album The Best of Sam Cooke
- A-side: "Having a Party"
- Released: May 8, 1962
- Recorded: April 26, 1962
- Studio: RCA (Hollywood, California)
- Genre: Soul; pop; rhythm and blues; gospel
- Length: 2:37
- Label: RCA Victor
- Songwriter: Sam Cooke
- Producer: Hugo & Luigi

Sam Cooke singles chronology
"Twistin' in the Kitchen with Dinah" (1962)	"Bring It On Home to Me" (1962)	"Somebody Have Mercy" (1962)

"Bring It On Home to Me" is a song by the American soul singer Sam Cooke, released on May 8, 1962, by RCA Victor. Produced by Hugo & Luigi, and arranged and conducted by René Hall, the song was the B-side to "Having a Party". The song peaked at number two on Billboard's Hot R&B Sides chart, and also charted at number 13 on the Billboard Hot 100. The song has become a pop standard, covered by numerous artists of different genres. It is one of The Rock and Roll Hall of Fame's 500 Songs that Shaped Rock and Roll.

== Background ==
"Bring It On Home to Me", like its A-side, "Having a Party", was written while Cooke was on tour for Henry Wynn. The song was initially offered to fellow singer Dee Clark, who turned it down. While in Atlanta, Cooke called co-producer Luigi Creatore and pitched both numbers; Creatore liked the songs, and booked a recording session in Los Angeles, scheduled for two weeks later. The session's mood "matched the title" of the song, according to biographer Peter Guralnick, as many friends had been invited. "It was a very happy session," recalled engineer Al Schmitt. "Everybody was just having a ball. We were getting people out there [on the floor], and some of the outtakes were hilarious, there was so much ad lib that went on." René Hall assembled an eighteen-piece backing group, "composed of six violins, two violas, two cellos, and a sax, plus a seven-piece rhythm section that included two percussionists, two bassists, two guitars, and a piano."

The song is a significant reworking of the 1959 single "I Want to Go Home" by Charles Brown and Amos Milburn, and it retains the gospel flavor and call-and-response format; the song differs significantly in that its refrain ("Bring it to me, bring your sweet lovin', bring it on home to me") is overtly secular. The song was the first serious nod to his gospel roots ("[He] felt that he needed more weight, that that light shit wouldn't sustain him," said J.W. Alexander). The song was aiming for a sound similar to Cooke's former group, the Soul Stirrers. The original, unreleased first take includes vocals from Lou Rawls, J.W. Alexander, Fred Smith (former assistant A&R rep at Keen Records), and "probably" the Sims Twins. A second, final take leaves Lou Rawls as the only echoing voice.

== Personnel ==
"Bring It On Home to Me" was recorded on April 26, 1962, at RCA Studio 1 in the Hollywood area of Los Angeles, California. The engineer present was Al Schmitt, and the session was conducted and arranged by René Hall. The musicians also recorded "Having a Party" the same day. Credits adapted from the liner notes to the 2003 compilation Portrait of a Legend: 1951–1964.

- Sam Cooke – vocals
- Lou Rawls – backing vocals
- Clifton White – guitar
- Tommy Tedesco – guitar
- René Hall – guitar
- Adolphus Asbrook – bass guitar
- Ray Pohlman – bass guitar
- Ernie Freeman – piano
- Frank Capp – drums, percussion
- William Green – saxophone
- Cecil Figelski – cello
- Armand Kaproff – cello
- Wilbert Nuttycombe – viola
- Irving Weinper – viola
- Myron Sandler – violin
- Joseph Saxon – violin
- Ralph Schaeffer – violin
- Marshall Sosson – violin
- Elliot Fisher – violin
- Marvin Limonick – violin

== Later versions ==
"Bring It On Home to Me"

Single by the Animals

from the album Animal Tracks (American album)
- B-side: "For Miss Caulker"
- Released: 9 April 1965
- Recorded: 20 March 1965
- Genre: Rhythm and Blues
- Length: 2:43
- Label: Columbia
- Songwriter: Sam Cooke
- Producer: Mickie Most

The Animals singles chronology
"Don't Let Me Be Misunderstood" (1965)	"Bring It On Home to Me" (1965)	"We Gotta Get out of This Place" (1965)

"Bring It On Home to Me"

Single by Mickey Gilley

from the album Gilley's Smokin'
- B-side: "How's My Ex Treating You"
- Released: June 1976
- Recorded: May 1976
- Genre: Country rock
- Length: 2:23
- Label: Playboy 6075
- Songwriter: Sam Cooke
- Producer: Eddie Kilroy

Mickey Gilley singles chronology
"Don't the Girls All Get Prettier at Closing Time" (1976)	"Bring It On Home to Me" (1976)	"Lawdy Miss Clawdy" (1976)

The most significant later versions of the song include recordings by:

- The Animals in 1965 as a single, recorded in tribute to the then-recently killed Cooke. It was their last single to include original organist Alan Price. Their version reached number 7 in the UK and number 32 on the US Hot 100. Cash Box said it is performed in "an effective funky, emotion-packed style." Record World said that "British clan gives tough treatment to the terrific Sam Cooke song. They pound out that beat with increasing intensity."
- Mickey Gilley hit number 1 on the country chart in 1976 with his recording taken from his 1976 album Gilley's Smokin'. He also reached number 101 on the Billboard Pop chart.
- The Chicks (originally known as the Dixie Chicks) stripped the song down to vocals, finger snaps and plucked bass fiddle in 1990 on the album Thank Heavens for Dale Evans. Their version, less than two minutes long, revealed their blues-style harmonies.
- Aaradhna covered the song on her 2008 album Sweet Soul Music. The recording was certified Gold by Recorded Music NZ (RMNZ) in 2023.

== Charts and certifications ==
=== Original version ===
Chart (1962)	Peak position
US Billboard Hot 100	13
US Hot R&B Sides (Billboard)	2

Region	Certification	Certified units/sales
United Kingdom (BPI)	Gold	400,000^{‡}
^{‡} Sales+streaming figures based on certification alone.

=== The Animals version ===
Year	Chart	Position
1965	Pop Singles Chart	32
1965	UK Singles Chart	7
1965	Canada	7
1965	Finland	19
1965	Netherlands	3
1965	Sweden	1

=== Eddie Floyd version ===
Year	Chart	Position
1968	Black Singles Chart	4
1968	Pop Singles Chart	17
1968	Canada	24

=== Lou Rawls version ===
Year	Chart	Position
1970	Black Singles Chart	45
1970	Pop Singles Chart	96

=== Mickey Gilley version ===
Chart (1976)	Peak position
US Hot Country Songs (Billboard)	1
US Bubbling Under Hot 100 (Billboard)	1
Canadian RPM Country Tracks	1

=== Year-end charts ===
Chart (1976)	Position
US Hot Country Songs (Billboard)	31

== Legacy ==
Smokey Robinson was inspired by the slow-burning pace and close harmony of "Bring It On Home to Me" to write "You've Really Got a Hold on Me" for his group The Miracles. In acknowledgment of the inspiration, when performing "You've Really Got a Hold on Me" live the Miracles often incorporated an excerpt of "Bring It On Home to Me", one instance of which is captured on The Miracles Recorded Live on Stage.

Green Day lifted the song's melody for the verses of their song "Brutal Love".

== In popular culture ==
- The song is featured in the second to last scene of the 1987 movie Adventures in Babysitting.
- The song appears in the opening scene of the 2017 film Gerald's Game.
- The song is featured in the 2017 film Guardians of the Galaxy Vol. 2.
- The song is featured in Episode 5 of the 2016 American science fiction thriller miniseries 11.22.63.
- The song is featured in a 2018 Walmart Christmas commercial about a teddy bear that wanders the store's aisles at night until he is brought home to a little girl for Christmas.
- The TV show Ozark featured the song in episode 1 of season 4, during the pool scene with Ruth, Jonah and Wyatt at the Lazy-O. The song also appears in season 4 episode 14, "A Hard Way to Go".
- The song is used briefly in season 1 episode 5 of the American sports comedy Ted Lasso.
- Michael Bublé performed the song during Canada's opening ceremony of the 2026 FIFA World Cup.
