= Twistin' the Night Away =

1962 single by Sam Cooke

Single by Sam Cooke

from the album Twistin' the Night Away
- B-side: "One More Time"
- Released: January 9, 1962
- Recorded: December 18, 1961
- Studio: RCA (Hollywood, California)
- Genre: Rhythm and blues
- Length: 2:42
- Label: RCA Victor 0566 (USA)
- Songwriter: Sam Cooke
- Producers: Hugo & Luigi, Engineer: Al Schmitt

Sam Cooke singles chronology
"Feel It" (1961)	"Twistin' the Night Away" (1962)	"Chain Gang" b/w "Cupid" (1962)

"Twistin' the Night Away" is a song written and recorded by Sam Cooke. It was recorded on 18 December 1961 and released as a single in 1962. It became very popular, charting in the top ten of both the Billboard Hot 100 (#9) and Billboard's R&B chart (#1). "Twistin' the Night Away" was successful overseas as well, peaking at #6 on the UK Singles Chart.

The song was recorded with The Wrecking Crew as session musicians, including Rene Hall as band leader, Red Callender on bass, Earl Palmer on drums, Tommy Tedesco and Clifton White on guitars, Ed Beal on piano, John Kelson, John Ewing and Jewell Grant on saxophone and Stuart Williamson on trumpet.

== Personnel ==
- Sam Cooke – vocals
- René Hall – guitar, arrangement, conducting
- Clifton White, Tommy Tedesco – guitar
- Red Callender – bass guitar
- Earl Palmer – drums
- Eddie Beal – piano
- Stuart Williamson – trumpet
- John Ewing – trombone
- Jewell Grant – baritone saxophone

== Chart history ==
=== Weekly charts ===
Chart (1962)	Peak position
New Zealand (Lever Hit Parade)	6
UK singles chart	6
U.S. Billboard Hot 100	9
U.S. Billboard R&B Singles	1
U.S. Cashbox Top 100	6

=== Year-end charts ===
Chart (1962)	Rank
UK	55
U.S. Billboard Hot 100	23
U.S. Cash Box	30

== Certifications ==
Region	Certification	Certified units/sales
United Kingdom (BPI)	Silver	200,000^{‡}
^{‡} Sales+streaming figures based on certification alone.

== Rod Stewart version ==
"Twistin' the Night Away"

Single by Rod Stewart

from the album Never a Dull Moment
- B-side: "True Blue" / "Lady Day"
- Released: August 1973; July 1987 (re-recorded version)
- Recorded: 1972; 1987 (re-recorded version)
- Genre: Rock and roll
- Length: 3:13 (album version); 4:10 (1987 re-recording)
- Label: Mercury
- Songwriter: Sam Cooke

Rod Stewart singles chronology
"Angel" (1972)	"Twistin' the Night Away" (1973)	"Oh! No Not My Baby" (1973)

In 1973, Rod Stewart released his version as the third single from Never a Dull Moment, his fourth album. This version achieved marginal success, peaking at #59 on the Billboard Hot 100. In 1987, he re-recorded the song for the soundtrack to the film Innerspace. When released as a single in the summer of 1987, this version hit #80 on the Hot 100.

=== Track listing ===
1. "Twistin' The Night Away" - 3:15
2. "True Blue" - 3:29

=== 1987 Re-recorded version (from the film, Innerspace) ===
1. "Twistin' The Night Away" — Rod Stewart (4:10)
2. "Let's Get Small" — Jerry Goldsmith (5:57)

=== Charts ===
Original release

Chart (1973)	Peak position
Canadian Singles Chart	76
US Billboard Hot 100	59
US Cash Box Top 100	35

Reissue

Chart (1987)	Peak position
Canadian Singles Chart	54
US Billboard Hot 100	80

== Divine version ==
"Twistin' The Night Away"

Single by Divine
- B-side: "A Divine Good Time"
- Released: 1985
- Genre: Hi-NRG, house
- Label: Proto Records
- Songwriter: Sam Cooke

Divine singles chronology
"Walk Like a Man" (1985)	"Twistin' The Night Away" (1985)	"Hard Magic" (1985)

Divine recorded "Twistin' The Night Away" and released it as the second single from his album Maid in England in 1985.

=== Track listing ===
1. "Twistin' The Night Away (Dance Version)" — 6:53
2. "Twistin' The Night Away (Instrumental)" — 6:10
3. "A Divine Good Time" — 3:52

=== Charts ===
Chart (1985)	Peak position
UK Singles Chart	47

== Other cover versions ==
- The song was also covered by the Motown group, the Marvelettes. Their version of the song appeared on the 1962 album, The Marvelettes Sing Smash Hits of 1962.
- The Glitter Band covered the song in 1974, on their debut album "Hey!".
- The song was recorded by Hutti Heita as a dark psytrance track in 2009.
- The Delltones released a version of ("Twistin' The Night Away") on their 1984 album ("Bop 'Till Ya Drop"), and the song was also released on their 40th anniversary compilation album ("The Big Four O") in 1998.
- The Blue Riddim Band recorded a cover for their 1981 album Restless Spirit.

== Elsewhere in popular culture ==
- Cooke's version also appeared in the 1978 classic Animal House, the 1987 film Innerspace, the 2011 film The Green Hornet, and the 2025 film The Monkey.
- The Shins titled their third album Wincing the Night Away in an apparent reference to the song.
- The song appeared in a dance sequence in Umbrella Academy.

== See also ==
- Twist songs
- List of number-one R&B singles of 1962 (U.S.)
