= J. W. Alexander (musician) =

American musician

James Woodie Alexander II (January 21, 1916 – July 8, 1996), was an American singer, musician, songwriter, record producer and entrepreneur who was a key figure in the development of gospel and soul music, most notably through his close association with Sam Cooke.

== Biography ==
Alexander was born in Hamilton, Mississippi, but by his early teens was living in Tulsa, Oklahoma, and started singing with local gospel groups. At the age of 18 he joined and began managing the Silver Moon Quartet, from Independence, Kansas, who toured around the Midwest. He also played professional baseball for a time, for the Ethiopian Clowns who became the Indianapolis Clowns, and worked as an extra in Hollywood. In 1942 he joined the Southern Gospel Singers, and in 1945 began singing as first tenor in, and managing, another gospel group, the Pilgrim Travelers.

The group began recording for Specialty Records in Los Angeles in 1947, and established a national reputation for their innovative and rhythmic musical style. Alexander also carried out A&R functions for Specialty, identifying new recording acts. In 1949 he heard the teenage Sam Cooke sing with the Highway Q.C.'s, and the following year, after Cooke had joined the Soul Stirrers, he signed the group to a recording contract. Alexander also brought several other gospel groups to the label, but devoted much of his attention to the Soul Stirrers, increasingly seeing Cooke as someone who could become a commercially successful teen idol by performing secular rather than spiritual music. The Soul Stirrers, with Cooke, and the Pilgrim Travelers, with Alexander, toured extensively together in the early and mid 1950s.

With Alexander's encouragement and guidance, Cooke began recording as a solo singer in 1957. He achieved great commercial success both before and after leaving Specialty and joining first Keen and then, in 1960, RCA. Alexander established the Kags Music firm in 1958, and in 1960 he and Cooke joined together as business partners to establish SAR Productions, with the aim of recording and marketing both gospel and rhythm and blues recordings. They later established the Derby label to record pop music, and also collaborated as songwriters on songs such as "Stand By Me Father", "That's Where It's At", and "Together Let's Find Love".

After Cooke's death in 1964, Alexander managed and promoted the career of another former gospel singer, Lou Rawls, who had also been a member of the Pilgrim Travelers; Rawls started having a series of pop and R&B hits in 1966. Alexander also recorded several future stars on his Derby label, notably Johnnie Taylor, Billy Preston and The Valentinos. He also worked as an independent record producer, with musicians including Bobby Bland, Little Junior Parker, Bobby Womack, Solomon Burke, and Little Richard.

Alexander died of prostate cancer in Hollywood, California, in 1996 at the age of 80.
