= Only Sixteen =

1959 single by Sam Cooke

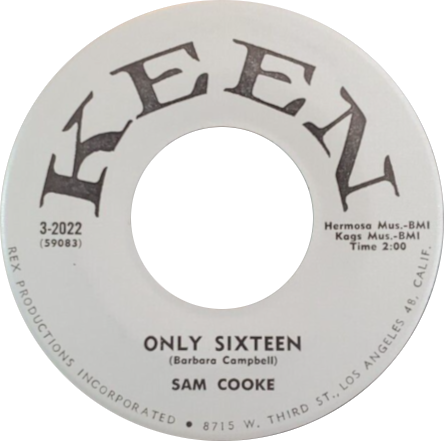
- Side-A label variant of the original US single

Single by Sam Cooke
- B-side: "Let's Go Steady Again"
- Released: May 1959
- Recorded: January 4, 1959
- Studio: Rex Productions, Los Angeles, California
- Genre: Rhythm and blues, soul, pop
- Length: 2:00
- Label: Keen 2022
- Songwriter: Sam Cooke
- Producer: Bumps Blackwell

Sam Cooke singles chronology
| "Everybody Loves to Cha Cha Cha" (1959) | "Only Sixteen" (1959) | "Summertime" (1959) |

"Only Sixteen" is a song by American singer-songwriter Sam Cooke, released in May 1959. It was a top 15 hit on Billboard's Hot R&B Sides chart and also charted within the top 30 of the Billboard Hot 100 and the UK Singles Chart. In the UK it was covered, and taken to No. 1, by Craig Douglas.

== Background ==
"Only Sixteen" was inspired by the sixteenth birthday of Lou Rawls's stepsister, Eunice. It was originally intended for actor Steve Rowland, who often hung around the Keen studio. Rowland asked Cooke to write a song for him, and Cooke borrowed the bridge from an earlier song of his, "Little Things You Do". Rowland's manager disliked the result, and Cooke re-recorded it for himself. The composition was originally credited to Barbara Campbell, a pseudonym used for Cooke, Lou Adler and Herb Alpert. Cooke married the real Barbara Campbell in October 1959. "Only Sixteen" was, in fact, solely written by Cooke.

== Personnel ==
Credits adapted from the liner notes to the 2003 compilation Portrait of a Legend: 1951–1964.

- Sam Cooke – vocals
- Clifton White – guitar
- René Hall – guitar
- Adolphus Asbrook – bass guitar
- Charles Blackwell – drums

== Chart performance ==
| Weekly charts (1959) | Peak position |
|---|---|
| UK | 23 |
| US Billboard Hot 100 | 28 |
| US Hot R&B Sides (Billboard) | 13 |

== The Supremes version ==
"Only Sixteen"
- Swedish single picture sleeve

Single by The Supremes

from the album We Remember Sam Cooke
- B-side: "Some Things You Never Get Used To"
- Released: May 21, 1968
- Recorded: 1965
- Genre: Rhythm and blues, soul, pop
- Length: 2:24
- Label: Tamla Motown
- Songwriter: Sam Cooke
- Producer: Harvey Fuqua · Hal Davis · Marc Gordon

The Supremes singles chronology
| "Forever Came Today" (1968) | "Only Sixteen" (1968) | "Love Child" (1968) |

The Supremes recorded a version, first released on their tribute album We Remember Sam Cooke (1965). In 1968, it was released as an A-side single in Scandinavia, as Diana Ross & the Supremes, where it reached No. 3 in Sweden. The B-side, "Some Things You Never Get Used To" was released elsewhere as an A-side, becoming a top 40 hit in the US, Canada, and the UK.

=== Charts ===
| Chart (1968) | Peak position |
|---|---|
| Sweden (Kvällstoppen) | 3 |

== Dr. Hook version ==
"Only Sixteen"
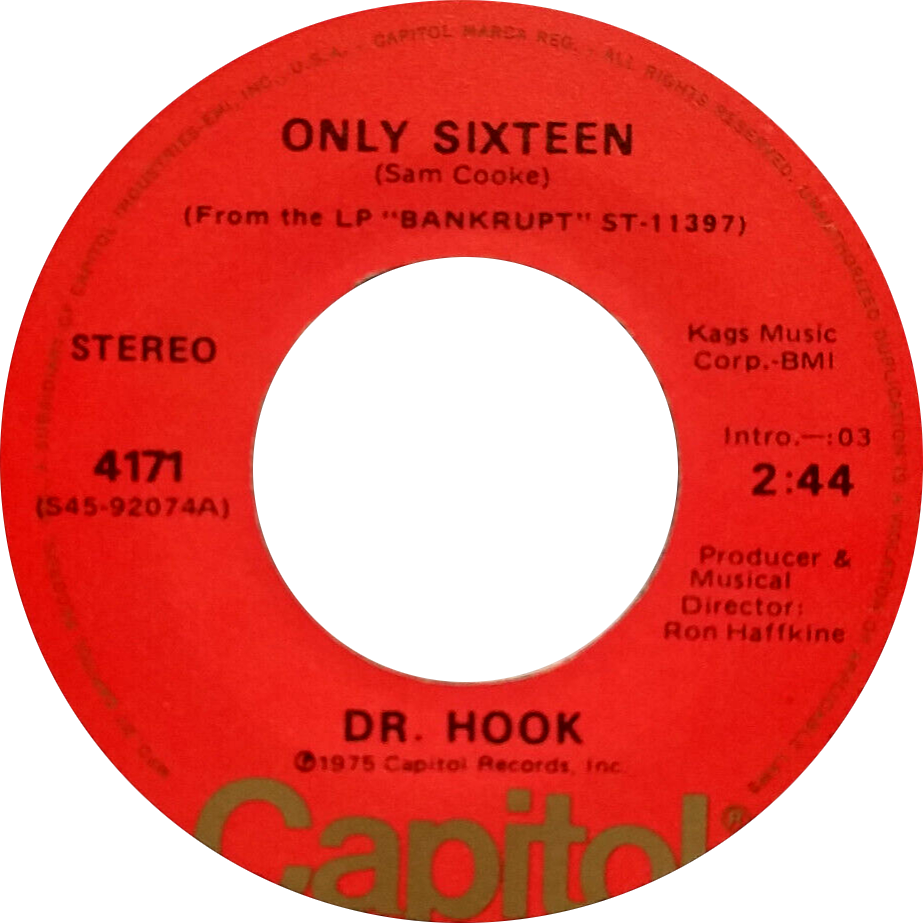
- Side A of the US single

Single by Dr. Hook

from the album Bankrupt
- B-side: "Let Me Be Your Lover"
- Released: December 1975
- Genre: Pop
- Length: 2:44
- Label: Capitol
- Songwriter: Sam Cooke
- Producer: Ron Haffkine

Dr. Hook singles chronology
| "The Millionaire" (1975) | "Only Sixteen" (1975) | "A Little Bit More" (1976) |

Dr. Hook released a version of "Only Sixteen" in the winter of 1975 and it was the most successful chart release of the song. It reached No. 6 on the US Billboard Hot 100 and No. 5 on Cash Box. Dr. Hook's version spent 22 weeks on the charts and became a Gold record.

=== Chart performance ===
==== Weekly charts ====
| Chart (1975–1976) | Peak position |
|---|---|
| Australia (Kent Music Report) | 3 |
| Canadian RPM Top Singles | 3 |
| Canadian RPM Adult Contemporary | 9 |
| US Billboard Hot 100 | 6 |
| US Billboard Adult Contemporary | 14 |
| US Cash Box Top 100 | 5 |

==== Year-end charts ====
| Chart (1976) | Rank |
|---|---|
| Australia (Kent Music Report) | 39 |
| Canada | 54 |
| US Billboard Hot 100 | 35 |

== Certifications ==
| Region | Certification | Certified units/sales |
|---|---|---|
| Australia (ARIA) | Gold | 50,000^{^} |
^{^} Shipments figures based on certification alone.

== Other cover versions ==
- Terry Black released a version in Canada in 1965 where it reached No. 14.

== See also ==
- List of UK Singles Chart number ones of the 1950s
