= Chain Gang (Sam Cooke song) =

1960 single by Sam Cooke

Single by Sam Cooke

from the album Swing Low
- B-side: "I Fall in Love Every Day"
- Released: July 26, 1960
- Recorded: January 25, 1960
- Studio: RCA Victor, New York City
- Genre: Soul; pop; R&B
- Length: 2:34
- Label: RCA Victor
- Songwriters: Sam Cooke, Charles Cook Jr.
- Producer: Hugo & Luigi

Sam Cooke singles chronology
"You Understand Me" (1960)	"Chain Gang" (1960)	"Sad Mood" (1960)

"Chain Gang" is a song by American singer-songwriter Sam Cooke, released as a single on July 26, 1960.

== Background ==
This was Cooke's second-biggest American hit, his first hit single for RCA Victor after leaving Keen Records earlier in 1959, and was also his first top 10 hit since "You Send Me" from 1957, and his second-biggest pop single. The song was inspired after a chance meeting with an actual chain gang of prisoners on a highway, seen while Cooke was on tour.

== Chart history ==
The song became one of Cooke's most successful singles, peaking at number two on the Billboard Hot 100 and the Hot R&B Sides chart. Overseas, "Chain Gang" charted at number nine on the UK Singles Chart, becoming Cooke's first top-ten single there.

Chart (1960)	Peak position
U.K. Singles Chart	9
U.S. Billboard Hot 100	2
U.S. Billboard Hot R&B Sides	2

== Jim Croce medley ==
"Chain Gang Medley: Chain Gang/He Don't Love You/Searchin"

Single by Jim Croce

from the album The Faces I've Been
- B-side: "Stone Walls"
- Released: December 1975
- Genre: Folk rock
- Length: 4:37
- Label: Lifesong
- Songwriters: Sam Cooke, Charles Cook, Jr., Jerry Butler, Curtis Mayfield, Calvin Carter, Jerry Leiber & Mike Stoller
- Producers: Terry Cashman, Tommy West

Jim Croce singles chronology
"Workin' at the Car Wash Blues" (1974)	"Chain Gang Medley: Chain Gang/He Don't Love You/Searchin" (1975)	"Mississippi Lady" (1976)

Jim Croce had his last Hot 100 hit in 1976 posthumously when Lifesong Records released "Chain Gang Medley", a medley which included this song as well as "He Don't Love You (Like I Love You)" and "Searchin' ". The medley reached a peak of No. 63 on the Billboard Hot 100 after spending 9 weeks on the chart.

Chart (1975–1976)	Peak position
U.S. Billboard Hot 100	63
U.S. Billboard Adult Contemporary	22
U.S. Cash Box Top 100	56
Canadian RPM Top Singles	29
Canadian RPM Adult Contemporary	20

== Other versions ==
In 1966, Otis Redding released a version of the song for his fourth studio album, The Soul Album.

In addition, American rhythm and blues/soul singer Jackie Wilson together with jazz pianist Count Basie released their version as a single in 1968, from the album Manufacturers of Soul. The song peaked at No. 84 on the Billboard Hot 100 and No. 37 on the Billboard R&B chart.

== In popular culture ==
A version of the song is chanted by the marching inmates, in the 1990 film Cadence.

The song is used in the opening sequence of the video-game based television series Fallout's third episode of the second season.
