= René Hall =

American guitarist and arranger (1912–1988)

Background information
- Born: René Joseph Hall; September 26, 1912; Morgan City, Louisiana, U.S.
- Died: February 11, 1988 (aged 75) Los Angeles, California, U.S.
- Genres: Soul, rock
- Occupations: Musician, composer, arranger
- Instrument: Guitar
- Formerly of: Billy Ward and his Dominoes; Sam Cooke; Bobby Womack

René Joseph Hall (September 26, 1912 – February 11, 1988) was an American guitarist and arranger. He was among the most important behind-the-scenes figures in early rock and roll, but his career spanned the period from the late 1920s to the late 1980s, and encompassed multiple musical styles.

== Biography ==
Born in Morgan City, Louisiana, René Hall first recorded in 1933 as a banjo player with Joseph Robichaux in New Orleans. He then worked around the country as a member of the Ernie Fields Orchestra, with whom he made his earliest recordings. In the group he was known by the nickname Lightnin' . Later he joined Earl Hines as musical arranger. During the 1940s he built up a considerable reputation as a session musician in New York City. In the late 1940s, he formed his own sextet which recorded for various labels including Jubilee, Decca, and RCA. He also worked as a talent scout for King Records, discovering such acts as Billy Ward and the Dominoes.

In the mid-1950s, Hall moved to Los Angeles, California, and began doing session work with saxophone player, Plas Johnson, and drummer, Earl Palmer. The trio recorded for many of the emerging rock and roll and R&B artists on such labels as Aladdin, Rendezvous, and Specialty Records. In 1958, he pioneered the usage of a Danelectro 6-string bass guitar as a supplement to standup bass on recording sessions with Ritchie Valens and others. This approach was widely imitated by arrangers all over the world.

Hall was a virtual one-man dynasty on the West Coast from the mid-1950s through the early 1970s, organizing such studio concoctions as B. Bumble & The Stingers hit "Nut Rocker", surf-rock group The Marketts ("Surfer's Stomp"), and The Routers of "Let's Go" fame. All featured Hall, Palmer and Johnson, but were then promoted by young white groups who performed the songs on tour. He gave his former employer Ernie Fields an unlikely rock hit with a version of the big band standard, "In The Mood", which reached #4 in Billboard during 1959. When Hall, Palmer, and Johnson did not want to issue it under their own names and tour behind it, they gave it to Fields, who then did join them in the studio for a follow-up hit.

Hall arranged Ike & Tina Turner's 1963 album Don't Play Me Cheap. He also arranged some of Sam Cooke's best-known recordings including the 1964 song, "A Change Is Gonna Come", in which Hall devised a dramatic arrangement with a symphonic overture for strings, kettledrum, and French horn. He prepared arrangements for many successful artists including The Impressions and Marvin Gaye. He also played guitar on Marvin Gaye's "Let's Get It On" and did a lot of work for Bobby Womack.

René Hall died of heart disease in Los Angeles, California at the age of 75.

== Discography ==
=== Singles ===
- 1952: René Hall – "Let's Turn The Lights Down Low" / "Must I" (RCA Victor 4881)
- 1953: René Hall Orchestra – "Don't Take Me For A Fool"/"Two Guitar Boogie" (RCA Victor 20-5407)
- 1957: René Hall's Orchestra Featuring Willie Joe / René Hall's Orchestra – "Twitchy" / "Flippin'" (Specialty 618)
- 1958: René Hall's Orchestra – "Saints Go Marchin' In" / "Thunderbird" (Specialty 629)
- 1958: René Hall's Orchestra – "Frankie And Johnny" / "Cleo" (Specialty 641)
- 1959: René Hall – "Smitty's Toy Piano" / "South Gate" (Arvee A 580)
- 1959: René Hall And His Guitars – "Moritat" / "Adalene" (Rendezvous No. 107)
- 1959: The Skunks And Rene Hall / Rene Hall – "Smitty's Xmas Toy Piano" / "Smitty's Toy Piano" (Arvee A 585)
- 1960: René Hall Orchestra – "La Cubalibra" / "The Untouchables" (Del-Fi 4135)
- René Hall Orchestra – "Night Fright" / "Turf" (Castil 101)

=== Work with other artists ===
Artist	Date	Song title	Peak chart position	Hall's role
The Dominoes	1951	Sixty Minute Man	#17, #1 R&B chart	Guitar, arranger
Don and Dewey	1957	Sweet Talk "Farmer John" (take 1); Just a Little Lovin'; The Letter		Leader, guitar
Larry Williams	1957	Short Fat Fannie	#5	Guitar
Larry Williams	1957	Bony Moronie	#14	Guitar
Sam Cooke	1957	You Send Me b-side, Summertime	#1 #81	Conductor, arranger
Larry Williams	1957, 1958	Iko Iko; Lawdy Miss Clawdy, Slow Down, Dizzy Miss Lizzy, Bad Boy		Guitar
Ritchie Valens	1958	La Bamba	#22	Danelectro, arranger
Ritchie Valens	1958	Donna	#2	Lead guitar & solo, arranger
Ritchie Valens	1958	Come On, Let's Go		Guitar, arranger
Chan Romero	1959	Hippy Hippy Shake		Danelectro bass guitar
Sam Cooke	1957	(I Love You) For Sentimental Reasons	#17	Arranger, guitar
Sam Cooke	1957	Desire Me	#47	Arranger, guitar
Sam Cooke	1957	You Were Made For Me	#39	Arranger, guitar
Sam Cooke	1958	"Win You Love For Me"	#22	Arranger, guitar
Sam Cooke	1959	Only Sixteen	#28	Arranger, guitar
Sam Cooke	1959	Everybody Loves to Cha Cha Cha	#31	Arranger, guitar
Sam Cooke	1959	God Bless The Child		Arranger, guitar
Sam Cooke	1959	Let's Call The Whole Thing Off		Arranger, guitar
Sam Cooke	1959	Ain't Nobody's Business If I Do		Arranger, guitar
Sam Cooke	1961	Cupid	#17	Arranger, guitar
Sam Cooke	1962	Twistin' the Night Away	#9	Arranger, guitar
Sam Cooke	1962	Bring It On Home To Me	#13	Arranger, guitar
Sam Cooke	1962	Having A Party	#17	Arranger, guitar
Sam Cooke	1962	"Nothing Can Change This Love"	#12	Arranger, guitar
The Valentinos	1962	Darling, Come Back Home; I'll Make It Alright; I've Got a Girl		"Session leader"
Sam Cooke	1963	Another Saturday Night	#10	Arranger, guitar
Sam Cooke	1963	Little Red Rooster	#11	Arranger, guitar
Sam Cooke	1964	Tennessee Waltz	#35	Arranger, guitar
Sam Cooke	1964	A Change Is Gonna Come		Arranger, guitar
Sam Cooke	1964	That's Where It's At	#93	Arranger, guitar
Sam Cooke	1964	Shake		Arranger, guitar
Marvin Gaye	1973	Let's Get It On	#1	Arranger and conductor
Marvin Gaye	1973	Please Stay (Once You Go Away)		Arranger and conductor
Marvin Gaye	1973	If I Should Die Tonight		Arranger and conductor
Marvin Gaye	1973	Keep Gettin' It On		Arranger and conductor

== Collaborations ==
- Rockin' With Robbin - Bobby Day (Class, 1959)
- Twistin' the Night Away - Sam Cooke (RCA Victor, 1962)
- Black and Blue - Lou Rawls (Capitol, 1963)
- Night Beat - Sam Cooke (RCA Victor, 1963)
- Tobacco Road - Lou Rawls (Capitol, 1964)
- All I Really Want to Do - Cher (Imperial, 1965)
- Venice Blue - Bobby Darin (Capitol, 1965)
- Together Again - Ray Charles (ABC, 1965)
- Crying Time - Ray Charles (ABC, 1966)
- Ray Charles Invites You to Listen - Ray Charles (ABC, 1967)
