= Sammy Lowe =

American jazz musician

Sammy Lowe (May 14, 1918, Birmingham, Alabama – February 17, 1993, Birmingham) was an American trumpeter, arranger, and conductor.

== Career ==
Lowe was active both in jazz and in R&B music, particularly in the 1950s and 1960s. From the 1930s to the late 1950s, he arranged music and played trumpet for the Erskine Hawkins Orchestra. He is present on many recordings of Erskine. He also recorded with alto saxophonist Bobby Smith and made arrangements for Dud Bascomb. From the late 1950s until his semi-retirement in 1990, he arranged music for Nina Simone (1967), Al Hirt, Benny Goodman, Connie Francis, Sam Cooke, The Softones, The Tokens, The Platters, Brook Benton, Sylvia, Ray, Goodman & Brown, Cameo, Little Peggy March, Della Reese, Panama Francis and Pat Thomas among others. He is perhaps best known for being one of James Brown's arrangers, including on the hits "It's a Man's Man's Man's World" and "Prisoner of Love".

Lowe was one of the first inductees to the Alabama Jazz Hall of Fame.

== Discography ==
=== As leader ===
- 1964: Hitsville, USA (RCA)

=== As sideman ===
With Willis Jackson

- Soul Grabber (Prestige, 1967)
