= Everybody Loves to Cha Cha Cha =

Single by Sam Cooke
- B-side: "Little Things You Do"
- Released: January 1959
- Recorded: January 7, 1959
- Studio: Radio Recorders (Hollywood, California)
- Genre: R&B, cha-cha-cha
- Length: 2:35
- Label: Keen
- Songwriter(s): Sam Cooke
- Producer(s): Bumps Blackwell

Sam Cooke singles chronology
"I Need You Now" (1959)	"Everybody Loves to Cha Cha Cha" (1959)	"Only Sixteen" (1959)

"Everybody Loves to Cha Cha Cha" (originally released as "Everybody Likes to Cha Cha Cha") is a song by American singer-songwriter Sam Cooke, released in January 1959. The song was one of Cooke's biggest successes on Billboard's Hot R&B Sides chart, peaking at number two; the song also charted at number 31 on the Billboard Hot 100.

The song references the cha-cha-cha, a dance of Cuban origin that became popular in the United States in the late 1950s.

== Background ==
The song originated from a Christmas 1958 party at Lou Rawls' stepfather's house. During the celebration, all began doing the cha-cha-cha, including Cooke's daughter, Linda. When one of the kids called out, "Everybody, cha-cha-cha!", Cooke grabbed a sheet of paper and wrote down the lyrics while everyone else danced. The song was recorded the week after New Year's 1959.

The song concerns Cooke and his girlfriend going to a dance in which all are doing the cha-cha-cha, a dance which his significant other doesn't know how to do. Cooke teaches his guest but by the end of the evening, she is "doing [the cha-cha-cha]" better than he is.

== Personnel ==
Credits adapted from the liner notes to the 2003 compilation Portrait of a Legend: 1951–1964.

- Sam Cooke – vocals
- Adolphus Asbrook – bass guitar
- Charles Blackwell – drums
- Jack Costanza – bongos
- Rene Hall – guitar
- Mike Pacheco – congas
- Clifton White – guitar
- Backing vocals are provided by Darlene Love and The Blossoms

== Charts and certifications ==
=== Weekly charts ===
Chart (1959)	Peak position
US Billboard Hot 100	31
US Hot R&B Sides (Billboard)	2
