= You Send Me =

1957 single by Sam Cooke

Single by Sam Cooke

from the album Sam Cooke
- B-side: "Summertime"
- Released: September 7, 1957
- Recorded: June 1, 1957
- Studio: Radio Recorders, Hollywood
- Genre: Rhythm and blues; soul
- Length: 2:41
- Label: Keen
- Songwriter: Sam Cooke (mistakenly credited to L.C. Cook)
- Producer: Bumps Blackwell

Sam Cooke singles chronology
"You Send Me" (1957)	"I'll Come Running Back to You" (1957)

"You Send Me" is a song written and originally recorded by American singer Sam Cooke, released as a single in 1957 by Keen Records. Produced by Bumps Blackwell and arranged and conducted by René Hall. The song, Cooke's debut single, was a massive commercial success, becoming a No. 1 hit on both Billboard's Rhythm & Blues Records chart and the Billboard Hot 100, his only number one on the latter chart.

It was named as one of the 500 most important rock and roll recordings by the Rock & Roll Hall of Fame. In April 2010, the song ranked No. 115 in Rolling Stone magazine's The 500 Greatest Songs of All Time.

In addition to the original version of Sam Cooke, "You Send Me" has received numerous covers over the years, the most important being the versions of Teresa Brewer (1957), Aretha Franklin (1968), Ponderosa Twins Plus One (1971) and The Manhattans (1985).

== Sam Cooke version (1957) ==
=== Background ===
Cooke wrote "You Send Me" but gave the writing credit to his younger brother L.C. (who used the original family spelling "Cook") because he did not want his own publisher to profit from the song. He had also hoped L.C. would record the song himself. Cooke made a demo recording of the song featuring only his own guitar accompaniment in the winter of 1955. The first recording of the track was made in New Orleans in December 1956 in the same sessions which produced "Lovable", the first release outside the gospel field for Cooke (credited on that single as Dale Cook). The classic version of "You Send Me" was cut in Los Angeles in June 1957 and was issued as a single with another track from the same session: a version of "Summertime", as the debut release on the Keen label founded by two brothers, John and Alex Siamas; this release marked the first single credited to "Sam Cooke" (whose true surname was Cook). Although "Summertime" was the intended A-side, disc jockeys favored "You Send Me", which broke nationally that October to reach No. 1 for a two-week stay in December 1957, with sales estimated at 1.5 million units. "Overnight, with a single song, Sam Cooke"—who had spent the summer of 1957 living in his producer's apartment—"became a secular superstar, with audiences consisting of black and white, men and women, young and old."

As was common practice in the 1950s when it was unusual for hits in the black R&B market to crossover to the Pop charts, a cover version of "You Send Me" aimed at the Pop charts was cut by the white singer Teresa Brewer and released in October 1957. Symptomatic of the changing music scene, Cooke's original was able to repeat its No. 1 R&B chart performance in the Pop field, eclipsing Brewer's version. Brewer's version of "You Send Me" reached as high as No. 8 on the Hot 100, her first and only top 10 hit since "Mutual Admiration Society" the year before, and her final Top 20 hit.

=== Acclaim ===
Since its release, the song has become a landmark record of the soul genre, which Cooke helped create. It was named as one of the 500 most important rock and roll recordings by the Rock & Roll Hall of Fame. In 2005, the song was voted No. 115 by representatives of the music industry and press in Rolling Stone magazine's The 500 Greatest Songs of All Time.

In 1998, the song was inducted into the Grammy Hall of Fame. In June 2026, CBS News included the song in its list of the 250 essential American songs of the past 250 years.

=== B-side ===
The B-side of Sam Cooke's original single "You Send Me" contains a cover version of the song "Summertime", which was also recorded by Cooke in 1957 for the album Songs by Sam Cooke. It was written between 1933 and 1934 by George Gershwin and DuBose Heyward (also co-credited to Ira Gershwin). The song was originally recorded in 1935 by Abbie Mitchell for the musical opera Porgy and Bess. Sam Cooke's version for "Summertime" was also released as a single and reached No. 81 on the US chart Billboard Hot 100.

=== Chart Positions ===
Year	Chart	Position
1957	Black Singles Chart	1
1957	Pop Singles Chart	1
1958	UK Singles Chart	29

=== Certifications ===
Region	Certification	Certified units/sales
New Zealand (RMNZ)	Gold	15,000^{‡}
United Kingdom (BPI)	Silver	200,000^{‡}
^{‡} Sales+streaming figures based on certification alone.

=== Personnel ===
On "You Send Me" and "Summertime":

- Sam Cooke – lead vocals
- René Hall – arrangement and rhythm guitar
- Clifton White, René Hall – guitar
- Ted Brinson – bass
- Earl Palmer – drums
- The Pied Pipers, Lee Gotch, Rickie Page – backing vocals
- Bob Kidder – engineer
- Robert Blackwell – producer

== The Manhattans version (1985) ==
"You Send Me"

Single by The Manhattans

from the album Too Hot to Stop It
- B-side: "You're Gonna Love Being Loved By Me"
- Released: February 1985
- Recorded: 1985 at Celestial Studios
- Genre: Soul; R&B
- Length: 4:10 (Album full version); 3:50 (Single edited version)
- Label: Columbia Records
- Songwriter: Sam Cooke
- Producers: Morrie Brown; Mighty M Productions Ltd.

The Manhattans singles chronology
"Forever by Your Side" (1983)	"You Send Me" (1985)	"Don't Say No" (1985)

Music video
- "You Send Me" by The Manhattans (Official Music Video) on YouTube

"You Send Me" was covered in 1985 by popular American R&B vocal group The Manhattans, whose version was recorded for the album Too Hot to Stop It, released the same year. This new version of the song was also released as a single and charted on the major music charts of the United States, Canada and New Zealand. The Manhattans version peaked No. 8 on the US Billboard Adult Contemporary chart and No. 11 on the US Cash Box Black Singles, as well as in the RPM Adult Contemporary chart in Canada.

=== Chart Positions ===
Chart (1985)	Peak position
Canada Adult Contemporary (RPM)	11
New Zealand (Recorded Music NZ)	48
US Adult Contemporary (Billboard)	8
US Jukebox Programmer R&B (Cash Box)	6
US Top 100 Black Singles (Cash Box)	11
US R&B Chart (Billboard)	20
US The Hot 100 (Billboard)	81

=== Personnel ===
- Lead vocal – Gerald Alston
- Backing vocals – Winfred "Blue" Lovett, Edward "Sonny" Bivins, Kenneth "Wally" Kelly
- Writer – Sam Cooke
- Producer – Morrie Brown
- Arranged By (Background Vocals) – Morrie Brown, Winfred Lovett
- Arranged By (Rhythm), Drum Programming – Lloyd Landesman, Morrie Brown
- Keyboards, Synthesizer – Lloyd Landesman
- Soloist, Saxophone – Chris Cioe
- Synthesizer (Strings) – Morrie Brown
- Recorded at Celestial Studios
- Produced for Mighty M Productions, Ltd.

=== B-side ===
The B-side of the 7" single contains the song "You're Gonna Love Being Loved By Me" which was also recorded by The Manhattans in 1985 for the album Too Hot to Stop It It was written by lead vocalist Gerald Alston, with Barbara Morr and Mark Chapman, and produced by the musicians John V. Anderson and Steve Williams, authors of "Crazy".

=== Track listing ===
==== 7" Single ====
Side	Song	Length	Interpreters	Writer/composer	Producers	Original album	Recording year
A-side	"You Send Me"	3:50	The Manhattans	Sam Cooke	Morrie Brown	Too Hot to Stop It	1985
B-side	"You're Gonna Love Being Loved By Me"	3:50	The Manhattans	Gerald Alston, Barbara Morr, Mark Chapman	John V. Anderson, Steve Williams	Too Hot to Stop It	1985

- The full length of "You Send Me" on the album Too Hot to Stop It is 4:10. The length of 3:50 on the single is an edited version of the song.

==== 12" Single ====
Side	Song	Length	Interpreters	Writer/composer	Producers	Original album	Recording year
A-side 1	"You Send Me"	3:50	The Manhattans	Sam Cooke	Morrie Brown	Too Hot to Stop It	1985
A-side 2	"You're Gonna Love Being Loved By Me"	3:50	The Manhattans	Gerald Alston, Barbara Morr, Mark Chapman	John V. Anderson, Steve Williams	Too Hot to Stop It	1985
B-side 1	"Kiss and Say Goodbye"	3:29	The Manhattans	Winfred Lovett	Bobby Martin, The Manhattans	The Manhattans	1976
B-side 2	"Hurt"	3:02	The Manhattans	Jimmie Crane, Al Jacobs	Bobby Martin, The Manhattans	The Manhattans	1976
B-side 3	"Shining Star"	3:48	The Manhattans	Leo Graham, Paul Richmond	Leo Graham	After Midnight	1980

== Other cover versions ==
=== Overview ===
"You Send Me" has been covered by a number of artists across different fields of music, including Jesse Belvin (1957), Nat King Cole, Teresa Brewer, Michael Bolton, The Drifters, The Everly Brothers, The Four Seasons, Bobby Vee (1960), José Feliciano, Aretha Franklin, Steven Houghton, Nicolette Larson, Steve Miller Band, Van Morrison, Otis Redding, Sam & Dave, Percy Sledge, Roy Ayers, Paul & Paula (1963), The Supremes, The Manhattans, Rachelle Ferrell, Fairground Attraction, Marcia Hines, Whitney Houston, Gregory Porter (2016), the Chicks, Ponderosa Twins Plus One, Lynda Carter from At Last (2009) and Judie Tzuke on The Beauty Of Hindsight (2003).

In the United Kingdom, Rod Stewart released "You Send Me" as part of a medley with "Bring It On Home to Me" and charted it on the UK Singles Chart at No. 7 as a double A-side with "Farewell". Stewart later recorded the song with Chaka Khan for his 2005 album Thanks for the Memory: The Great American Songbook, Volume IV.

==== Other chart performance ====
===== Teresa Brewer version =====
Year	Chart	Position
1957	Pop Singles	8

===== Aretha Franklin version =====
Year	Chart	Position
1968	R&B Singles	28
1968	Pop Singles Chart	56

===== Ponderosa Twins Plus One version =====
Year	Chart	Position
1971	Best Selling Soul Singles	23

== See also ==
- List of Billboard number-one rhythm and blues hits
- List of Billboard number-one singles of 1957
- Billboard year-end top 50 singles of 1957
- List of Cash Box Best Sellers number-one singles of 1957
- List of CHUM number-one singles of 1957

== Bibliography ==
- Portrait of a Legend 1951-1964. Abkco Records, 2003. Los Angeles, California.
- Wolff, Daniel J., S.R. Crain, Clifton White, and G. David Tenenbaum (1995). You Send Me: The Life and Times of Sam Cooke. William Morrow & Co. ISBN 0-688-12403-8.
