= (I Love You) For Sentimental Reasons =

"(I Love You) for Sentimental Reasons"

Song by Deek Watson & His Brown Dots
- Published: Print: 1945 by Duchess Music Corp.; Audio: 1945 by Manor Records
- Composer: William "Pat" Best
- Lyricist: Ivory "Deek" Watson

"(I Love You) for Sentimental Reasons" is a popular song written by Ivory "Deek" Watson, founding member of the Ink Spots and of the Brown Dots, and William "Pat" Best, founding member of the Four Tunes.

The credits and Duchess Music list Watson as a co-writer. Best later claimed that Watson had nothing to do with the creation of the song, but Watson maintained in his late-1960s autobiography that he and Best wrote the song together, lyrics and music respectively. Best was a member of Watson's group, the Brown Dots. The composition was published in print in 1945 by Duchess Music Corp. Also in 1945, the song was recorded and released by Watson's quartet with Joe King as lead vocalist on the Manor Records label (catalog No. 1041A).

== Hit versions ==
The biggest-selling version by The King Cole Trio was released by Capitol Records as catalog number 304. It first reached the Billboard Best Seller chart on November 22, 1946 and lasted 12 weeks on the chart, peaking at number one.

- The recording by Eddy Howard was released by Majestic Records as catalog number 1071A. It first reached the Billboard Best Seller chart on January 10, 1947, and lasted five weeks on the chart, peaking at number six.
- The recording by Dinah Shore was released by Columbia Records as catalog number 37188. It first reached the Billboard Best Seller chart on January 10, 1947, and lasted four weeks on the chart, peaking at number six.
- The recording by Charlie Spivak (vocal by Jimmy Saunders) was released by RCA Victor as catalog number 20-1981. It first reached the Billboard Best Seller chart on January 10, 1947, and lasted 14 weeks on the chart, peaking at number seven.
- Ella Fitzgerald & The Delta Rhythm Boys' version reached the No. 8 spot in the charts in 1947.
- Art Kassel and His "Kassels-in-the-air" (vocal by Jimmy Featherstone) – their recording was also a chart hit, peaking at No. 15 in 1947.
- Sam Cooke recorded an early soul version. Released in 1957, it peaked at 17 on the pop charts, and 15 on the R&B charts. (Sam Cooke discography)
- James Brown's disco version in 1976 charted at No. 70 R&B.

== Other recordings ==
- Nat King Cole – The Nat King Cole Story (1961)
- Vera Lynn – for her album Yours (1961)
- Dean Martin – for his album Cha Cha de Amor (1962)
- Marvin Gaye & Mary Wells on their album Together (1964)
- James Brown – Gettin' Down to It (1969)
- The Four Freshmen – The Complete Capitol Four Freshmen Fifties Sessions (2000)

== See also ==
- List of number-one singles of 1947 (U.S.)
