= Keen Records =

American independent record label (founded 1957; defunct)

- Keen record of Sam Cooke hit songs, c. 1960
- Founded: 1957
- Founder: John Siamas; Alex Siamas
- Status: Defunct
- Genre: Pop; R&B; soul
- Location: Los Angeles, California, U.S.

Keen Records was an American independent record label, founded by John and Alex Siamas in 1957 in Los Angeles. John Siamas was a successful businessman in the aerospace industry and, as a music aficionado, started Keen as a side business. They owned two other labels, Ensign and Andex, which shared a numbering system with Keen. Bob Keane (later of Del-Fi Records) was with the label in its early days, but departed in late 1957.

There was also a short-lived budget album label called Famous which reissued Keen material. Albumsby Famous were issued in the early 1960s, and it was likely owned by Keen, though this is not known for certain.

Robert "Bumps" Blackwell was the A&R man. It was a black pop label, featuring Sam Cooke and Johnny "Guitar" Watson. The critic Robert Christgau wrote that Keen was "one of the most resolutely black labels the record business has known."

== See also ==
- Sam Cooke
- Lists of record labels
