= Hugo & Luigi =

Luigi Creatore and Hugo Peretti, American songwriting and record producing team

Hugo & Luigi were an American record producing team, the duo of songwriters and producers Hugo Peretti and Luigi Creatore. They shared an office in New York's Brill Building, and besides their working relationship, were cousins.

== Background ==
First coming to attention with singles released on Mercury Records in the mid-1950s, they went on to produce Perry Como, Sam Cooke and several other RCA Victor artists, including the hit records "Twistin' the Night Away", "Another Saturday Night", "The Lion Sleeps Tonight" by the Tokens, "Shout", a classic by The Isley Brothers, and "I Will Follow Him" by Little Peggy March. They co-wrote Elvis Presley's hit "Can't Help Falling in Love", with George David Weiss. They also produced albums by Della Reese including The Classic Della, a collection of pop songs based on classical themes and Waltz With Me, Della, a collection of popular songs in 3/4 time. Their track, "La Plume de Ma Tante" (written by Al Hoffman and Dick Manning), reached number 29 in the UK Singles Chart in July 1959.

Hugo & Luigi were also onetime co-owners of Roulette Records. Songs composed by the duo were often credited to "Mark Markwell", and records they produced carried their distinct logo. While at Roulette Hugo and Luigi did a series of Beautiful Music recordings of "Cascading Voices" and later "Cascading Strings".

== Career ==
=== 1960s ===
It was announced in the 30 January 1960 issue of The Cash Box that Mike Collier had taken on the role of personal assistance in the Artists and Repertoire Department. Prior to that he was working for Hugo & Luigi overseeing the promotion men working in the field.

=== 1970s ===
After founding Avco Records and producing artists such as the Stylistics in the 1970s, Hugo & Luigi launched a new label, H&L Records, which they ran until they retired, at the end of the decade.

Peretti (born December 6, 1916) died on May 1, 1986. Creatore (born December 21, 1921) died on December 13, 2015.
