= Shake (Sam Cooke album) =

Studio album by Sam Cooke
- Released: January 1965
- Genre: Rhythm and blues, soul
- Length: 32:11
- Label: RCA Victor
- Producer: Hugo & Luigi, Al Schmitt

Sam Cooke chronology
Sam Cooke at the Copa (1964)	Shake (1965)	Try a Little Love (1965)

Shake is the first posthumous studio album by American singer-songwriter Sam Cooke.

Two years after its release, the melody and arrangement from "Yeah Man," one of the tracks from the album, was plagiarized by Arthur Conley and Otis Redding for their own song "Sweet Soul Music," which became a major hit for Conley. Cooke's estate eventually sued Conley and Redding and received songwriting credit and a settlement.

== Track listing ==
All tracks composed by Sam Cooke; except where indicated

=== Side one ===
1. "Shake" – 2:42
2. "Yeah Man" – 2:32
3. "Win Your Love for Me" (L.C. Cook) – 2:20
4. "Love You Most of All" (Barbara Campbell) – 2:19
5. "Meet Me at Mary's Place" – 2:40
6. "It's Got the Whole World Shakin'" – 2:42

=== Side two ===
1. "A Change Is Gonna Come" – 2:36
2. "I'm in the Mood for Love" (Jimmy McHugh, Dorothy Fields) – 3:23
3. "You're Nobody till Somebody Loves You" (James Cavanaugh, Larry Stock, Russ Morgan) – 2:56
4. "Comes Love" (Charles Tobias, Lew Brown, Sam H. Stept) – 2:28
5. "I'm Just a Country Boy" (Fred Brooks, Marshall Barer) – 2:40
6. "(Somebody) Ease My Troublin' Mind – 2:53

==== Notes ====
- Tracks 1, 2, 6, 8, 9 & 12 are previously unreleased.
- Track 3 was released as a single in 1958.
- Track 4 was the b-side to "Blue Moon" in 1958.
- Tracks 5 & 7 are from Ain't That Good News (1964).
- Track 10 is from Tribute to the Lady (1959).
- Track 11 is from Swing Low (1960).

== Charts ==
Chart (1965)	Peak position
US Top LPs	44
US Top R&B Albums	1

== See also ==
- List of Billboard number-one R&B albums of the 1960s
