= Kit Hawkins =

English entrepreneur

Kit Hawkins is an English entrepreneur and investor, based in Los Angeles.

Kit Hawkins is a prominent sports and entertainment investor through his investment company Present Ventures. He has invested in the new golf league TGL (golf league), co-founded by Tiger Woods and Rory McIlroy and in May 2025 it was announced that his group had successfully won the bid to buy the new TGL franchise, Motor City Golf Club, for the city of Detroit. His other investments include Unrivaled (basketball league), TOGETHXR, Good Good and the Snow League. Kit Hawkins co-founded Block with NBA Hall-Of-Fame player Steve Nash. Outside of sports, Kit is an owner of the luxury jewelry brand David_Webb_(jeweler) and sits on its Board of Directors.

He co-founded the music management company, Everybody's with Adam Tudhope. Clients include Keane, Laura Marling and Mumford & Sons. Along with Marcus Mumford and Carey Mulligan, he is one of the founders of the annual Warchild Winter Wassail. Kit Hawkins also represented David de Rothschild, developing the Plastiki project and producing the TV series Eco-Trip for NBC

Kit Hawkins is the co-founder of the creative agency Sunshine Sunshine represents leading fashion, luxury and lifestyle brands such as Dior, Adidas, Grey Goose and Balmain. Sunshine has offices in London, Los Angeles and Beijing.

At Sunshine he has produced Gucci's Chime for Change featuring Beyoncé, Off-Script featuring Jamie Foxx, Denzel Washington, Dwayne Johnson and Melissa McCarthy and the Emmy Nominated feature documentary My Beautiful Broken Brain

Kit Hawkins created the entertainment division of the advertising agency, Mother In 2012, he was one of the Executive Producers of Amnesty International's The Secret Policeman's Ball at Radio City, New York. The show featured many comedians, including Ben Stiller, Jon Stewart, Jason Sudeikis and Kristen Wiig. The musical artists were Coldplay and Mumford & Sons Along with Al Maccuish, Kit Hawkins developed and led Coca-Cola's 2012 Olympics Campaign.

Kit Hawkins founded the 3D production company Nineteen Fifteen Productions which produced the world's first live 3D television broadcast, filming Keane Live at Abbey Road for Sky. Other productions include Kylie Minogue Live in Toronto and Burberry's Fashion Show, which was broadcast live around the world. Kit Hawkins has also produced a number of music videos for artists including Madonna and Goldfrapp.

In 2005, the film Call Register, produced by Kit Hawkins, was nominated for a BAFTA.

On 6 September 2007 Kit Hawkins was honored by the United Nations for his role as the worldwide producer of Al Gore's Live Earth. Seven of the films commissioned and executive produced by Kit Hawkins opened the 2007 Tribeca Film Festival. They were introduced from the stage by Robert De Niro and Al Gore.

Kit Hawkins has worked with Richard Curtis on a number of projects including Make Poverty History and Live8. In 2005, they co-created the Click Film featuring George Clooney and Brad Pitt

Kit Hawkins is married to Jade Anderson, daughter of Yes singer Jon Anderson
