= Michael Pawlyn =

British architect

- Born: 30 September 1967 (age 58)
- Education: BSc (Hons) Architecture, BArch
- Alma mater: University College London; University of Bath
- Occupation: Architect
- Partner: Kelly Hill
- Children: 2
- Website: https://exploration-architecture.com

Michael Pawlyn (born 30 September 1967) is a British architect noted for his work in the field biomimetic architecture and innovation, as well as jointly initiating the 'Architects Declare' movement in the UK. He was part of the principal team of architects that conceived and designed The Eden Project and is a regular keynote speaker at events on innovation and environmental sustainability. His best selling RIBA book Biomimicry in Architecture was published in 2011 and a revised second edition, with a foreword by Ellen MacArthur, was published in 2016. He was one of the three founders of The Sahara Forest Project - a way of supplying fresh water, food and renewable energy in arid conditions - and remains actively involved as a Founding Partner and Design Manager.

== Career ==
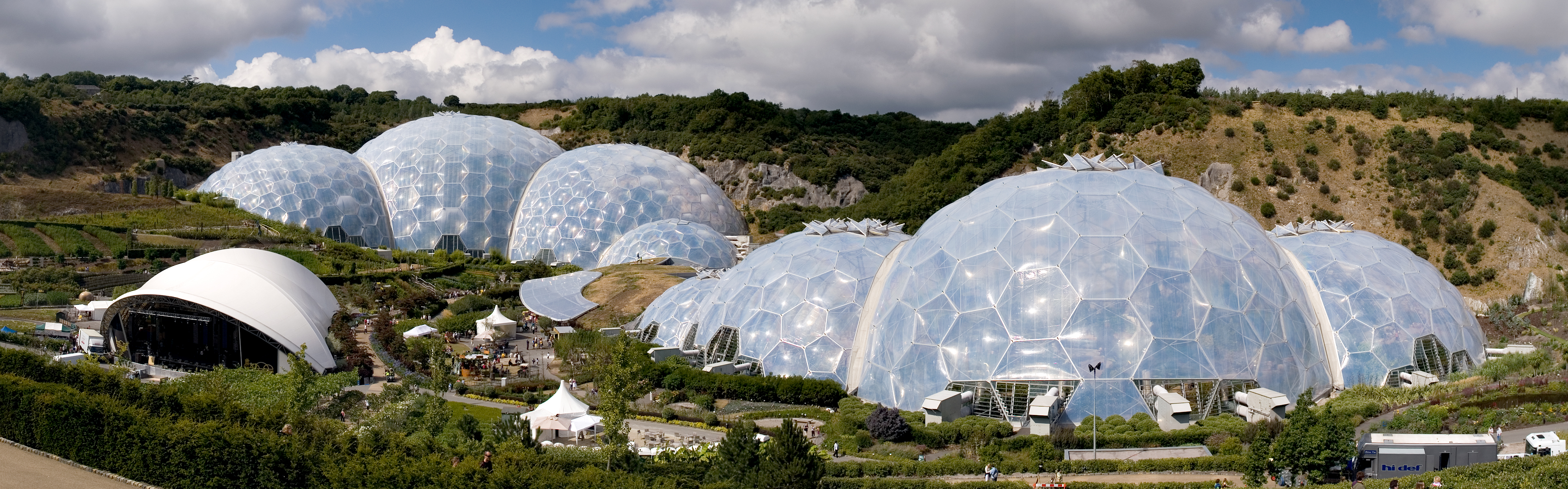
The Eden Project

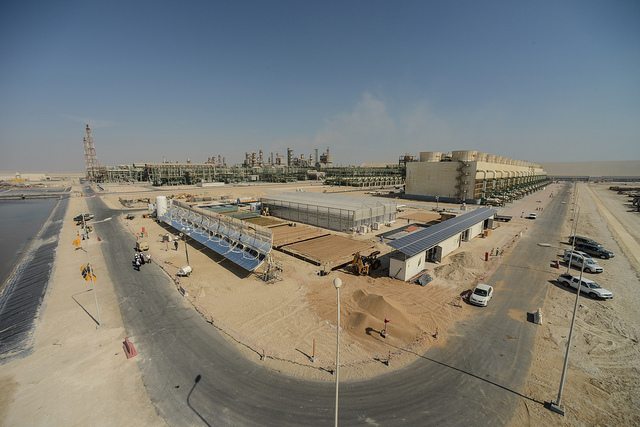
The Sahara Forest pilot facility in Qatar

After graduating in Architecture from The Bartlett, University College London, Pawlyn worked in London and Japan before returning to complete his studies at the University of Bath. He worked briefly as a researcher on television documentaries before joining Haworth Tompkins Architects. In 1997 Michael Pawlyn became part of the Grimshaw Architects' team to work on the Eden Project. This innovative scheme, conceived by Tim Smit, radically transformed a Kaolinite pit into a complex of adjoining Biomes that created sustainable environments for Rainforest and Mediterranean plant species.

In 2007 he established Exploration Architecture to develop work that employs biomimicry as a guiding principal and brings together three lifelong passions - biology, design and the environment.

At TED Salon London, November 2010, Michael Pawlyn became one of the small number of architects to have a talk posted to TED. His presentation, in which he describes how biomimicry could help transform architecture and society, has been viewed over 2.1 million times.

Exploration Architecture's work was exhibited in a solo exhibition, at The Architecture Foundation in 2014; featured in the Future Knowledge exhibition at Modern Art Oxford in 2018; and Learning From Nature: The Future of Design exhibition in Atlanta, Georgia in 2019.

In 2018 Michael Pawlyn was invited to join an International Panel of Experts advising the Singapore Government on future development plans, best practice and global trends in planning and urban design.

With the publication of the 2018 IPCC Report, which concluded that limiting global warming would require “rapid and far-reaching” transitions in land, energy, industry, buildings, transport, and cities," Pawlyn jointly initiated Architects Declare a Climate & Biodiversity Emergency. This movement has inspired over 6,000 companies in 26 countries to sign a declaration of action and a commitment to address "the needs of our society without breaching the earth’s ecological boundaries will demand a paradigm shift in our behaviour".

== Selected projects ==
Boat for the Plastiki Expedition: This project, designed with client David de Rothschild, explored Cradle to Cradle ideas to highlight solutions to plastic pollution in the ocean.

The Sahara Forest Project: demonstrates how biomimicry can help address a range of challenges by employing three components - saltwater cooled greenhouses, concentrated solar power (CSP) and desert revegetation technologies. Collectively these elements provide fresh water, land regeneration, the sequestering of carbon in soils, the closing the nutrient cycle and provides employment in deprived areas.

The Biomimetic Office: A sustainable office building designed with Yaniv Peer of Exploration, Arup Research & Development, Mace Cost Consultants and Professor Julian Vincent

The Mountain Data Centre: A concept for ultra-low energy data centre based on principles of efficient branching systems in biology referred to as Murray's law.

== Personal ==
Michael lives in London with his partner, photographer Kelly Hill, and their two children.

== Bibliography ==
Books:

· Michael Pawlyn (2011) Biomimicry in Architecture (first edition) with a foreword by Jonathon Porritt, London, RIBA Publications

· Michael Pawlyn (2016) Biomimicry in Architecture (second edition) with a foreword by Dame Ellen MacArthur, London, RIBA Publications

· Sarah Ichioka and Michael Pawlyn (2022) Flourish: Design Paradigms for Our Planetary Emergency, Triarchy Press Ltd

Chapter in multi-authored book:

· Michael Pawlyn (2016) Ecosystems as a unifying model for cities and industry, The Ellen MacArthur Foundation (ed.) A New Dynamic 2: Effective systems in a circular economy, Cowes, Ellen MacArthur Foundation Publishing, pp 63–85
