= Exploration Architecture =

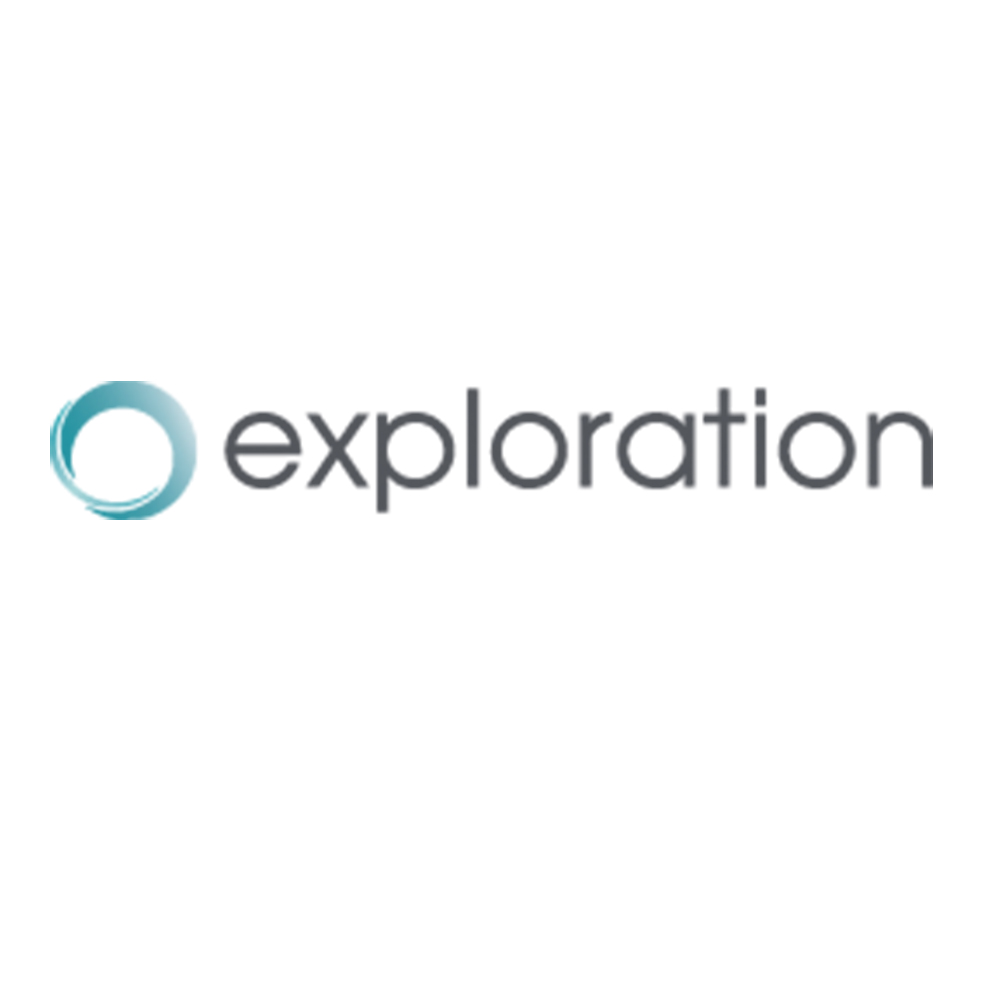
- Known for: Exploration Architecture has been described as a pioneer in biomimicry. Best known for high performance, sustainable buildings and progressive consultancy work
- Notable work: The Sahara Forest Project; The Biomimetic Office Building Designing with Nature Michael Pawlyn (2011) Biomimicry in Architecture (first edition) with a foreword by Jonathon Porritt, London, RIBA Publications Michael Pawlyn (2016) Biomimicry in Architecture (second edition) with a foreword by Dame Ellen MacArthur, London, RIBA Publications
- Website: exploration-architecture.com

Exploration Architecture was established in 2007 by architect Michael Pawlyn (b. 1967).

Based in London the studio develops projects with clients using biomimicry as a guiding principle to conceive of high performance, sustainable buildings.

== Designing with nature ==
The Architecture Foundation featured the work of the practice in a solo exhibition, Designing with Nature in Central London in 2014.

Exploration presented four projects - The Biomimetic Office, The Mountain Data Centre, The Sahara Forest Project and The BioRock Pavilion - along with a collection of biological specimens that are used by the architects as a source of inspiration for innovative buildings.

The projects were displayed on 3D printed tables, designed using SKO software – a computer programme based on the adaptive growth patterns of trees and bones.

The company commissioned four films by photographer, Kelly Hill, that explored the design philosophy behind each of the schemes and provided further insight into the process of applying biomimicry to architecture.

== Selected projects ==
Boat for the Plastiki Expedition: This project, designed with client David de Rothschild, explored Cradle-to-cradle design ideas to highlight solutions to plastic pollution in the ocean.

The Sahara Forest Project: demonstrates how biomimicry can help address a range of challenges by employing three components - saltwater cooled greenhouses, concentrated solar power (CSP) and desert revegetation technologies. Collectively these elements provide fresh water, land regeneration, the sequestering of carbon in soils, the closing the nutrient cycle and provides employment in deprived areas.

The Biomimetic Office: A sustainable office building designed with Yaniv Peer of Exploration, Arup Research & Development, Atelier Ten, Expedition Engineering, Mace Cost Consultants and Julian Vincent

The Mountain Data Centre: A concept for ultra-low energy data centre based on principles of efficient branching systems in biology referred to as Murray’s Law
