= Wallace Seawell =

American photographer

Wallace Seawell (September 16, 1916 – May 29, 2007) was an American photographer best known for his portraits of Hollywood stars such as Bette Davis, Audrey Hepburn and George Burns.

Seawell was born in Atlanta, Georgia, in 1916 and studied photography at the Rochester Institute of Technology, graduating with honours in 1940. He served with the Army Signal Corps in Los Angeles making nearly fifty training films.

He joined the leading West Coast photographer Paul Hesse and started taking photos for movie studios and fan magazines. Seawell also took photos of other public figures such as President Lyndon B. Johnson and the Duke and Duchess of Windsor, as well as photos for album covers for well-known singers such as Johnny Mathis and Peggy Lee. He also took the memorable photo of Sam Cooke for his final studio album, Ain't That Good News, in 1964.

Seawell was the technical advisor for Bob Cummings' television program, Love That Bob, in which Cummings played "Bob Collins", a Hollywood photographer.

Seawell's photographs at MPTV Images.
