= A Change Is Gonna Come =

1964 single by Sam Cooke

Single by Sam Cooke

from the album Ain't That Good News
- A-side: "Shake"
- Released: December 22, 1964
- Recorded: January 30, 1964
- Studio: RCA (Hollywood, California)
- Genre: Soul; R&B
- Length: 3:11 (album); 2:36 (single edit)
- Label: RCA Victor
- Songwriter: Sam Cooke
- Producer: Hugo & Luigi

Sam Cooke singles chronology
"Cousin of Mine" (1964)	"A Change Is Gonna Come" (1964)	"It's Got The Whole World Shakin'" (1965)

"A Change Is Gonna Come" is a song by the American singer-songwriter Sam Cooke. It initially appeared on Cooke's album Ain't That Good News, released mid-February 1964 by RCA Victor; a slightly edited version of the recording was released as a single on December 22, 1964. Produced by Hugo & Luigi and arranged and conducted by René Hall, the song was the B-side to "Shake".

The song was inspired by various events in Cooke's life, most prominently when he and his entourage were turned away from a whites-only motel in Louisiana. Cooke felt compelled to write a song that spoke to his struggle and of those around him, and that pertained to the Civil Rights Movement and African Americans.

Though only a modest hit for Cooke in comparison with his previous singles, "A Change Is Gonna Come" is widely considered one of Cooke's greatest and most influential compositions and has been voted among the greatest songs ever recorded by various publications. In 2007, the song was selected for preservation in the Library of Congress by the National Recording Registry, having been deemed "culturally, historically, or aesthetically significant." In 2021, Rolling Stone magazine placed it at number 3 on its list of the "500 Greatest Songs of All Time", and in 2025, the magazine placed it at number 1 on its list of "The 100 Best Protest Songs of All Time."

== Background ==
Sam Cooke tried booking at the Holiday Inn in Shreveport, Louisiana before being turned away due to racism.

On October 8, 1963, en route to Shreveport, Louisiana, Cooke called ahead to the Holiday Inn North to make reservations for his wife, Barbara, and himself, but when he and his group arrived, the desk clerk glanced nervously and explained there were no vacancies. While his brother Charles protested, Sam was furious, yelling to see the manager and refusing to leave until he received an answer. His wife nudged him, attempting to calm him down, telling him, "They'll kill you," to which he responded, "They ain't gonna kill me, because I'm Sam Cooke." When they eventually persuaded Cooke to leave, the group drove away calling out insults and blaring their horns. When they arrived at the Castle Motel on Sprague Street downtown, the police were waiting for them, arresting them for disturbing the peace. The New York Times ran a UPI report the next day, headlined "Negro Band Leader Held in Shreveport," but African-Americans were outraged. In 2019, then-Shreveport mayor Adrian Perkins apologized to Cooke's family for the event, and posthumously awarded Cooke the key to the city.

In addition, upon hearing the Bob Dylan song "Blowin' in the Wind" in 1963, Cooke was greatly moved that such a poignant song about racism in America could come from someone who was not black and also ashamed he had not yet written something like that himself. However, his image and fears of losing his large white fan base had prevented him from doing so. Cooke loved Dylan's song so much it was immediately incorporated into his repertoire. He was further influenced by the message of the dream in Martin Luther King Jr.'s "I Have a Dream" speech at the civil rights march on Washington that year. Toward the end of 1963, according to Cooke, the "Change" composition came to him in a dream.

Research by Ian Mance shows that Cooke was in Durham, North Carolina, during sit-ins by North Carolina College at Durham students and others and that Cooke wrote his first draft on a Durham bus.

Photographic documentation and a personal conversation with Sam Cooke by Cecil J. Williams, a former Jet magazine photographer, revealed that although Cooke's inspiration to write the lyrics to "A Change Is Gonna Come' may have resulted from multiple incidents, his earliest reference was to an incident at the Columbia Township Auditorium in February 1961— a time two years earlier than other references. Williams, a native of Orangeburg, South Carolina, was backstage with Cooke before his performance, and being an avid fan of Cooke's, he asked what his next song would be. Cooke replied, "With s**t like this happening, things have got to change. I think I'm going to sing something about, "a long time coming, but change is gonna come...Change gotta come." Cooke was referring to a heated discussion with the venue management and a plainclothes law enforcement officer about having to perform with black and white spectators being forced to comply with segregated facilities. Flyers advertising the show indicated white people would be accommodated in special seating—upstairs. In addition to recalling this conversation, Williams' images of his wife with Cook and closeup images of his performing add much credibility to his assertion.

== Recording and production ==
Following Christmas 1963, Cooke invited J. W. Alexander to his home to preview a new song he had just written, one Cooke was excited about. When he arrived, Cooke ran through the number on his guitar twice, the second time going over it line by line. Both were excited to record the song, with Alexander viewing it as more personal and political than anything he had yet attempted. He warned Cooke that he might not profit off the song as he had with lighter, poppier songs, but Cooke did not care. He explained to Alexander that he hoped the song would make his father proud. "It was less work than any song he'd ever written," biographer Peter Guralnick says. "It almost scared him that the song—it was almost as if the song were intended for somebody else. He grabbed it out of the air and it came to him whole, despite the fact that in many ways it's probably the most complex song that he wrote. It was both singular—in the sense that you started out, 'I was born by the river'—but it also told the story both of a generation and of a people."

Cooke handed the song to his arranger René Hall, with no specific instructions as to what he personally wanted, but to give it "the kind of instrumentation and orchestration that it demanded." Previously, the duo had collaborated on arrangements, but this was the first occasion in which Hall was granted complete control of the eventual arrangement, and he composed it as he would a movie score, with lush, symphonic strings. "I wanted it to be the greatest thing in my [life]—I spent a lot of time, put out a lot of ideas, and then changed them and rearranged them," said Hall. Cooke was well known as a perfectionist and "control freak" in the recording studio, so giving Hall total latitude was unprecedented.

AFO drummer John Boudreaux was intimidated by the orchestral arrangement and refused to leave the control room; session player and close collaborator Earl Palmer was working next door and filled in for the song. Luigi Creatore asked Cooke to provide one more take, and the eighth take was "nearly perfect." Creatore was pleased with the song, considering it among his best, both serious and still uniquely his own. Cooke had initially imagined that Creatore, first and foremost a pop hitmaker, would not respect the socially conscious song.

== Composition ==
"A Change Is Gonna Come"
A sound sample of "A Change Is Gonna Come," emphasizing the song's lush, orchestral accompaniment.

Each verse is a different movement, with the strings carrying the first, the horns the second, and the timpani carrying the bridge. The French horn present in the recording was intended to convey a sense of melancholy.

Cooke also incorporated his personal experiences into the song, such as encounters in Memphis, Shreveport, and Birmingham, to reflect the lives and struggles of all African-Americans of the time. The lines "I don't know what's up there / Beyond the sky" could refer to Cooke's doubt for absolute true justice on earth. The final verse, in which Cooke pleads for his "brother" to help him, is a metaphor for what Alexander described as "the establishment". The verse continues, 'But he winds up knocking me / back down on my knees.'"

== Release ==
Cooke first performed "A Change Is Gonna Come" on The Tonight Show Starring Johnny Carson on February 7, 1964. Cooke's new manager, Allen Klein, was infatuated with the song and persuaded Cooke to do away with promoting his most recent single, "Ain't That Good News", and perform "Change" instead, feeling that that was the statement he needed to make before a national audience. Cooke objected, noting that the album's release was a month away and that he had no time to pull together an arrangement within such a short time frame. Klein arranged for RCA to pay for a full string section and Cooke performed the song that Friday on The Tonight Show after performing "Basin Street". An NBC timekeeper logged down the number as "It's a Long Time Coming," but the network did not save the tape of the performance. Klein and Alexander both felt it would become a milestone moment in Cooke's career, but it was overshadowed by the Beatles' performance on The Ed Sullivan Show on CBS just two days later.

The song was issued on March 1 as a track on Cooke's album Ain't That Good News. It would not be issued as a single for another nine months.

Cooke elected not to perform "A Change Is Gonna Come" again in his lifetime, both because of the complexity of the arrangement and because of the ominous nature of the song. When shown to his protégé Bobby Womack, he responded that it sounds "like death." Cooke responded in return, "Man, that's kind of how it sounds like to me. That's why I'm never going to play it in public." Womack clarified his thoughts, that it wasn't deathly, but rather "spooky," but Cooke never performed the song again.

In December, "A Change Is Gonna Come" was prepared for single release, with the verse and chorus preceding the bridge ("I go to the movies...") deleted for radio airplay. The civil rights movement picked up on "A Change Is Gonna Come" with near immediacy. On December 11, 1964, two weeks before the song was released, Sam Cooke was fatally shot at a Los Angeles motel. Cash Box described the single as "a moving, string-filled ‘message’ tune."

== Legacy ==
"A Change Is Gonna Come" became an anthem for the Civil Rights Movement, and is widely considered one of Cooke's greatest compositions. Over the years, the song has garnered significant praise. In 2004, it was voted number 12 by representatives of the music industry and press in Rolling Stone magazine's 500 Greatest Songs of All Time. It was then voted number 3 in Rolling Stone's 2021 edition of the list, and in 2025, the magazine placed it at number 1 on its list of "The 100 Best Protest Songs of All Time." The song was ranked number 3 in Pitchfork Media's The 200 Greatest Songs of the 60s. It is also among 300 songs deemed the most important ever recorded by National Public Radio (NPR). NPR called the song "one of the most important songs of the civil rights era."

In 2007, the song was selected for preservation in the Library of Congress, with the National Recording Registry deeming the song "culturally, historically, or aesthetically important." In June 2026, CBS News included the song in its list of the 250 essential American songs of the past 250 years.

The words "A change is gonna come" are on a wall of the Contemplative Court, a space for reflection in the Smithsonian's National Museum of African American History and Culture; the museum opened in 2016.

=== In other media ===
Otis Redding covered the song for his 1965 album Otis Blue, saying he wanted to "fill the silent void" created by Cooke's death. His version, retitled "Change Gonna Come," is a more restrained arrangement without any orchestration. Aretha Franklin’s 1967 cover featured on her first top ten album, I Never Loved a Man the Way I Love You. The 5th Dimension released a medley of the song with the United States Declaration of Independence and "People Got to Be Free" as a single from their 1970 album Portrait. Baby Huey covered it in a posthumous album released in 1971.

"A Change Is Gonna Come" was featured in the 1992 Spike Lee-directed movie, Malcolm X, in the scene in which Malcolm X (played by Denzel Washington) is driving to the ballroom where he is about to be assassinated.

The song has served as a sample for rappers Ghostface Killah (1996), Ja Rule (2003), Papoose (2006), Lil Wayne (2007) "Long Time Coming (Remix)" Charles Hamilton, Asher Roth, B.o.B (2009), and Bizzle (2011); Nas's It Was Written album also features a similar opening to the song. On their album The Reunion hip-hop artists Capone-N-Noreaga used an excerpt from the song on the opening track which shares the same title as the Cooke original.

After winning the 2008 United States presidential election, Barack Obama referred to the song, stating to his supporters in Chicago, "It's been a long time coming, but tonight, change has come to America." A duet of the song by Bettye LaVette and Jon Bon Jovi was included in We Are One: The Obama Inaugural Celebration at the Lincoln Memorial.

In 2004, Patti LaBelle performed the song at the annual Nobel Peace Prize Concert to a standing ovation.

In the seventh episode of the sixth season of The West Wing, titled "A Change Is Gonna Come", James Taylor performs the song for President Jed Bartlet and other guests at a reception.

In 2008, Wayne Brady performed the song on his debut studio album A Long Time Coming and British singer Seal covered it for his album Soul. In 2010, Shinyribs performed the song on their album Well After Awhile.

On June 1, 2013, Beyoncé Knowles sang the song during The Sound of Change Live concert in London, as part of Chime for Change, a campaign that supports gender equality. Mark Sutherland of Rolling Stone magazine noted that Knowles belted out the song, while Alice Vincent from The Daily Telegraph noted that the rendition of the song reflected the event's purpose. Later, on July 20, 2013, Knowles performed the song during a stop in Detroit as part of her Mrs. Carter Show World Tour. The performance followed the city's recent file for bankruptcy. As Knowles performed, the screen behind her displayed photos of Detroit's landmarks and icons including Aretha Franklin, Aaliyah, Eminem, Anita Baker, Bob Seger, Kid Rock, the White Stripes, Berry Gordy Jr., and Joe Louis. The montage ended with the declaration "Nothing Stops Detroit!" and Knowles closed the performance by saying "I love you, Detroit". A spokesperson for the singer described the performance as a "unique tribute to the history of an incredible city and a celebration of the strong spirit of its people". A black-and-white video of the cover was uploaded on Knowles' official YouTube channel on July 30, 2013. It closes with a quote from Henry Ford: "Failure is simply the opportunity to start over, this time more intelligently." A reporter for The Huffington Post reported that the singer's "heartfelt" cover of the song "touched" her fans and the people who loved Detroit. Latifah Muhammad of Black Entertainment Television wrote that Knowles' "powerful" rendition of the song came right on time. An editor for Essence described Knowles' cover as a "moving tribute to Detroit". Jordan Sargent of Spin wrote, "It all might come off as a bit heavy-handed if it wasn't for the fact that, well, Beyonce absolutely slays the cover." Lauren Moraski from CBS News described the tribute to the city as "touching".

In 2017, Greta Van Fleet released a cover of the song on their double EP From the Fires, and Kimie released her cover on her album Proud as the Sun.

In 2019, Céline Dion performed the song as a part of a tribute to Aretha Franklin called "Aretha! A Grammy Celebration For The Queen of Soul". The tribute was broadcast by CBS in March 2019.

In June 2020, a version of the song was recorded by Laurie Wright and Chris Faice with 100% of proceeds going to the Minnesota Freedom Fund.

Jennifer Hudson performed the song on the third night of the 2020 Democratic National Convention.

In the 2020 film One Night in Miami..., Leslie Odom Jr., portraying Cooke, sings the song in the movie's reenactment of Cooke's appearance on The Tonight Show in 1964.

== Personnel ==
"A Change Is Gonna Come" was recorded on January 30, 1964, at RCA Studios in Hollywood, California. The engineer present was Wally Heider, and the session was conducted and arranged by René Hall. The musicians also recorded "Falling in Love" the same day. Credits adapted from the liner notes to the 2003 compilation Portrait of a Legend: 1951–1964.

- Sam Cooke – lead vocals
- SR Crain – backing vocals
- Paul Foster – backing vocals
- Jimmie Outler – backing vocals
- Richard Gibbs – backing vocals
- JJ Farley – backing vocals
- René Hall – guitar
- Norman Bartold – guitar
- Arnold Belnick – guitar
- Clifton White – guitar
- Chuck Badie – bass guitar
- Earl Palmer – drums
- Harold Battiste – piano
- William Hinshaw – French horn
- Emil Radocchia – marimba, timpani, percussion
- William Kurasch – trumpet
- Louis Blackburn – trombone
- John Ewing – trombone
- David Wells – trombone
- Harry Hyams – viola
- Alexander Neiman – viola
- Israel Baker – violin
- Irving Lipschultz – violin
- Leonard Malarsky – violin
- Jack Pepper – violin
- Ralph Schaeffer – violin
- Sidney Sharp – violin
- Darrel Terwilliger – violin
- Tibor Zelig – violin
- Emmet Sargeant – cello

== Charts (Sam Cooke version) ==
Chart (1965)	Peak position
US Billboard Hot 100	31
US Billboard R&B Singles Chart	9
US Cash Box Top 100	46

== Certifications (Sam Cooke version) ==
Region	Certification	Certified units/sales
New Zealand (RMNZ)	Platinum	30,000^{‡}
United Kingdom (BPI)	Gold	400,000^{‡}
^{‡} Sales+streaming figures based on certification alone.

== See also ==
- Civil rights movement in popular culture

== Bibliography ==
- Portrait of a Legend 1951-1964. Abkco Records, 2003. Los Angeles, California.
- Werner, Craig (1999). A Change Is Gonna Come: Music, Race, and the Soul of America. Plume. ISBN 0-452-28065-6.
- Wolff, Daniel J.; S.R. Crain; Clifton White & G. David Tenenbaum (1995). You Send Me: The Life and Times of Sam Cooke. William Morrow & Co. ISBN 0-688-12403-8.
- Guralnick, Peter (2005). Dream Boogie: The Triumph of Sam Cooke. Back Bay Books. ISBN 978-0316013291.
