= Plastiki =

Boat made of plastic

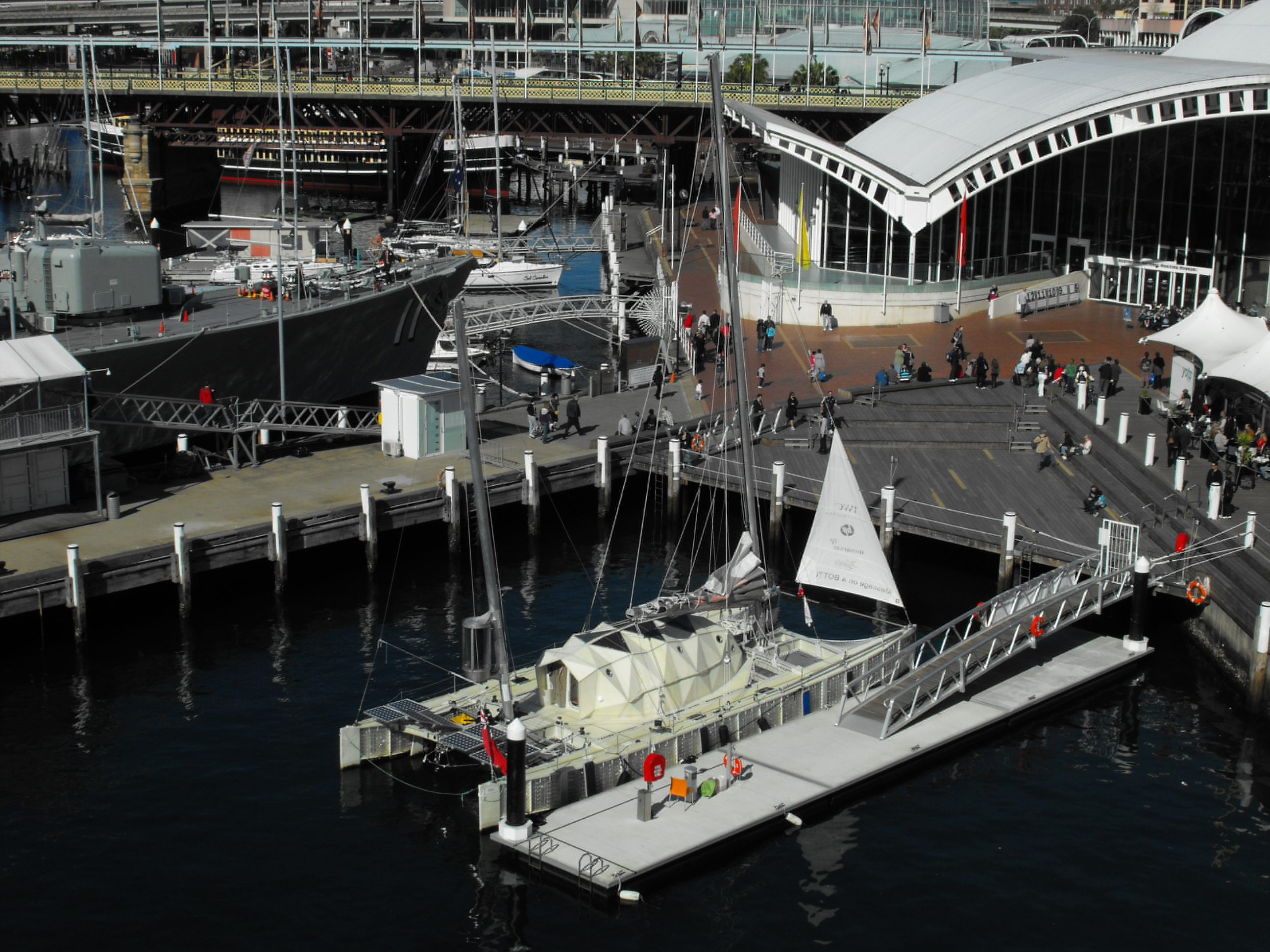
- Plastiki on display at the Australian National Maritime Museum following her Pacific crossing

History
- Name: Plastiki
- Owner: David de Rothschild
- Builder: Andy Fox, San Francisco

General characteristics
- Type: Catamaran
- Tons burthen: 12 tons
- Length: 60 ft (18 m) overall
- Beam: 23 ft (7.0 m)
- Notes: 12,500 PET bottles used as flotation

The Plastiki is a 60-foot (18 m) catamaran made out of 12,500 reclaimed plastic bottles and other recycled PET plastic and waste products. Michael Pawlyn of Exploration Architecture worked on the concept design with David de Rothschild and helped to shape some of the key ideas. The craft was built using cradle to cradle design philosophies and features many renewable energy systems, including solar panels, wind and trailing propeller turbines, and bicycle generators. The frame was designed by Australian naval architect Andrew Dovell. The boat's name is a play on the 1947 Kon-Tiki raft used to sail across the Pacific by Norwegian explorer Thor Heyerdahl, and its voyage roughly followed the same route.

On March 20, 2010, the sailing vessel set off from San Francisco, California to cross the Pacific Ocean with a crew of six. The expedition projected landfall in Sydney, Australia and included plans to visit several sites en route of ecological importance or which were susceptible to environmental issues caused by global warming, for instance the current sea level rise, ocean acidification and marine pollution.

Plastiki arrived in Sydney Harbour on July 26, 2010, accompanied by a small flotilla of boats. Shortly afterwards, it was towed to the Australian National Maritime Museum in Darling Harbour, where it was on display until late August.

== Crew ==
- David Mayer de Rothschild – Expedition Leader.
- Jo Royle – Skipper.
- David Thompson – co-skipper.
- Olav Heyerdahl (grandson of Norwegian explorer Thor Heyerdahl).
- Graham Hill – Founder of TreeHugger.
- Luca Babini – Photographer.
- Matthew Gery – Photographer.
- Vern Moen – Recording director.
- Max Jourdan – Filming director for National Geographic.
- Singeli Agnew - Film-maker for National Geographic.

== Documentary ==
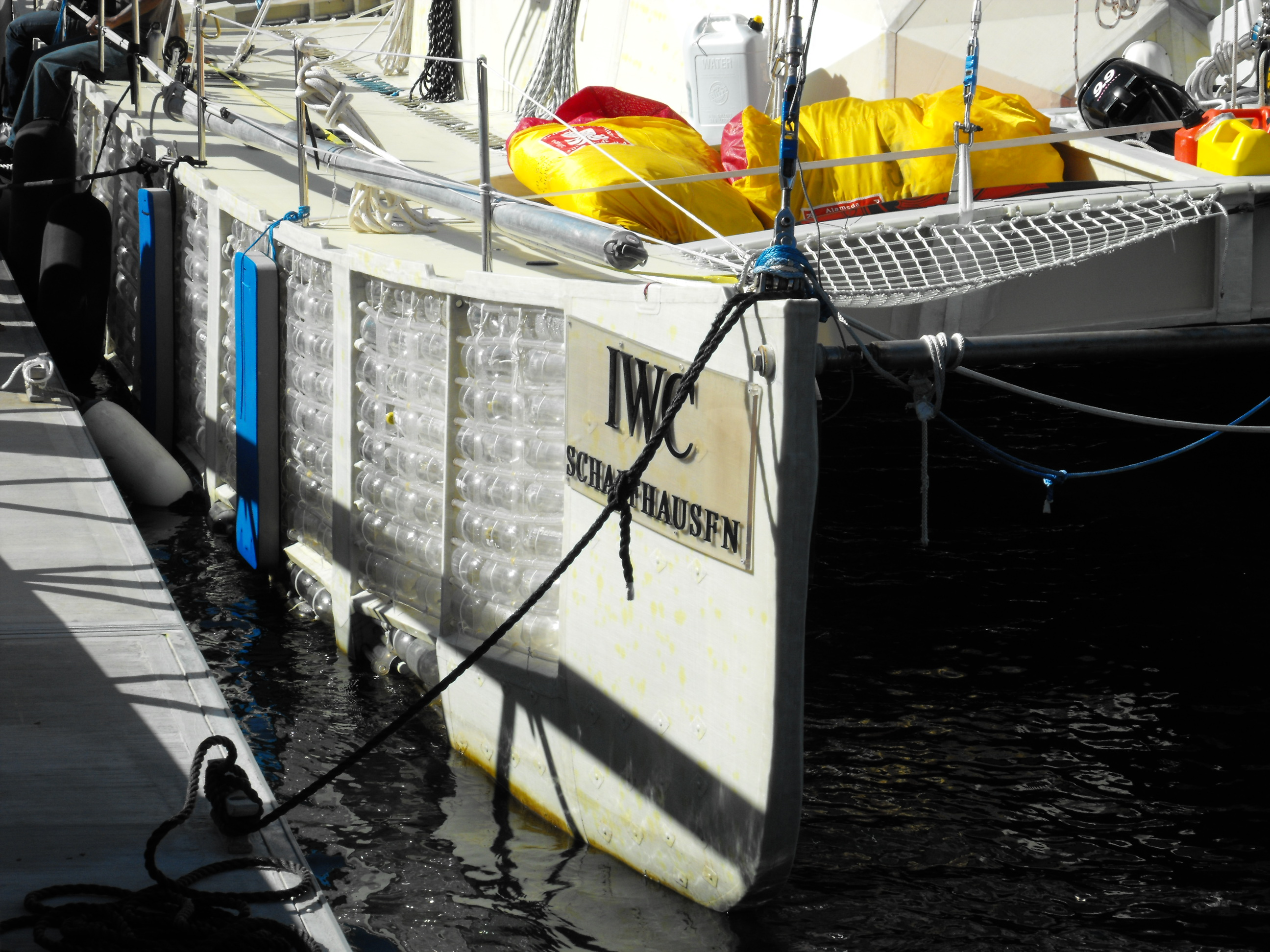
Closeup of the starboard hull, showing the plastic bottles used for flotation

The documentary following the story of Plastiki and the state of the world's plastic use was titled Plastiki & the Material of the Future. Although never widely released, it screened at Mountain Film Festival in Telluride, Colorado. According to the production company's website the aspect of the film that had to do specifically with plastics has been re-edited and named simply The Material of the Future and premiered at the Friday Harbor Film Festival in Washington on November 7, 2014. There has been no official announcement as to why the film has been separated from the Plastiki.

== See also ==
- Nice Collective
- Junk raft
- Project Kaisei
- Great Pacific Garbage Patch
