= The Wonderful World of Sam Cooke =

Compilation album by Sam Cooke
- Released: October 1960
- Genre: Rhythm and blues, soul
- Length: 23:23
- Label: Keen

Sam Cooke chronology
Hits of the 50's (1960)	The Wonderful World of Sam Cooke (1960)	Swing Low (1961)

Singles from The Wonderful World of Sam Cooke
- 1. "Wonderful World" Released: April 14, 1960; 2. "With You" Released: July 1960

The Wonderful World of Sam Cooke is a compilation album by American singer-songwriter Sam Cooke, released by Keen Records in October 1960.

== Track listing ==
=== Side one ===
1. "Wonderful World" – 2:09
2. "Desire Me" – 2:52
3. "Summertime Part. 1" – 2:21
4. "Almost in Your Arms" – 2:01
5. "That's Heaven to Me" – 2:20
6. "No One Can Take Your Place" – 2 :22

=== Side two ===
1. "With You" – 2:34
2. "Blue Moon" – 2:45
3. "Stealing Kisses" – 2:09
4. "You Were Made for Me" – 2:52
5. "There! I've Said It Again" – 1:58
6. "I Thank God" – 3:00
