= So Long (Russ Morgan song) =

Single by The Charioteers
- B-side: "The Gaucho Serenade"
- Released: April 1940
- Recorded: March 4, 1940
- Genre: Traditional pop
- Length: 2:31
- Label: Columbia
- Songwriters: Russ Morgan, Remus Harris, Irving Melsher

"So Long" is a song written by Remus Harris, Russ Morgan and Irving Melsher in 1940 and later recorded by Russ Morgan and his orchestra.

The song was first a hit for the Charioteers, whose single reached number 23 on the U.S. pop chart in 1940. The best-known version was recorded by Ruth Brown, whose rendition reached number 6 on the U.S. Billboard R&B chart in 1949. The Four Aces' cover, backed by the Jack Pleis Orchestra, peaked at number 26 on the U.S. Billboard Hot 100 chart in 1954. Roy Hamilton's cover peaked at number 14 on the U.S. Billboard R&B chart in 1957.

The song was also covered by Sam Cooke for his 1957 debut album Sam Cooke, Sarah Vaughan on her 1962 album You're Mine You, James Brown in the mid-1960s and again with a funk version in the mid-1970s, Aretha Franklin in 1969 for her album of cover material, Soul '69, Pat Benatar for her 1991 album True Love, and Dr. John on the 1995 album Afterglow.

Additional recordings include versions by Johnny Moore's Three Blazers, Charles Brown, the Ramsey Lewis Trio, the Orioles, the Three Chuckles, Big Maybelle, Floyd Dixon, the Castaways, JAY-EL, and Georges Jouvin.
