= Sam Cooke (album) =

Studio album by Sam Cooke
- Released: January or February 1958
- Recorded: 30:16
- Genre: Rhythm and blues, traditional pop, swing
- Label: Keen
- Producer: Bumps Blackwell

Sam Cooke chronology
Sam Cooke (1958)	Encore (1958)

Singles from Sam Cooke
- 1. "You Send Me" Released: September 7, 1957

Sam Cooke is the debut studio album by American singer-songwriter Sam Cooke, released on Keen Records in early 1958. The backing band is the Bumps Blackwell Orchestra.

== Track listing ==
Side 1

1. "You Send Me" (Sam Cooke, originally credited to L.C. Cook) – 2:41
2. "The Lonesome Road" (Gene Austin, Nathaniel Shilkret) – 2:31
3. "Tammy" (Jay Livingston, Ray Evans) – 3:30
4. "Ol' Man River" (Jerome Kern, Oscar Hammerstein II) – 2:39
5. "Moonlight in Vermont" (John Blackburn, Karl Suessdorf) – 2:40
6. "Canadian Sunset" (Eddie Heywood, Norman Gimbel) – 2:57

Side 2

7. "Summertime" (DuBose Heyward, George Gershwin) – 2:25
8. "Around the World" (Harold Adamson, Victor Young) – 1:58
9. "Ain't Misbehavin'" (Andy Razaf, Fats Waller, Harry Brooks) – 2:05
10. "The Bells of St. Mary" (A. Emmett Adams, Douglas Furber) – 2:17
11. "So Long" (Remus Harris, Russ Morgan, Irving Melsher) – 2:38
12. "Danny Boy" (Frederic Weatherly) – 2:16
13. "That Lucky Old Sun" (Beasley Smith, Haven Gillespie) – 2:19

== Personnel ==
On "You Send Me" and "Summertime"

- Clifton White, René Hall – guitar
- Ted Brinson – bass guitar
- Earl Palmer – drums
- Lee Gotch, The Pied Pipers – backing vocals

== Charts ==
=== Weekly charts ===
Chart (1958)	Peak position
Billboard Top LPs	16
