= Ain't That Good News (song) =

"Good News"

Single by Sam Cooke

from the album Ain't That Good News
- B-side: "Basin Street Blues" (RCA 8299 & 1386); "Little Red Rooster" (RCA 07070)
- Released: January 22, 1964
- Recorded: December 20, 1963; RCA Studio, Hollywood, California
- Genre: R&B, soul
- Length: 2:30
- Label: RCA; 07070
- Songwriter: Sam Cooke
- Producer: Hugo & Luigi

Sam Cooke singles chronology
"Another Saturday Night" (1963)	"Good News" (1964)	"Good Times" (1964)

Audio sample
- file; help

"Ain't That Good News", also known as "Good News", is a song written and performed by soul singer Sam Cooke, released on RCA Records in 1964. The song was recorded in three takes for the 1964 album of the same name and reached number eleven on the pop chart, and number one on the Cash Box R&B charts as a single. Cooke performed the song live on American Bandstand on April 4 of the same year. It is a modern adaptation of an older gospel song of the same title.

== Music ==
The song was the first piece of new material that Cooke had recorded in the six months following the drowning death of his 18-month-old son Vincent. After reaching a new deal with RCA Records, Cooke received more creative freedom in his work and had chosen a fine line of session musicians to accompany him. Known for his gospel roots, Cooke often used church influences in his music. "Ain't That Good News" is a secular reworking of an old spiritual. The spiritual's lyrics proclaimed the singer's faith and love for Jesus, built around gospel themes and a slow gospel tempo with an underlying pulsating drive. Cooke, however, transformed the song into an up-tempo soulful number with an upbeat horn and rhythm section. Cooke's version has the same feel, passion, and soul as the original, but is about the faith and love of a woman.

== Reception ==
Cash Box said that Cooke "lashes out with expected polish and vigor on this happy-sounding affair" and said that the song "has that top ten sound."

== Personnel ==
Credits for the song adapted from album liner notes.

- Sam Cooke - vocals

Horn Section

- John Ewing - trombone
- Jewell Grant - saxophone
- William Green - saxophone
- Edgar Redmond - saxophone

Rhythm Section

- Joseph Gibbons - guitar, banjo
- Edward Hall - drums, percussion
- René Hall - guitar
- Howard Roberts - guitar
- John Pisano - guitar
- Emil Radocchia - marimba, tympani, percussion
- Clifton White - guitar
- Eddie Tilman - bass

== Cover versions ==
Cooke's version was later covered by many acts, such as:

- The Supremes (led by Florence Ballard)
- Otis Rush
- David Fathead Newman
- King Curtis
- Ian Moss
