= The Charioteers =

American gospel and pop vocal group from 1930 to 1957

- Origin: Wilberforce, Ohio, United States
- Genres: Gospel, pop
- Years active: 1930–1957
- Labels: Decca, Vocalion, V-Disc, Vocalion, Brunswick, Columbia
- Past members: Wilfred "Billy" Williams (lead tenor); Edward Jackson (second tenor); Ira Williams (baritone); Howard Daniel (vocal); Herbert Dickerson (vocal); Peter Leubers (vocal); John Harewood (vocal); Jimmy Sherman (piano)

The Charioteers were an American gospel and pop vocal group from 1930 to 1957.

== History ==
The Charioteers were put together in 1930 by Professor Howard Daniel at Wilberforce University, in Wilberforce, Ohio. They originally called themselves the Harmony Four. Later they changed the name to the Charioteers, from the song "Swing Low, Sweet Chariot", a favorite in the group's repertoire, which they eventually recorded in 1939. Starting with gospel music, the group expanded its repertoire to include popular songs. Their first break came after they won the Ohio State Quartet contest in 1931; soon after, they were engaged to perform on the Cincinnati radio station WLW. They stayed with the station for over two years, until another radio series brought them to New York City.

They signed their first recording contract, with Decca Records, in 1935. Between 1935 and 1939 they recorded for V-Disc, Vocalion, Brunswick, and Decca without having a hit, yet their popularity grew through radio and live performances. The Charioteers recorded with major singers between 1935 and 1945: Pearl Bailey, on the recordings "Who?" and "Don't Ever Leave Me" in 1945, and Frank Sinatra, on the recordings "Lily Belle", "Don't Forget Tonight, Tomorrow", "I've Got A Home in That Rock", and "Jesus Is a Rock (In a Weary Land)", also in 1945. In 1938, they signed with Columbia Records, where they would stay for over 10 years.

In 1941 they sang in 1404 performances of the musical revue Hellzapoppin', a Broadway hit. They were the studio chorus on Bing Crosby's radio program, Kraft Music Hall, from 1942 to 1946.

The group's leader, Wilfred "Billy" Williams (1910–1972), a recording member for 14 years, left the Charioteers and formed a new group, the Billy Williams Quartet, in the early 1950s. The rest of the Charioteers also left Columbia in 1950 and drifted through five labels over the next seven years.

The Charioteers released 75 single recordings over 22 years. Their last recording was "The Candles", for MGM Records, in 1957.

== Hit recordings ==
Their solo hits include "So Long" (1940, number 23 pop), "On the Boardwalk in Atlantic City" (1946, number 12 pop), "Open the Door, Richard" (1947, number 6 pop), "What Did He Say?" (1948, number 21 pop), "Ooh! Look-a-There, Ain't She Pretty?" (1948, number 20 pop), and "A Kiss and a Rose" (1949, number 8 R&B, number 19 pop).

== Awards ==
The Charioteers were inducted in the Vocal Group Hall of Fame in 2003.

== Discography ==
=== Selected albums ===
Year	Title	Genre	Label
1957	The Charioteers	Gospel	Harmony
1949	Sweet & Low	Gospel/Popular	Columbia

=== Charting singles ===
Year	Single	US Pop
1940	"So Long"	23
1945	"Don't Forget Tonight Tomorrow" (Frank Sinatra and the Charioteers)	9
1946	"On the Boardwalk (In Atlantic City)"	12
1947	"Open the Door, Richard"	6
1947	"Chi-Baba, Chi-Baba (My Bambino Go to Sleep)"	16
1948	"What Did He Say?"	21
1948	"Ooh! Look-a-There, Ain't She Pretty?"	20
1948	"Now Is the Hour (Māori Farewell Song)" (Buddy Clark and the Charioteers)	6
1949	"A Kiss and a Rose"	19
