= Jimmy Sherman =

American jazz musician

James Benjamin Sherman (August 17, 1908 in Williamsport, Pennsylvania – October 11, 1975 in Philadelphia) was an American jazz pianist and arranger.

Sherman played in dance bands in the late 1920s and played on and off with Jimmy Gorham in the metropolitan Philadelphia area. In 1930 he began playing on a steamboat in Alphonso Trent's band, then played in the 1930s with Peanuts Holland, Al Sears, Stuff Smith, Lil Armstrong, Putney Dandridge, Mildred Bailey, and Billie Holiday. He became the pianist and arranger for The Charioteers in 1938, remaining with the group until 1952. Following this he played primarily locally in eastern Pennsylvania. In 1960 he took up a residency at Miss Jeanne's Crossroad Tavern in Chester County, Pennsylvania, where he played until shortly before his death.
