= Billy Williams (singer) =

American singer (1910–1972)

- Born: Wilfred Williams; December 28, 1910; Waco, Texas, US
- Died: October 12, 1972 (aged 61); Chicago, Illinois, US
- Resting place: Burr Oak Cemetery

Wilfred Williams (December 28, 1910 – October 12, 1972) was an American singer. He had a successful cover recording of Fats Waller's "I'm Gonna Sit Right Down And Write Myself A Letter" in 1957. The record sold over one million copies, and was awarded a gold disc.

== Early years ==
A Methodist minister's son, Williams was born in Waco, Texas. His early youth was spent in Texas before the family moved to Ohio. Growing up, he sang in choirs at churches where his father was the pastor, with his mother often the choir director. He was frequently a soloist, and he also learned to help her arrange music.

== Military service ==
Williams served in the Army during World War II; he received a medical discharge in 1944.

== Career ==
While a student at Wilberforce University, Williams became the lead singer of the Charioteers; he sang with the group from 1930 to 1950, when he formed his own Billy Williams Quartet with Eugene Dixon, Claude Riddick and John Ball. Many radio and television appearances followed: as regular guests and chorus on the Bing Crosby radio show from 1942 to 1946 and Your Show of Shows with Sid Caesar.

Williams also headed the Billy Williams Revue, "a complete show package of dancers, singers, musicians and comedians". The troupe performed in Canada, the Caribbean, and across the United States.

== Later years ==
By the early 1960s Williams struggled to retain his voice due to complications of diabetes. In the years before his death, Williams worked in New York City with a program to help homeless men.

== Personal life ==
Williams was married to Lois Traverse, and they had two children. In 1957, Traverse had charges of desertion and non-support against him dismissed after the two reached a financial support agreement. The case was heard in Bergen County, New Jersey.

== Death ==
Williams's grave at Burr Oak Cemetery

On October 12, 1972, Williams died in Chicago, Illinois, after having a heart attack. He was 61 years old. He was buried at Burr Oak Cemetery in Alsip.

== Discography ==
=== Charted singles ===
Year	Single	US Pop
1951	"(Why Did I Tell You I Was Going To) Shanghai"	20
1951	"(It's No) Sin"	28
1953	"Pour Me a Glass of Teardrops"	30
1954	"Sh-Boom (Life Could Be a Dream)"	21
1956	"A Crazy Little Palace (That's My Home)"	49
1957	"The Pied Piper"	50
1957	"I'm Gonna Sit Right Down and Write Myself a Letter"	3
1957	"Date with the Blues"	—
1957	"Got a Date with an Angel"	78
1958	"Baby, Baby"	78
1958	"I'll Get By (As Long as I Have You)"	87
1959	"Nola"	39
1959	"Goodnight, Irene"	75
"—" denotes releases that did not chart
