= Another Saturday Night =

1963 single by Sam Cooke

Single by Sam Cooke

from the album Ain't That Good News
- B-side: "Love Will Find a Way"
- Released: April 2, 1963
- Recorded: February 28, 1963
- Studio: RCA (Hollywood, California)
- Genre: R&B, soul, ska, comedy
- Length: 2:42
- Label: RCA Victor
- Songwriter: Sam Cooke
- Producer: Hugo & Luigi

Sam Cooke singles chronology
"Bring It On Home to Me" (1963)	"Another Saturday Night" (1963)	"(Ain't That) Good News" (1964)

"Another Saturday Night" is a 1963 hit single by Sam Cooke from the album Ain't That Good News. The song was written by Cooke while touring in England when staying in a hotel where no female guests were allowed. It reached No. 10 on the Billboard Hot 100 and was No. 1 on the R&B chart for a single week. In the UK, the song peaked at No. 23 on the UK Singles Chart. In Canada it reached No. 30.

Cooke's version featured his spoken recitation, which is done during the instrumental break.

Session drummer Hal Blaine played on Cooke's version of the song. Other musicians on the record included John Anderson on trumpet, John Ewing on trombone, Jewell Grant on sax, Ray Johnson on piano, and Clifton White and Rene Hall on guitar, and Clifford Hills on bass.

Cash Box described it as "a tale of a guy who’s got the money, but not the gal to spend it on," stating that "the teen set won’t take the deck seriously, but will find it a highly pleasurable listening/dance floor treat."

== Cat Stevens version ==
"Another Saturday Night"

Single by Cat Stevens
- B-side: "Home in the Sky"
- Released: July 1974
- Studio: RCA
- Genre: Folk rock
- Label: Island (UK/Europe); A&M (USA/Canada)
- Songwriter: Sam Cooke
- Producer: Cat Stevens

Cat Stevens singles chronology
"Oh Very Young" (1974)	"Another Saturday Night" (1974)	"Ready" (1974)

In 1974, Cat Stevens released his own version which peaked at No. 6 on the U.S. Hot 100, No. 13 Easy Listening, No. 1 in Canada twice, on September 28 and October 19, separated by two other No. 1s, and No. 19 in Stevens' UK homeland.

== Chart history ==
=== Weekly charts ===
Chart (1974)	Peak position
Australia (Kent Music Report)	15
Canada RPM Adult Contemporary	20
Canada RPM Top Singles	1
South Africa (Springbok)	13
UK Singles Chart	19
U.S. Billboard Hot 100	6
U.S. Billboard Adult Contemporary	13
U.S. Cash Box Top 100	9

=== Year-end charts ===
Chart (1974)	Rank
Canada RPM Top Singles	31
U.S. (Joel Whitburn's Pop Annual)	80
U.S. Cash Box	83

== Other cover versions ==
- In 1993, Jimmy Buffett recorded the song. His version peaked at No. 74 on the Billboard Hot Country Singles & Tracks chart.
- Sam & Dave recorded at least one version that appears on albums released after their formative years such as the I Thank You compilation released in 2002 by the Brentwood Records label.
- Puerto Rican rock en Español singer Charlie Robles covered the song in Spanish, naming it "Anoche no Dormí" ("I Didn't Sleep Last night"). (in Spanish)
