= Sam Cooke at the Copa =

Live album by Sam Cooke
- Released: October 1964
- Recorded: July 7 & 8, 1964
- Venue: Copacabana, New York City
- Genre: Rhythm and blues, soul, jazz
- Length: 35:37
- Label: RCA Victor
- Producer: Al Schmitt

Sam Cooke chronology
Ain't That Good News (1964)	Sam Cooke at the Copa (1964)	Shake (1965)

Professional ratings
Review scores
Source	Rating
AllMusic	3.5/5 stars
The Encyclopedia of Popular Music	4/5 stars
MusicHound Rock: The Essential Album Guide	3.5/5 stars
The New Rolling Stone Record Guide	2/5 stars
The New Rolling Stone Album Guide	3/5 stars
Record Mirror	5/5 stars

Sam Cooke at the Copa is a live album by American singer-songwriter Sam Cooke. The album was released in 1964 in the United States by RCA Victor. It was Cooke's only live album to be released during his lifetime, and his final release before his death; Live at the Harlem Square Club, 1963, although recorded earlier, was not released until 1985. Sam Cooke at the Copa was reissued in 2003, with remastered sound.

The album peaked at No. 29 on the Billboard 200.

== Production ==
The album was recorded during a two-week stand in July 1964. The shows during the 1964 engagement were well received, in contrast to a show Cooke performed at the Copa in 1958. Staying away from the Copa—and from many "white" clubs—for years, Cooke was inspired to return after watching Nat King Cole go over well there. Cooke chose to perform a set heavier on standards and show tunes.

Sam Cooke at the Copa was produced by Al Schmitt. It was recorded on 3 tracks, and was engineered by Bernard Keville.

== Critical reception ==
AllMusic wrote: "One of a handful of live albums by a major soul artist of its era, it captured Cooke in excellent voice, and was well-recorded -- it just wasn't really a 'soul' album, except perhaps in the tamest possible definition of that term." The New Rolling Stone Album Guide called the album "genial, and even a bit cheesy in a jivey, Vegas kind of way, but nonetheless spirited in its own right." The Chicago Tribune wrote that Cooke's "fluttering yodel and charming demeanor make evident that he knew he had crashed through the invisible ceiling, hurdling the only barrier he hadn't yet cleared and solidifying his status as the ultimate crossover artist."

The Times wrote that the album "captures the more decorous version of the singer’s live act." Praising the sound of the 2003 reissue, The Baltimore Sun wrote that Cooke "still manages to imbue such stuffy standards as 'Frankie and Johnny', 'If I Had a Hammer' and 'Tennessee Waltz' with gospel-dipped exuberance."

== Track listing ==
=== Side one ===
1. "Opening Introduction" – 0:35
2. "The Best Things in Life are Free" (Lew Brown, Buddy DeSylva, Ray Henderson) – 1:31
3. "Bill Bailey Won't You Please Come Home" (Hughie Cannon) – 2:50
4. "Nobody Knows You When You're Down and Out" (James Cox) – 3:18
5. "Frankie and Johnny" (Cooke) – 3:00
6. Medley: "Try a Little Tenderness" / "(I Love You) For Sentimental Reasons" / "You Send Me" (William Best / Sam Cooke / Deek Watson) – 4:55
7. "If I Had a Hammer" (Lee Hays, Pete Seeger) – 6:25

=== Side two ===
1. "When I Fall in Love" (Edward Heyman, Victor Young) – 3:05
2. "Twistin' the Night Away" (Cooke) – 5:04
3. "This Little Light of Mine" (Cooke) – 3:36
4. "Blowin' in the Wind" (Bob Dylan) – 3:01
5. "Tennessee Waltz" (Pee Wee King, Redd Stewart) – 3:36

== Personnel ==
All credits adapted from the album's remastered liner notes.

Sam Cooke's Band

- Sam Cooke – vocals
- Harper Cosby – bass guitar
- Sticks Evans – percussion
- June Gardner – drums
- Clifton White – guitar
- Bobby "Valentino" Womack – guitar

Joe Mele's Copacabana Band

- Joe Mele – leader
- Joseph Fogila – saxophone, flute
- John Altman – saxophone, clarinet, flute
- George Barrow – saxophone, clarinet
- Anthony Ferina – saxophone, clarinet
- Richard Kamuca – saxophone, clarinet
- William Smith – saxophone, clarinet
- Alfred Cobbs – trombone
- Virgil Davis – trombone
- Ronald Plumby – trombone
- Richard Harris – trombone
- Bart Varsalona – trombone
- Clyde Reasinger – trumpet
- George Triffon – trumpet
- Louis Mauro – bass guitar
- Eugene Padden – bass guitar

Production

- Bernard Keville – engineer
- Al Schmitt – record producer

== Charts ==
Chart (1964)	Peak position
US Billboard Top LPs	29
US Top R&B Albums	1

== See also ==
- List of Billboard number-one R&B albums of the 1960s
