= Cooke's Tour =

Studio album by Sam Cooke
- Released: May 1960
- Recorded: March 2–3, 1960
- Studio: RCA Victor, New York City
- Genre: Rhythm and blues
- Length: 33:04
- Label: RCA Victor
- Producer: Hugo & Luigi

Sam Cooke chronology
Tribute to the Lady (1959)	Cooke's Tour (1960)	Hits of the 50's (1960)

Cooke's Tour is the fourth studio album by American singer-songwriter Sam Cooke, released in May 1960 and his first for RCA Victor.

The album was remastered in 2011 as a part of The RCA Albums Collection.

== Background ==
As Keen's marketing was limited, Sam Cooke began to shop around to other labels in February 1960. Interest was immediate from labels such as Atlantic and Capitol, but Cooke signed with Hugo Peretti and Luigi Creatore at RCA Victor, who offered a $100,000 advance. RCA Victor had previously signed Jesse Belvin, Della Reese and The Isley Brothers, and Peretti and Creatore were set on making Cooke an international album artist.

Cooke's Tour, recorded on March 2 and 3, 1960, is an "adventurous travelogue" that explores various territories around the world. Glen Osser wrote arrangements and conducted the album's orchestra, which was an R&B rhythm section and a fifteen-piece string ensemble. Cooke was closest to the album's final track, "The House I Live In," as he had just moved into his dream home in Leimert Park, Los Angeles.

== Track listing ==
All songs arranged and conducted by Glen Osser.

=== Side one ===
1. "Far Away Places" (Joan Whitney Kramer, Alex Kramer) – 3:28
2. "Under Paris Skies" (Hubert Giraud, Kim Gannon, Jean Dréjac) – 3:10
3. "South of the Border (Down Mexico Way)" (Jimmy Kennedy, Michael Carr) – 3:10
4. "Bali Ha'i" (Richard Rodgers, Oscar Hammerstein II) – 3:17
5. "The Coffee Song (They've Got An Awful Lot of Coffee in Brazil)" (Bob Hilliard, Richard Miles) – 2:02
6. "Arrivederci, Roma (Goodbye to Rome)" (Carl Sigman, Renato Rascel) – 2:47

=== Side two ===
1. "London by Night" (Carroll Coates) – 3:34
2. "Jamaica Farewell" (Irving Burgie) – 2:32
3. "Galway Bay" (Dr. Arthur Colahan) – 3:00
4. "Sweet Leilani" (Harry Owens) – 2:48
5. "The Japanese Farewell Song" (Hasegawa Yoshida, Freddy Morgan) – 2:57
6. "The House I Live In" (Lewis Allen, Earl Robinson) – 3:19

== Personnel ==
All credits adapted from The RCA Albums Collection (2011) liner notes.

- Sam Cooke – vocals
- Al Hanlon, Charles Macey, Clifton White, Al Chernet – guitar
- Lloyd Trotman, George Duvivier – bass guitar
- Bunny Shawker – drums
- George Gabor – percussion
- Hank Jones, Morris Wechsler – piano
- Jerome Weiner, Joe Small – flute
- Hinda Barnett, Arcadie Berkenholz, James Bloom, Fred Buidrini, Morris Lefkowitz, Felix Orlewitz, Frank Siegfried, Ralph Silverman, Harry Urbont, Paul Winter, James Bloom, Anthony DiGirolamo, Ben Miller, David Nadien – violin
- Isadore Zir – viola
- Ray Schweitzer – cello
- Abe Rosen – harp
- Glenn Osser – arrangement, conducting
- Ray Hall – recording engineer
- Bob Witt – photography
