= Encore (Sam Cooke album) =

Studio album by Sam Cooke
- Released: 1958
- Genre: Rhythm and blues, traditional pop
- Length: 31:53
- Label: Keen
- Producer: Bumps Blackwell

Sam Cooke chronology
Sam Cooke (1958)	Encore (1958)	Tribute to the Lady (1959)

Encore is the second studio album by American singer-songwriter Sam Cooke, released by Keen Records in 1958. Produced and arranged by Bumps Blackwell, it features songs such as "My Foolish Heart" and "When I Fall in Love".

The album was part of a gradual shift toward more elaborate productions of Cooke's songs, adding horns to six out of twelve tracks. The cover features Cooke in a grey suit with close-cropped hair.

== Track listing ==
=== Side one ===
1. "Oh! Look at Me Now" (Joe Bushkin, John DeVries) – 2:51
2. "Someday" (Johnny Hodges) – 2:14
3. "Along the Navajo Trail" (Dick Charles, Eddie DeLange, Larry Markes) – 3:05
4. "Running Wild" (Arthur Gibbs, Joe Grey, Leo Wood) – 1:25
5. "Ac-Cent-Tchu-Ate the Positive" (Harold Arlen, Johnny Mercer) – 3:24
6. "Mary, Mary Lou" (Cayet Mangiaracina) – 2:44

=== Side two ===
1. "When I Fall in Love" (Albert Felden) – 2:41
2. "I Cover the Waterfront" (Edward Heyman, Johnny Green) – 2:11
3. "My Foolish Heart" (H. Martin, J. Ward, S. Brown) – 2:20
4. "Today I Sing the Blues" (Cliff White, Curtis Lewis) – 3:20
5. "The Gypsy" (Billy Reid) – 2:30
6. "It's the Talk of the Town" (Al Neiburg, Jay Livingston, Marty Symes) – 3:08

== When I Fall in Love / My Foolish Heart ==
Two errors appear in the credits of "When I Fall in Love". The composer is credited as Albert Felden, but it should be Albert Selden, co-producer of Man of La Mancha who in 1948 composed a song titled When I Fall in Love for the Broadway revue Small Wonder. But, in fact, Sam Cooke sings the 'other' song, the popular "When I Fall in Love" composed for the film One Minute to Zero by Victor Young with lyrics by Edward Heyman.

Victor Young also composed "My Foolish Heart", with lyrics by Ned Washington, for the 1949 film My Foolish Heart. However, the song is credited to H. Martin, J. Ward and S. Brown. Young died on November 10, 1956, two years before the release of this album.
