= Hits of the 50's =

Studio album by Sam Cooke
- Released: August 1960
- Recorded: March 23–24, 1960
- Studio: RCA Victor, New York City
- Genre: Traditional pop, rhythm and blues
- Length: 33:37
- Label: RCA Victor
- Producer: Hugo & Luigi

Sam Cooke chronology
Cooke's Tour (1960)	Hits of the 50's (1960)	The Wonderful World of Sam Cooke (1960)

Hits of the 50's is the fifth studio album by American singer-songwriter Sam Cooke. Produced by Hugo & Luigi, the album was released in August 1960 by RCA Victor. Hits of the 50's consists of Cooke's versions of songs originally sung by such artists as Nat King Cole, Frankie Avalon, and Doris Day.

The album was remastered in 2011 as a part of The RCA Albums Collection.

== Background ==
Hits of the 50's was recorded only two weeks following the sessions that produced Cooke's Tour in March 1960, over a month prior to the release of that album. The bulk of the album was recorded on March 23, 1960, with the remaining numbers—"The Great Pretender", "You, You, You", "The Wayward Wind", "Cry", and "Venus"—being recorded the following day. Many of the same musicians who recorded on Cooke's Tour returned for Hits of the 50's.

== Track listing ==
All songs arranged and conducted by Glen Osser.

=== Side one ===
1. "Hey There" (Richard Adler, Jerry Ross) – 2:32
2. "Mona Lisa" (Ray Evans, Jay Livingston) – 2:34
3. "Too Young" (Sidney Lippman, Sylvia Dee) – 2:08
4. "The Great Pretender" (Buck Ram) – 3:02
5. "You, You, You" (Olias Lotar, Robert Mellin) – 2:45
6. "Unchained Melody" (Alex North, Hy Zaret) – 3:24

=== Side two ===
1. "The Wayward Wind" (Stanley Lebowsky, Herbert Newman) – 3:10
2. "Secret Love" (Sammy Fain, Paul Francis Webster) – 2:46
3. "The Song from Moulin Rouge" (Georges Auric, William Engvick) – 2:30
4. "I'm Walking Behind You" (Billy Reid) – 2:45
5. "Cry" (Churchill Kohlman) – 2:13
6. "Venus" (Ed Marshall, Peter DeAngelis) – 2:53

== Personnel ==
All credits adapted from The RCA Albums Collection (2011) liner notes.

- Sam Cooke – vocals
- Al Casamenti, Barry Galbraith, Charles Macey, Clifton White, Arthur Ryerson – guitar
- Lloyd Trotman – bass guitar
- Bunny Shawker – drums
- George Gaber – percussion
- Andy Ackers – piano
- James Buffington, Anthony Miranda – French horn
- Julius Baker, Jerome Weiner – flute
- Eddie Costa – vibraphone
- Gloria Agostini, Laura Newell – harp
- Glenn Osser – arrangement, conducting
- Bob Simpson – recording engineer
