= Ain't That Good News =

1964 final studio album by Sam Cooke

Studio album by Sam Cooke
- Released: February 1964
- Recorded: February 28, 1963 – January 30, 1964; Music Center of the World (Hollywood, California)
- Genres: R&B; soul
- Length: 33:25
- Label: RCA Victor
- Producer: Hugo & Luigi

Sam Cooke chronology
3 Great Guys (1963)	Ain't That Good News (1964)	Sam Cooke at the Copa (1964)

Singles from Ain't That Good News
- 1. "Another Saturday Night" Released: April 2, 1963; 2. "(Ain't That) Good News" Released: January 22, 1964; 3. "Good Times" Released: July 9, 1964; 4. "Tennessee Waltz" Released: July 9, 1964; 5. "A Change Is Gonna Come" Released: December 22, 1964

Professional ratings
Review scores
Source	Rating
AllMusic	4/5 stars
Melody Maker	4.5/5 stars
Q	4/5 stars

Ain't That Good News is the eleventh and final studio album by the American R&B and soul singer-songwriter Sam Cooke. It was released in February 1964 through RCA Victor Records. Recording sessions for the album took place at RCA Victor's Music Center of the World Studio in February and December 1963 and January 1964. The cover photo was taken by American photographer Wallace Seawell. Ain't That Good News was the final studio album to be issued during Cooke's lifetime, before his death at the age of 33. With the exception of "Another Saturday Night", which had been released as a single early in the previous year, Ain't That Good News comprised the first material that Cooke had recorded in the six months following the drowning death of his 18-month-old son Vincent.

The first album that Cooke recorded and released under his new contract with RCA, Ain't That Good News reached No. 34 on the Billboard Pop Albums chart. The album contains "A Change Is Gonna Come", one of Cooke's best-known songs. Though only a modest hit for Cooke in comparison with his previous singles, the song came to exemplify the Civil Rights Movement during the 1960s. The song has gained in popularity and critical acclaim in the decades since its release. Five of the tracks on Ain't That Good News were released as singles. Ain't That Good News was reissued in hybrid CD/Super Audio CD format by ABKCO Records in June 2003 with full music and session credits.

== Music ==
"(Ain't That) Good News"
The opening track is a secular adaptation of a gospel tune.

"A Change Is Gonna Come"
The album's and Sam Cooke's most well-known recording featured orchestral arrangements.

A record that featured one side of harder soul numbers and another of mellower ballads, much like R&B musician Ray Charles' Modern Sounds records, Ain't That Good News reflects Cooke's greater freedom in choosing material and sidemen. Therefore, it offered much pent-up emotional and musical expression, which was unique in the Cooke's output. Musically, Ain't That Good News features two sides of different stylistic approaches by Sam Cooke. According to record producers Luigi Creatore and Hugo Peretti, the first side of the album is "strong and rockin'," while the second side, "ballads....deep and soulful." They went on to write of the album:

In many ways this is a tribute to the developed talents of Sam Cooke. As the skillful and polished performer that he was, Cooke could take any kind of song material and bring it on home to his audience so that it means something.

— Hugo & Luigi

Side one features the nostalgic "Good Times", written by Cooke, and "Another Saturday Night", which he wrote when staying in a hotel room where no female guests were allowed during a tour of the United Kingdom The rolling chorus of "Meet Me at Mary's Place" was also written by Cooke about a gospel promoter in Charlotte, North Carolina where gospel groups often stayed. The country-style "Tennessee Waltz" is given new life here, while the title track, done out of the gospel tradition, would be his greatest hit until the central number on this album. "A Change Is Gonna Come", with its soaring gospel sound and powerful first-person language, was written in response to Dylan's protest anthem "Blowin' in the Wind" and became one of popular music's most well-known message songs, as well as Sam Cooke's signature recording.

Following the centerpiece are orchestrated ballads and standards that are arranged by conductor René Hall. Cooke gives the Irving Berlin tune, "Sittin' in the Sun", a powerful reading as he does with "Home". Ending on a somber and emotional note, the album closes with Sam Cooke's rendition of the traditional Appalachian ballad "The Riddle Song". According to string section leader Sid Sharp, Sam Cooke started to cry at the line "I gave my love a baby with no crying", which was reminiscent of the loss of Cooke's infant child, Vincent.

== Track listing ==
All songs written by Sam Cooke, except where noted.

Side one

1. "Ain't That Good News" – 2:30
2. "Meet Me at Mary's Place" – 2:44
3. "Good Times" – 2:28
4. "Rome Wasn't Built in a Day" (Sam Cooke, Beverly Prudhomme, Betty Prudhomme) – 2:34
5. "Another Saturday Night" – 2:42
6. "Tennessee Waltz" (Pee Wee King, Redd Stewart) – 3:12

Side two

7. "A Change Is Gonna Come" – 3:13
8. "Falling in Love" (Harold Battiste) – 2:45
9. "Home" (Jeff Clarkson, Harry Clarkson, Peter van Steeden) – 2:32
10. "Sittin' in the Sun" (Irving Berlin) – 3:18
11. "No Second Time" (Clifton White) – 3:03
12. "The Riddle Song" (Traditional) – 2:30

== Chart history ==
=== Album ===
Chart (1964)	Peak position
US Billboard 200	34

=== Singles ===
Release Date	Title	Peak positions		
Release Date	Title	US Hot 100	US R&B singles	UK singles
April 2, 1963	"Another Saturday Night"	10	1	23
January 22, 1964	"(Ain't That) Good News"	11	*	–
July 9, 1964	"Good Times"	11	*	–
July 9, 1964	"Tennessee Waltz"	35	*	–
December 22, 1964	"A Change Is Gonna Come"	31	9	–

* Between late 1963 and late 1964, Billboard did not publish an R&B singles chart.

== Personnel ==
- Guitar: Norman Bartold, LeRoy Crume, Barney Kessel, John Pisano, Allan Reuss, Howard Roberts, Clifton White
- Bass guitar: Peter Badie, Buddy Clark, Clifford Hils, Ray Pohlman, Eddie Tilman
- Banjo: Joseph Gibbons
- Piano: Harold Battiste, Ray Johnson, Lincoln Mayorga
- Drums: Hal Blaine, John Boudreaux, Edward Hall, Earl Palmer
- Percussion: Linwood Mitchell, Emil Richards
- Saxophone: Jewell Grant, William Green, Plas Johnson, Edgar Redmond, Red Tyler
- French horn: William Hinshaw
- Violin & viola: Israel Baker, Robert Barene, Arnold Belnick, John DeVoogdt, Harry Hyams,
  William Kurasch, Irving Lipschultz, Leonard Malarsky, Alexander Neiman, Jack Pepper, Ralph Schaeffer, Sid Sharp,
  Darrell Terwilliger, Tibor Zeli
- Cello: Jesse Ehrlich, Emmet Sargeant
- Trumpet: John Anderson, Melvin Lastie
- Trombone: Milt Bernhart, Harry Betts, Louis Blackburn, Streamline Ewing, John Halliburton, Ernest Tack, David Wells
- Backing Vocals: Jimmy Bryant, Gwenn Johnson, Carol Lombard, The Soul Stirrers, Robert Tebow, George Tipton, Jackie Ward

== Release history ==
An official reissue of Ain't That Good News came nearly forty years after its initial 1964 release on LP format. The reissued compact disc of the album featured Super-Audio and Hybrid format, also known as Super High Material, which enhanced audio quality through the use of polycarbonate plastic. Using a process developed by JVC and Universal Music Japan and discovered through the joint companies' research of LCD manufacturing, these CDs featured improved transparency on the data side of the disc, allowing for more accurate reading of the data by the CD player laser head. The reissues were fully compatible with standard CD players, and are listed below:

Region	Date	Label	Format	Catalog
United States	March 1, 1964	RCA Victor	mono vinyl LP	LPM-2899
United States	March 1, 1964	RCA Victor	stereo vinyl LP	LSP-2899
United Kingdom	March 1, 1964	RCA	mono vinyl LP	RD-7635
United Kingdom	March 1, 1964	RCA	stereo vinyl LP	SF-7635
United States	June 17, 2003	ABKCO	CD reissue	ABKCO-98992
Europe	2003	Universal	CD reissue	UMG-9907707
Japan	July 30, 2008	Universal Japan	CD reissue	UICY-93546
