= Nice Collective =

Designer clothing brand

Nice Collective is a San Francisco based designer clothing brand founded in 1997, by dance musicians Joe Haller and Ian Hannula. According to the designers, their first creations were combinations of streetwear they designed for themselves. Though the brand focuses on menswear, Haller and Hannula said they also create collections for women.

== Background ==
Joe Haller was raised in New York, and into his 20s worked as a radiology tech. During his off hours, he produced dance music and organized parties in clubs around New York City. A professional bike racer, Ian Hannula was raised in Atlanta, Georgia and studied combat photography in the Marine Corps. He created dance music events in Atlanta and was a resident DJ in two top clubs. Joe and Ian met on the dance floor in San Francisco in 1995. Their connection was instant, fueled by their common interests in art, music, and fashion. They initially started Nice Collective as a loose amalgamation of talent that would launch parties and club nights, a record label, a DJ agency, and a clothing line. Though neither had any fashion training, Haller and Hannula began by producing experimental pieces such as deconstructed and reconstructed camouflage shirts, pullover sweaters made from electric blankets, and shirts that transformed into kites.

== Public profile ==
In February 2010, Haller and Hannula collaborated with environmentalist David de Rothschild on the launch of Plastiki, a boat made from discarded plastic water bottles that set sail from San Francisco to Australia.

Nice Collective was featured in GQ Magazine's roundup of 'The Best New Designers in America' in 2007. The line has outfitted tours for Coldplay, Nine Inch Nails, Smashing Pumpkins and The Police.

After a multi-year absence, Nice Collective returned to New York Fashion Week in February 2009 with the “Time Machine” collections. New York fashion writer Josh Peskowitz of men.style.com described the clothes as having “something post-apocalyptic–not to mention post-erotic.”

== Collection history ==
- Fall 2010 - "Voices"
- Spring 2010 - "The Gathering"
- Fall 2009 - "Time Machine"
- Spring 2009 - "Voix de Ville"
- Fall 2008 - "New Romantics"
