= Swing Low (album) =

Studio album by Sam Cooke
- Released: February 1961
- Recorded: January 25, 1960 ("Chain Gang"); September 9–10, 1960
- Studio: RCA Victor, New York City
- Genre: Rhythm and blues, soul, gospel
- Length: 36:25
- Label: RCA Victor
- Producer: Hugo & Luigi

Sam Cooke chronology
The Wonderful World of Sam Cooke (1960)	Swing Low (1961)	My Kind of Blues (1961)

Singles from Swing Low
- 1. "Chain Gang" Released: July 26, 1960

Swing Low, also known as Sam Cooke, is the sixth studio album by American singer-songwriter Sam Cooke. Produced by Hugo & Luigi, the album was released in February 1961 in the United States by RCA Victor. The album includes the hit single "Chain Gang".

The album was remastered in 2011 as a part of The RCA Albums Collection.

== Track listing ==
=== Side one ===
1. "Swing Low, Sweet Chariot" (Traditional) – 3:05
2. "I'm Just a Country Boy" (Fred Hellerman, Marshall Barer) – 4:05
3. "They Call the Wind Maria" (Alan Jay Lerner, Frederick Loewe) – 2:54
4. "Twilight on the Trail" (Sidney D. Mitchell, Louis Alter) – 3:10
5. "If I Had You" (Sam Cooke, James W. Alexander) – 2:20
6. "Chain Gang" (Cooke) – 2:32

=== Side two ===
1. "Grandfather's Clock" (Henry Clay Work) – 3:10
2. "Jeanie with the Light Brown Hair" (Stephen Foster) – 3:44
3. "Long, Long Ago" (Thomas Haynes Bayly) – 3:00
4. "Pray" (Johnnie Taylor) – 2:10
5. "You Belong to Me" (Cooke, Alexander) – 2:44
6. "Goin' Home" (Antonín Dvořák, Williams Arms Fisher) – 3:05

== Personnel ==
All credits adapted from The RCA Albums Collection (2011) liner notes. The musicians who recorded "Chain Gang", save for Cooke, Clifton White, George Barnes and Glenn Osser, are unknown.

- Sam Cooke – vocals
- Clifton White, Don Arnone, Everett Barksdale, Al Chernet, George Barnes (on "Chain Gang") – guitar
- Milt Hinton – bass
- Jimmy Crawford, Bunny Shawker – drums
- Hank Jones – piano
- Seldon Powell – saxophone
- Hinda Barnett, Fred Fradkin, Archie Levin, Harry Lookofsky, Ben Miller, David Nadien, Sylvan Shulman – violin
- George Ricci – cello
- Al Brown – viola
- Steve Lipkins, Leon Marian – trumpet
- Henderson Chambers, Albert Godlis, Frank Saracco – trombone
- Sammy Lowe – conductor
- Glenn Osser – conductor on "Chain Gang”
- Bob Simpson – recording engineer
