= Tribute to the Lady =

Studio album by Sam Cooke
- Released: April 1959
- Recorded: January–February 1959
- Genre: Rhythm and blues, traditional pop, jazz
- Length: 30:38
- Label: Keen
- Producer: Hugo & Luigi

Sam Cooke chronology
Encore (1958)	Tribute to the Lady (1959)	Cooke's Tour (1960)

Tribute to the Lady is the third studio album by American singer-songwriter Sam Cooke, released in April 1959. It was recorded in tribute to jazz vocalist Billie Holiday, who died later that year. The backing band is the René Hall Orchestra.

== Track listing ==
=== Side one ===
1. "God Bless the Child" (Arthur Herzog, Jr.) – 2:32
2. "She's Funny That Way" (Charles N. Daniels, Richard A. Whiting) – 1:49
3. "I've Got a Right to Sing the Blues" (Harold Arlen, Ted Koehler) – 2:31
4. "Good Morning Heartache" (Dan Fisher, Ervin Drake, Irene Higginbotham) – 2:06
5. "'T'aint Nobody's Bizness (If I Do)" (Porter Grainger, Everett Robbins) – 2:23
6. "Comes Love" (Lew Brown, Sam H. Stept, Charles Tobias) – 2:38

=== Side two ===
1. "Lover Girl (Man)" (Jimmy Davis, Roger "Ram" Ramirez, James Sherman) – 2:25
2. "Let's Call the Whole Thing Off" (George Gershwin, Ira Gershwin) – 2:19
3. "Lover Come Back to Me" (Sigmund Romberg, Oscar Hammerstein II) – 2:10
4. "Solitude" (Duke Ellington, Eddie DeLange, Irving Mills) – 2:22
5. "They Can't Take That Away from Me" (George Gershwin, Ira Gershwin) – 2:28
6. "Crazy She Calls Me" (Carl Sigman, Bob Russell) – 2:33

== Notes ==
The album was recorded in January & February 1959 in Los Angeles.
