= Chime for Change =

Non-profit campaign organized by Gucci

Chime for Change was a global campaign founded by Gucci to promote gender equality.

As part of the campaign, the Sound for Change Concert aimed to raise awareness and fund for women and girls' education, health and justice worldwide. The concert was a global music event held at Twickenham Stadium, London on Saturday 1 June 2013. It featured performances by artists such as Beyonce Knowles, Jennifer Lopez, Jessie J and Rita Ora. Speakers included Salma Hayek, Madonna and Jada Pinkett Smith. The event raised money for girls' and women's groups globally.

== Background ==
Chime for Change was founded in 2013 by luxury fashion brand Gucci. The organization stated that proceeds would "go entirely to projects aimed to improve the lives of girls and women across the globe." The campaign focuses on education, health, and justice, leveraging the influence of arts and media to spread its message. Itss co-Founders are Salma Hayek Pinault and Beyonce Knowles Carter.

The Sound for Change Concert was held exactly 100 years after suffragette Emily Davison who died after throwing herself in front of horse at the Epsom Derby.
