= Murray's law =

Fluid dynamics concept

In biophysical fluid dynamics, Murray's law is a potential relationship between radii at junctions in a network of fluid-carrying tubular pipes. Its simplest version proposes that whenever a branch of radius $r$ splits into two branches of radii $r_1$ and $r_2$, then the three radii should obey the equation
$$r^3 = r_1^3 + r_2^3\text{.}$$
If network flow is smooth and leak-free, then systems that obey Murray's law minimize the resistance to flow through the network. For turbulent networks, the law takes the same form but with a different characteristic exponent α.

Murray's law is observed in the vascular and respiratory systems of animals, xylem in plants, and the respiratory system of insects. In principle, Murray's law also applies to biomimetic engineering, but human designs rarely exploit the law.

Murray's law is named after Cecil D. Murray, a physiologist at Bryn Mawr College, who first argued that efficient transport might determine the structure of the human vascular system.

== Assumptions ==
Murray's law assumes material is passively transported by the flow of fluid in a network of tubular pipes, and that the network requires energy to maintain both flow and structural integrity. Variation in the fluid viscosity across scales will affect the Murray's law exponent, but is usually too small to matter.

At least two different conditions are known in which the cube exponent is optimal.

In the first, organisms have free (variable) circulatory volume. Also, maintenance energy is not proportional to the pipe material, but instead the quantity of working fluid. The latter assumption is justified in metabolically active biological fluids, such as blood. It is also justified for metabolically inactive fluids, such as air, as long as the energetic "cost" of the infrastructure scales with the cross-sectional area of each tube; such is the case for all known biological tubules.

In the second, organisms have fixed circulatory volume and pressure, but wish to minimize the resistance to flow through the system. Equivalently, maintenance is negligible and organisms with to maximize the volumetric flow rate.

Although most derivations of Murray's law assume a steady state flow field, the same results apply for flow in tubes that have a moderate to small width, relative to the flow wavelength.

== Derivation in laminar, mass-conservative networks with non-negligible upkeep ==
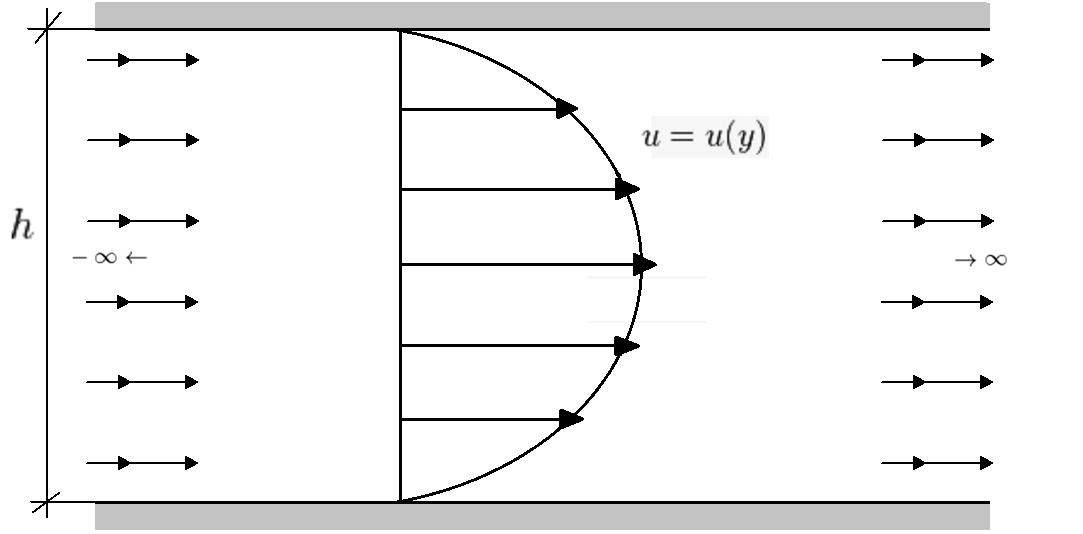
Poiseuille flow in a cylinder of diameter h; the velocity field at height y is u(y).

Murray's original derivation uses the first set of assumptions described above. She begins with the Hagen–Poiseuille equation, which states that for fluid of dynamic viscosity μ, flowing laminarly through a cylindrical pipe of radius r and length l, the volumetric flow rate Q associated with a pressure drop Δp is
$$Q = \frac{\pi}{8\mu}\frac{r^4}{l}\Delta p$$
and the corresponding power consumed is
$$P = \frac{8\mu}{\pi}\frac{lQ^2}{r^4}\text{.}$$
Said pipe contains volume πlr^{2}. If the maintenance power density is λ, then the total power consumed (from both flow and upkeep) is
$$\sum{P}=\frac{8\mu}{\pi}\frac{lQ^2}{r^4}+\pi\lambda lr^2\text{.}$$
Minimizing this quantity depends on precisely which variables the organism is free to manipulate, but the minimum invariably occurs when the two terms are proportional to each other. In that minimal case, the proportionality determines a relationship between Q and r. Canceling common factors and taking a square root,

| $$Q\propto r^3\text{.}$$ | 1 |

That is, when using as little energy as possible, the mass flowing through the pipe must be proportional to the cube of the pipe's radius. Since flow is leakless, the total flow rate into a junction must be the total flow rate out:
$$\sum_{\text{in}}{Q}=\sum_{\text{out}}{Q}\text{.}$$
Substituting (1) then gives Murray's law with α=3. This characteristic exponent also holds for laminar flow of non-Newtonian fluid models, such as power-law, Bingham and Herschel-Bulkley fluids.

For the limit of high Reynolds number turbulent flow, transport resistance is minimized when α=7/3 in
$$Q \propto r^\alpha.$$
Depending on the fluid type, the channel wall roughness and the Reynolds number of the flow in the network, the characteristic exponent α decreases from 3 towards 7/3 with increasing Reynolds number.

== Exponents for other networks ==
If the network does not rely on transported material getting "swept up in the flow", but instead expects it to passively diffuse, then resistance to transport is minimized when α=2: that is,
$$\sum_\text{in}{r^2}=\sum_\text{out}{r^2}\text{.}$$
The same law would apply to a direct-current electrical grid composed of wires of only one material, but varying diameter.

In general, networks intermediate between diffusion and laminar flow are expected to have characteristic exponents between 2 and 3, at least approximately.

== Experimental tests ==
Murray's law has been verified in chicks; dog intestines and lungs; cat mesentery; mouse and human lungs, and human intestines and lung capillaries. Mice genetically engineered to lack the blood-vessel-wall protein elastin have smaller and thinner blood vessels, but still obey Murray's law.

In humans, large vessels, such as the aorta or trachea, do not appear to obey Murray's law, instead obeying a Murray's law with exponent close to 2. But flow in those vessels is also partially turbulent, and so should exhibit an exponent nearer to 7/3 than to 3.

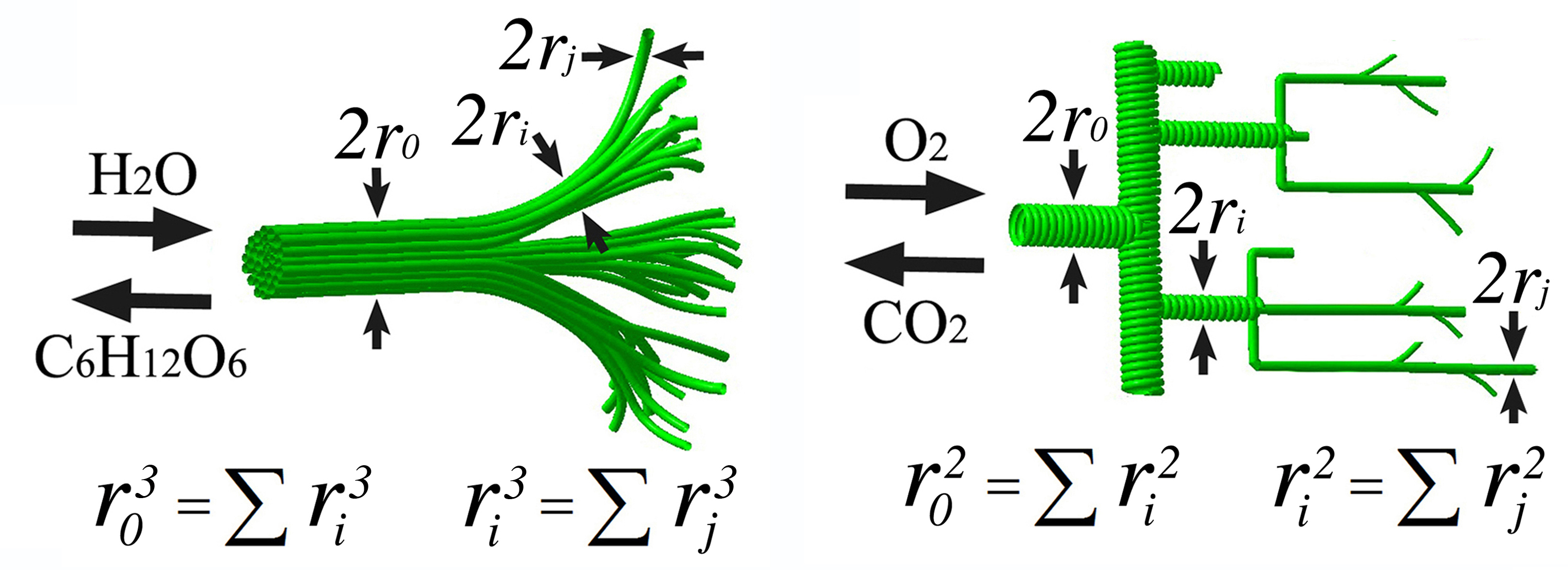
The Murray law in plants and insects.

Insects do not have a fully-fledged circulatory system, instead relying on passive diffusion through the haemocoel. For those networks, Murray's law predicts constant cross-sectional area, which is observed.

The same arguments that imply Murray's law also imply that the distribution of tubules should exhibit a specific power law scaling with size. Plant xylem is known to exhibit that scaling except in scenarios where the passages double as structural supports.

== History ==
The first phenomenon now recognized as Murray's law is Young's rule for circulatory systems, which states that two identical subcapillaries should combine to form a capillary with radius about 1.26≈^{3}√2 times larger, and dates to the early 19th century. Bryn Mawr physiologist Cecil D. Murray published the law's modern, general formulation in 1926, but it languished in a disciplinary no-man's-land for the next fifty years: too trivial for physicists and too complicated for biologists. Interest in the law revived in the 1970s.

== Applications ==
In circulatory system governed by Murray's law with α=3, shear stress on vessel walls is roughly constant. Consequently, variations in shear stress are a sign of deviation from Murray's law; Rodbard and Zamir suggest that such variations stimulate homeostatic growth or contraction.

Murray's law rarely applies to engineered materials, because man-made transport routes attempt to reduce flow resistance by minimizing branching and maximizing diameter.

=== Murray materials ===
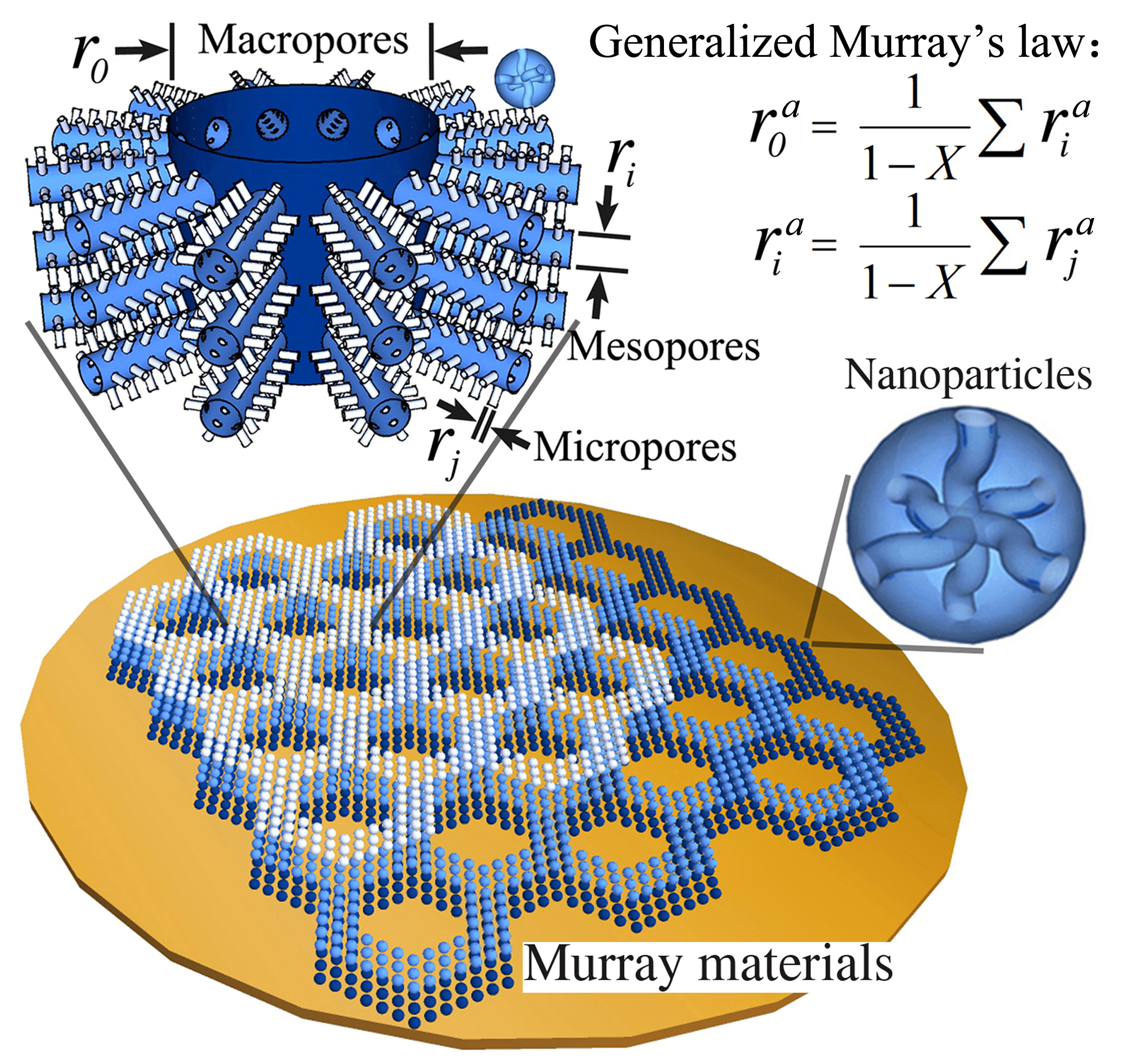
Zheng achieved Murray fractal branching through layering porous zinc oxide nanoparticle sheets.

Materials that obey Murray's law at the microscale, known as Murray materials, are expected to have favorable flow characteristics, but their construction is difficult, because it requires tight control over pore size typically over a wide range of scales.

Lim et al propose designing microfluidic "labs on a chip" in accord with Murray's law to minimize flow resistance during analysis. Conventional lithography does not support such construction, because it cannot produce channels of varying depth.

Seeking long-lived lithium battery electrodes, Zheng et al constructed Murray materials out of layers of sintered zinc oxide nanoparticles. The evaporation rate of the dissolved zinc oxide solvent controlled the size of the pores in each layer; the network was then just layers of ZnO with different pore sizes placed atop each other.

Because power plant working fluids typically funnel into many small tubules for efficient heat transfer, Murray's law may be appropriate for nuclear reactor design.
