= David Mayer de Rothschild =

British environmentalist and film producer (born 1978)

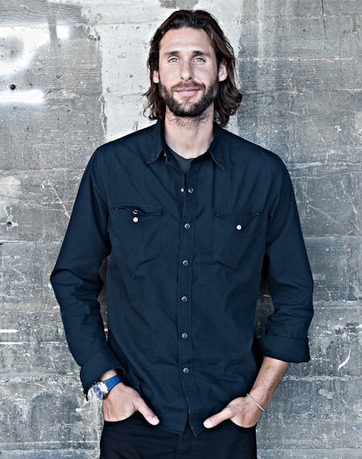
- Rothschild before 2014
- Born: 25 August 1978 (age 48); London, England
- Education: Oxford Brookes University (BSc)
- Father: Evelyn Robert de Rothschild
- Relatives: Anthony James de Rothschild (brother)
- Family: Rothschild family; Rothschild banking family of England
- Website: Sculpt the Future Foundation

David Mayer de Rothschild (born 25 August 1978) is a British environmentalist, film producer and a member of the Rothschild family.

== Early life ==
Rothschild is the youngest of three children of Victoria Lou Schott and Sir Evelyn de Rothschild of the Rothschild banking family of England. His middle name "Mayer" is taken from the name of the founder of the Rothschild family banking empire, Mayer Amschel Rothschild. The youngest heir to his family's banking fortune, Rothschild was born in 1978 in London, England. His mother was American, the daughter of Marcia Lou (née Whitney) and real estate developer Lewis M. Schott. He is the younger brother of Anthony de Rothschild and Jessica de Rothschild. As a teenager, Rothschild was a top-ranked horse jumper on Britain's junior event team. He later gave up the sport to pursue his education, stating in an interview with The New Yorker "I realized there was more to life than spending hours and hours and hours on a horse." After leaving Harrow School in 1996 he attended Oxford Brookes receiving a 2:1 B.Sc (Hons) in Political Science and Information Systems. In 2002, Rothschild studied at the College of Naturopathic Medicine, London where he received an advanced Diploma in Natural Medicine, ND.

By age 20, Rothschild had started his own music merchandising business and sold it. In 2001 he bought a 450-hectare (1,100-acre) organic farm in New Zealand, and was invited to take part in a Polar expedition. This experience turned Rothschild into an enterprising eco-adventurer.

== Exploration ==
=== Polar expeditions ===
In 2006, Rothschild spent over 100 days crossing the Arctic from Russia to Canada, which saw him become one of only 42 people, and the youngest British person, to ever reach both geographical poles. He had already become one of only 14 people ever to traverse the continent of Antarctica, and was part of a team that broke the world record for the fastest ever crossing of the Greenland ice cap. In 2006 he launched the website "Mission Control" in order to present his expeditions and environmental efforts to children and the youth. The trek across the Arctic was the first "mission" to be highlighted on the website, and the second was planned to either be a trek through the Amazon or a trek from Lake Baikal to the Gobi Desert.

His expeditions also led to his founding of the Adventure Ecology organization. It serves as a community and network for the discussion of climate change and associated problems. In 2018, he undertook an expedition across the Pacific Ocean. The goal of this journey was to raise awareness about the impact of global warming and to promote the protection of marine ecosystems. They focused on the fight against ocean pollution caused by plastic waste, aiming to educate coastal communities and society at large about the importance of preserving our seas.

=== Plastiki ===
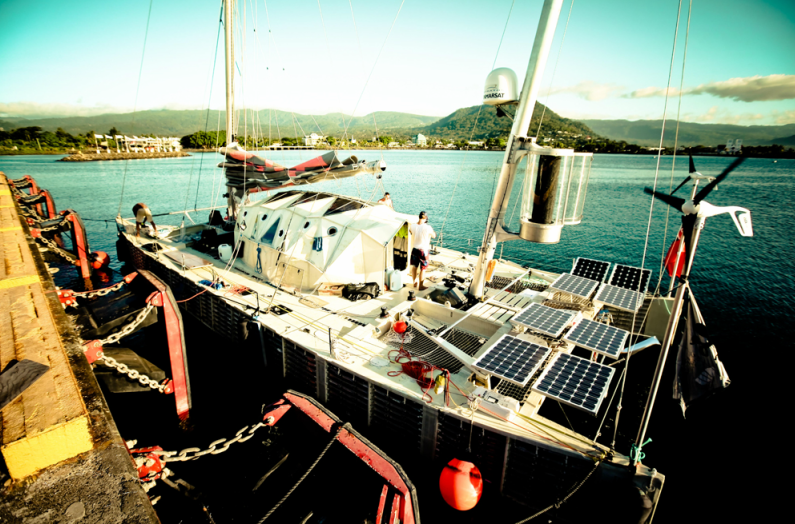
The Plastiki before its maiden voyage

In the late 2000s, Rothschild developed a mission to raise awareness of the Pacific Garbage Patch, in which he invented a new form of sustainable ship at a lab on Pier 31 in San Francisco, called the Plastiki. In March 2010, de Rothschild launched the boat, a 60-foot (18 m) catamaran built from approximately 12,500 reclaimed plastic bottles and a unique recyclable technology called Seretex. Seretex, which was developed by de Rothschild and his team, was meant to reuse PET in a novel way, finding new uses for a waste product. The Plastiki and its crew sailed over 8,000 nautical miles (15,000 km; 9,200 mi) across the Pacific Ocean from San Francisco to Sydney.

The evening before their journey began, Rothschild and his skipper Jo Royle interviewed with CNN, quoting Mark Twain when asked how he felt in anticipation for the trip.

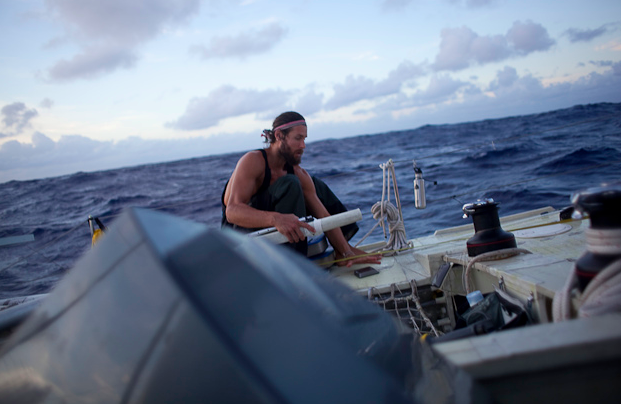
David de Rothschild on the Plastiki

The Plastiki successfully completed its journey to Sydney on 26 July 2010. Along with the Plastiki, Rothschild launched a platform for community interaction and sharing stories called "Myoo" (the name comes from the pronunciation of "community"). The Plastiki was named one of 2010's fifty best inventions by Time magazine. The Plastiki is named after the Kon-Tiki, a raft used by Pacific explorer Thor Heyerdahl.

The construction of the ship is notable not only for its use of recycled plastic bottles as a primary building material, but also for using reclaimed and environmentally friendly materials throughout. In April 2010, Mayer told Good Morning America: "Every part of the boat, even down to the glue we used to stick the boat together, [it] is a glue we made and had to engineer specifically for this project. It's made of cashew nuts and sugar....every part of the boat – from the interior with reclaimed materials, reclaimed fabric, is all trying to do our best and showcasing there are a lot of solutions out there."

In 2009, New Yorker correspondent John Colapinto wrote about the Plastiki, comparing its creator, Rothschild, to adventurers such as Sir Richard Francis Burton and Sebastian Snow.

=== ARTiculate expeditions ===
As part of Adventure Ecology's ARTiculate series, de Rothschild led a field trip expedition to the Ecuadorian Amazon in 2007. The group spent time in the Ecuadorian rain forest, documenting the damage international oil companies had caused by drilling the vast oil reserves. In November 2011, de Rothschild and a small crew mounted an expedition to Brazil's Amazon rainforest as part of the ARTiculate series, with the goal of better understanding and publicizing the effects of the controversial Belo Monte dam project. This expedition was supplemented by articles on Myoo.com and culminated in an art project developed with local children.

When asked by Outside Magazine reporter Caty Enders about whether an expedition could make a difference in a pressing issue like the Belo Monte dam de Rothschild replied that "it would be naïve to think that this mini art-based adventure into the Amazon is going to change what has been in motion for the last 36 years. But when you see someone in the road and they're dying, do you keep walking and say, Oh, they'll be dead soon? That's the reality when you embark on an adventure like this, you may never know the true outcome until many years later".

== Organizations ==
The Myoo concept developed into the Myoo Agency, founded by de Rothschild as a marketing agency that works with businesses looking to create sustainable practices. The Plastiki development was done under the company name Smarter Plan, which continues to develop additional solutions for adapting waste into useful objects and devices. Myoo was eventually renamed the World-Exposure agency, reflecting his new partnership with the Exposure marketing agency. It carries on the task of introducing firms to sustainable practices and promoting communications strategies involving sustainable means and profiling sustainable enterprises. A precursor to Myoo was de Rothschild's previous organization Adventure Ecology, the mission of which has been absorbed into World-Exposure.

De Rothschild is also the founder of the environmental foundation Sculpt the Future. Sculpt the Future took the initiative of spreading environmental education through the use of adventure ecology and other high-profile methods. According to The Today Show, the foundation "encourages people to find new ways to change and improve their communities and environment". De Rothschild also founded Mpact, which focuses on teaching corporations and organizations on how to access the most zealous community contributors and volunteers, and how to provide them with the tools they need to succeed on their behalf.

== Media ==
=== Written work ===
In 2007, de Rothschild wrote The Live Earth Global Warming Survival Handbook: 77 Essential Skills to Stop Climate Change—Or Live Through It (ISBN 978-1-59486-781-1), with afterword by Kevin Wall, which was the official companion book to the Live Earth concert series. In 2008, he was the Consultant Editor for Earth Matters: An Encyclopedia of Ecology, wrote an action graphic novel, The Boy, The Girl, The Tree with artist Simon Harrison and wrote the foreword to True Green Kids: 100 Things You Can Do to Save the Planet.

In 2007, alongside others including Zac Goldsmith, the Baron Goldsmith of Richmond Park (David Cameron's environmental advisor), de Rothschild contributed to Sebastian Copeland's book Antarctica – The Global Warning. De Rothschild is a Huffington Post contributor, commenting on environmental issues. In early 2010, he also trademarked the phrase Equation For Curiosity.

=== Film work ===
In 2009, de Rothschild produced Playground, a documentary focusing on the child sex trade in the United States.

In 2012, de Rothschild developed Eco Trip: The Real Cost of Living, an eight part series on the production methods behind household items and the impact their use has on the environment. Each episode covers the full life cycle of the products.

In 2017, he produced Becoming Bond, a docudrama exploring the casting of Australian actor George Lazenby as James Bond in the film On Her Majesty's Secret Service.

== Business ==
In 2016, de Rothschild launched an ecology-oriented lifestyle brand, Lost Explorer.

== Recognition ==
David de Rothschild was awarded the accolade of "Emerging Explorer" by National Geographic, appointed an "international ambassador" by NGO Clean Up the World, and nominated as a "Young Global Leader" by the World Economic Forum.

In 2007, de Rothschild was named one of GQ Magazine's men of the year, being the sole individual named to the "Environmentalist" category. The following year, due to his efforts at involving youth in environmental issues, he was the 2008 winner of the Kids' Choice Awards UK "Greenie Award".

In 2009, Rothschild was named by the United Nations Environment Program as a "Climate Hero". In 2011, de Rothschild served on the judging panel for the International Green Awards as well as the Climate Week Awards. In 2011, he also received the Honorary Award of The National German Sustainability Award.
