= Sam Cooke =

American singer and songwriter (1931–1964)

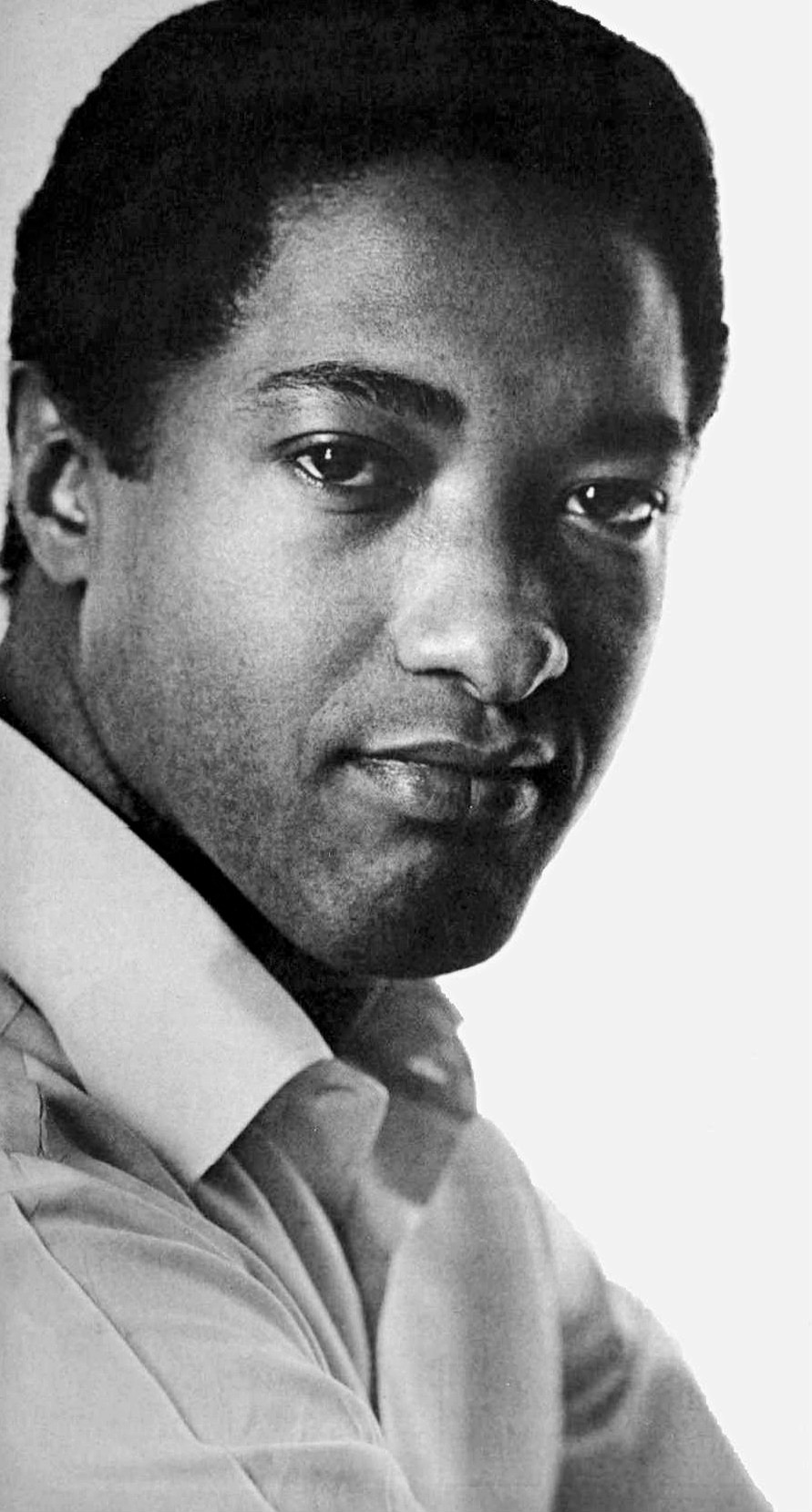
- Cooke in 1963

Background information
- Born: Samuel Cook; January 22, 1931; Clarksdale, Mississippi, U.S.
- Origin: Chicago, Illinois, U.S.
- Died: December 11, 1964 (aged 33) Los Angeles, California, U.S.
- Genres: Soul; R&B; gospel
- Occupations: Singer; songwriter
- Years active: 1951–1964
- Labels: ABKCO; Specialty; Keen; RCA Victor

Samuel Cooke (né Cook; January 22, 1931 – December 11, 1964) was an American soul singer and songwriter. Considered one of the most influential soul artists of all time, Cooke is commonly referred to as the "King of Soul" for his distinctive vocals, pioneering contributions to the genre, and significance in popular music.

During his thirteen-year career, Cooke released 29 singles that charted in the Top 40 of the Billboard Hot 100 chart, as well as 20 singles in the Top 10 of Billboard's Black Singles chart. In 2015, Cooke was ranked number 28 in Billboard magazine's list of the "35 Greatest R&B Artists of All Time" and number 3 in Rolling Stone magazine's list of the "200 Greatest Singers of All Time", behind only Whitney Houston (number 2) and Aretha Franklin (number 1).

In 1964, he was shot and killed by the manager of a motel in Los Angeles. After an inquest and investigation, the courts ruled Cooke's death to be a justifiable homicide. His family has since questioned the circumstances of his death.

== Early life ==
Sam Cooke was born Samuel Cook in Clarksdale, Mississippi, in 1931 (he added the "e" to his last name in 1958 to signify a new start to his life). He was the fifth of eight children of Rev. Charles Cook, a Baptist minister, and the former Annie Mae Carroll. One of his younger brothers, L.C. (1932–2017), later became a member of the doo-wop band Johnny Keyes and the Magnificents. Cooke was raised Baptist.

Cooke's family moved to Chicago in 1933. There, he attended Doolittle Elementary and Wendell Phillips Academy High School, the same school that Nat King Cole had attended a few years earlier. Cooke sang in the choir of his father's church and began his career with his siblings in a group called the Singing Children when he was six years old. Cooke first became known as lead singer with the Highway Q.C.'s when he was a teenager, having joined the group at the age of 14. During this time, Cooke befriended fellow gospel singer and neighbor Lou Rawls, who sang in a rival gospel group.

== Career ==
=== The Soul Stirrers ===
In 1950, Cooke replaced gospel tenor R. H. Harris as lead singer of his gospel group The Soul Stirrers, who had signed with Specialty Records on behalf of the group.

Their first recording under Cooke's leadership was the song "Jesus Gave Me Water" in 1950. They also recorded the gospel songs "Peace in the Valley", "How Far Am I from Canaan?", "Jesus Paid the Debt" and "One More River", among many others, some of which he wrote.

Cooke was often credited with bringing gospel music to the attention of a younger crowd of listeners, mainly girls who would rush to the stage when the Soul Stirrers hit the stage just to get a glimpse of him.

Cooke formally left the Soul Stirrers in 1956 after deciding to pursue a secular career as a solo artist, prompting a backlash from the gospel community and religious leaders.

=== Early solo success ===
Prior to leaving the Soul Stirrers in 1956, Cooke recorded his first secular pop song, "Lovable", a remake of the gospel song "Wonderful", under the alias Dale Cook, in hopes of not getting discovered recording secular material because of the stigma against gospel singers performing pop music, which failed due to Cooke's instantly recognizable voice.

Art Rupe, head of Specialty Records, the label of the Soul Stirrers, gave his blessing for Cooke to record secular music under his real name, but he was unhappy about the type of music Cooke and producer Bumps Blackwell were making. Rupe expected Cooke's secular music to be similar to that of another Specialty Records artist, Little Richard. When Rupe walked in on a recording session and heard Cooke singing Gershwin, he was quite upset. After an argument between Rupe and Blackwell, Cooke and Blackwell left the label.

"Lovable" was neither a hit nor a flop, but it indicated Cooke's future potential. While gospel was popular, Cooke saw that its fans were mostly limited to low-income, rural parts of the country, and he sought to branch out. Cooke later admitted that he got an endorsement for a career in pop music from the least likely man, his pastor father. Cooke stated: "My father told me it was not what I sang that was important, but that God gave me a voice and musical talent and the true use of His gift was to share it and make people happy."

Upon branching into his solo career, Cooke added the e to his last name. In 1957, Cooke signed with Keen Records and released his first single, "You Send Me", which included the song ""Summertime" as its B-side. The song topped the Billboard R&B Best Sellers and Jockeys charts for six weeks between November 25 and December 30, 1957. On December 7, 1957, the song began a three-week tenure at number one on the Billboard Top 100. It elevated him from earning $200 a week to over $5,000 a week (equivalent to $57,000 in 2025). Cooke appeared on ABC's The Guy Mitchell Show and on November 3 of that year, Cooke made his first appearance performing on the Ed Sullivan Show, which became controversial when the live broadcast ran over time and the screen went black. Outraged viewers flooded the network with complaints, leading Ed Sullivan to re-book Cooke for December 1.

Specialty Records, wanting to take advantage of their former artist's commercial success, released the Cooke song, "I'll Come Running Back to You", which peaked at number seven on the R&B Best Sellers chart and topped the R&B Jockeys chart in January 1958. It peaked at number 18 on the Pop Best-Sellers chart the following month. Keen Records soon released Cooke's rendition of "I Love You (For Sentimental Reasons)", which reached the top 20 on both the pop and R&B charts. Other early hits released during this era included "You Were Made for Me", "Lonely Island", "Everybody Loves to Cha Cha Cha" and "Only Sixteen".

Still a relatively new artist, Cooke wanted to branch further from the Chitlin' Circuit and in March 1958, just months after "You Send Me" topped the charts, Cooke booked two weeks at the Copacabana. However, Cooke later said he "bombed" during the residency with many in the audience not being familiar with the singer. Later that year, Cooke performed for the famed Cavalcade of Jazz concert produced by Leon Hefflin held at the Shrine Auditorium on August 3. The other headliners were Little Willie John, Ray Charles, Ernie Freeman, and Bo Rhambo. Sammy Davis Jr. was there to crown the winner of the Miss Cavalcade of Jazz beauty contest. The event featured the top four prominent disc jockeys of Los Angeles. By 1959, Cooke sought a new label and wanted to produce his own music, breaking away from Bumps Blackwell after a three-year partnership.

=== Mainstream success ===
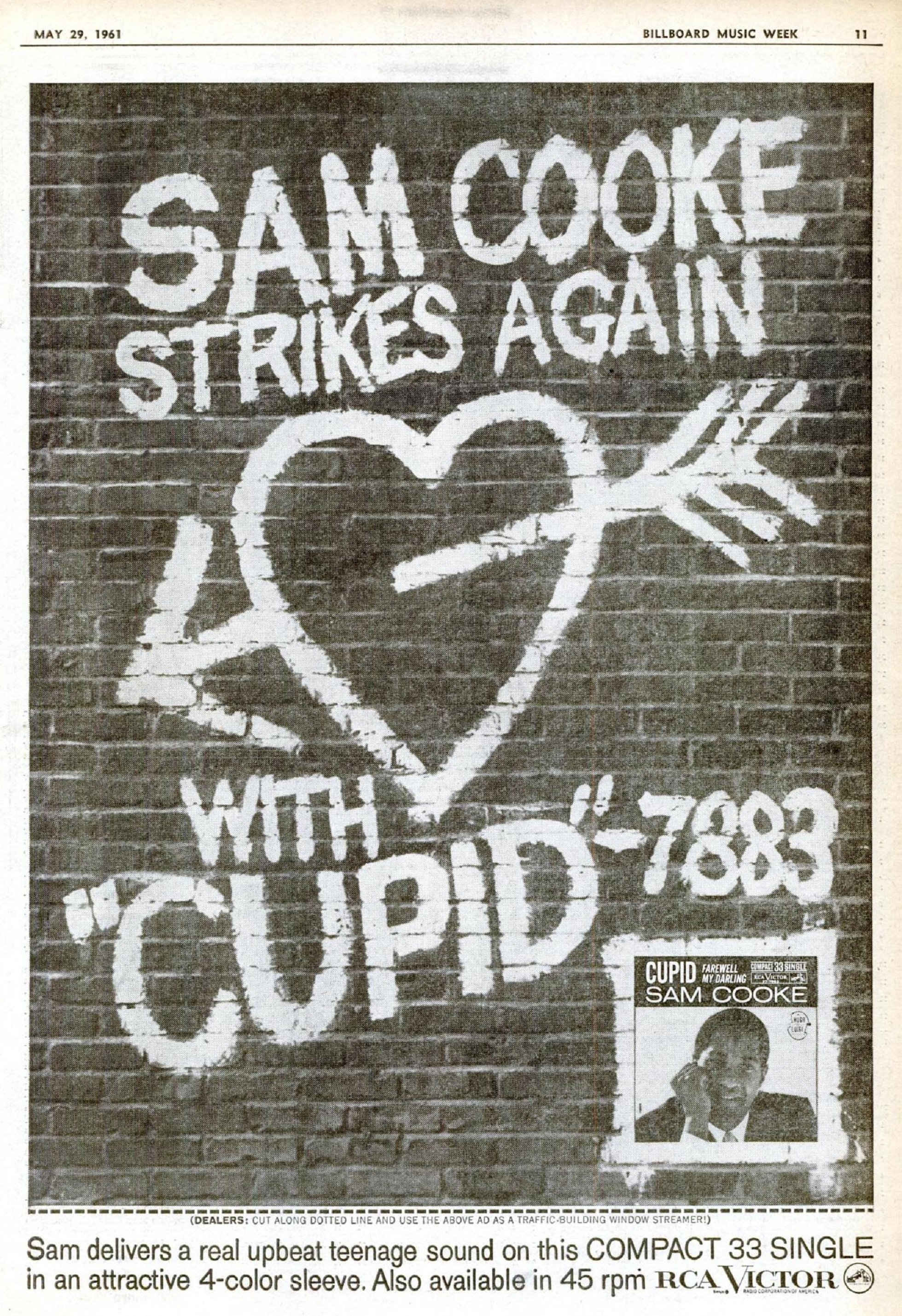
Billboard advertisement, May 29, 1961

In January 1960, Cooke signed a lucrative deal with RCA Victor, having been offered an advance of $100,000 (equivalent to $1.1 million in 2025) by the label's producers Hugo & Luigi.

After his first RCA single, "Teenage Sonata", became a relative flop, Keen Records issued the Cooke-produced and co-written "Wonderful World", which reached number 12 on the Billboard Hot 100 and number two on the Hot R&B Sides chart, which changed Cooke's musical direction. Soon after, Cooke released the song "Chain Gang", which peaked at number two on both the Billboard Hot 100 and Hot R&B Sides charts and became his first UK top ten hit. Following this success, Cooke recorded several more hits such as "Cupid", "Twistin' the Night Away", "Bring It On Home to Me" (which featured Lou Rawls in the background), "Having a Party", "Nothing Can Change This Love", "Send Me Some Lovin'" and "Another Saturday Night". Cooke's 1962 album, Twistin' the Night Away, became one of his best selling albums.

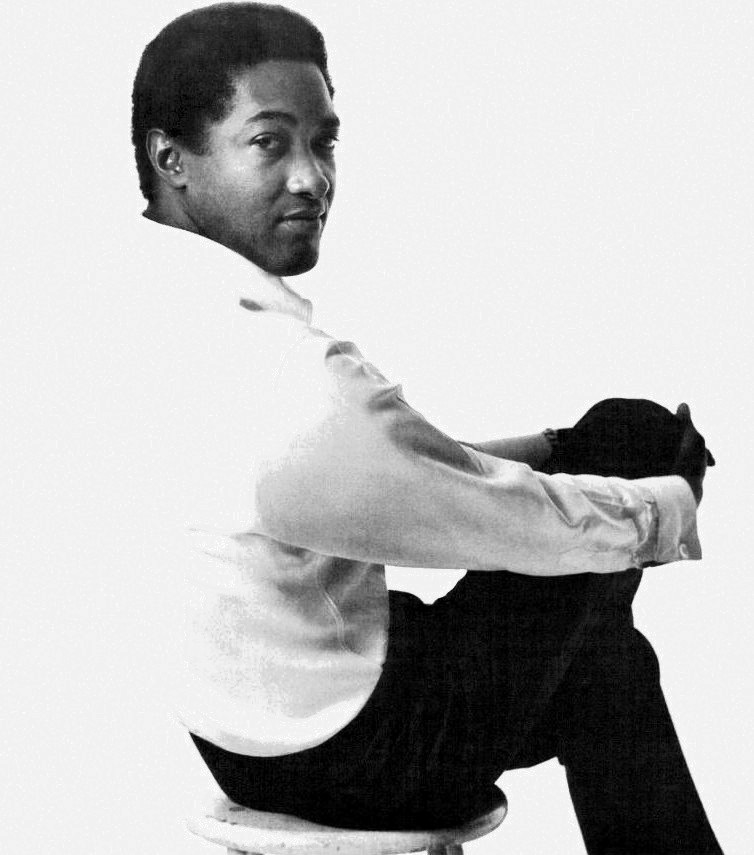
Cooke in Billboard, 1965, released posthumously

During this period, Cooke launched his own record label SAR Records with J. W. Alexander and his manager, Roy Crain. The label soon included the Simms Twins, the Valentinos (who were Bobby Womack and his brothers), Mel Carter and Johnnie Taylor. Cooke then created a publishing imprint and management firm named Kags, which made Cooke among the first modern Black performers and composers to attend to the business side of his musical career.

Like most R&B artists of his time, Cooke focused on singles. Cooke was a prolific songwriter and wrote most of the songs he recorded. Cooke also had a hand in overseeing some of the song arrangements. In spite of releasing mostly singles, he released a well-received blues-inflected LP in 1963, Night Beat, and his most critically acclaimed studio album, Ain't That Good News, which featured five singles, in 1964. In 1963, Cooke signed a five-year contract for Allen Klein to manage Kags Music and SAR Records, and made him his manager. Klein negotiated a five-year deal (three years plus two option years) with RCA Victor in which a holding company, Tracey, Ltd, named after Cooke's daughter, owned by Klein and managed by J. W. Alexander, would produce and own Cooke's recordings. RCA Victor would get exclusive distribution rights in exchange for six percent royalty payments and payments for the recording sessions.

For tax reasons, Cooke would receive preferred stock in Tracey instead of an initial cash advance of $100,000. He would receive cash advances of $100,000 for the next two years, followed by an additional $75,000 for each of the two option years if the deal went to term.

In July 1964, Cooke returned to the Copacabana, with his performances there becoming a success due to Cooke now being a more experienced and successful artist. As a result, RCA Victor recorded a live album of one of his Copacabana performances and later released it under the album, Sam Cooke at the Copa, which became one of the first number one albums on the R&B Albums chart.

== Vocal ability ==
Cooke was known for his tenor voice, which was big, velvety, and expansive, with a recognizable tone. Cooke could go as high as high C without losing purity or volume, and his upper mid-range was coated in a unique rasp. Cooke's vocal style was very adaptable, adopting a rather classical sound on jazz and pop songs while maintaining his trademark stylistic soulful hold on R&B, gospel and soul music.

Cooke's delivery encompassed a wide range of emotions including playful expressiveness to interact with listeners, mellow somberness as a form of reflection, and (in "A Change Is Gonna Come") profound soulfulness. When performing live, he would often play with notes and scales and experiment with melodies and his enunciation, while improvising entire songs. Cooke also began to perform highly charged versions of his songs later in his career.

Cooke's vocal exploits would go on to influence many acts like Otis Redding, James Brown, Rod Stewart, Johnny Nash, Tina Turner, Wilson Pickett, Mick Jagger, Al Green, Paul McCartney, Diana Ross, Marvin Gaye, Steve Perry, and Stevie Wonder among many others.

== Personal life ==
Cooke was married twice. His first marriage was to singer-dancer Dolores Elizabeth Milligan Cooke, who took the stage name "Dee Dee Mohawk" in 1953; they divorced in 1958. She was killed in an auto collision in Fresno, California, in 1959. Although Cooke and Milligan were divorced, he paid for his ex-wife's funeral expenses.

In 1958, Cooke married his second wife, Barbara Campbell (1935–2021), in Chicago. His father performed the ceremony. They had three children: Linda (b. 1953), Tracy (b. 1960), and Vincent (1961–1963), who drowned in the family swimming pool. Cooke also fathered at least three other children out of wedlock. In 1958, a woman in Philadelphia, Connie Bolling, said Cooke was the father of her son. Cooke paid her an estimated $5,000 settlement out of court.

In November 1958, Cooke was involved in a car crash en route from St. Louis to Greenville, Mississippi. His chauffeur Edward Cunningham was killed, while Cooke, guitarist Cliff White, and singer Lou Rawls were hospitalized.

Cooke was a central part of the civil rights movement, using his influence and popularity with the White and Black populations to fight for the cause. Cooke was friends with boxer Muhammad Ali, activist Malcolm X and football player Jim Brown, who together campaigned for racial equality.

== Death ==
Cooke was shot and killed on December 11, 1964, at the Hacienda Motel at 91st and South Figueroa streets in South Central Los Angeles. Answering separate reports of a shooting and a kidnapping at the motel, police found Cooke's body. He had sustained a gunshot wound to the chest, which was later determined to have pierced his heart.

The motel's manager, Bertha Franklin, said she shot Cooke in self-defense. Her account was immediately disputed by Cooke's friends, who were not there at the time of the incident. The motel's owner, Evelyn Carr, (Note: Some sources identify the motel owner's last name as "Card," according to Guralnick) said that she had been on the telephone with Franklin at the time of the incident. Carr said she overheard Cooke's intrusion and the ensuing conflict and gunshot, and called the police.

The police record states that Franklin fatally shot Cooke, who had checked in earlier that evening. Franklin said Cooke had banged on the door of her office, shouting "Where's the girl?!" in reference to Elisa Boyer, a woman who had accompanied Cooke to the motel and who had called the police that night from a telephone booth near the motel minutes before Carr had.

Franklin shouted back that there was no one in her office except herself, but an enraged Cooke did not believe her and forced his way into the office, naked except for one shoe and a sport jacket. He grabbed her, demanding again to know the woman's whereabouts. According to Franklin, she grappled with Cooke, the two of them fell to the floor, and she then got up and ran to retrieve a gun. Franklin said that she then fired at Cooke in self-defense because she feared for her life. He was struck once in the torso. According to Franklin, Cooke exclaimed, "Lady, you shot me", in a tone that expressed perplexity rather than anger, before advancing on her again. Franklin said she hit him on the head with a broomstick before Cooke finally fell to the floor and died. A coroner's inquest was convened to investigate the incident.

Boyer told the police that she had first met Cooke earlier that night and had spent the evening in his company. Boyer said that after they left a local nightclub together, she had repeatedly requested that he take her home, but it appeared Cooke was intoxicated and drove her against her will to a place to have sex. As they sped down Harbor Freeway, Boyer noted they had passed a number of hotels and motor courts.

Cooke ended up at the Hacienda Motel, a black-owned business in south central Los Angeles. Boyer noted Cooke's familiarity with the layout as if he had been a repeat customer. She said that once in one of the motel's rooms, Cooke physically forced her onto the bed, and then stripped Boyer to her panties. She said she was sure he was going to rape her. Cooke allowed her to use the bathroom, from which she attempted an escape but found that the window was firmly shut. According to Boyer, she returned to the main room, where Cooke continued to molest her. When he went to use the bathroom, Boyer quickly grabbed her clothes and ran from the room. She said that in her haste, she had also scooped up most of Cooke's clothing by mistake.

Boyer said she ran first to the manager's office and knocked on the door seeking help. However, she said that the manager took too long to respond, so, fearing Cooke would soon be coming after her, she fled from the motel before the manager opened the door. Boyer said she then put her clothes back on, hid Cooke's clothing, went to a telephone booth, and called the police.

According to restaurant employees and friends, Cooke was carrying a large amount of money at Martoni's. A search of Boyer's purse by police revealed only a $20 bill, and a search of Cooke's Ferrari found a money clip with $108 (equivalent to $1,121 in 2025), plus a few loose coins near the ashtray.

As Carr's testimony corroborated Franklin's version of events, and because both Boyer and Franklin later passed polygraph tests, the coroner's jury ultimately accepted Franklin's explanation and returned a verdict of justifiable homicide. With that verdict, authorities officially closed the case on Cooke's death.

However, some of Cooke's family and supporters have rejected Boyer's version of events, as well as those given by Franklin and Carr. They believe that the killing took place in some manner entirely different from the three official accounts.

On the perceived lack of an investigation, Cooke's close friend Muhammad Ali said: "If Cooke had been Frank Sinatra, the Beatles or Ricky Nelson, the FBI would be investigating."

Singer Etta James viewed Cooke's body before his funeral and questioned the accuracy of the official version of events. She wrote that the injuries she observed were well beyond the official account of Cooke having fought Franklin alone. James wrote that Cooke was so badly beaten that his head was nearly separated from his shoulders, his hands were broken and crushed, and his nose was mangled.

Some have speculated that Cooke's manager, Allen Klein, had a role in his death. Klein owned Tracey Ltd, which ultimately owned all rights to Cooke's recordings. However, no evidence supporting a criminal conspiracy has been presented.

=== Aftermath ===
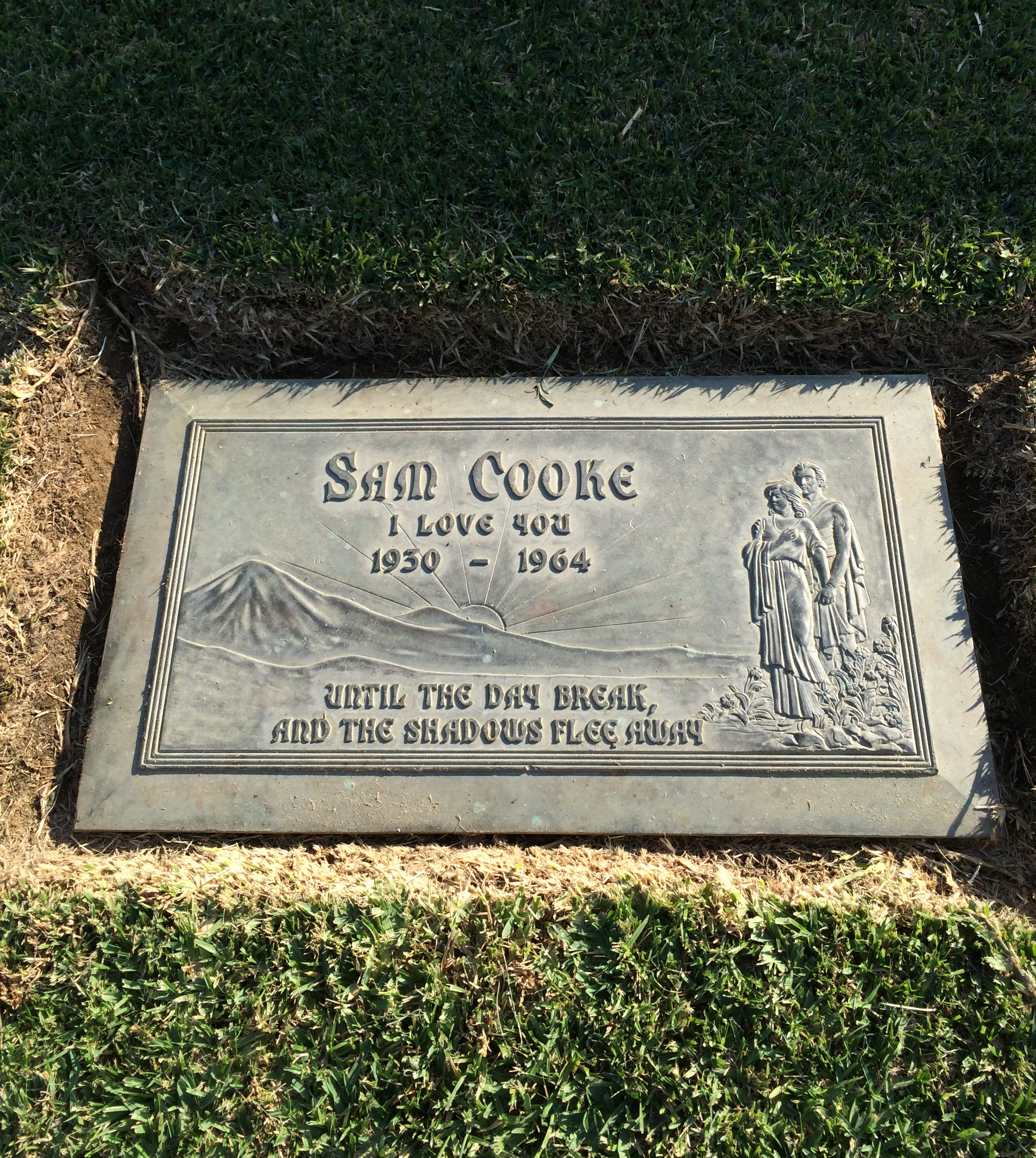
Grave of Sam Cooke in the Garden of Honor at Forest Lawn Memorial Park in Glendale, California

The first funeral service for Cooke was held on December 18, 1964, at A. R. Leak Funeral Home in Chicago; 200,000 fans lined up for more than four city blocks to view his body.

Afterward, Cooke's body was flown back to Los Angeles for a second service, at the Mount Sinai Baptist Church on December 19, which included a much-heralded performance of "The Angels Keep Watching Over Me" by Ray Charles, who stood in for a grief-stricken Bessie Griffin. Cooke was interred at Forest Lawn Memorial Park Cemetery in Glendale, California.

Two singles and an album were released in the month after Cooke's death. One of the singles, "Shake", reached the top ten of both the pop and R&B charts. The B-side, "A Change Is Gonna Come", is considered a classic protest song from the era of the civil rights movement. It was a Top 40 pop hit and a top 10 R&B hit. The album, also titled Shake, reached the number one spot for R&B albums.

Bertha Franklin said that she received numerous death threats after shooting Cooke. She left her position at the Hacienda Motel and did not publicly disclose where she had moved. After being cleared by the coroner's jury, she sued Cooke's estate, citing physical injuries and mental anguish suffered as a result of Cooke's ostensible attack. Franklin's lawsuit sought $200,000 (equivalent to $2 million in 2025) of compensatory and punitive damages.

Barbara Womack countersued Franklin on behalf of the estate, seeking $7,000 (equivalent to $72,000 in 2025) in damages to cover Cooke's funeral expenses. Elisa Boyer provided testimony in support of Franklin in the case. In 1967, the courts awarded Franklin $30,000 in damages (equivalent to $290,000 in 2025).

== Legacy ==
Cooke's contribution to soul music contributed to the rise of Aretha Franklin, Bobby Womack, Al Green, Curtis Mayfield, Stevie Wonder, Marvin Gaye, and Billy Preston, and popularized the work of Otis Redding and James Brown. AllMusic biographer Bruce Eder wrote that Cooke was "the inventor of soul music", and possessed "an incredible natural singing voice and a smooth, effortless delivery that has never been surpassed."

=== Portrayals ===
Cooke was portrayed by Paul Mooney in The Buddy Holly Story, a 1978 American biographical film which tells the life story of rock musician Buddy Holly.

In the stage play One Night in Miami, first performed in 2013, Cooke was portrayed by Arinzé Kene. In the 2020 film adaptation, he is played by Leslie Odom Jr., who was nominated for the Academy Award for Best Supporting Actor for his portrayal.

=== Posthumous honors ===
- In 1986, Cooke was inducted as a charter member of the Rock and Roll Hall of Fame.
- In 1987, Cooke was inducted into the Songwriters Hall of Fame.
- In 1989, Cooke was inducted a second time to the Rock and Roll Hall of Fame when the Soul Stirrers were inducted.
- On February 1, 1994, Cooke received a star on the Hollywood Walk of Fame for his contributions to the music industry, located on 7051 Hollywood Boulevard.
- Although Cooke never won a Grammy Award, he received the Grammy Lifetime Achievement Award in 1999, presented by Larry Blackmon of funk super-group Cameo.
- In 2004, Rolling Stone ranked Cooke 16th on its list of the "100 Greatest Artists of All Time".
- In 2008, Cooke was named the fourth "Greatest Singer of All Time" by Rolling Stone.
- In 2008, Cooke received the first plaque on the Clarksdale Walk of Fame, located at the New Roxy Theater.
- In 2009, Cooke was honored with a marker on the Mississippi Blues Trail in Clarksdale.
- In June 2011, the city of Chicago renamed a portion of East 36th Street near Cottage Grove Avenue as the honorary "Sam Cooke Way" to remember the singer near a corner where he hung out and sang as a teenager. Many of his family were also in attendance, as many of them were living in the Chicago area.
- In 2013, Cooke was inducted into the National Rhythm and Blues Music Hall of Fame in Cleveland, Ohio, at Cleveland State University. The founder of the National Rhythm & Blues Hall of Fame, LaMont Robinson, said he was the greatest singer ever to sing.
- The words "A Change Is Gonna Come" from the Sam Cooke song of the same name are on a wall of the Contemplative Court, a space for reflection in the Smithsonian's National Museum of African American History and Culture; the museum opened in 2016.
- Cooke is inducted into the Mississippi Musicians Hall of Fame.
- In 2020, Dion released a song and music video as a tribute to Cooke called "Song for Sam Cooke (Here in America)" (featuring Paul Simon) from his album Blues with Friends. American Songwriter magazine honored "Song for Sam Cooke" as the "Greatest of the Great 2020 Songs".
- In 2023, Cooke was named the third "Greatest Singer of All Time" by Rolling Stone.
- In 2024, Elliot James Reay released a song "Boy in Love" in which he pays homage to Cooke with the lyrics "But, now, when Sam Cooke sings, she got me whistling along".
- In 2025, Rolling Stone placed "A Change Is Gonna Come" at number 1 on its list of "The 100 Best Protest Songs of All Time".

== Discography ==
- Sam Cooke (1958)
- Encore (1958)
- Tribute to the Lady (1959)
- Cooke's Tour (1960)
- Hits of the 50's (1960)
- Swing Low (1961)
- My Kind of Blues (1961)
- Twistin' the Night Away (1962)
- Mr. Soul (1963)
- Night Beat (1963)
- Ain't That Good News (1964)
