= Bernstorff =

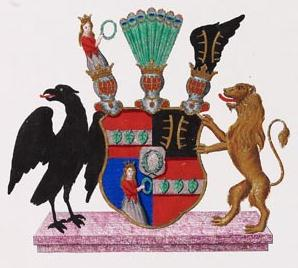
Arms of the counts of Bernstorff

The Bernstorff family is an old and distinguished German-Danish noble family which originated in Mecklenburg, Germany, dating back to 1300 with Johannes dictus de Bernardestorpe. Members of the family held the title of Count/Countess, granted to them on 14 December 1767 by King Christian VII of Denmark.

== Notable members ==
- Andreas Gottlieb von Bernstorff (1649–1726), Hanoverian minister who accompanied George I to Britain when he became King
- Johann Hartwig Ernst von Bernstorff (1712–1772), Danish statesman
- Andreas Peter Bernstorff (1735–1797), Danish state minister
- Christian Günther von Bernstorff (1769–1835), Danish and Prussian statesman
- Joachim Frederik von Bernstorff (1771–1835), Danish statesman
- Albrecht von Bernstorff (1809–1873), diplomat, Prussian Foreign Minister (1861–1862)
- Andreas von Bernstorff (1811–1864), Danish military officer
- Berthold von Bernstorff (1842–1917), German politician and owner of Schiermonnikoog
- Percy von Bernstorff (1858–1930), German public official
- Johann Heinrich von Bernstorff (1862–1939), German diplomat
- Georg Ernst von Bernstorff (1870–1939), German politician
- Albrecht von Bernstorff (1890–1945), German diplomat and resistance fighter

== See also ==
- Bernstorff Palace
- Bernstorff Fjord
- Bernstorff Glacier
