= Mosting =

Mosting, Møsting or Mösting may refer to:

People

- Johan Sigismund von Møsting
- Frederikke Louise Møsting, maid-of-honor of Caroline Matilda of Great Britain

Places

- Cape Møsting, Greenland
- Mösting (crater) in the moon
- Møstings Hus
