= Hanne Varming =

Danish sculptor and medallist (1939–2022)

Hanne Varming née Larsen (13 May 1939 – 30 October 2022) was a Danish sculptor and medallist. Her works include statues of celebrities such as Victor Borge but generally depict ordinary people or even her own children. Her portraits of Queen Margrethe II can be seen on the Danish 10 and 20 crown pieces. Her representation of an old couple sitting on a bench in Copenhagen's Kultorvet is inspired by Hans Christian Andersen's Hyldemoer or The Little Elder-Tree Mother.

== Biography ==
Born on 13 May 1939 in Copenhagen, Hanne Varming is the daughter of the registrar Viggo Larsen (1911–1997) and Inger Øllgaard (born 1914). In 1962, she married the sculptor Erik Varming (born 1942) with whom she had four children: Johan Ludvig (1964), Signe Marie (1965), Karen Margrethe (1969) and Hans Jacob (1972). The marriage was dissolved in 1986. In 1994, she married Ove Højgaard Andersen.

She was raised in Hellerup where she attended Tranegård School. As a result of dyslexia, she had difficulty reading but had shown interest in drawing and creating figures with plasticine from an early age. After she left school in 1955, her parents thought it would be good for her to develop her artistic abilities and sent her to work at the Royal Porcelain Factory where she soon began to create little flowers for Flora Danica series. In 1957, an older worker discovered many plasticine figures in her drawer depicting her fellow workers and famous visitors. He encouraged her to take private painting and sculpture lessons under Knud Brønsted in preparation for the Royal Danish Academy of Fine Arts. The following year she was admitted to the Academy where she studied under Gottfred Eickhoff and Mogens Bøggild, graduating in 1965. While at the Academy, she married her fellow sculpture student Eric Varming in 1962. They settled in an old smithy in Tølløse near Holbæk where they had four children together. They subsequently lived on the island of Femø, then in Sorø before building a home in Reerssø on the west Zealand coast.

Varming's works have always depicted human beings. Initially she created sculptures of her own children, later including older children, friends and family. Some represent slender girls, others elderly couples. One well-known item is Piger fra Paris (Girls from Paris, 1999), displayed in Copenhagen Airport. It was Varming who designed the commemorative coin for Crown Prince Frederik's 18th birthday and the new coins depicting Queen Margrethe in 1988–89. She began exhibiting at the Charlottenborg Spring Exhibition in 1963, later participating in solo exhibitions and in shows with the Kammeraterne Artists Cooperative and Galleri A Gruppen in the 1970s and 1980s. In 2014, her works were exhibited at Kastrupgård in connection with her 75th birthday.

Varming died on 30 October 2022.

== Awards ==
Hanne Varming has received several significant awards, including

- 1985: Tagea Brandts Rejselegat
- 1988: Eckersberg Medal
- 1990: Lifelong grant from the Danish Arts Foundation
- 2000: Order of the Dannebrog

== List of works ==
=== Public art, monuments and memorials ===
- Mathias, Refsnæsskolen, Kystvejen, Kalundborg (1966)
- Kone i døren, Værløse Bymidte, Værløse (1973)
- Det lange menneske, Mørkhøj Church, Mørkhøjvej, Herlevm Copenhagen (1975)
- Mor med børn, Dagcenter, Halsskovvej, Korsør (1976)
- Hyldemor, Kultorvet, Copenhagen (1980)
- Mor med to børn, Servicecenter Tarm, Toften, Tarm (1980)
- Sigrid Undset med datteren, Sigrid Undset Skolen, Frederik Andersensvej, Kalundborg (1982)
- Sin og Lut, Finsensgade, Aarhus (1984)
- Karen Margrethe, Markedspladsen, Aulum (1988)
- Hans Jacob, Cathrinegården, Cathrinestræde, Hjørring (1988)
- Kone på kasse, Bispebjerg Hospital, Copenhagen (1990)
- Oskar Hansen, Arbejdermuseet, Rømersgade, Copenhagen (1990)
- Torvekonen, Kirketorvet, Ballerup (1991)
- Apollonia-brønden, Sct. Leonis Gade, Viborg (1994)
- To på en bænk, Trapholt, Æblehaven, Kolding (1995)
- Kraft og kærtegn. Church of Our Lady, Reberbanen, Skive (1996)
- Konen med æggene, Kongensgade, Odense (1997)
- Skjernpigen (Nicole med stolen), Banktorvet, Skjern (1998)
- Pigerne fra Paris,, Copenhagen Airport, Kastrup, Copenhagen (1998)
- Konen med æggene, Sophienholm, Nybrovej, Kongens Lyngby (2000)
- Konen med æggene, Dybdalsparken, Dybdalsvej, Engesvang (2000)
- Emma på bænk, Naturkirkegården, Anders Larsensvej, Holbæk (2004)
- Emma, M. D. Madsens Vej, Lillerød (2003)
- Mand og barn på bænk, Møstings Hus, Smallegade, Frederiksberg (2007)
- Victor Borge, Victor Borges Plads, Østerbro, Copenhagen (2009)
- ''Konen med hundene, Valby Langgade, Valby (2013)
