= Ensomheden =

Island in Sermersooq, Greenland

- Location within Greenland

Geography
- Location: North Atlantic Ocean; Southeastern Greenland
- Coordinates: 63°43′30″N 41°13′45″W
- Length: 3.2 km (1.99 mi)
- Width: 1.5 km (0.93 mi)
- Highest elevation: 209 m (686 ft)

Administration
- Greenland
- Municipality: Sermersooq

Demographics
- Population: 0

Ensomheden, meaning 'Loneliness' in the Danish language, is an uninhabited island in southeastern Greenland. Administratively it is part of the Sermersooq municipality. The weather of the island is characterized by tundra climate.

== Geography ==
Ensomheden is an island in the Bernstorff Fjord of the King Frederick VI Coast, located between the Odinland Peninsula to the north and the Thorland Peninsula to the south. It lies within the fjord, about 33 kilometres (21 miles) from its mouth in the North Atlantic Ocean. The waters around the island are mostly clogged by ice calved by the active glaciers at the head of the fjord.

The island is 3.2 kilometres (2 miles) long with a maximum width of 1.5 kilometres (1 mile).

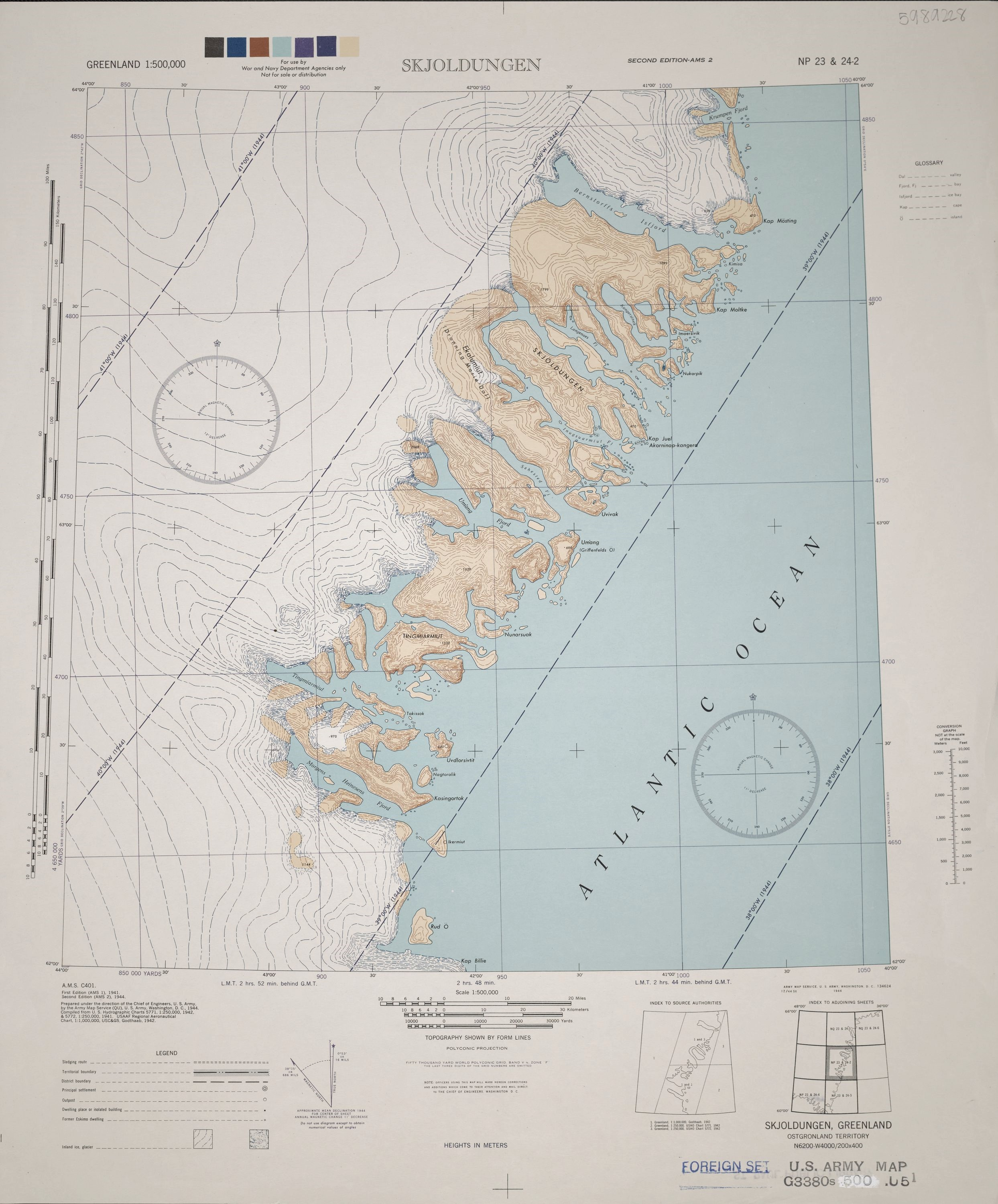
The Bernstorff Fjord in a 1944 map of the area around Skjoldungen.

== Bibliography ==
- Spencer Apollonio, Lands That Hold One Spellbound: A Story of East Greenland, 2008

== See also ==
- List of islands of Greenland
