= Lonely Island (disambiguation) =

The Lonely Island is an American comedy trio.

Lonely Island may also refer to:

== Media ==
- "Lonely Island" (Sam Cooke song), 1958
- "Lonely Island" (The Parliaments song), 1960
- Lonely Island (film), a 2014 film

== Geography ==
- Uyedineniya Island, an island in northern Russia
- Ensomheden, an island in Greenland
