= Cape Moltke =

Headland in southeast Greenland

Cape Moltke Kap Moltke, Kangeq
- Cape
- Coordinates: 63°29′N 40°47′W
- Location: King Frederick VI Coast
- Offshore water bodies: Irminger Sea (North Atlantic Ocean)

Area
  - Total: Arctic
- Elevation: 460 m (1,510 ft)

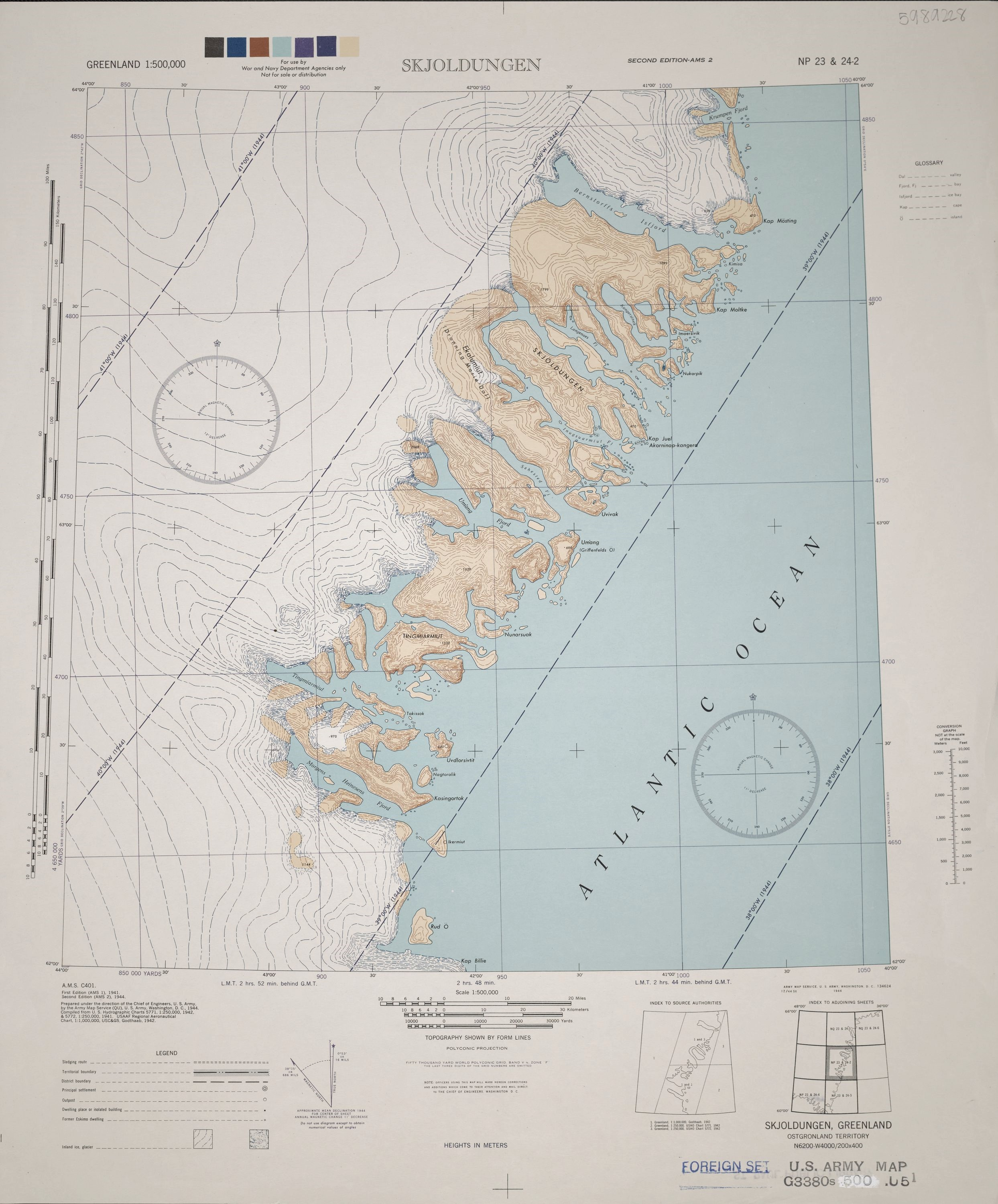
1944 map of the area around Skjoldungen showing Cape Moltke.

Cape Moltke (Danish: Kap Moltke; Greenlandic: Kangeq) is a headland in the North Atlantic Ocean, southeast Greenland, Kujalleq municipality.

== History ==
There are numerous ancient Inuit ruins in the shores of the coves and islands near the cape, remains of the former inhabitants of the area, the now extinct Southeast-Greenland Inuit.

Cape Moltke was named by Lieutenant Wilhelm August Graah in 1829 during his East Coast expedition. Graah noticed that north of the cape the land was more covered with snow than to the south. He named the headland after Danish Minister of State Count Adam Wilhelm Moltke of Bregentved.

== Geography ==
Cape Moltke is located at the eastern end of Thorland, 33 km (21 mi) NNE of Cape Niels Juel. It is a reddish-brown promontory with steep cliffs located about 10 km (6.2 mi) south of the mouth of Bernstorff Fjord.

North and south of Cape Moltke the coast is indented with small fjords and a number of offshore islands. Qimiitaa, Qeertartivaq and Kivinak are located northeast of the cape, on the southern side of the mouth of Bernstorff Fjord, and Kiasigssaq, among others, southwest of it.
