= Cape Møsting =

Headland in southeast Greenland

Cape Møsting Kap Mösting
- Cape
- Coordinates: 63°41′N 40°30′W
- Location: King Frederick VI Coast
- Offshore water bodies: Irminger Sea (North Atlantic Ocean)

Area
  - Total: Arctic
- Elevation: 475 m (1,558 ft)

Cape Møsting (Danish: Kap Møsting) is a headland in the North Atlantic Ocean, southeast Greenland, Kujalleq municipality.

== History ==
Cape Møsting was named by Lieutenant Wilhelm August Graah in 1829 during his East Coast expedition. Graah took a latitude observation at the headland and named it after Johan Sigismund von Møsting.

One of the umiak women rowers of Graah's party gave birth to twins at the cape. The Inuit babies died shortly after delivery and were buried in a cleft of the rocks of the two small islands off the SW side of Cape Møsting. Graah named these islands "Tvillingøen", Twin Islands, after the dead twins.

== Geography ==
Cape Møsting is located at the southeastern end of Odinland. It is a steep and prominent headland on the northern side of the mouth of Bernstorff Fjord. Usually great masses of icebergs lie near the fjord entrance to the south of the cape making navigation along the shore difficult. Dangerous eddies and whirlpools form within the bank of icebergs as powerful currents flow out of the fjord. Tvillingøen, two small islands rise near the cape.

North of Cape Møsting the coast of Odinland is steep and covered with glaciers that jut out into the sea at every indentation of the roughly north-trending shore until Otte Krumpen Fjord (Quseertaliip Kangertiva) located 11 km (6.8 mi) to the north of the cape. Further north rise the icy cliffs of the Kangerajiip Apusiia (Colberger Heide) tidewater glacier.

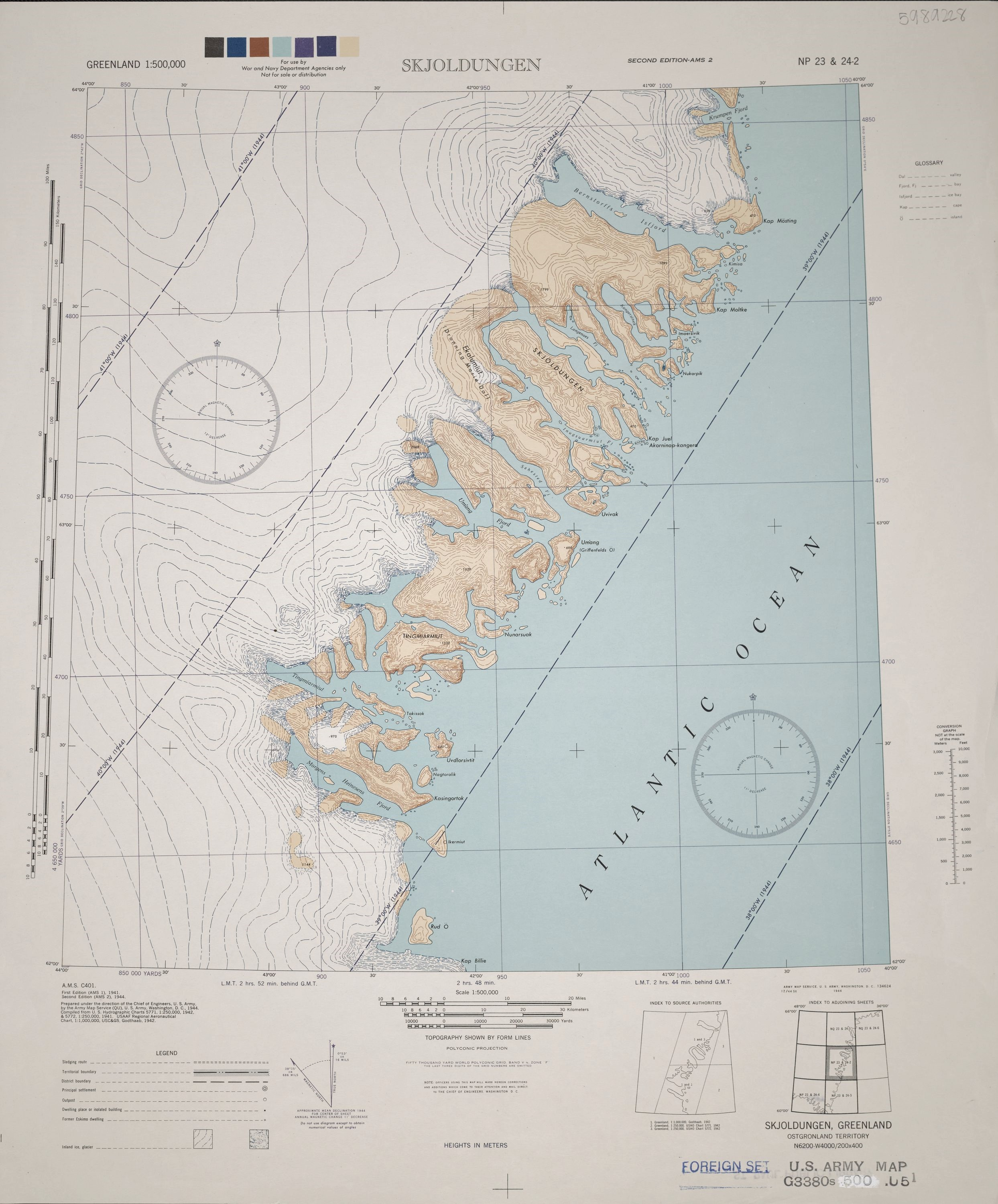
1944 map of the area around Skjoldungen showing Cape Møsting.
