= Alfheimbjerg =

Mountain in Greenland

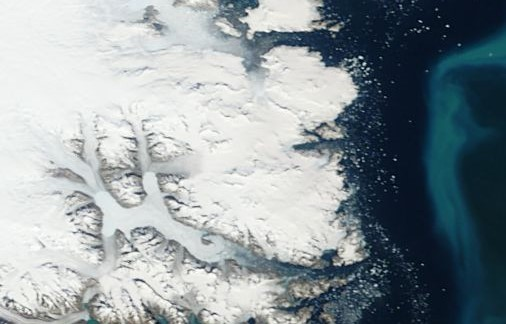
- Odinland NASA picture section

Highest point
- Elevation: 1,320 m (4,330 ft)
- Listing: List of nunataks
- Coordinates: 63°50′53″N 41°34′9″W

Geography
- Location within Greenland
- Location: Sermersooq, Greenland

Climbing
- First ascent: Unclimbed

Alfheimbjerg (meaning "Alfheim Mountain" in Danish) is a mountain in the King Frederick VI Coast, Sermersooq, southeastern Greenland.

It is named after Álfheimr, the abode of the elves in Norse mythology.

== Geography ==
This mountain is a nunatak that rises off the southwestern end of the Odinland peninsula, between the western side of the Fimbul Glacier terminus and the northern side of the terminus of the Bernstorff Glacier.

To the northeast of Alfheimbjerg, on the opposite side of the Fimbul Glacier, rises the Brages Range by the confluence of the Sleipner Glacier.

== See also ==
- List of mountains in Greenland
- List of nunataks
