= Storebjørn Glacier =

Glacier in Greenland

- Storebjørn Gletscher
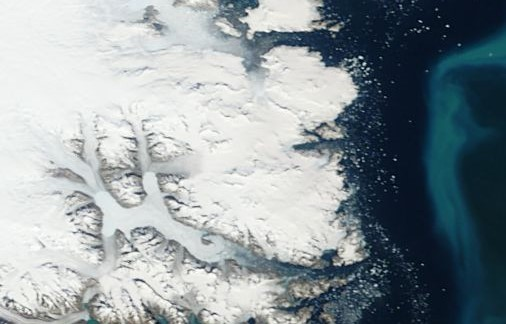
- Odinland NASA picture section with the Storebjørn Glacier on the lower left

- Location within Greenland
- Type: Piedmont glacier
- Location: SE Greenland
- Coordinates: 63°44′N 41°40′W
- Length: 60 km (37 mi)
- Width: 4 km (2.5 mi)
- Terminus: Bernstorff Fjord (Kangertittivaq)

Storebjørn Glacier (Danish: Storebjørn Gletscher), is a glacier in the King Frederick VI Coast, Sermersooq, southeastern Greenland.

This glacier was named after Storebjørn, a mountain in Norway.

== Geography ==
The Storebjørn is an active glacier originating in the eastern side of the Greenland Ice Sheet. It flows northward at the western end of the Thorland peninsula and ends at the head of the Bernstorff Fjord (Kangertittivaq), to the south of the Bernstorff Glacier terminus. The Svartalfbjerg rises to the northwest.

The Storebjørn is one of the fast-flowing glaciers producing massive amounts of ice that blocks the fjord.

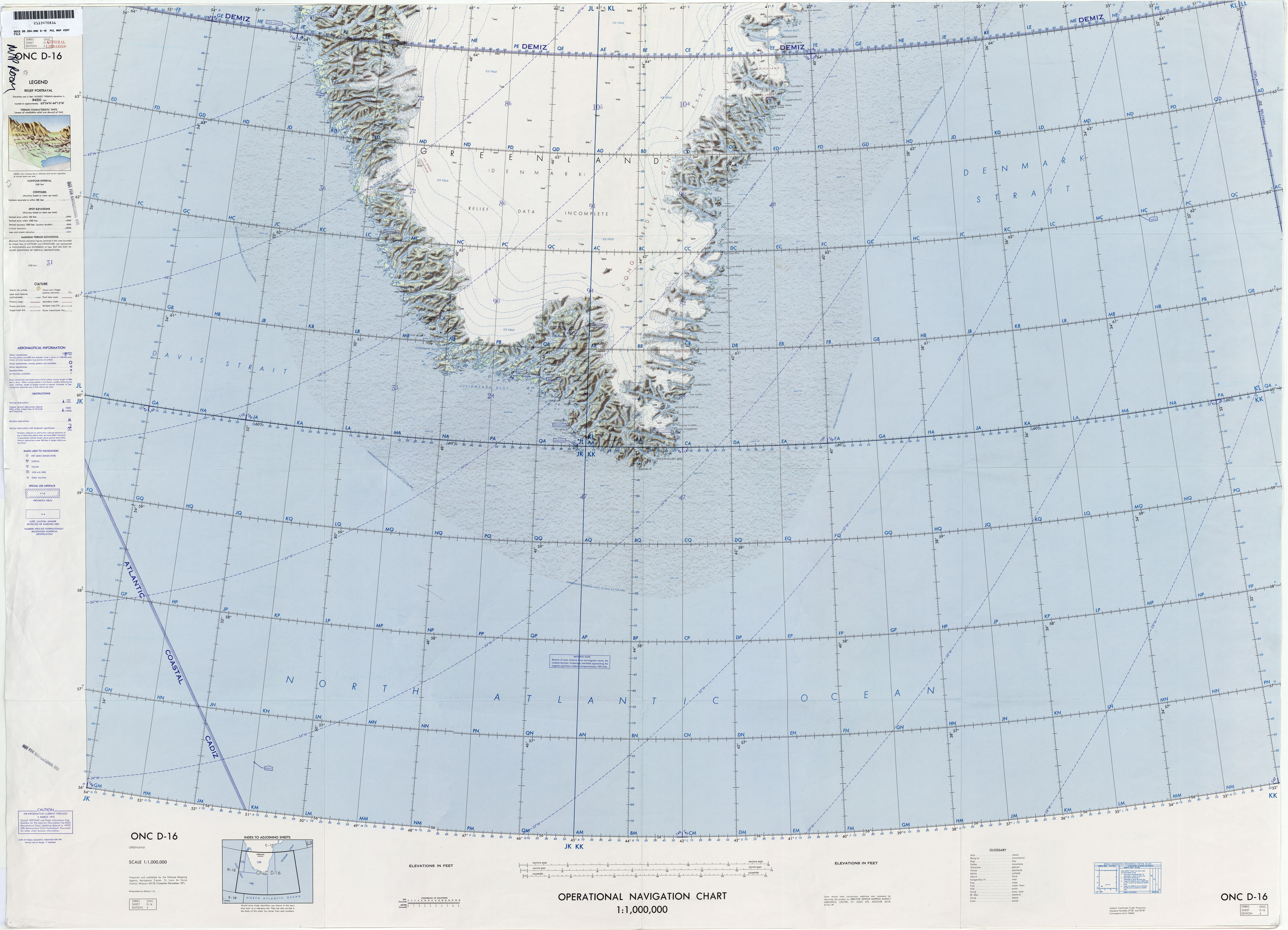
ONC map of the southern part of Greenland

== See also ==
- List of glaciers in Greenland
