= Bernstorff Fjord =

Fjord in Greenland

- Kangertittivaq; Bernstorff Isfjord
- Kangertittivaq (Greenlandic)
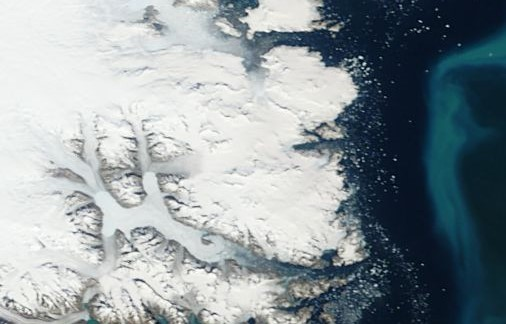
- NASA picture with the Bernstorff Fjord in the bottom half

- Location in Greenland
- Location: Arctic
- Coordinates: 63°42′N 41°10′W
- Ocean/sea sources: North Atlantic Ocean
- Basin countries: Greenland

Bernstorff Fjord (Danish: Bernstorff Isfjord; Greenlandic: Kangertittivaq) is a fjord in King Frederick VI Coast, eastern Greenland.

Administratively it is part of the Sermersooq municipality. The fjord was named after Danish statesman Andreas Peter Bernstorff. This fjord is almost always blocked by heavy ice.

== History ==
One of the coastal islands, Igdluluarssuk (Sattiaatteq) at the entrance of the fjord on its southern side, had had the northernmost Inuit settlement of the southern group on the east coast in the recent past.

Arctic explorer Wilhelm August Graah of the Danish Navy explored this area in 1828–30, during an expedition in search of the legendary Eastern Norse Settlement.

== Geography ==
Map of Bernstorff Fjord

To the east the Bernstorff Fjord opens into the Irminger Sea (North Atlantic Ocean). It separates the Odinland Peninsula with its SE end, Cape Møsting to the north, from the Thorland Peninsula and Cape Moltke to the south of the fjord. A single island, Ensomheden, is located within the fjord about 33 kilometres (21 miles) from its mouth.

The Storebjørn, Bernstorff, Fimbul and Sleipner glaciers at the head of this fjord produce massive amounts of ice. The Ydun Glacier, Gerd Glacier and Gymer Glacier are smaller glaciers flowing from Odinland into the northern shore of Bernstorff Fjord, and the Tjalfe Glacier and Røskva Glacier flow from Thorland into the southern shore. The constant glacier activity produces a powerful current streaming out of the fjord which, together with the numerous ice floes, makes navigation hazardous in the area between its mouth and Umivik Bay.

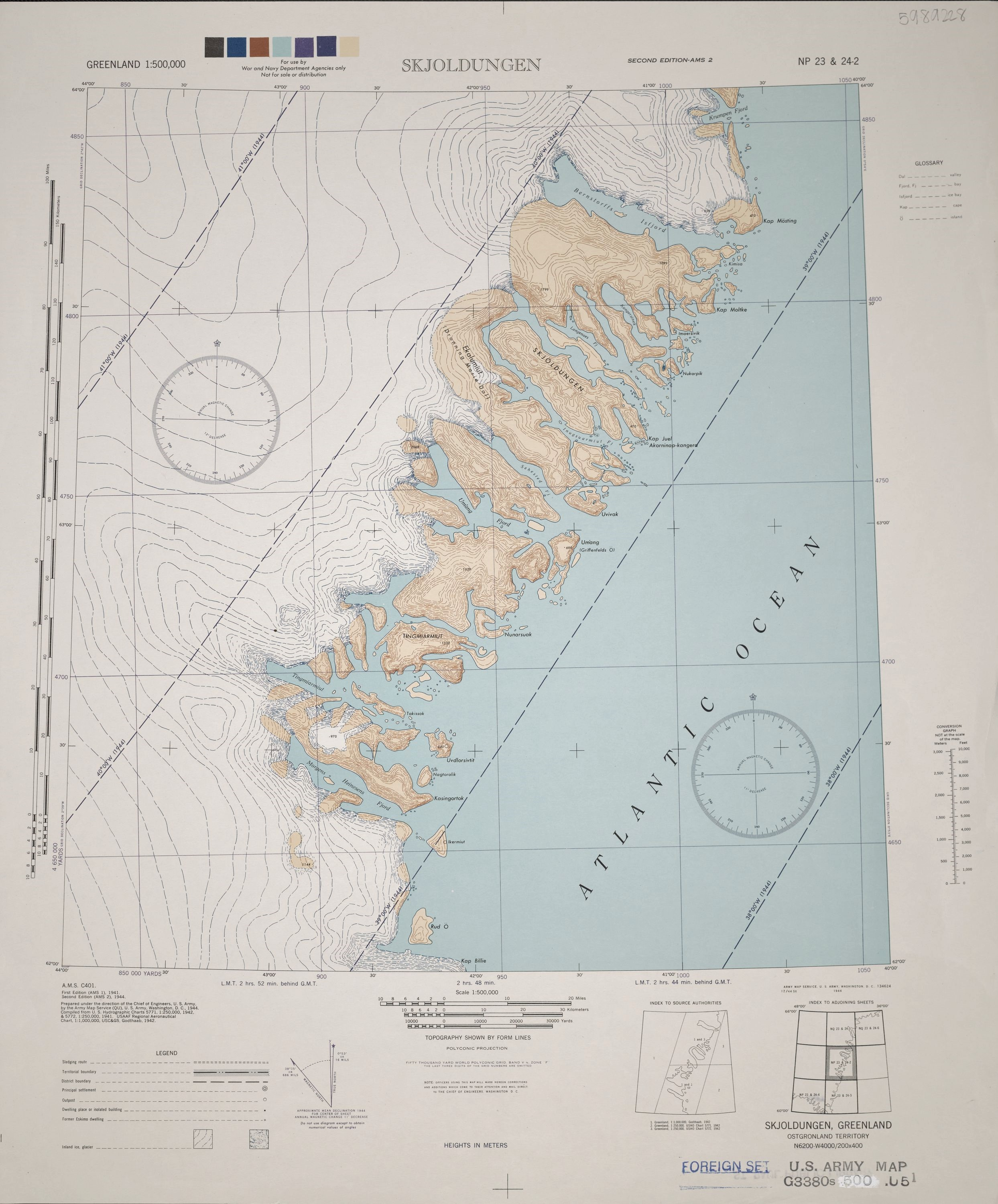
1944 map of the area around Skjoldungen.

== See also ==
- List of fjords of Greenland

== Bibliography ==
- Spencer Apollonio, Lands That Hold One Spellbound: A Story of East Greenland, 2008
