= Albrecht von Bernstorff =

Albrecht von Bernstorff may refer to:

- Albrecht von Bernstorff (diplomat, born 1809), Prussian ambassador and foreign minister
- Albrecht von Bernstorff (diplomat, born 1890), German politician and member of the resistance to Nazi Germany, grandson of the above
