= Ensom Majestaet =

Mountain in Greenland

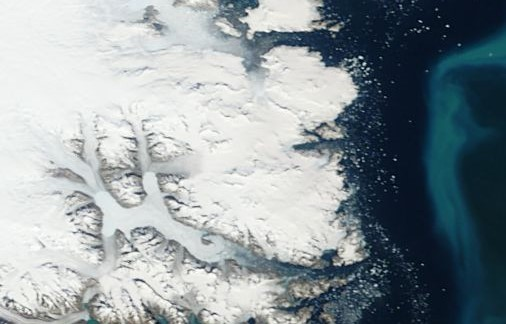
- Odinland NASA picture section

Highest point
- Elevation: 1,591 m (5,220 ft)
- Listing: List of nunataks
- Coordinates: 63°52′0″N 40°57′0″W

Geography
- Location within Greenland
- Location: Sermersooq, Greenland

Climbing
- First ascent: Unclimbed

Ensom Majestaet (meaning "Solitary Majesty" in Danish) is the highest mountain in Odinland, SE Greenland. It is located in the municipality of Sermersooq, 500 km east of the capital, Nuuk.

== Geography ==
This mountain is a nunatak that rises roughly in the middle of the peninsula, east of the westward-flowing Sleipner Glacier and a little west of the Gungnir Ice Cap.

== See also ==
- List of mountains in Greenland
- List of nunataks
