= Andreas Peter Bernstorff =

Danish diplomat (1735–1797)

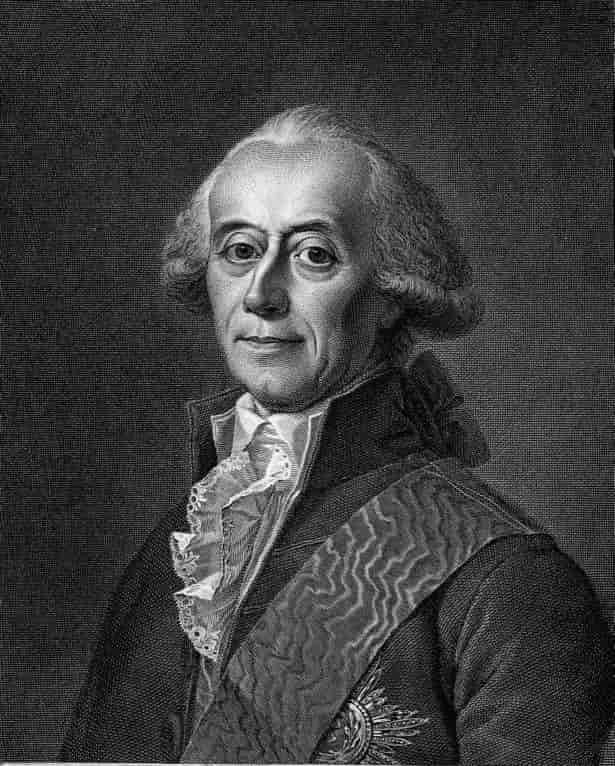

Privy Councillor of Denmark
- Predecessor: Ove Høegh-Guldberg
- Successor: Christian Günther von Bernstorff
- Born: 28 August 1735; Hanover, Electorate of Hanover
- Died: 21 June 1797 (aged 61); Copenhagen, Kingdom of Denmark-Norway
- Issue: Christian Günther von Bernstorff, Joachim Frederik Bernstorff
- Occupation: Minister, diplomat

Andreas Peter Bernstorff (28 August 1735 – 21 June 1797), also known as Andreas Peter Graf von Bernstorff, was a Danish diplomat and Foreign Minister. He was a guardian of civil and political liberty.

== Background and early career ==
Bernstorff was born in Hanover as a nephew of the statesman Johann Hartwig Ernst von Bernstorff (1712-72), whose position probably introduced him to Danish politics. His uncle induced him to study in the German and Swiss universities and travel for some years in Italy, France, England and Holland, to prepare himself for a statesman’s career. During these years he made the acquaintance of the poets Gellert and Jacobi, the writer Jean-Jacques Barthélemy, the duc de Choiseul, and Gottfried Achenwall, the statistician. After his European tour, he joined the Danish state service, first as a courtier and then from 1760 as a state official, both in foreign political and financial matters. His career was slow but steady. During the 1760s, he placed himself as an able but not outstanding official closely connected to his uncle. In the Struensee years from 1770–71, he was dismissed, but soon he was recalled by the new regime of Ove Høegh-Guldberg. He worked at first in the financial and economical departments, and took a special interest in agriculture. The improvements he introduced in the tenures of his peasantry anticipated in some respects the agricultural reforms of the next generation.

In 1773, Bernstorff was appointed Minister of Foreign Affairs and his real Danish career began. He carried through the final solution of the Gottorp question through an exchange of territory with the Russian imperial family (in the 1773 Treaty of Tsarskoye Selo) and a Russian alliance. In general he supported a pro-Russian (but independent) line trying to hold Sweden in check. Since he saw Sweden as "Denmark-Norway's most active and irreconcilable enemy" and France as a Swedish ally, he avoided any conflict with England, seen as France's adversary. He created an outstanding position for himself but also made many enemies within the government. This was partly due to his alleged willfulness and partly due to political rivalry. The difficult years during the American War of Independence strengthened his wishes of an "active neutrality". His sympathy with England grew stronger when in 1779 Spain joined her enemies; and he was much inclined, the same winter, to join a triple alliance between Great Britain, Russia and Denmark-Norway, proposed by England for the purpose of compelling the Bourbon powers to accept reasonable terms of peace. But he was overruled by the Crown Prince Frederick, who thought such a policy too hazardous, when Russia declined to have anything to do with it. In 1780 he concluded a League of Neutrality with Russia and Sweden, a great foreign political triumph. At the same time he concluded a special agreement with England that secured Danish trade. A deep but temporary Russian dissatisfaction with the treaty, however, was exploited by his Danish rivals, and in November 1780, he was dismissed by Guldberg.

Bernstorff kept in the background in 1780-84 as an interested observer of the political situation, but he still enjoyed support in Copenhagen merchant circles and did not give up his political ambitions. Very early, he was connected to Crown Prince Frederick (Frederick VI) and became a part of the conspiracy against Guldberg. He supported the coup d'état of 1784, which made Frederick the Prince Regent.

== Foreign Minister 1784-97 ==
Bernstorff was for second time made Minister of Foreign Affairs in May 1784, and that opened his real golden age. Until his death, he was in reality “prime minister” of Denmark, the leading man of the cabinet by whose advice the Prince Regent was normally guided. He was also temporarily the President of Danish Chancellery (Home Office) in 1788-89.

In Scandinavian matters, Bernstorff carried on a cautious pro-Russian policy without clashing with Sweden. The Russo-Swedish War in 1787-90 led to an abortive Danish involvement in 1788, and he managed to escape without any open breaks. During the next years he gradually phased out the Russian alliance and tried to improve relations to Sweden.

Bernstorff's most important problem in this period was the French Revolution and the wars in its wake. He firmly maintained a neutral line and showed his special virtuosity in balancing the great powers in order to protect Danish trade. He strongly kept to international law but avoided provocation. His diplomacy was strong but not rigid, and he maintained the economic position of the Danish merchants and in spite of problems with both France and England. All the while, he made his course respected. Among other things, he firmly avoided a politics of convoy while he clearly refused to take any part in the intervention in France. This was probably due to his principally neutral line but also partly to his growing respect of national integrity.

== Domestic politics and conclusion ==
Bernstorff was of course a foreign politician, but because of his leading role he clearly influenced domestic politics. Very early on he was known as a supporter of independent farmers and of the great agrarian reforms (the abolition of Adscription 1788) and other reform laws of the 1790s. A loyal supporter of Danish absolutism, he was, however, in many ways a liberal by nature and the relative freedom of the press of this period was probably due to his wishes. His sympathies toward England and English political conditions—quite contrary to those of his uncle—influenced him. His cultural interests were great but he did not much influence them to any extent.

Bernstorff is still considered one of the great Danish statesmen of the 18th century probably overshadowing his uncle. To his contemporaries his relatively early death was felt as a great misfortune – though it is impossible to decide whether he would have been able to maintain his political line. Being characterised a hot-tempered and cantankerous official as a young man, he gradually emerged as a brilliant and adroit man of the world. In many ways he was one of the last representatives of the German aristocratic statesmen of Danish state service before the national reaction began.

== Family ==
Count Bernstorff was twice married. On 3 December 1762 he married in Copenhagen Countess Henriette zu Stolberg-Stolberg (1747-1782). After the death of his first wife, he married on 7 August 1783 her sister Augusta Louise of Stolberg-Stolberg. His wives were daughters of Count Christian Günther zu Stolberg-Stolberg (1714–1765) and Countess Christiane Charlotte zu Castell-Remlingen (1722–1773) and sisters of Count Christian zu Stolberg-Stolberg and Count Friedrich Leopold zu Stolberg-Stolberg. He left seven sons and three daughters by his first wife. His son Count Christian Günther von Bernstorff (1769-1835) served as Danish secretary of state for foreign affairs and privy councillor. Another son Count Joachim Frederik von Bernstorff (1771-1835) was attached to the Danish service and was associated with his brother in representing Denmark at the Congress of Vienna and in 1815 was appointed ambassador at that court.

== Posthumous honours ==
Bernstorff Fjord and Bernstorff Glacier in Eastern Greenland were named after Andreas Peter Bernstorff.

The Bernstorff-Gymnasium Satrup, a school in Schleswig-Holstein, is named after both Andreas Peter von Bernstorff and his uncle Count Johann Hartwig Ernst von Bernstorff.

== Sources ==
- Dansk Biografisk Leksikon, vol. 2., 1980.

Political offices
Preceded by Ove Høegh-Guldberg	Privy Councillor of Denmark; 1784 - 1797	Succeeded by Christian Günther von Bernstorff
