= Christian Günther von Bernstorff =

Danish and Prussian statesman

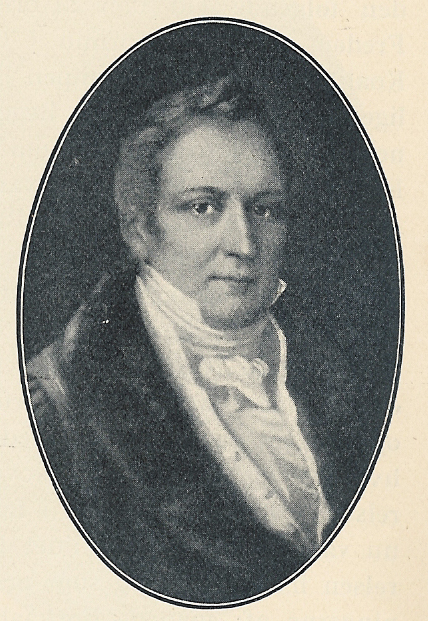

Privy Councillor of Denmark
- Predecessor: Andreas Peter Bernstorff
- Successor: Frederik Moltke
- Born: 3 April 1769; Copenhagen, Denmark-Norway
- Died: 18 March 1835 (aged 65)
- Father: Andreas Peter von Bernstorff
- Occupation: Diplomat

Count Christian Günther von Bernstorff (German: Christian Günther Graf von Bernstorff; 3 April 1769 – 18 March 1835) was a Danish and Prussian statesman and diplomat.

== Early life and career ==
Bernstorff was born in Copenhagen on 3 April 1769 to Count Andreas Peter von Bernstorff. He was educated for the diplomatic service under his father's direction. He began his career in 1787, as attaché to the representative of Denmark at the opening of the Diet of Sweden.

In 1789, he went as secretary of legation to Berlin, where his maternal uncle, Count Leopold Friedrich zu Stolberg, was Danish ambassador. His uncle's influence, as well as his own social qualities, obtained him rapid promotion; he was soon chargé d'affaires, and in 1791 minister plenipotentiary. In 1794, he exchanged this post for the important one of ambassador at Stockholm, where he remained until May 1797, when he was summoned to Copenhagen to act as substitute for his father during his illness. On the death of the latter (21 June), he succeeded him as secretary of state for foreign affairs and privy councillor.

In 1800, he became head of the ministry. He remained responsible for the foreign policy of Denmark until May 1810, a fateful period which saw the battle of Copenhagen (2 April 1801), the bombardment of Copenhagen, and the capture of the Danish fleet in 1807.

After his retirement, he remained without office until his appointment in 1811 as Danish ambassador at Vienna. He remained here, despite Denmark being nominally at war with Austria, until, in January 1814, on the accession of Denmark to the coalition against Napoleon, he publicly resumed his functions as ambassador. He accompanied the emperor Francis to Paris, and was present at the signature of the first peace of Paris.

With his brother Joachim, he represented Denmark at the Congress of Vienna and, as a member for the commission for the regulation of the affairs of the German confederation, was responsible for some of that confusion of Danish and German interests which was to bear bitter fruit later in the Schleswig-Holstein question. He again accompanied the allied sovereigns to Paris in 1815, returning to Copenhagen the same year. In 1817, he was appointed Danish ambassador at Berlin, his brother Joachim going at the same time to Vienna.

== Prussian service ==
In the following year, Prince Hardenberg made him the formal proposition that he should transfer his services to Prussia, which, with the leave of his sovereign, he did.

It was, therefore, as a Prussian diplomat that Bernstorff attended the Congress of Aix-la-Chapelle (October 1818), at the close of which he returned to Berlin as minister of state and head of the department for foreign affairs. Bernstorff's management of Prussian policy throughout the many years that he remained in office has been variously judged. He was by training and temperament against the Revolution, and he was initiated into his new duties as a Prussian minister by the reactionary Ancillon. He is accused of having subordinated the particular interests of Prussia to the European policy of Metternich and the Holy Alliance. Whether any other policy would in the long run have served Prussia better is a matter for speculation. It is true that Bernstorff backed the Carlsbad Decrees, and the Vienna Final Act; he was also the faithful henchman of Metternich at the congresses of Laibach, Troppau and Verona. On the other hand, he took a considerable share in laying the groundwork of the customs union (Zollverein), which was destined to be the foundation of the Prussian hegemony in Germany. In his support of Russia's action against Turkey in 1828 also he showed that he was no blind follower of Metternich's views. In the crisis of 1830 his moderation in face of the warlike clamour of the military party at Berlin did much to prevent the troubles in Belgium and Poland from ending in a universal European conflagration.

From 1824 onward, Bernstorff had been a constant sufferer from hereditary gout, intensified and complicated by the results of overwork. In the spring of 1832, the state of his health compelled him to resign the ministry of foreign affairs to Ancillon, who had already acted as his deputy for a year. He died in 1835.

Adam Zamoyski however claims Bernstorff was in fact dismissed from office in 1832 due to an intrigue organized by Metternich in which a letter from emperor Francis I to king Frederick William III with the seal broken was planted in Bernstorff's office and then "discovered".

== Sources ==
- Jakob Caro (1875). "Bernstorff, Christian Graf von" . Allgemeine Deutsche Biographie (in German). Vol. 2. Leipzig: Duncker & Humblot. pp. 494–499.
- Hermann Kellenbenz (1955). "Bernstorff, Christian Günther Graf von". Neue Deutsche Biographie (in German). Vol. 2. Berlin: Duncker & Humblot. pp. 139–140. (full text online).

Political offices
Preceded by Andreas Peter Bernstorff	Privy Councillor of Denmark; 1797 - 1810	Succeeded by Frederik Moltke
