= Bernstorff Glacier =

Glacier in Greenland

- Bernstorff Gletscher
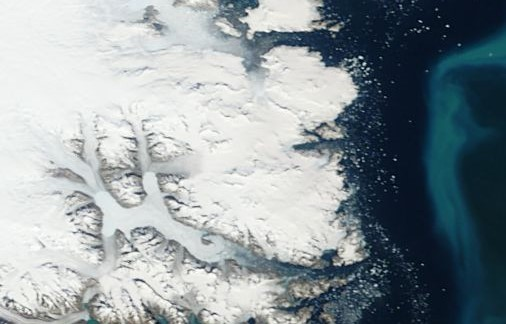
- Odinland NASA picture section with the Bernstorff Glacier on the left side

- Location within Greenland
- Type: Piedmont glacier
- Location: SE Greenland
- Coordinates: 63°50′N 41°43′W
- Length: 70 km (43 mi)
- Width: 6 km (3.7 mi)
- Terminus: Bernstorff Fjord (Kangertittivaq)

Bernstorff Glacier (Danish: Bernstorff Gletscher, also referred to as A.P. Bernstorf Gletscher), is a glacier in the King Frederick VI Coast, Sermersooq, southeastern Greenland.

Like the fjord, this glacier was named after Danish statesman Andreas Peter Bernstorff.

== Geography ==
The Bernstorff Glacier is a fast-flowing glacier originating in the eastern side of the Greenland Ice Sheet. It flows roughly south/southeastward and is joined by a branch flowing from the north with the confluence west of Alfheimbjerg. Its terminus is in the Bernstorff Fjord (Kangertittivaq), slightly to the west of the terminus of the Fimbul Glacier and to the north of the Storebjørn Glacier. Together the Bernstorff and Fimbul glaciers produce massive amounts of ice that blocks the fjord.

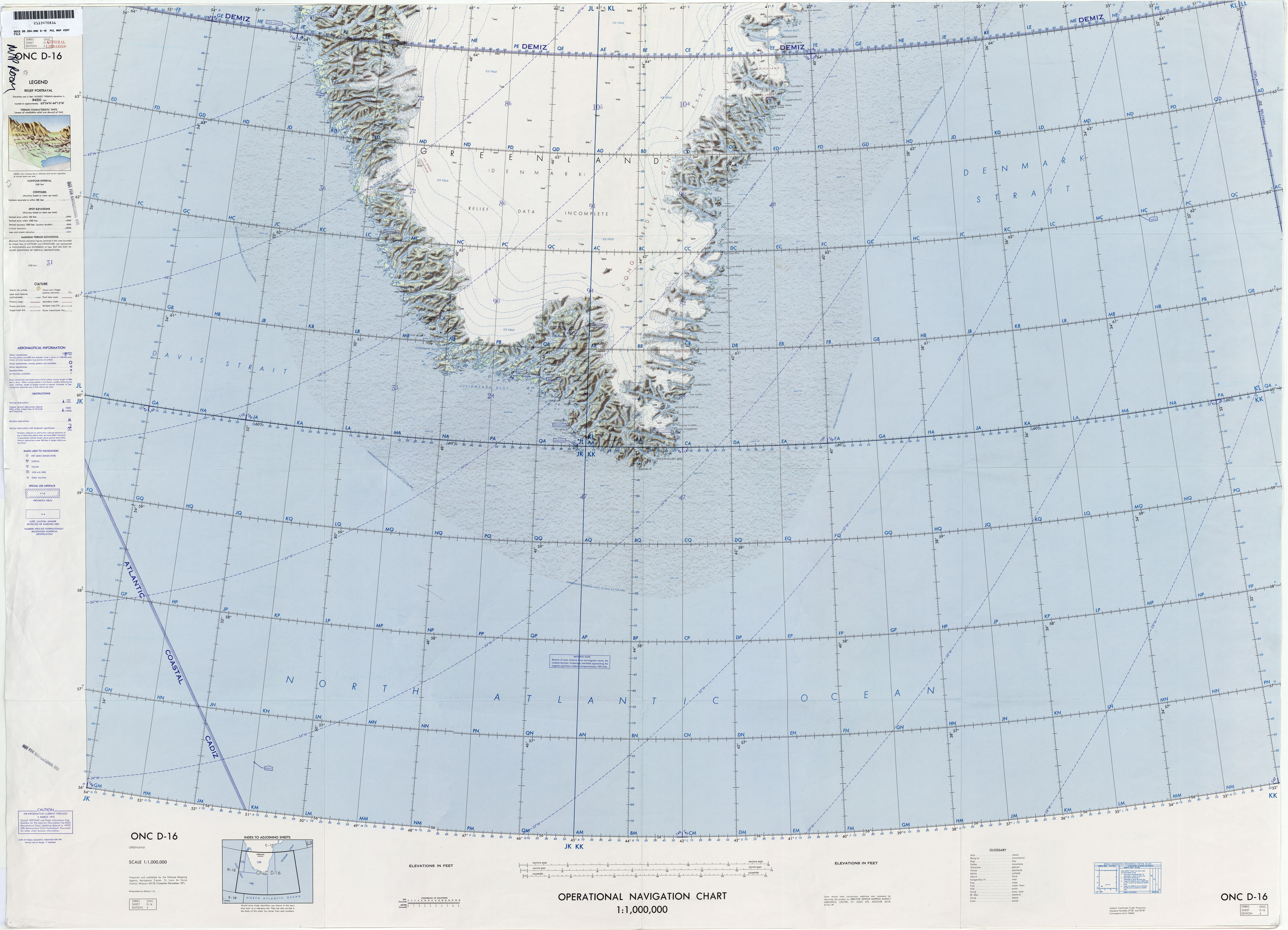
Map of part of Greenland section.

== Bibliography ==
- Climate-related glacier fluctuations in southeast Greenland

== See also ==
- List of glaciers in Greenland
