= Fimbul Glacier =

Glacier in eastern Greenland

- Fimbulgletscher
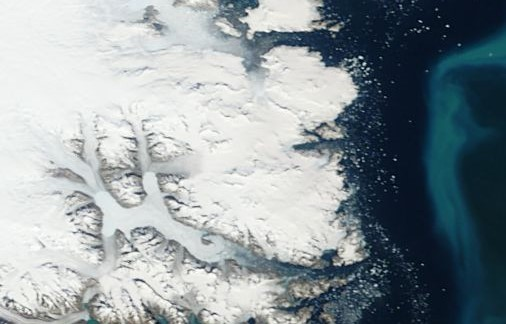
- Odinland NASA picture section with the Fimbul Glacier on the left

- Location within Greenland
- Type: Piedmont glacier
- Location: Odinland, Greenland
- Coordinates: 63°56′N 41°31′W
- Length: 50 km (31 mi)
- Width: 4 km (2.5 mi)
- Terminus: Bernstorff Fjord (Kangertittivaq)

Fimbul Glacier (Danish: Fimbulgletscher), is a glacier in eastern Greenland.

This glacier was named after an Old Norse word for "giant" or "mighty".

== Geography ==
The Fimbul Glacier originates in western Odinland, a glaciated peninsula. It flows southward from the area of the Ensomme Skraent ('Lonely Slope'), and joins the Sleipner Glacier from its left side just north of its terminus in the Bernstorff Fjord (Kangertittivaq) and west of the Brages Range. Alfheimbjerg is a mountain further south, rising between the western side of the Fimbul Glacier terminus and the terminus of the Bernstorff Glacier . Together the Sleipner and Fimbul glaciers produce massive amounts of ice that blocks the fjord.

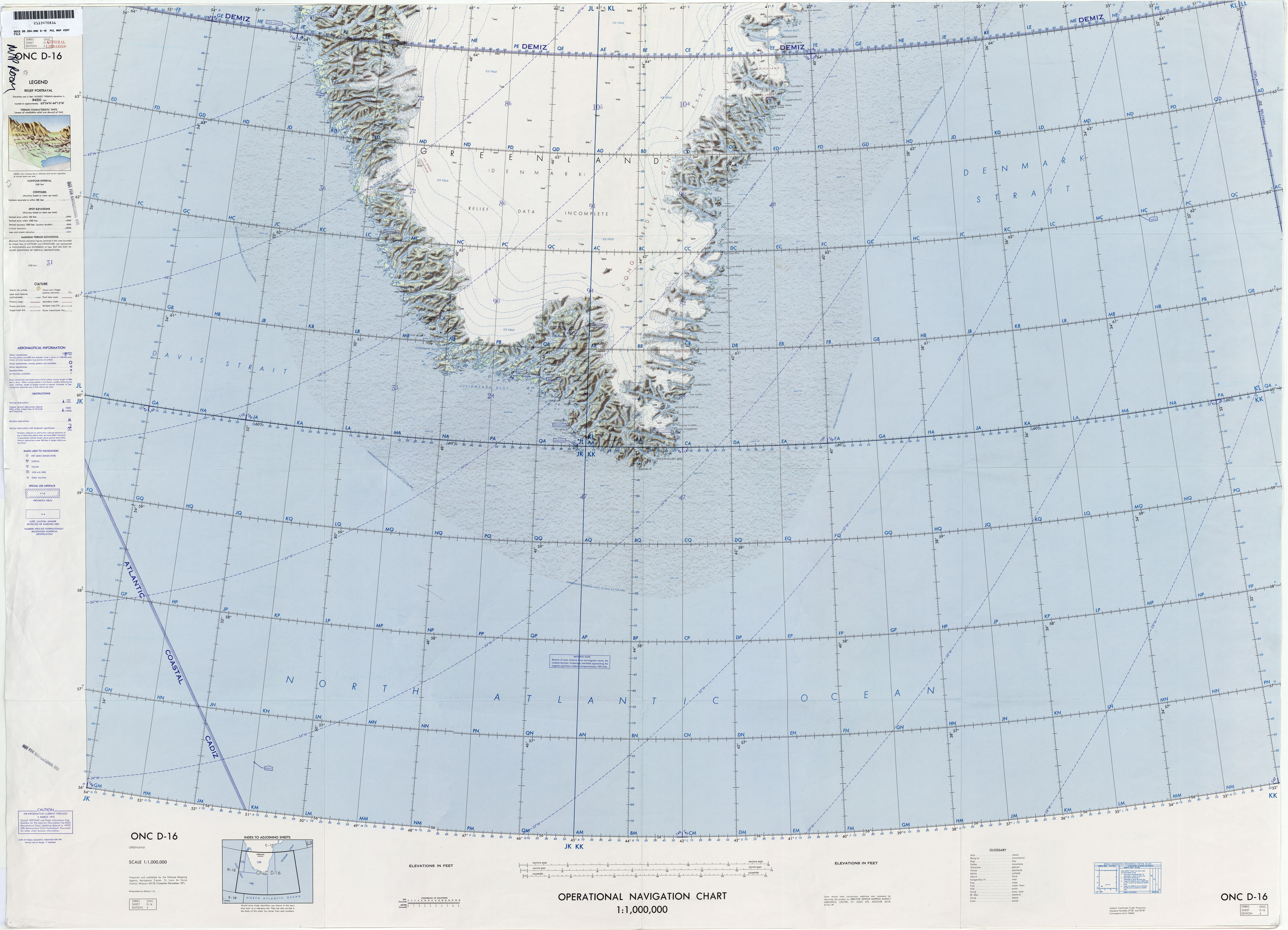
Map of part of Greenland section.

== Bibliography ==
- Climate-related glacier fluctuations in southeast Greenland

== See also ==
- List of glaciers in Greenland
