= Thorland =

Peninsula in Sermersooq, Greenland

- Location within Greenland

Geography
- Location: Southeast Greenland
- Coordinates: 63°34′N 41°30′W
- Adjacent to: Bernstorff Fjord Irminger Sea; Northern Skjoldungen Fjord
- Length: 47 km (29.2 mi)
- Width: 29 km (18 mi)
- Highest elevation: 1,915.9 m (6285.8 ft)
- Highest point: Ansbjerg

Administration
- Greenland (Denmark)
- Municipality: Sermersooq

Demographics
- Population: 0

Thorland (Danish: Thors Land) is a peninsula in the King Frederick VI Coast, southeastern Greenland. It is a part of the Sermersooq municipality.

== History ==
One of the coastal islands, Igdluluarssuk (Sattiaatteq) at the entrance of the fjord on its southern side, had had the northernmost Inuit settlement of the southern group on the east coast in the recent past.

Arctic explorer Wilhelm August Graah of the Danish Navy explored this area in 1828–30, during an expedition in search of the legendary Eastern Norse Settlement and named this peninsula after Thor.

In 1931 Norway sent two expeditions to establish hunting, meteorological and radio stations in Southeast Greenland. Founded by Finn Devold, on Ship Heimen from Tromsø, a Norwegian station was built in southern Thorland and named Finnsbu. The other expedition, led by Ole Mortensen, went to Storefjord (Kangerlussuaq Fjord) on ship Signalhorn and built a hut there. Since hunting there was poor, Mortensen moved with his men south to Lindenow Fjord, where a station named Moreton was built which was later moved to neighboring Nanuuseq Fjord and renamed Torgilsbu. Finnsbu was abandoned following the 1933 resolution of the Permanent Court of International Justice rejecting Norway's claims in Greenland.

== Geography ==
Map of Thorland

Thorland is surrounded to the northeast by the Bernstorff Fjord —across which lies the Odinland Peninsula, to the east by the Irminger Sea and to the southwest by the Northern Skjoldungen Fjord, with Skjoldungen on the facing shore.

To the west and the northwest the peninsula is attached to the mainland. Cape Moltke is the easternmost point. The southern part has a deeply indented coast dividing into three narrow arms jutting southeastwards with deep fjords between them, including the Graah Fjord, Jætte Fjord and Kangerdlikajik. Several glaciers pour into the Bernstorff Fjord from the northern side of the peninsula, the most important of which are Storebjørn Glacier, Tjalfe Glacier and Røskva Glacier, while the Jomfruen in the west has its terminus in the Norrevig, an offshoot of the Northern Skjoldungen Fjord.

There are several islands at the mouth of the fjords at the eastern end of the peninsula the largest of which are Tupikajik, Akorninarmiut, Imaarsivik, Kiasigssaq, Qiputalik, Nappat, Qeertartivaq and Igdluluarssuk (Sattiaatteq) where there are Paleo-Eskimo archaeological sites.

=== Mountains ===
This desolate peninsula is a destination for mountain climbing owing to some of its sturdy granite walls and jagged peaks. Its highest point is 1,916 m high Ansbjerg, a nunatak rising above the Norrevig in the SW at 63°34′35″N 41°40′5″W. Other notable summits are Kokkefars Hat, a conspicuous 996 m high peak at 63°27′5″N 41°33′25″W in the southernmost arm of the peninsula, Hvidbræmmen, a 1,304 m high peak in the northern side of Thorland, Hvide Telt, Hakkefjeld, Hanekammen and Rypefjeldet.

In Thorland there are several nunataks besides Ansbjerg, such as Akuliaruseq, Diabastoppen, Skønheden and Strudsen. Svartalfbjerg is a mountain on the west side of the Storebjørn Glacier.

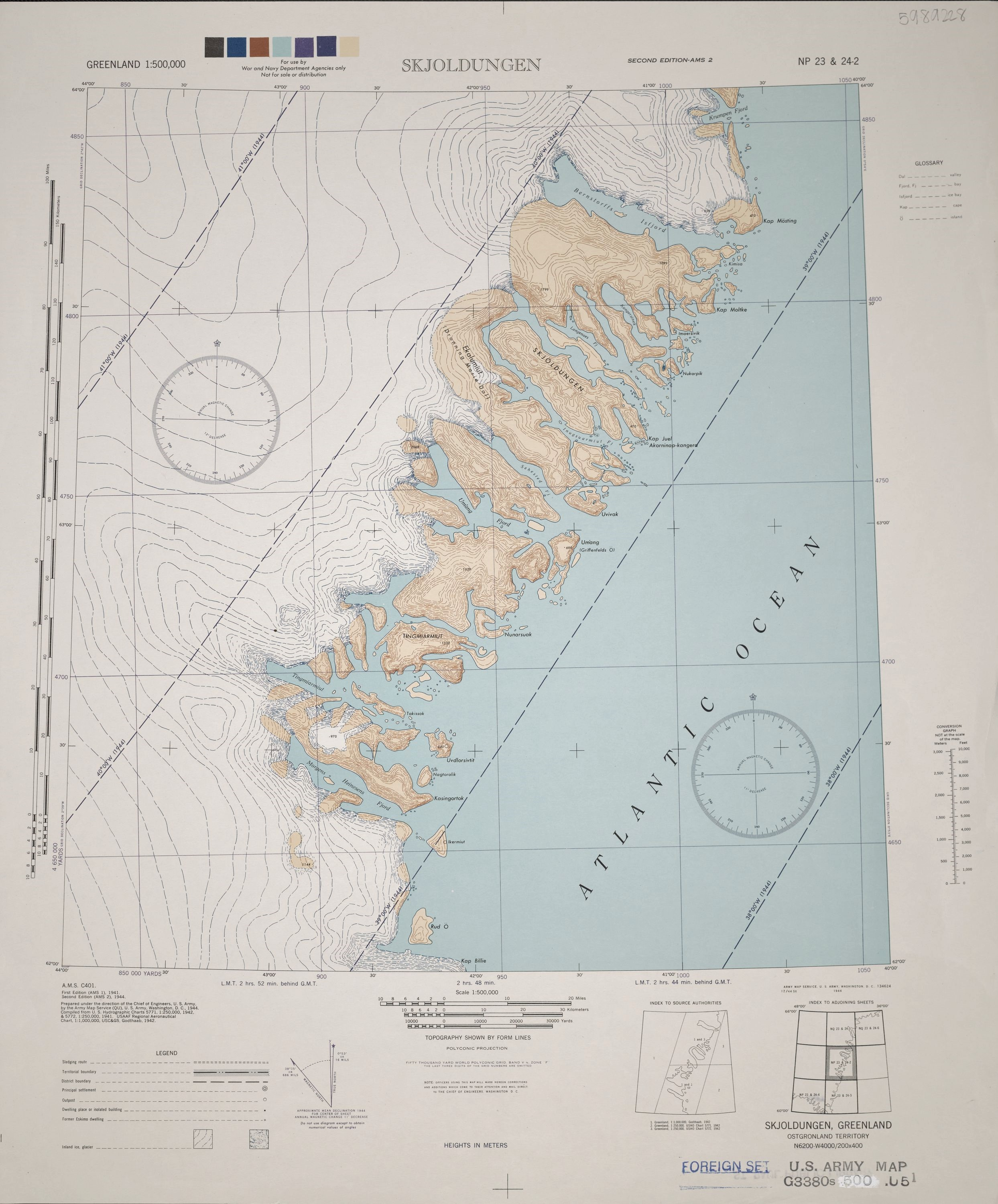
1944 map of the area around Skjoldungen with the Thorland Peninsula just north of the island.

== See also ==
- Renland
- Skjoldungen
- Tunumiit
