= Johan Sigismund von Møsting =

Danish banker and politician

Johan Sigismund von Mösting
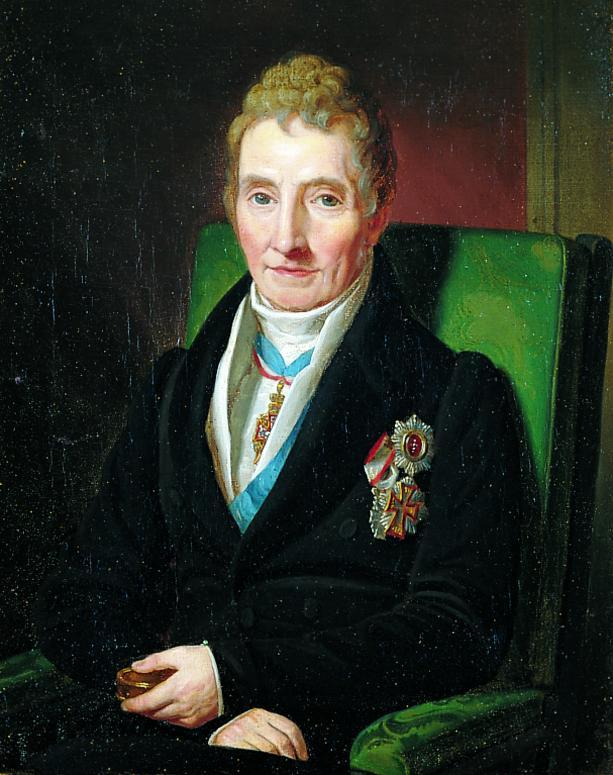
- Johan Sigismund von Mösting, portrayed by Emilius Ditlev Bærentzen (1830s)
- Born: 2 November 1759; Nygård, Møn
- Died: 16 September 1843 (aged 83); Frederiksberg, Copenhagen
- Resting place: Frederiksberg Ældre Kirkegård
- Education: University of Copenhagen
- Occupations: Civil servant, politician
- Known for: Danmarks Nationalbank; Møstings Hus
- Awards: Order of the Elephant

Johan Sigismund von Mösting (2 November 1759 – 16 September 1843) was a Danish banker and prime minister (geheimestatsminister). He was a key figure in the foundation of Bank of Denmark in 1818. His name is today also associated with Møstings Hus ("Møsting's House"), his former summer residence in Frederiksberg, Copenhagen, which is now used as an exhibition space.

== Early life and education ==
Johan Sigismund von Mösting was born at Nygård on the island of Møn. His father was Frederik Christian von Møsting who was governor of the island. Johan Sigismund von Mösting studied jurisprudence at University of Copenhagen, graduating in 1782.

== Career ==
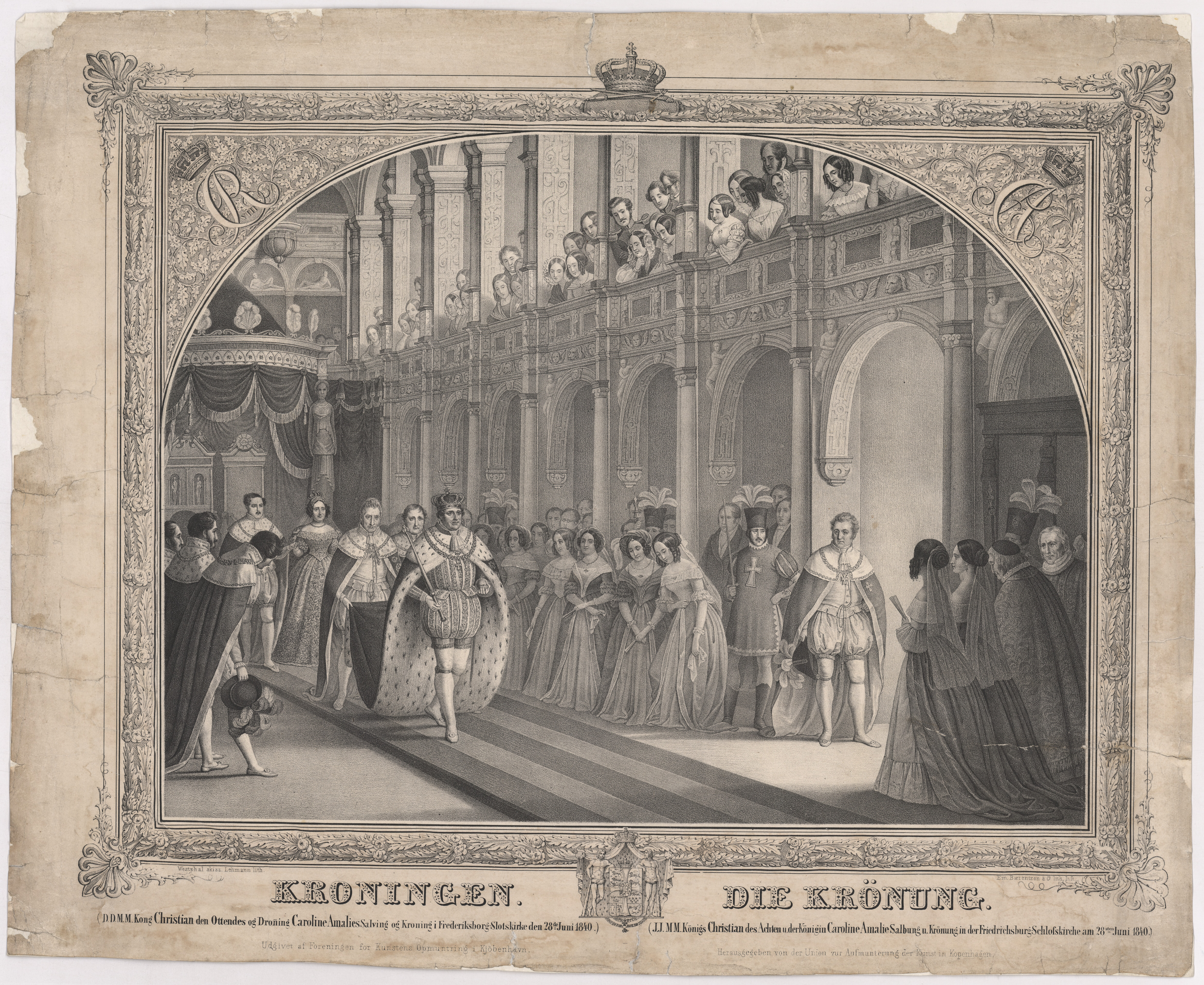
Møsting attending the coronation of Christian VIII in 1840.

1813 he became director of the Danish Reichsbank. He subsequently served as Denmark's minister of finance until 1831, president of the Chamber of Finance and Prime Minister of the Danish Kings. In 1838 he served as Director of the King's library.

== Astronomy ==
He helped promote interest in astronomy and was a significant figure in the founding of the scientific journal Astronomische Nachrichten. The Mösting crater on the Moon is named after him.

== Legacy ==
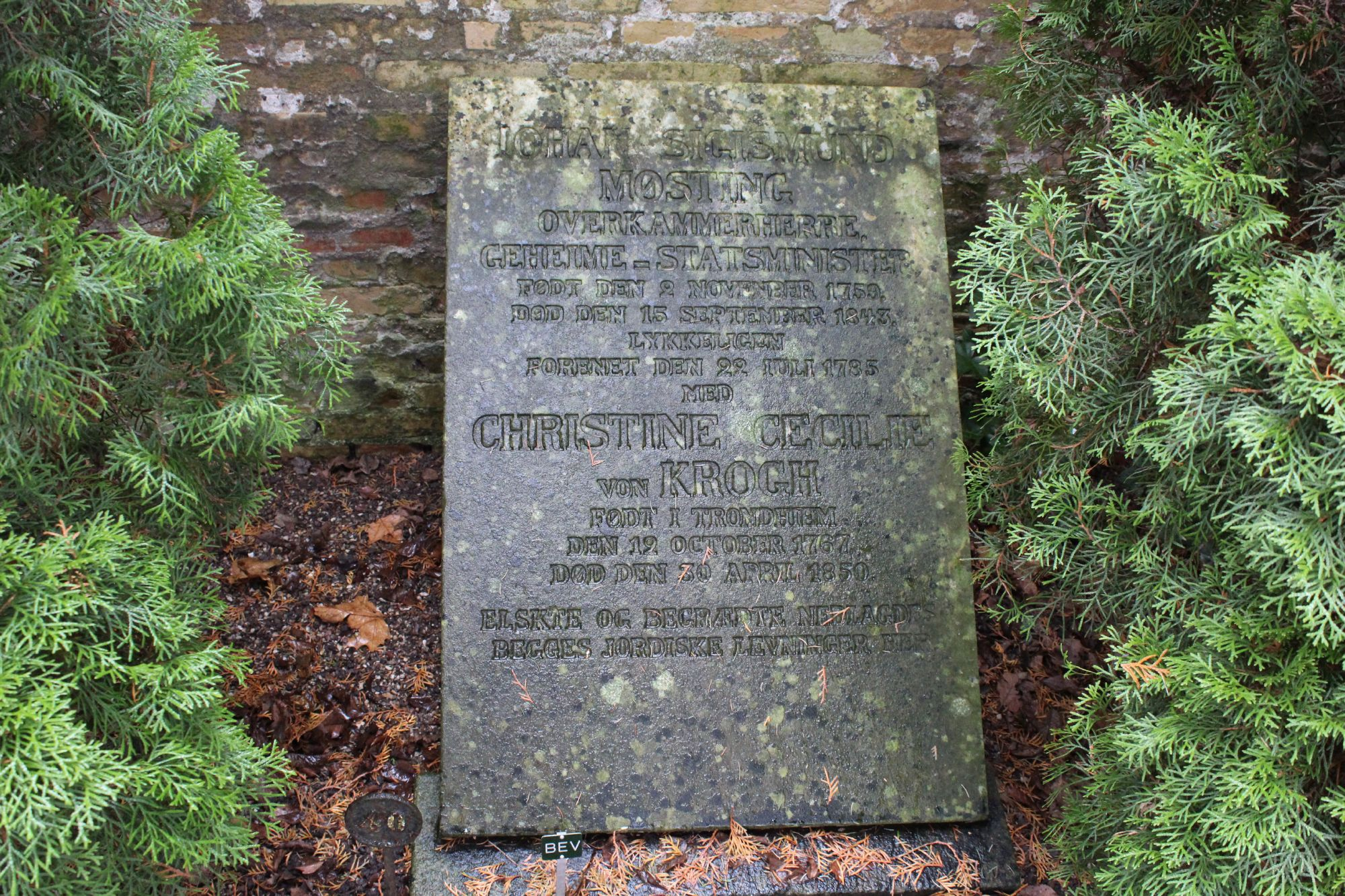
Møsting's tombstone at Frederiksberg Old Cemetery.

Møsting is buried at Frederiksberg Old Cemetery.

His former country house in Frederiksberg is now ioerated as an exhibition space under the name Møstings Hus (Møsting's House).

Cape Møsting in Greenland was named after him in 1829 by Lieutenant Wilhelm August Graah (1793–1863).

== See also ==
- Swedish Embassy, Copenhagen, where Møsting lived from 1814 to 1818
