= Sleipner Glacier =

Glacier in Greenland

- Sleipner Gletscher
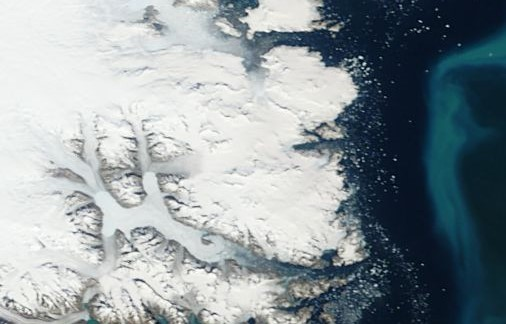
- Odinland NASA picture section with the Sleipner Glacier on the left side

- Location within Greenland
- Type: Piedmont glacier
- Location: Odinland, Greenland
- Coordinates: 63°53′N 41°25′W
- Length: 25 km (16 mi)
- Width: 4 km (2.5 mi)
- Terminus: Fimbul Glacier

Sleipner Glacier (Danish: Sleipner Gletscher), is a glacier in eastern Greenland.

This glacier was named after Sleipner, Odin's mythical eight-legged flying horse.

== Geography ==
The Sleipner Glacier originates in central Odinland, a heavily glaciated peninsula. It flows westward just west of Ensom Majestaet ('Lonely Majesty'), Odinland's highest point. The glacier is roughly east–west oriented and joins the left side of the Fimbul Glacier just north of its terminus in the Bernstorff Fjord (Kangertittivaq). Together the Sleipner and Fimbul glaciers produce massive amounts of ice that blocks the fjord.

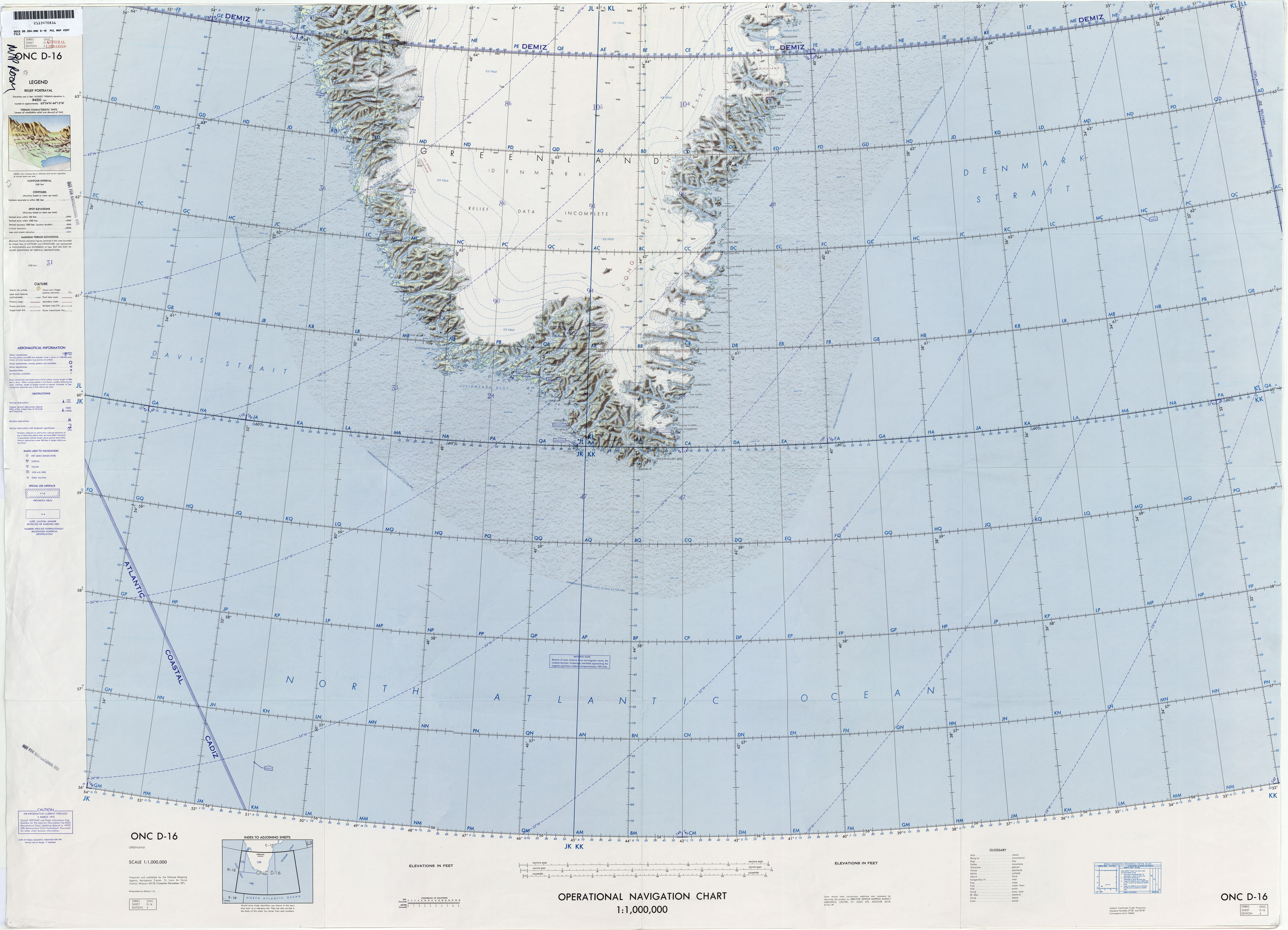
Map of part of Greenland section.

== Bibliography ==
- Climate-related glacier fluctuations in southeast Greenland

== See also ==
- List of glaciers in Greenland
