= Lonely Island (Sam Cooke song) =

Single by Sam Cooke

from the album Hit Kit
- A-side: "You Were Made for Me"
- Released: March 24, 1958
- Recorded: August 23, 1957; Radio Recorders (Los Angeles, California)
- Genre: Rhythm and blues, soul
- Length: 2:31
- Label: Keen
- Songwriter(s): Eden Ahbez
- Producer(s): Bumps Blackwell

Sam Cooke singles chronology
"That's All I Need to Know" (1958)	"Lonely Island" (1958)	"Stealing Kisses" (1958)

"Lonely Island" is a song by American singer-songwriter Sam Cooke, released on March 24, 1958 by Keen Records. The song peaked at number 10 on Billboard's Hot R&B Sides chart, and also charted within the top 30 of the Billboard Hot 100.

== Background ==
The emphasis of the recording session in which "Lonely Island" was cut was to record ballads. "The sound was pure pop, with the same antiseptic chorus to which [former label Specialty Records owner] Art [Rupe] had so vociferously objected, and whatever the pedigree of the material, or its limitations, Sam carried off the performance without a hint of hesitation, condescension, or awe," said biographer Peter Guralnick.

== Charts ==
Chart (1958)	Peak position
US Billboard Hot 100	26
US Hot R&B Sides (Billboard)	10
