= Smallegade =

Street in Frederiksberg Municipality, Denmark

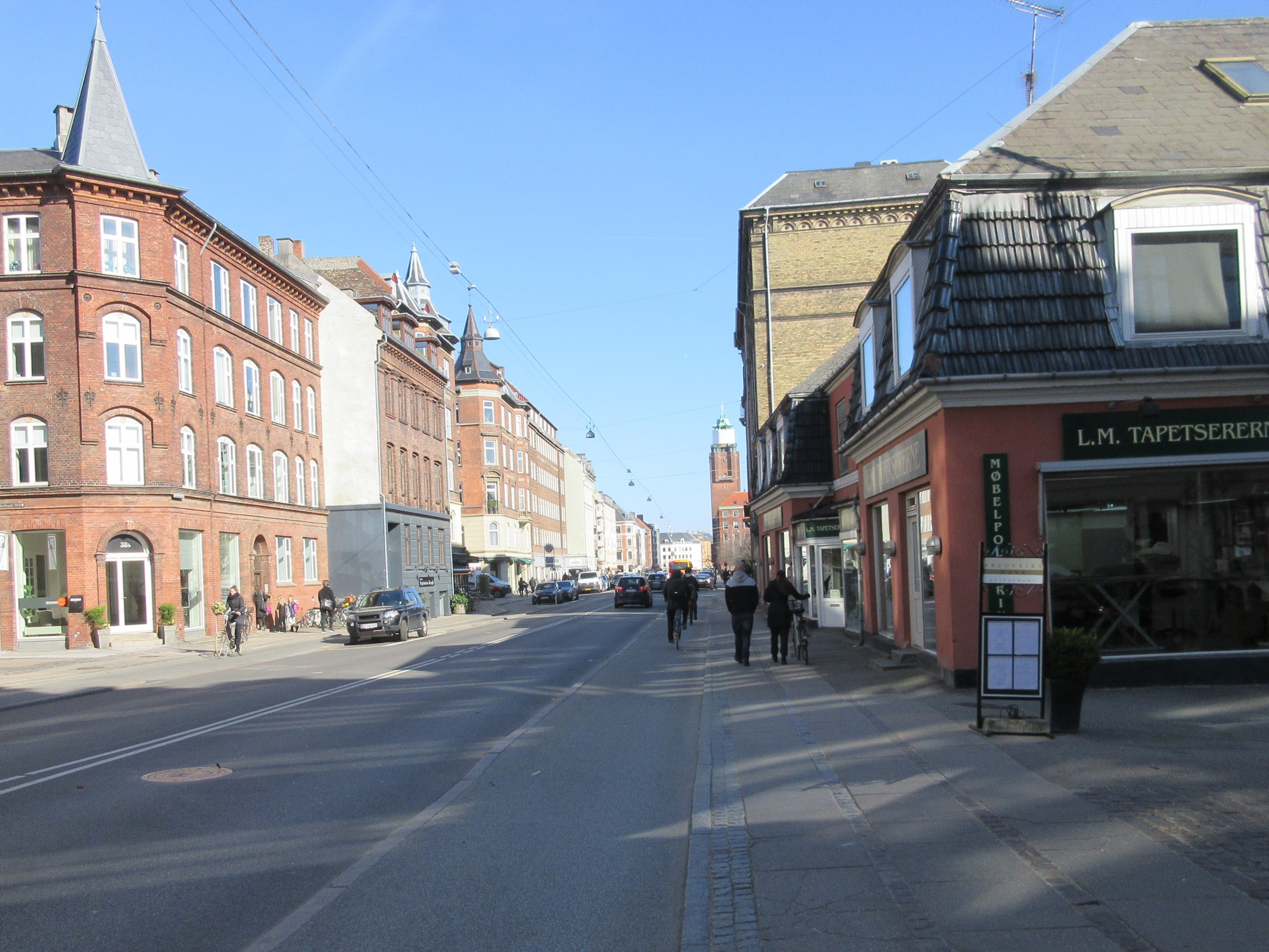
- Length: 750 m (2,460 ft)
- Location: Copenhagen, Denmark
- Quarter: Frederiksberg
- Postal code: 1619, 1859
- Nearest metro station: Frederiksberg, Fasanvej
- Coordinates: 55°40′44.76″N 12°31′38.28″E
- East end: Gammel Kongevej
- West end: Peter Bangs Vej

Smallegade (lit. "Narrow Street") is a busy shopping street in the central part of Frederiksberg in Copenhagen, Denmark. It runs from the Town Hall Square in the east to Fasanvej in the west, along the north side of Frederiksberg Town Hall and Frederiksberg Park, linking Gammel Kongevej with Peter Bangs Vej. On the other side of the Town Hall is Bredegade (literally "Broad Street"), now smaller than Smallegade, which after a while joins Smallegade at Møstings Hus, an 18th-century country house-turned-exhibitions space, which overlooks a small pond.

== History ==
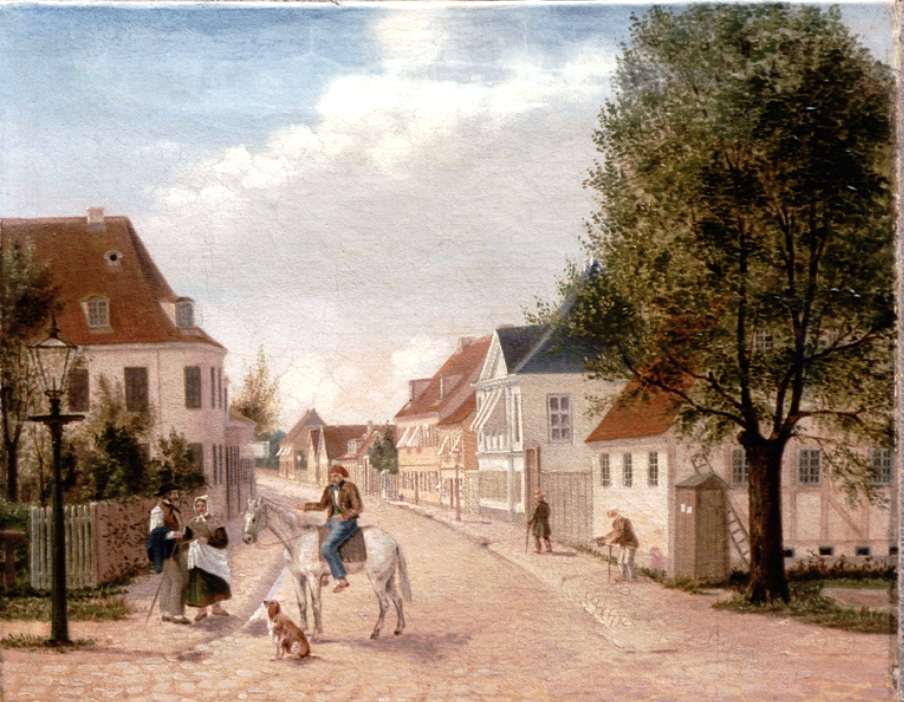
Smallegade viewed from Allégade in about 1800

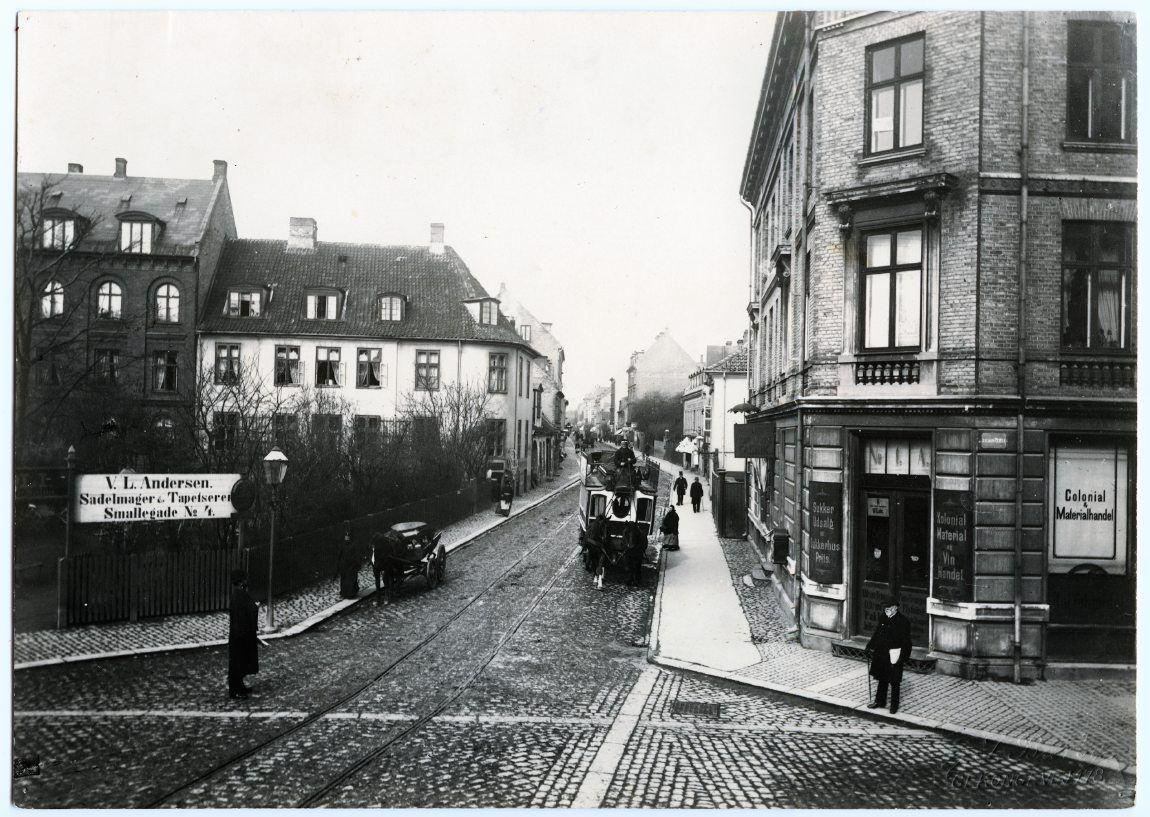
Smallegade seen from Falkoner Allé in c. 1890. The house to the left has not yet been demolished to make way for the new Town Hall.

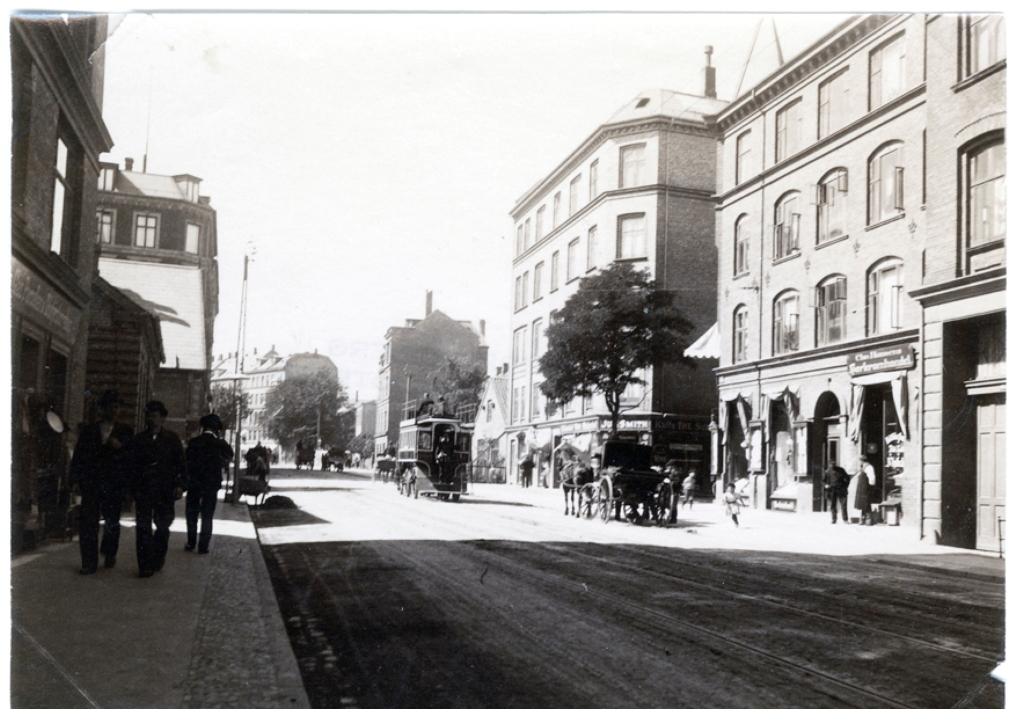
Smallegade in 1899

It is believed that Bredegade was the main street of Solbjerg, a village inhabited by Dutch farmers until the 1620s when it was shut down by Christian IV. Smallegade was also one of the original "Dutch" streets but more open than Bredegade, with fields on its north side in between the scattered buildings.

A brickyard was located at the far end of Smallegade until the 17th century. The Brickyard House (Teglværksgården) survived until 1890 when it was demolished. On a neighbouring site, Nobel opened a tobacco Factory in 1860. Eight years later that site was taken over by the faience manufactury Aluminia. They build a large factory complex where they were joined by the Royal Porcelain Manufactury in 184.

Before the Town Hall was built in the 1940s, its site was home to a neighbourhood with some 30 houses, many of which dated from the 18th century.

== Notable buildings and residents ==
The most distinctive building in Smallegade is Møstings Hus which is located on the other side of a small pond (Andebakkedammen, "Duck Stream Pond"), which is believed to be the former village pond in Medieval Solbjerg. The house was built in 1800 and for 27 years served as summer residence for J.S. Møsting. It was originally located on another site in Smallegade but dismantled in 1959 and rebuilt in its current location in 1976. It is now used as an exhibition space.

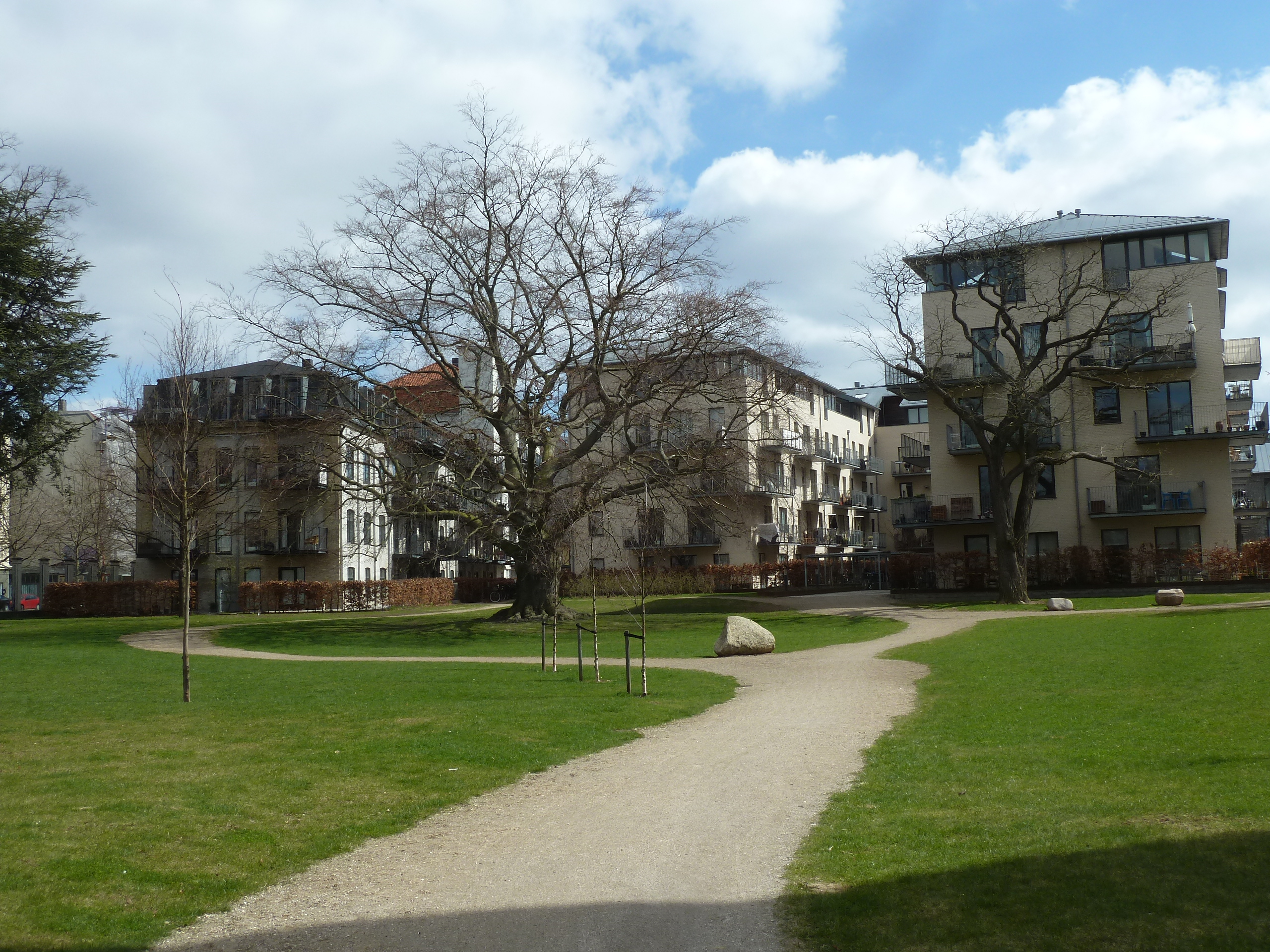
Porcelænshaven

Bredegade boasts some other examples of 18th-century country houses. No. 11 was built in the 1790s and was for a while owned by Prime Minister P.G. Bang. It is today used by the municipality. No. 13 was built in 1805 by master carpenter Boye Junge. The widow of Carl Hassager, a pastor, converted it into a hall of residence for ten students in 1897.

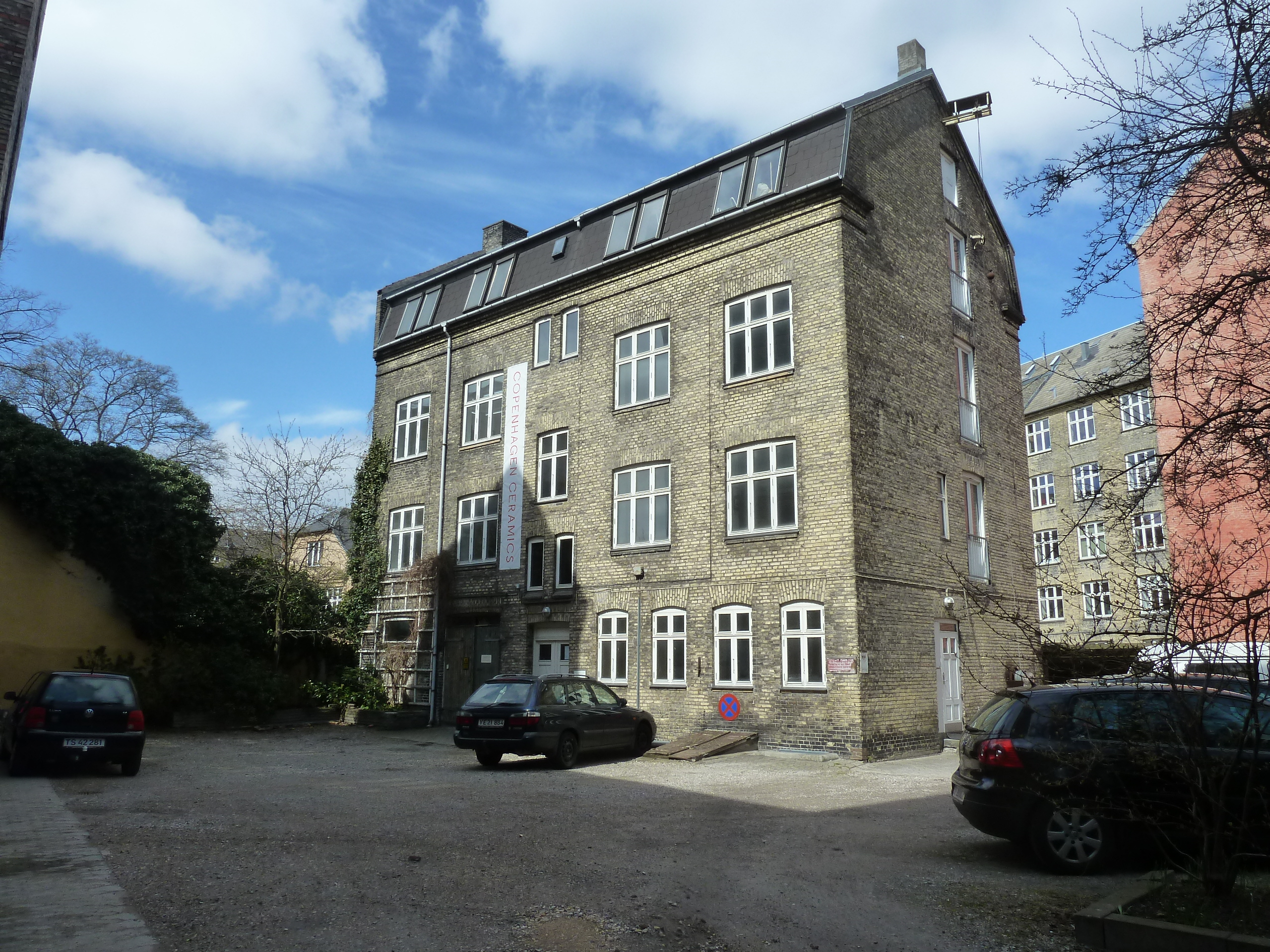
The building where Copenhagen Ceramics is based

Royal Copenhagen retired their production site in 2004. It has now been transformed into a mixed-use development, now known as Porcelænshaven (literally "Porcelain Garden"), which retains many of the original factory buildings, including a landmark chimney, which is visible from the street.

Copenhagen Ceramics at No. 46 is an exhibition space dedicated to temporary exhibitions of Danish ceramic art. It was opened by a group of artists in 2012 and is located in a courtyard away from the street.

== Transport ==
The first part of the street is served by the Frederiksberg Copenhagen Metro station. The far end of the street is served by Fasanvej metro station.

== Notable people ==
- Kjeld Petersen (1920–1962), actor, lived at No. 35 in 1958–1962

== Cultural references ==
In the first seasons of the TV2 sitcom Klovn, Casper (Casper Christensen) and Frank (Frank Hvam) work out of an office in the Rialto Building.

== See also ==
- Frederiksberg Allé
