= Møstings Hus =

Building in Frederiksberg Municipality, Denmark

Coordinates: 55°40′42″N 12°31′40″E

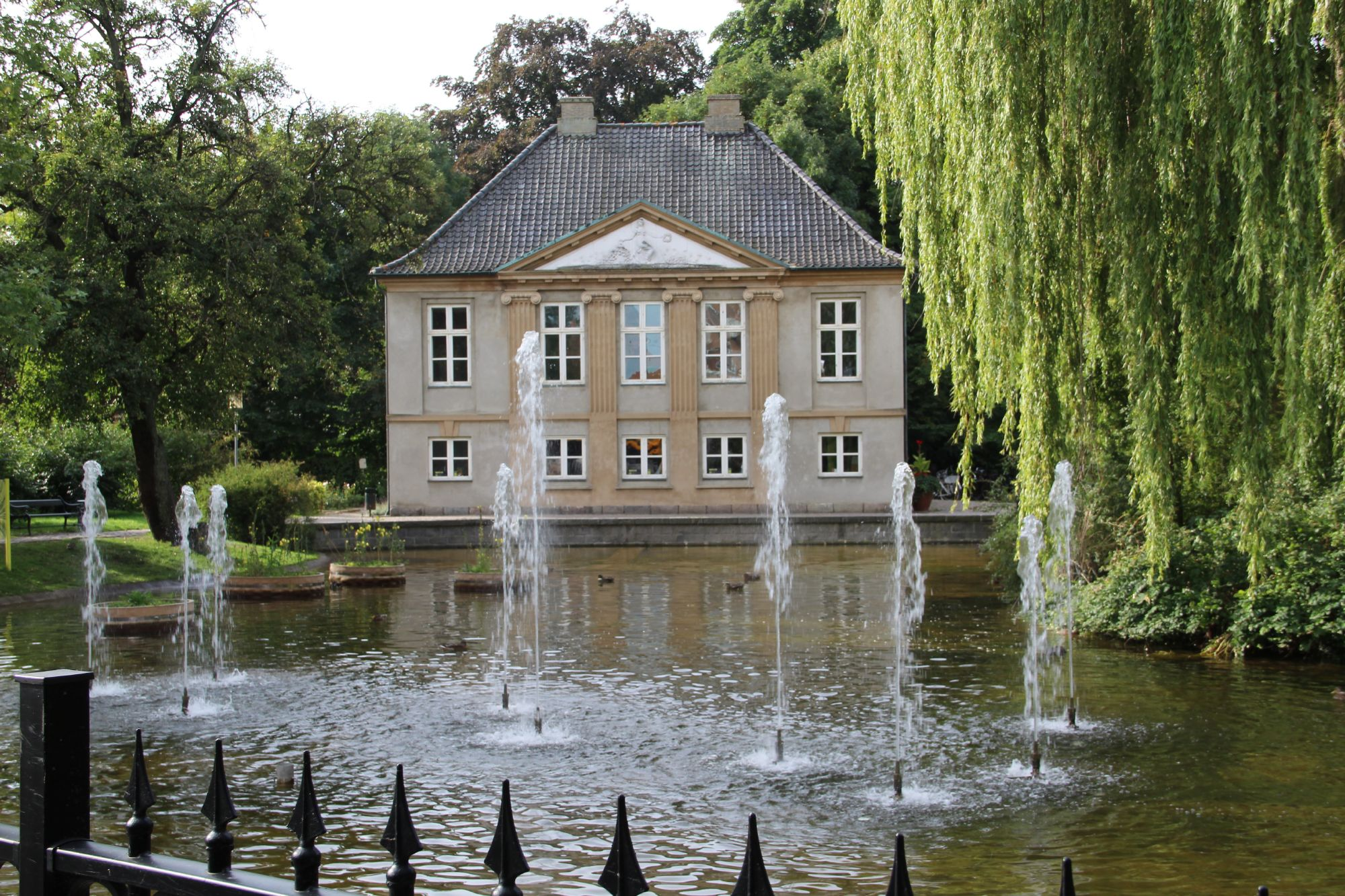
Møstings Hus

Møstings Hus (Møsting's House) is a small Neoclassical country house now used as an exhibition space in the Frederiksberg district of Copenhagen, Denmark. A pond lies in front of the building.

== History ==
=== 19th century ===
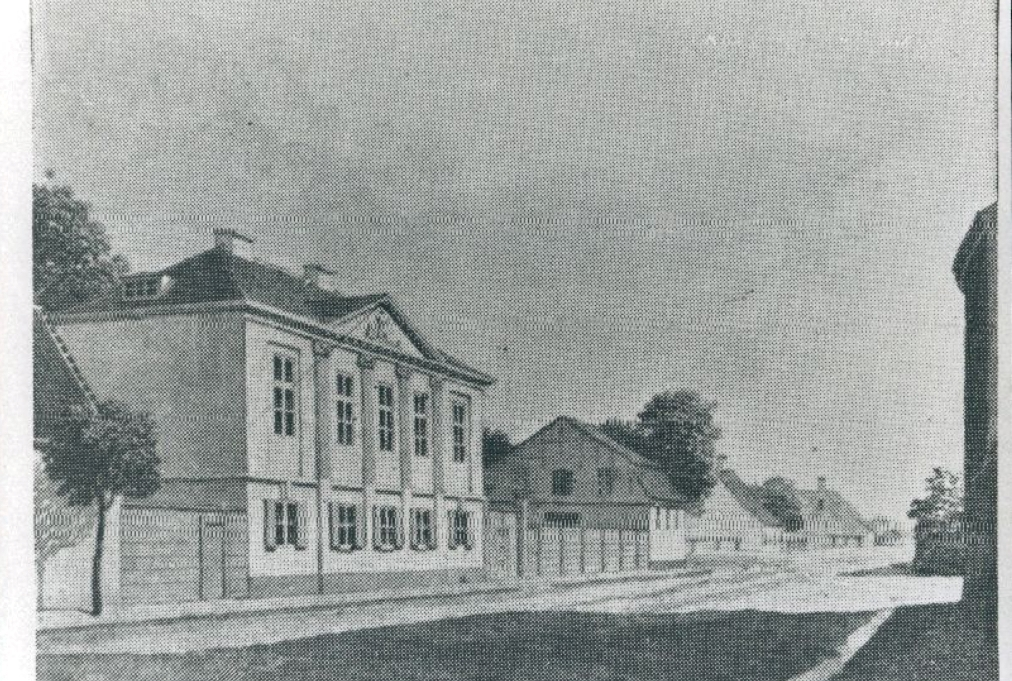
Møsting's House at its original location, 1850

Møsting's House dates from a time when Frederiksberg was the most popular place for wealthy Copenhageners to build their summer residences. The house was originally located at the corner of Smallegade and Falkoner Allé. It was constructed in 1800–01 for judge in Hof-og Stadsretten Ditlev Frederik Feddersen. The architect is not known.

In 1809, it was acquired by Johan Sigismund von Møsting, probably to a design by one of Caspar Frederik Harsdorff's students. Møsting succeeded Ernst von Schimmelmann in 1813 and was from 1814 he was a member of Gehejmestatsrådet. Møsting and his family spend their summers in the house until his death in 1843. In 1844, it was sold to decisor-general Georg Hermann Monrad.

=== 20th century ===
Most of the associated buildings were pulled down in 1901 while the main building was Class A listed following the adoption of the Danish Building Conservation Act in 1918. In 1924, Møsting's House was sold to a company that opened the Rialto Teatret cinema next to it on 1 October that year. In 1958, new owners obtained permission to dismantle Møsting's House to build a larger cinema complex. It was a precondition that the house would later be rebuilt in another location. This happened in 1977.

== Today ==
The building's new address is Andebakkesti 5. The pond in front of the building is the former village pond of Solbjerg. Next to the house is a somewhat similar building from the same period. It now serves as residence for the ephor of Hassagers Kollegium.

Møsting's House is today used as a venue for exhibitions, concerts and literary events.
