= Albrecht von Bernstorff (born 1890) =

German politician and diplomat

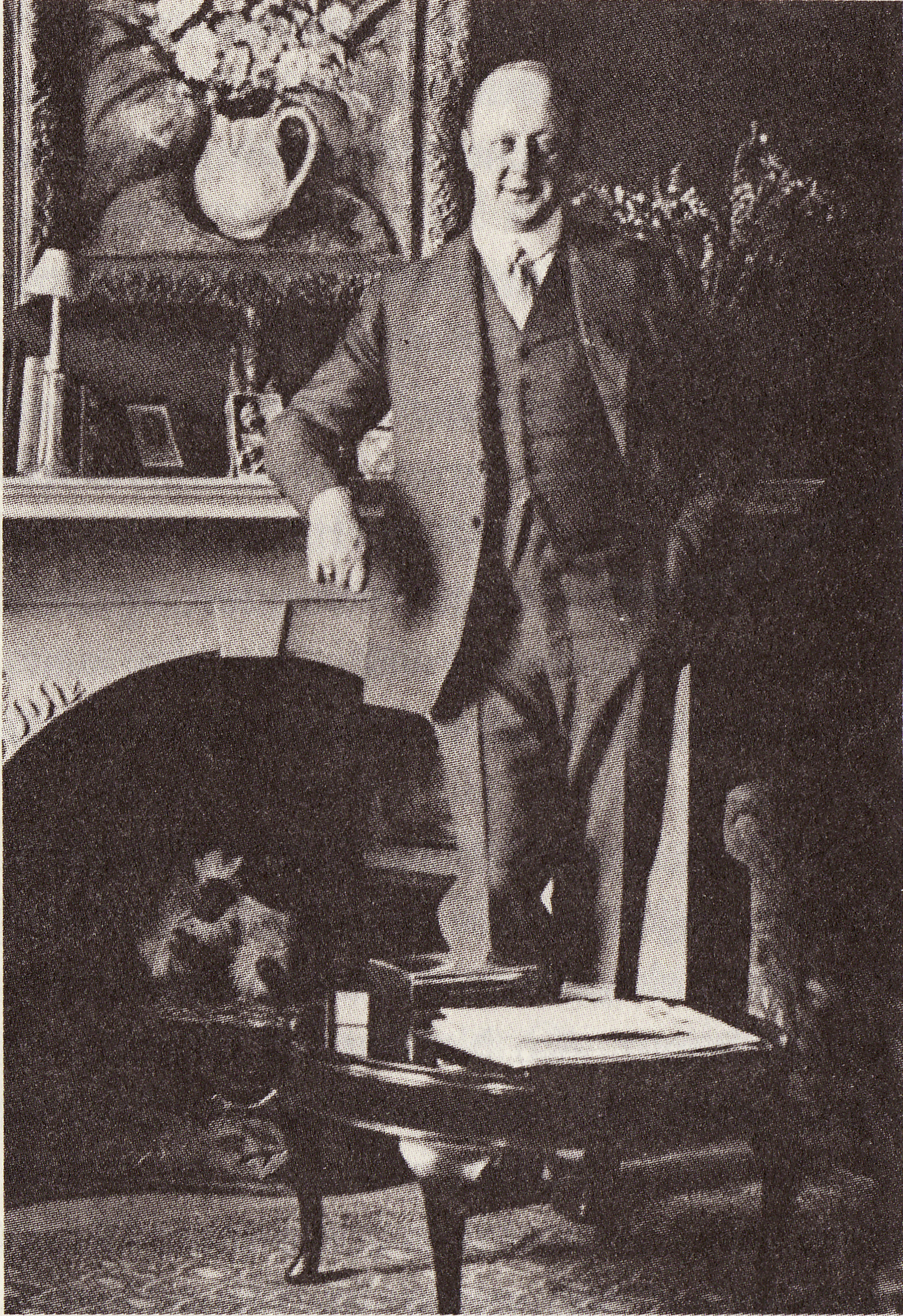
- Born: 6 March 1890; Berlin, Germany
- Died: 24 April 1945 (aged 55); Lehrterstraße Prison, Berlin
- Cause of death: Execution
- Occupation: Diplomat
- Known for: Opposing the Nazi government and taking part in the July 20th Plot
- Parent(s): Andreas von Bernstorff and Augusta von Hottinger

Albrecht Theodor Andreas Graf von Bernstorff (German pronunciation: [ˈalbʁɛçt ˈɡʁaːf fɔn ˈbɛʁnsˌtɔʁf], audio; 6 March 1890 – 24 April 1945) was a German diplomat and member of the resistance to Nazi Germany.

== Biography ==
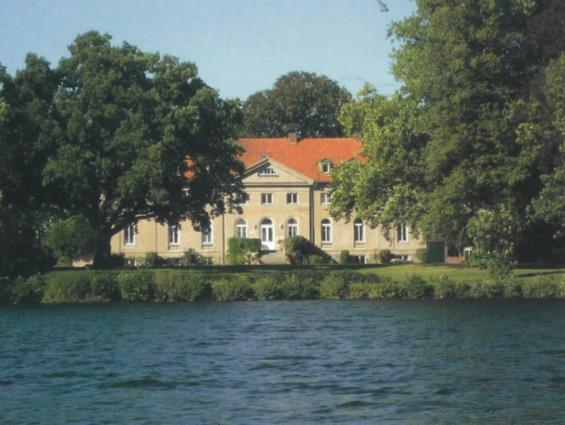
Bernstorff Residence in Stintenburg

Albrecht Bernstorff was the oldest of Andreas von Bernstorff's and Augusta von Hottinger's five children. The Bernstorff family was known for its eminent statesmen and diplomats. He grew up in Berlin and on the family estate in Stintenburg, and embarked upon a short agricultural apprenticeship before being chosen for a Rhodes Scholarship in 1909. When Bernstorff learned that his application for a Rhodes scholarship had been accepted; he abandoned his studies in agriculture, and enrolled on October 8, 1909, as a political economy student at Trinity College, Oxford where he studied until 1911. During his stay at Oxford, he co-founded the Hanover Club, an Anglo-German student debating society, and co-authored a small booklet containing advice for future German students.

The return from the United Kingdom was not easy for Bernstorff. He first enrolled in law at the Humboldt University of Berlin, but from October 1, 1911, he had to do his military service. He carried it out as a voluntary aspirant and chose the prestigious regiment of cuirassiers of the guard. After only six months, he was exempted due to his hay fever and his asthma attacks, due to an allergy to horse hair. Bernstorff never got involved in the army.

He completed his degree at Kiel University, following a short stint of voluntary military service.

After being admitted to diplomatic service in 1914, Bernstorff spent the next three years at the German Embassy in Vienna, from where he was recalled in 1917. He was later involved in the Inter-Allied Rhineland High Commission. He then took a one year leave from his diplomatic career to gain experience in the banking business, joining the bank Delbrück, Schickler & Co. in Berlin. Bernstorff worked at the German Embassy in London from 1923 to 1933 and was considered an important figure in British–German relations. He was forced into retirement for his open opposition to the Nazi government. After returning to Germany, he joined the Jewish bank A.E. Wassermann, which was engaged in transferring Jewish assets abroad. In 1940, he was sent to Dachau concentration camp but was released a few months later. Through Adam von Trott zu Solz, he had established relations with both the Solf Circle and the Kreisau Circle and used his wide range of contacts in Germany and abroad to help connect resistance members to influential circles which helped lay preparation for the 20 July plot.

After a second arrest in July 1943, Bernstorff was imprisoned at the Gestapo headquarters, then in February 1944 at the Ravensbrück concentration camp. In December 1944, he was transferred to Lehrter Strasse prison, in Berlin's Moabit district, where the Gestapo interrogated him under torture. At the end of April 1945, he was assassinated by the SS.
