= Skjoldungen =

Island in Greenland

Native name: Saqqisikuik
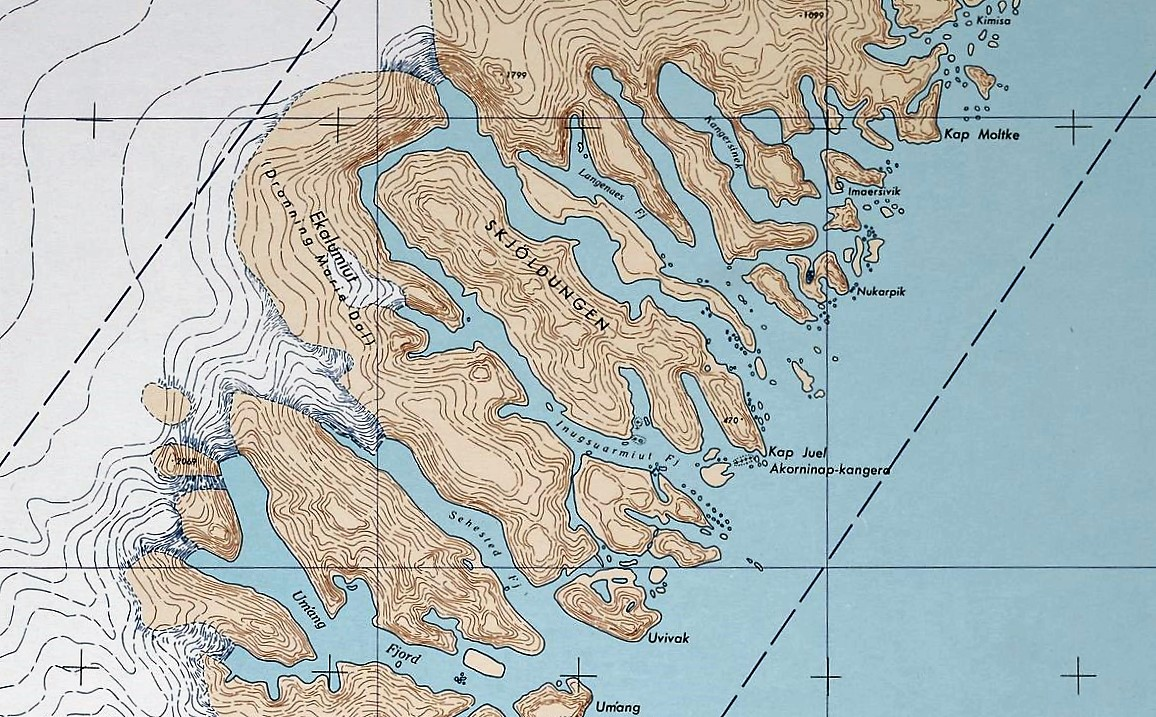
- Skjoldungen and adjacent fjords map section

- Location of Skjoldungen in Greenland
- Interactive map of Skjoldungen

Geography
- Location: Irminger Sea
- Coordinates: 63°19′N 41°30′W
- Adjacent to: North Atlantic Ocean
- Area: 450.3 km^{2} (173.9 sq mi)
- Area rank: 18th largest in Greenland
- Length: 49 km (30.4 mi)
- Width: 14 km (8.7 mi)
- Coastline: 158.8 km (98.67 mi)
- Highest elevation: 1,738 m (5702 ft)
- Highest point: Azimuthbjerg

Administration
- Greenland
- Municipality: Sermersooq

Demographics
- Population: 0 (2021)
- Pop. density: 0/km^{2} (0/sq mi)
- Ethnic groups: Inuit

Skjoldungen (Greenlandic: Saqqisikuik) is a large uninhabited island in the King Frederick VI Coast, southeastern Greenland. Administratively it is part of the Sermersooq municipality. The weather of the island is characterized by tundra climate.

The island was named by Wilhelm August Graah (1793–1863) after Skjoldungen or Skioldungen, a honorific title for the successors (Scyldings) of legendary King Skjold to the ancient Danish throne in Norse mythology.

== Geography ==
Skjoldungen is a coastal island in the southeastern shores of Greenland. It is located between two fjords, the Southern Skjoldungen Fjord (Greenlandic: Iittuarmiit), to the southwest, and the Northern Skjoldungen Fjord (Greenlandic: Qimutuluittiip Kangertiva) to the northeast between Skjoldungen and one of the arms of the Thorland Peninsula. The Morke Sound (Greenlandic: Pulaqqaviip Ikaasaa) is a 700 metres (2,297 feet) wide sound that joins both fjords in the NW, separating the island from the mainland.

The island stretches 49 kilometres (30 miles) in a NE/SW direction. Its highest point is Azimuthbjerg, a 1,738 m high ultra-prominent peak at the NW end of the island. Skjoldungen's maximum width is 14 kilometres (9 miles). Skjoldungen Island has a rugged terrain, which includes the Skjoldmøen, Bjarje and Hjalte glaciers and the Gedebukken, Pandebrasken, Skuren and Sfinksen nunataks. The southern part divides into two peninsulas jutting southeastwards, the Roar Peninsula (Danish: Roar Halvø) and the Helge Peninsula (Danish: Helges Halvø). Skjoldungen's southernmost headland is Cape Niels Juel, a narrow cape of reddish-brown rock at the end of the Helge Peninsula. 3.5 kilometres (2 miles) long Anarnitsoq island lies just to the west of the cape.

== History ==
Since the eastern coast of Greenland was inhabited by Paleo-Eskimo people around 4,000 years ago, the Skjoldungen Fjords were likely inhabited or visited by nomadic hunters. At the Qoornoq site, located on a small headland by the shore of the Southern Skjoldungen Fjord, there are archaeological remains of later historical periods. These include Thule culture graves indicating that Inuit lived on the island after the 13th century.

There are remains of relatively recent abandoned Inuit dwellings inside the fjord on Skjoldungen's western shore. These date back to 1938 when one hundred and fifty Inuit from Ammassalik were convinced by the Danish authorities to settle in this large island. During World War II a weather station was built and run by the Allies on Skjoldungen, as well as another one on Cape Adelaer further south down the coast at 61°50′N 42°5′W. The inhabitants of the Inuit settlement were relocated in 1965 following a nationwide program to concentrate the population of Greenland in a few larger towns. Another reason was that fishing and hunting were not enough to keep the population even close to a state of self-sufficiency.

Currently the island is a popular destination with tourists on cruise ships to Greenland owing to its impressive landscapes.

== See also ==
- List of islands of Greenland
- Finnsbu, a 1931 - 1933 Norwegian station in Skjoldungen District

== Bibliography ==
- Mette Felbo, Grønlandske sommertelte, Grønland, Årg. 41, nr. 1 (1993), p. 19-29
- Hans Christian Gulløv, Thulekulturen i Sydøstgrønland - set fra Skjoldungen, Forskning i Grønland, 1994, nr. 1/2, pp. 21–31
- Hans Christian Gulløv, Minik T. Rosing, Projekt Skjoldungen 1990-92 : baggrund og feltarbejde, Forskning i Grønland, 1994, nr. 1/2, pp. 8-12, on the 1992 ethnographic/archaeological expedition 'Projekt Skjoldungen'; background to the fieldwork
- Jette Lewinsky, Mosses of the Skjoldungen Area, Southeast Greenland, Lindbergia Vol. 1, No. 1/2 (1971), pp. 83-90
- Spencer Apollonio, Lands That Hold One Spellbound: A Story of East Greenland, 2008
- Hans Christian Gulløv, Archaeological Commentary on the Isotopic Study of the Greenland Thule Culture, Journal of the North Atlantic, Special Volume 3 (2012): 65–76
