= Irminger Sea =

Marginal sea of the North Atlantic Ocean

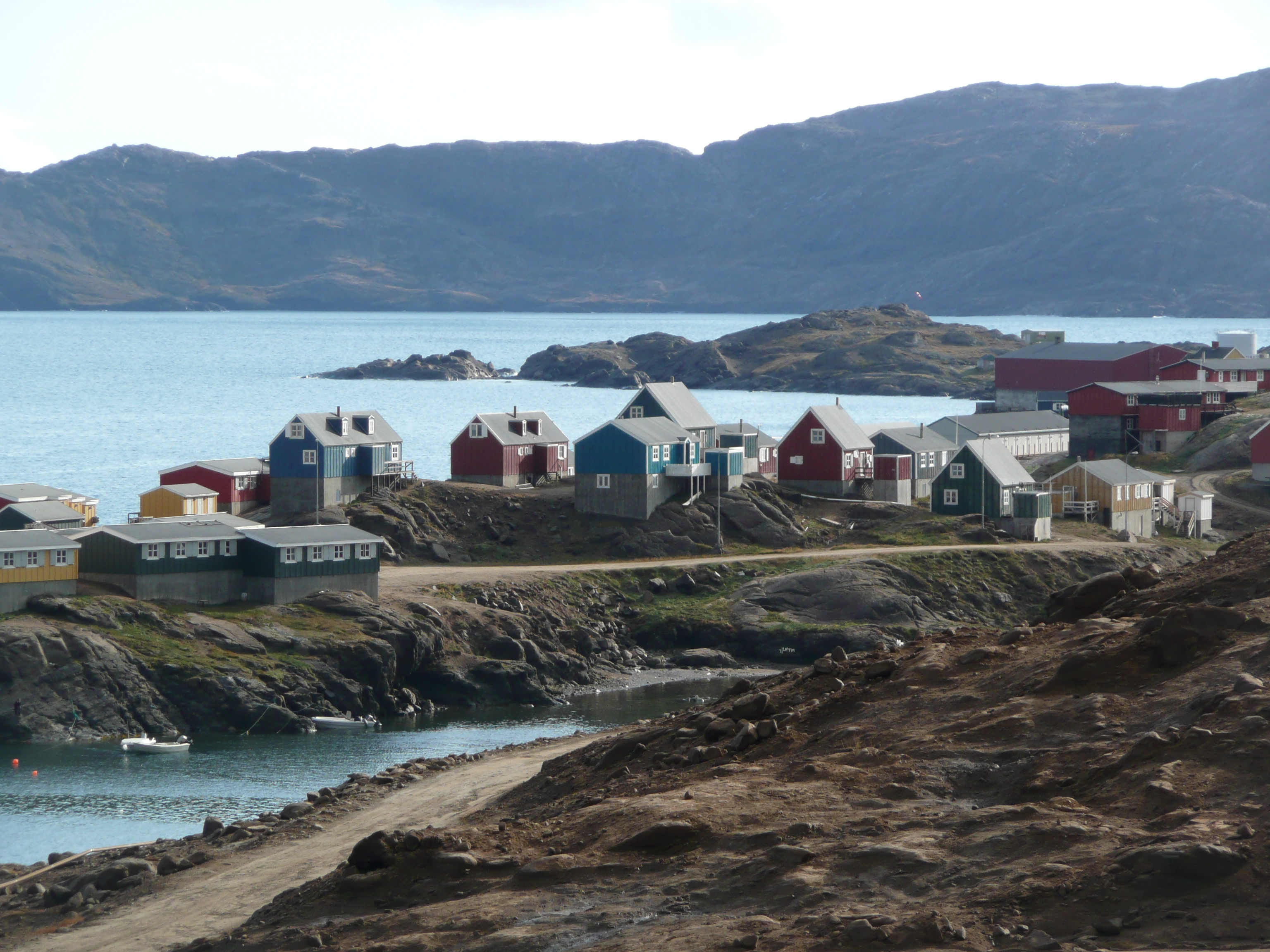
- The South East Greenland town of Tasiilaq is located on the coast of the Irminger Sea

- Location within Greenland
- Coordinates: 62°N 35°W
- Type: Sea
- Basin countries: Greenland and Iceland
- Max. length: 480 km (300 mi)
- Surface area: 300,000 sq mi (780,000 km^{2})

The Irminger Sea is a marginal sea of the North Atlantic Ocean. It is bordered to the west by southern Greenland, to the north by Iceland and the Denmark Strait, to the east by the Reykjanes Ridge (a northern part of the Mid-Atlantic Ridge), and to the south by open waters of the North Atlantic.

It was named after Danish vice-admiral Carl Ludvig Christian Irminger (1802–1888), after whom the Irminger Current was also named.

== Geography ==
The northern limit is the Greenland–Iceland Rise on the bottom of the Denmark Strait between Iceland and East Greenland, which connects to the Greenland Sea. To the southwest, it reaches to Cape Farvel, the southern tip of Greenland, and meets the Labrador Sea at this point. South of this point is the open North Atlantic Ocean. The sea floor of the Irminger Sea is largely part of the Irminger Basin, a northeastern continuation of the maximally 4,600 m (15,100 ft) deep Labrador Basin, which on the east is bordered by the Reykjanes Ridge. This delineation is oceanographic only and does not represent any official borders. The Irminger Sea is one of the main fishing areas of the Rose fish.

The Irminger Sea is 480 km (300 mi) long and 290 km (180 mi) wide at its narrowest.

== Whales ==
An area in the southern part of the Irminger Sea known as the Cape Farewell Ground was once considered a productive whaling ground. Endangered North Atlantic right whales (Eubalaena glacialis) continue to be found there sporadically.

== See also ==
- King Frederick VI Coast
- List of seas
