= Sun Glacier =

Glacier in Greenland

- Sun Gletscher
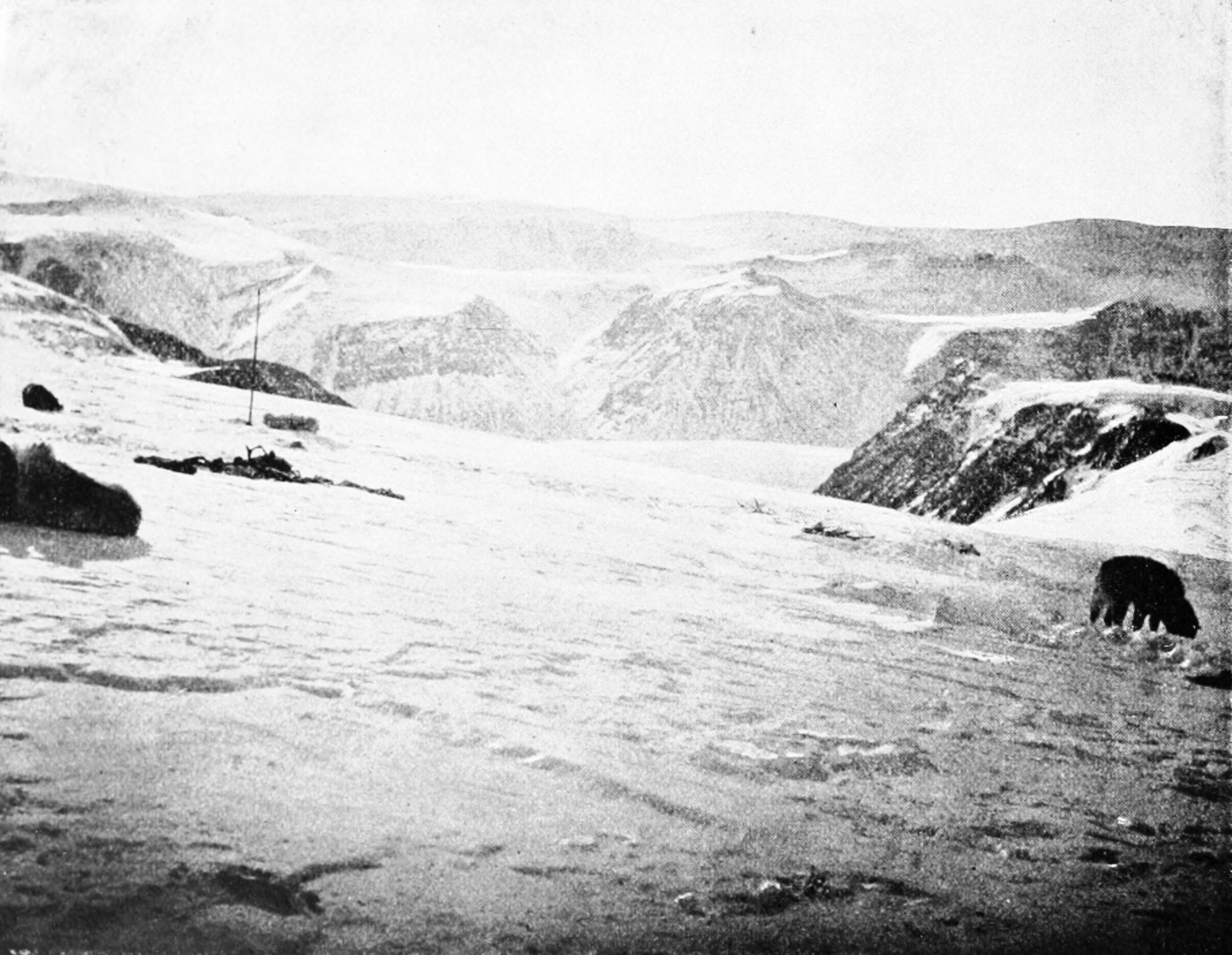
- View of the Sun Glacier with the MacCormick Fjord in the distance

- Location within Greenland
- Type: Tidal outlet glacier
- Location: Greenland
- Coordinates: 77°49′N 69°22′W
- Width: 5.5 km (3.4 mi)
- Terminus: MacCormick Fjord; Murchison Sound; Baffin Bay
- Status: Retreating

Sun Glacier (Danish: Sun Gletscher; old Greenlandic spelling: Iterdlagssûp Qíngua), is a glacier in northwestern Greenland. Administratively it belongs to the Avannaata municipality.

This glacier was named by Robert Peary. It was the subject of paintings by Frank Wilbert Stokes at the end of the 19th century. In a 1892 painting Stokes described the terminus of the glacier:

The foreground is that of the glacier. The green patches represent crevasses or cavities in the ice, which, in this case, are tilled with water from melting snows and ice. Looking down into them through the transparent waters one sees fairy-like grottos of beautiful and fantastic shapes. They are colored in many shades from deep indigo blue to the most delicate turquoise blue, and in greens of as many hues. The waters of the bay are dark green, while the cliffs, ice- covered, are in deep plum color.

== Geography ==
The Sun Glacier discharges from the Greenland Ice Sheet at the head of the MacCormick Fjord.

The glacier flows roughly from NNE to SSW.

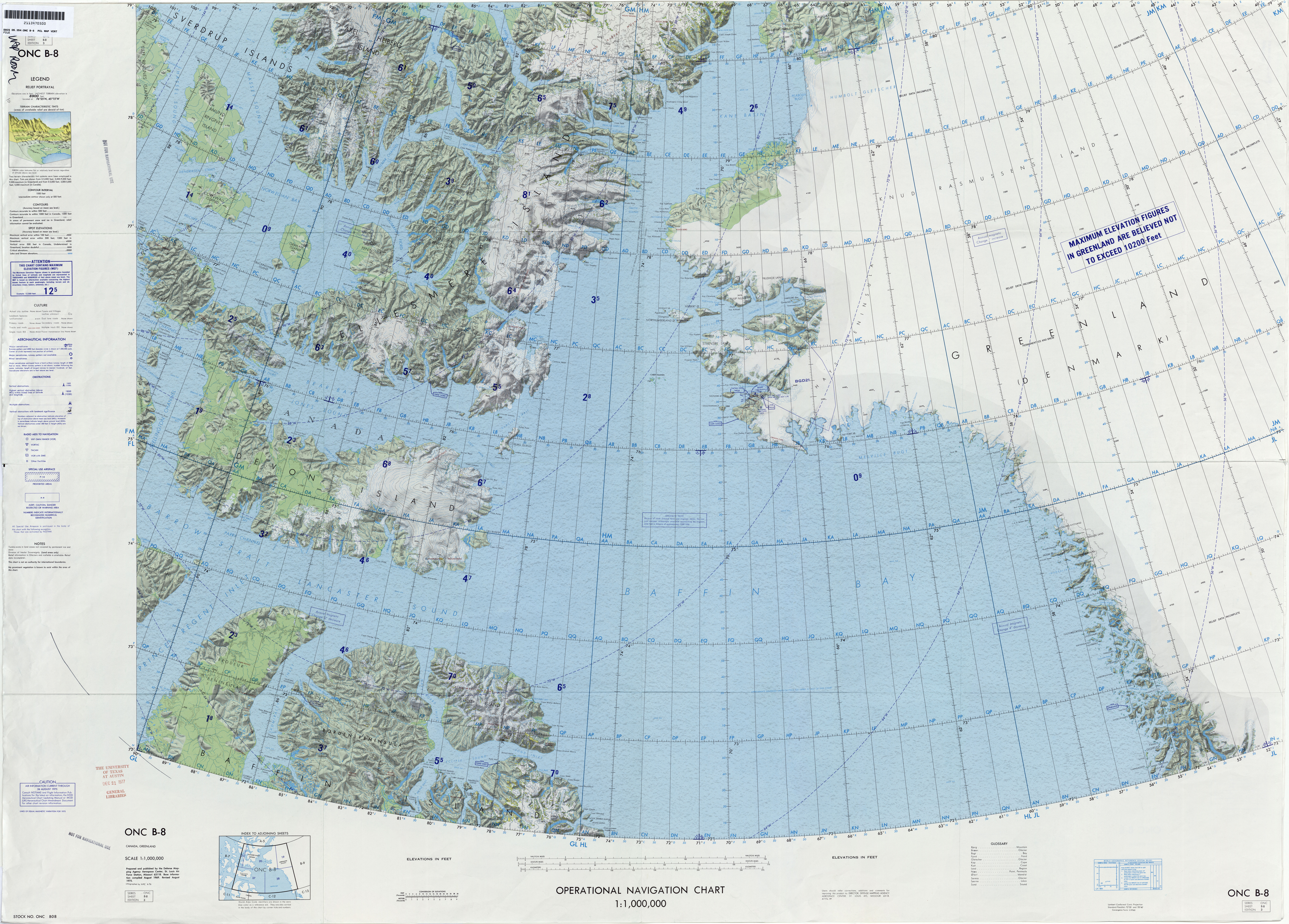
Map of Northwestern Greenland

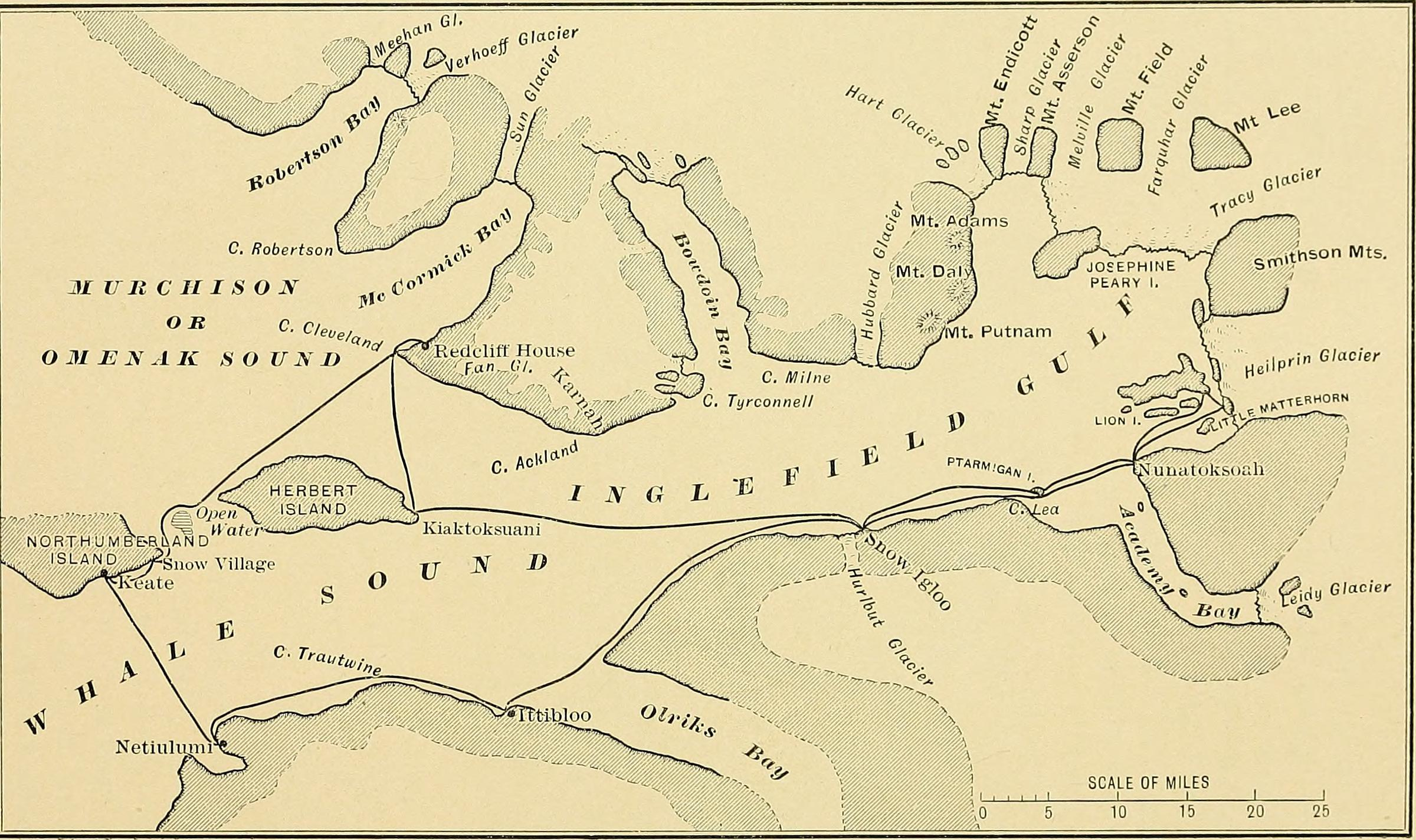
19th century map of the Inglefield Gulf.

== See also ==
- List of glaciers in Greenland
- Inglefield Fjord
