= SRK (disambiguation) =

SRK refers to Shah Rukh Khan (born 1965), an Indian actor in Hindi cinema.

SRK may also refer to:

- Sark, a Channel Island, Chapman code
- Central Association of the Finnish Associations of Peace, a religious body
- Siorapaluk Heliport (IATA code)
- Serudung language (ISO 639 code)
- Skills, Rules, Knowledge framework in ecological interface design
- Shaking rat Kawasaki, a strain of laboratory rat
- Soave-Redlich-Kwong, a thermodynamic equation of state
