= Hakluyt Island =

Island in Baffin Bay

Native name: Appasuak
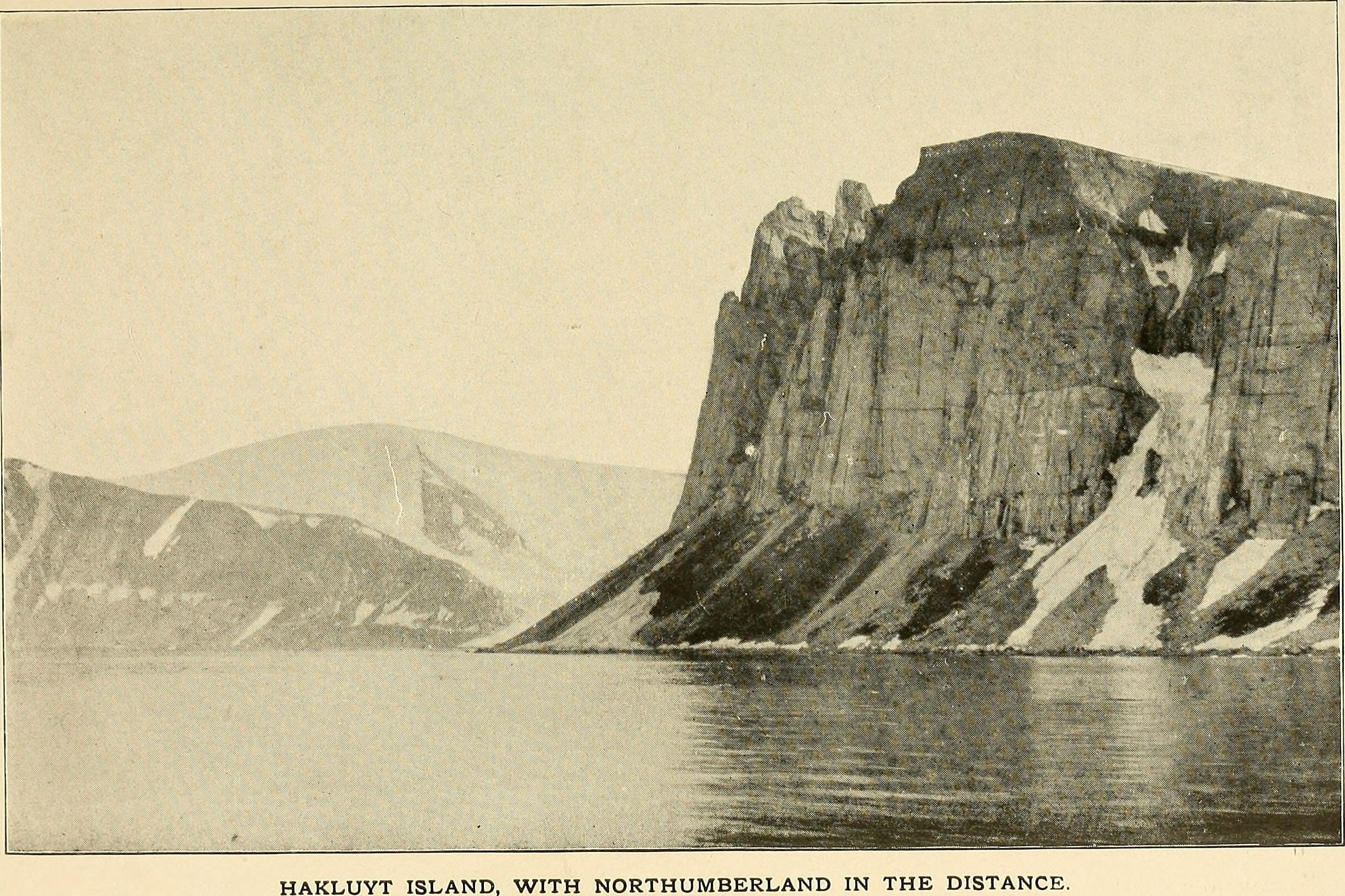
- Hakluyt Island with Kiatak (Northumberland Island) in the background

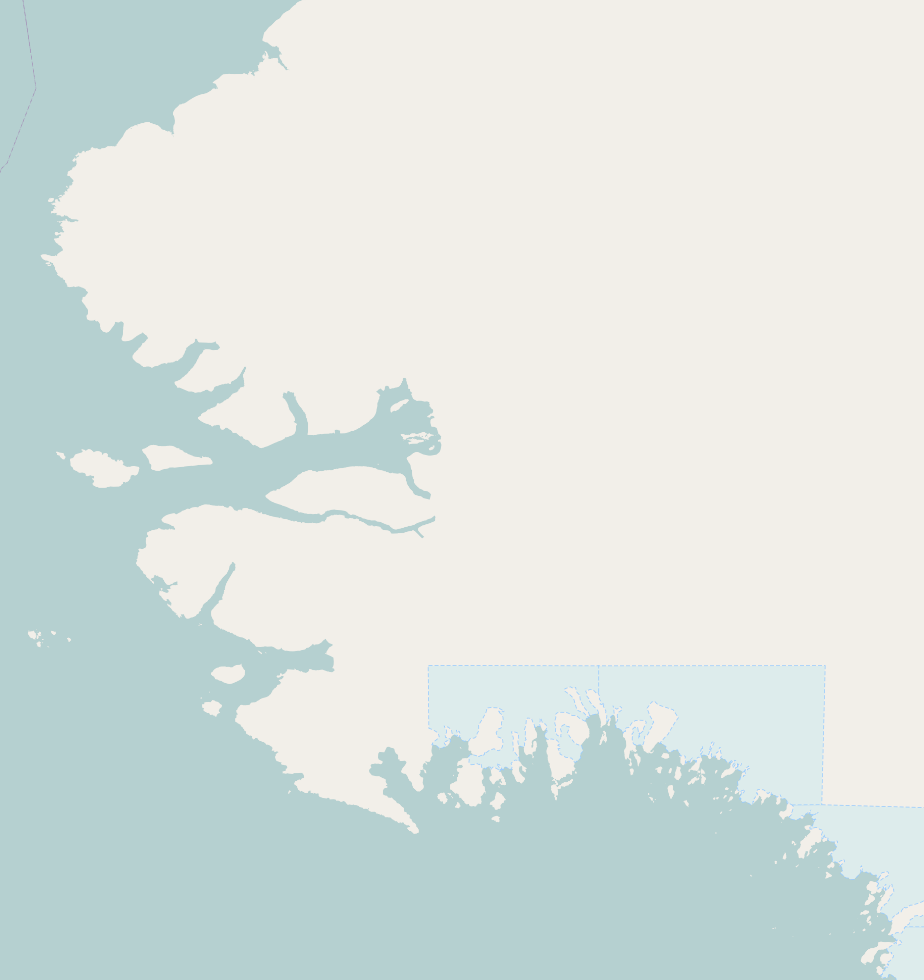
- Location of Hakluyt Island in Greenland Hakluyt Island (Greenland)
- Interactive map of Hakluyt Island

Geography
- Location: Baffin Bay, Greenland
- Coordinates: 77°23′N 71°56′W
- Area: 7 km^{2} (2.7 sq mi)
- Highest elevation: 430 m (1410 ft)
- Highest point: Nalungiussaq

Administration
- Greenland
- Municipality: Avannaata

Demographics
- Population: 0 (2023)
- Pop. density: 0/km^{2} (0/sq mi)
- Ethnic groups: none

Hakluyt Island (Greenlandic: Appasuak, Danish: Hakluyt Ø) is an island in Baffin Bay in northwest Greenland. The uninhabited island is located off the west coast of Northumberland Island, and is part of the Avannaata municipality. It is a designated Important Bird Area and a regional Key Biodiversity Area.

== Geography ==
Hakluyt Island lies in the Baffin Bay off the northwestern coast of Greenland to the west of Northumberland Island (Kiatak), and is part of the Avannaata municipality. Spread over an area of 7 km^{2} (2.7 sq mi), the island has a varying topography with an average elevation of 300 m (980 ft). It is part of a small group of coastal islands formed by Kiatak, Herbert Island and Hakluyt Island, and these islands lie off the Inglefield Fjord, between the Murchison Sound to the north and the Hvalsund to the south. The island is steeper towards the northeast while gently decreasing in altitude while moving towards the southwest. The island has various cliffs along the arctic coast, with the highest part of the island at 460 m (1,510 ft), located in the northeast corner. Due to the prevalent climatic patterns, there is no thick ice formation in the island. The island has no permanent population.

== Flora and fauna ==
The island is classified as an Important Bird Area (IBA) by Birdlife International, and a regional Key Biodiversity Area. It is classified as a marine/coastal habitat and is hosts seabird nesting sites. Major bird species found include thick-billed murre, black-legged kittiwake, little auk, razorbill, black guillemot, and common puffin. The island is home to nearly eighty percent of the breeding population of little auks in the world.

== See also ==
- List of islands of Greenland
