= Morris Jesup Glacier =

Glacier in Greenland

- Morris Jesup Gletscher; Neqip Sermia
- Location within Greenland
- Type: Tidal outlet glacier
- Location: Greenland
- Coordinates: 77°56′N 70°54′W
- Width: 3 km (1.9 mi)
- Terminus: Unnamed fjord Murchison Sound; Baffin Bay
- Status: Retreating

Morris Jesup Glacier (Danish: Morris Jesup Gletscher, Greenlandic: Neqip Sermia) is a glacier in northwestern Greenland. Administratively it belongs to the Avannaata municipality.

This glacier was named by Robert Peary after American industrialist-philanthropist Morris K. Jesup, president of the Peary Arctic Club, who helped finance Peary's expeditions.

== Geography ==
The Morris Jesup Glacier discharges from the Greenland Ice Sheet at the head of an unnamed fjord located just to the north of Cape Robertson in the Smith Sound area. The glacier flows roughly from NE to SW. The Diebitsch Glacier (Arfalluarfiup Sermia) located to the northwest, beyond Cape Saumarez, and Siorapaluup Kangerlua to the southeast, around Cape Robertson. Neqi, a former Inughuit settlement abandoned in the 1960s, lies directly at Cape Saumarez (Neqip Nuaa).

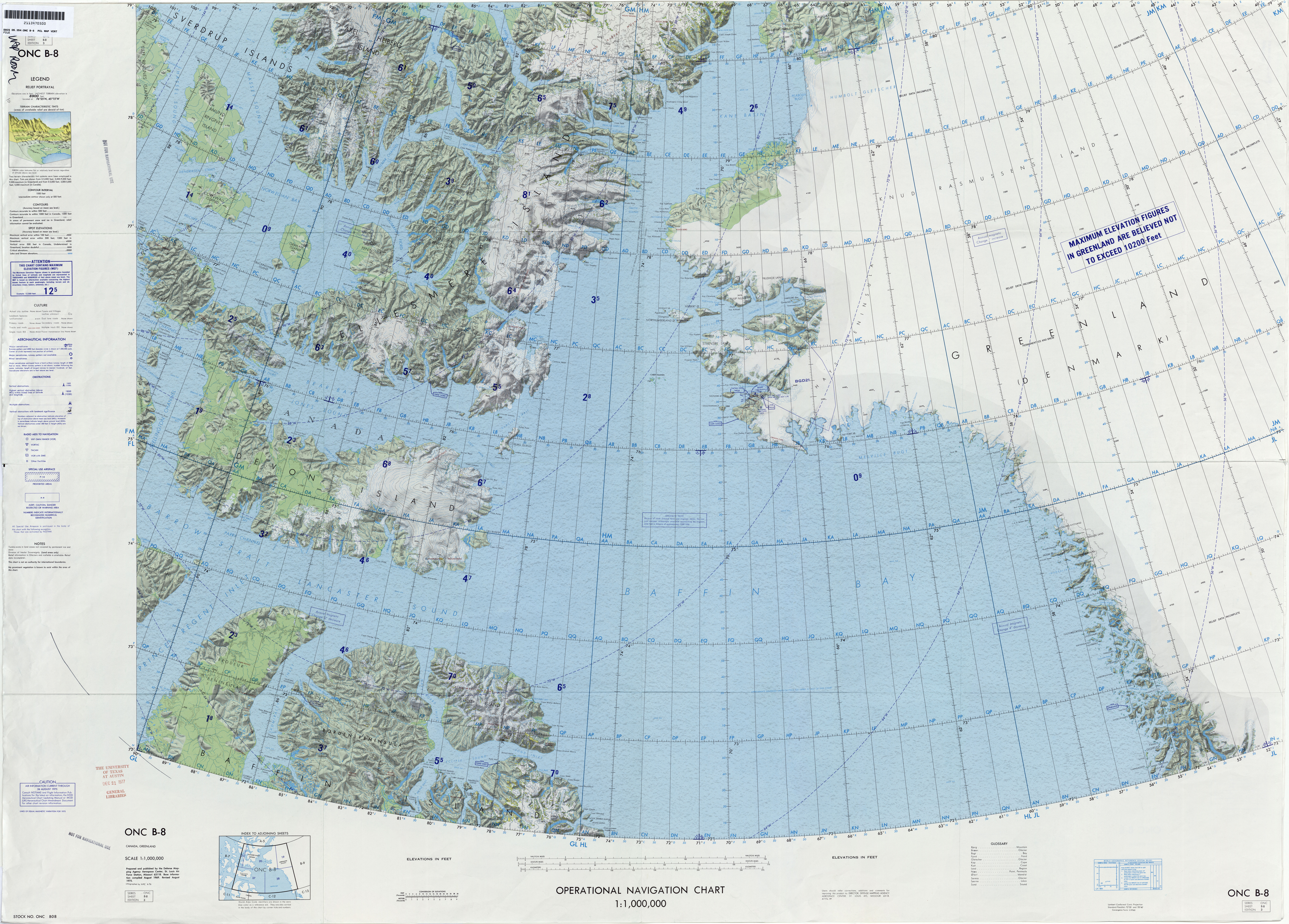
Map of Northwestern Greenland

== See also ==
- List of glaciers in Greenland
