= Bowdoin Glacier =

Glacier in northwestern Greenland

- Bowdoin Gletscher
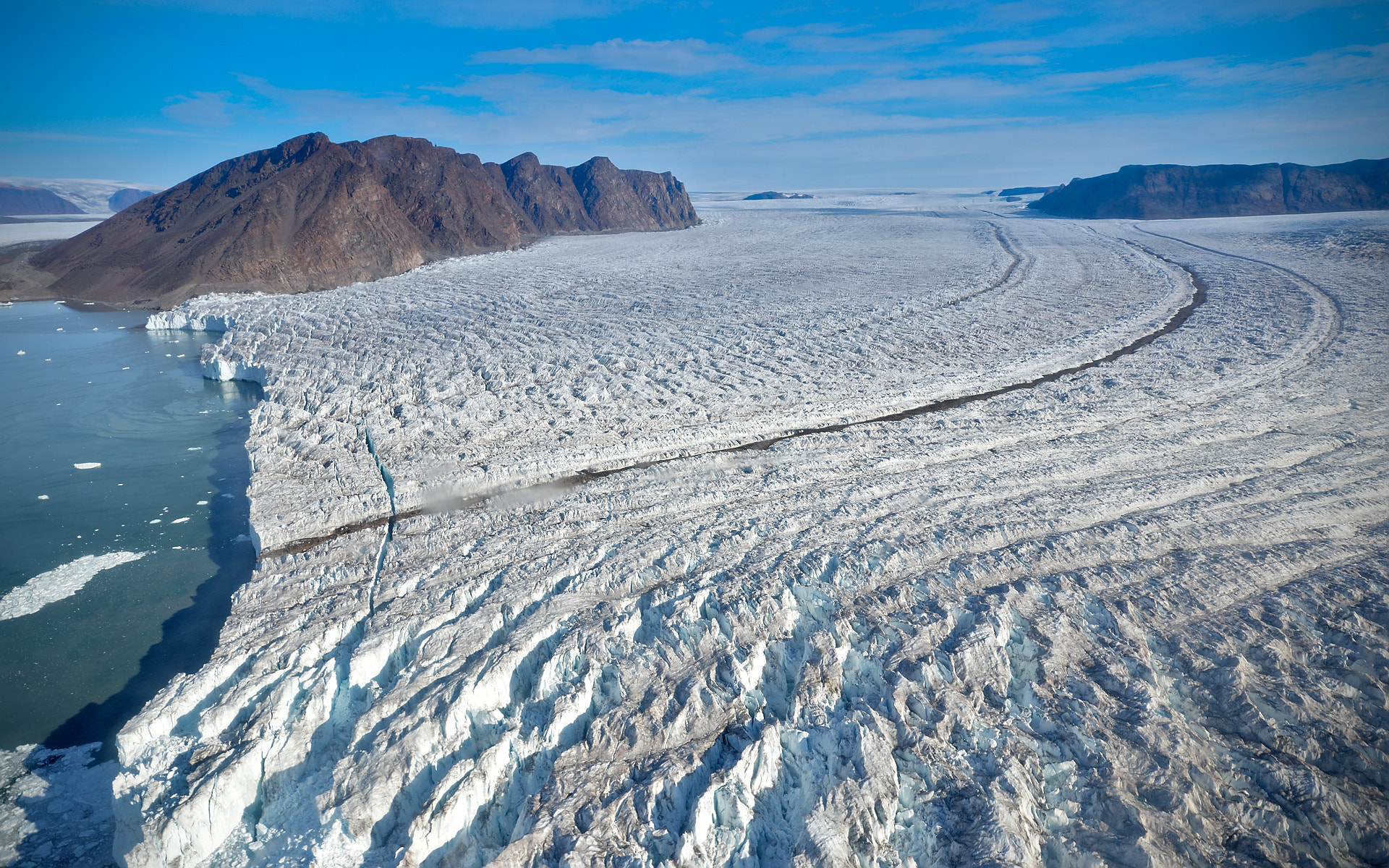
- View of the Bowdoin Glacier

- Location within Greenland
- Type: Tidal outlet glacier
- Location: Greenland
- Coordinates: 77°43′N 68°32′W
- Width: 3 km (1.9 mi)
- Terminus: Bowdoin Fjord; Inglefield Fjord; Baffin Bay
- Status: Retreating

Bowdoin Glacier (Danish: Bowdoin Gletscher or Bowdoin Brae, Greenlandic: Kangerluarsuup Sermia), is a glacier in northwestern Greenland. Administratively it belongs to the Avannaata municipality.

Like the fjord further south, this glacier was named by Robert Peary after Bowdoin College. He described the glacier as follows:

Beyond that, an isolated mountain of striking boldness and sharpness of outline jutted into the air apparently some two thousand feet, and then, from its base, the crystal wall of a great glacier stretched clear across the opposite side of the bay head. This glacier I named, in honour of my Alma Mater, Bowdoin Glacier, and the bay I called Bowdoin Bay.

== Geography ==
The Bowdoin Glacier discharges at the head of the Bowdoin Fjord from the Greenland Ice Sheet in the central region of Prudhoe Land.

The glacier flows roughly from NE to SW.

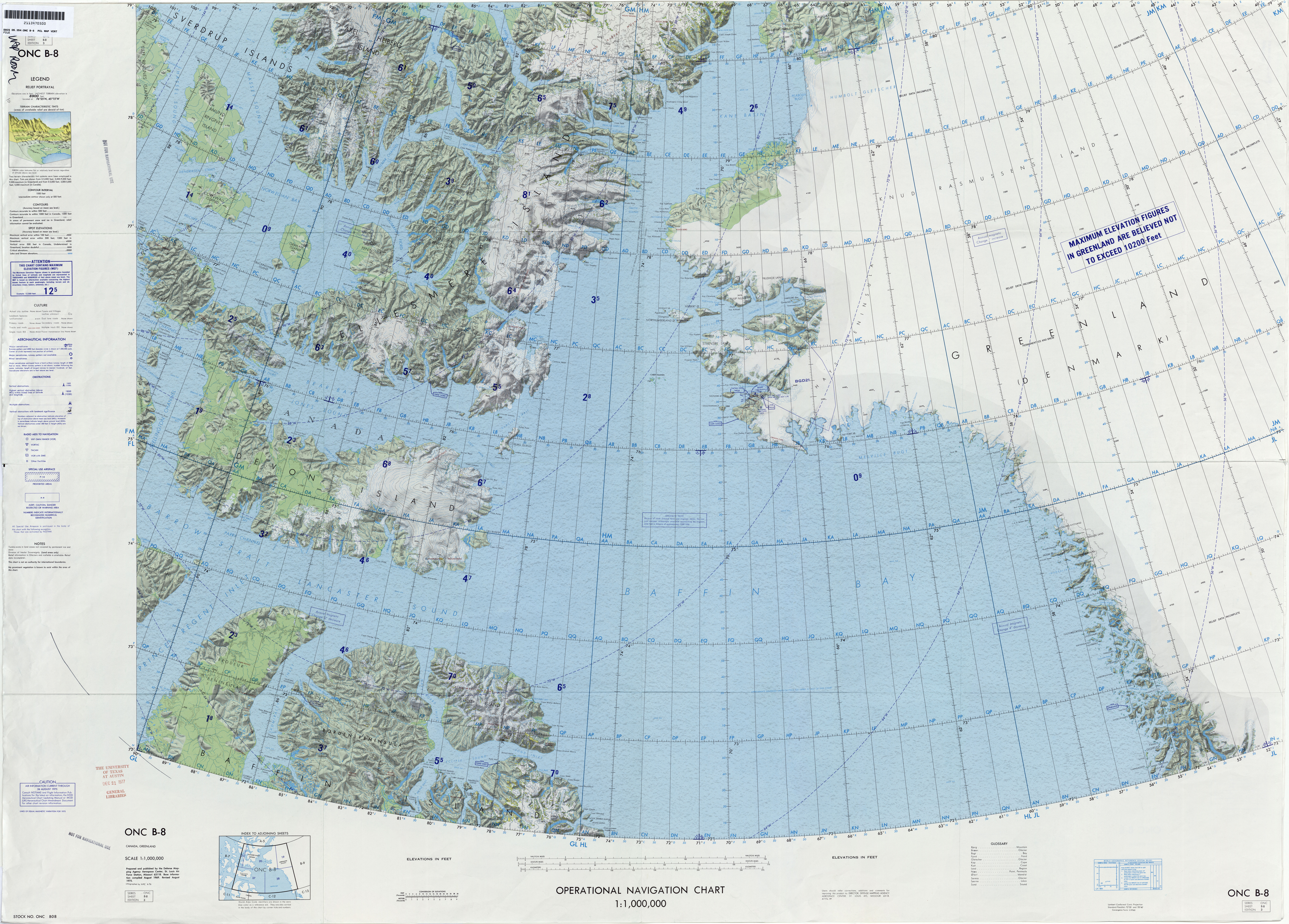
Map of Northwestern Greenland

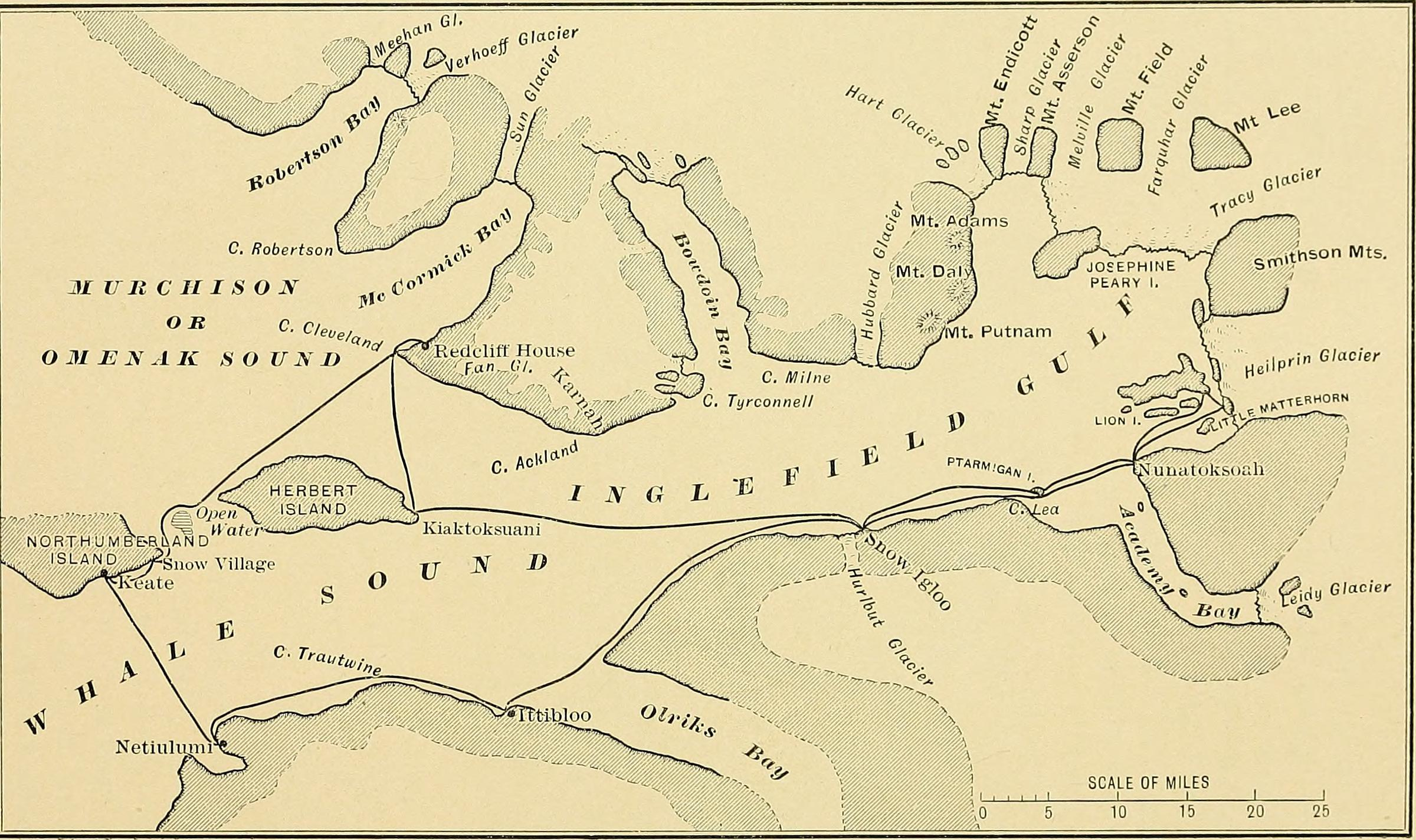
19th century map of the Inglefield Gulf.

== See also ==
- List of glaciers in Greenland
