= Bowdoin Fjord =

Fjord in northern Greenland

- Bowdoin Bay
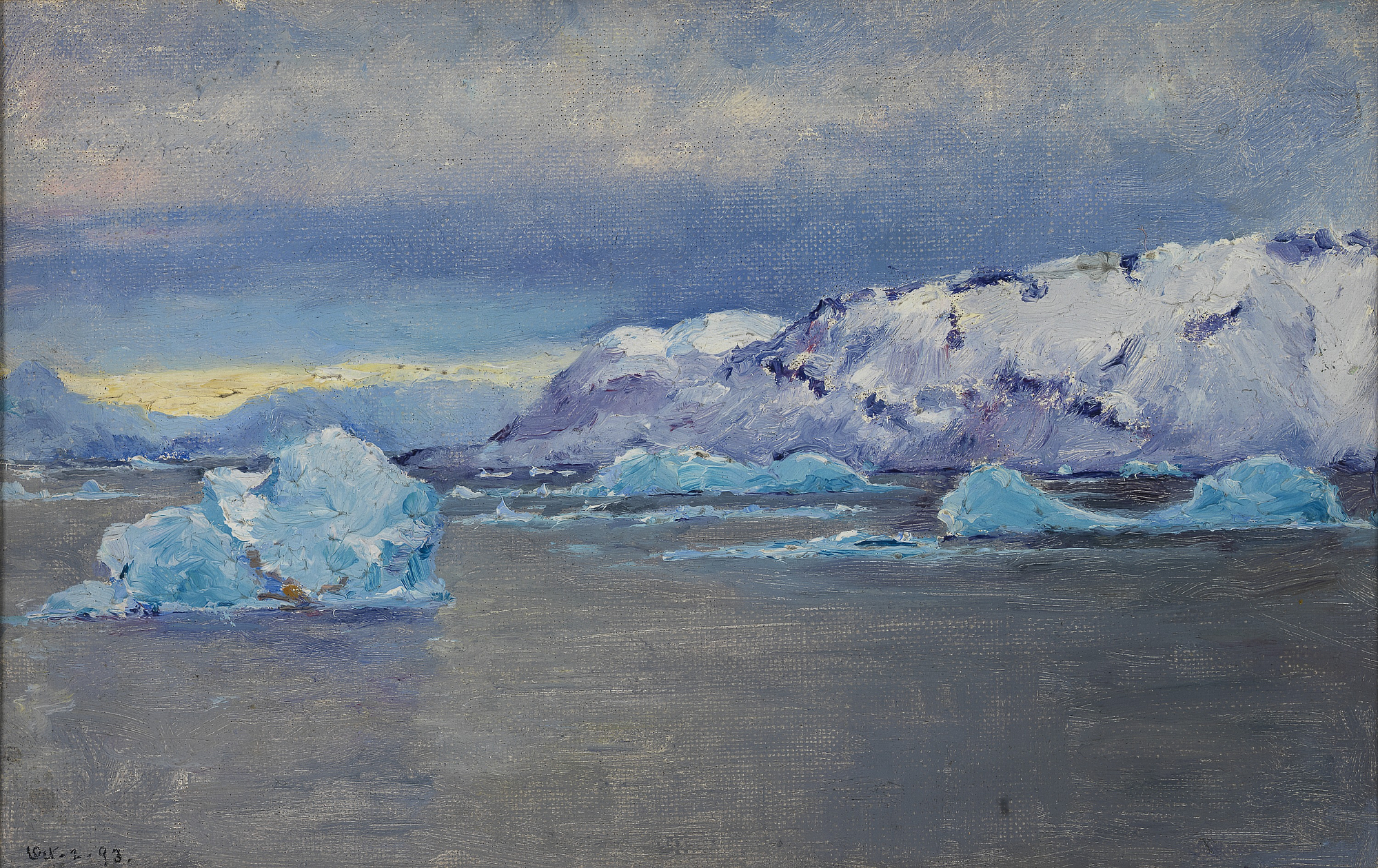
- South Point, Bowdoin Bay. Painting by Frank Wilbert Stokes (1858 - 1955)

- Location in Greenland
- Location: Arctic
- Coordinates: 77°35′N 68°31′W
- Ocean/sea sources: Inglefield Gulf; Baffin Bay
- Basin countries: Greenland
- Max. length: 22 km (14 mi)
- Max. width: 5.5 km (3.4 mi)

Bowdoin Fjord is a fjord in northern Greenland. To the south the fjord opens into the Inglefield Gulf of the Baffin Bay.

This fjord was named by Robert Peary after his alma mater, Bowdoin College. It was the subject of paintings by Frank Wilbert Stokes at the end of the 19th century.

== Geography ==
Bowdoin Fjord runs in a roughly north–south direction with its mouth west of Cape Milne and 15 km west of Cape Ackland, in the northern shore of the middle reaches of the Inglefield Gulf. Prudhoe Land surrounds the fjord to the west, north and east. Piulip Nunaa is the peninsula that separates this fjord from MacCormick Fjord to the west and northwest; Bowdoin Fjord forms its eastern coastline, part of Prudhoe Land. There is an abandoned Inughuit settlement (Kangerluarsuk) on the western shore of the fjord roughly 3 km north of Cape Tyrconnel, which was abandoned in the 1960s.

The Bowdoin Glacier discharges from the Greenland Ice Sheet at the head of the Bowdoin Fjord.

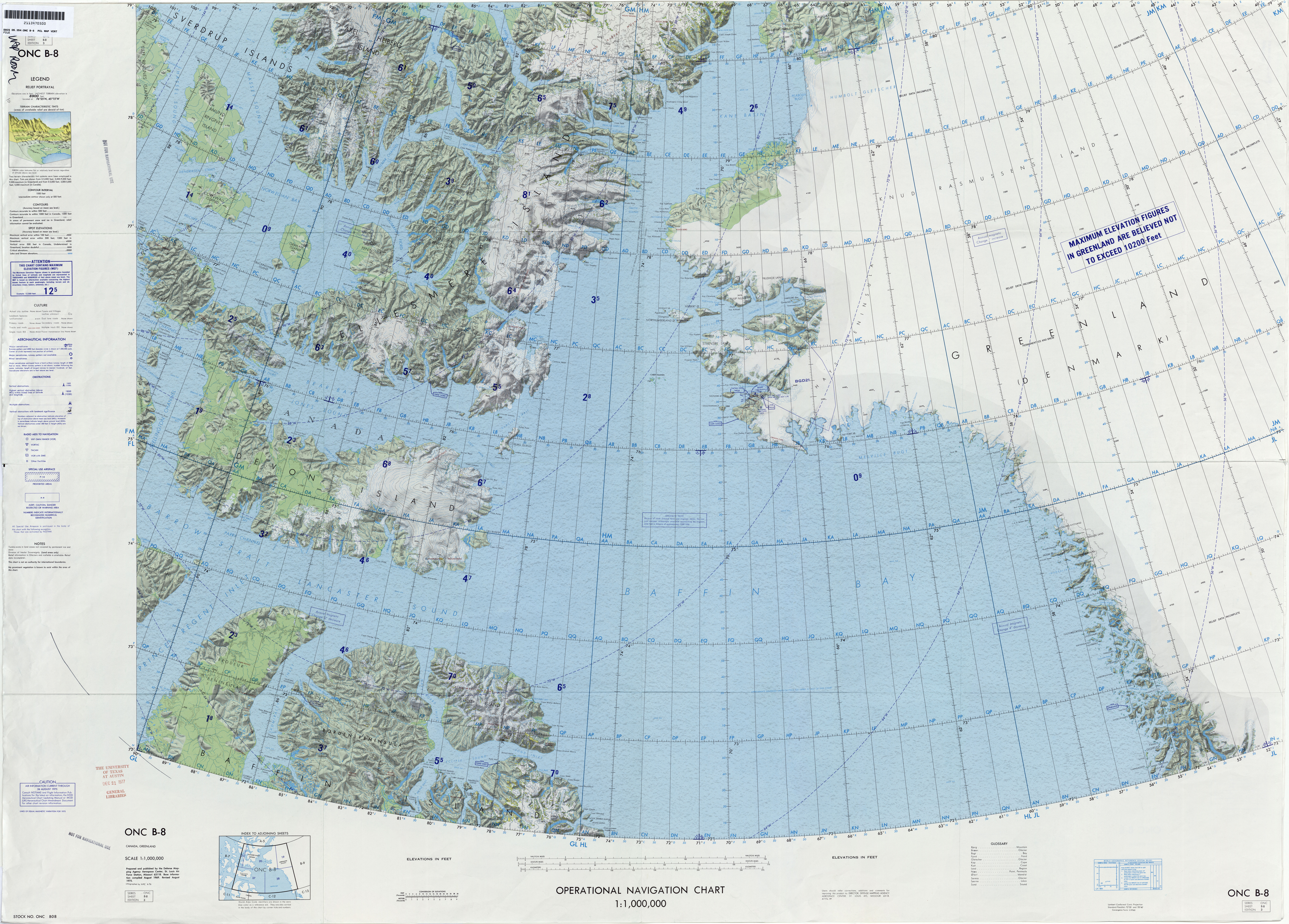
Map of Northwestern Greenland

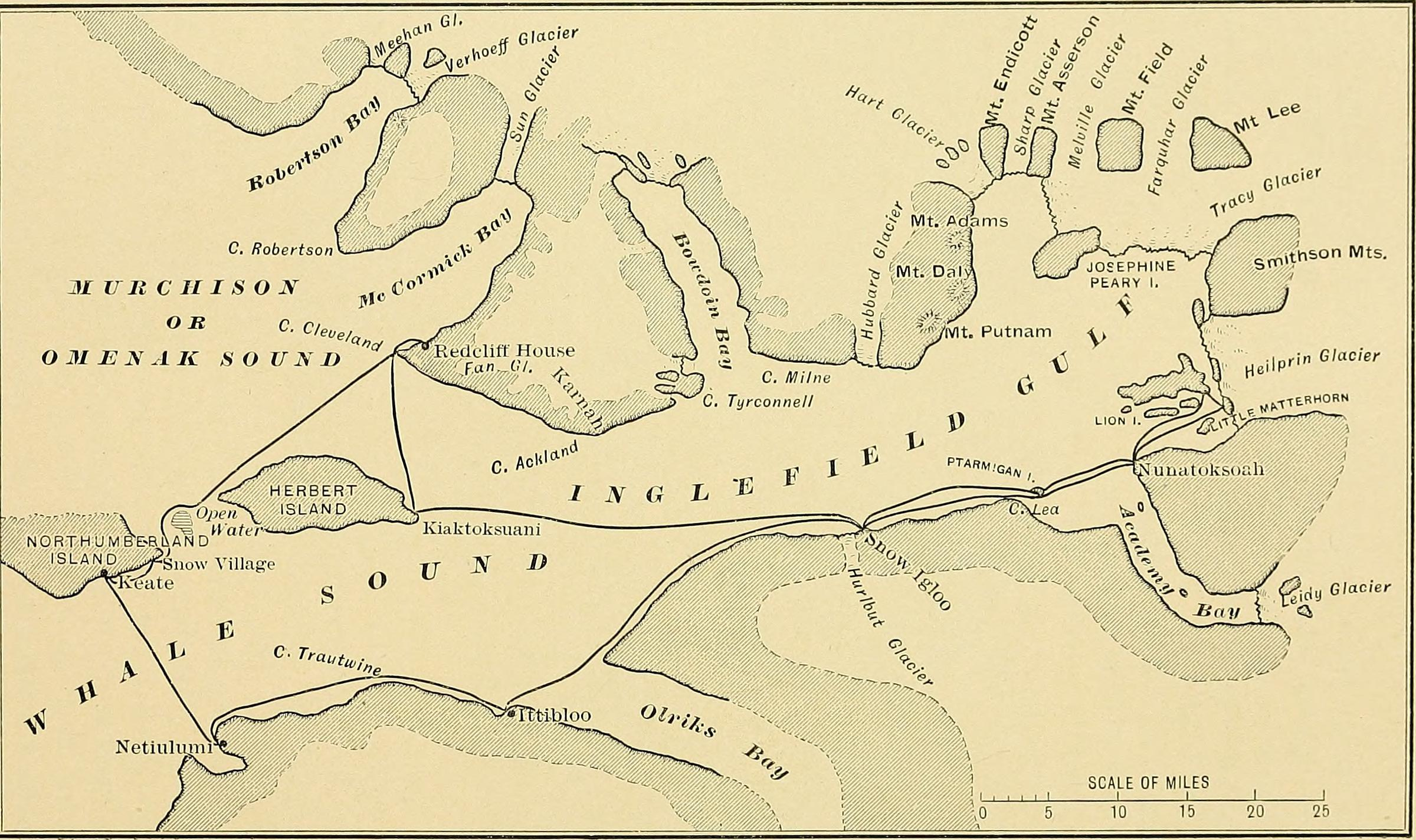
19th century map of the Inglefield Gulf.

== See also ==
- List of fjords of Greenland
