= Cape Robertson, Greenland =

Headland in Avannaata, Greenland

Cape Robertson Kap Robertson, Tuloriok
- Cape
- Coordinates: 77°47′N 71°25′W
- Location: NW Greenland
- Offshore water bodies: Murchison Sound; Baffin Bay

Area
  - Total: Arctic
- Elevation: 4 metres (13 feet)

Cape Robertson (Danish: Kap Robertson), also known as Tuloriok, is a headland in Northwest Greenland, Avannaata municipality.

== Geography ==
Cape Robertson is located in the northern shore of Murchison Sound, Baffin Bay. it rises at the end of a promontory, south of the fjord where the Morris Jesup Glacier has its terminus, east of the mouth of Robertson Fjord and west of MacCormick Fjord. The cape has an elevation of 4 meters (13 feet).

Cape Robertson was named after Dr. John Robertson, a surgeon on HMS Terror, one of the two lost ships seeking the Northwest Passage on the British expedition of 1845.

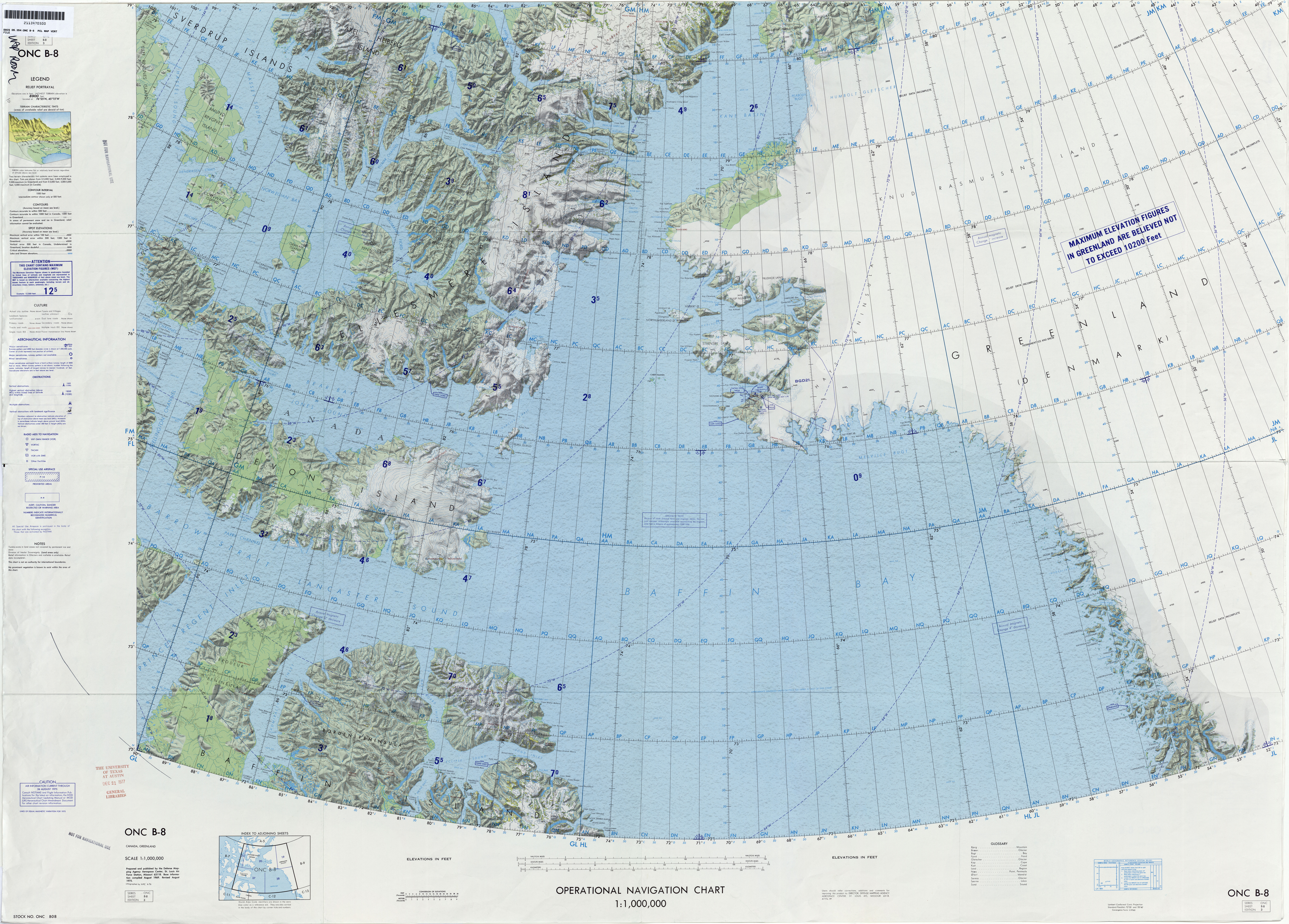
Map of Northwestern Greenland

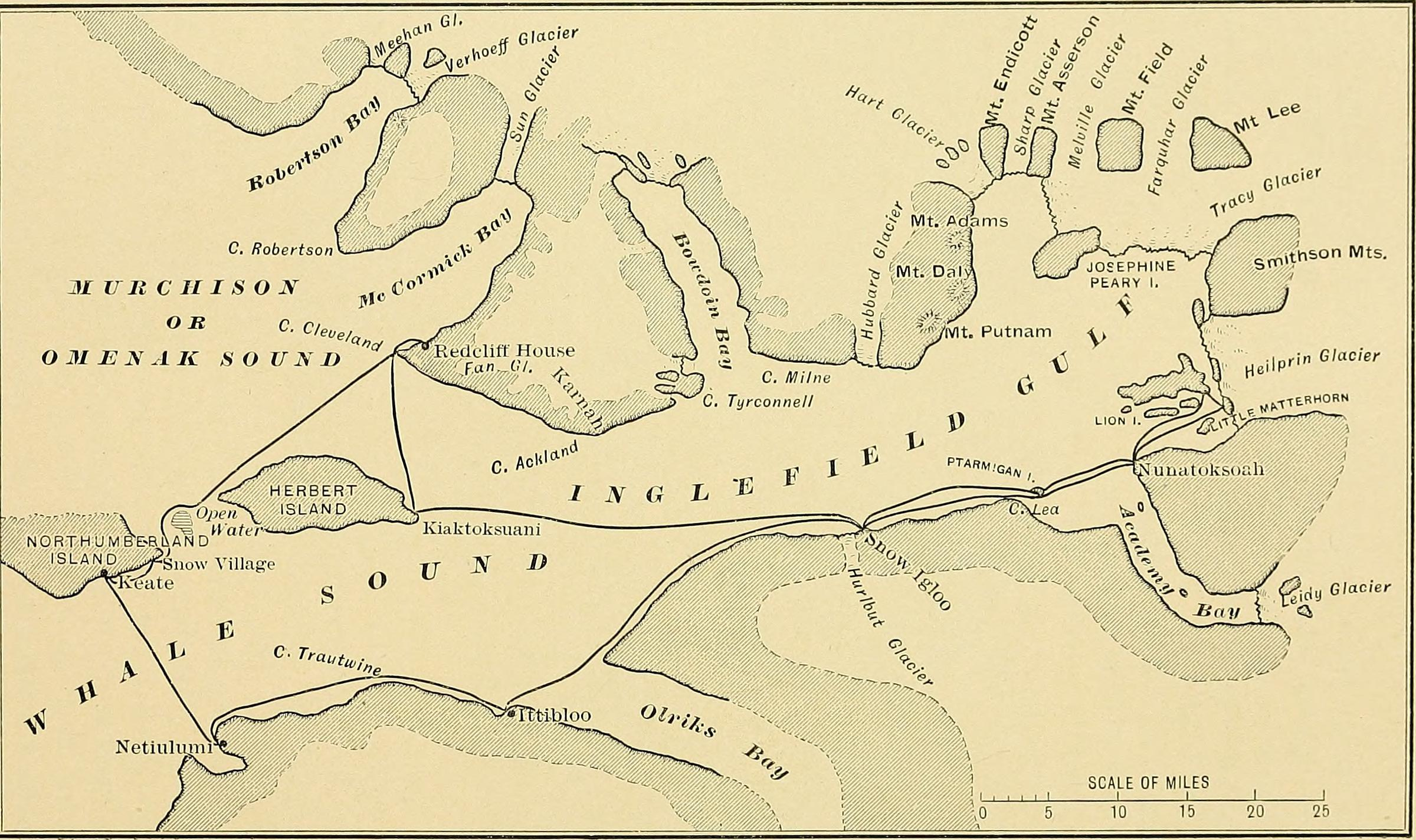
19th century map of the Inglefield Gulf.
