= Siorapaluup Kangerlua =

Fjord in Greenland

- Robertson Fjord
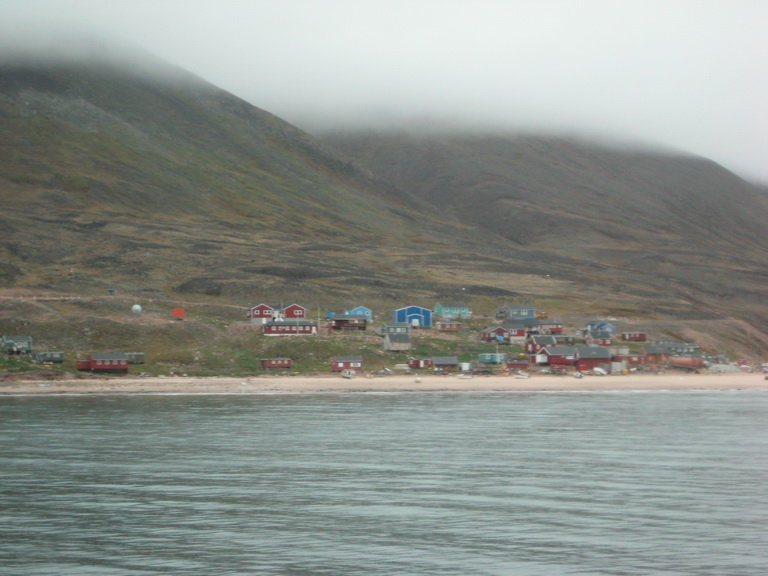
- View of the northern shore of the fjord with the houses of Siorapaluk.

- Location in Greenland
- Location: Arctic
- Coordinates: 77°44′N 70°44′W
- Ocean/sea sources: Murchison Sound; Baffin Bay
- Basin countries: Greenland
- Max. length: 32 km (20 mi)
- Max. width: 9 km (5.6 mi)

Siorapaluup Kangerlua, also known as Robertson Fjord and Robertson Bay, is a fjord in northern Greenland. To the southwest, the fjord opens into the Murchison Sound of the Baffin Bay. Administratively it belongs to the Avannaata municipality.

The settlement of Siorapaluk is located in the northern shore of the fjord.

== History ==
In 1920 a spot in the shore of the fjord was chosen by Lauge Koch as a base during his expedition to Peary Land further north.

== Geography ==
Siorapaluup Kangerlua, together with MacCormick Fjord close to the east, is one of the two main indentations of the northern side of the Murchison Sound. It runs in a roughly NE/SW direction with its mouth southeast of Cape Robertson, beyond the western end of the Inglefield Gulf and south of the unnamed fjord where the Morris Jesup Glacier has its terminus.

The waters of the fjord are very deep. There are impressive cliffs lining the fjord's shores near its head, where the Meehan Glacier and the Verhoeff Glacier discharge from the Greenland Ice Sheet. The terminus of the Verhoeff Glacier is an almost 30 m (98 ft) high wall of ice on the eastern side of the head of the fjord.

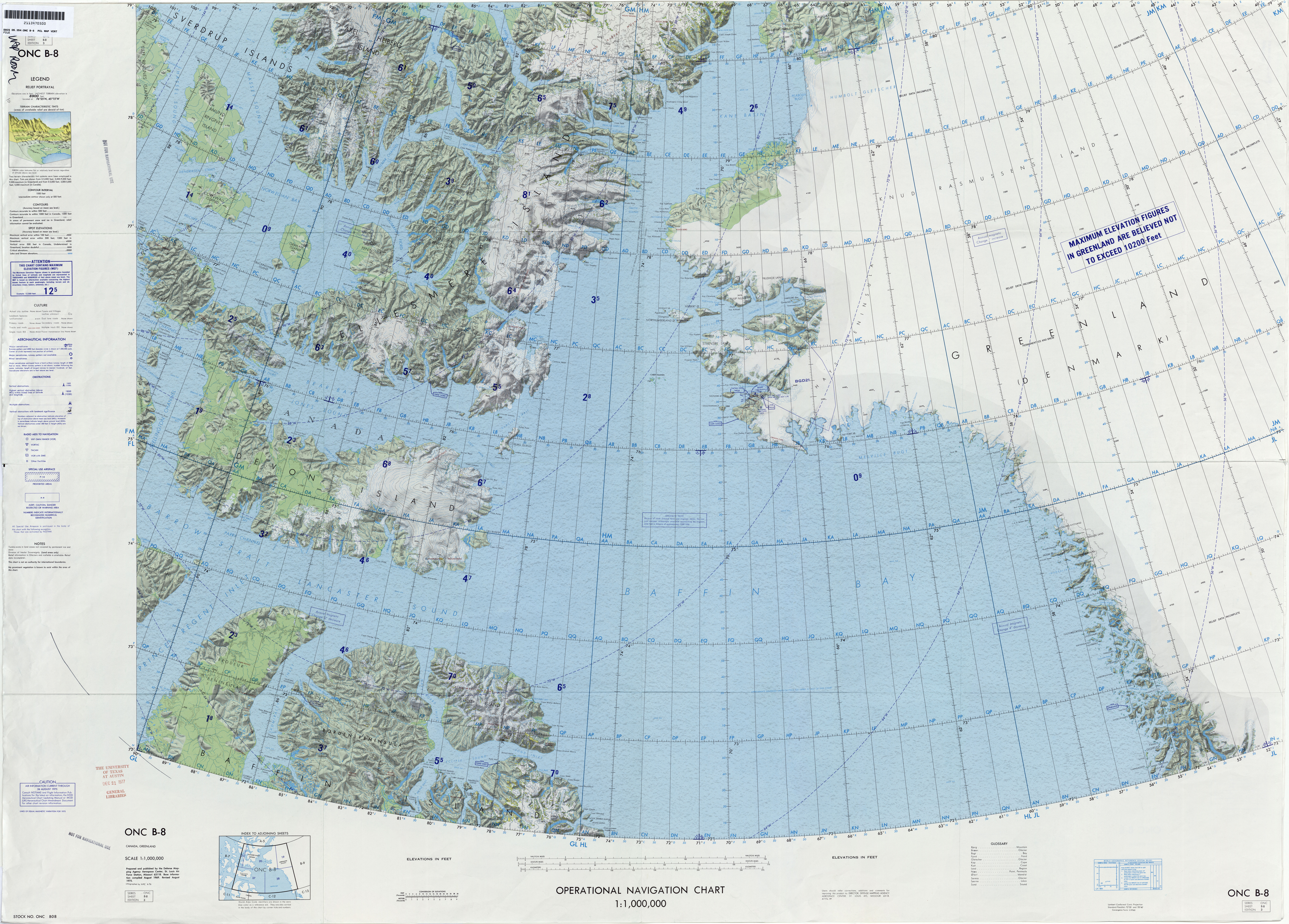
Map of Northwestern Greenland

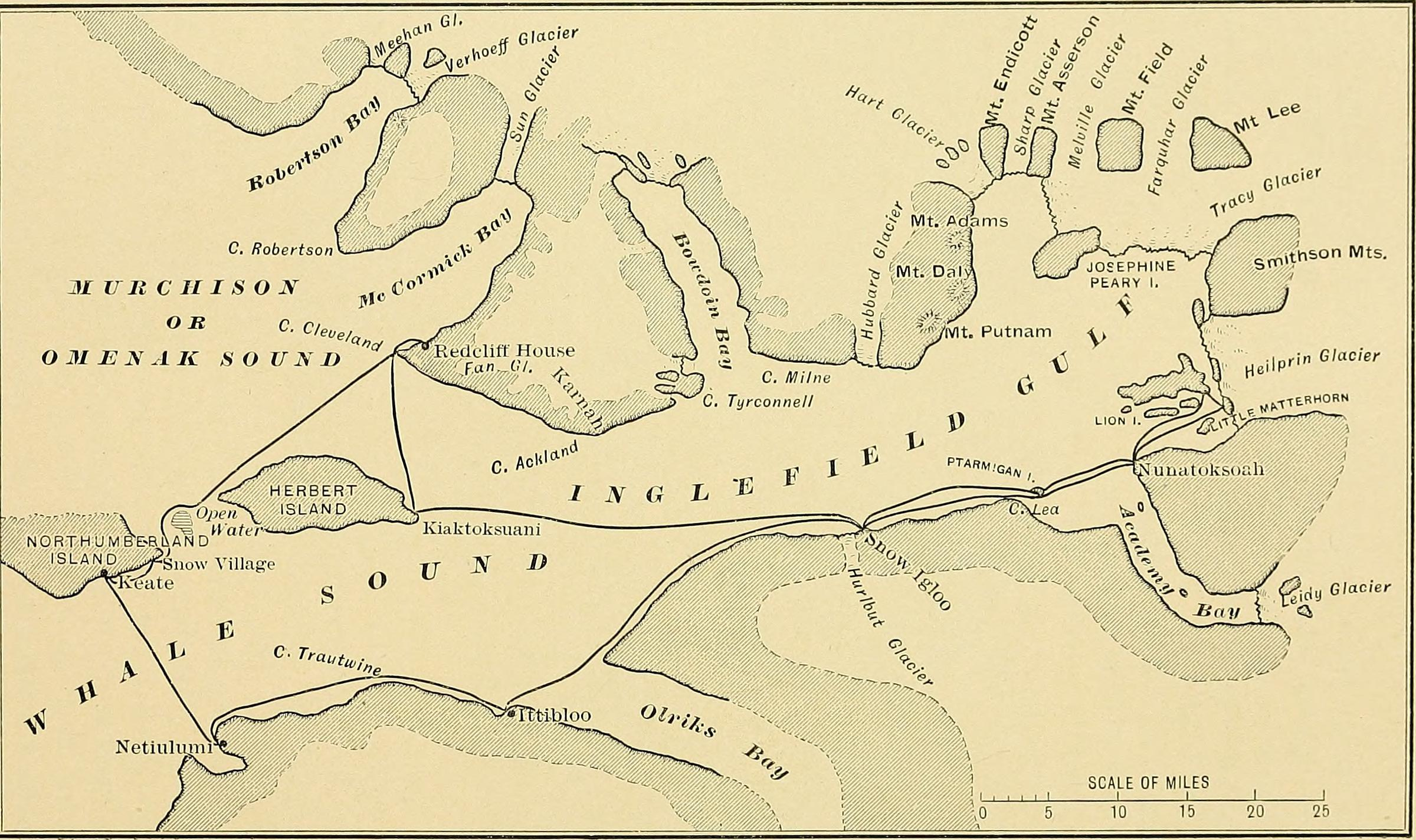
19th century map of the Inglefield Gulf.

== See also ==
- List of fjords of Greenland
- Siorapaluk Heliport
