= Siorapaluk Heliport =

Heliport in Greenland

- IATA: SRK; ICAO: BGSI

Summary
- Airport type: Public
- Operator: Greenland Airport Authority (Mittarfeqarfiit)
- Serves: Siorapaluk, Greenland
- Elevation AMSL: 102 ft / 31 m
- Coordinates: 77°47′11″N 070°38′18″W
- Website: Siorapaluk Heliport

Map
- Location in Greenland

Helipads
| Number | Length | | Surface |
| Number | m | ft | Surface |
|---|---|---|---|
| 1 | 13.5 | 44 | Gravel |
- Source: Danish AIS

Siorapaluk Heliport (IATA: SRK, ICAO: BGSI) is a heliport in Siorapaluk, a village by the shore of the Robertson Fjord, Avannaata municipality, northern Greenland. The heliport is considered a helistop, and is served by Air Greenland as part of a government contract. It is the northernmost aerodrome in Greenland with scheduled civilian flights.

== Airlines and destinations ==
| Airlines | Destinations |
|---|---|
| Air Greenland (settlement flights) | Qaanaaq |

Air Greenland operates government contract flights to villages in the Qaanaaq area. These mostly cargo flights are not featured in the timetable, although they can be pre-booked. Departure times for these flights as specified during booking are by definition approximate, with the settlement service optimized on the fly depending on local demand for a given day.
