= Cape Cleveland, Avannaata =

Hheadland in northwest Greenland

Cape Cleveland Kap Cleveland, Innartalik
- Cape
- Coordinates: 77°34′N 70°15′W
- Location: NW Greenland
- Offshore water bodies: Murchison Sound; Baffin Bay

Area
  - Total: Arctic
- Elevation: 17 metres (56 feet)

Cape Cleveland (Danish: Kap Cleveland), also known as Innartalik, is a headland in Northwest Greenland, Avannaata municipality.

== Geography ==
Cape Cleveland is located in the northern shore of Murchison Sound, north of Qeqertarsuaq (Herbert Island) near the entrance of Inglefield Gulf, Baffin Bay. It rises at the western end of Piulip Nunaa, on the eastern side of the mouth of MacCormick Fjord.

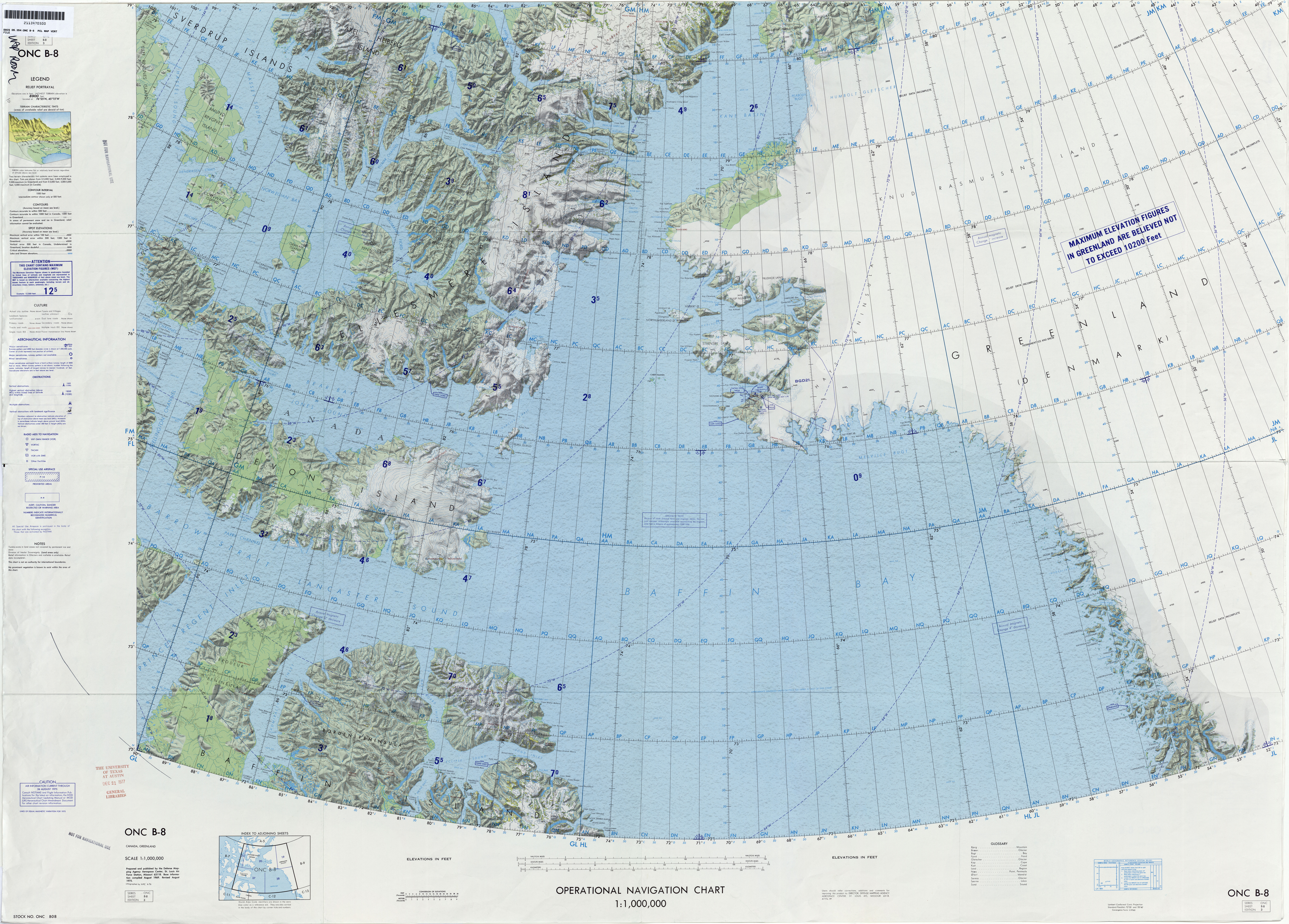
Map of Northwestern Greenland

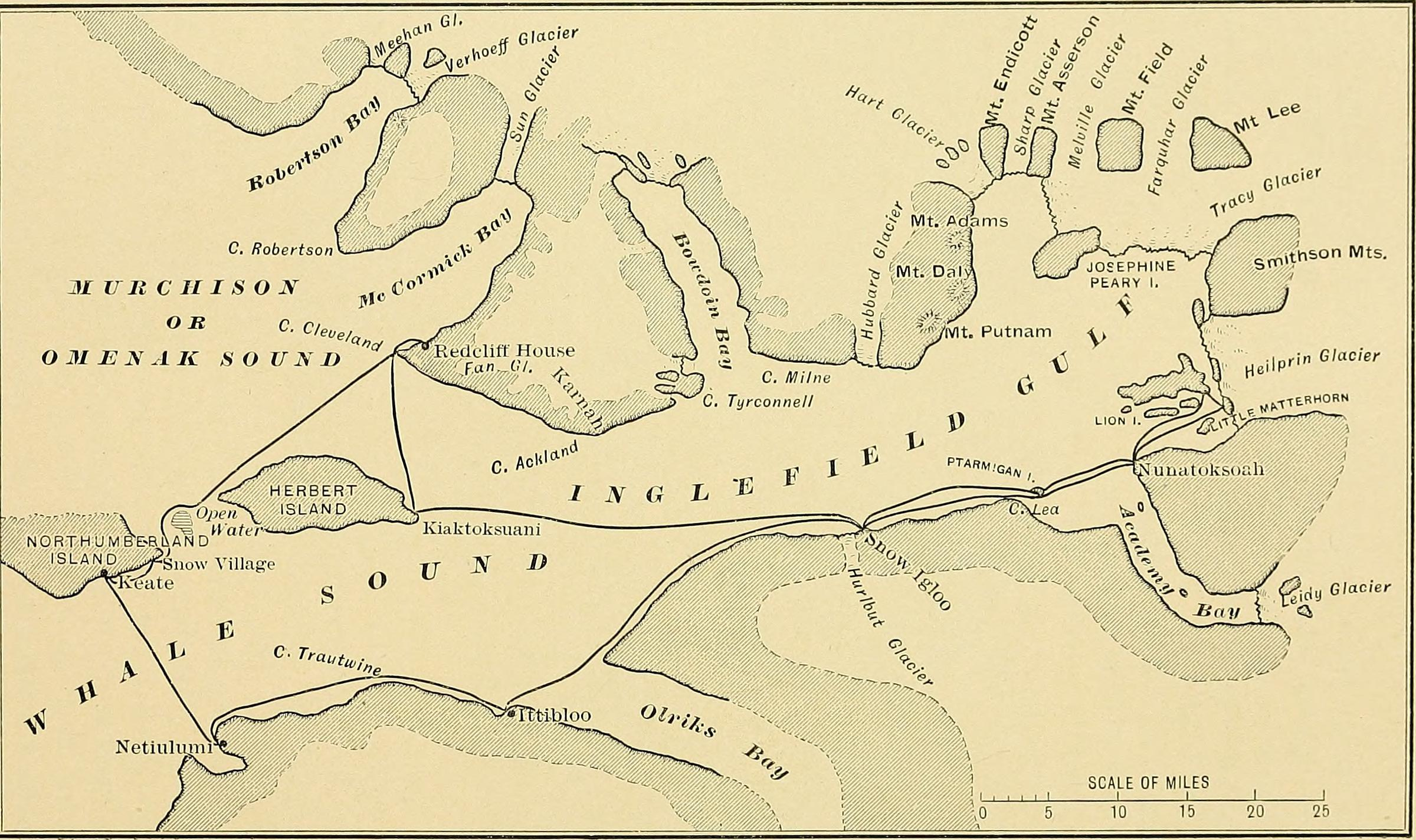
19th century map of the Inglefield Gulf.
