= MacCormick Fjord =

Fjord in Greenland

- Iterlassuaq (Greenlandic)
- Location in Greenland
- Location: Arctic
- Coordinates: 77°40′N 70°0′W
- Ocean/sea sources: Murchison Sound; Baffin Bay
- Basin countries: Greenland
- Max. length: 25 km (16 mi)
- Max. width: 8 km (5.0 mi)

MacCormick Fjord (Greenlandic: Iterlassuaq) is a fjord in northern Greenland. To the southwest, the fjord opens into the Murchison Sound of the Baffin Bay.

== History ==
In 1891 a spot in the southern shore near the mouth of the fjord was chosen as a place for the recovery of Robert Peary during his Second Greenland Expedition. A house was built and the site was named "Red Cliff".

== Geography ==
MacCormick Fjord, together with Robertson Fjord close to the west, is one of the two main indentations of the northern side of the Murchison Sound. It runs in a roughly NE/SW direction east of Cape Robertson, with its mouth north of Cape Cleveland, beyond the western end of the Inglefield Gulf. Piulip Nunaa is the peninsula that separates this fjord from Bowdoin Fjord to the east and MacCormick Fjord forms the peninsula's western coastline. Most of the fjord's shores are beach.

The Sun Glacier discharges from the Greenland Ice Sheet at the head of the MacCormick Fjord and its terminus is a 30 m (98 ft) high wall; the smaller Scarlet Heart Glacier has its terminus on the eastern shore of the inner fjord, about 20 km (12 mi) from its mouth.

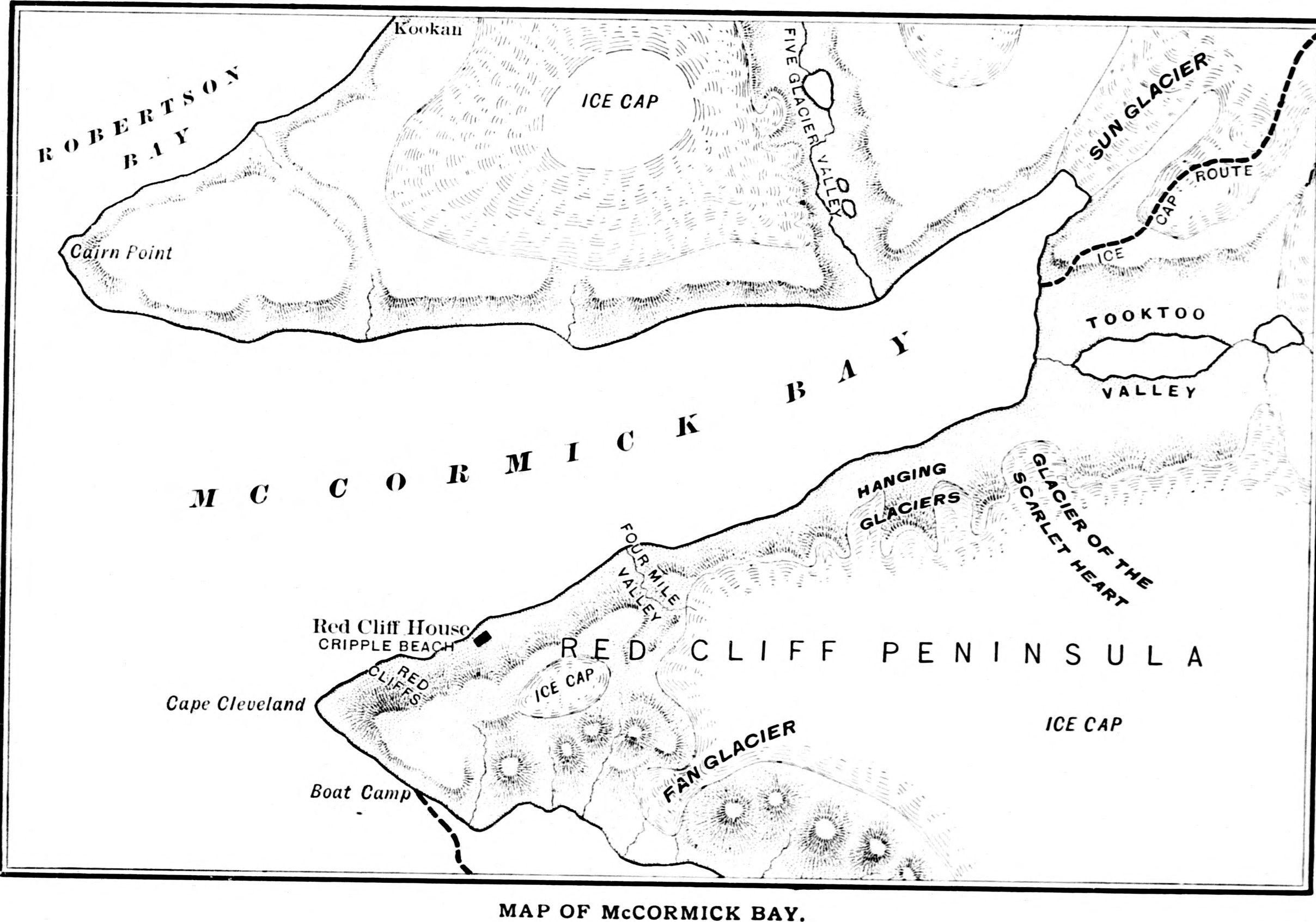
Map of "McCormick Bay" in the 1890s

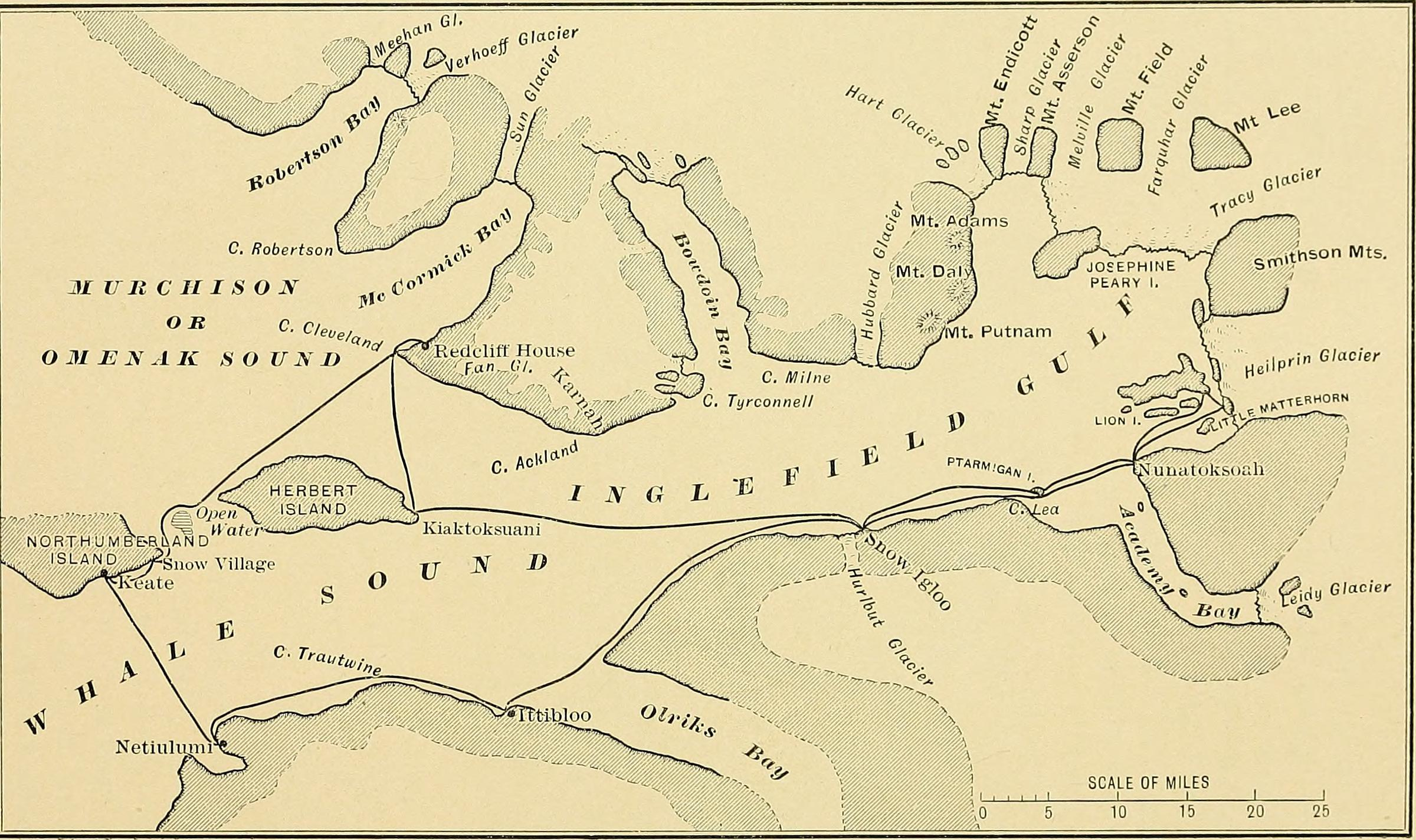
Map of a sledge trip around Inglefield Gulf, starting and finishing at Red Cliff, in 1892

== See also ==
- List of fjords of Greenland
