= Kiatak =

Island off the coast of northern Greenland

Northumberland Island
Native name: Kiatak (Kujata)
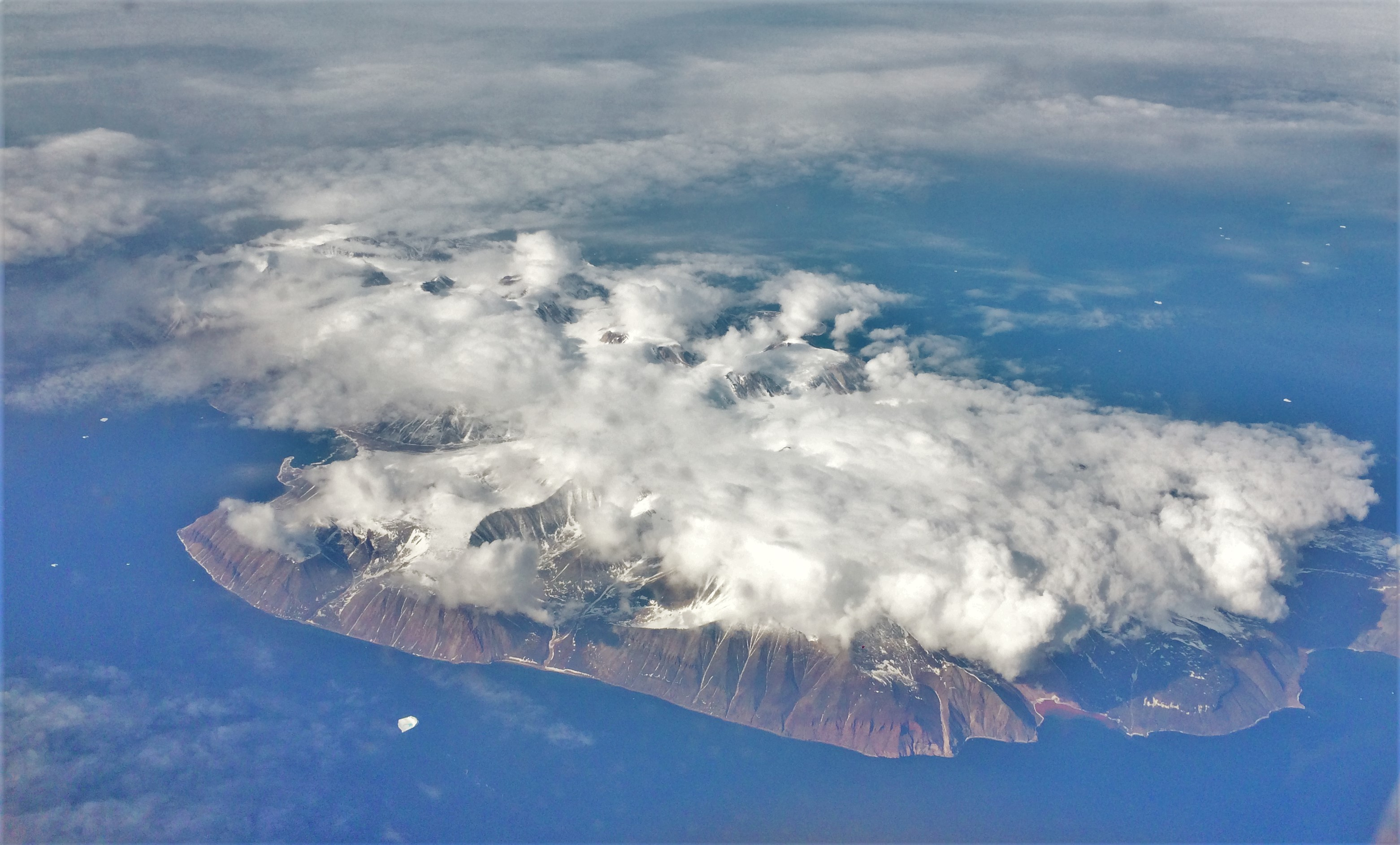
- Aerial view of Kiatak Island

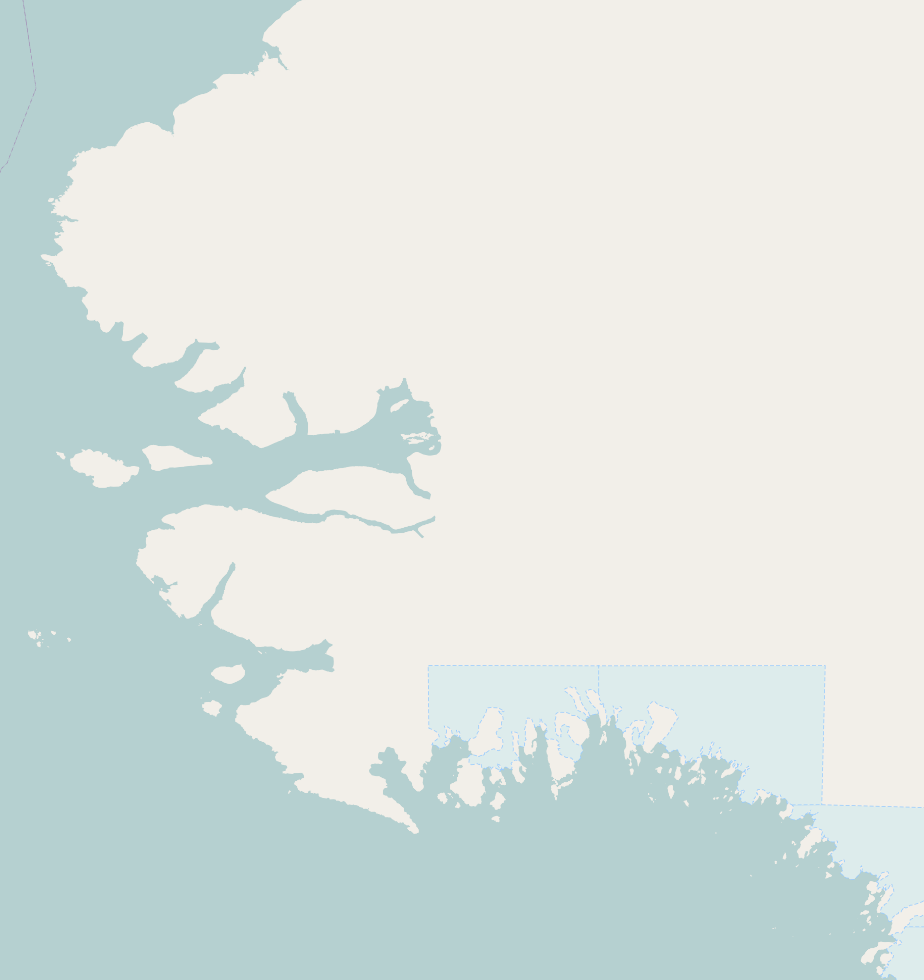
- Location of Northumberland Island in Greenland Northumberland Island (Greenland)
- Interactive map of Northumberland Island

Geography
- Location: Baffin Bay, Greenland
- Coordinates: 77°23′N 71°56′W
- Area: 277 km^{2} (107 sq mi)
- Area rank: 26th largest in Greenland
- Highest elevation: 1,030 m (3380 ft)
- Highest point: Nalungiussaq

Administration
- Greenland
- Municipality: Avannaata

Demographics
- Population: 0 (2023)
- Pop. density: 0/km^{2} (0/sq mi)
- Ethnic groups: none

Kiatak or Northumberland Island (Danish: Northumberland Ø), also known as Kujata, is an island off the coast of northern Greenland.

== Geography ==
This relatively large island is part of a small group formed by Kiatak, Herbert Island and Hakluyt Island. The latter is the smallest of the group and lies off Kiatak's western shore. The islands lie off the Inglefield Fjord, between the Murchison Sound to the north and the Hvalsund to the south.

== Important Bird Area ==
The island has been designated an Important Bird Area (IBA) by BirdLife International because it supports a breeding population of some 2.5 million pairs of little auks, as well as other seabird species.

== History ==
The island was inhabited at the time of Robert Peary's Greenland expeditions in 1886 and 1891–1897.

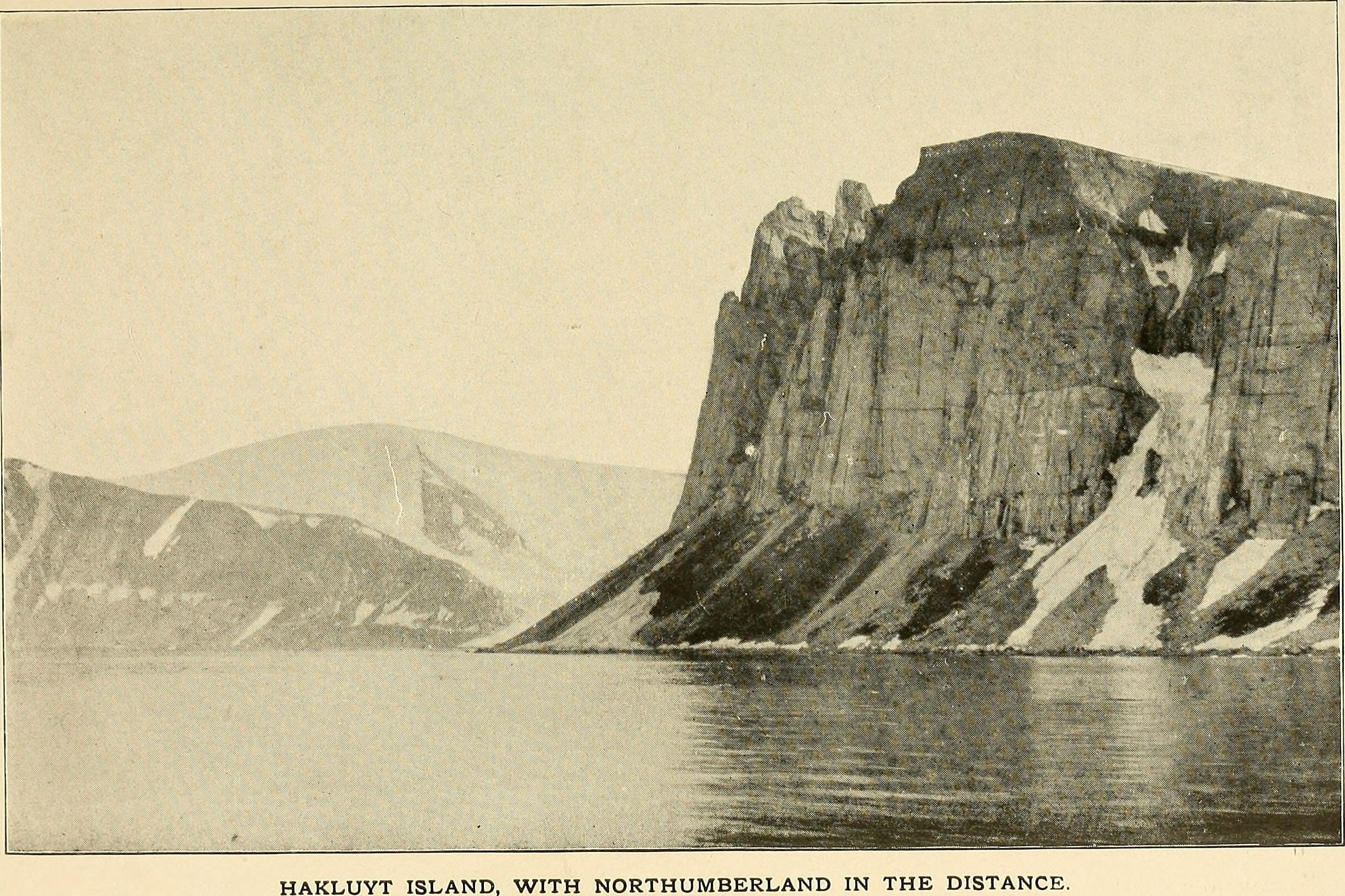
View of a cliff in Hakluyt Island with Kiatak in the background.

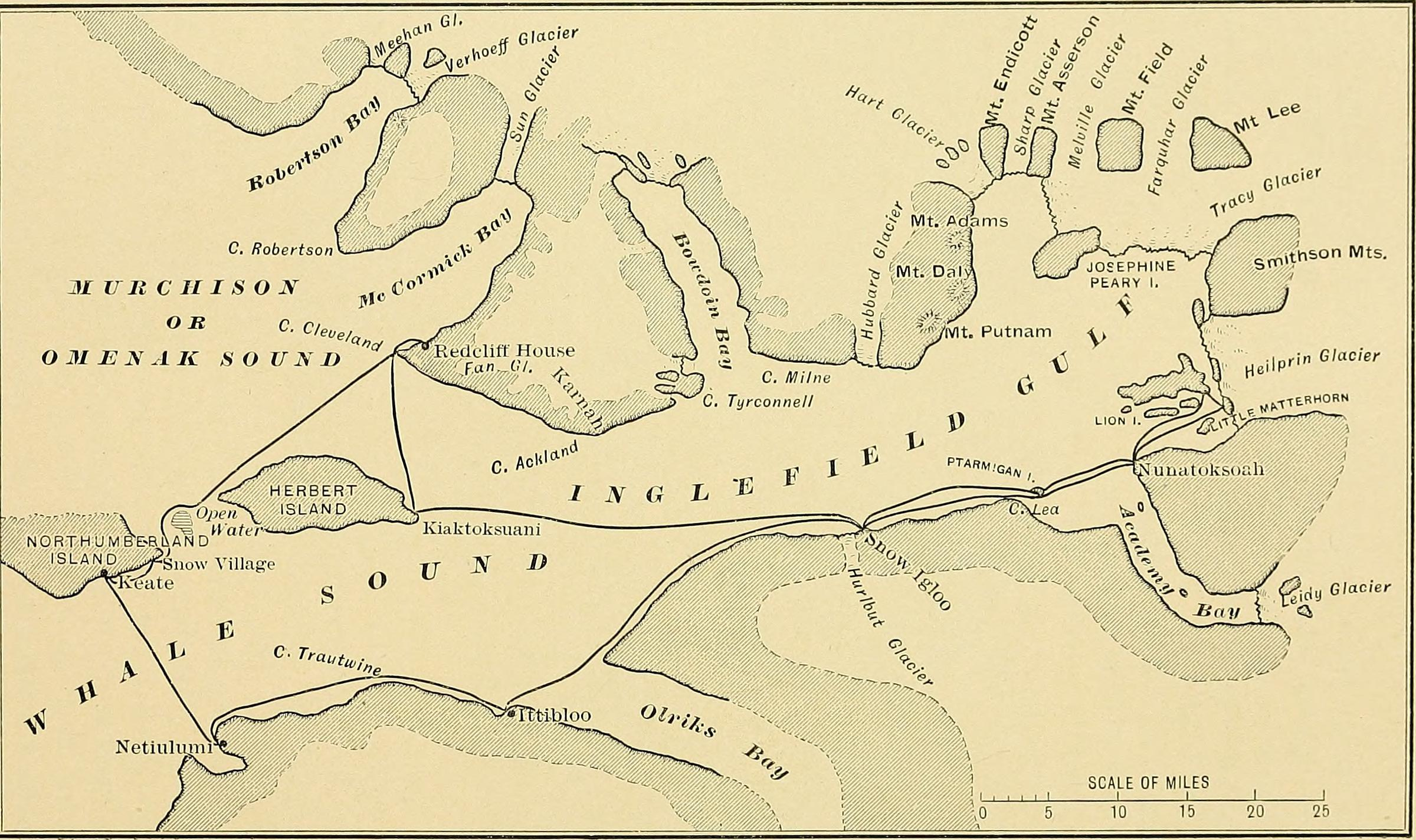
19th century map with Northumberland Island, Herbert Island, Whale Sound and Inglefield Gulf.

== See also ==
- List of islands of Greenland

== Bibliography ==
- Peary, Robert (1898). Northward over the great ice : a narrative of life and work along the shores and upon the interior ice-cap of northern Greenland in the years 1886 and 1891-1897, with a description of the little tribe of Smith Sound Eskimos, the most northerly human beings in the world, and an account of the discovery and bringing home of the Saviksue or great Cape York meteorites. New York, NY: F.A. Stokes Company. Book Viewer
