= Qeqertarsuaq (Herbert Island) =

Island in Baffin Bay

Herbert Island
Native name: Qeqertarsuaq
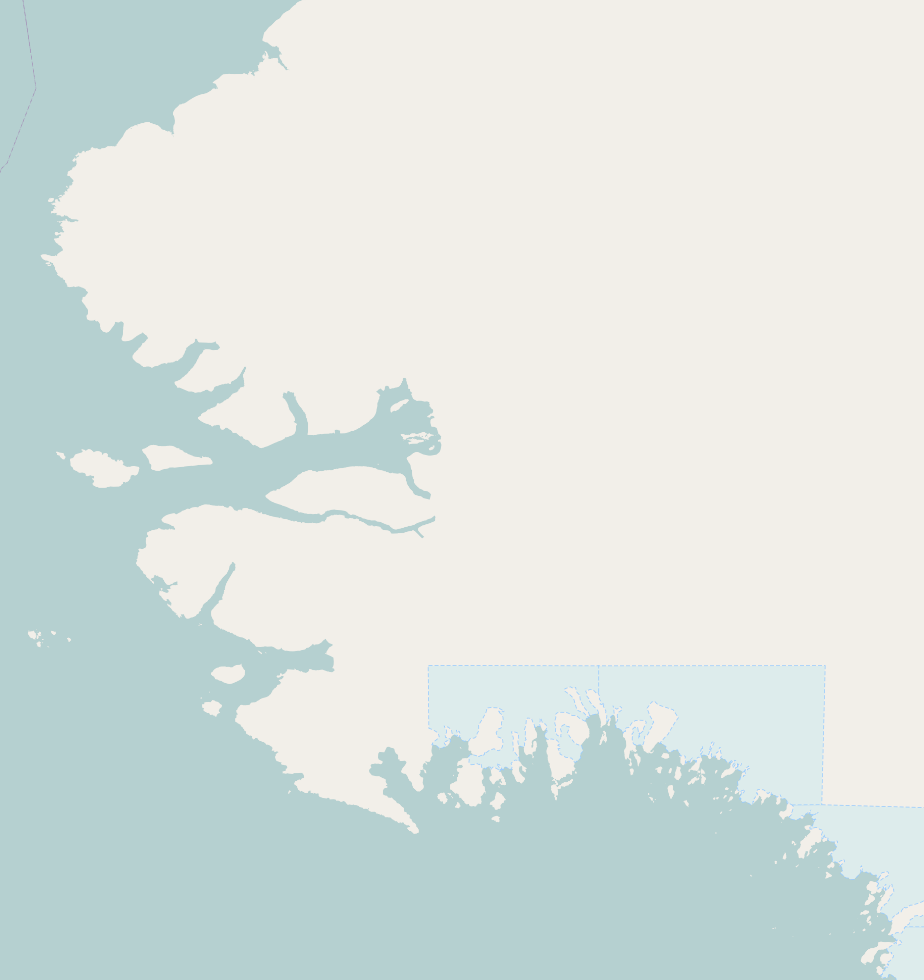
- Location of Herbert Island in Greenland Herbert Island (Greenland)
- Interactive map of Herbert Island

Geography
- Location: Baffin Bay, Greenland
- Coordinates: 77°25′52″N 70°41′47″W
- Area: 277 km^{2} (107 sq mi)
- Area rank: 26th largest in Greenland
- Highest elevation: 890 m (2920 ft)
- Highest point: Nalungiussaq

Administration
- Greenland
- Municipality: Avannaata

Demographics
- Population: 0 (2023)
- Pop. density: 0/km^{2} (0/sq mi)
- Ethnic groups: none

Qeqertarsuaq or Herbert Island is an island in Baffin Bay near Qaanaaq in the Avannaata municipality, NW Greenland. The island has an area of 223 km^{2}.

Qeqertarsuaq, meaning "Large Island", is the name of several other places in Greenland. It is also the name of an abandoned fishing village located near the eastern end of the island.

== Geography ==
Herbert Island lies south of Cape Cleveland and is part of a small group formed by Northumberland Island, Hakluyt Island and Herbert Island. The latter is the easternmost of the group. Aligned from east to west, the islands lie off the Inglefield Fjord, between the Murchison Sound to the north and the Hvalsund to the south.

Herbert Island is located closest to the mouth of the Inglefield Fjord.

== History ==
An account of life on the island in the 1970s is given by Marie Herbert in her 1973 book The Snow People, after she lived for a year in the (now abandoned) village of Qeqertarsuaq with her husband and young daughter.

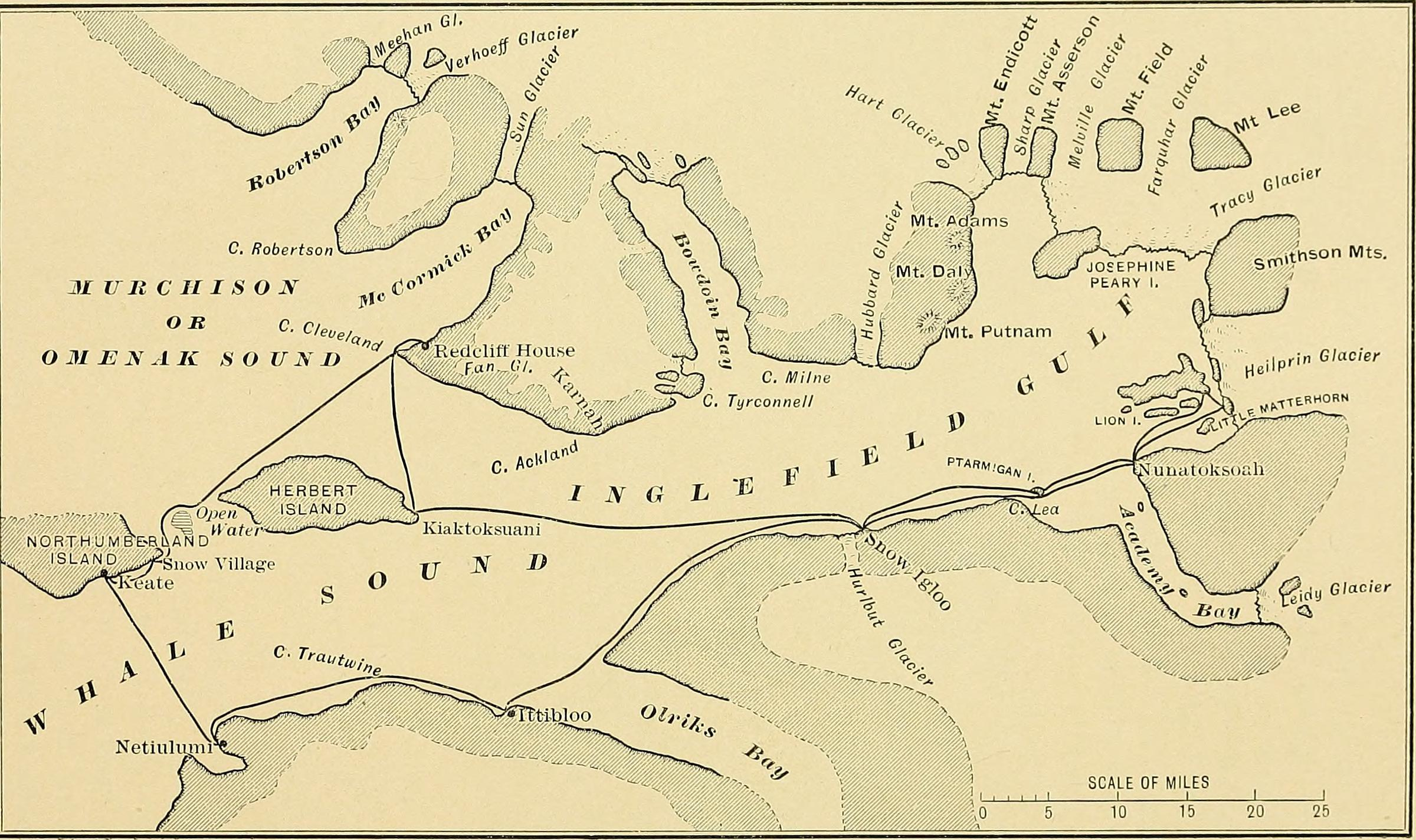
19th century map with Herbert Island, Whale Sound and Inglefield Gulf.

== See also ==
- List of islands of Greenland
