= Frank Wilbert Stokes =

American painter

Frank Wilbert Stokes, also known as Frank Stokes, Frank W. Stokes and F. W. Stokes (November 27, 1858 – 1955) was an American sketch artist and painter who specialized in illustrations of arctic and antarctic themes. A large collection of his works is now in the Smithsonian American Art Museum.

== Biography ==
Stokes was born in Nashville, Tennessee, United States in 1858.

He studied art at the Pennsylvania Academy of the Fine Arts under Thomas Eakins. Later on Stokes spent nine years in England and France where he in Paris studied at the École nationale supérieure des Beaux-Arts under Jean-Léon Gérôme, the Académie Colarossi under Raphaël Collin and the Académie Julian under Gustave Boulanger. Besides classical training in style and technique he also was influenced by impressionist style.

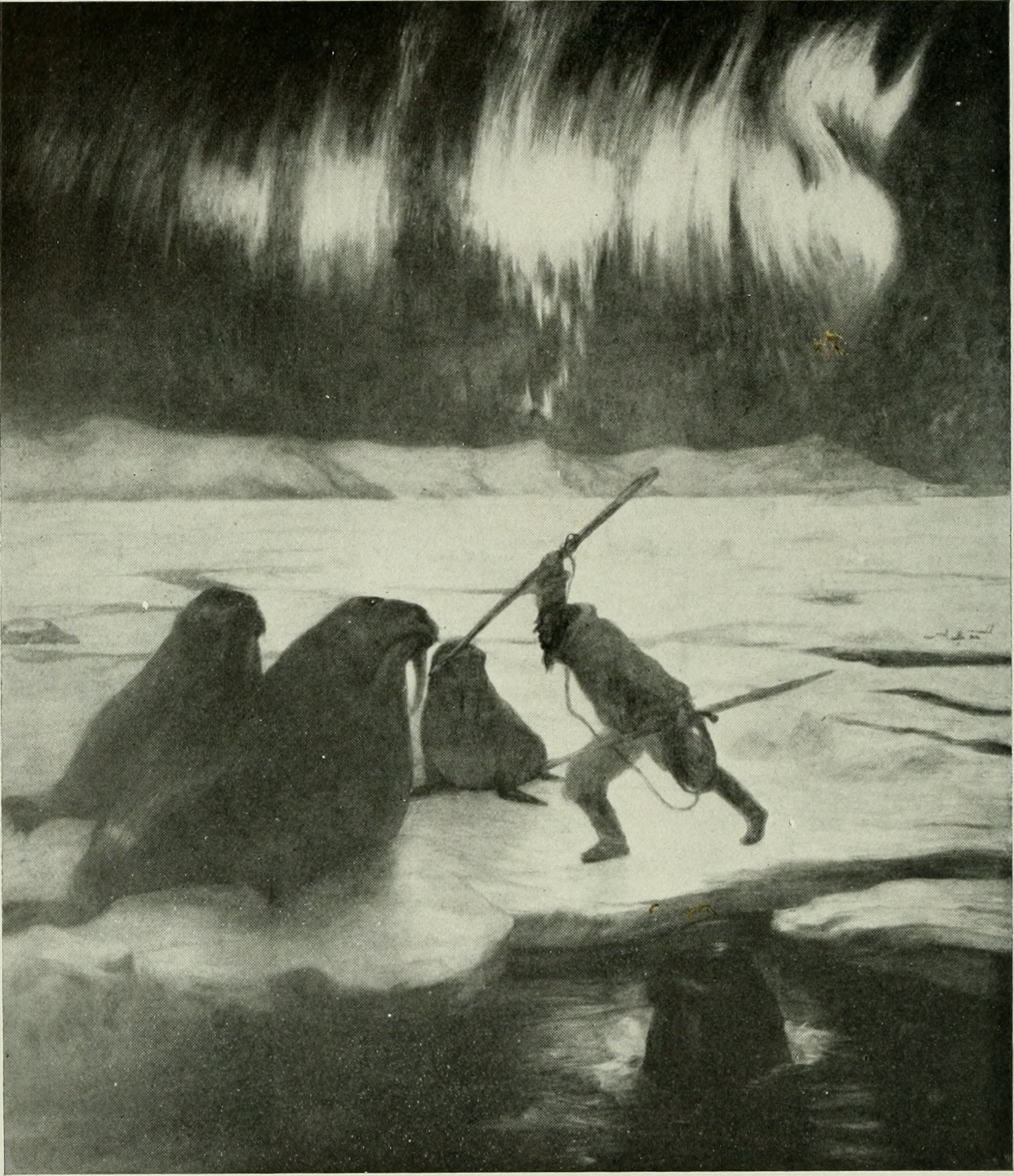
1908 mural at the American Museum of Natural History. depicting an Inuit man hunting walrus under an arora borealis.

Stoke participated in expeditions to northern Greenland under Robert Peary during 1886 and 1892 - 1894.

In 1902 he joined the Antarctic on the Swedish Antarctic Expedition under Otto Nordenskjöld. While on Snow Hill Island, on the Antarctic Peninsula, Stokes collected fossil bivalves, gastropods, ammonites, and a lobster. After returning to the United States in 1903, these specimens were described by the paleontologist Stuart Weller. The nephropid lobster Hoploparia stokesi, the first arthropod to be described from Antarctica, was named after Stokes.

In 1909 and 1910 Stokes completed mural decorations at the American Museum of Natural History in New York City.

During 1925 - 1926 he joined the Amundsen-Ellsworth expeditions.

Stokes had a number of exhibitions during his career, some which were held at the Brooklyn Institute Museum of Arctic and Antarctic Pictures in 1894, the Art Institute of Chicago February 27 through March 16, 1900 and in New York City December 21 through January 22, 1925 – 1926.

Stokes died in New York City, New York in 1955.

== Works by Stokes ==
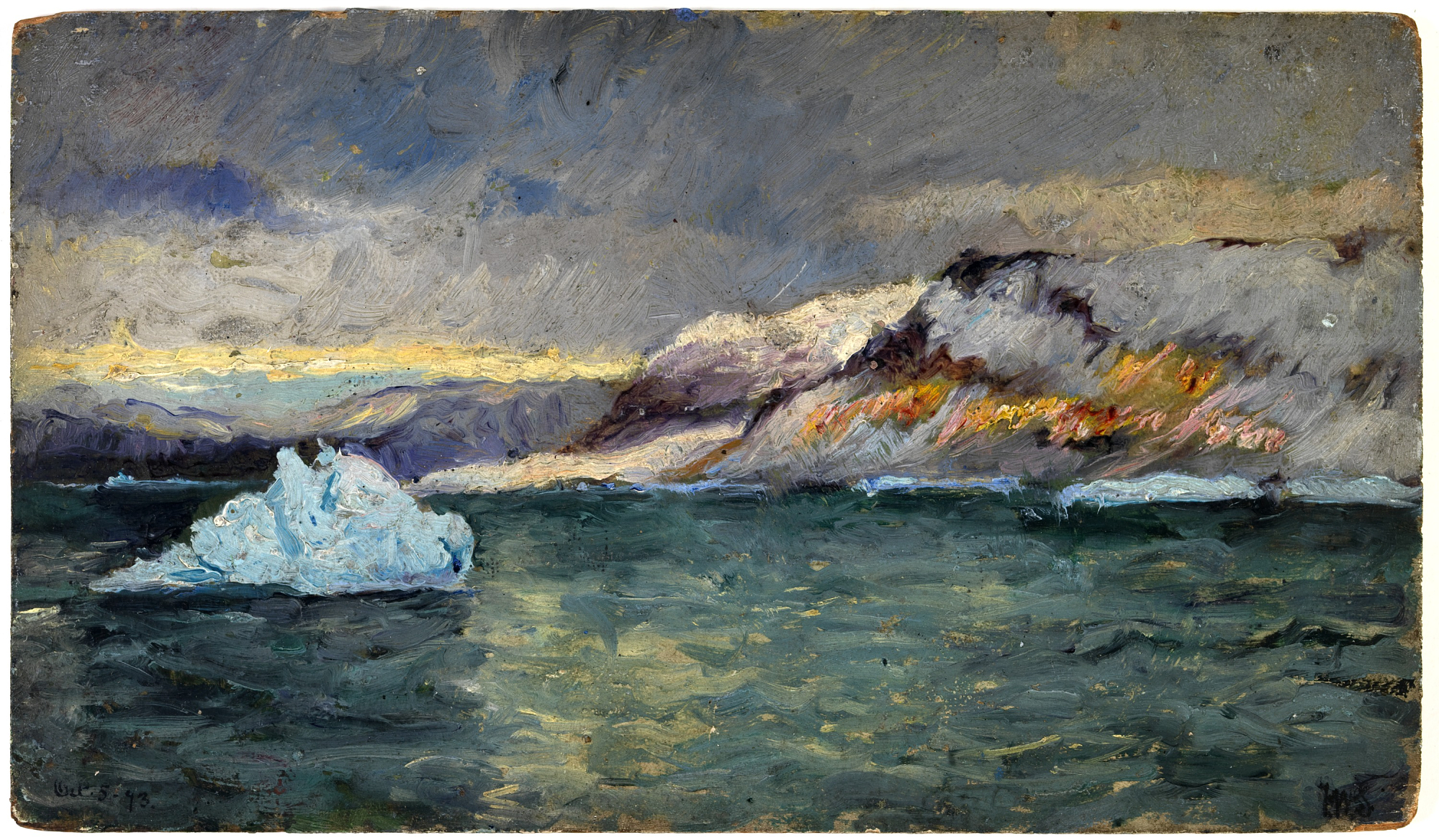
Sunrise Glow on the Cliffs, Bowdoin Bay.

Sketches (selected)

- "King Oscar II Land" (Jan 20, 1902)
- "An Iceberg off Palmer Island" (Jan 20, 1902)
- "Weddell Sea" (Jan 31, 1902)
- "Cape Gordon, Erebus and Terror Gulf" (Feb 10, 1902)

Oilpaintings (selected)

- "Beagle Channel, Tierra del Fuego" (1902)
- "Sunrise, Atlantic Ocean" (1903)
- "Return of Commander Byrd and Floyd Bennett from the North Pole" (1926)
- "Departure of the "Norge" for the North Pole" (1926)
