= Whale Sound =

Sound in Avannaata, Greenland

- Hvalsund
- Location within Greenland
- Location: NW Greenland
- Coordinates: 77°17′N 71°0′W
- Part of: Arctic Ocean
- Ocean/sea sources: Baffin Bay; Inglefield Gulf
- Basin countries: Greenland
- Max. length: 50 km (31 mi)
- Max. width: 19 km (12 mi)
- Frozen: Most of the year
- Islands: Kiatak (Northumberland Island) and Qeqertarsuaq (Herbert Island)

The Whale Sound (Danish: Hvalsund) is a sound in the Avannaata municipality, NW Greenland.

== Geography ==
It is a broad channel that runs roughly from east to west between the mouth of the Inglefield Fjord and Baffin Bay. Its minimum width is 19 km.

The Whale Sound separates Steensby Land —part of the Greenland mainland— to the south from Kiatak (Northumberland Island) and Qeqertarsuaq (Herbert Island) to the north. The Murchison Sound leads from the Baffin Bay to the Inglefield Fjord on the north side of the islands. the Olrik Fjord has its entrance at the eastern end of the sound.

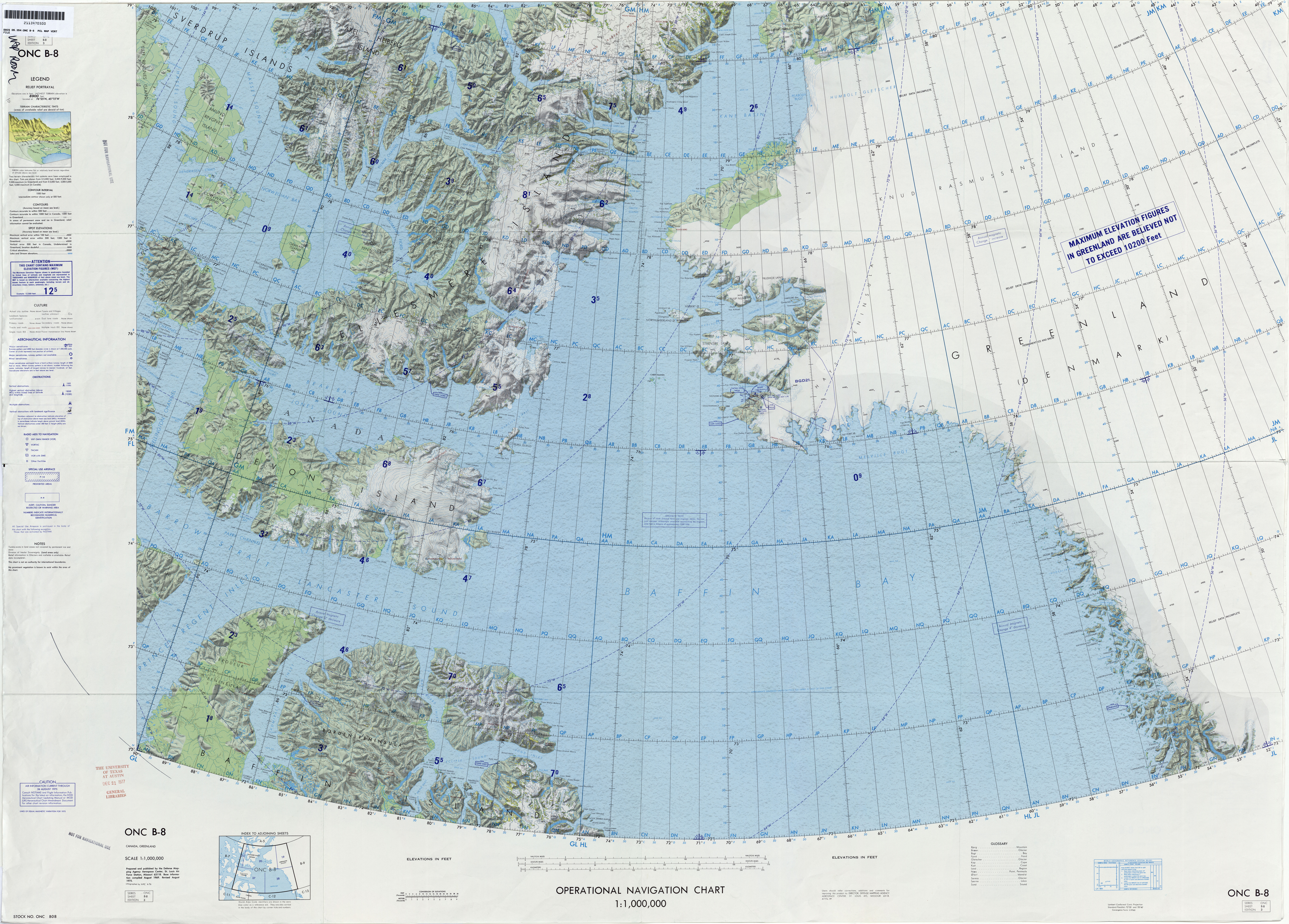
Map of Northwestern Greenland

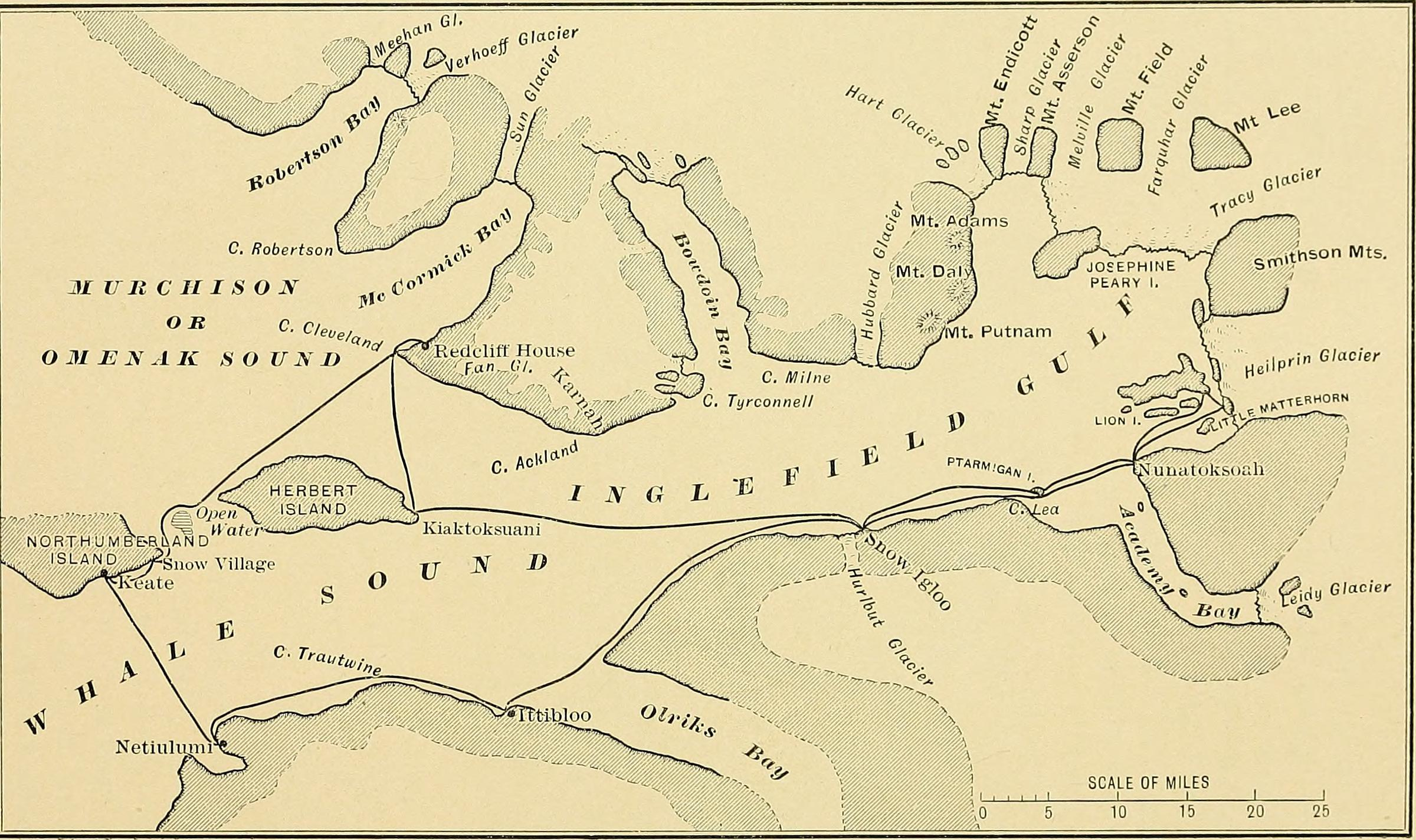
19th century map of the Inglefield Gulf.
