= Siorapaluk =

Place in Greenland, Kingdom of Denmark

Siorapaluk Hiurapaluk
- Settlement
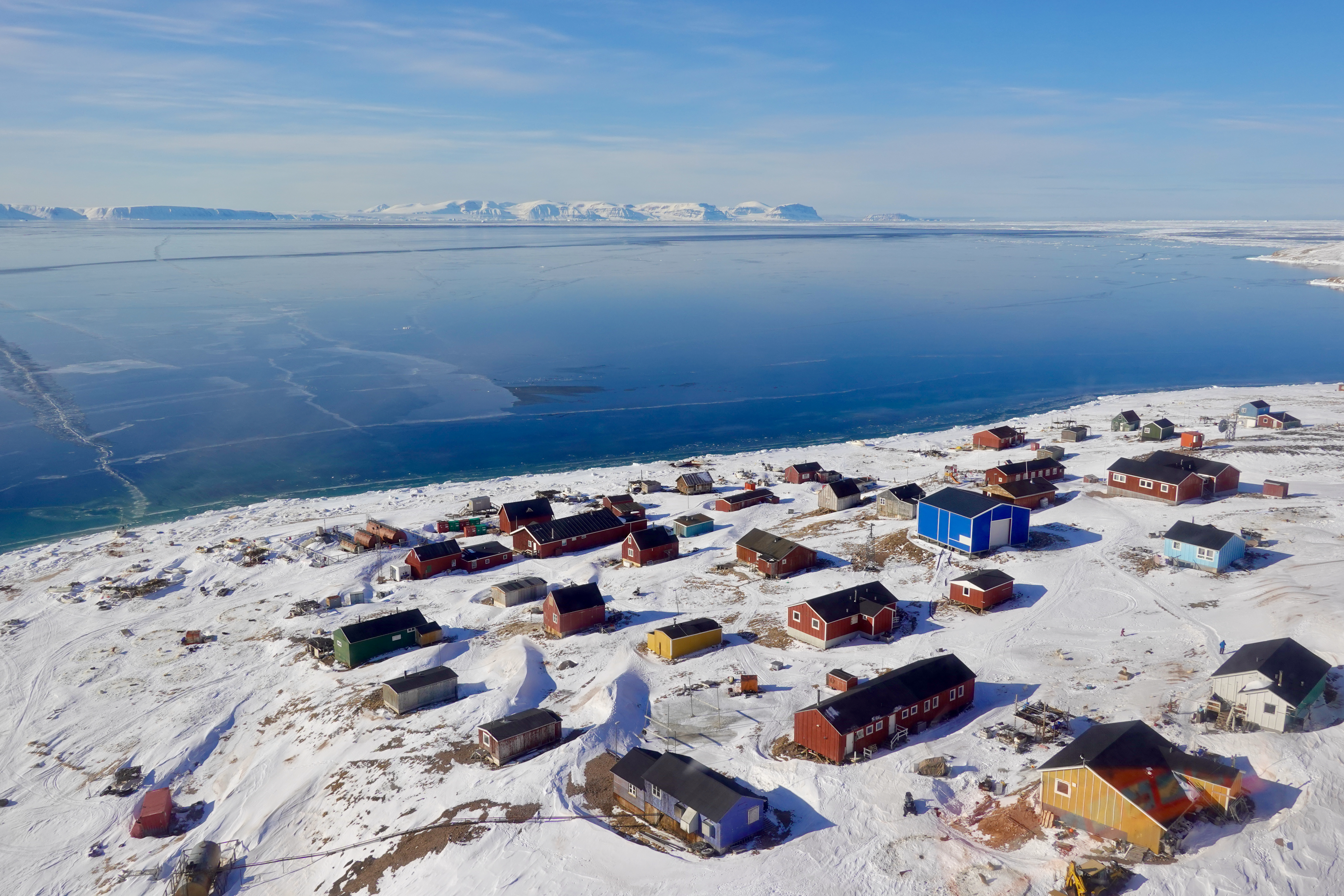
- Views of Siorapaluk (2025)

- Location within Greenland
- Coordinates: 77°47′08″N 70°38′00″W
- Sovereign State: Kingdom of Denmark
- Autonomous territory: Greenland
- Municipality: Avannaata
- Elevation: 61 m (201 ft)

Population (2026)
  - Total: 32
- Time zone: UTC−02:00 (WGT)
  - Summer (DST): UTC−01:00 (WGST)
- Postal code: 3971 Qaanaaq

Siorapaluk (West Greenlandic) or Hiurapaluk (Polar Inuit) is a settlement in the Qaanaaq area of the Avannaata municipality in northern Greenland. The settlement is located in the northern shore of the Siorapaluup Kangerlua (Robertson Fjord). It has a population of 32 who speak the Inuktun language of the Polar Inuit as well as the Kalaallisut dialect of Greenlandic. Many of the inhabitants are direct descendants of the last migration of Inuit from Canada in the 20th century.

Siorapaluk is the northernmost inhabited public settlement in Greenland, and one of the northernmost such settlements in the world, surpassed only by a few villages like Longyearbyen in Svalbard, and Alert, Nunavut which is a military outpost.

== Hunting ==
There is good hunting in the area of the settlement, and the cliffs around it function as breeding grounds for dovekie (UK English: little auk) (Alle alle) and the thick-billed murre (UK English: Brünnich's guillemot) (Uria lomvia). There are many Arctic foxes and Arctic hares in the area and an abundance of seals and walruses which are hunted.

== Infrastructure ==
Siorapaluk has an electrical power plant, direct satellite radio and TV-broadcasting, a well stocked store and telephone service. The settlement's school is combined with its church and a small public library. Although there are no resident medical facilities, the settlement is visited regularly by a physician and a dentist.

== Transport ==
Air Greenland operates settlement flights to Qaanaaq Airport and to Savissivik Heliport via Pituffik Space Base. The distance to Qaanaaq is 45 km. The twice-weekly flights are subsidized by the Government of Greenland. Transfers at the airbase are subject to access restrictions by the Danish Foreign Ministry.

== Population ==
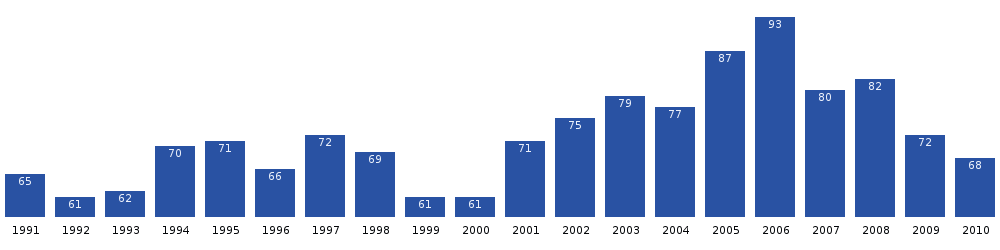
Siorapaluk population growth dynamics in the last two decades. Source: Statistics Greenland
