= Murchison Sound =

Sound in the Avannaata municipality, NW Greenland

- Uummannaq
- Location within Greenland
- Location: NW Greenland
- Coordinates: 77°20′N 71°30′W
- Part of: Arctic Ocean
- Ocean/sea sources: Baffin Bay; Inglefield Gulf
- Basin countries: Greenland
- Max. length: 50 km (31 mi)
- Max. width: 14 km (8.7 mi)
- Frozen: Most of the year
- Islands: Kiatak (Northumberland Island) and Qeqertarsuaq (Herbert Island)

The Murchison Sound (Danish: Murchison Sund; Greenlandic: Uummannaq) is a sound in the Avannaata municipality, NW Greenland. It was named after Scottish geologist Roderick Murchison (1792 – 1871).

== Geography ==
It is a broad channel that runs roughly from northwest to southeast between the mouth of the Inglefield Fjord and Baffin Bay. It is 51.8 km wide between Cape Robertson and Hakluyt Island and its minimum width is 14 km.

The Murchison Sound separates Prudhoe Land and Piulip Nuna —part of the Greenland mainland— to the north from Kiatak (Northumberland Island) and Qeqertarsuaq (Herbert Island) to the south with Cape Cleveland on the northern shore. On the south side of the islands the Whale Sound leads from the Baffin Bay to the Inglefield Fjord.

The Robertson Fjord and the MacCormick Fjord have their mouths on the northern side of the sound.

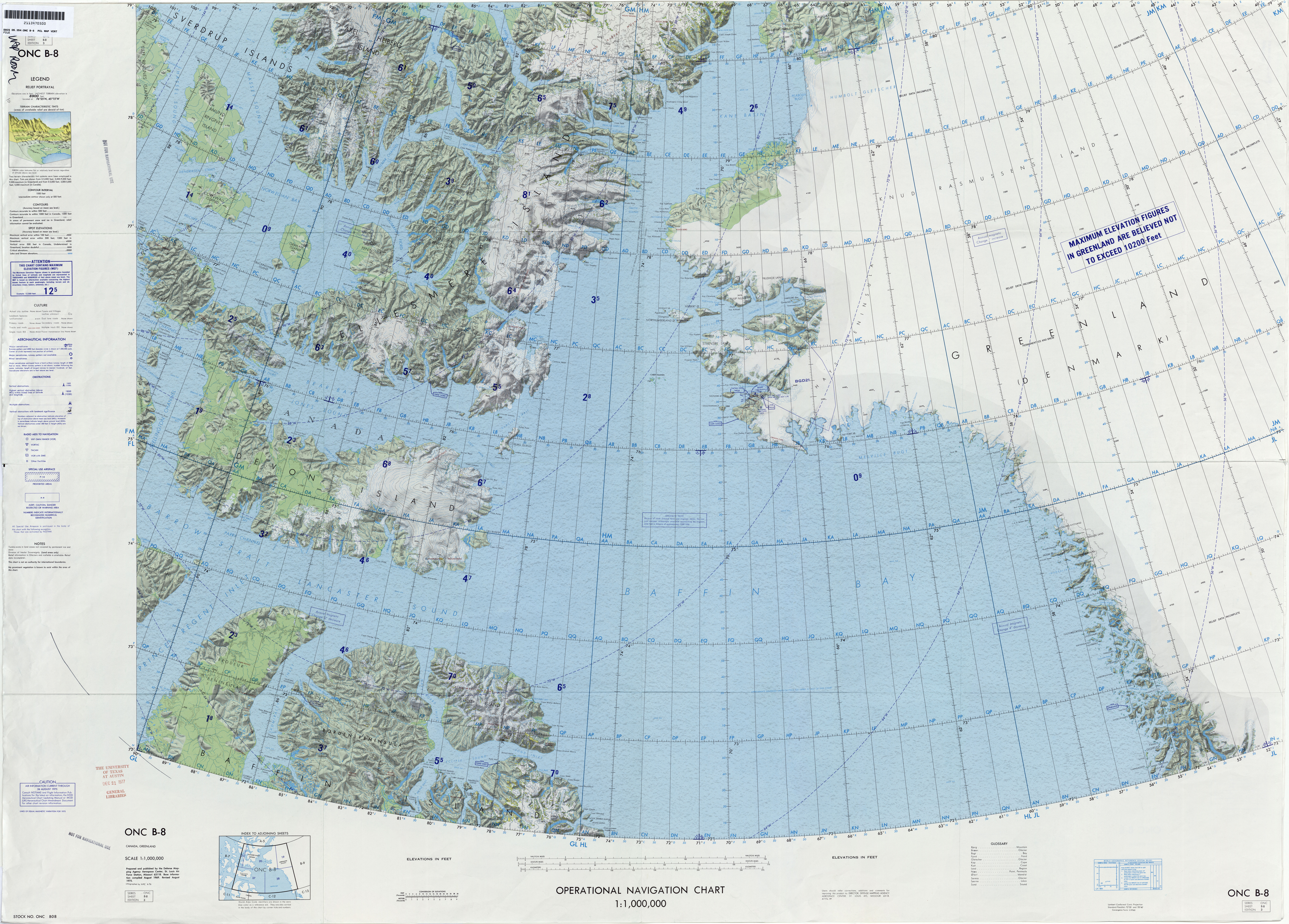
Map of Northwestern Greenland

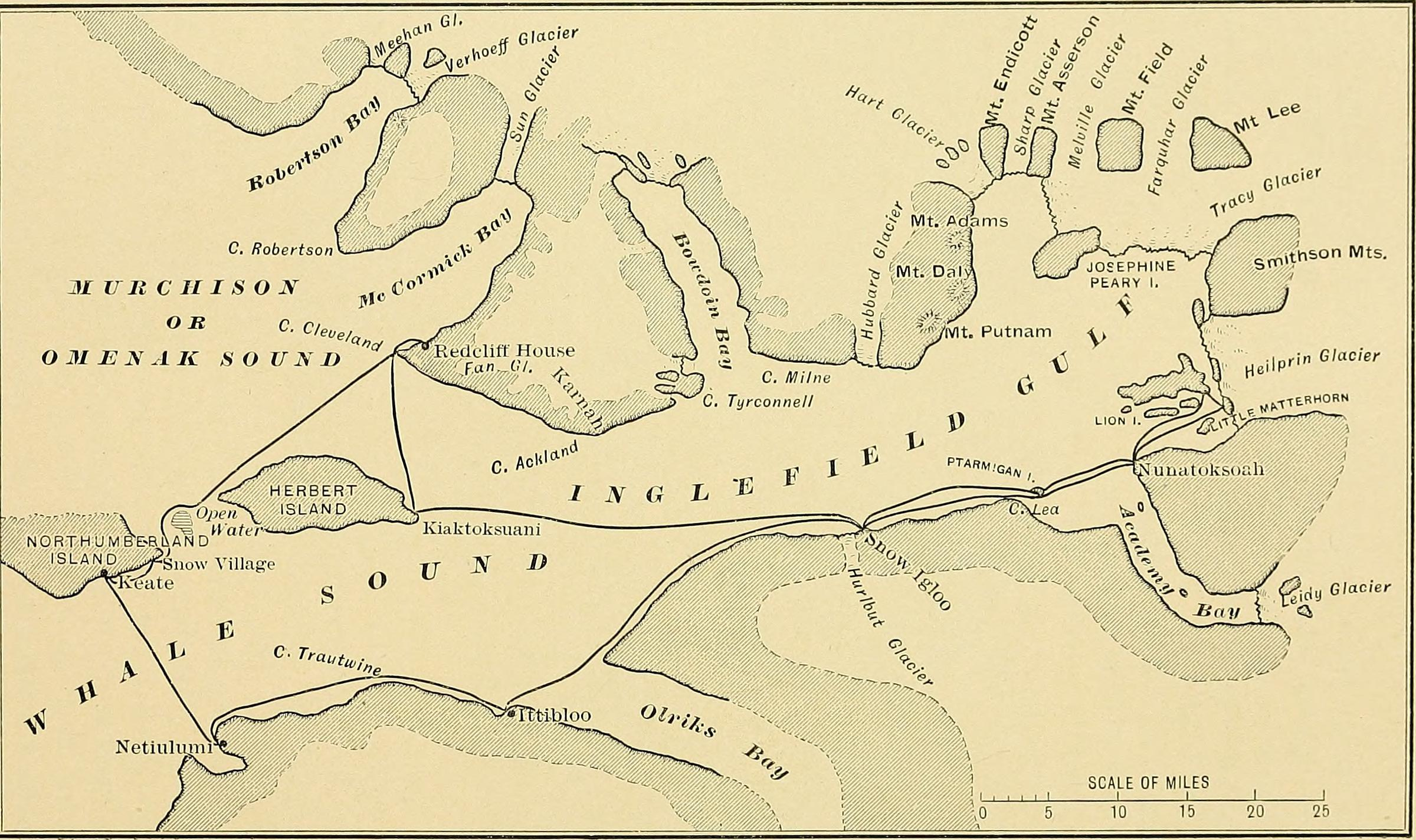
19th century map of the Inglefield Gulf.
