= Academy Glacier (NW Greenland) =

Glacier in Greenland

- Academy Gletscher
- Location within Greenland
- Type: Piedmont glacier
- Location: Greenland
- Coordinates: 77°14′N 65°26′W
- Terminus: Leidy Glacier; Academy Fjord; Inglefield Fjord

Academy Glacier (Danish: Academy Gletscher) is a glacier in northwestern Greenland. Administratively it belongs to the Avannaata municipality.

The glacier was named by Robert Peary after the Philadelphia Academy of Natural Sciences.

== Geography ==
The Academy Glacier is located inland and discharges from the Greenland Ice Sheet into the Leidy Glacier, which bifurcates and has its terminus in the Academy Fjord, as well as in the Olrik Fjord as the smaller Marie Glacier.

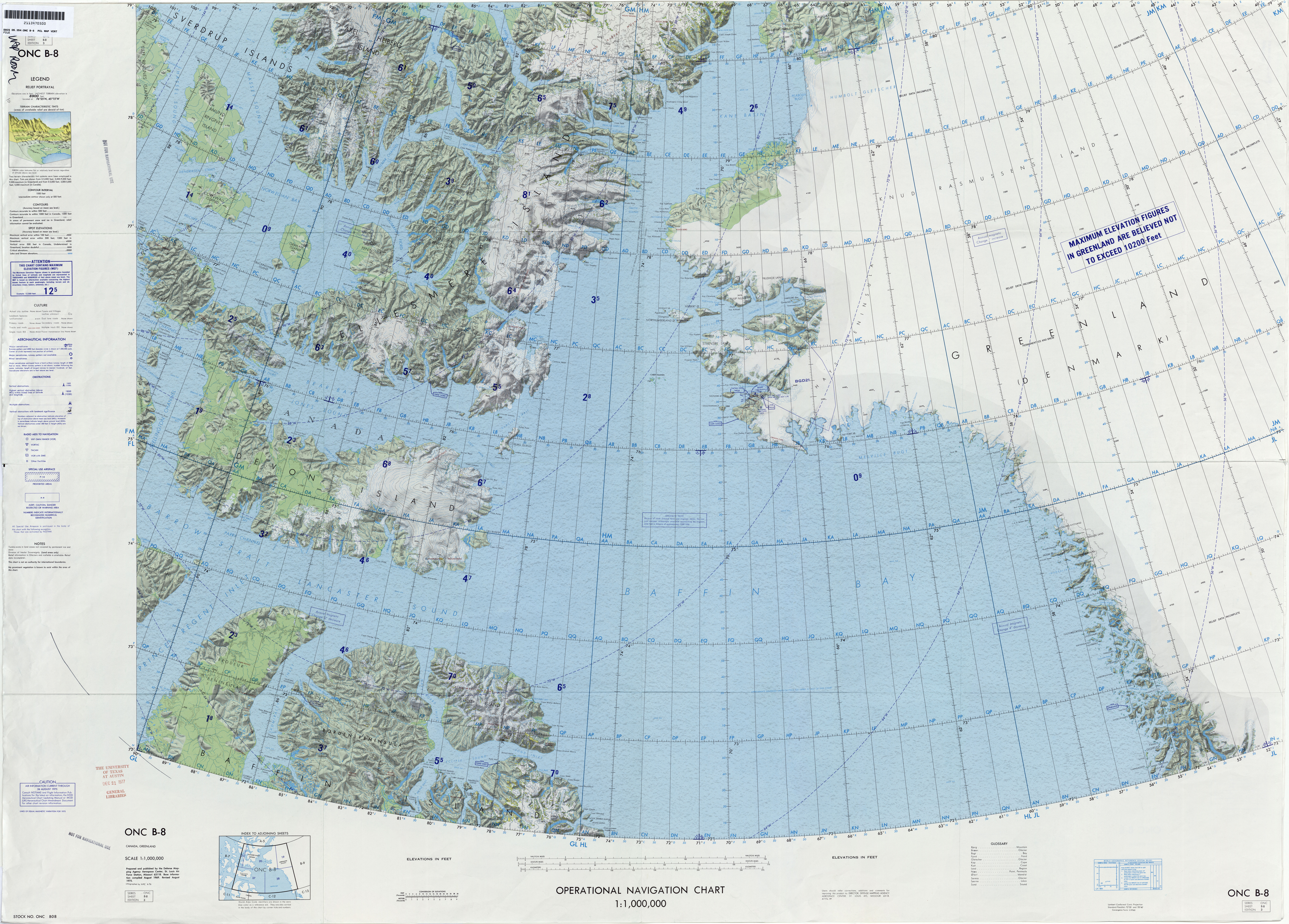
Map of Northwestern Greenland

== See also ==
- List of glaciers in Greenland
- Inglefield Fjord
