= Hart Glacier =

Hart Glacier may refer to the following glaciers:

- Hart Glacier (Antarctica), in Wright Valley, Wilkes Land, Antarctica
- Hart Glacier (Greenland), in the Avannaata municipality of Greenland
