= Hurlbut =

Hurlbut can refer to:

- Hurlbut Township, Logan County, Illinois, US
- Hurlbut Hall, a Harvard College dormitory
- Hurlbut Glacier, Greenland

People with the surname Hurlbut:

- Chauncey Hurlbut (1803–1885), American philanthropist whose will funded Detroit's Hurlbut Memorial Gate
- Doctor Philastus Hurlbut (1809–1883), American Latter Day Saint dissenter
- Edwin Hurlbut (1817–1905), American lawyer and politician
- Jesse Lyman Hurlbut (1843–1930), American clergyman
- Mike Hurlbut (born 1966), American ice hockey player
- Shane Hurlbut (born 1964), American cinematographer
- Spring Hurlbut (born 1952), Canadian artist
- Stephen A. Hurlbut (1815–1882), American politician, diplomat, and commander of the U.S. Army of the Gulf in the American Civil War
- Wendell "Bud" Hurlbut (1918–2011), American engineer and amusement park ride designer
- Wilbur E. Hurlbut (1867–?), American politician from Wisconsin
- William B. Hurlbut (born 1945), American neurobiologist and consulting professor at Stanford University
- William J. Hurlbut (1883–1957), American screenplay writer best known for the Bride of Frankenstein screenplay
