= Leidy Glacier =

Glacier in Greenland

- Leidy Gletscher
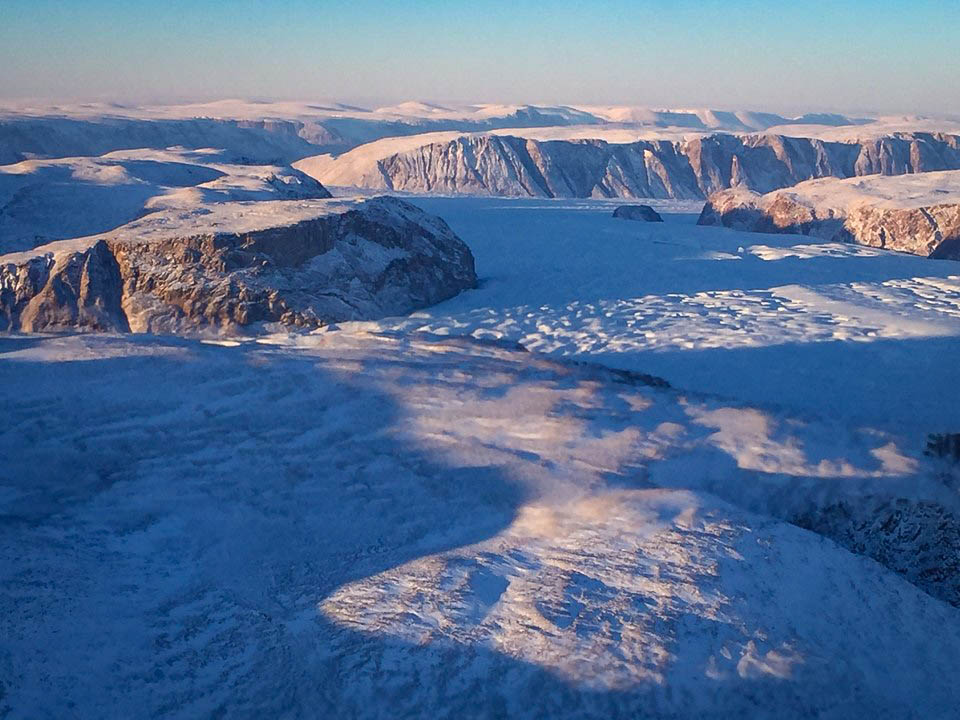
- Leidy Glacier as seen during an Operation IceBridge flight on 22 March 2017. Credit:NASA/Nathan Kurtz

- Location within Greenland
- Type: Tidal outlet glacier
- Location: Greenland
- Coordinates: 77°16′N 66°2′W
- Width: 4 km (2.5 mi)
- Terminus: Academy Fjord; Inglefield Fjord; Baffin Bay
- Status: Retreating

Leidy Glacier (Danish: Leidy Gletscher), is a glacier in northwestern Greenland. Administratively it belongs to the Avannaata municipality.

This glacier was named by Robert Peary after paleontologist, parasitologist, and anatomist Joseph Leidy (1823 – 1891), member of the Philadelphia Academy of Natural Sciences.

== Geography ==
The Leidy Glacier discharges from the Greenland Ice Sheet through the Academy Glacier.

The glacier flows roughly from SE to NW and, after forming an unusual cross pattern, it has its terminus at the head of the Academy Fjord to the northwest and, as the Marie Glacier, at the head of the Olrik Fjord to the southwest.

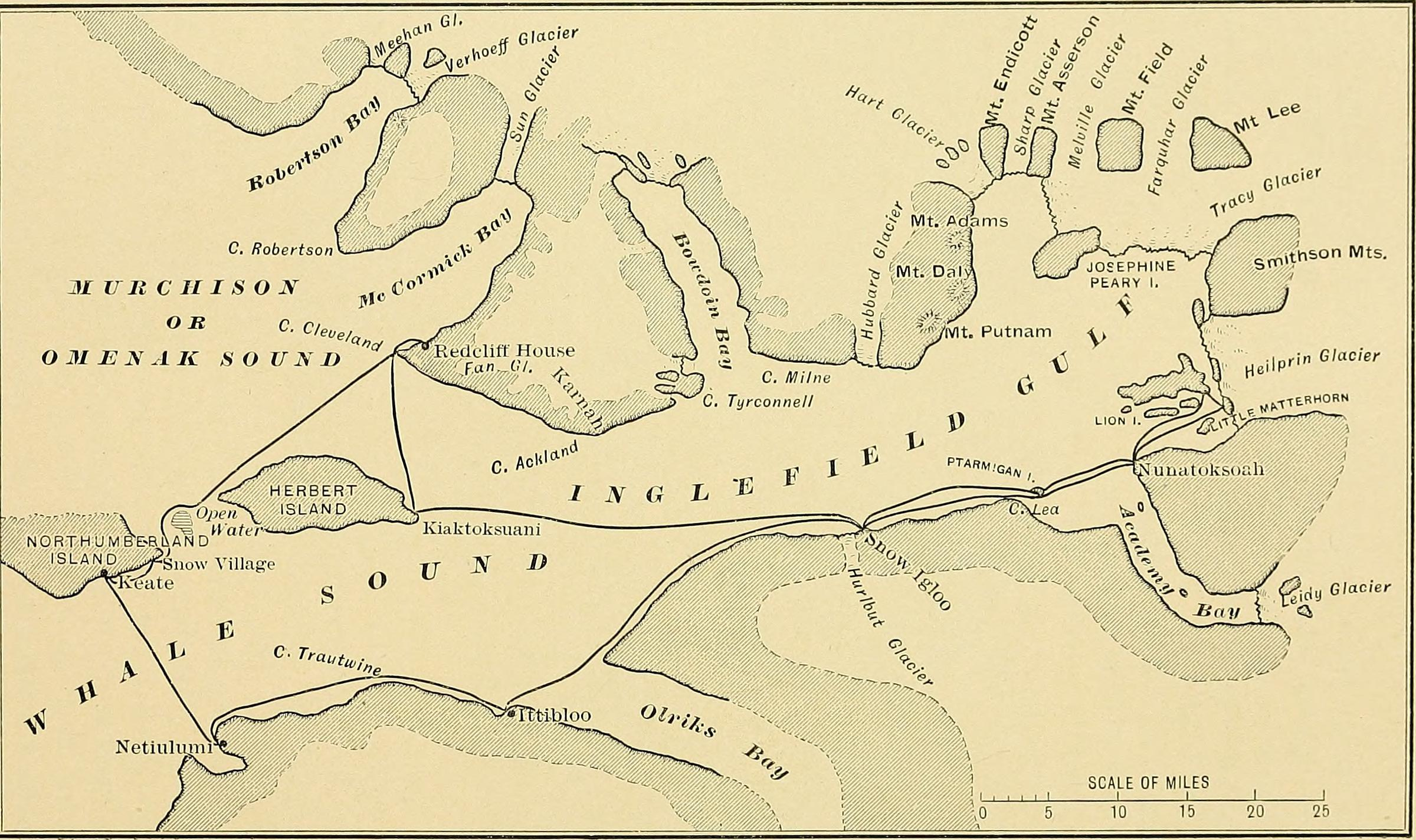
19th century map of the Inglefield Gulf.

== See also ==
- List of glaciers in Greenland
- Inglefield Fjord
