= Tracy Glacier (Greenland) =

Glacier in Avannaata, Greenland

- Tracy Gletscher
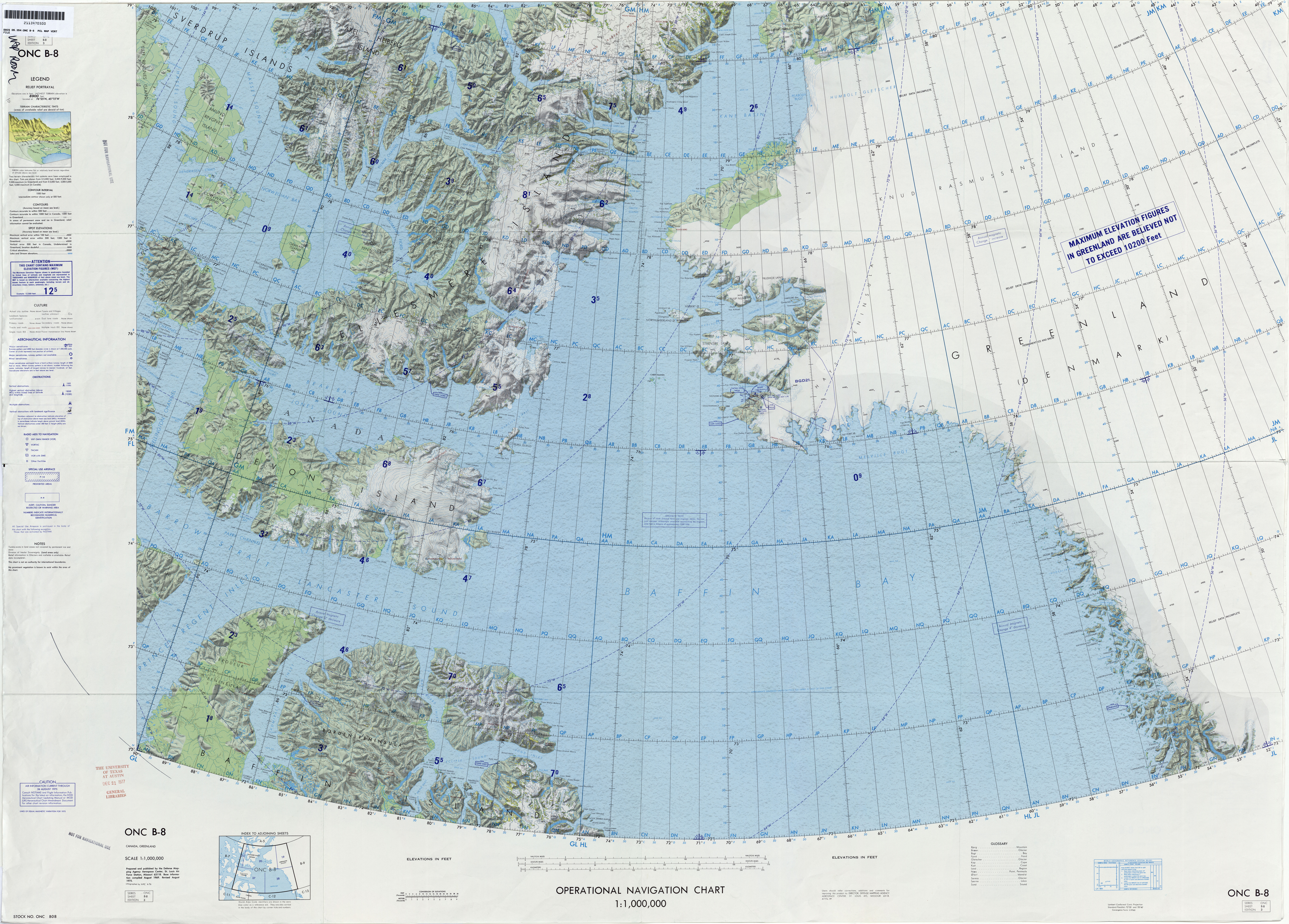
- Map of Northwestern Greenland

- Location within Greenland
- Type: Tidal outlet glacier
- Location: Greenland
- Coordinates: 77°39′N 66°2′W
- Width: 4 km (2.5 mi)
- Terminus: Inglefield Fjord; Baffin Bay
- Status: Retreating

Tracy Glacier (Danish: Tracy Gletscher), is a glacier in northwestern Greenland. Administratively it belongs to the Avannaata municipality.

This glacier was named by Robert Peary after Benjamin F. Tracy (1830 – 1915), United States Secretary of the Navy, who granted him three years' leave in order to engage in Arctic explorations.

== Geography ==
The Tracy Glacier discharges from the Greenland Ice Sheet into the head of the Inglefield Fjord just east of Josephine Peary Island. Its terminus lies between two nunataks. Mount Lee, the northern one, separates it from the Farquhar Glacier to the northwest and a larger nunatak, the Smithson Range, separates it from the Heilprin Glacier to the south.

Although the Tracy Glacier is contiguous to the Heilprin Glacier, both glaciers have a different nature, a fact which has been a source of puzzlement for scientists for over a century.

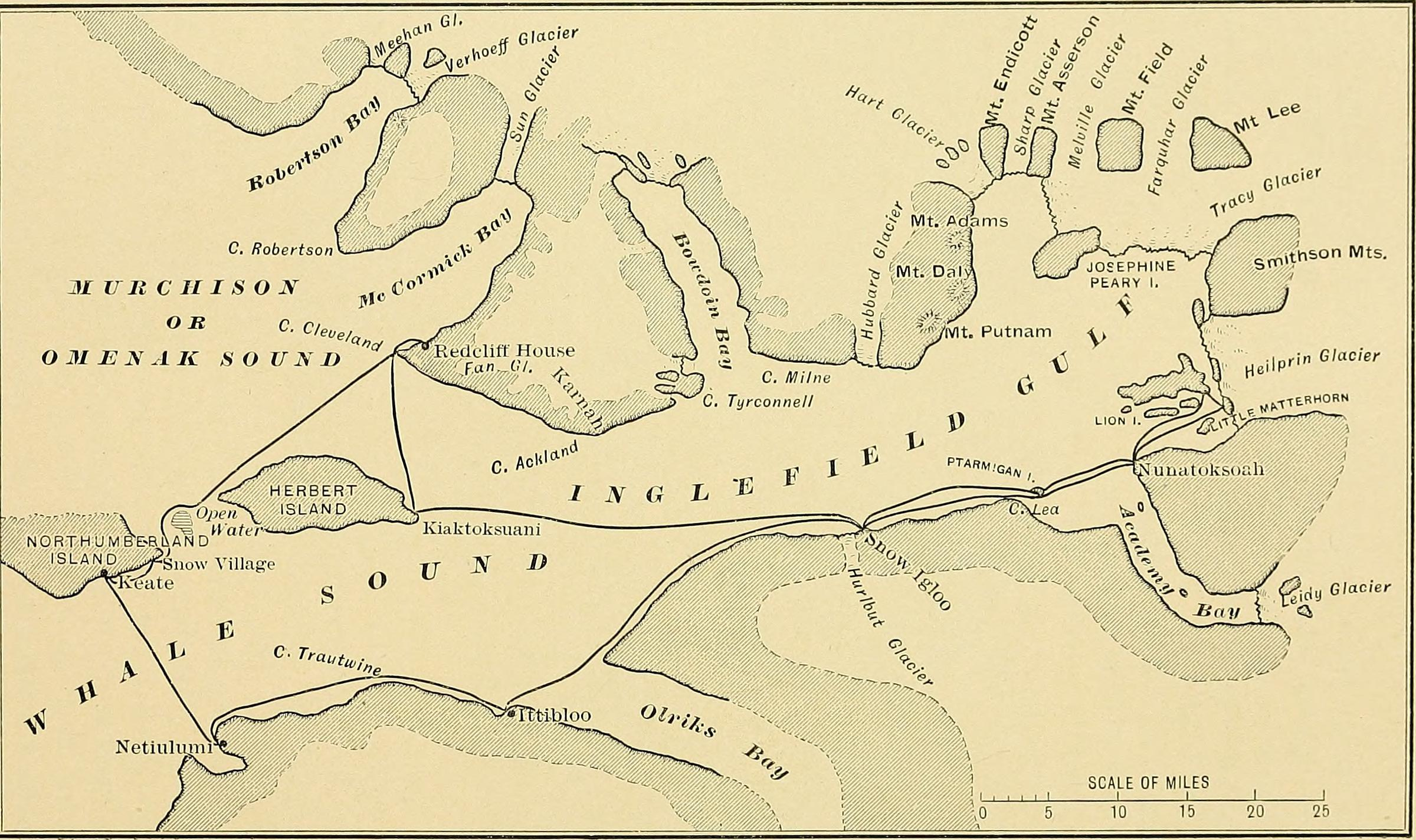
19th century map of the Inglefield Gulf.

== See also ==
- List of glaciers in Greenland
- Inglefield Fjord
