= Heilprin Glacier =

Glacier in Greenland

- Heilprin Gletscher
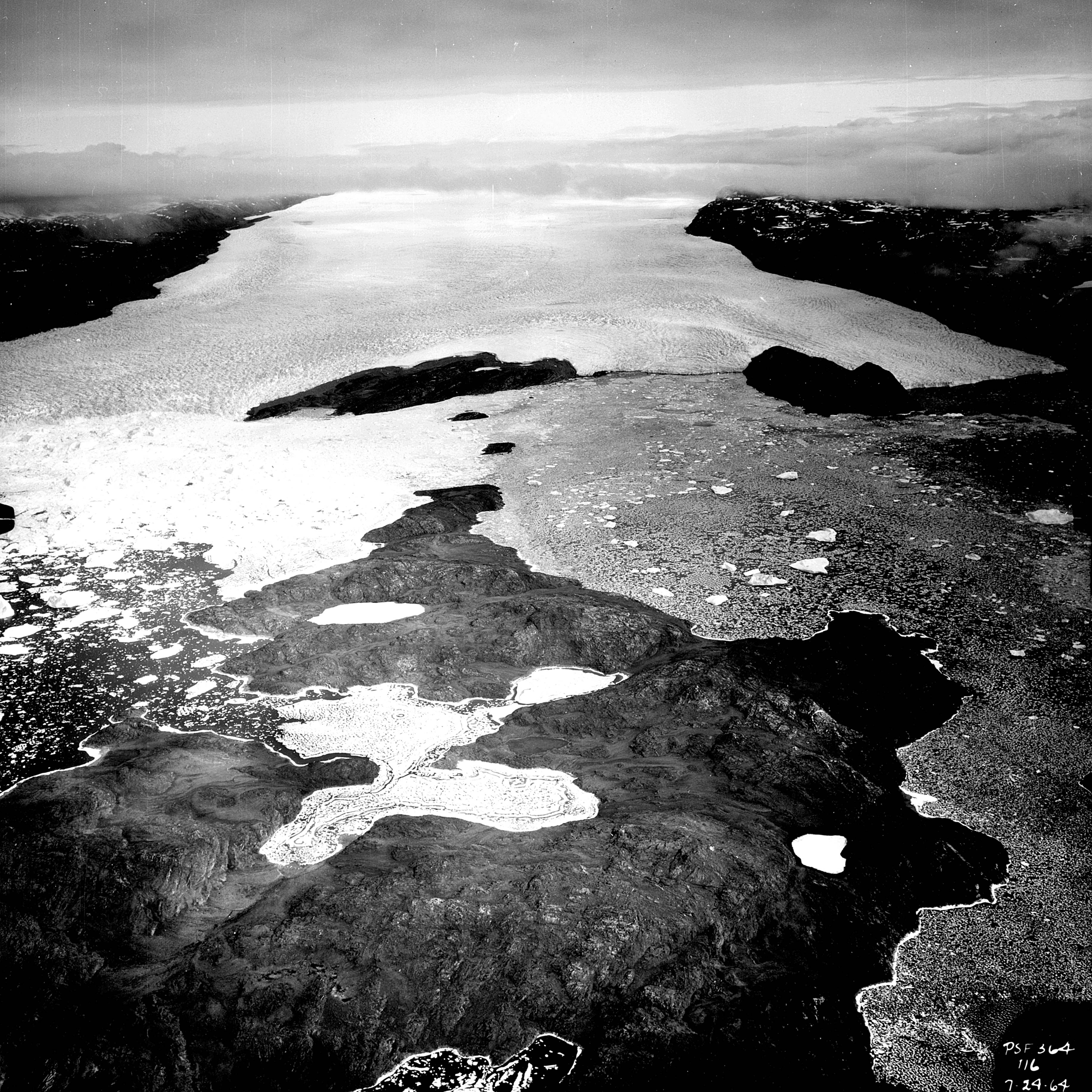
- View of Heilprin Glacier

- Location within Greenland
- Type: Tidal outlet glacier
- Location: Greenland
- Coordinates: 77°31′N 65°40′W
- Width: 8 km (5.0 mi)
- Terminus: Inglefield Fjord; Baffin Bay
- Status: Retreating

Heilprin Glacier (Danish: Heilprin Gletscher), is a glacier in northwestern Greenland. Administratively it belongs to the Avannaata municipality.

This glacier was named by Robert Peary after geologist, paleontologist and naturalist Angelo Heilprin (1853 – 1907), curator of the Philadelphia Academy of Natural Sciences, who took part in the Peary expedition to Greenland of 1891–92.

== Geography ==
The Heilprin Glacier discharges from the Greenland Ice Sheet into the head of the Inglefield Fjord just east of the Harvard Islands and northeast of Quajaqqisaarsuaq. Its terminus lies between the Smithson Range nunatak that separates it from the Tracy Glacier to the north, and Nunatarsuaq, a plateau dotted with lakes to the south. Both neighboring glaciers drain roughly 12,000 km^{2} (4,600 sq mi) of the Greenland Ice Sheet.

Although the Heilprin Glacier is contiguous to the Tracy Glacier, both glaciers have a different nature, a fact which has been a source of puzzlement for scientists for over a century.

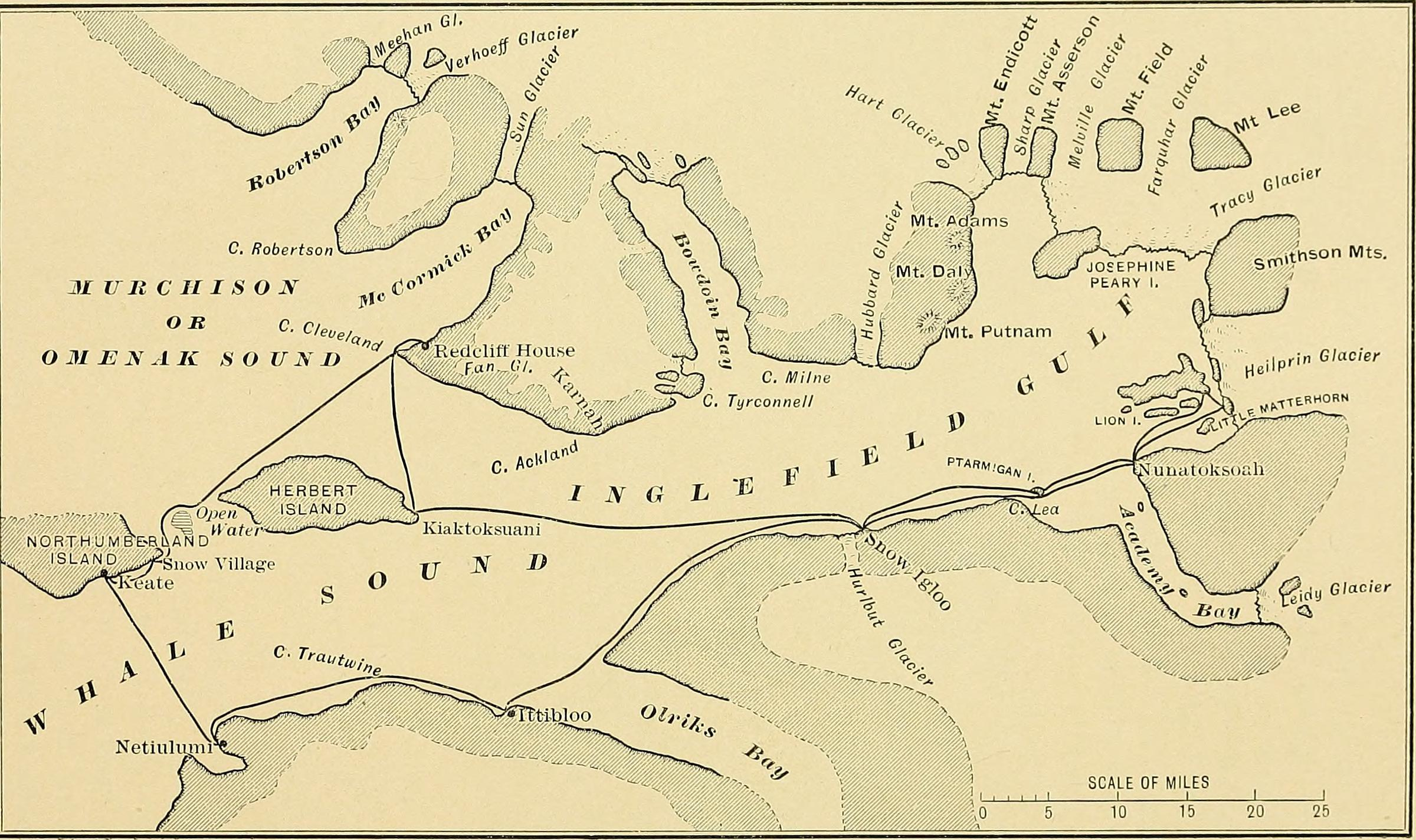
19th century map of the Inglefield Gulf.

== See also ==
- List of glaciers in Greenland
- Inglefield Fjord
