= Norman von Heldreich Farquhar =

American admiral (1840–1907)

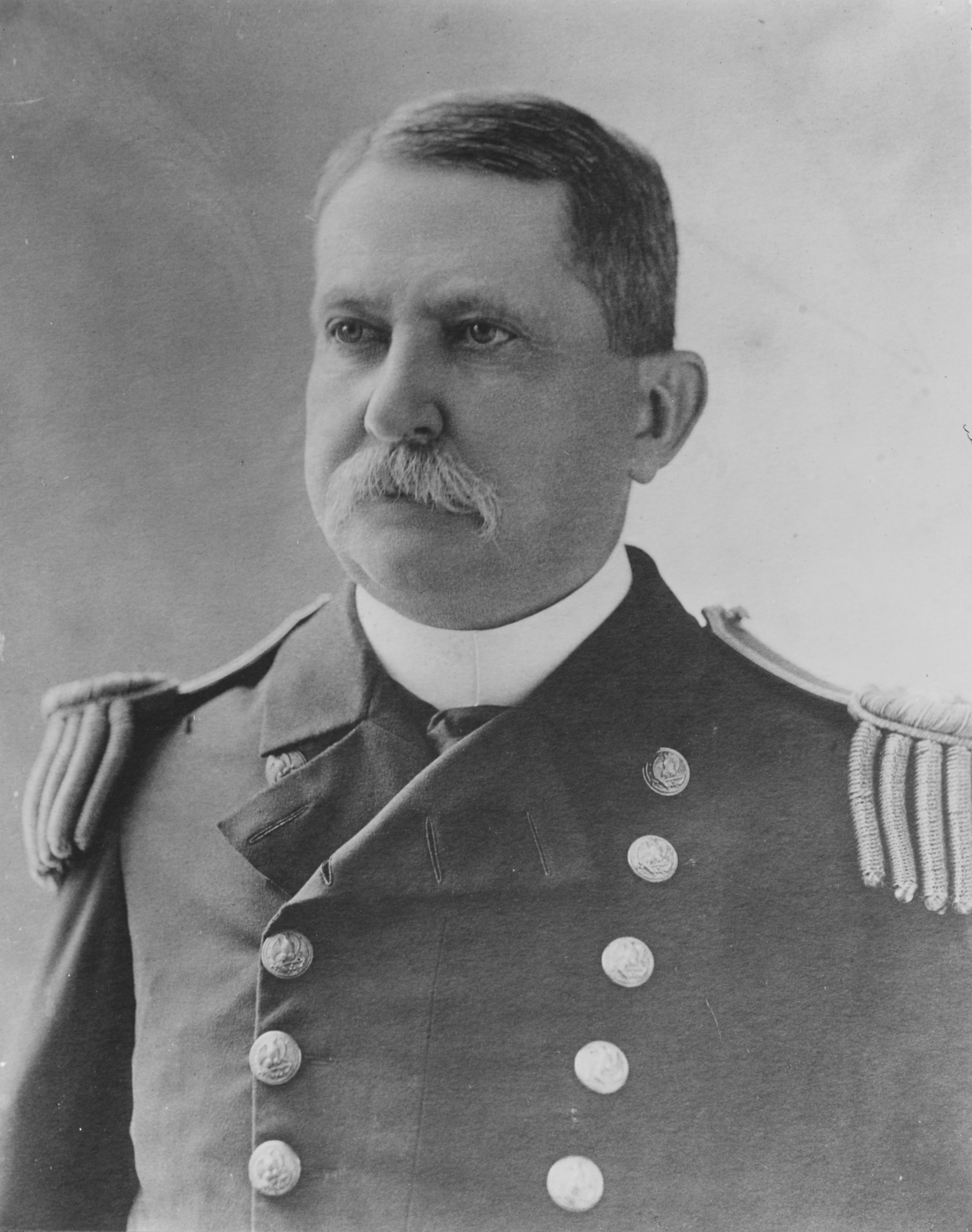
- Captain Farquhar
- Born: April 11, 1840; Pottsville, Pennsylvania, US
- Died: July 3, 1907 (aged 67); Jamestown, Rhode Island, US
- Burial place: Arlington National Cemetery
- Military career
- Allegiance: United States of America
- Branch: United States Navy
- Service years: 1859–1902
- Rank: Rear Admiral
- Commands: Triton; USS Kansas; USS Santee; USS Portsmouth; USS Quinnebaug; USS Wyoming; USS Constellation; USS Trenton; Bureau of Yards and Docks; League Island Navy Yard; USS Newark; Norfolk Navy Yard; North Atlantic Squadron
- Conflicts: American Civil War

Rear Admiral Norman von Heldreich Farquhar (April 11, 1840 – July 3, 1907) was an officer in the United States Navy during the American Civil War. He is best known for commanding a naval squadron which was wrecked with three German warships at Apia, Samoa, in 1889.

== Biography ==
Born in Pottsville, Pennsylvania, Farquhar entered the United States Naval Academy in 1855. After graduating from the Naval Academy in June 1859, he served with the Africa Squadron until September 1860 when he sailed the prize slaver Triton home to the United States.

Lieutenant Farquhar spent most of the Civil War off the U.S. Atlantic coast and in the West Indies, serving in the gunboats Mystic, Sonoma and Mahaska, and the cruiser Rhode Island. At the close of the war, he was executive officer of the gunboat Santiago de Cuba. He was promoted to the rank of lieutenant commander in August 1865, a few months after the fighting ended, and was on duty at the U.S. Naval Academy from then until September 1868. For the rest of the 1860s and into the next decade, Farquhar served in the screw sloop Swatara, was executive officer of the sloop Severn and the frigate Powhatan, and commanding officer of the gunboat Kansas. He also had two tours at the Boston Navy Yard on ordnance duty and as executive officer.

Advanced in rank to commander in December 1872, Farquhar spent nearly five years at the Naval Academy, which included command of the gunnery training ship Santee. He commanded the training ship Portsmouth in 1877–78, and the steam sloops Quinnebaug and Wyoming in European waters in 1878–1881. Five more years of Naval Academy duty, including service as the commandant of midshipmen and command of the training ship Constellation, were followed by torpedo instruction at Newport, Rhode Island, in 1886.

In March 1886, Farquhar was promoted to captain. From May 1887 until her loss in the March 1889 Samoan hurricane, he commanded the steam frigate Trenton. Farquhar was commended for his fine handling of his ship during that disastrous 1889 hurricane at Apia, Samoa, in which she and a number of other American and foreign naval vessels were lost.

He then served on several of the Navy's boards and, in March 1890 became the chief of the Bureau of Yards and Docks. During 1894–97, he was commandant of the League Island Navy Yard, commanding officer of the cruiser Newark, and president of the Naval Examining Board.

While holding the ranks of commodore and rear admiral, Farquhar was commandant of the Norfolk Navy Yard in 1897–99, commanded the North Atlantic Squadron during 1899–1901 and was chairman of the Lighthouse Board in 1901–02.

Admiral Farquhar was a companion of the Military Order of the Loyal Legion of the United States (insignia number 9937) and a member of the Naval Order of the United States.

Rear Admiral Farquhar retired on April 11, 1902, having reached the mandatory retirement age of sixty-two. He had his winter residence in Washington, D.C. and died at his summer residence in Jamestown, Rhode Island, on July 3, 1907. Farquhar was buried in Section 1 of Arlington National Cemetery. His wife, Addie Whelan Pope Farquhar (1845–1909), is buried with him.

== Namesake ==
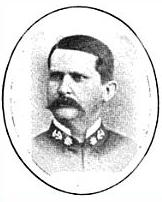
RADM Norman von Heldreich Farquhar

Two ships have been named USS Farquhar for him.

The Farquhar Glacier in Greenland was named after him by Robert Peary.

Military offices
Preceded by William T. Sampson	Commander-in-Chief, North Atlantic Squadron; October 1899–1 May 1901	Succeeded by Francis J. Higginson
