= Melville Glacier (Greenland) =

Glacier in Greenland

- Melville Gletscher
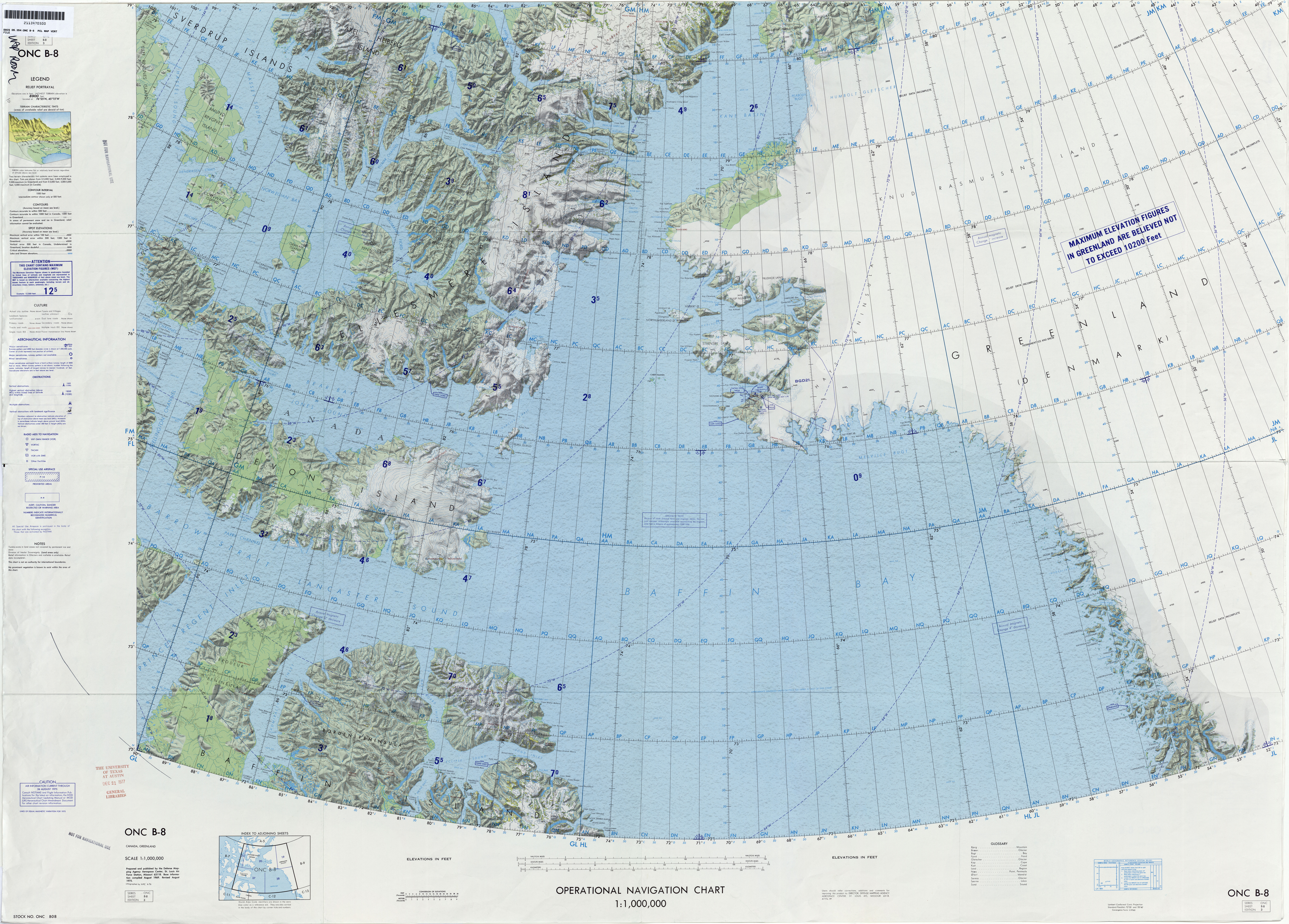
- Map of Northwestern Greenland

- Location within Greenland
- Type: Tidal outlet glacier
- Location: Greenland
- Coordinates: 77°44′N 66°39′W
- Width: 2 km (1.2 mi)
- Terminus: Inglefield Fjord; Baffin Bay
- Status: Retreating

Melville Glacier (Danish: Melville Gletscher), is a glacier in northwestern Greenland. Administratively it belongs to the Avannaata municipality.

This glacier was named by Robert Peary after Chief Engineer George W. Melville (1841 – 1912), Chief of the Bureau of Steam Engineering.

== Geography ==
The Melville Glacier discharges from the Greenland Ice Sheet and has its terminus in the northern side of the head of the Inglefield Fjord just north of Josephine Peary Island. Its last stretch lies between two nunataks: Mount Lee in the east separates it from the Farquhar Glacier to the east, and Mount Asserson, in the west, separates it from the Sharp Glacier to the west.

The Melville Glacier flows roughly from NE to SW. In the same manner as its neighboring glaciers, it has retreated by approximately 1 km (0.62 mi) in the period between the 1980s and 2014.

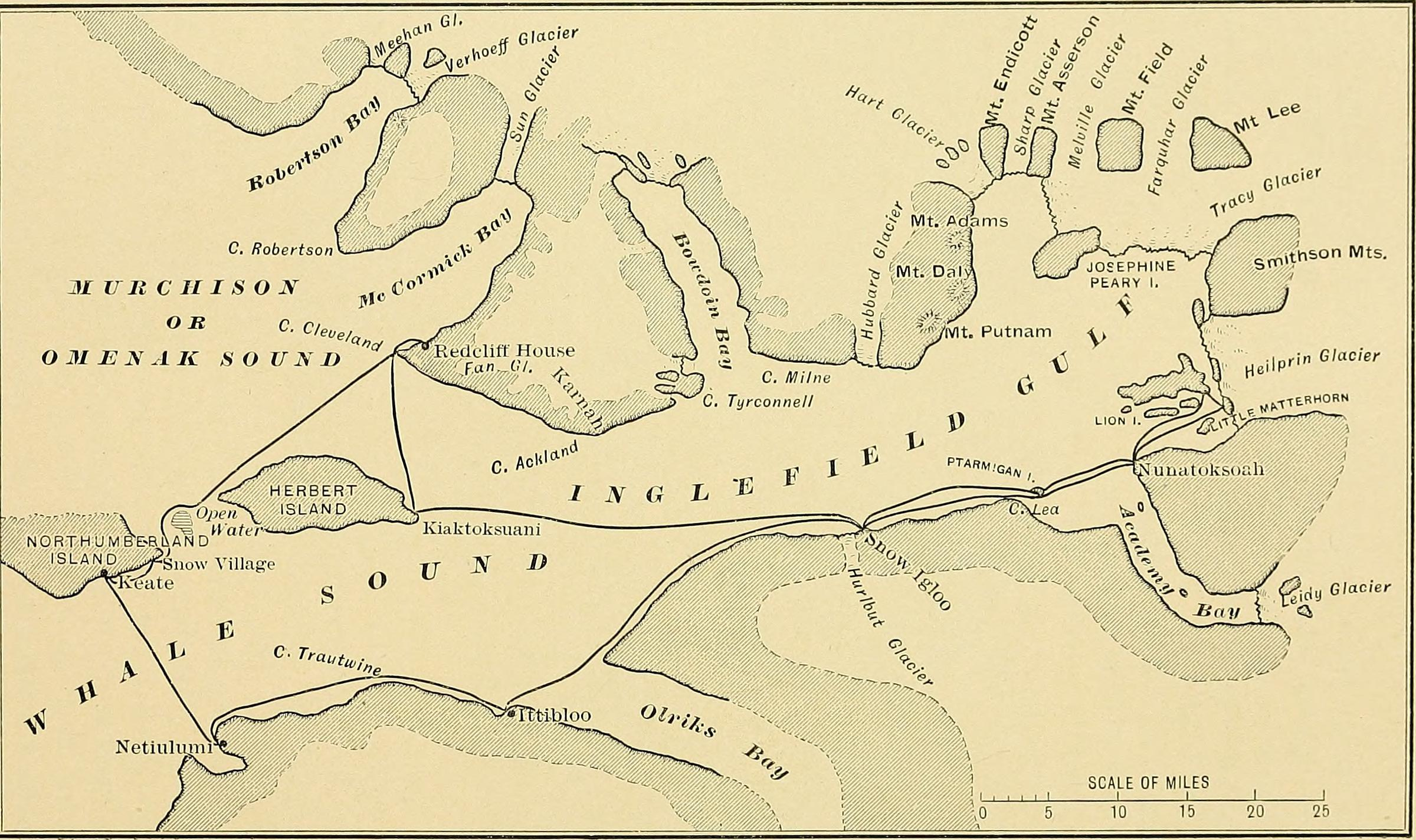
19th century map of the Inglefield Gulf.

== See also ==
- List of glaciers in Greenland
- Inglefield Fjord
