= Qeqertat =

- Location within Greenland
- Coordinates: 77°29′39″N 66°41′05″W
- State: Kingdom of Denmark
- Constituent country: Greenland
- Municipality: Avannaata

Population (2026)
  - Total: 25
- Time zone: UTC−02:00 (Western Greenland Time)
  - Summer (DST): UTC−01:00 (Western Greenland Summer Time)
- Postal code: 3971 Qaanaaq

Qeqertat is a small village in the Qaanaaq area of the Avannaata municipality, in northern Greenland. It is located on the Harvard islands, in the inner Inglefield Fjord, approximately 63 km (39 mi) east of Qaanaaq. The village had 25 inhabitants in 2026. It is one of the most northern settlements in Greenland and in the world. Qeqertat means "the islands" in the Inuit language.

The local economy relies heavily on traditional Inuit hunting for narwhal, seals, and walrus. Qeqertat is also known as a good place for halibut fishing, with the largest and most abundant Greenland halibut found in the fjord nearby.

The town has no independent water supply. Instead, the townsfolk must get their water from nearby rivers and lakes, or, in winter, collect sea ice to melt.

== Population ==
The population of Qeqertat has been stable in the last two decades. After registering a decline in the '90s, the population grew to 30 in 2010, before declining again to 23 in 2019.

A 70-year-old resident of the village, interviewed by Gretel Ehrlich in her 2021 book Unsolaced, said that the village had a much larger population when she was a child. A 1984 National Geographic article stated that the population of the town had recently fallen from 50 to about 20. The town in 1984 consisted of 11 houses, a store, a school and a chapel.

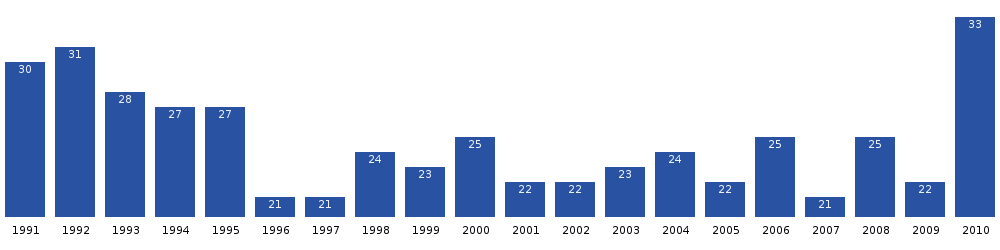
Qeqertat population growth dynamics in the last two decades. Source: Statistics Greenland
