= Harvard Islands =

Island group in Avannaata, Greenland

- Location within Greenland

Geography
- Location: NW Greenland
- Coordinates: 77°29′50″N 66°26′00″W

Administration
- Greenland
- Municipality: Avannaata

Demographics
- Population: 33 (2010)
- Ethnic groups: Greenlandic Inuit

The Harvard Islands (Danish: Harward Øer) are an island group east of Qaanaaq in the Avannaata Municipality, northwestern Greenland.

They are located near the head of the Inglefield Fjord, north of the mouth of the Academy Fjord and just east of the terminus of the Heilprin Glacier. The village of Qeqertat is located on the islands.

== See also ==
- List of islands of Greenland
