= Hubbard Glacier (Greenland) =

Glacier in northwestern Greenland

- Hubbard Gletscher; Hubbard Bræ; Quinnisut Sermiat / Quinisut Sermiat
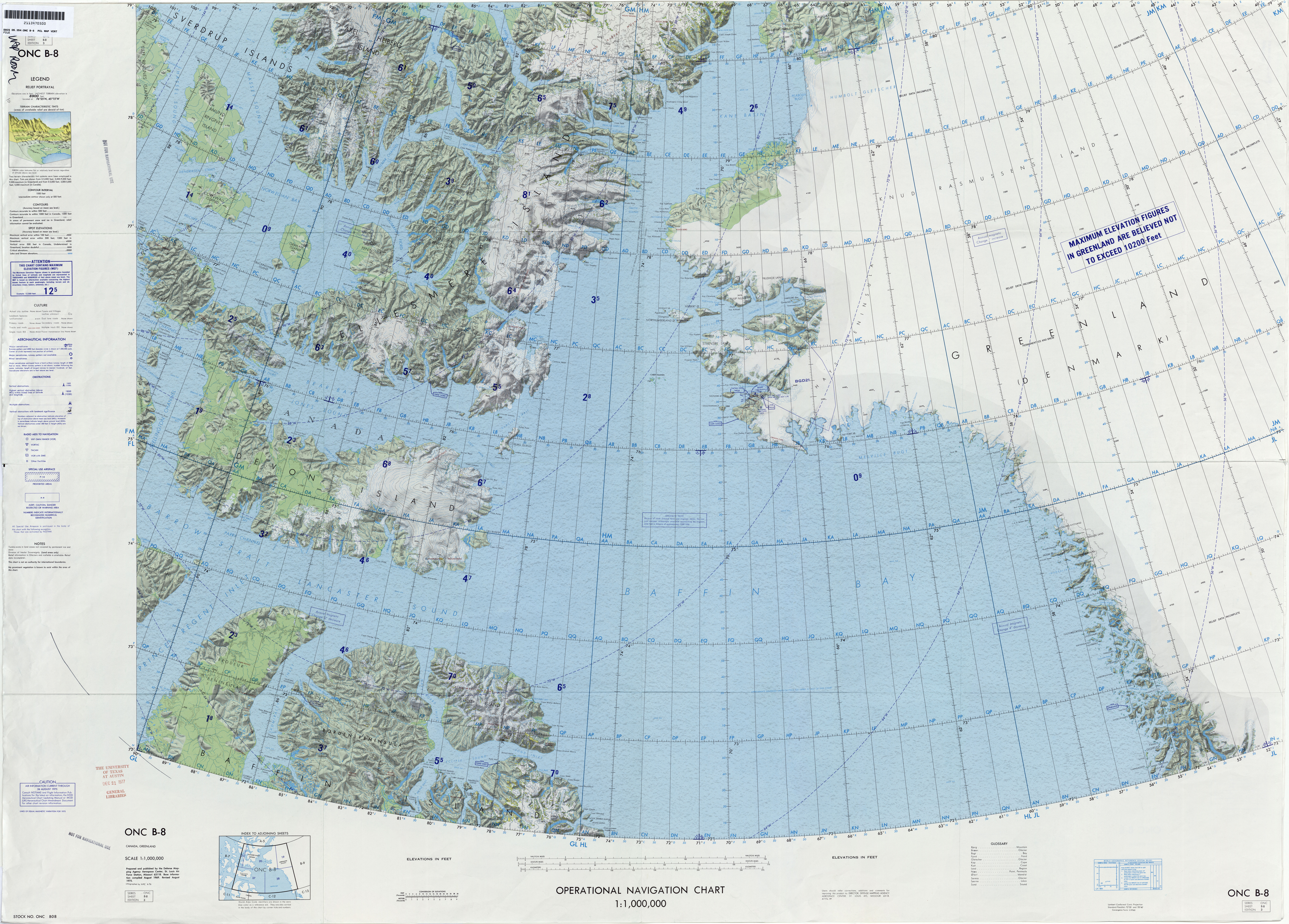
- Map of Northwestern Greenland

- Location within Greenland
- Type: Valley glacier
- Location: Greenland
- Coordinates: 77°33′N 67°45′W
- Width: 2.5 km (1.6 mi)
- Terminus: Inglefield Fjord; Baffin Bay
- Status: Retreating

Hubbard Glacier (Danish: Hubbard Gletscher, Greenlandic: Quinnisut Sermiat or Quinisut Sermiat), is a glacier in northwestern Greenland. Administratively it belongs to the Avannaata municipality.

This glacier was named by Robert Peary after Gardiner Greene Hubbard (1822 – 1897), founder and first president of the American Geographical Society.

== Geography ==
The Hubbard Glacier has its terminus in the northern shore of the mid Inglefield Fjord. It discharges from the margins of the Greenland Ice Sheet in Prudhoe Land, flowing roughly from north to south.

In the same manner as most neighboring glaciers, it has retreated by approximately 0.75 km (0.47 mi) in recent years.

An abandoned Inughuit settlement, Quinisut, lies directly southeast of the glacier. It was abandoned in 1952.

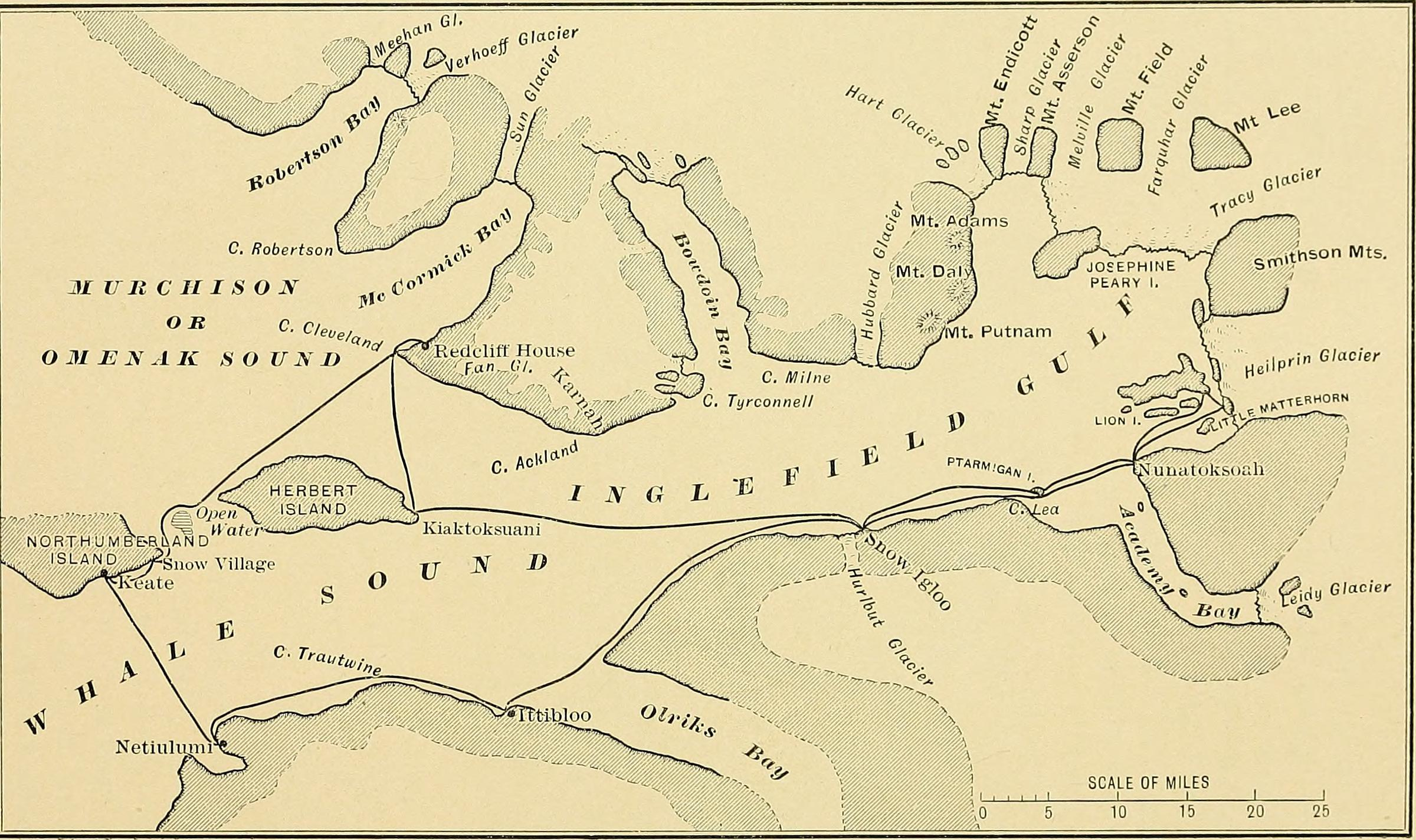
19th century map of the Inglefield Gulf.

== Bibliography ==
- Geological Survey of Denmark and Greenland Map Series 2
- Deeply incised submarine glacial valleys beneath the Greenland ice

== See also ==
- List of glaciers in Greenland
- Inglefield Fjord
