= Sharp Glacier (Greenland) =

Glacier in Greenland

- Sharp Gletscher
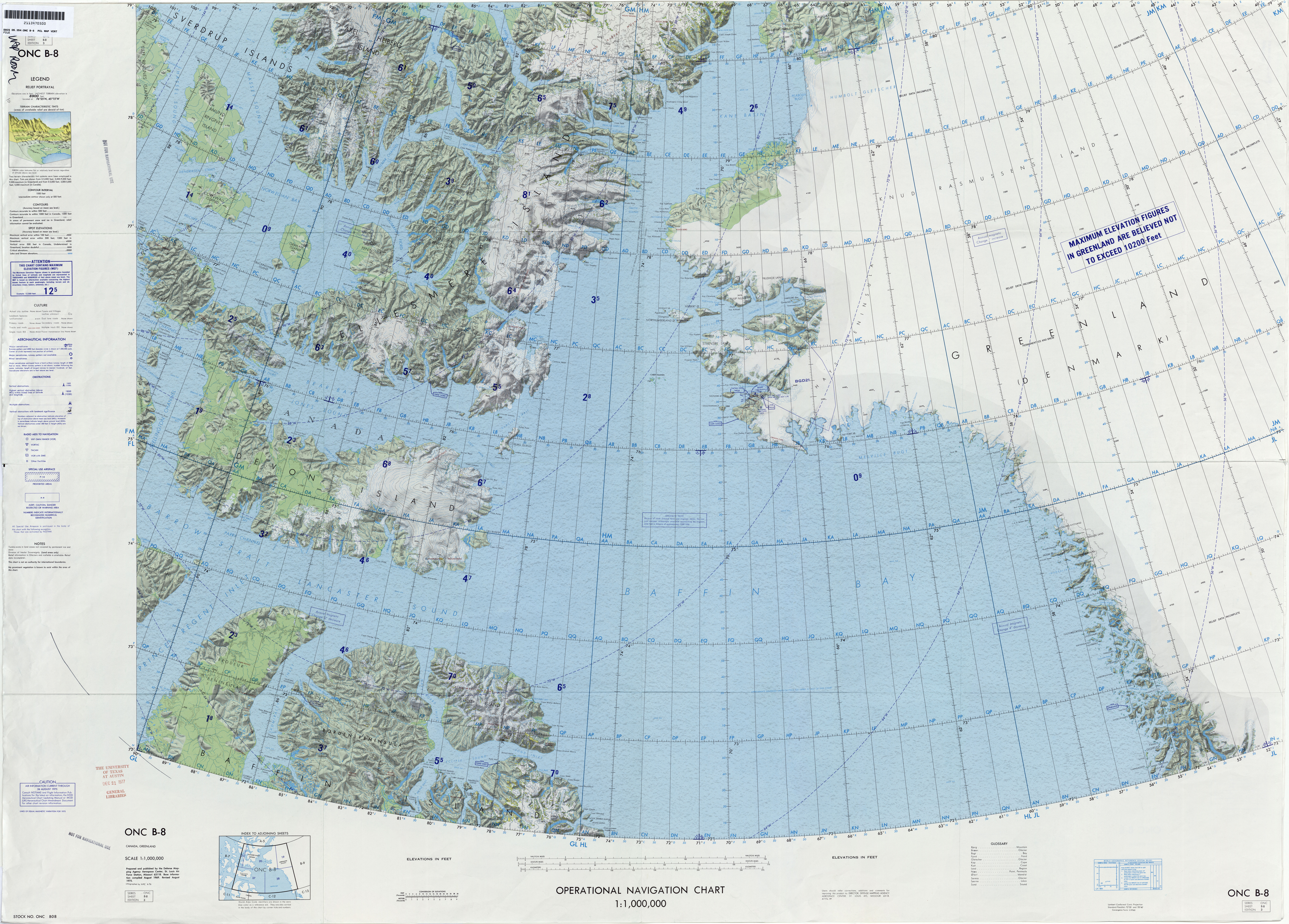
- Map of Northwestern Greenland

- Location within Greenland
- Type: Tidal outlet glacier
- Location: Greenland
- Coordinates: 77°42′N 66°58′W
- Width: 2 km (1.2 mi)
- Terminus: Inglefield Fjord; Baffin Bay
- Status: Retreating

Sharp Glacier (Danish: Sharp Gletscher), is a glacier in northwestern Greenland. Administratively it belongs to the Avannaata municipality.

This glacier was named by Robert Peary after Benjamin Sharp (1858 – 1915), zoologist of the Philadelphia Academy of Natural Sciences who took part in the Peary expedition to Greenland of 1891-1892.

== Geography ==
The Sharp Glacier discharges from the Greenland Ice Sheet and has its terminus in the northern side of the head of the Inglefield Fjord, NNW of Josephine Peary Island. Its last stretch lies between two nunataks: Mount Endicott in the western side, separating it from the Hart Glacier to the west. and Mount Asserson in the eastern side, separating it from the Melville Glacier to the east.

The Sharp Glacier flows roughly from north to south. In the same manner as its neighboring glaciers, it has retreated by approximately 1 km (0.62 mi) in the period between the 1980s and 2014.

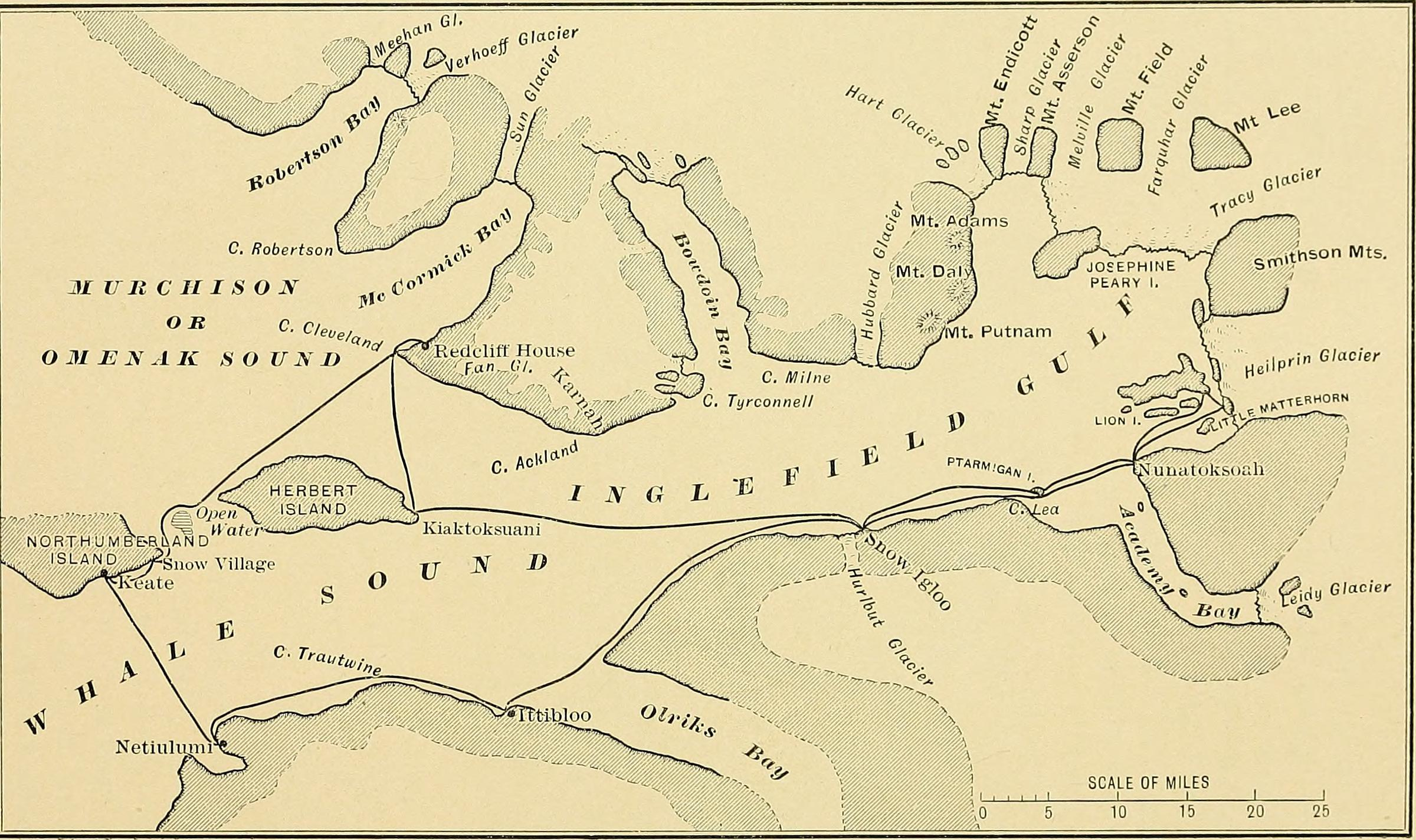
19th century map of the Inglefield Gulf.

== See also ==
- List of glaciers in Greenland
- Inglefield Fjord
