= Farquhar Glacier =

Glacier in Greenland

- Farquhar Gletscher
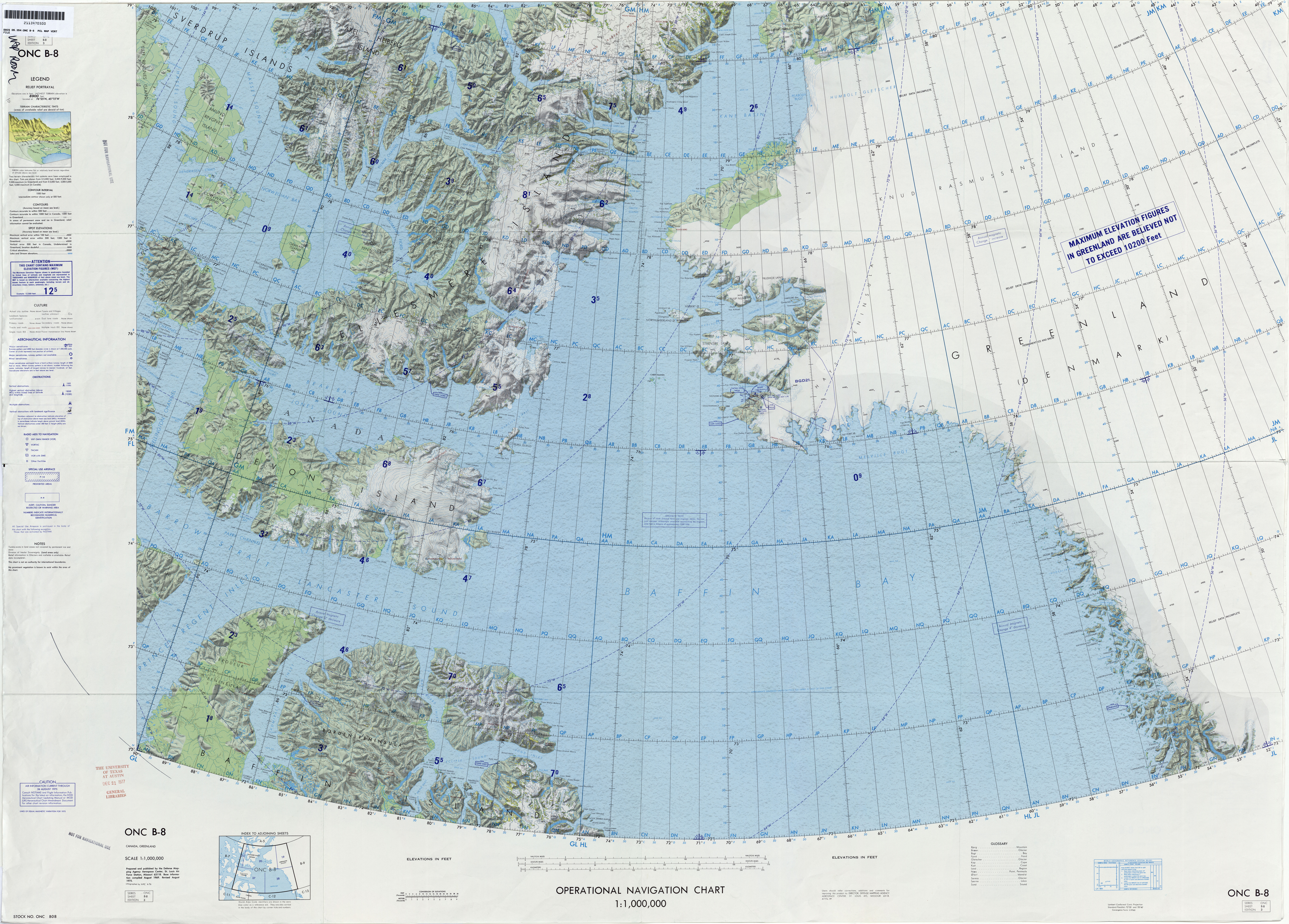
- Map of Northwestern Greenland

- Location within Greenland
- Type: Tidal outlet glacier
- Location: Greenland
- Coordinates: 77°41′N 66°16′W
- Width: 2.5 km (1.6 mi)
- Terminus: Inglefield Fjord; Baffin Bay
- Status: Retreating

Farquhar Glacier (Danish: Farquhar Gletscher), is a glacier in northwestern Greenland. Administratively it belongs to the Avannaata municipality.

This glacier was named by Robert Peary after Commodore Farquhar (1840 – 1907), Chief of the Bureau of Yards and Docks.

== Geography ==
The Farquhar Glacier discharges from the Greenland Ice Sheet into the northern side of the head of the Inglefield Fjord just northeast of Josephine Peary Island. Its terminus lies between two nunataks: Mount Lee in the east separates it from the Tracy Glacier to the southeast and Mount Field, a larger nunatak to the west, separates it from the Melville Glacier to the northwest.

Formerly the roughly NE/SW flowing Farquhar Glacier joined with the east/west flowing Tracy Glacier at their terminus. However, these two glaciers lost contact after the terminus disintegrated in 2002.

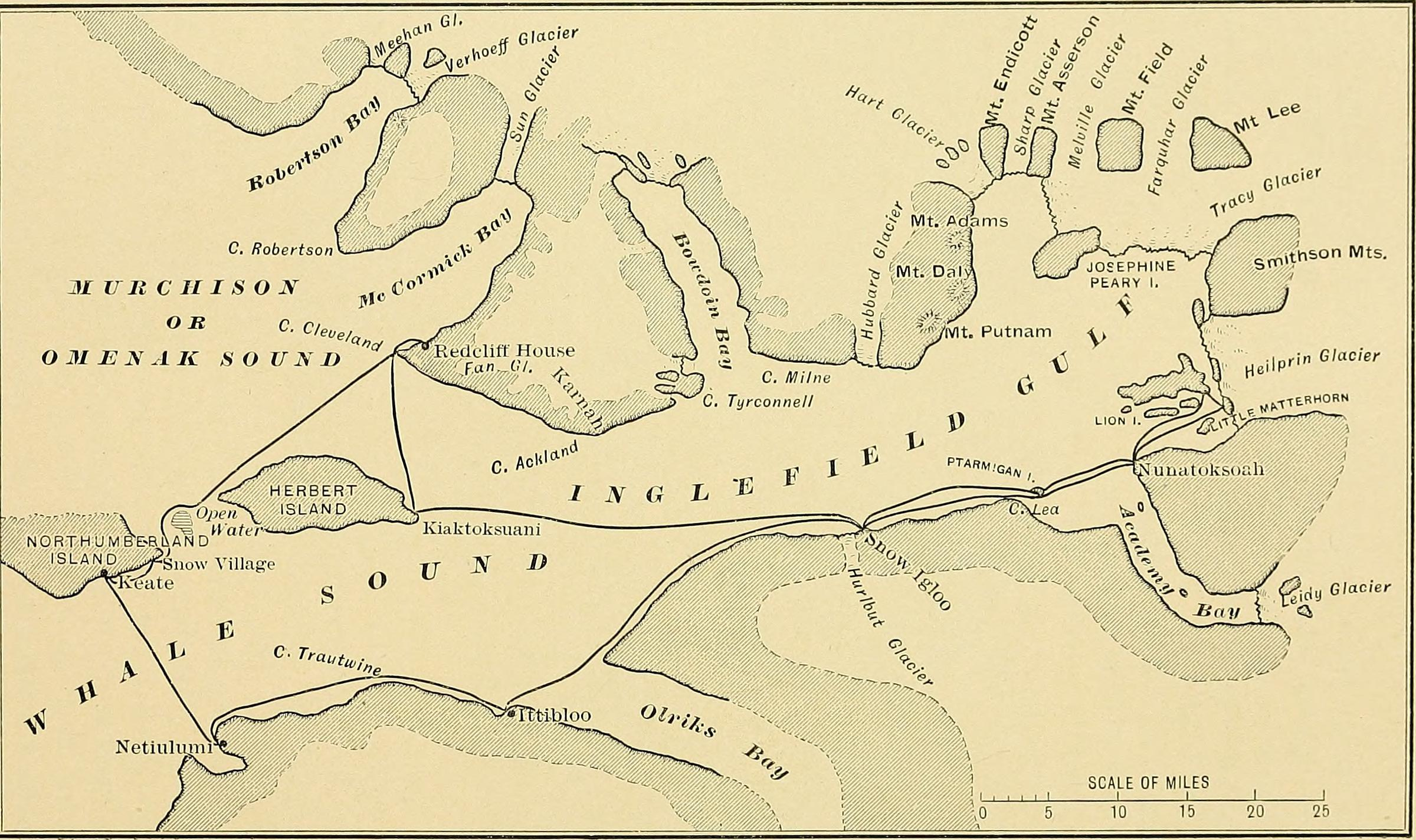
19th century map of the Inglefield Gulf.

== See also ==
- List of glaciers in Greenland
- Inglefield Fjord
- Glacier terminus
