= Academy Fjord =

Fjord in Avannaata, Greenland

- Academy Bay / Academy Bugt
- Location in Greenland
- Location: Arctic
- Coordinates: 77°18′N 66°30′W
- Ocean/sea sources: Inglefield Gulf; Baffin Bay
- Basin countries: Greenland
- Max. length: 25 km (16 mi)
- Max. width: 3.5 km (2.2 mi)

Academy Fjord or Academy Bay (Danish: Academy Bugt) is a fjord in northern Greenland. Administratively it belongs to the Avannaata municipality.

The fjord was named by Robert Peary after the Philadelphia Academy of Natural Sciences.

== Geography ==
The Academy Fjord opens to the northwest into the inner end of the Inglefield Gulf, close to its head and south of the Harvard Islands. The fjord is bordered on both sides by unglaciated plateaux reaching approximately 1,000 m (3,300 ft). The northeastern one, Nunatarsuaq, is a nunatak dotted with lakes. The southwestern side of the fjord is fringed by a continuous wall of almost vertical cliffs extending from a promontory at the mouth of the fjord beyond the head into the glacier area. The northeastern side of the fjord is also flanked by cliffs, but near the mouth it is cut by a few deep valleys through which the inner Nunatarsuaq plateau is accessible.

The head of the fjord is close to the head of Olrik Fjord, where the Leidy Glacier discharges from the Greenland Ice Sheet through the Academy Glacier into both fjords.

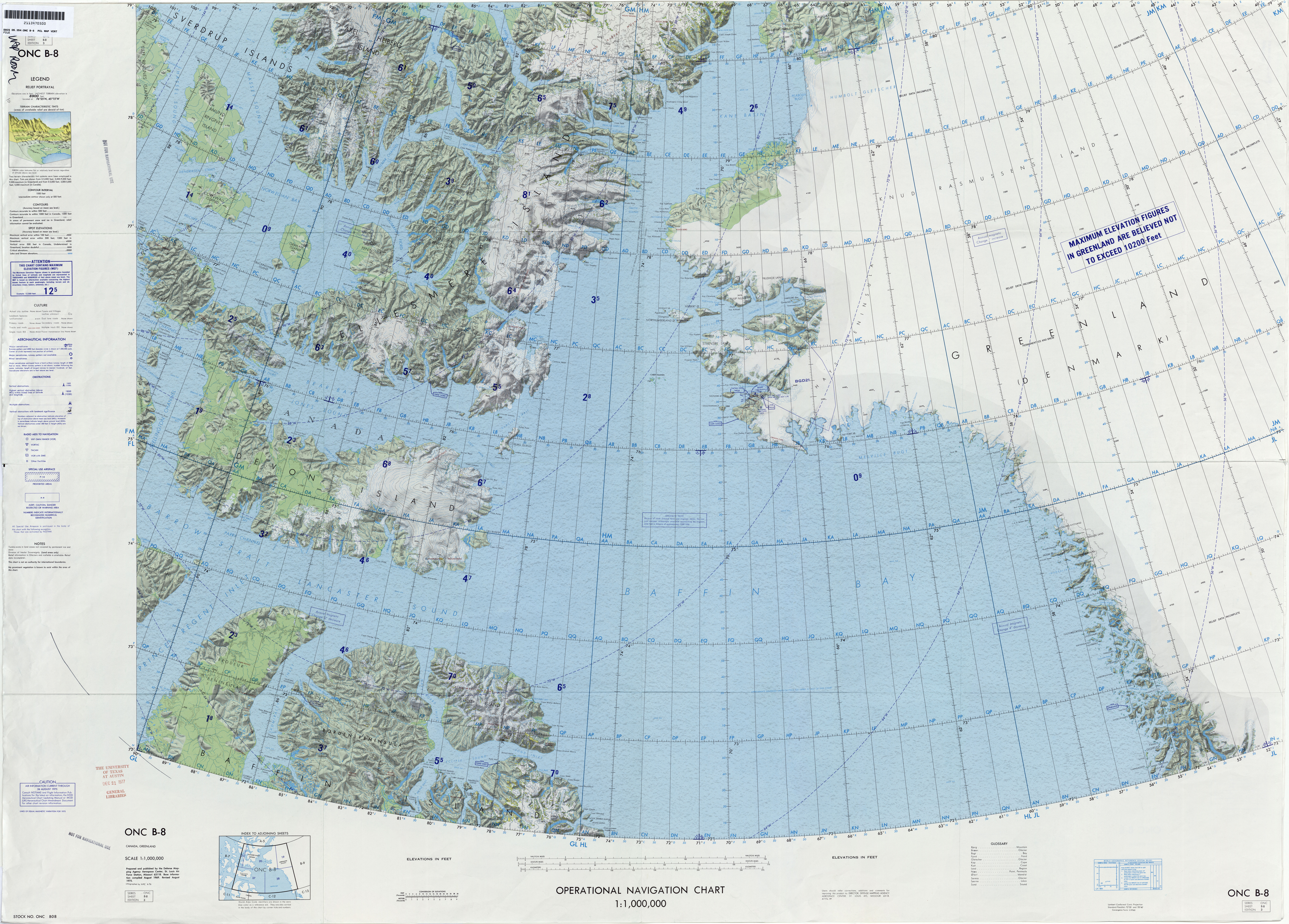
Map of Northwestern Greenland

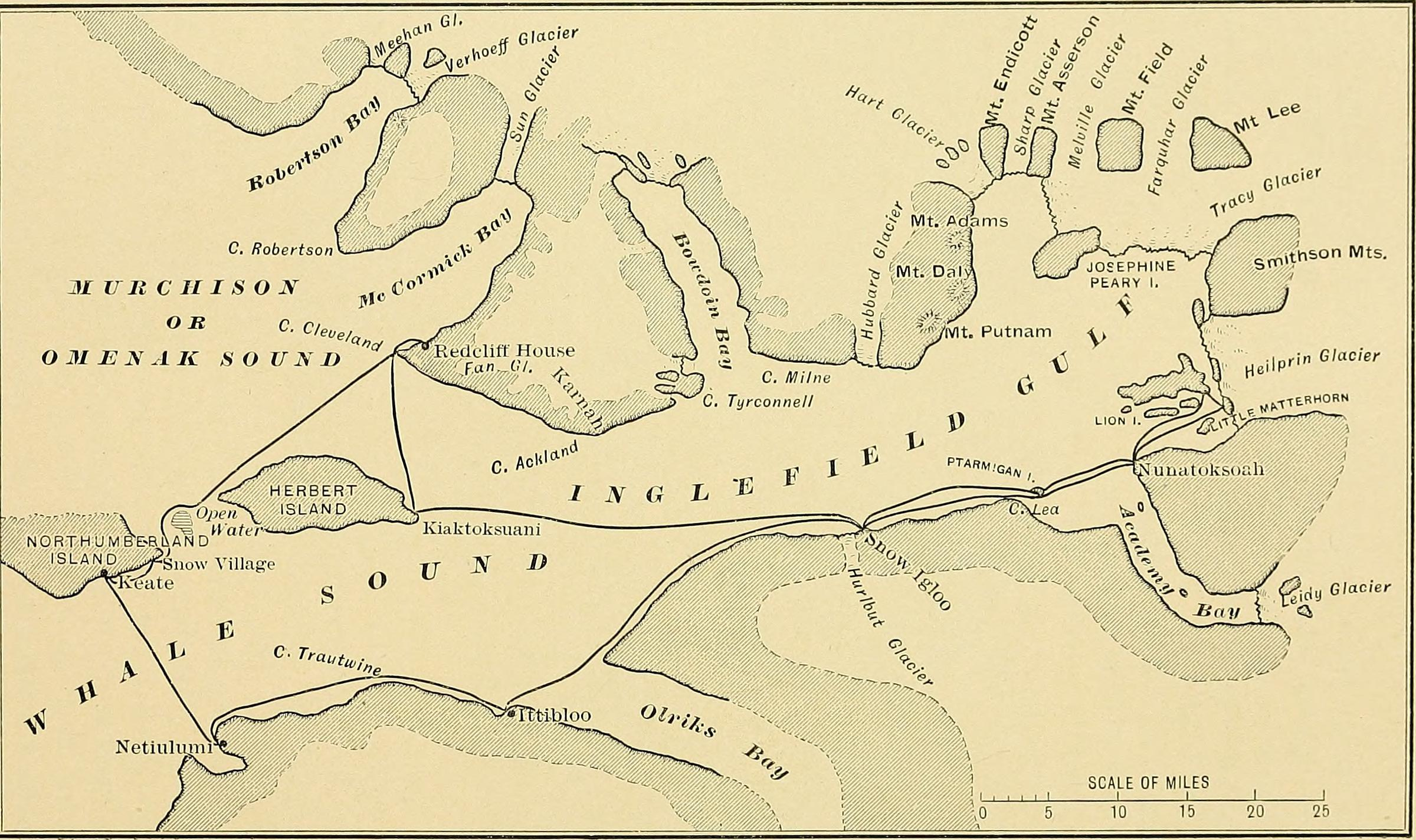
19th century map of the Inglefield Gulf.

== See also ==
- List of fjords of Greenland
