= Qaanaaq =

Qaanaaq New Thule
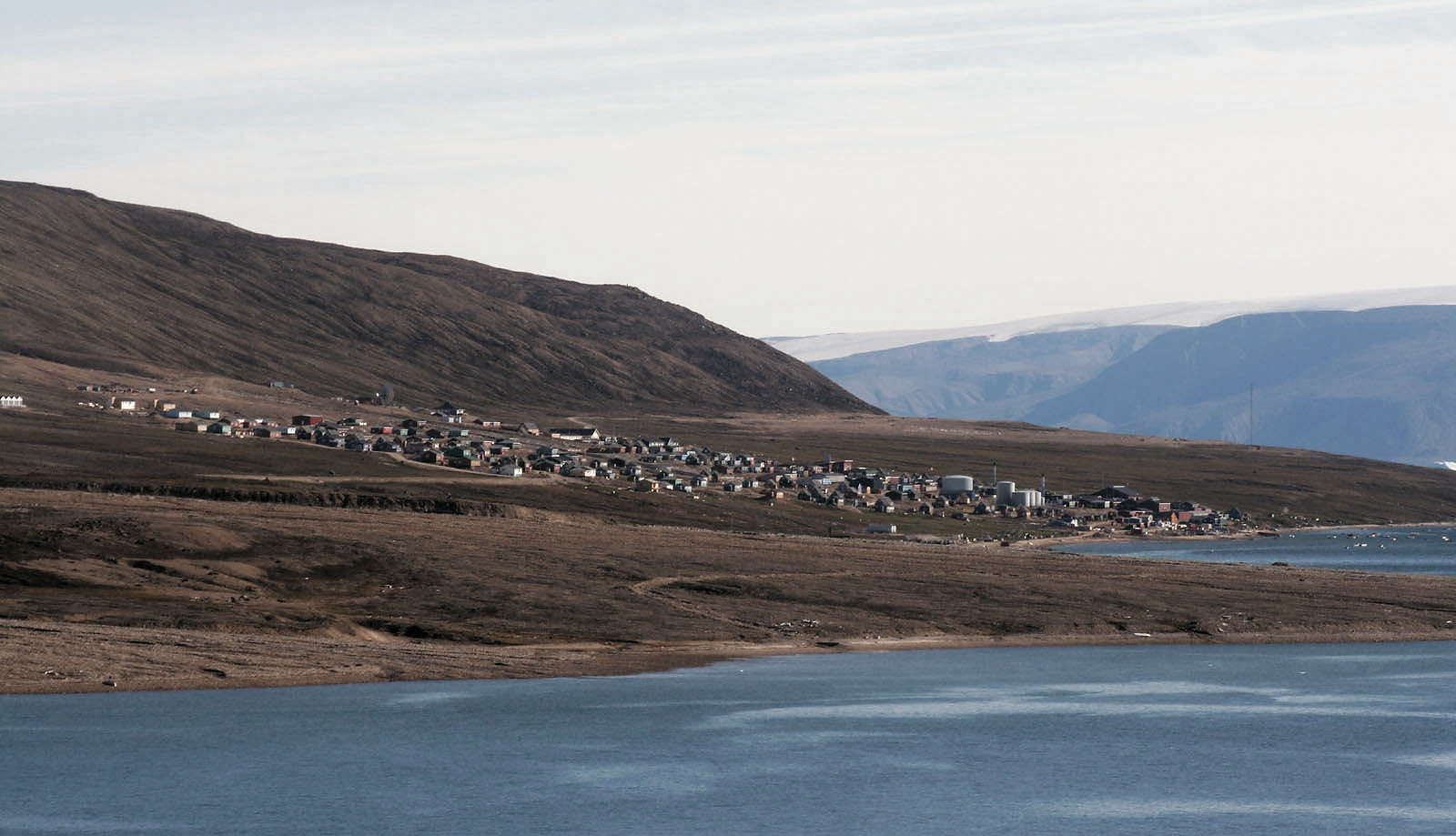
- Qaanaaq

- Location within Greenland Qaanaaq (Arctic)
- Coordinates: 77°28′00″N 69°13′50″W
- Sovereign state: Kingdom of Denmark
- Autonomous territory: Greenland
- Municipality: Avannaata
- First settled: 2000 BC

Population (2026)
  - Total: 586
- Time zone: UTC−02:00 (Western Greenland Time)
  - Summer (DST): UTC−01:00 (Western Greenland Summer Time)
- Postal code: 3971

Qaanaaq (Greenlandic pronunciation: [qaːnɑːq]), formerly known as New Thule, is the main town in the northern part of the Avannaata municipality in northwestern Greenland. The town has a population of 586 as of 2026. The population was forcibly relocated from its former, traditional home, which was expropriated for the construction of a United States Air Force base (Thule Air Base, now Pituffik Space Base) in 1953. The inhabitants of Qaanaaq speak the local Inuktun language and many also speak Kalaallisut and Danish.

Qaanaaq is one of the northernmost towns in the world. Within Greenland, it is the northernmost major town and the third northernmost public settlement, after nearby Qeqertat and Siorapaluk.

== Geography ==
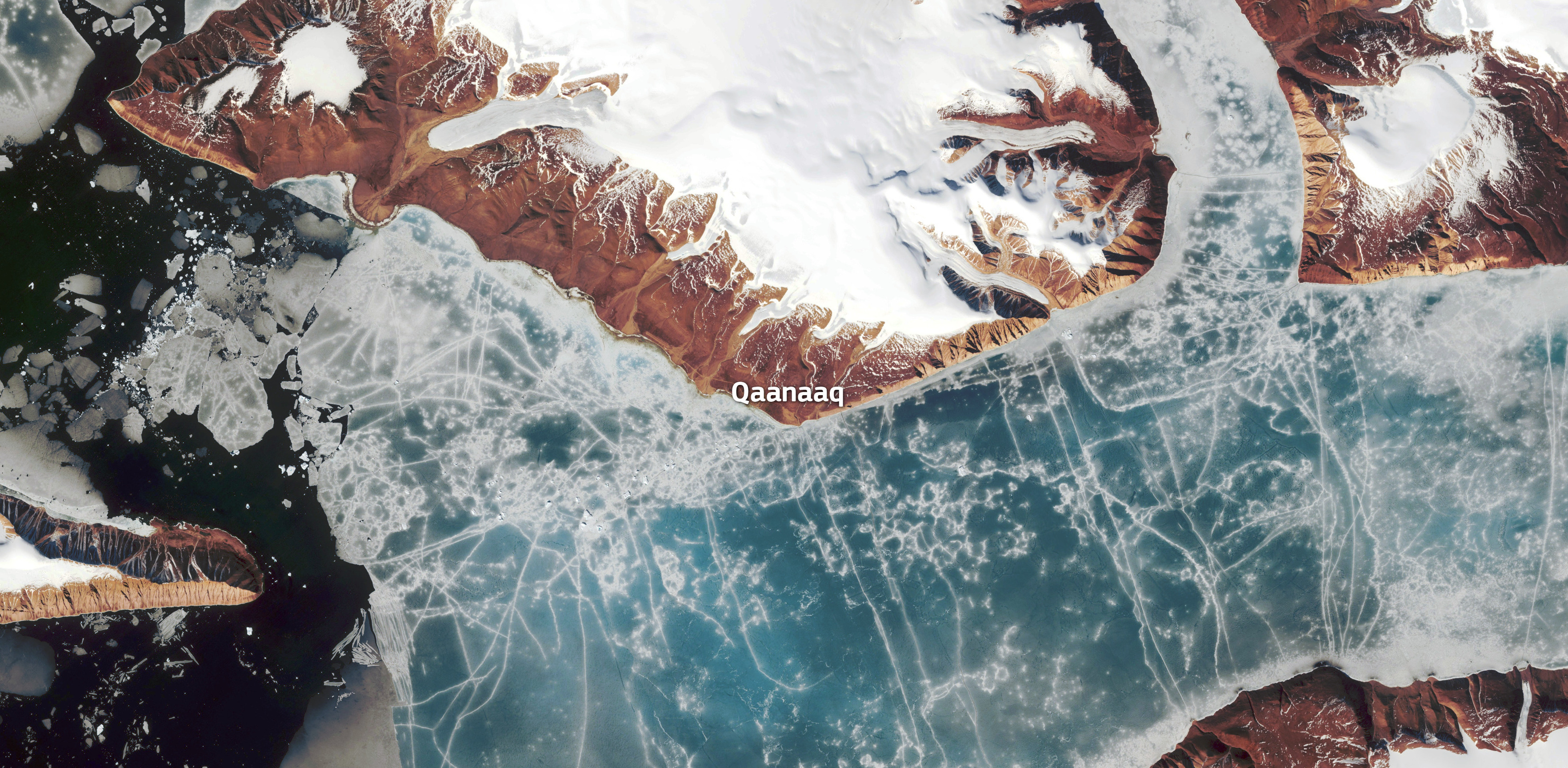
Qaanaaq and its surroundings

Qaanaaq is located in the northern entrance of the Inglefield Fjord. The village of Qeqertat is located in the Harvard Islands, near the head of the fjord.

== History ==
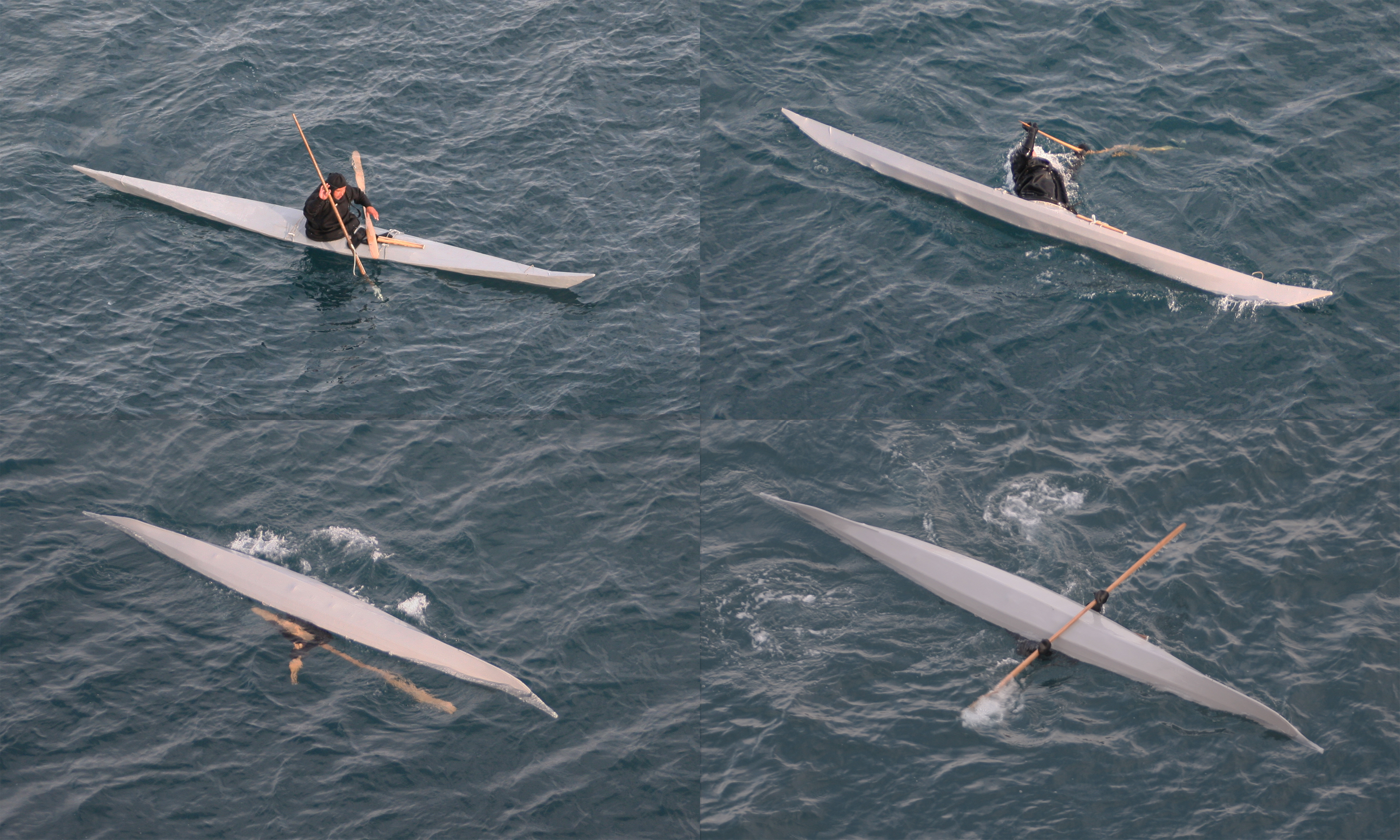
An Inuk man demonstrates kayaking techniques in the waters off Qaanaaq

The Qaanaaq area in northern Greenland was first settled around 2000 BCE by Paleo-Eskimos migrating from the Canadian Arctic. These people were displaced by the Thule culture, which followed the same migration route around 1100 CE. By 1600, climatic effects of the Little Ice Age caused the semi-nomadic Thule culture in Greenland to fragment into isolated groups, with inhabitants of the northwest diverging as the Inughuit. As they lost access to open water due to thickening sea ice, they lost the ability to build boats and had limited hunting opportunities.

In 1818, Sir John Ross's expedition made first contact with nomadic Inuktun (Polar Eskimos) in the area. In 1910 explorers Knud Rasmussen and Peter Freuchen established a missionary and trading post at North Star Bay. They called the site "Thule" after classical ultima Thule; the Inuit called it Umanaq or Uummannaq ("heart-shaped"), and the site is commonly called "Dundas" today. The United States abandoned its territorial claims in the area in 1917 in connection with the purchase of the Virgin Islands. Denmark assumed control of the village in 1937.

A cluster of huts known as Pituffik stood on the wide plain where Thule Air Base was built in 1951. The affected locals moved across the bay to the historical Thule settlement, which was connected to the base by an ice road. The joint Danish-American defense area, designated by treaty, also occupies considerable inland territory in addition to the air base itself. In 1953 the USAF planned to expand the base and construct an air defense site near Thule. In order to prevent contact with soldiers in a way deemed "unhealthy", the Danish government forcibly relocated "Old Thule" and about 130 inhabitants to Qaanaaq or "New Thule", 100 km (62 mi) to the north, within four days in winter. A modern new village was then built at Qaanaaq.

In a Danish Supreme Court judgment of 28 November 2003 the relocation was considered an expropriative intervention. During the proceedings it was recognized by the Danish government that it was a serious interference and an unlawful act against the local population. The Thule tribe was awarded damages of 500,000 kroner, and the individual members of the tribe who had been exposed to the transfer were granted compensation of 15,000 or 25,000 each. A Danish radio station continued to operate at Dundas, and the abandoned houses remained. The USAF only used that site for about a decade, and it has since returned to civilian use.

== Culture ==
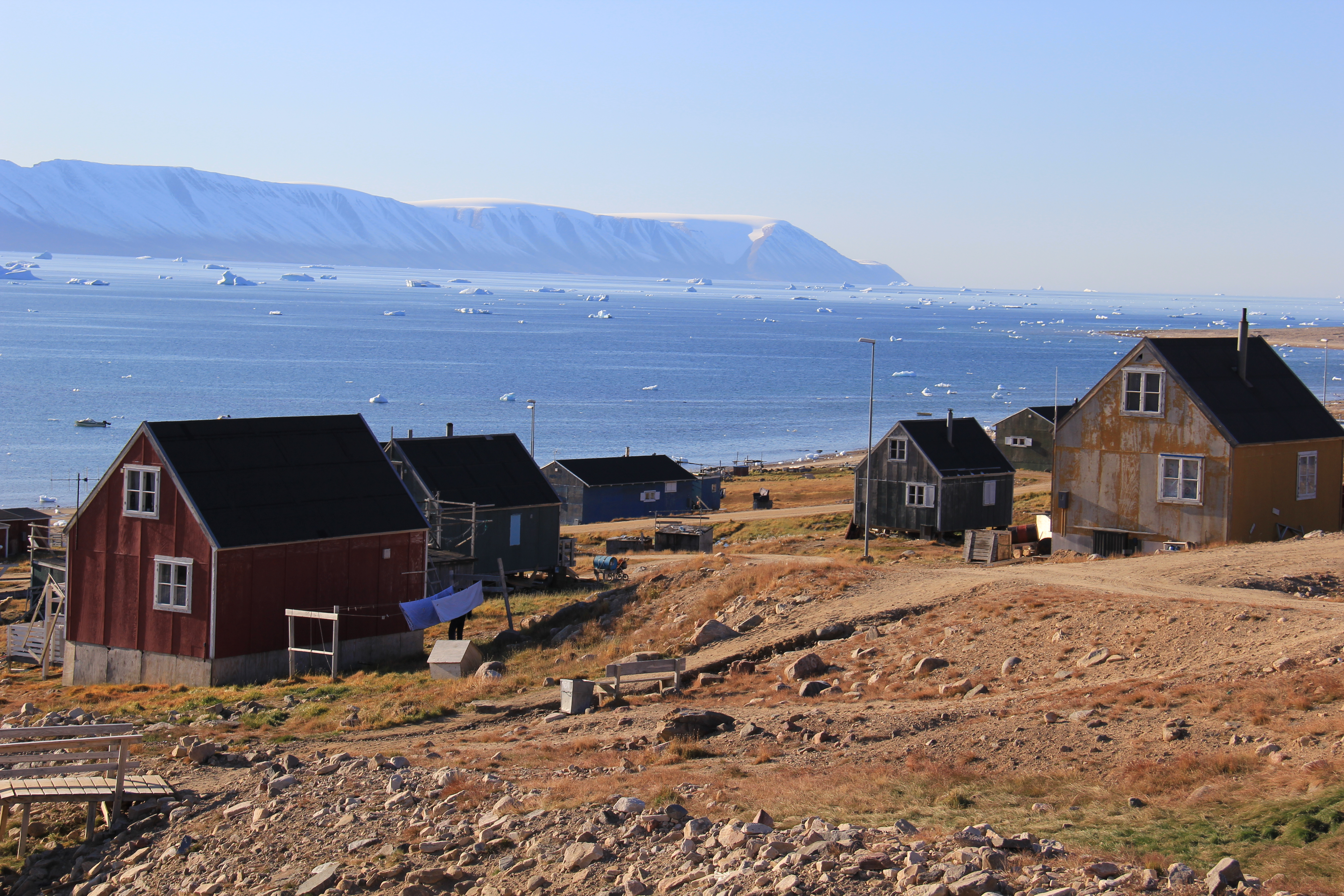
Qaanaaq houses

Ways of living so far north and in such severe climatic conditions are passed on from generation to generation, and this ability to adapt has contributed to the survival of this small settlement. When the sea becomes open sometime around August, large dinghies with powerful engines are used for both hunting trips and ordinary journeys. There is still sunlight twenty-four hours a day at this time—the midnight sun lasts from the middle of April to the end of August. Scarcity of resources requires they use every part of a harvested animal: the skins are used for clothing and covering the kayaks; the flesh and offal are eaten by humans and domestic animals; the narwhal and walrus tusks are carved into finely-worked figures, jewellery and hunting implements; and feathers can be used in handicrafts.

== Government ==
The town is part of the region of Avannaata, which is represented by a 17-member council and mayor.

== Population ==
With 646 inhabitants as of 2020, Qaanaaq is the largest settlement in the far north of the country. Its population has been relatively stable with only minor fluctuations since the mid-1990s.

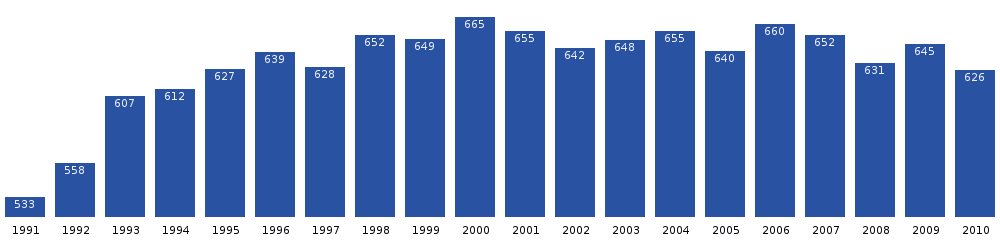
Qaanaaq population growth dynamics, 1991–2010. Source: Statistics Greenland

The city, with its relatively low population and tradition of hunting, currently has more huskies than human residents.

== Climate ==
Qaanaaq has a cold tundra climate (Köppen climate classification ET), and hence it has long, cold winters. July and August are the warmest months, and peak high temperatures rarely exceeding 20 °C (68 °F) occur in June and July.

Climate data for Qaanaaq (1995–2020)
Month	Jan	Feb	Mar	Apr	May	Jun	Jul	Aug	Sep	Oct	Nov	Dec	Year
Record high °C (°F)	7.1 (44.8)	4.1 (39.4)	9.8 (49.6)	6.0 (42.8)	14.0 (57.2)	20.9 (69.6)	20.3 (68.5)	17.6 (63.7)	13.3 (55.9)	12.5 (54.5)	9.0 (48.2)	8.3 (46.9)	20.9 (69.6)
Mean daily maximum °C (°F)	−18.1 (−0.6)	−19.1 (−2.4)	−16.9 (1.6)	−8.3 (17.1)	0.5 (32.9)	6.4 (43.5)	10.0 (50.0)	8.4 (47.1)	2.4 (36.3)	−4.2 (24.4)	−9.8 (14.4)	−14.6 (5.7)	−5.3 (22.5)
Daily mean °C (°F)	−21.7 (−7.1)	−23.0 (−9.4)	−21.7 (−7.1)	−13.8 (7.2)	−3.7 (25.3)	3.0 (37.4)	6.6 (43.9)	5.5 (41.9)	−0.4 (31.3)	−6.7 (19.9)	−12.6 (9.3)	−17.8 (0.0)	−8.9 (16.1)
Mean daily minimum °C (°F)	−25.2 (−13.4)	−26.8 (−16.2)	−26.3 (−15.3)	−19.3 (−2.7)	−8.5 (16.7)	−0.1 (31.8)	3.4 (38.1)	2.9 (37.2)	−2.8 (27.0)	−9.1 (15.6)	−15.5 (4.1)	−21.1 (−6.0)	−12.4 (9.7)
Record low °C (°F)	−40.5 (−40.9)	−40.0 (−40.0)	−41.2 (−42.2)	−33.0 (−27.4)	−23.1 (−9.6)	−6.4 (20.5)	−3.0 (26.6)	−6.7 (19.9)	−15.4 (4.3)	−29.8 (−21.6)	−32.5 (−26.5)	−36.9 (−34.4)	−41.2 (−42.2)
Average precipitation mm (inches)	6 (0.2)	6 (0.2)	4 (0.2)	6 (0.2)	7 (0.3)	7 (0.3)	16 (0.6)	24 (0.9)	18 (0.7)	12 (0.5)	10 (0.4)	8 (0.3)	124 (4.9)
Average precipitation days (≥ 1.0 mm)	2	2	1	2	2	2	4	4	4	3	3	2	31
Average relative humidity (%)	64.1	66.5	64.9	64.8	70.1	76.5	76.1	73.6	63.2	62.6	61.7	64.3	67.4
Mean monthly sunshine hours	0	8	150	251	316	273	271	175	155	49	0	0	1,648
Source 1: NOAA (precipitation, precipitation days and sunshine 1961–1990)
Source 2: Danish Meteorological Institute (temperatures and humidity 1995–2020)

== Infrastructure ==
Qaanaaq Airport is five kilometres (three miles) along the coast from the town. Air Greenland operates fixed-wing aircraft services to and from Upernavik Airport, with further connections to Ilulissat Airport and Qaarsut Airport. Settlement flights operate to Siorapaluk, sporadically to Moriusaq, and to Savissivik via Pituffik Space Base.

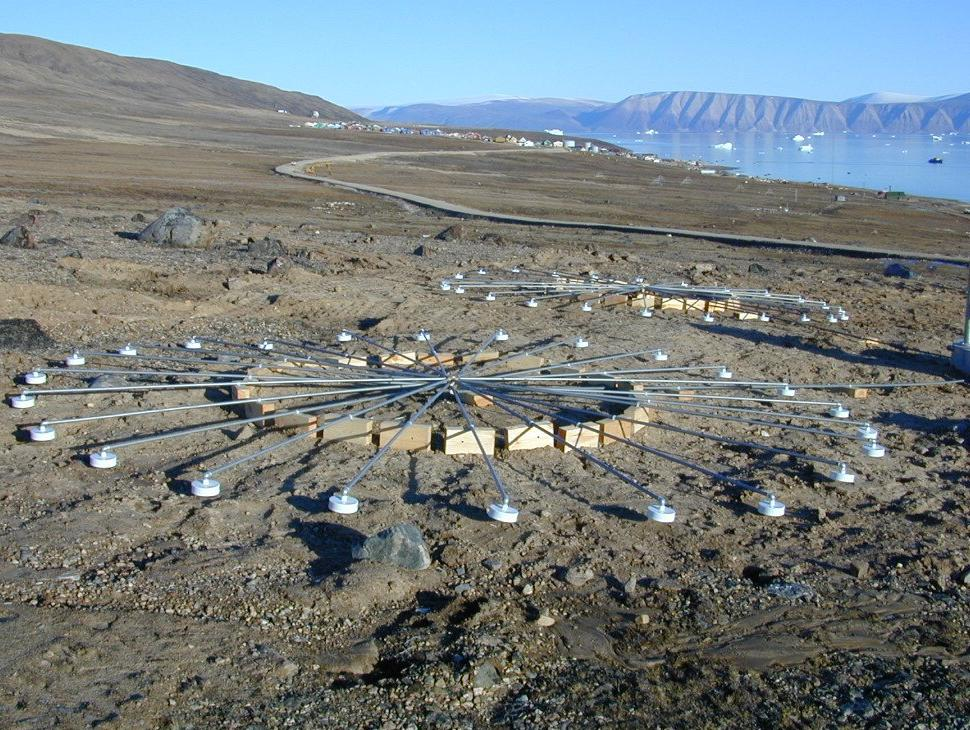
The CTBTO micro-barometer array, located about 1.5 km (1 mi) outside of the town

There are a few unpaved dirt roads in Qaanaaq. Only the road to the airport leaves the town. Pickup trucks and SUVs are found, but skis, dogsleds and walking are better alternatives for getting around.

There is a small hospital (built in the 1950s and rebuilt in 1996) with basic health care offered. More advanced care requires transfer to other medical centers in Greenland by air. Dental care is offered in the form of a dentist who visits the town twice a year. Qaanaaq Hospital falls under the Avannaa health region.

A small local fire brigade is assisted by firefighters from the Pituffik Space Base.

Qaanaaq is home to a remote CTBTO infrasound listening station called IS-18, which uses an array of barometric sensors to detect possible nuclear tests around the world. The station is maintained by the Danish Meteorological Institute, and as of 2016 the current operator is Svend Erik Ascanius.

== Education ==
The local school, Avanersuup Atuarfia, has around 120 pupils in forms 1 to 10. There is also a boarding school which holds about 20 students from surrounding settlements. The town kindergarten has a capacity of 34 children while the day nursery can hold up to 12.
