= Hurlbut Glacier =

Glacier in northwestern Greenland

- Hurlbut Gletscher; Hurlbut Bræ
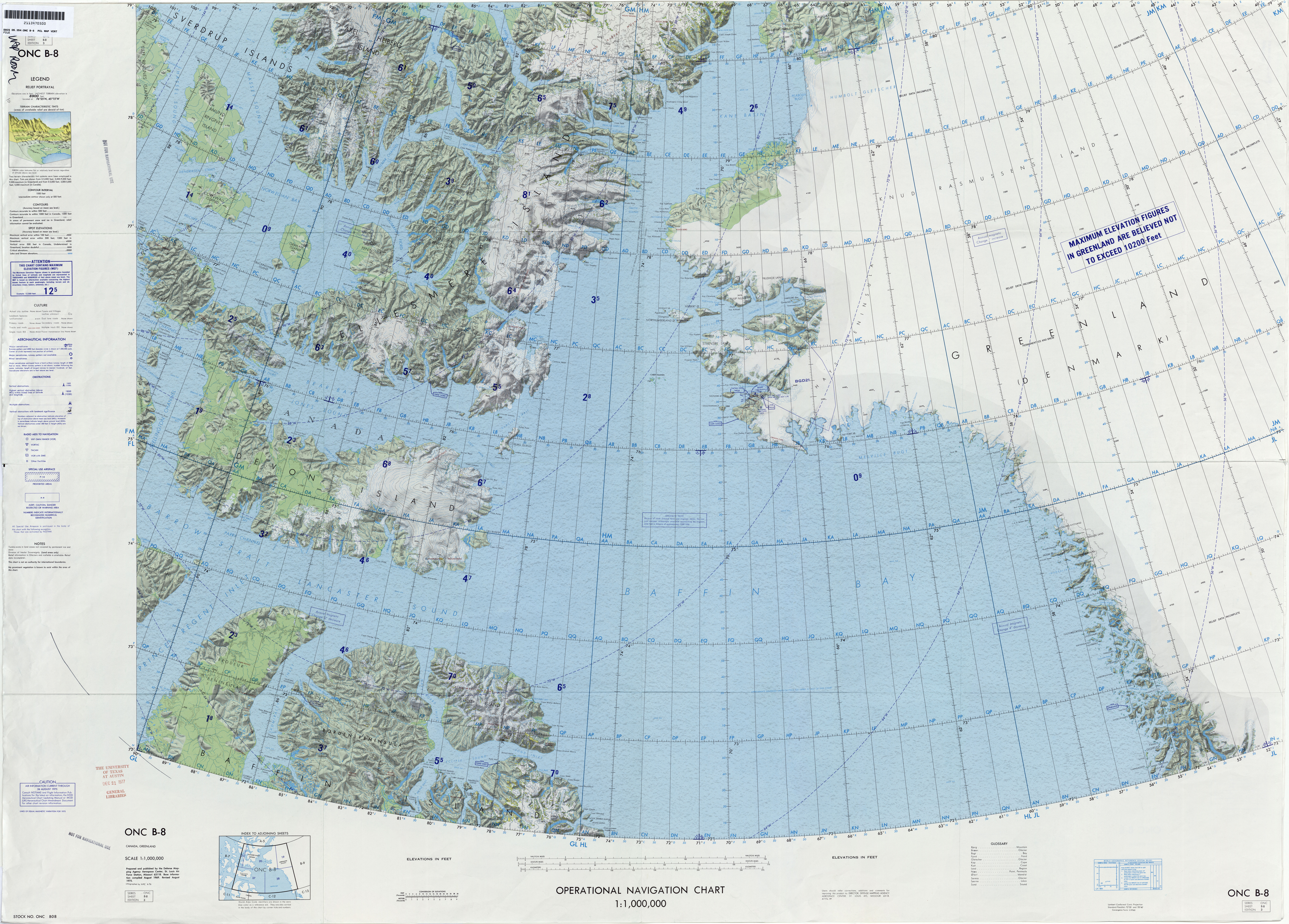
- Map of Northwestern Greenland

- Location within Greenland
- Type: Ice cap
- Location: Greenland
- Coordinates: 77°22′N 66°58′W
- Area: 188 km^{2} (73 sq mi)
- Thickness: 400 m (1,300 ft)
- Terminus: Inglefield Fjord; Baffin Bay
- Status: Retreating

Hurlbut Glacier (Danish: Hurlbut Gletscher) is a glacier in northwestern Greenland. Administratively it belongs to the Avannaata municipality.

This glacier was named by Robert Peary after George Hurlbut (1830 – 1908), secretary and librarian of the American Geographical Society.

== Geography ==
The Hurlbut Glacier is an ice cap located between Olrik Fjord and Inglefield Fjord with an outlet that flows roughly from south to north. The outlet has its terminus in the southern shore of the mid Inglefield Fjord. In recent times it has retreated by less than 5 m (16 ft) per year.

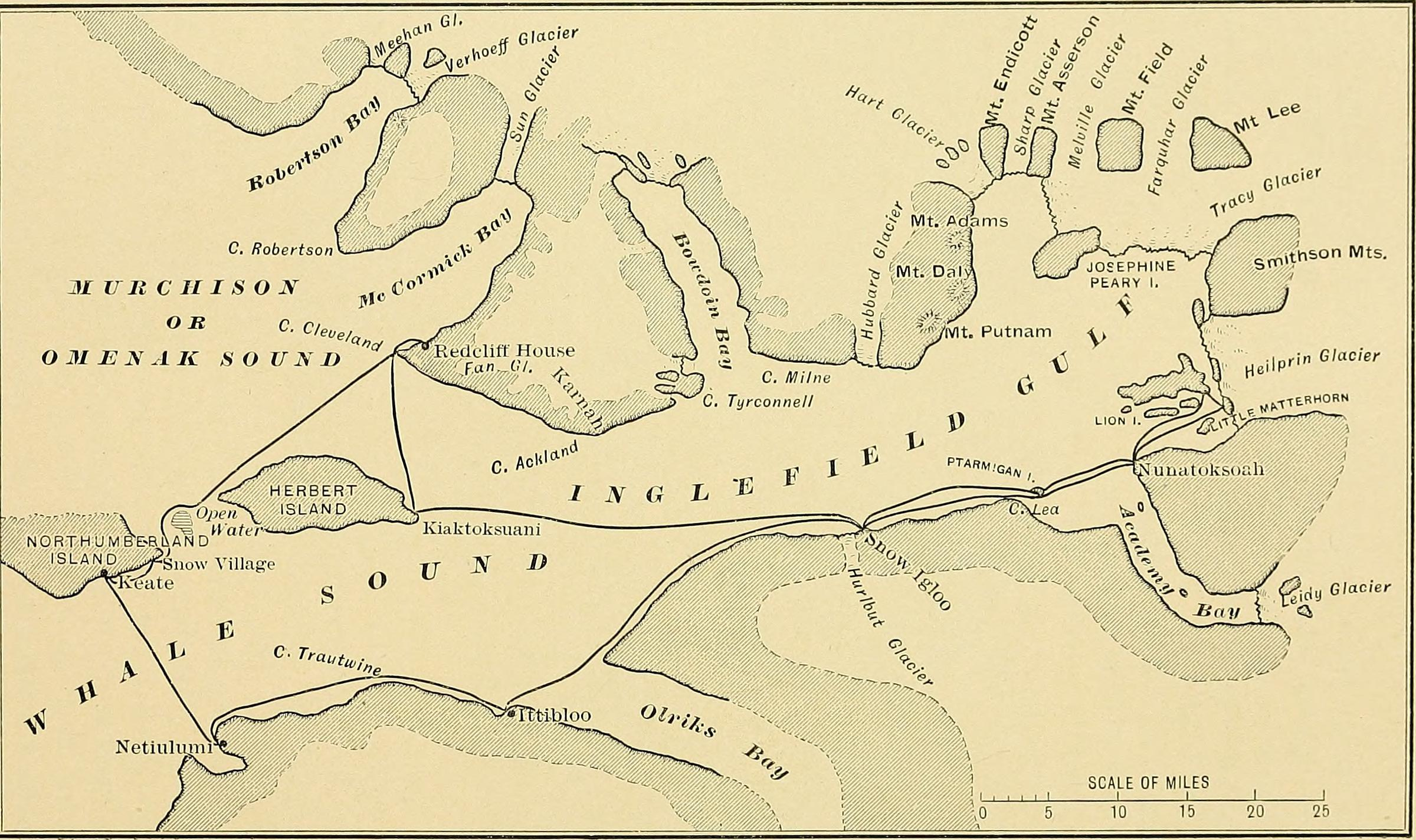
19th century map of the Inglefield Gulf.

== See also ==
- List of glaciers in Greenland
- Inglefield Fjord
