= Hart Glacier (Greenland) =

Glacier in northwestern Greenland

- Hart Gletscher
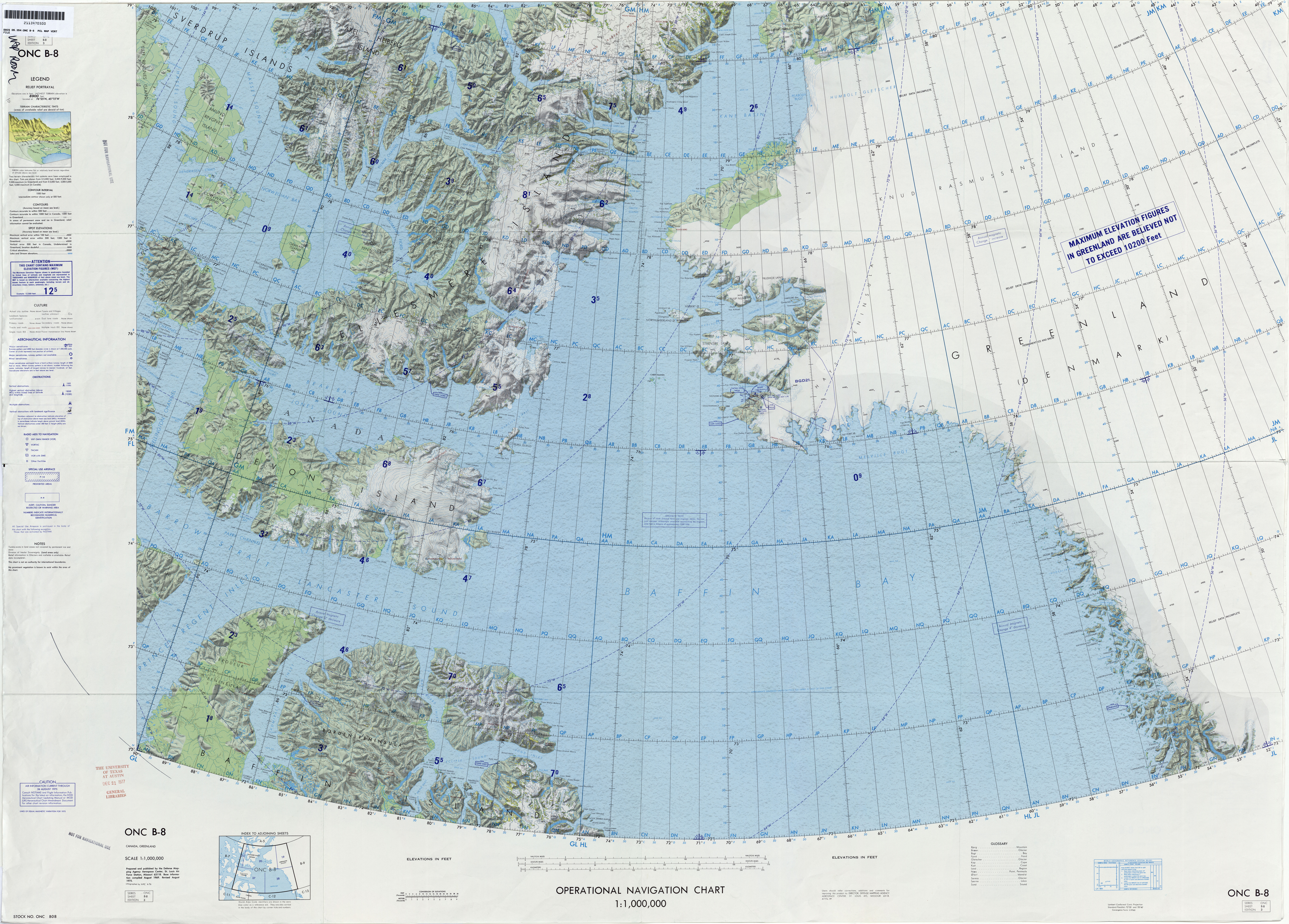
- Map of Northwestern Greenland

- Location within Greenland
- Type: Tidal outlet glacier
- Location: Greenland
- Coordinates: 77°41′N 67°9′W
- Width: 2 km (1.2 mi)
- Terminus: Inglefield Fjord; Baffin Bay
- Status: Retreating

Hart Glacier (Danish: Hart Gletscher) is a glacier in northwestern Greenland. Administratively it belongs to the Avannaata municipality.

This glacier was named by Robert Peary after Gavin W. Hart (1848 – 1909), permanent Councillor and member of the Finance committee of the Philadelphia Academy of Natural Sciences, who helped Peary raise funds for his expeditions.

== Geography ==
The Hart Glacier discharges from the Greenland Ice Sheet and has its terminus in the northern side of the head of the Inglefield Fjord, northwest of Josephine Peary Island. Its last stretch lies between Prudhoe Land in the west and Mount Endicott, a nunatak that separates it from the Sharp Glacier to the east.

The Hart Glacier flows roughly from NW to SE. In the same manner as its neighboring glaciers, it has retreated by approximately 1 km (0.62 mi) in the period between the 1980s and 2014.

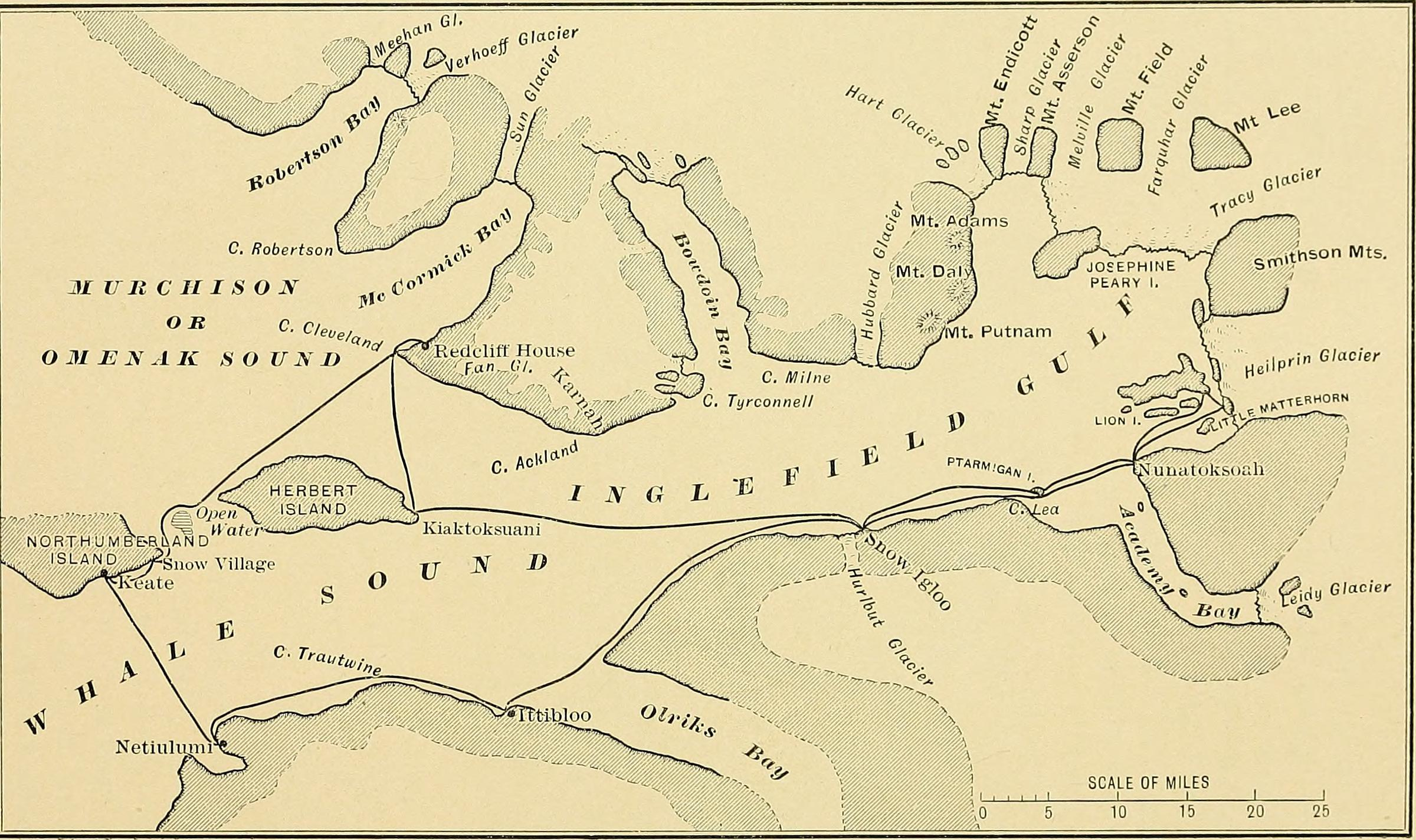
19th century map of the Inglefield Gulf.

== See also ==
- List of glaciers in Greenland
- Inglefield Fjord
