= Inglefield Gulf =

Fjord in northwestern Greenland

- Inglefield Bredning; Inglefield Fjord
- Kangerlussuaq (Greenlandic)
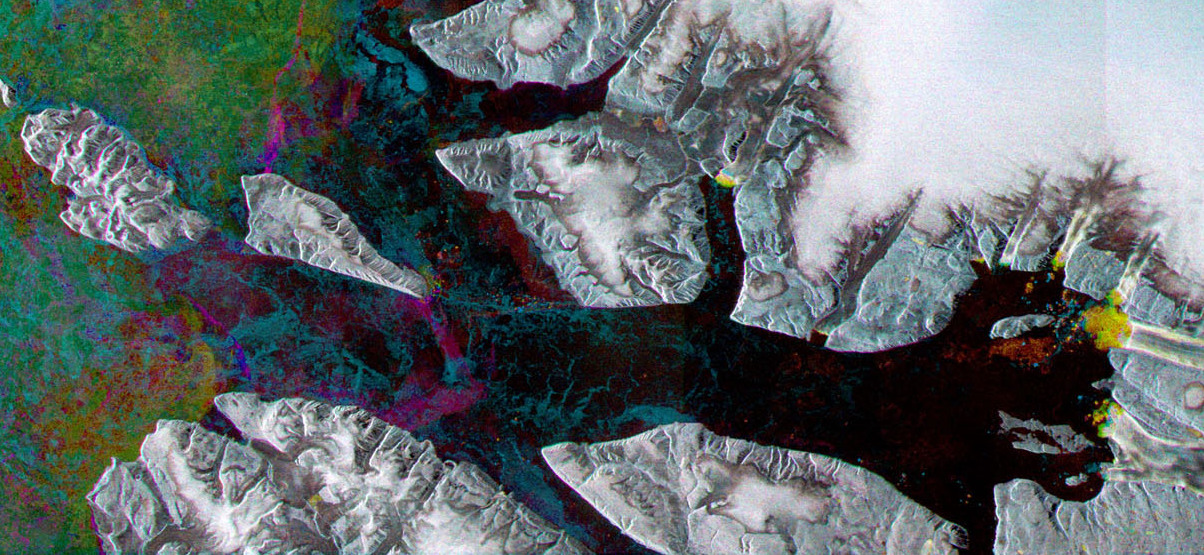
- Envisat radar image showing Inglefield Fjord

- Location in Greenland
- Location: Arctic
- Coordinates: 77°27′N 67°48′W
- Ocean/sea sources: Baffin Bay
- Basin countries: Greenland
- Max. length: 70 km (43 mi)
- Max. width: 20 km (12 mi)
- Settlements: Qeqertat

Inglefield Gulf or Inglefield Fjord (Danish: Inglefield Bredning; Greenlandic: Kangerlussuaq) is a fjord in northwestern Greenland. To the west, the fjord opens into the Baffin Bay. Administratively it belongs to the Avannaata municipality.

Inglefield Gulf was named after English explorer Edward Augustus Inglefield.

== Settlements ==
Qaanaaq is located in the northern entrance of the fjord. The village of Qeqertat is located in the Harvard Islands, in the inner area of the fjord. Both are the northernmost communities in the world.

== Geography ==
Together with Wolstenholme Fjord, Inglefield Gulf is one of the two main indentations in the stretch of coast between Cape York and Cape Alexander. On the northern shore of the fjord there is a branch, the Bowdoin Fjord, and on the southern there are two, the Academy Bay in the inner fjord with the Leidy Glacier at its head and the narrow Olrik Fjord running roughly from east to west.

The Heilprin Glacier, flowing from the Greenland Ice Sheet in the east, is the largest glacier that has its terminus in the fjord. The Tracy Glacier has its terminus further north near Josephine Peary Island in a bay at the northern side of the head of the fjord where the smaller Hart Glacier, Sharp Glacier, Melville Glacier, and Farquhar Glacier have their terminus. As they discharge into the fjord all these glaciers are separated by nunataks, the largest of which is the Smithson Range. In the central area of the fjord the Hubbard Glacier discharges on the northern shore and the Hurlbut Glacier on the southern shore.

The islands of Qeqertarsuaq (Herbert Island) and Kiatak (Northumberland Island) lie off the fjord's mouth. They are aligned from east to west, dividing the outer gulf into two sounds, the Murchison Sound to the north beyond Cape Ackland, and the Hvalsund to the south, west of Kangeq.

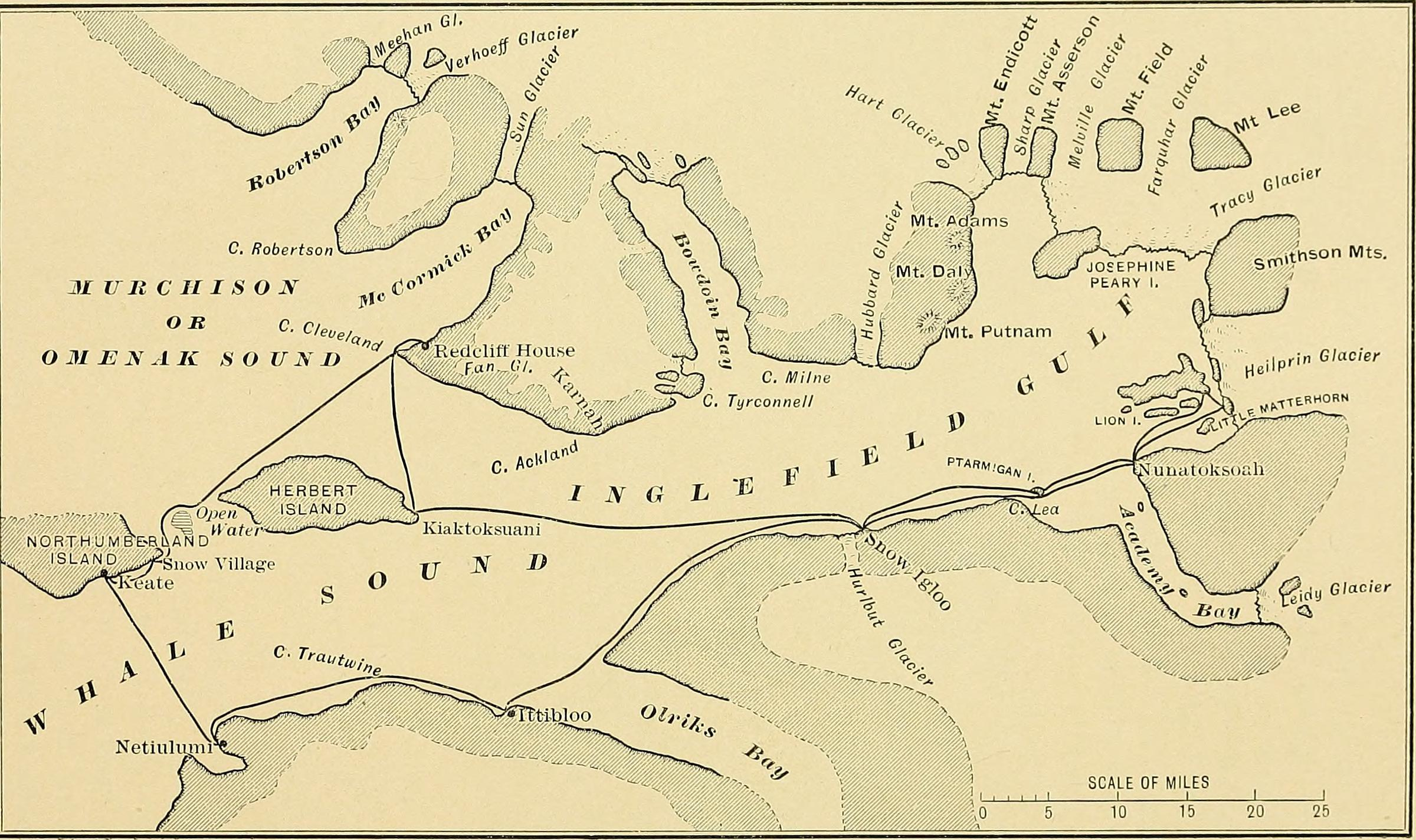
19th century map of the Inglefield Gulf.

== See also ==
- List of fjords of Greenland
