= Olrik Fjord =

Fjord in northern Greenland

- Kangerluarsorujuk (Greenlandic)
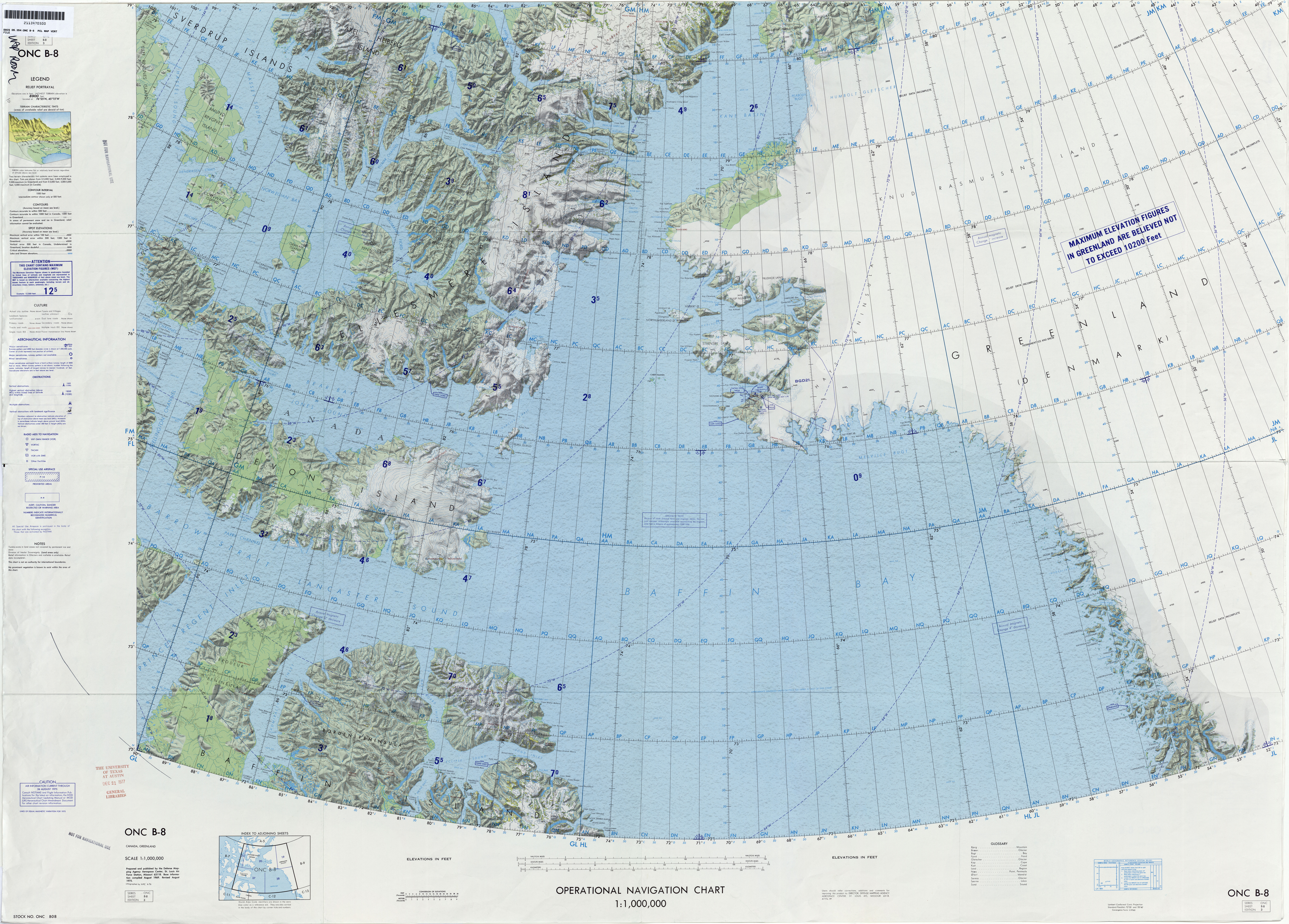
- Map of Northwestern Greenland

- Location in Greenland
- Location: Arctic
- Coordinates: 77°12′N 67°34′W
- Ocean/sea sources: Hvalsund; Baffin Bay
- Basin countries: Greenland
- Max. length: 80 km (50 mi)
- Max. width: 5 km (3.1 mi)
- Settlements: Illoqarfissuaq

Olrik Fjord (Danish: Olriks Fjord; Greenlandic: Kangerluarsorujuk) is a fjord in the Avannaata municipality, Northwestern Greenland. To the east the fjord opens into the Hvalsund, at the end of the Inglefield Gulf of the Baffin Bay.

== History ==
This fjord was named after Christian Søren Marcus Olrik, Royal Inspector of North Greenland during the American Arctic Expedition, lead by Isaac Israel Hayes from 1860 to 1861.

In 1965, 9 semi-domestic reindeer were released near Olrik Fjord from southwest Greenland to replace the native reindeer population which had gone extinct around 1940. During an aerial survey in 2001, a minimum of 38 reindeer were counted in the area around Olrik Fjord.

== Geography ==
Olrik Fjord runs in a roughly east–west direction with its mouth south of Kangeq, near the abandoned settlement of Narsaq, in the southern shore of the mouth of the Inglefield Gulf, where the latter becomes the Hvalsund. It is a long and narrow fjord, having a shape uncommon in NW Greenland. In the area near its mouth the fjord's southern shore is fringed by up to 680 m (2,230 ft) high cliffs displaying multicolored strata.

The Marie Glacier, an offshoot of the Leidy Glacier, discharges at the head of the Olrik Fjord, not far from the head of the Academy Fjord. The Savage Glacier discharges at the mouth of the fjord and Sermiarsupaluk discharges near the head of the fjord.

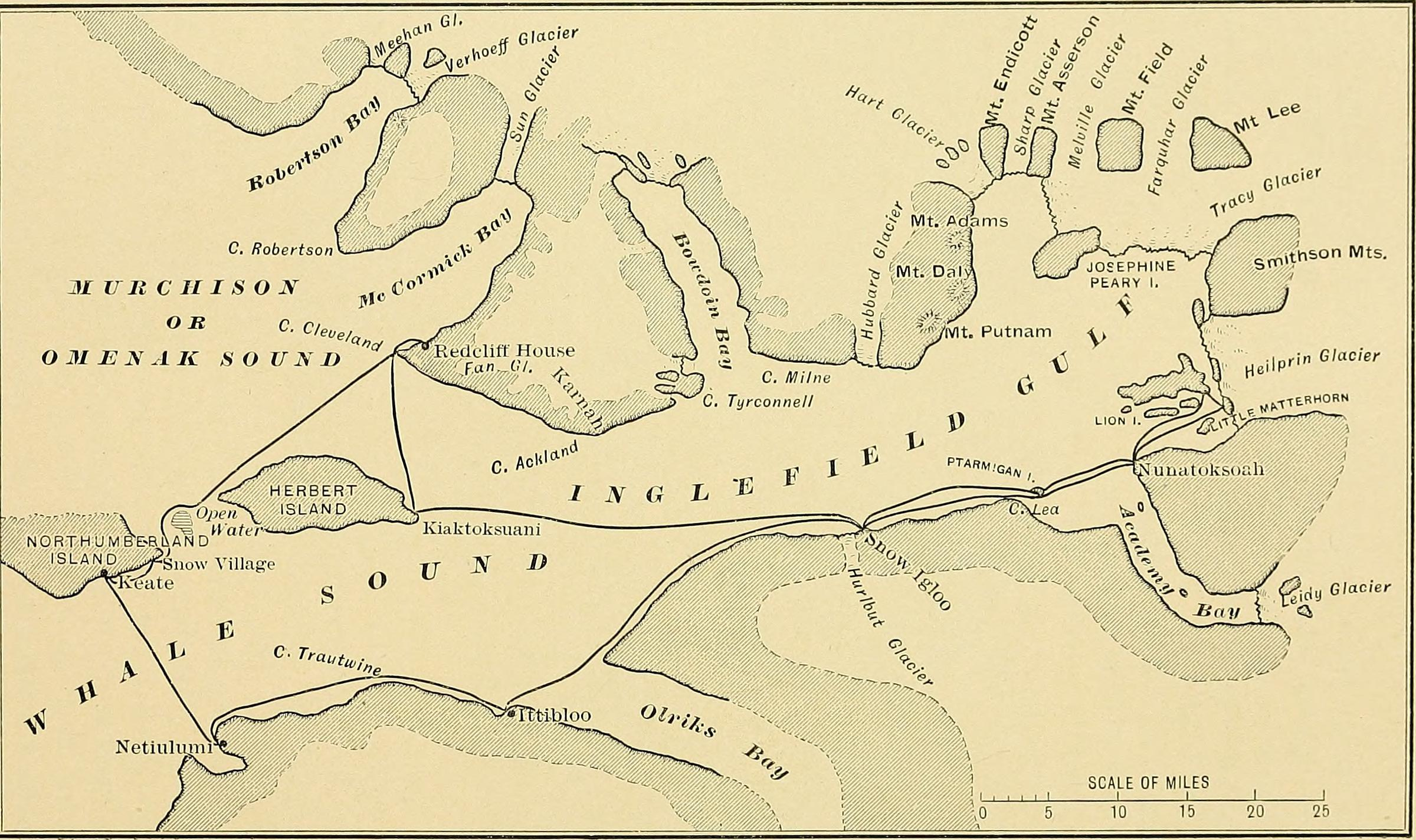
19th century map of the Inglefield Gulf.

== Bibliography ==
- Daniel D. Roby, Henning Thing and Karen L. Brink, History, Status, and Taxonomic Identity of Caribou (Rangifer tarandus) in Northwest Greenland. Arctic Vol. 37, No. 1 (Mar., 1984), pp. 23-30
- Geology of Greenland Survey Bulletin 174, 1997, p. 120 - GEUS

== See also ==
- List of fjords of Greenland
- Arctic desert
