= List of the most isolated major summits of the United States =

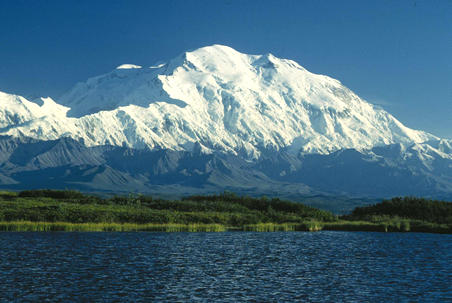
Denali in Alaska is the highest mountain peak of the United States and North America. Denali is the third most topographically prominent and third most topographically isolated summit on Earth after Mount Everest and Aconcagua.

The following sortable table comprises the 209 most topographically isolated mountain peaks of the United States of America (including its territories) with at least 500 meters (1640 feet) of topographic prominence. (Note: 200 summits in the table below are located within the 50 states and District of Columbia, while 9 summits are located in the U.S. territories — for a total of 209.)

The summit of a mountain or hill may be measured in three principal ways:

1. The topographic elevation of a summit measures the height of the summit above a geodetic sea level.
2. The topographic prominence of a summit is a measure of how high the summit rises above its surroundings.
3. The topographic isolation (or radius of dominance) of a summit measures how far the summit lies from its nearest point of equal elevation.

In the United States, only Denali exceeds 4000 kilometers (2485 miles) of topographic isolation. 3 summits exceed 2000 kilometers (1243 miles), 8 exceed 1000 kilometers (621.4 miles), 13 exceed 500 kilometers (310.7 miles), 47 exceed 200 kilometers (124.3 miles), 113 exceed 100 kilometers (62.14 miles), and 214 major summits exceed 50 kilometers (31.07 miles) of topographic isolation.

== Most isolated major summits ==
The list below contains the 200 most isolated major summits in the 50 states and District of Columbia, plus an additional 9 major isolated summits in the U.S. territories, for a total of 209 summits.

Of these 209 most isolated major summits of the United States, 63 are located in Alaska, 19 in Montana, 16 in California, 14 in Utah, 13 in Nevada, 12 in Colorado, 12 in Arizona, 10 in Wyoming, 7 in Washington, 7 in Oregon, 6 in New Mexico, 5 in the Northern Mariana Islands, 4 in Hawaiʻi, 3 in Idaho, 3 in Texas, 2 in North Carolina, 2 in Maine, 2 in New York, 2 in American Samoa, 2 in Puerto Rico, and one each in New Hampshire, Arkansas, South Dakota, Tennessee, Vermont, Virginia, and West Virginia. Two of these summits lie on the international border between Alaska and British Columbia and one lies on the state border between Tennessee and North Carolina.

The 209 most topographically isolated summits of the United States with at least 500 meters of topographic prominence
Rank	Mountain Peak	State or territory	Mountain Range	Elevation	Prominence	Isolation	Location
1	Denali (Note: The summit of Denali is the highest point of the Alaska Range, the State of Alaska, the United States of America, and greater North America. Denali is the third most topographically prominent and third most topographically isolated summit on Earth after Mount Everest and Aconcagua.)	Alaska	Alaska Range	20,310 ft 6190.5 m	20,146 ft 6141 m	4,629.37 mi 7,450.24 km	63.0690°N 151.0063°W
2	Mauna Kea (Note: The summit of Mauna Kea is the highest point of the Island of Hawaiʻi, the U.S. State of Hawaiʻi, and all islands of the Pacific Ocean.) (Note: Mauna Kea is the tallest mountain on Earth as measured from base to summit. The shield volcano sits on the ocean floor at a depth of 5998 meters (19,678 feet) for a total height of 10,205.3 meters (33,482 feet).)	Hawaii	Island of Hawaiʻi	13,803 ft 4207.3 m	13,803 ft 4207 m	2,452.5 mi 3,946.92 km	19.8207°N 155.4681°W
3	Mount Whitney (Note: The summit of Mount Whitney is the highest point of the Sierra Nevada, the State of California, and the contiguous United States.) (Note: Mount Whitney is the southernmost and easternmost summit of its elevation in United States.)	California	Sierra Nevada	14,505 ft 4421 m	10,080 ft 3072 m	1,646.3 mi 2,649.47 km	36.5786°N 118.2920°W
4	Mount Mitchell (Note: The summit of Mount Mitchell is the highest point of the Appalachian Mountains, the State of North Carolina, and the eastern United States.) (Note: Mount Mitchell is the easternmost 2000-meter (6562-foot) summit of the United States.) (Note: The elevation of Mount Mitchell includes an adjustment of +0.025 m (0.08 ft) from NGVD 29 to NAVD 88.)	North Carolina	Blue Ridge Mountains	6,684 ft 2037 m	6,092 ft 1857 m	1,188.99 mi 1,913.49 km	35.7649°N 82.2651°W
5	Agrihan Island high point	Northern Mariana Islands	Mariana Islands (Agrihan island)	3,204 ft 977 m	3,204 ft 977 m	1,179.34 mi 1,897.96 km	18.7725°N 145.6678°E
6	Mount Washington (Note: The summit of Mount Washington is the highest point of the White Mountains, the State of New Hampshire, and the northeastern United States.) (Note: Mount Washington is the easternmost ultra-prominent summit of the United States.) (Note: The elevation of Mount Washington includes an adjustment of +0.02 m (0.07 ft) from NGVD 29 to NAVD 88.)	New Hampshire	White Mountains	6,288 ft 1917 m	6,158 ft 1877 m	819.56 mi 1,318.95 km	44.2705°N 71.3032°W
7	Mount Rainier (Note: The summit of Mount Rainier is the highest point of the Cascade Range and the U.S. State of Washington. Mount Rainier is the most prominent summit in the contiguous United States and the fourth most prominent in North America.) (Note: The elevation of Mount Rainier includes an adjustment of +1.914 m (6.28 ft) from NGVD 29 to NAVD 88.)	Washington	Cascade Range	14,417 ft 4394 m	13,210 ft 4026 m	731.18 mi 1,176.72 km	46.8529°N 121.7604°W
8	Mount Elbert (Note: The summit of Mount Elbert is the highest point of the U.S. State of Colorado, the Rocky Mountains of North America, and the entire Mississippi River drainage basin.)	Colorado	Sawatch Range	14,440 ft 4401.2 m	9,093 ft 2772 m	670.55 mi 1,079.15 km	39.1178°N 106.4454°W
9	Shishaldin Volcano (Note: The summit of Shishaldin Volcano is the highest point of Unimak Island and the Aleutian Islands.) (Note: Shishaldin Volcano is the westernmost summit of its elevation in Alaska, the United States, and greater North America.)	Alaska	Unimak Island	9,414 ft 2869 m	9,414 ft 2869 m	545 mi 877 km	54.7554°N 163.9709°W
10	Tanaga Volcano (Note: The summit of Tanaga Volcano is the highest point of Tanaga Island and the Andreanof Islands.) (Note: Tanaga Volcano is the westernmost summit of its elevation in Alaska, the United States, and greater North America.)	Alaska	Tanaga Island	5,925 ft 1806 m	5,925 ft 1806 m	407 mi 656 km	51.8838°N 178.1429°W
11	Mount Isto (Note: The summit of Mount Isto is the highest point of the Brooks Range.) (Note: Mount Isto is the northernmost ultra-prominent summit of Alaska and the United States.)	Alaska	Brooks Range	8,976 ft 2736 m	7,901 ft 2408 m	394 mi 634 km	69.2025°N 143.8020°W
12	Signal Hill (Note: The summit of Signal Hill is the highest point of the Ouachita Mountains and the U.S. State of Arkansas.) (Note: The elevation of Signal Hill includes an adjustment of +0.075 m (0.25 ft) from NGVD 29 to NAVD 88.) (Mount Magazine)	Arkansas	Ouachita Mountains	2,753 ft 839 m	2,143 ft 653 m	381 mi 613 km	35.1671°N 93.6447°W
13	Mount Shasta (Note: The summit of Mount Shasta is the highest point of the southern Cascade Range.)	California	Cascade Range	14,179 ft 4321.8 m	9,772 ft 2979 m	335 mi 539 km	41.4092°N 122.1949°W
14	Gannett Peak (Note: The summit of Gannett Peak is the highest point of the Wind River Range, the U.S. State of Wyoming, and the central Rocky Mountains.) (Note: Gannett Peak is the northernmost and westernmost summit of its elevation in the Rocky Mountains.)	Wyoming	Wind River Range	13,809 ft 4209.1 m	7,076 ft 2157 m	290 mi 467 km	43.1842°N 109.6542°W
15	Mount Osborn (Note: The summit of Mount Osborn is the highest point of the Seward Peninsula.)	Alaska	Seward Peninsula	4,714 ft 1437 m	4,377 ft 1334 m	282 mi 453 km	64.9922°N 165.3294°W
16	Mount Igikpak (Note: The summit of Mount Igikpak is the highest point of the Schwatka Mountains.)	Alaska	Brooks Range	8,276 ft 2523 m	6,126 ft 1867 m	282 mi 453 km	67.4129°N 154.9656°W
17	Humphreys Peak (Note: The summit of Humphreys Peak is the highest point of the San Francisco Peaks and the U.S. State of Arizona.) (Note: The elevation of Humphreys Peak includes an adjustment of +1.345 m (4.41 ft) from NGVD 29 to NAVD 88.)	Arizona	San Francisco Peaks	12,637 ft 3852 m	6,039 ft 1841 m	246 mi 396 km	35.3464°N 111.6780°W
18	Cerro de Punta	Puerto Rico	Cordillera Central	4,390 ft 1,338 m	4,390 ft 1,338 m	244.57 mi 393.59 km	18.1724°N 66.5918°W
19	Wheeler Peak (Note: The summit of Wheeler Peak is the highest point of the Snake Range.)	Nevada	Snake Range	13,065 ft 3982.3 m	7,568 ft 2307 m	232 mi 373 km	38.9858°N 114.3139°W
20	Mount Vsevidof (Note: The summit of Mount Vsevidof is the highest point of Umnak Island and the Fox Islands.) (Note: Mount Vsevidof is the westernmost 2000-meter (6562-foot) summit of Alaska, the United States, and greater North America.)	Alaska	Umnak Island	7,051 ft 2149 m	7,051 ft 2149 m	223 mi 358 km	53.1256°N 168.6938°W
21	Mount Veniaminof (Note: The summit of Mount Veniaminof is the highest point of the Alaska Peninsula.)	Alaska	Alaska Peninsula	8,225 ft 2507 m	8,200 ft 2499 m	209 mi 337 km	56.2194°N 159.2975°W
22	Kawaikini (Note: The summit of Kawaikini is the highest point of the Island of Kauaʻi.)	Hawaii	Island of Kauaʻi	5,243 ft 1598 m	5,243 ft 1598 m	204 mi 328 km	22.0586°N 159.4973°W
23	Hall Island high point	Alaska	Hall Island	1,665 ft 507 m	1,665 ft 507 m	192.9 mi 310 km	60.6647°N 173.0887°W
24	Kuskokwim high point (Note: The summit of Kuskokwim high point is the highest point of the Kuskokwim Mountains.)	Alaska	Kuskokwim Mountains	5,250 ft 1600 m	4,475 ft 1364 m	191.6 mi 308 km	60.1159°N 159.3241°W
25	Spruce Knob (Note: The summit of Spruce Knob is the highest point of the Allegheny Mountains and the U.S. State of West Virginia.)	West Virginia	Allegheny Mountains	4,863 ft 1482.1 m	2,791 ft 851 m	175.4 mi 282 km	38.6999°N 79.5328°W
26	Kings Peak (Note: The summit of Kings Peak is the highest point of the Uinta Mountains, the U.S. State of Utah, and the western Rocky Mountains.) (Note: The elevation of Kings Peak includes an adjustment of +1.807 m (5.93 ft) from NGVD 29 to NAVD 88.)	Utah	Uinta Mountains	13,534 ft 4125 m	6,358 ft 1938 m	166.6 mi 268 km	40.7763°N 110.3729°W
27	Sierra Blanca Peak (Note: The summit of Sierra Blanca Peak is the highest point of the Sacramento Mountains.)	New Mexico	Sacramento Mountains	11,981 ft 3651.8 m	5,553 ft 1693 m	165.7 mi 267 km	33.3743°N 105.8087°W
28	Anatahan Island high point	Northern Mariana Islands	Mariana Islands (Anatahan Island)	2,592 ft 790 m	2,592 ft 790 m	165.65 mi 266.58 km	16.3540°N 145.6572°E
29	San Gorgonio Mountain (Note: The summit of San Gorgonio Mountain is the highest point of the San Bernardino Mountains.) (Note: The elevation of San Gorgonio Mountain includes an adjustment of +1.303 m (4.27 ft) from NGVD 29 to NAVD 88.)	California	San Bernardino Mountains	11,503 ft 3506 m	8,294 ft 2528 m	162.5 mi 262 km	34.0992°N 116.8249°W
30	Katahdin (Note: The summit of Katahdin is the highest point of the Longfellow Mountains and the U.S. State of Maine.) (Note: Katahdin is the easternmost 1000-meter (3281-foot) summit of the United States.)	Maine	Longfellow Mountains	5,270 ft 1606.4 m	4,293 ft 1309 m	158.3 mi 255 km	45.9044°N 68.9213°W
31	Peak 4030 (Note: The summit of Peak 4030 is the highest point of the Nulato Hills.)	Alaska	Nulato Hills	4,030 ft 1228 m	1,640 ft 500 m	158.2 mi 255 km	64.4535°N 159.4152°W
32	Mount Baldy (Note: The summit of Mount Baldy is the highest point of the White Mountains.)	Arizona	White Mountains	11,409 ft 3477.4 m	4,728 ft 1441 m	154 mi 248 km	33.9059°N 109.5626°W
33	Borah Peak (Note: The summit of Borah Peak is the highest point of the Lost River Range and the U.S. State of Idaho.)	Idaho	Lost River Range	12,668 ft 3861.2 m	6,002 ft 1829 m	150.8 mi 243 km	44.1374°N 113.7811°W
34	Lata Mountain	American Samoa	Samoan Islands (Ta‘ū Island)	3,169 ft 966 m	3,169 ft 966 m	149.44 mi 240.5 km	14.2330°S 169.4541°W
35	Cloud Peak (Note: The summit of Cloud Peak is the highest point of the Bighorn Mountains.) (Note: Cloud Peak is the northernmost 4000-meter (13,123-foot) summit of the Rocky Mountains.)	Wyoming	Bighorn Mountains	13,167 ft 4013.3 m	7,077 ft 2157 m	145 mi 233 km	44.3821°N 107.1739°W
36	Black Elk Peak (Note: The summit of Black Elk Peak is the highest point of the Black Hills and the U.S. State of South Dakota.)	South Dakota	Black Hills	7,244 ft 2208 m	2,932 ft 894 m	140.2 mi 226 km	43.8658°N 103.5324°W
37	Slide Mountain (Note: The summit of Slide Mountain is the highest point of the Catskill Mountains.)	New York	Catskill Mountains	4,180 ft 1274 m	3,295 ft 1004 m	136.4 mi 220 km	41.9992°N 74.3859°W
38	Mount Griggs	Alaska	Alaska Peninsula	7,650 ft 2332 m	7,300 ft 2225 m	135.4 mi 218 km	58.3534°N 155.0958°W
39	Charleston Peak (Note: The summit of Charleston Peak is the highest point of the Spring Mountains.) (Mount Charleston)	Nevada	Spring Mountains	11,916 ft 3632 m	8,258 ft 2517 m	135.1 mi 218 km	36.2716°N 115.6956°W
40	Junipero Serra Peak (Note: The summit of Junipero Serra Peak is the highest point of the Santa Lucia Range.) (Note: The elevation of Junipero Serra Peak includes an adjustment of +0.971 m (3.19 ft) from NGVD 29 to NAVD 88.)	California	Santa Lucia Range	5,865 ft 1788 m	4,447 ft 1355 m	131.8 mi 212 km	36.1457°N 121.4191°W
41	Mount Baker (Note: The summit of Mount Baker is the highest point of the northern Cascade Range.) (Note: The elevation of Mount Baker includes an adjustment of +1.43 m (4.69 ft) from NGVD 29 to NAVD 88.)	Washington	Skagit Range	10,786 ft 3287 m	8,845 ft 2696 m	131.5 mi 212 km	48.7768°N 121.8145°W
42	Mount Marcy (Note: The summit of Mount Marcy is the highest point of the Adirondack Mountains, the U.S. State of New York, and the drainage basins of the Gulf of Saint Lawrence and the Hudson River.)	New York	Adirondack Mountains	5,343 ft 1628.57 m	4,919 ft 1499 m	129.6 mi 209 km	44.1127°N 73.9237°W
43	Mount Marcus Baker (Note: The summit of Mount Marcus Baker is the highest point of the Chugach Mountains.)	Alaska	Chugach Mountains	13,176 ft 4016 m	10,751 ft 3277 m	126.3 mi 203 km	61.4374°N 147.7525°W
44	Mount Hayes (Note: The summit of Mount Hayes is the highest point of the Hayes Range.) (Note: Mount Hayes is the northernmost 4000-meter (13,123-foot) summit of Alaska, the United States, and greater North America.)	Alaska	Alaska Range	13,832 ft 4216 m	11,507 ft 3507 m	125.5 mi 202 km	63.6203°N 146.7178°W
45	Sacajawea Peak (Oregon) (Note: The summit of Sacajawea Peak (Oregon) is the highest point of the Wallowa Mountains and the Columbia Plateau.) (Note: The elevation of Sacajawea Peak (Oregon) includes an adjustment of +1.56 m (5.12 ft) from NGVD 29 to NAVD 88.)	Oregon	Wallowa Mountains	9,843 ft 3000 m	6,393 ft 1949 m	125.5 mi 202 km	45.2450°N 117.2929°W
46	Steens Mountain (Note: The elevation of Steens Mountain includes an adjustment of +1.496 m (4.91 ft) from NGVD 29 to NAVD 88.)	Oregon	Steens Mountain	9,738 ft 2968 m	4,383 ft 1336 m	124.7 mi 201 km	42.6364°N 118.5767°W
47	Mount Fairweather (Note: Mount Fairweather lies on the international border between Alaska and British Columbia. The peak is the highest point of the Canadian Province of British Columbia and the southernmost and easternmost summit of its elevation in both Canada and the United States.) (Fairweather Mountain)	Alaska; British Columbia	Saint Elias Mountains	15,325 ft 4671 m	12,995 ft 3961 m	124.4 mi 200 km	58.9064°N 137.5265°W
48	Tooth Benchmark (Note: The summit of Tooth Benchmark is the highest point of Saint Lawrence Island and the islands of the Bering Sea.)	Alaska	Saint Lawrence Island	2,207 ft 673 m	2,207 ft 673 m	112.5 mi 181.1 km	63.5920°N 170.3804°W
49	Delano Peak (Note: The summit of Delano Peak is the highest point of the Tushar Mountains.)	Utah	Tushar Mountains	12,174 ft 3710.7 m	4,709 ft 1435 m	112.1 mi 180.5 km	38.3692°N 112.3714°W
50	Mount Olympus (Note: The summit of Mount Olympus is the highest point of the Olympic Mountains.)	Washington	Olympic Mountains	7,980 ft 2432.3 m	7,838 ft 2389 m	108 mi 173.7 km	47.8013°N 123.7108°W
51	Black Mountain (Note: The summit of Black Mountain is the highest point of the De Long Mountains.)	Alaska	Brooks Range	5,020 ft 1530 m	3,346 ft 1020 m	103.5 mi 166.6 km	68.5598°N 160.3281°W
52	Blanca Peak (Note: The summit of Blanca Peak is the highest point of the Sangre de Cristo Mountains and the entire Rio Grande drainage basin.) (Note: Blanca Peak is the southernmost ultra-prominent summit of the Rocky Mountains.) (Note: The elevation of Blanca Peak includes an adjustment of +1.755 m (5.76 ft) from NGVD 29 to NAVD 88.)	Colorado	Sangre de Cristo Mountains	14,351 ft 4374 m	5,326 ft 1623 m	103.4 mi 166.4 km	37.5775°N 105.4856°W
53	Mount Tozi (Note: The summit of Mount Tozi is the highest point of the Ray Mountains.)	Alaska	Ray Mountains	5,519 ft 1682 m	4,169 ft 1271 m	99.5 mi 160.1 km	65.6865°N 150.9498°W
54	Mount Cleveland (Note: The summit of Mount Cleveland is the highest point of the Lewis Range.)	Montana	Lewis Range	10,479 ft 3194 m	5,246 ft 1599 m	99.4 mi 159.9 km	48.9249°N 113.8482°W
55	Mount Jefferson (Note: The summit of Mount Jefferson is the highest point of the Toquima Range.) (Note: The elevation of Mount Jefferson includes an adjustment of +1.666 m (5.47 ft) from NGVD 29 to NAVD 88.)	Nevada	Toquima Range	11,946 ft 3641 m	5,871 ft 1789 m	98.6 mi 158.7 km	38.7519°N 116.9267°W
56	Mount Torbert (Note: The summit of Mount Torbert is the highest point of the Tordrillo Mountains.) (Note: Mount Torbert is the westernmost summit of its elevation in Alaska and greater North America.)	Alaska	Alaska Range	11,413 ft 3479 m	8,688 ft 2648 m	97.7 mi 157.3 km	61.4086°N 152.4125°W
57	Mount Chiginagak	Alaska	Aleutian Range	6,925 ft 2111 m	6,675 ft 2035 m	97.6 mi 157 km	57.1334°N 156.9912°W
58	Baldy Peak (Note: The summit of Baldy Peak is the highest point of the Davis Mountains.) (Note: Baldy Peak is the easternmost summit of its elevation in the United States.)	Texas	Davis Mountains	8,381 ft 2554.5 m	3,923 ft 1196 m	95.4 mi 153.6 km	30.6356°N 104.1737°W
59	Hualapai Peak (Note: The summit of Hualapai Peak is the highest point of the Hualapai Mountains.)	Arizona	Hualapai Mountains	8,426 ft 2568.2 m	4,439 ft 1353 m	95.2 mi 153.2 km	35.0751°N 113.8979°W
60	Ruby Dome (Note: The summit of Ruby Dome is the highest point of the Ruby Mountains.) (Note: The elevation of Ruby Dome includes an adjustment of +1.429 m (4.69 ft) from NGVD 29 to NAVD 88.)	Nevada	Ruby Mountains	11,392 ft 3472 m	4,810 ft 1466 m	94.7 mi 152.5 km	40.6217°N 115.4754°W
61	Mount Pavlof (Note: The summit of Mount Pavlof is the highest point of the Alaska Peninsula.)	Alaska	Alaska Peninsula	8,250 ft 2515 m	8,200 ft 2499 m	94.3 mi 151.8 km	55.4173°N 161.8932°W
62	South Baldy (Note: The summit of South Baldy is the highest point of the Magdalena Mountains.)	New Mexico	Magdalena Mountains	10,787 ft 3288 m	3,813 ft 1162 m	88.1 mi 141.7 km	33.9910°N 107.1879°W
63	Truuli Peak (Note: The summit of Truuli Peak is the highest point of the Kenai Mountains.)	Alaska	Kenai Mountains	6,612 ft 2015 m	6,062 ft 1848 m	87.8 mi 141.3 km	59.9129°N 150.4348°W
64	Great Sitkin Volcano (Note: The summit of Great Sitkin Volcano is the highest point of Great Sitkin Island.)	Alaska	Great Sitkin Island	5,710 ft 1740 m	5,710 ft 1740 m	87.8 mi 141.3 km	52.0763°N 176.1108°W
65	Eagle Peak (Note: The summit of Eagle Peak is the highest point of the Warner Mountains.)	California	Warner Mountains	9,895 ft 3016 m	4,362 ft 1330 m	87.4 mi 140.6 km	41.2835°N 120.2007°W
66	Mount Taylor (Note: The summit of Mount Taylor is the highest point of the northern San Mateo Mountains.)	New Mexico	San Mateo Mountains	11,305 ft 3445.9 m	4,094 ft 1248 m	86.8 mi 139.6 km	35.2387°N 107.6085°W
67	Accomplishment Peak (Note: The summit of Accomplishment Peak is the highest point of the Philip Smith Mountains.)	Alaska	Brooks Range	8,045 ft 2452 m	4,195 ft 1279 m	86.5 mi 139.2 km	68.4433°N 148.0947°W
68	Granite Peak (Note: The summit of Granite Peak is the highest point of the Beartooth Mountains and the U.S. State of Montana.)	Montana	Beartooth Mountains	12,807 ft 3903.5 m	4,779 ft 1457 m	86 mi 138.5 km	45.1634°N 109.8075°W
69	Kiska Volcano (Note: The summit of Kiska Volcano is the highest point of Kiska Island.) (Note: Kiska Volcano is the westernmost 1000-meter (3281-foot) summit of Alaska, the United States, and greater North America.)	Alaska	Kiska Island	4,004 ft 1220 m	4,004 ft 1220 m	85.6 mi 137.7 km	52.1027°N 177.6030°E
70	Korovin Volcano (Note: The summit of Korovin Volcano is the highest point of Atka Island.)	Alaska	Atka Island	5,030 ft 1533 m	5,030 ft 1533 m	85.2 mi 137.2 km	52.3816°N 174.1653°W
71	Uncompahgre Peak (Note: The summit of Uncompahgre Peak is the highest point of the San Juan Mountains and the entire Gulf of California drainage basin.) (Note: Uncompahgre Peak is the westernmost summit of its elevation in the Rocky Mountains.)	Colorado	San Juan Mountains	14,321 ft 4365 m	4,277 ft 1304 m	85 mi 136.8 km	38.0717°N 107.4621°W
72	Devils Paw (Note: The summit of Devils Paw is the highest point of the Juneau Icefield.)	Alaska; British Columbia	Coast Mountains	8,507 ft 2593 m	5,587 ft 1703 m	84.7 mi 136.3 km	58.7289°N 133.8402°W
73	Kaʻala (Note: The summit of Kaʻala is the highest point of the Island of Oʻahu.)	Hawaii	Island of Oʻahu	4,060 ft 1237 m	4,060 ft 1237 m	84.4 mi 135.8 km	21.5079°N 158.1426°W
74	Koniag Peak (Note: The summit of Koniag Peak is the highest point of Kodiak Island.)	Alaska	Kodiak Island	4,520 ft 1378 m	4,520 ft 1378 m	84.2 mi 135.5 km	57.3548°N 153.3235°W
75	Makushin Volcano (Note: The summit of Makushin Volcano is the highest point of Unalaska Island.)	Alaska	Unalaska Island	5,905 ft 1800 m	5,905 ft 1800 m	83.1 mi 133.8 km	53.8782°N 166.9299°W
76	Mount Pinos (Note: The summit of Mount Pinos is the highest point of the San Emigdio Mountains.)	California	San Emigdio Mountains	8,847 ft 2696.5 m	4,800 ft 1463 m	82.9 mi 133.5 km	34.8128°N 119.1454°W
77	Snowshoe Peak (Note: The summit of Snowshoe Peak is the highest point of the Cabinet Mountains.) (Note: The elevation of Snowshoe Peak includes an adjustment of +1.367 m (4.48 ft) from NGVD 29 to NAVD 88.)	Montana	Cabinet Mountains	8,743 ft 2665 m	5,438 ft 1658 m	82.9 mi 133.5 km	48.2231°N 115.6890°W
78	Mount Graham (Note: The summit of Mount Graham is the highest point of the Pinaleño Mountains.)	Arizona	Pinaleño Mountains	10,724 ft 3268.6 m	6,340 ft 1932 m	82.4 mi 132.6 km	32.7017°N 109.8714°W
79	Granite Peak (Note: The summit of Granite Peak is the highest point of the Santa Rosa Range.)	Nevada	Santa Rosa Range	9,732 ft 2966.3 m	4,400 ft 1341 m	82.4 mi 132.6 km	41.6681°N 117.5889°W
80	Cache Peak (Note: The summit of Cache Peak is the highest point of the Albion Range.)	Idaho	Albion Range	10,343 ft 3152.5 m	4,479 ft 1365 m	81.8 mi 131.6 km	42.1856°N 113.6611°W
81	West Butte (Note: The summit of West Butte is the highest point of the Sweetgrass Hills.) (Note: The elevation of West Butte includes an adjustment of +1.061 m (3.48 ft) from NGVD 29 to NAVD 88.)	Montana	Sweetgrass Hills	6,986 ft 2129 m	3,638 ft 1109 m	80.9 mi 130.2 km	48.9316°N 111.5324°W
82	Alamagan Island high point	Northern Mariana Islands	Mariana Islands (Alamagan Island)	2,441 ft 744 m	2,441 ft 744 m	80.56 mi 129.66 km	17.6025°N 145.8301°E
83	Veniaminof Peak (Note: The summit of Veniaminof Peak is the highest point of Baranof Island.)	Alaska	Baranof Island	5,390 ft 1643 m	5,390 ft 1643 m	79.7 mi 128.3 km	57.0151°N 134.9882°W
84	McDonald Peak (Note: The summit of McDonald Peak is the highest point of the Mission Range.) (Note: The elevation of McDonald Peak includes an adjustment of +1.318 m (4.32 ft) from NGVD 29 to NAVD 88.)	Montana	Mission Range	9,824 ft 2994 m	5,650 ft 1722 m	79.4 mi 127.8 km	47.3826°N 113.9191°W
85	Hilgard Peak (Note: The summit of Hilgard Peak is the highest point of the Madison Range.) (Note: The elevation of Hilgard Peak includes an adjustment of +1.49 m (4.89 ft) from NGVD 29 to NAVD 88.)	Montana	Madison Range	11,321 ft 3451 m	4,063 ft 1238 m	76.4 mi 123 km	44.9166°N 111.4593°W
86	Haleakalā (Note: The summit of Haleakalā is the highest point of the Island of Maui and the westernmost 3000 meter (9842.5-foot) summit of the United States.)	Hawaii	Island of Maui	10,023 ft 3055 m	10,023 ft 3055 m	76.3 mi 122.9 km	20.7097°N 156.2533°W
87	Mount Nebo (Note: The summit of Mount Nebo is the highest point of the Wasatch Range.) (Note: The elevation of Mount Nebo includes an adjustment of +1.395 m (4.58 ft) from NGVD 29 to NAVD 88.)	Utah	Wasatch Range	11,933 ft 3637 m	5,508 ft 1679 m	75.6 mi 121.6 km	39.8219°N 111.7603°W
88	Tweedy Mountain (Note: The summit of Tweedy Mountain is the highest point of the Pioneer Mountains.) (Note: The elevation of Tweedy Mountain includes an adjustment of +1.598 m (5.24 ft) from NGVD 29 to NAVD 88.)	Montana	Pioneer Mountains	11,159 ft 3401 m	3,814 ft 1163 m	75 mi 120.7 km	45.4805°N 112.9655°W
89	Blackburn Hills	Alaska	Nulato Hills	3,295 ft 1004 m	1,640 ft 500 m	73.9 mi 118.9 km	63.4107°N 159.6559°W
90	Buldir Volcano (Note: The summit of Buldir Volcano is the highest point of Buldir Island.) (Note: Buldir Volcano is the westernmost 500-meter (1640-foot) summit of Alaska, the United States, and greater North America.)	Alaska	Buldir Island	2,152 ft 656 m	2,152 ft 656 m	73.8 mi 118.7 km	52.3482°N 175.9105°E
91	Mount Tom White	Alaska	Chugach Mountains	11,191 ft 3411 m	7,641 ft 2329 m	73 mi 117.6 km	60.6518°N 143.6972°W
92	Mount Peale (Note: The summit of Mount Peale is the highest point of the La Sal Mountains and the Colorado Plateau.)	Utah	La Sal Mountains	12,726 ft 3879 m	6,181 ft 1884 m	72.8 mi 117.1 km	38.4385°N 109.2292°W
93	Guadalupe Peak (Note: The summit of Guadalupe Peak is the highest point of the Guadalupe Mountains and the U.S. State of Texas.) (Note: The elevation of Guadalupe Peak includes an adjustment of +0.681 m (2.23 ft) from NGVD 29 to NAVD 88.)	Texas	Guadalupe Mountains	8,751 ft 2667 m	3,039 ft 926 m	72.6 mi 116.9 km	31.8916°N 104.8606°W
94	Cinnabar Mountain (Note: The summit of Cinnabar Mountain is the highest point of the Owyhee Mountains.)	Idaho	Owyhee Mountains	8,409 ft 2563.2 m	3,133 ft 955 m	71.5 mi 115.1 km	42.9805°N 116.6575°W
95	Lassen Peak	California	Cascade Range	10,462 ft 3188.7 m	5,229 ft 1594 m	71.4 mi 114.9 km	40.4882°N 121.5050°W
96	Kuwohi (Note: Kuwohi on the border of North Carolina is the highest point of the U.S. State of Tennessee and the Great Smoky Mountains.) (Note: The elevation of Kuwohi includes an adjustment of +0.062 m (0.2 ft) from NGVD 29 to NAVD 88.)	Tennessee; North Carolina	Great Smoky Mountains	6,643 ft 2025 m	4,513 ft 1376 m	70.7 mi 113.9 km	35.5629°N 83.4986°W
97	Anvil Peak (Note: The summit of Anvil Peak is the highest point of Semisopochnoi Island and the Rat Islands.) (Note: Anvil Peak is the westernmost summit of its elevation in Alaska, the United States, and greater North America.)	Alaska	Semisopochnoi Island	4,007 ft 1221 m	4,007 ft 1221 m	70 mi 112.6 km	51.9859°N 179.6021°E
98	Mount McLoughlin (Note: The summit of Mount McLoughlin is the highest point of the southern Oregon Cascades.) (Note: The elevation of Mount McLoughlin includes an adjustment of +1.306 m (4.28 ft) from NGVD 29 to NAVD 88.)	Oregon	Cascade Range	9,499 ft 2895 m	4,475 ft 1364 m	69.5 mi 111.8 km	42.4445°N 122.3156°W
99	Grand Teton (Note: The summit of Grand Teton is the highest point of the Teton Range.) (Note: Grand Teton is the northernmost and westernmost 4000-meter (13,123-foot) summit of the Rocky Mountains.)	Wyoming	Teton Range	13,775 ft 4198.7 m	6,545 ft 1995 m	69.4 mi 111.6 km	43.7412°N 110.8024°W
100	Kaibab Plateau high point (Note: The elevation of Kaibab Plateau high point includes an adjustment of +1.301 m (4.27 ft) from NGVD 29 to NAVD 88.)	Arizona	Kaibab Plateau	9,224 ft 2812 m	3,610 ft 1100 m	69.1 mi 111.2 km	36.3958°N 112.1509°W
101	Star Peak (Note: The summit of Star Peak is the highest point of the Humboldt Range.)	Nevada	Humboldt Range	9,840 ft 2999.1 m	5,400 ft 1646 m	69 mi 111.1 km	40.5224°N 118.1708°W
102	White Mountain Peak (Note: The summit of White Mountain Peak is the highest point of the White Mountains.)	California	White Mountains	14,252 ft 4344 m	7,196 ft 2193 m	67.4 mi 108.6 km	37.6341°N 118.2557°W
103	Laramie Peak	Wyoming	Laramie Mountains	10,276 ft 3132 m	3,317 ft 1011 m	67.4 mi 108.4 km	42.2681°N 105.4425°W
104	Miller Peak (Note: The summit of Miller Peak is the highest point of the Huachuca Mountains.) (Note: The elevation of Miller Peak includes an adjustment of +1.067 m (3.5 ft) from NGVD 29 to NAVD 88.)	Arizona	Huachuca Mountains	9,470 ft 2886 m	5,011 ft 1527 m	66.5 mi 107 km	31.3928°N 110.2930°W
105	Kusilvak high point	Alaska	Nulato Hills	2,905 ft 885 m	1,830 ft 558 m	65.7 mi 105.8 km	62.9285°N 161.7461°W
106	Copernicus Peak (Note: The elevation of Copernicus Peak includes an adjustment of +0.924 m (3.03 ft) from NGVD 29 to NAVD 88.)	California	Diablo Range	4,383 ft 1336 m	3,120 ft 951 m	65.2 mi 104.9 km	37.3468°N 121.6300°W
107	Sugarloaf Mountain (Note: The elevation of Sugarloaf Mountain includes an adjustment of -0.119 m (-0.39 ft) from NGVD 29 to NAVD 88.)	Maine	Longfellow Mountains	4,250 ft 1295 m	3,178 ft 969 m	64.8 mi 104.3 km	45.0318°N 70.3132°W
108	Asuncion Island high point	Northern Mariana Islands	Mariana Islands (Asuncion Island)	2,812 ft 857 m	2,812 ft 857 m	64.3 mi 103.48 km	19.6927°N 145.4023°E
109	Chiricahua Peak (Note: The summit of Chiricahua Peak is the highest point of the Chiricahua Mountains.) (Note: The elevation of Chiricahua Peak includes an adjustment of +1.173 m (3.85 ft) from NGVD 29 to NAVD 88.)	Arizona	Chiricahua Mountains	9,763 ft 2976 m	5,149 ft 1569 m	64.2 mi 103.3 km	31.8456°N 109.2910°W
110	Mount Harper	Alaska	Yukon–Tanana uplands	6,543 ft 1994 m	1,640 ft 500 m	63.8 mi 102.7 km	64.2370°N 143.8442°W
111	Mount Angayukaqsraq (Note: The summit of Mount Angayukaqsraq is the highest point of the Baird Mountains.)	Alaska	Brooks Range	4,750 ft 1448 m	3,500 ft 1067 m	63.6 mi 102.4 km	67.7083°N 159.4053°W
112	Mount Prindle	Alaska	Yukon–Tanana uplands	5,286 ft 1611 m	2,836 ft 864 m	62.9 mi 101.2 km	65.4610°N 146.4758°W
113	Bearpaw Baldy (Note: The summit of Bearpaw Baldy is the highest point of the Bearpaw Mountains.)	Montana	Bearpaw Mountains	6,921 ft 2109.4 m	4,229 ft 1289 m	62.8 mi 101 km	48.1487°N 109.6509°W
114	Naomi Peak (Note: The summit of Naomi Peak is the highest point of the Bear River Mountains.)	Utah	Wasatch Range	9,984 ft 3043 m	3,169 ft 966 m	61.5 mi 98.9 km	41.9114°N 111.6754°W
115	Mount Linn (Note: The summit of Mount Linn is the highest point of the Northern California Coast Range.) (Note: The elevation of Mount Linn includes an adjustment of +1.148 m (3.77 ft) from NGVD 29 to NAVD 88.)	California	Northern California Coast Range	8,098 ft 2468 m	4,854 ft 1480 m	61.5 mi 98.9 km	40.0365°N 122.8542°W
116	Mount Ajo (Note: The elevation of Mount Ajo includes an adjustment of +0.793 m (2.6 ft) from NGVD 29 to NAVD 88.)	Arizona	Ajo Range	4,811 ft 1466 m	2,703 ft 824 m	61.2 mi 98.5 km	32.0268°N 112.6906°W
117	Ibapah Peak (Note: The summit of Ibapah Peak is the highest point of the Deep Creek Range.) (Note: The elevation of Ibapah Peak includes an adjustment of +1.517 m (4.98 ft) from NGVD 29 to NAVD 88.)	Utah	Deep Creek Range	12,092 ft 3686 m	5,267 ft 1605 m	61.2 mi 98.5 km	39.8282°N 113.9200°W
118	Rogers Peak (Note: The summit of Rogers Peak is the highest point of the northern Oregon Coast Range.) (Note: The elevation of Rogers Peak includes an adjustment of +1.109 m (3.64 ft) from NGVD 29 to NAVD 88.)	Oregon	Oregon Coast Range	3,710 ft 1131 m	3,034 ft 925 m	60.8 mi 97.9 km	45.6649°N 123.5481°W
119	Pyre Peak (Note: The summit of Pyre Peak is the highest point of Seguam Island.)	Alaska	Seguam Island	3,458 ft 1054 m	3,458 ft 1054 m	60.7 mi 97.7 km	52.3159°N 172.5106°W
120	Mount Blackburn (Note: The summit of Mount Blackburn is the highest point of the Wrangell Mountains.)	Alaska	Wrangell Mountains	16,390 ft 4996 m	11,640 ft 3548 m	60.7 mi 97.6 km	61.7305°N 143.4031°W
121	Pikes Peak (Note: Pikes Peak is the easternmost 14,000-foot (4267-meter) summit and ultra-prominent summit of the Rocky Mountains. Pikes Peak was the inspiration for the lyrics of America the Beautiful.)	Colorado	Front Range	14,115 ft 4302.31 m	5,530 ft 1686 m	60.6 mi 97.6 km	38.8405°N 105.0442°W
122	Matafao Peak	American Samoa	Samoan Islands (Tutuila Island)	2,142 ft 653 m	2,142 ft 653 m	60.58 mi 97.5 km	14.2990°S 170.7030°W
123	Matterhorn (Note: The summit of Matterhorn is the highest point of the Jarbidge Mountains.) (Note: The elevation of Matterhorn includes an adjustment of +1.429 m (4.69 ft) from NGVD 29 to NAVD 88.)	Nevada	Jarbidge Mountains	10,843 ft 3305 m	4,688 ft 1429 m	60.4 mi 97.2 km	41.8107°N 115.3745°W
124	Roof Butte (Note: The summit of Roof Butte is the highest point of the Chuska Mountains.)	Arizona	Chuska Mountains	9,787 ft 2983.1 m	3,170 ft 966 m	59.3 mi 95.5 km	36.4602°N 109.0931°W
125	Redoubt Volcano (Note: The summit of Redoubt Volcano is the highest point of the Chigmit Mountains.) (Note: Redoubt Volcano is the westernmost summit of its elevation in Alaska and greater North America.)	Alaska	Chigmit Mountains	10,197 ft 3108 m	9,147 ft 2788 m	58.7 mi 94.5 km	60.4854°N 152.7442°W
126	Navajo Mountain	Utah	Colorado Plateau	10,348 ft 3154.2 m	4,236 ft 1291 m	58.6 mi 94.3 km	37.0343°N 110.8697°W
127	Mooseheart Mountain	Alaska	Kuskokwim Mountains	2,136 ft 651 m	1,640 ft 500 m	58.5 mi 94.1 km	64.7452°N 151.0514°W
128	Mount Hesperus (Note: The summit of Mount Hesperus is the highest point of the western Alaska Range.) (Note: Mount Hesperus is the westernmost summit of its elevation in Alaska and greater North America.)	Alaska	Alaska Range	9,828 ft 2996 m	6,978 ft 2127 m	58.1 mi 93.5 km	61.8036°N 154.1469°W
129	Mount Hood (Note: The summit of Mount Hood is the highest point of the Oregon Cascades and the U.S. State of Oregon.)	Oregon	Cascade Range	11,249 ft 3428.8 m	7,706 ft 2349 m	57.3 mi 92.2 km	45.3735°N 121.6959°W
130	Telescope Peak (Note: The summit of Telescope Peak is the highest point of the Panamint Range.)	California	Panamint Range	11,043 ft 3366 m	6,188 ft 1886 m	57.2 mi 92 km	36.1698°N 117.0892°W
131	Virgin Peak (Note: The summit of Virgin Peak is the highest point of the Virgin Mountains.) (Note: The elevation of Virgin Peak includes an adjustment of +0.888 m (2.91 ft) from NGVD 29 to NAVD 88.)	Nevada	Virgin Mountains	8,090 ft 2466 m	3,215 ft 980 m	56.8 mi 91.5 km	36.6027°N 114.1123°W
132	Mount Cleveland (Note: The summit of Mount Cleveland is the highest point of Chuginadak Island.)	Alaska	Chuginadak Island	5,675 ft 1730 m	5,675 ft 1730 m	56.3 mi 90.6 km	52.8230°N 169.9465°W
132	Prince of Wales Island high point	Alaska	Prince of Wales Island	3,996 ft 1218 m	3,996 ft 1218 m	56.3 mi 90.6 km	55.5373°N 132.8773°W
134	Glacier Peak (Note: The elevation of Glacier Peak includes an adjustment of +1.492 m (4.9 ft) from NGVD 29 to NAVD 88.)	Washington	Cascade Range	10,545 ft 3214 m	7,518 ft 2291 m	56 mi 90.2 km	48.1125°N 121.1138°W
135	Mount Ellen (Note: The summit of Mount Ellen is the highest point of the Henry Mountains.) (Note: The elevation of Mount Ellen includes an adjustment of +1.486 m (4.88 ft) from NGVD 29 to NAVD 88.)	Utah	Henry Mountains	11,527 ft 3513 m	5,862 ft 1787 m	56 mi 90.2 km	38.1089°N 110.8136°W
136	Mount Kimball (Note: The summit of Mount Kimball is the highest point of the Delta Range.)	Alaska	Alaska Range	10,350 ft 3155 m	7,425 ft 2263 m	55.8 mi 89.8 km	63.2390°N 144.6419°W
137	Ferris Mountain (Note: The summit of Ferris Mountain is the highest point of the Ferris Mountains.)	Wyoming	Ferris Mountains	10,071 ft 3069.6 m	3,282 ft 1000 m	55.3 mi 89 km	42.2566°N 107.2394°W
138	Pilot Peak (Note: The summit of Pilot Peak is the highest point of the Pilot Range.)	Nevada	Pilot Range	10,720 ft 3267.6 m	5,731 ft 1747 m	53.7 mi 86.4 km	41.0211°N 114.0774°W
139	Currant Mountain (Note: The summit of Currant Mountain is the highest point of the White Pine Range.)	Nevada	White Pine Range	11,518 ft 3510.7 m	4,575 ft 1394 m	52.8 mi 85 km	38.9097°N 115.4246°W
140	Red Mountain (Note: The summit of Red Mountain is the highest point of the Flathead Range.)	Montana	Flathead Range	9,413 ft 2869.1 m	3,801 ft 1159 m	52.4 mi 84.3 km	47.1166°N 112.7388°W
141	Mount Mansfield (Note: The summit of Mount Mansfield is the highest point of the Green Mountains and the U.S. State of Vermont.) (Note: The elevation of Mount Mansfield includes an adjustment of -0.044 m (-0.14 ft) from NGVD 29 to NAVD 88.)	Vermont	Green Mountains	4,393 ft 1339 m	3,643 ft 1110 m	51.9 mi 83.6 km	44.5438°N 72.8144°W
142	Mount Lemmon (Note: The summit of Mount Lemmon is the highest point of the Santa Catalina Mountains.) (Note: The elevation of Mount Lemmon includes an adjustment of +1.004 m (3.29 ft) from NGVD 29 to NAVD 88.)	Arizona	Santa Catalina Mountains	9,160 ft 2792 m	5,177 ft 1578 m	51.5 mi 82.9 km	32.4430°N 110.7885°W
143	Wyoming Peak (Note: The summit of Wyoming Peak is the highest point of the Wyoming Range.)	Wyoming	Wyoming Range	11,423 ft 3481.6 m	3,558 ft 1084 m	50.8 mi 81.8 km	42.6043°N 110.6238°W
144	Mount Bona (Note: The summit of Mount Bona is the highest point of the northwest Saint Elias Mountains.)	Alaska	Saint Elias Mountains	16,550 ft 5044 m	6,900 ft 2103 m	49.7 mi 80 km	61.3856°N 141.7495°W
145	Peak 4085	Alaska	Kobuk-Koyukuk Ranges	4,085 ft 1245 m	1,640 ft 500 m	49.4 mi 79.5 km	66.2398°N 156.0071°W
146	Mount Jefferson (Note: The elevation of Mount Jefferson includes an adjustment of +1.388 m (4.55 ft) from NGVD 29 to NAVD 88.)	Oregon	Cascade Range	10,502 ft 3201 m	5,797 ft 1767 m	48.1 mi 77.5 km	44.6743°N 121.7996°W
147	Rocky Mountain (Note: The summit of Rocky Mountain is the highest point of the Rocky Mountain Front.)	Montana	Rocky Mountain Front	9,398 ft 2864.4 m	3,252 ft 991 m	48.1 mi 77.4 km	47.8123°N 112.8003°W
148	Francs Peak (Note: The summit of Francs Peak is the highest point of the Absaroka Range.)	Wyoming	Absaroka Range	13,164 ft 4012.3 m	4,056 ft 1236 m	47.2 mi 76 km	43.9613°N 109.3392°W
149	Oregon Butte (Note: The summit of Oregon Butte is the highest point of the northern Blue Mountains.) (Note: The summit elevation of Oregon Butte includes a vertical offset of +0.203 m (0.7 ft) from the station benchmark.)	Washington	Blue Mountains	6,391 ft 1947.9 m	2,417 ft 737 m	46.5 mi 74.8 km	46.1104°N 117.6797°W
150	Emory Peak (Note: The summit of Emory Peak is the highest point of the Chisos Mountains.) (Note: Emory Peak is the easternmost summit of its elevation in the United States.)	Texas	Chisos Mountains	7,812 ft 2381 m	4,495 ft 1370 m	46.2 mi 74.3 km	29.2460°N 103.3053°W
151	Deseret Peak (Note: The summit of Deseret Peak is the highest point of the Stansbury Mountains.)	Utah	Stansbury Mountains	11,035 ft 3364 m	5,812 ft 1772 m	46 mi 74 km	40.4595°N 112.6264°W
152	Big Baldy Mountain (Note: The summit of Big Baldy Mountain is the highest point of the Little Belt Mountains.) (Note: The elevation of Big Baldy Mountain includes an adjustment of +1.183 m (3.88 ft) from NGVD 29 to NAVD 88.)	Montana	Little Belt Mountains	9,181 ft 2798 m	3,567 ft 1087 m	45.8 mi 73.6 km	46.9685°N 110.6064°W
153	Mount Adams	Washington	Cascade Range	12,281 ft 3743.4 m	8,136 ft 2480 m	45.8 mi 73.6 km	46.2024°N 121.4909°W
154	Sovereign Mountain (Note: The summit of Sovereign Mountain is the highest point of the Talkeetna Mountains.)	Alaska	Talkeetna Mountains	8,849 ft 2697 m	5,874 ft 1790 m	45.6 mi 73.5 km	62.1311°N 148.6044°W
155	Chagulak Volcano (Note: The summit of Chagulak Volcano is the highest point of Chagulak Island.)	Alaska	Chagulak Island	1143 m 3,750 ft	1143 m 3,750 ft	71.9 km 44.6 mi	52.5711°N 171.1388°W
156	Crazy Peak (Note: The summit of Crazy Peak is the highest point of the Crazy Mountains.) (Note: The elevation of Crazy Peak includes an adjustment of +1.421 m (4.66 ft) from NGVD 29 to NAVD 88.)	Montana	Crazy Mountains	11,214 ft 3418 m	5,719 ft 1743 m	44.6 mi 71.8 km	46.0181°N 110.2768°W
157	Mount Stuart (Note: The summit of Mount Stuart is the highest point of the Wenatchee Mountains.) (Note: The elevation of Mount Stuart includes an adjustment of +1.388 m (4.55 ft) from NGVD 29 to NAVD 88.)	Washington	Wenatchee Mountains	9,420 ft 2871 m	5,354 ft 1632 m	44.5 mi 71.6 km	47.4751°N 120.9024°W
158	Longs Peak (Note: The summit of Longs Peak is the highest point of the northern Front Range.) (Note: Longs Peak is the northernmost 14,000-foot (4267-meter) summit of the Rocky Mountains.)	Colorado	Front Range	14,259 ft 4346 m	2,940 ft 896 m	43.6 mi 70.2 km	40.2550°N 105.6151°W
159	El Toro (Southwest Peak)	Puerto Rico	Sierra de Luquillo	3,524 ft 1,074 m	3,525 ft 1,074 m	43.37 mi 69.8 km	18.2721°N 65.8292°W
160	De Long Peak (Peak 8084)	Alaska	Chugach Mountains	8,084 ft 2464 m	6,234 ft 1900 m	43.1 mi 69.3 km	60.8299°N 145.1335°W
161	Mount Douglas	Alaska	Alaska Peninsula	7,050 ft 2149 m	6,300 ft 1920 m	42.9 mi 69 km	58.8598°N 153.5353°W
162	Brian Head (Note: The summit of Brian Head is the highest point of the Markagunt Plateau.) (Note: The elevation of Brian Head includes an adjustment of +1.556 m (5.1 ft) from NGVD 29 to NAVD 88.)	Utah	Markagunt Plateau	11,312 ft 3448 m	3,767 ft 1148 m	42.5 mi 68.5 km	37.6812°N 112.8312°W
163	Mount San Antonio (Note: The summit of Mount San Antonio is the highest point of the San Gabriel Mountains.) (Note: The elevation of Mount San Antonio includes an adjustment of +1.214 m (3.98 ft) from NGVD 29 to NAVD 88.)	California	San Gabriel Mountains	10,068 ft 3069 m	6,244 ft 1903 m	42.5 mi 68.4 km	34.2891°N 117.6463°W
164	Truchas Peak (Note: The summit of Truchas Peak is the highest point of the Santa Fe Mountains.) (Note: Truchas Peak is the southernmost summit of its elevation in the Rocky Mountains.)	New Mexico	Santa Fe Mountains	13,108 ft 3995.2 m	4,001 ft 1220 m	42.3 mi 68.2 km	35.9625°N 105.6450°W
165	Mount Akutan (Note: The summit of Mount Akutan is the highest point of Akutan Island.)	Alaska	Akutan Island	1296 m 4,251 ft	1296 m 4,251 ft	68.1 km 42.3 mi	54.1330°N 165.9854°W
166	Mount Kanaga (Note: The summit of Mount Kanaga is the highest point of Kanaga Island.)	Alaska	Kanaga Island	1307 m 4,287 ft	1307 m 4,287 ft	67.6 km 42 mi	51.9238°N 177.1623°W
167	Flat Top Mountain (Note: The summit of Flat Top Mountain is the highest point of the Flat Tops.)	Colorado	Flat Tops	12,361 ft 3767.7 m	4,054 ft 1236 m	40.8 mi 65.6 km	40.0147°N 107.0833°W
168	Trapper Peak (Note: The summit of Trapper Peak is the highest point of the central Bitterroot Range.) (Note: The elevation of Trapper Peak includes an adjustment of +1.367 m (4.48 ft) from NGVD 29 to NAVD 88.)	Montana	Bitterroot Range	10,162 ft 3097 m	3,570 ft 1088 m	40.8 mi 65.6 km	45.8898°N 114.2978°W
169	Mount Rogers (Note: The summit of Mount Rogers is the highest point of the United States Commonwealth of Virginia.)	Virginia	Blue Ridge Mountains	5,711 ft 1740.6 m	2,469 ft 753 m	40.6 mi 65.4 km	36.6601°N 81.5449°W
170	Medicine Bow Peak (Note: The summit of Medicine Bow Peak is the highest point of the Snowy Range.)	Wyoming	Medicine Bow Mountains	12,016 ft 3662.4 m	3,243 ft 988 m	40.6 mi 65.4 km	41.3603°N 106.3176°W
171	Mount Miller (Note: The summit of Mount Miller is the highest point of Barkley Ridge.)	Alaska	Chugach Mountains	10,750 ft 3277 m	5,300 ft 1615 m	40.3 mi 64.9 km	60.4605°N 142.3012°W
172	Mount Sanford	Alaska	Wrangell Mountains	16,237 ft 4949 m	7,687 ft 2343 m	40.3 mi 64.8 km	62.2132°N 144.1292°W
173	Troy Peak (Note: The summit of Troy Peak is the highest point of the Grant Range.)	Nevada	Grant Range	11,302 ft 3445 m	4,790 ft 1460 m	40 mi 64.3 km	38.3194°N 115.5019°W
174	Abajo Peak (Note: The summit of Abajo Peak is the highest point of the Abajo Mountains.)	Utah	Abajo Mountains	11,362 ft 3463 m	4,555 ft 1388 m	39.9 mi 64.2 km	37.8395°N 109.4624°W
175	Mount Timpanogos (Note: The summit of Mount Timpanogos is the highest point of the central Wasatch Range.)	Utah	Wasatch Range	11,752 ft 3582 m	5,279 ft 1609 m	39.6 mi 63.8 km	40.3908°N 111.6459°W
176	Summit Peak (Note: The summit of Summit Peak is the highest point of the southern San Juan Mountains.)	Colorado	San Juan Mountains	13,308 ft 4056.2 m	2,760 ft 841 m	39.6 mi 63.7 km	37.3506°N 106.6968°W
177	Willard Peak (Note: The summit of Willard Peak is the highest point of the northern Wasatch Range.)	Utah	Wasatch Range	9,771 ft 2978.1 m	3,263 ft 995 m	39.4 mi 63.5 km	41.3828°N 111.9746°W
178	South Sister	Oregon	Cascade Range	10,363 ft 3158.5 m	5,593 ft 1705 m	39.4 mi 63.4 km	44.1035°N 121.7693°W
179	West Goat Peak (Note: The summit of West Goat Peak is the highest point of the Anaconda Range.) (Note: The elevation of West Goat Peak includes an adjustment of +1.52 m (4.99 ft) from NGVD 29 to NAVD 88.)	Montana	Anaconda Range	10,798 ft 3291 m	3,973 ft 1211 m	39.1 mi 62.9 km	45.9625°N 113.3949°W
180	Mount Wrightson (Note: The summit of Mount Wrightson is the highest point of the Santa Rita Mountains.) (Note: The elevation of Mount Wrightson includes an adjustment of +1.073 m (3.52 ft) from NGVD 29 to NAVD 88.)	Arizona	Santa Rita Mountains	2882 m 9,457 ft	1399 m 4,591 ft	62.5 km 38.8 mi	31.6959°N 110.8482°W
181	Mount Zirkel (Note: The summit of Mount Zirkel is the highest point of the Park Range.) (Note: The elevation of Mount Zirkel includes an adjustment of +1.632 m (5.35 ft) from NGVD 29 to NAVD 88.)	Colorado	Park Range	12,185 ft 3714 m	3,470 ft 1058 m	37.7 mi 60.6 km	40.8313°N 106.6631°W
182	Kichatna Spire	Alaska	Alaska Range	8,985 ft 2739 m	6,235 ft 1900 m	37.3 mi 60 km	62.4231°N 152.7231°W
183	Wheeler Peak (Note: The summit of Wheeler Peak is the highest point of the Taos Mountains and the U.S. State of New Mexico.) (Note: Wheeler Peak is the southernmost 4000-meter (13,123-foot) summit of the Rocky Mountains.)	New Mexico	Taos Mountains	13,167 ft 4013.3 m	3,409 ft 1039 m	37 mi 59.6 km	36.5569°N 105.4169°W
184	Mount Edith (Note: The summit of Mount Edith is the highest point of the Big Belt Mountains.) (Note: The elevation of Mount Edith includes an adjustment of +1.249 m (4.1 ft) from NGVD 29 to NAVD 88.)	Montana	Big Belt Mountains	9,504 ft 2897 m	4,110 ft 1253 m	37 mi 59.5 km	46.4318°N 111.1862°W
185	Thompson Peak (Note: The summit of Thompson Peak is the highest point of the Salmon Mountains.)	California	Klamath Mountains	8,999 ft 2743 m	3,934 ft 1199 m	37 mi 59.5 km	41.0006°N 123.0484°W
186	Pagan Island high point	Northern Mariana Islands	Mariana Islands (Pagan Island)	1,870 ft 570 m	1,870 ft 570 m	36.89 mi 59.37 km	18.1390°N 145.7869°E
187	South Tent Mountain (Note: The summit of South Tent Mountain is the highest point of the Wasatch Plateau.)	Utah	Wasatch Plateau	11,288 ft 3440.5 m	3,385 ft 1032 m	35.8 mi 57.5 km	39.3922°N 111.3576°W
188	Kootznoowoo Peak (Note: The summit of Kootznoowoo Peak is the highest point of Admiralty Island.)	Alaska	Admiralty Island	1478 m 4,850 ft	1478 m 4,850 ft	57.5 km 35.7 mi	57.7891°N 134.4546°W
189	Homer Youngs Peak (Note: The summit of Homer Youngs Peak is the highest point of the West Big Hole Mountains.) (Note: The elevation of Homer Youngs Peak includes an adjustment of +1.483 m (4.87 ft) from NGVD 29 to NAVD 88.)	Montana	Bitterroot Range	10,626 ft 3239 m	3,201 ft 976 m	35.5 mi 57.2 km	45.3111°N 113.6773°W
190	Mount Tobin (Note: The summit of Mount Tobin is the highest point of the Tobin Range.)	Nevada	Tobin Range	9,778 ft 2980.4 m	4,851 ft 1479 m	35.4 mi 57 km	40.3765°N 117.5261°W
191	Culebra Peak (Note: The summit of Culebra Peak is the highest point of the Culebra Range.) (Note: Culebra Peak is the southernmost 14,000-foot (4267-meter) summit of the Rocky Mountains.) (Note: The elevation of Culebra Peak includes an adjustment of +1.74 m (5.71 ft) from NGVD 29 to NAVD 88.)	Colorado	Culebra Range	14,053 ft 4283 m	4,827 ft 1471 m	35.4 mi 56.9 km	37.1224°N 105.1858°W
192	Frosty Peak	Alaska	Aleutian Range	5,803 ft 1769 m	5,753 ft 1754 m	35.4 mi 56.9 km	55.0672°N 162.8351°W
193	Chicoma Mountain (Note: The summit of Chicoma Mountain is the highest point of the Jemez Mountains.)	New Mexico	Jemez Mountains	11,561 ft 3523.8 m	4,291 ft 1308 m	35.3 mi 56.8 km	36.0073°N 106.3846°W
194	Wind River Peak (Note: The summit of Wind River Peak is the highest point of the southern Wind River Range.)	Wyoming	Wind River Range	13,197 ft 4022.4 m	2,572 ft 784 m	35.1 mi 56.6 km	42.7085°N 109.1284°W
195	Augustine Volcano (Note: The summit of Augustine Volcano is the highest point of Augustine Island.)	Alaska	Augustine Island	1227 m 4,025 ft	1227 m 4,025 ft	56.3 km 35 mi	59.3622°N 153.4330°W
196	Ute Peak (Note: The summit of Ute Peak is the highest point of Ute Mountain.)	Colorado	Ute Mountain	9,984 ft 3043 m	4,039 ft 1231 m	34.3 mi 55.2 km	37.2841°N 108.7787°W
197	Hollowtop Mountain (Note: The summit of Hollowtop Mountain is the highest point of the Tobacco Root Mountains.) (Note: The elevation of Hollowtop Mountain includes an adjustment of +1.486 m (4.88 ft) from NGVD 29 to NAVD 88.)	Montana	Tobacco Root Mountains	10,609 ft 3234 m	3,904 ft 1190 m	34 mi 54.8 km	45.6116°N 112.0083°W
198	Mount Tipton (Note: The summit of Mount Tipton is the highest point of the Cerbat Mountains.)	Arizona	Cerbat Mountains	7,153 ft 2180.2 m	3,638 ft 1109 m	33.8 mi 54.5 km	35.5389°N 114.1927°W
199	Thirst Benchmark (Note: The summit of Thirst Benchmark is the highest point of San Clemente Island.)	California	San Clemente Island	1,969 ft 600 m	1,969 ft 600 m	33.8 mi 54.4 km	32.8836°N 118.4508°W
200	Hayford Peak (Note: The summit of Hayford Peak is the highest point of the Sheep Range.)	Nevada	Sheep Range	9,924 ft 3024.9 m	5,412 ft 1650 m	33.8 mi 54.3 km	36.6577°N 115.2008°W
201	Apple Orchard Mountain (Note: The summit of Apple Orchard Mountain is the highest point of the northern Blue Ridge Mountains.)	Virginia	Blue Ridge Mountains	4,222 ft 1286.91 m	2,835 ft 864 m	33.7 mi 54.2 km	37.5174°N 79.5098°W
202	Iliamna Volcano (Note: Iliamna Volcano is the westernmost 3000-meter (9843-foot) summit of Alaska and greater North America.)	Alaska	Chigmit Mountains	10,016 ft 3053 m	7,866 ft 2398 m	33.6 mi 54.1 km	60.0321°N 153.0915°W
202	Santiago Peak (Note: The summit of Santiago Peak is the highest point of the Santa Ana Mountains.)	California	Santa Ana Mountains	5,690 ft 1734.36 m	4,397 ft 1340 m	33.6 mi 54.1 km	33.7105°N 117.5342°W
204	Tamgas Mountain (Note: The summit of Tamgas Mountain is the highest point of Annette Island.)	Alaska	Annette Island	1095 m 3,591 ft	1095 m 3,591 ft	53.6 km 33.3 mi	55.0660°N 131.4077°W
205	Mount Wilson (Note: The summit of Mount Wilson is the highest point of the San Miguel Mountains.) (Note: Mount Wilson is the westernmost summit of its elevation in the Rocky Mountains.) (Note: The elevation of Mount Wilson includes an adjustment of +1.899 m (6.23 ft) from NGVD 29 to NAVD 88.)	Colorado	San Miguel Mountains	14,252 ft 4344 m	4,024 ft 1227 m	33 mi 53.1 km	37.8391°N 107.9916°W
206	Crow Peak (Note: The summit of Crow Peak is the highest point of the Elkhorn Mountains.) (Note: The elevation of Crow Peak includes an adjustment of +1.353 m (4.44 ft) from NGVD 29 to NAVD 88.)	Montana	Elkhorn Mountains	9,418 ft 2871 m	3,805 ft 1160 m	32.9 mi 53 km	46.2940°N 111.9037°W
207	Mount Diablo	California	Diablo Range	3,864 ft 1177.7 m	3,119 ft 951 m	32.8 mi 52.8 km	37.8817°N 121.9142°W
208	Isthmus Peak	Alaska	Kenai Mountains	6,532 ft 1991 m	5,782 ft 1762 m	32.3 mi 52 km	60.5772°N 148.8915°W
209	North Palisade (Note: The summit of North Palisade is the highest point of the Palisades.) (Note: The elevation of North Palisade includes an adjustment of +1.867 m (6.13 ft) from NGVD 29 to NAVD 88.)	California	Sierra Nevada	14,248 ft 4343 m	2,894 ft 882 m	32.2 mi 51.8 km	37.0943°N 118.5145°W

== Gallery ==
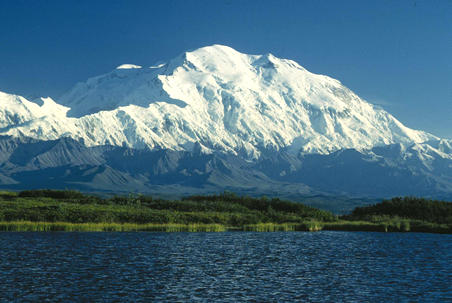
1. Denali in Alaska is the highest summit of the United States and all of North America.

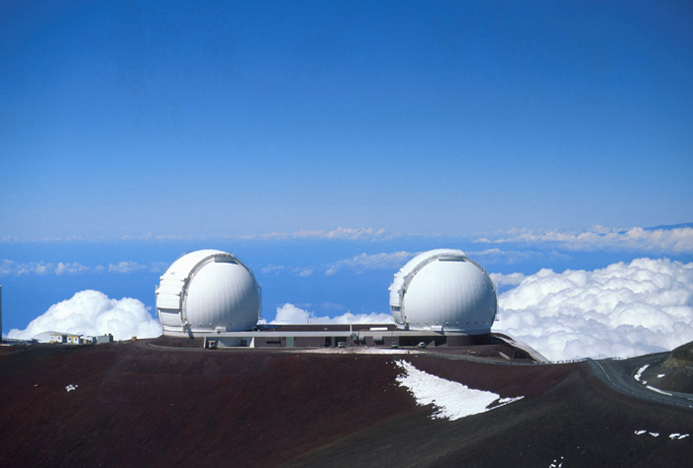
2. Mauna Kea on the Island of Hawaiʻi is the tallest mountain on Earth as measured from base to summit.

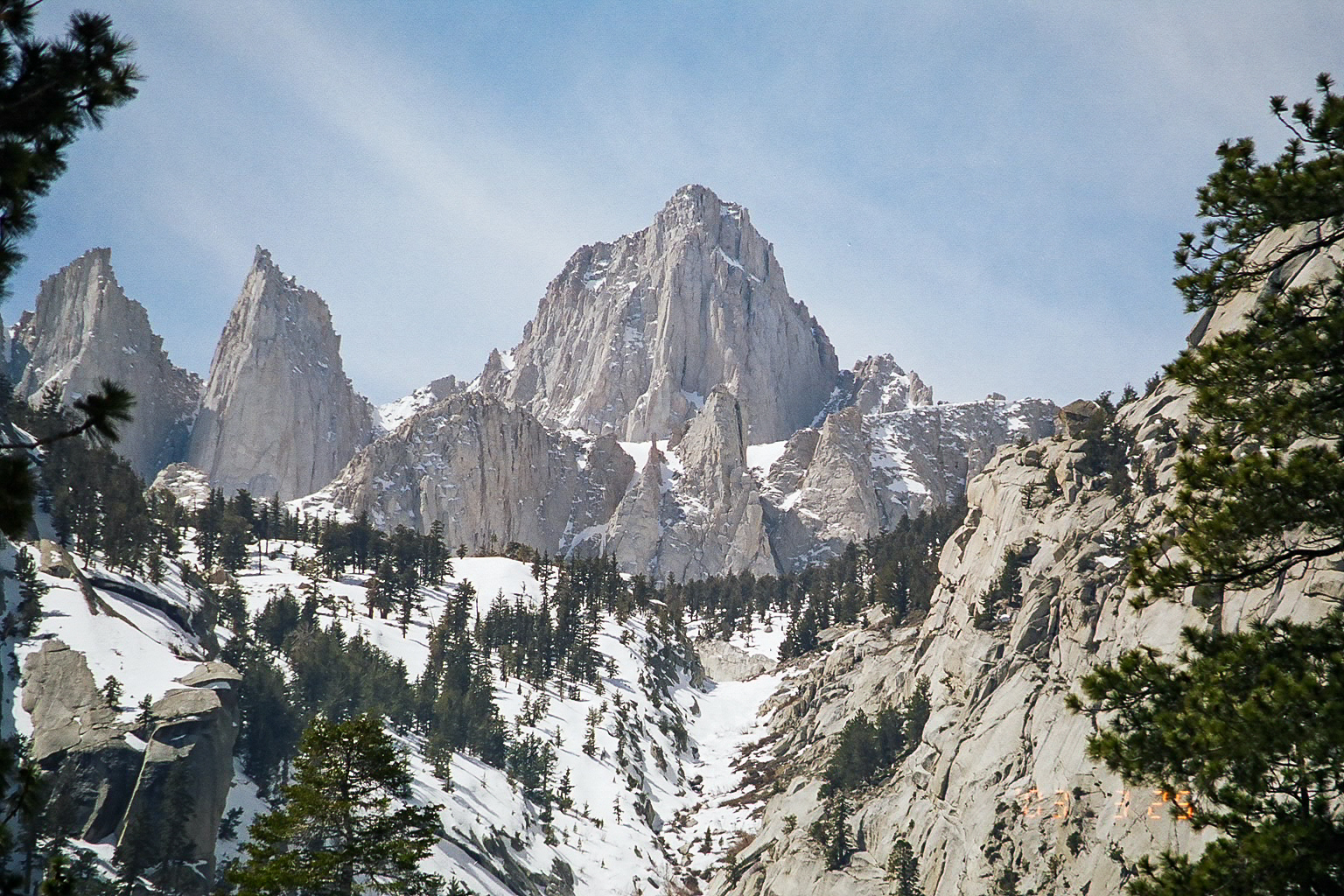
3. Mount Whitney highest summit of the Sierra Nevada and California.

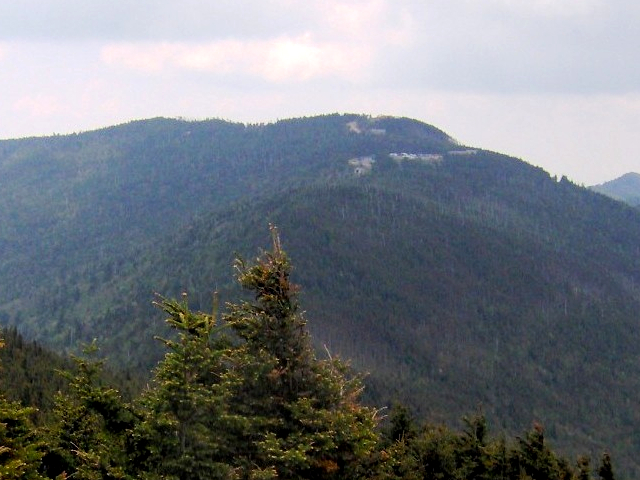
4. Mount Mitchell is the highest summit of North Carolina and the Appalachian Mountains.

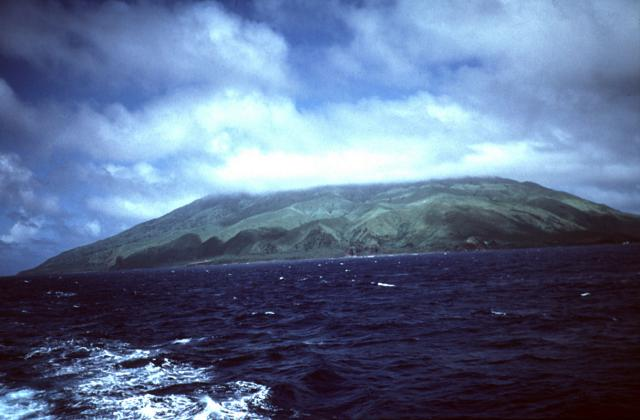
5. The summit of the Island of Agrihan is the highest summit in the Northern Mariana Islands and the Mariana Islands archipelago.

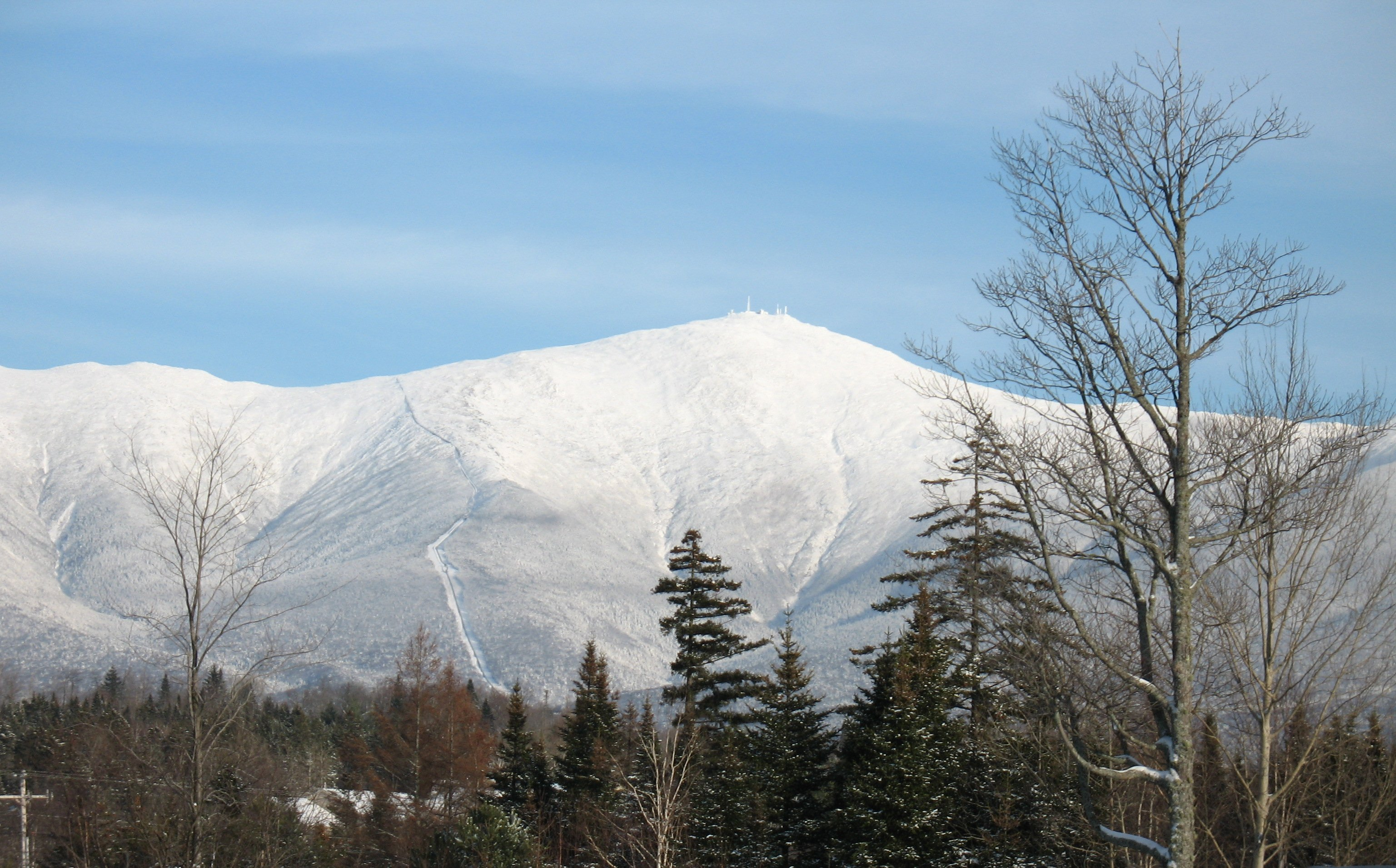
6. Mount Washington is the highest summit of the White Mountains and New Hampshire.

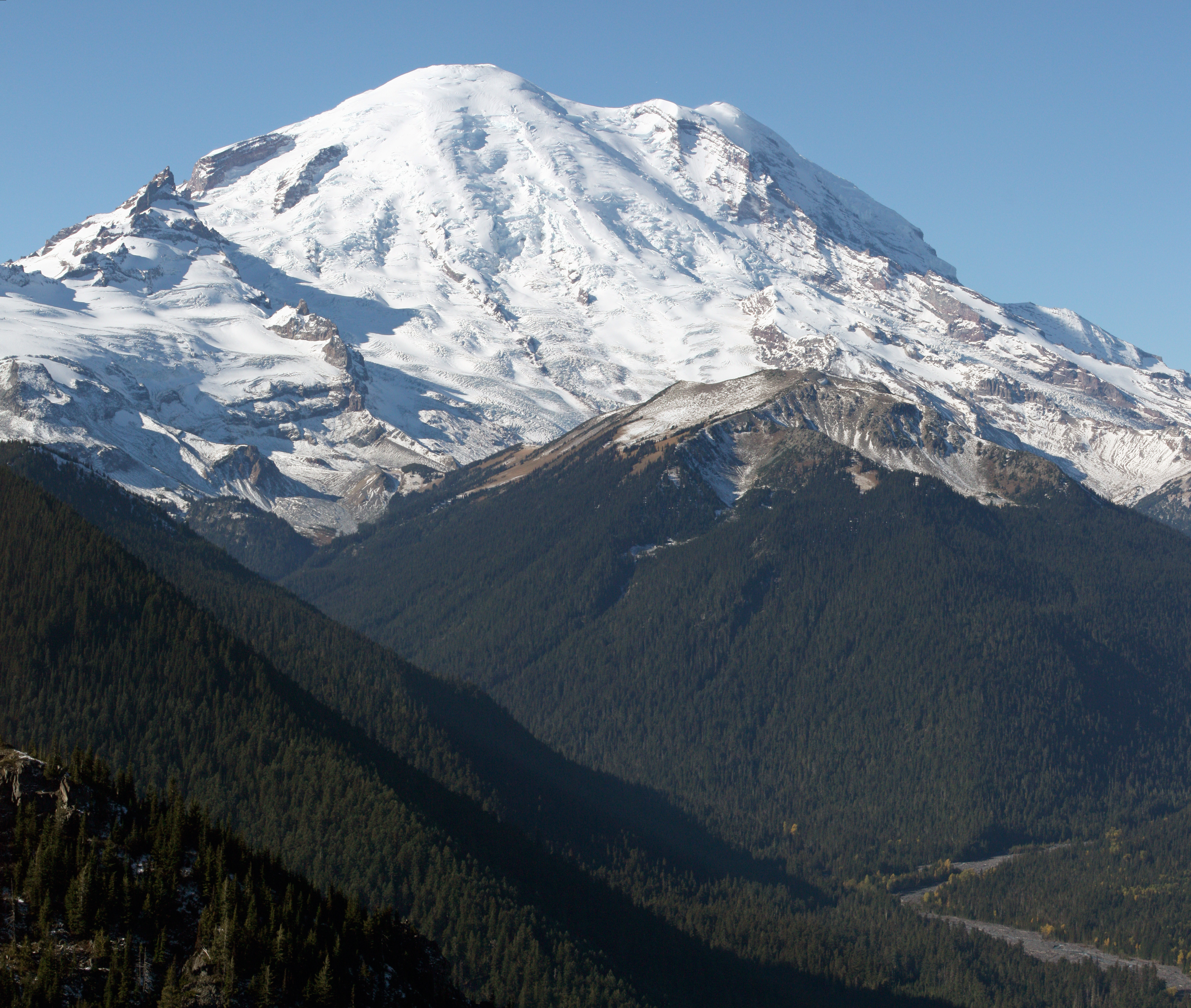
7. Mount Rainier is the highest summit of Washington and the Cascade Range.

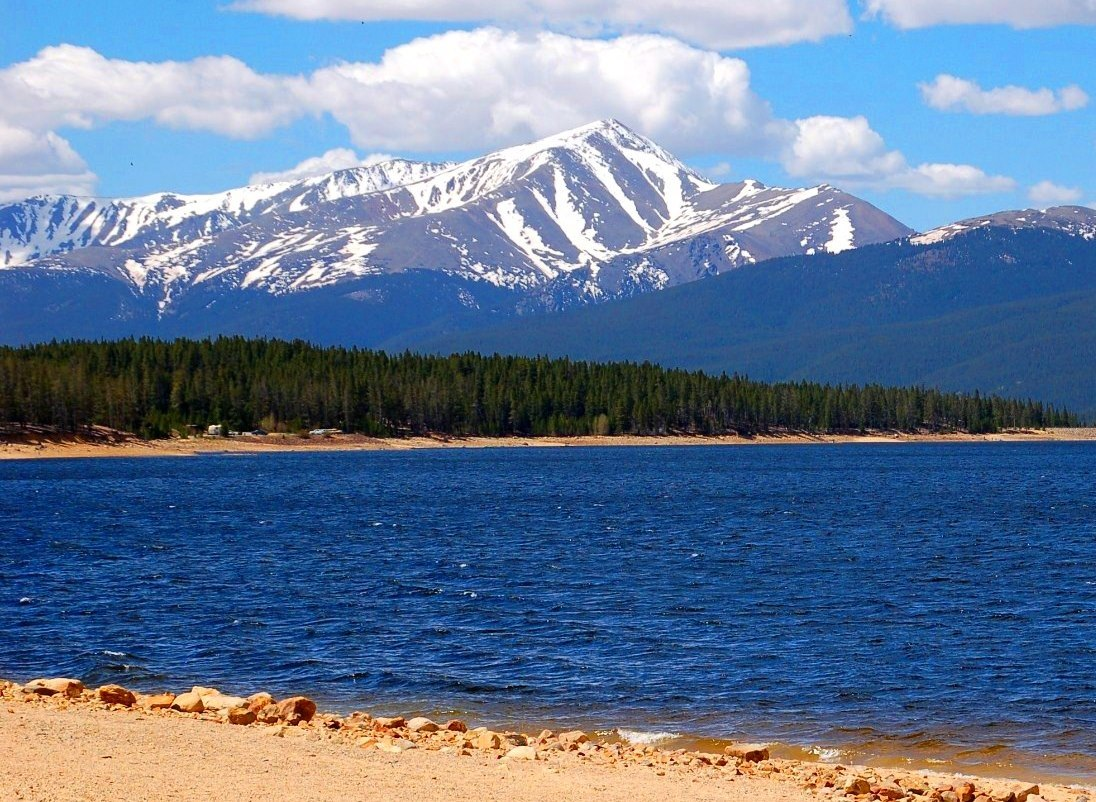
8. Mount Elbert is the highest summit of Colorado and the Rocky Mountains.

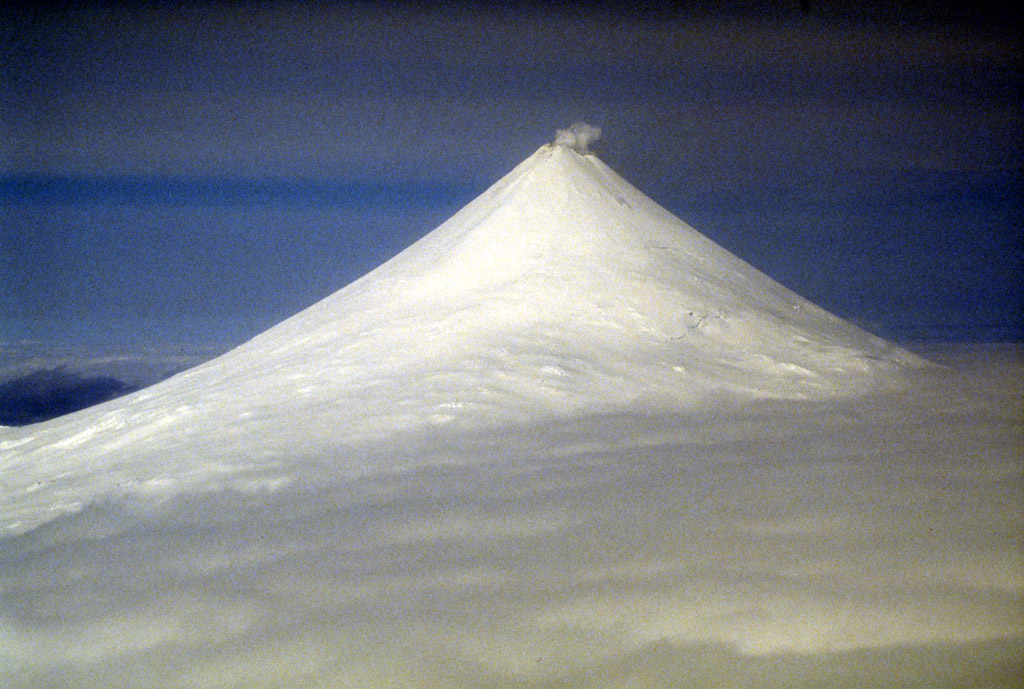
9. Mount Shishaldin on Unimak Island in Alaska is the highest summit of the Aleutian Islands.

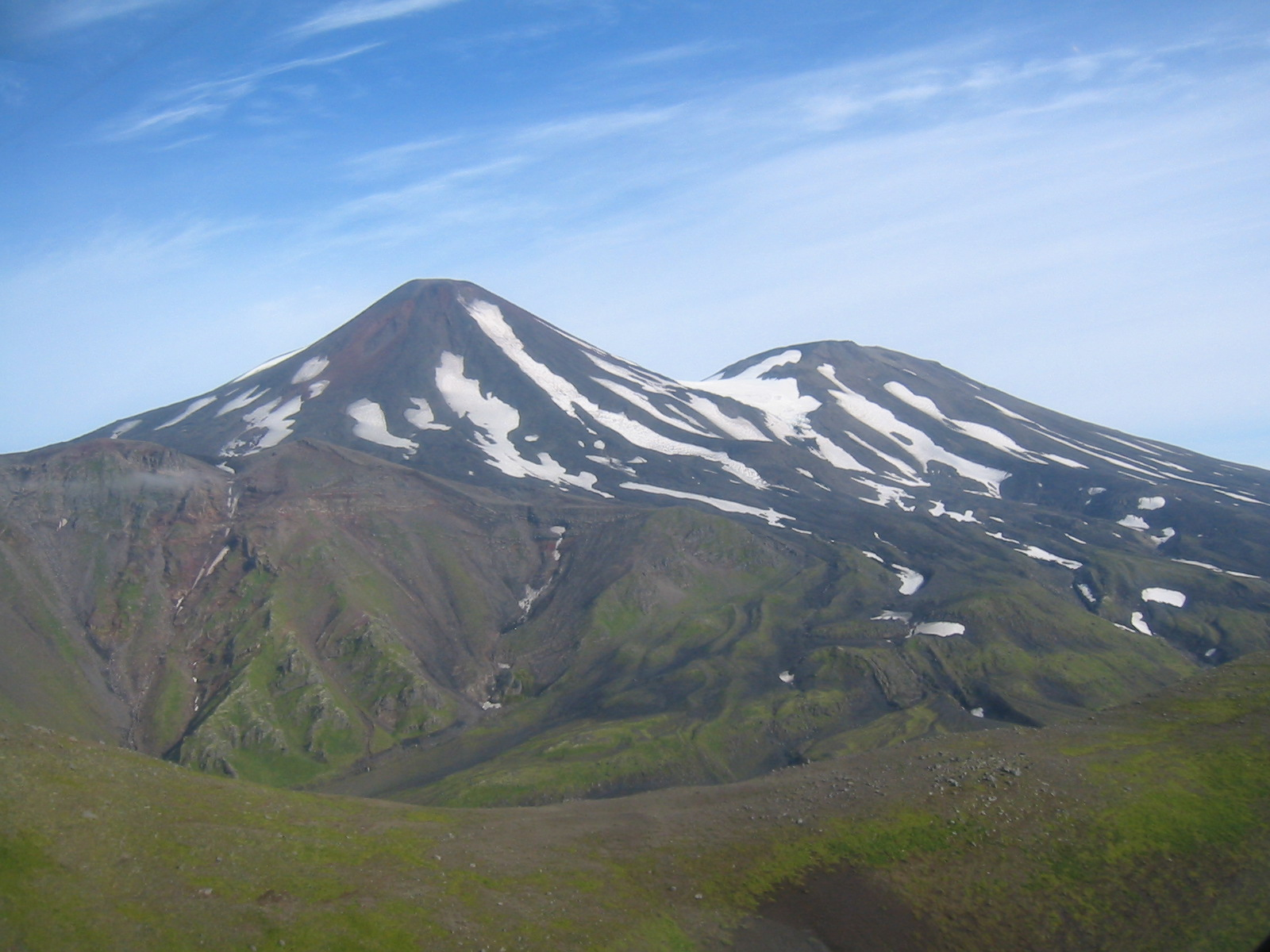
10. Tanaga Volcano is the highest summit of Tanaga Island in the Aleutian Islands.

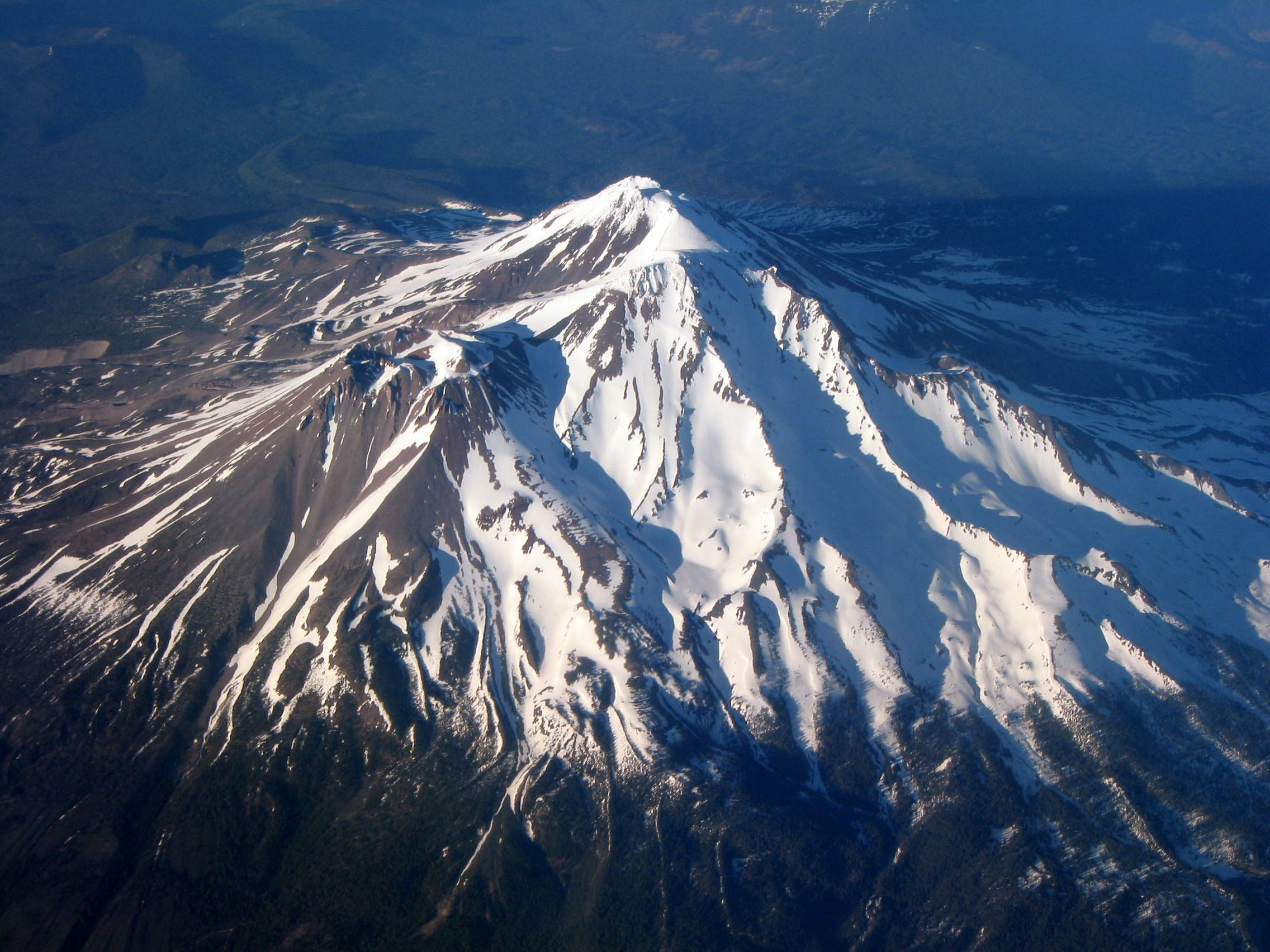
13. Mount Shasta in California is the highest summit of the southern Cascade Range.

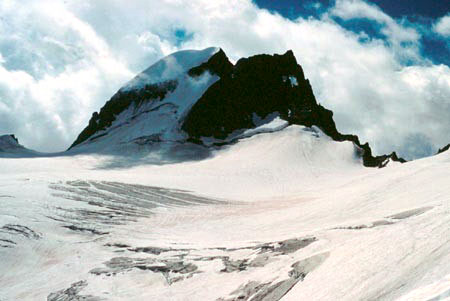
14. Gannett Peak is the highest summit of the Wind River Range and Wyoming.

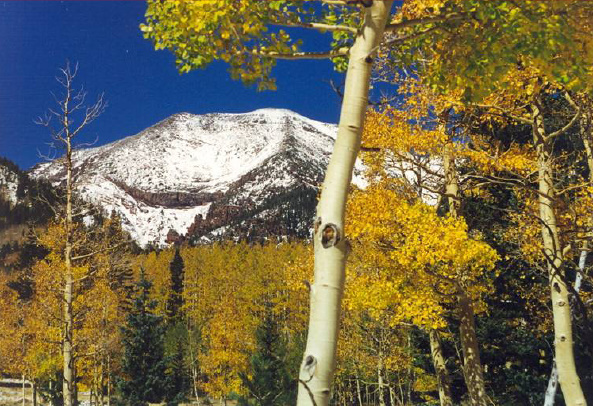
17. Humphreys Peak is the highest summit of the San Francisco Peaks and Arizona.

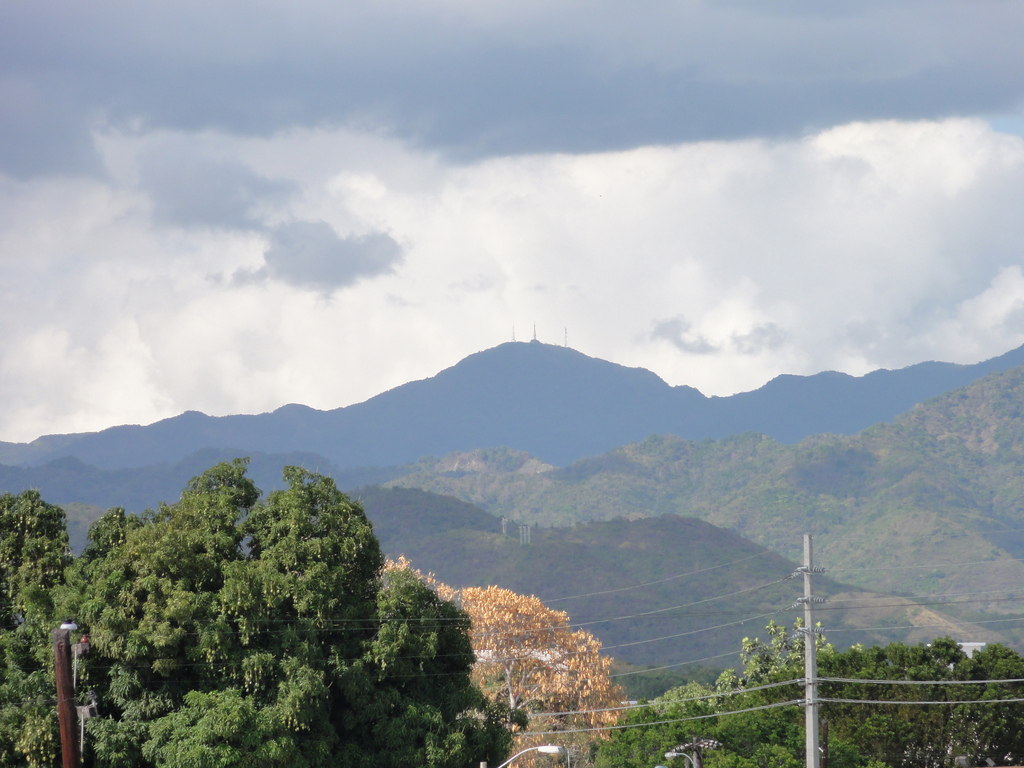
18. Cerro de Punta is the highest summit of Puerto Rico, and the highest summit of the United States located outside the 50 states.

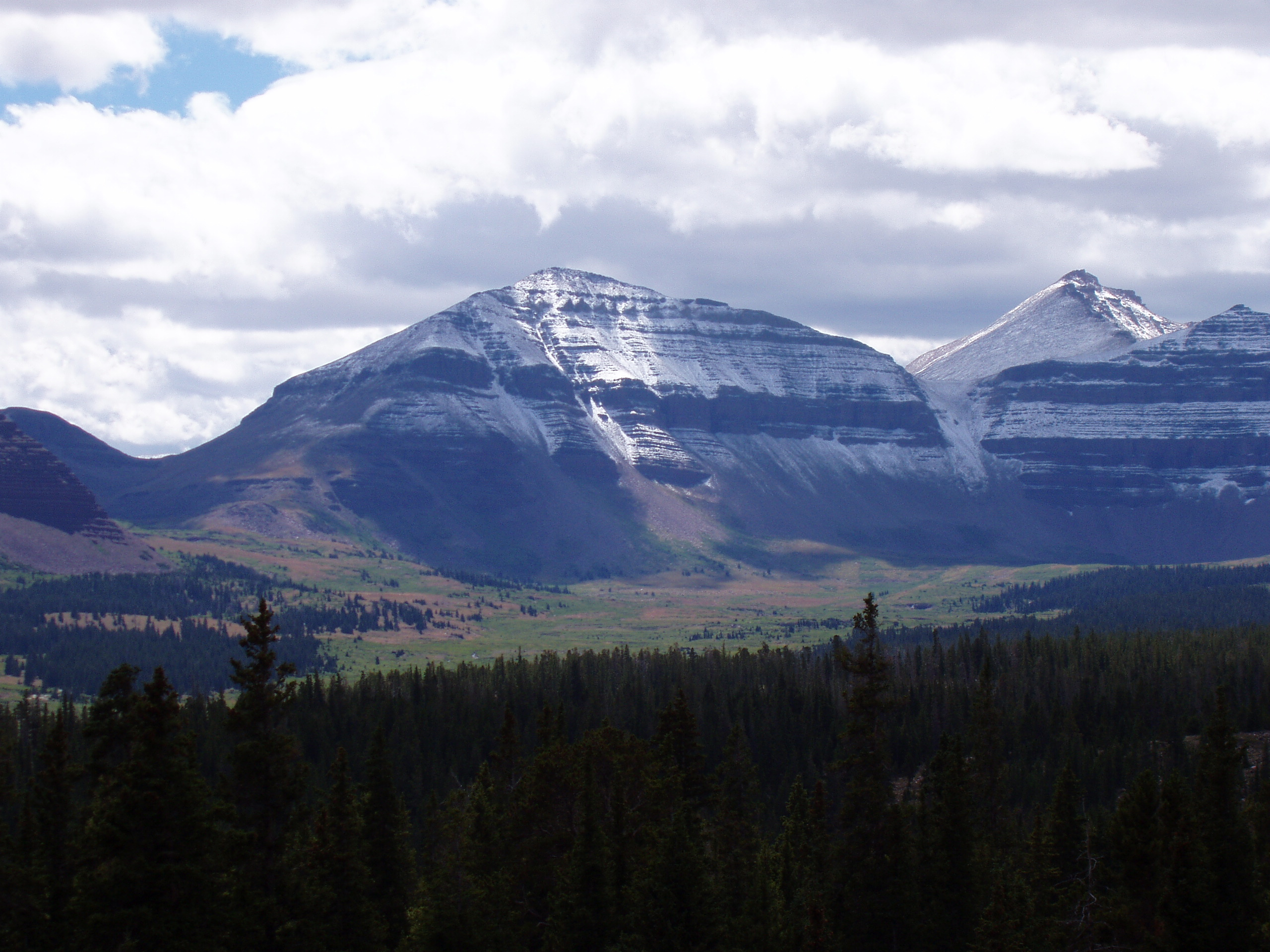
26. Kings Peak is the highest summit of the Uinta Range and Utah.

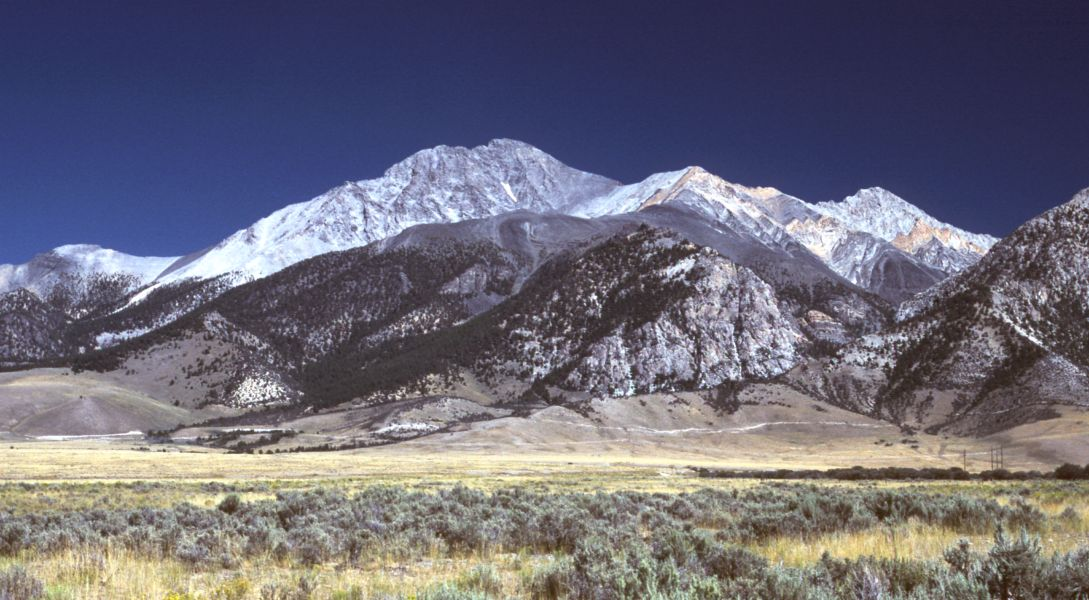
33. Borah Peak is the highest summit of the Lost River Range and Idaho.

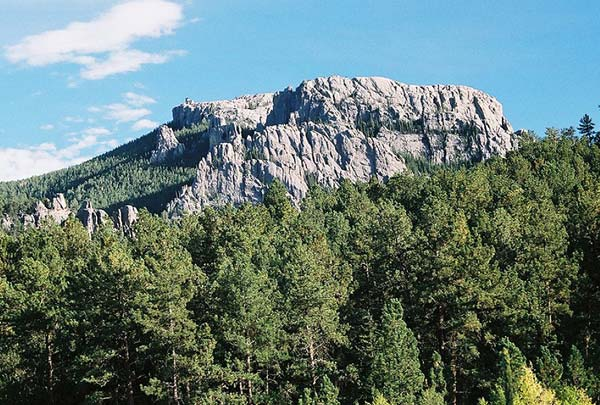
36. Black Elk Peak is the highest summit of the Black Hills and South Dakota.

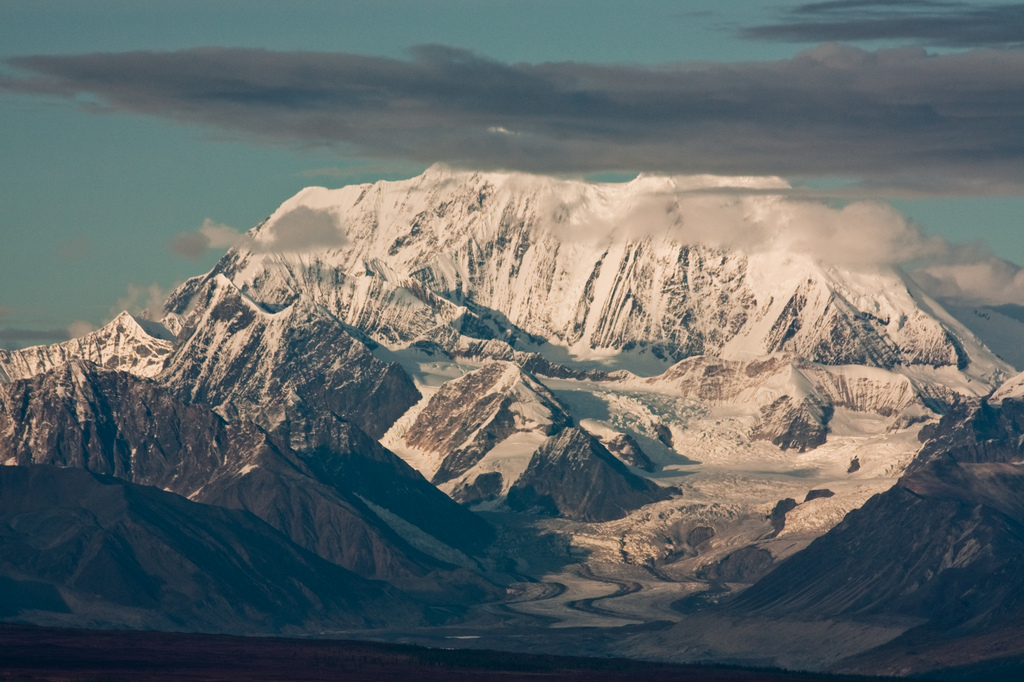
44. Mount Hayes is the highest summit of the eastern Alaska Range.

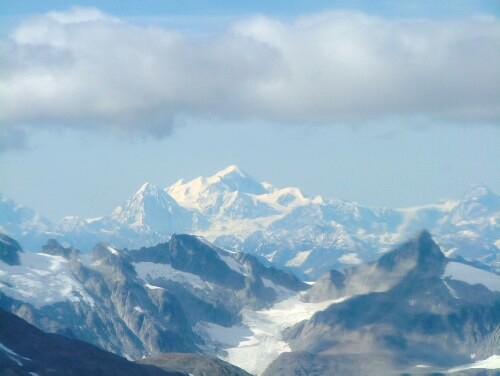
47. Mount Fairweather lies on the Alaska-British Columbia international border.

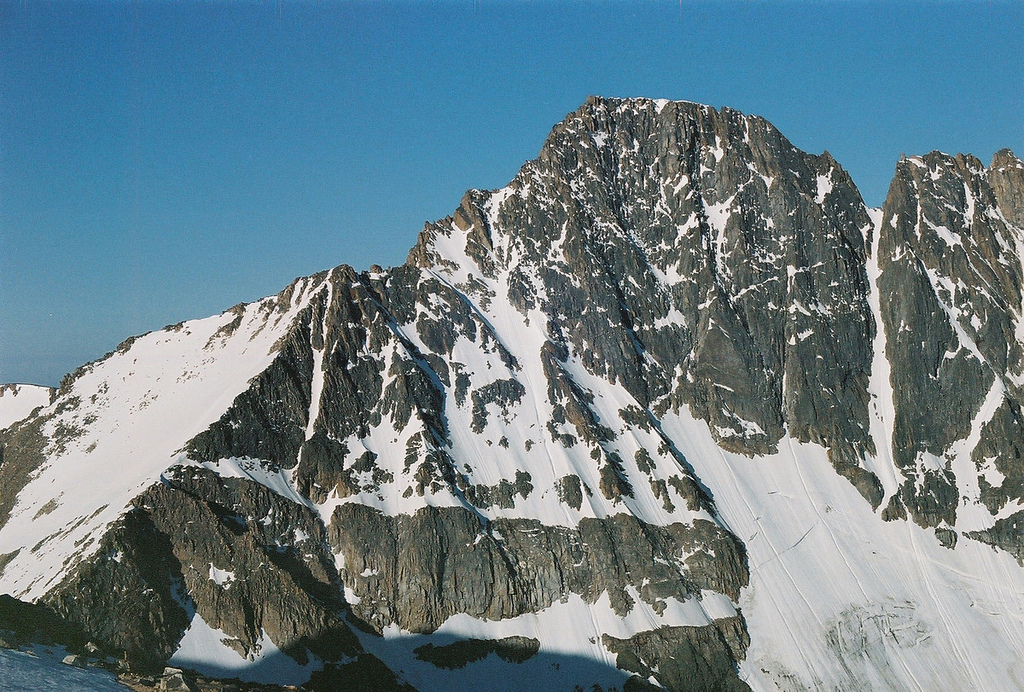
68. Granite Peak is the highest summit of the Beartooth Range and Montana.

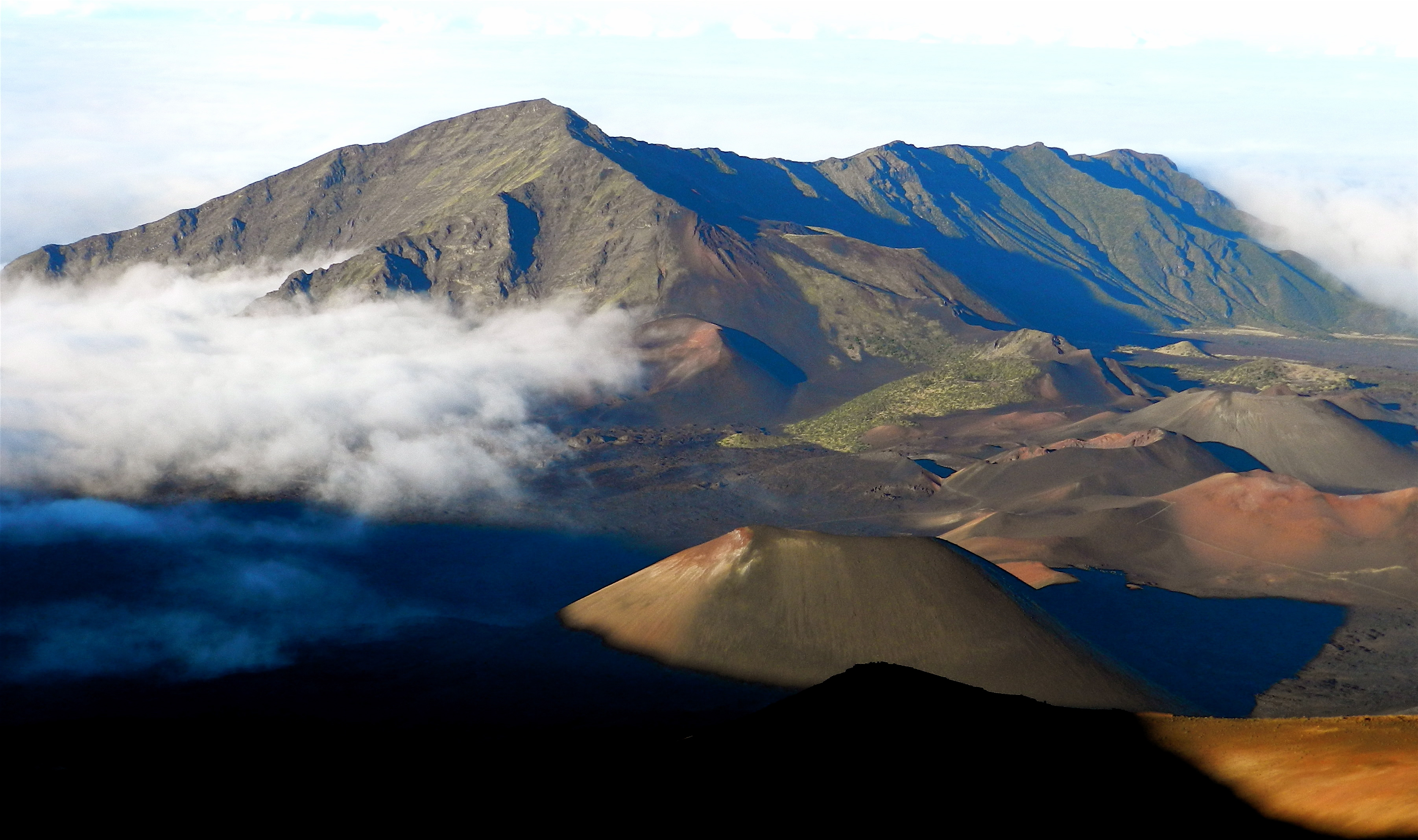
86. Haleakalā is the highest summit of the Island of Maui.

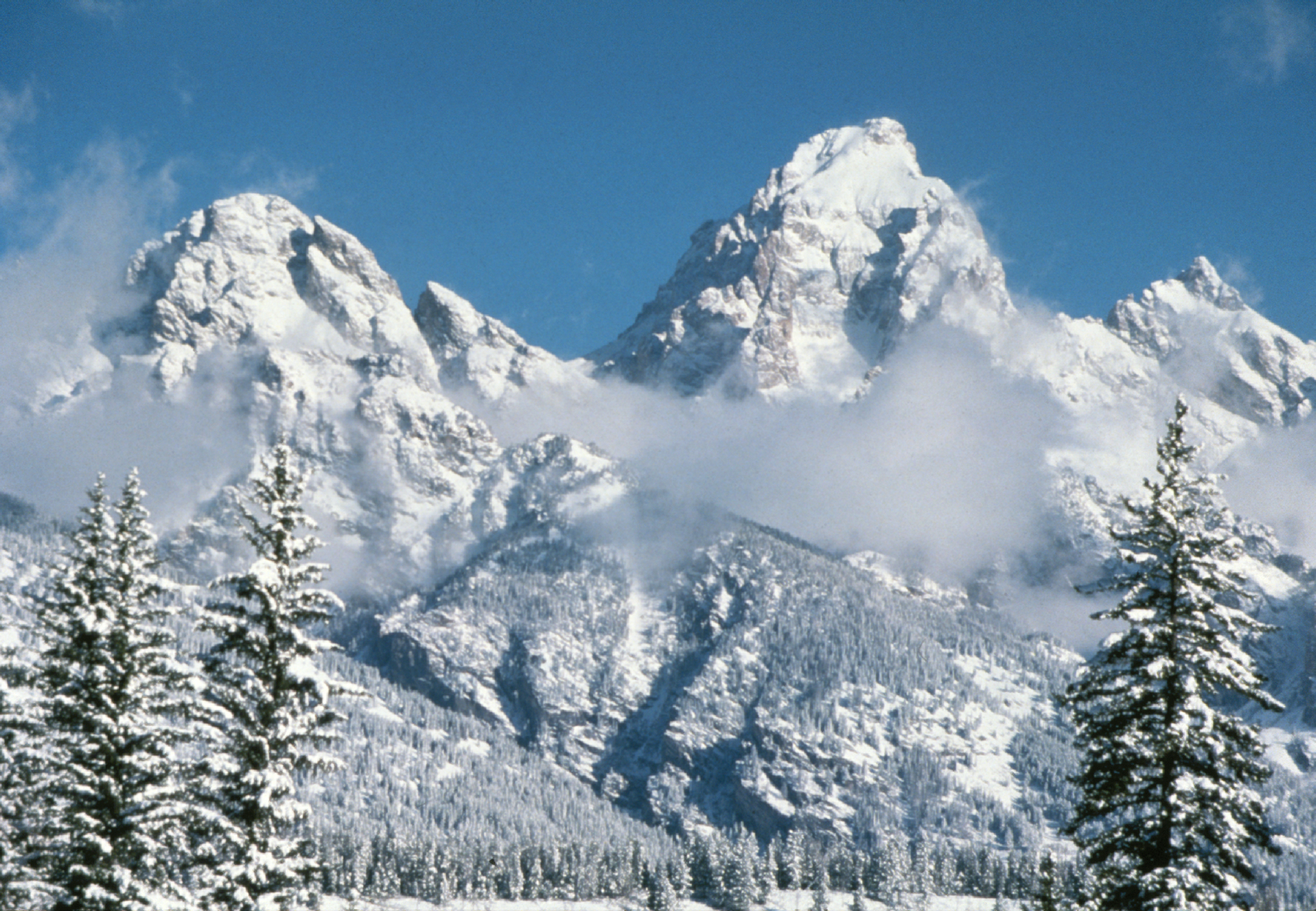
99. Grand Teton in Wyoming is the highest summit of the Teton Range.

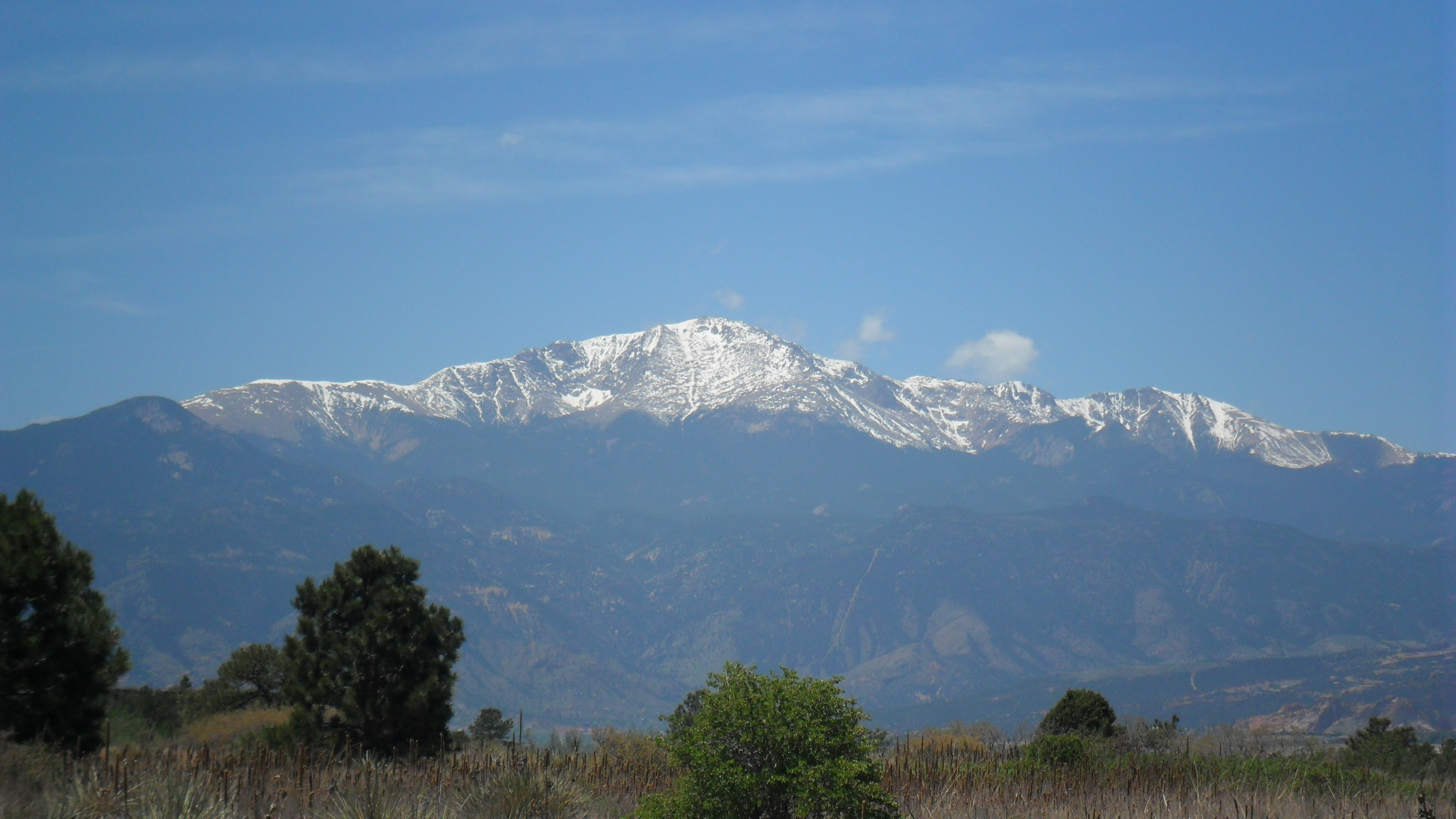
121. Pikes Peak in Colorado was the inspiration for America the Beautiful.

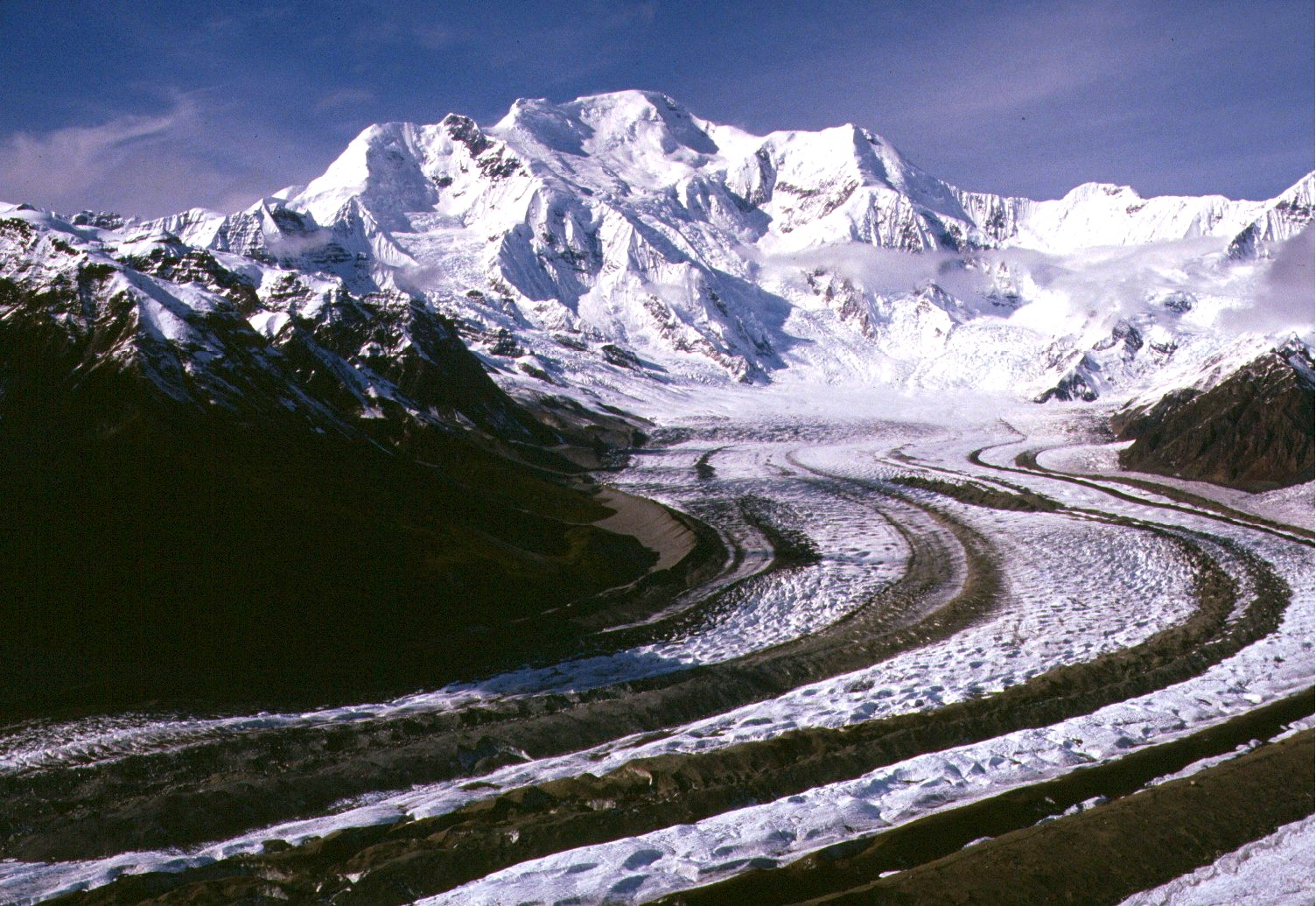
116. Mount Blackburn in Alaska is the highest summit of the Wrangell Mountains.

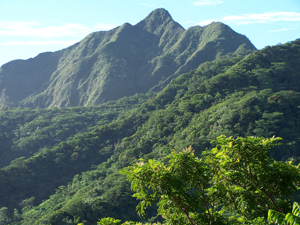
122. Matafao Peak in American Samoa is the highest summit of the island of Tutuila (the main island of American Samoa).

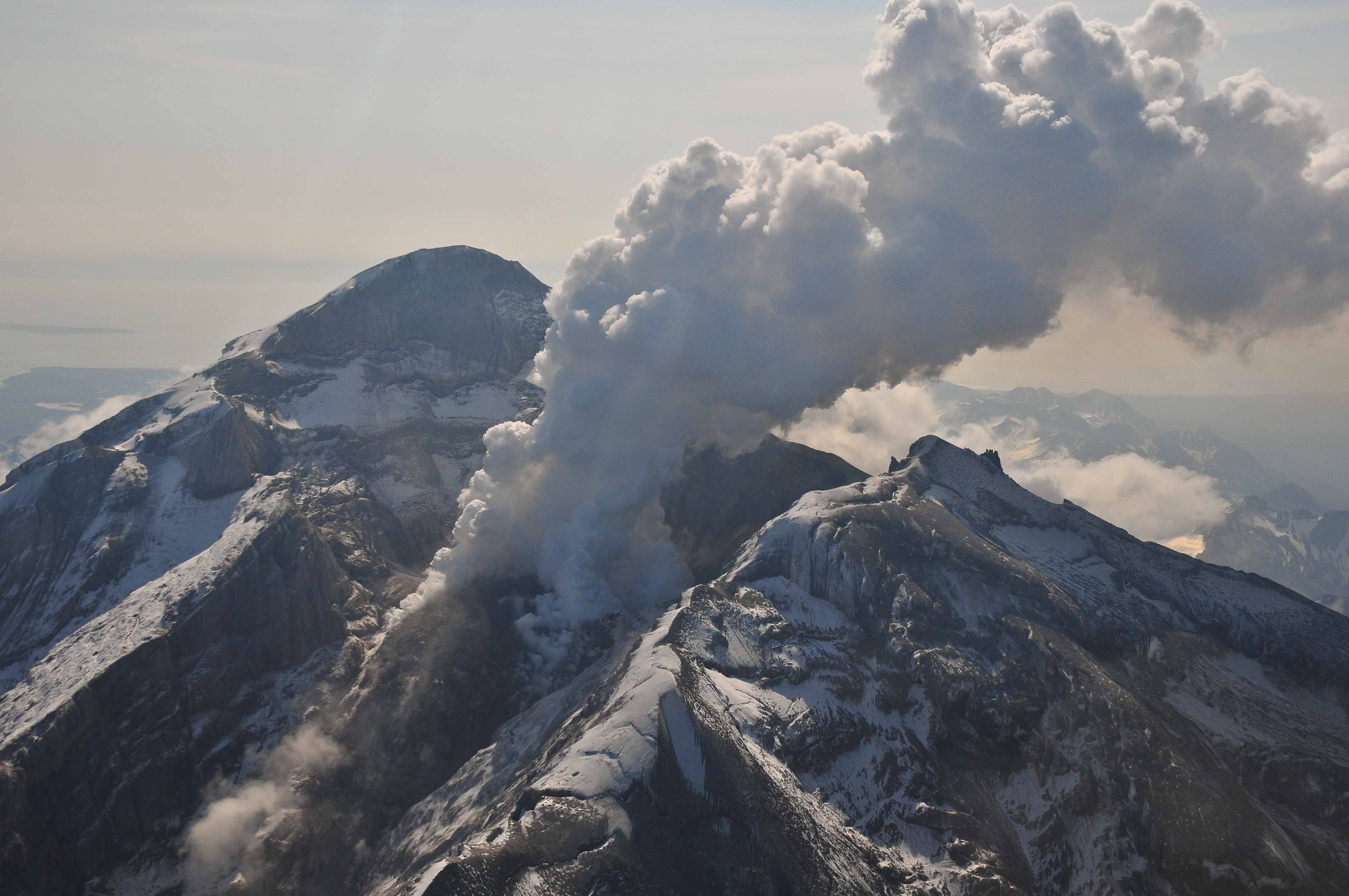
125. Redoubt Volcano is the highest summit of the Aleutian Range.

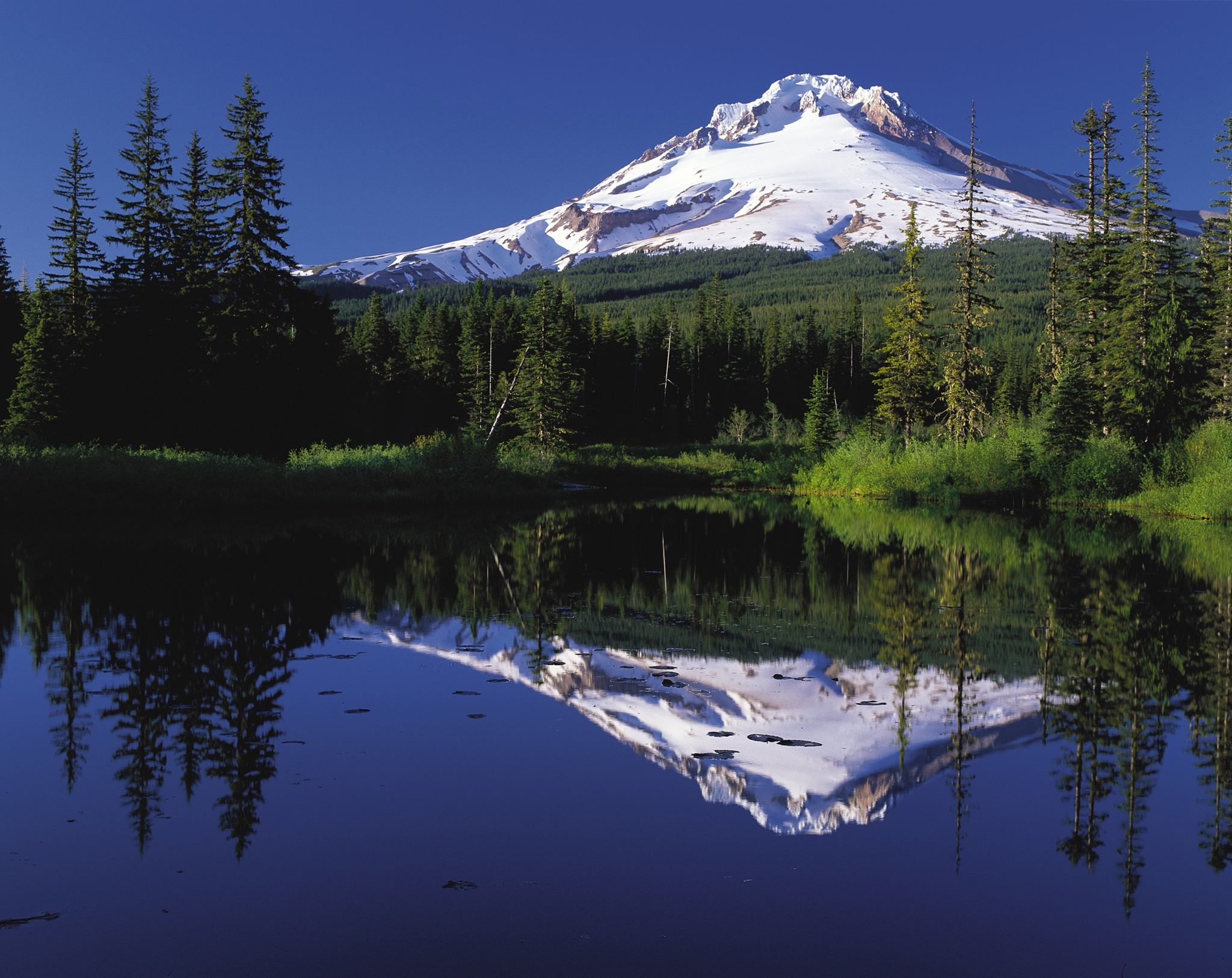
129. Mount Hood is the highest summit of Oregon.

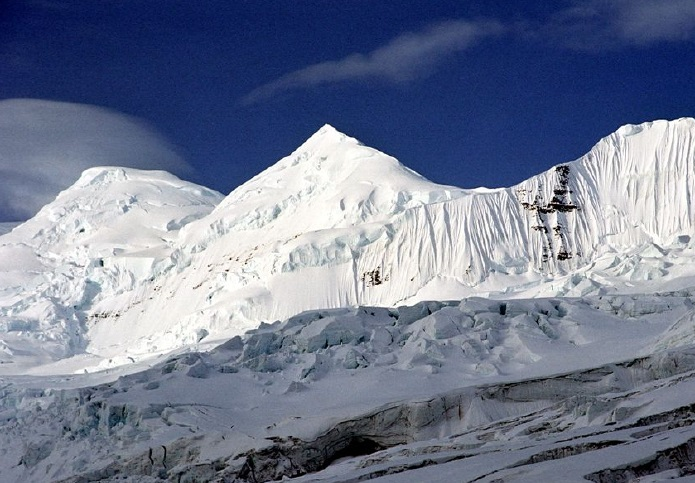
144. Mount Bona in Alaska is the highest volcano in the United States.

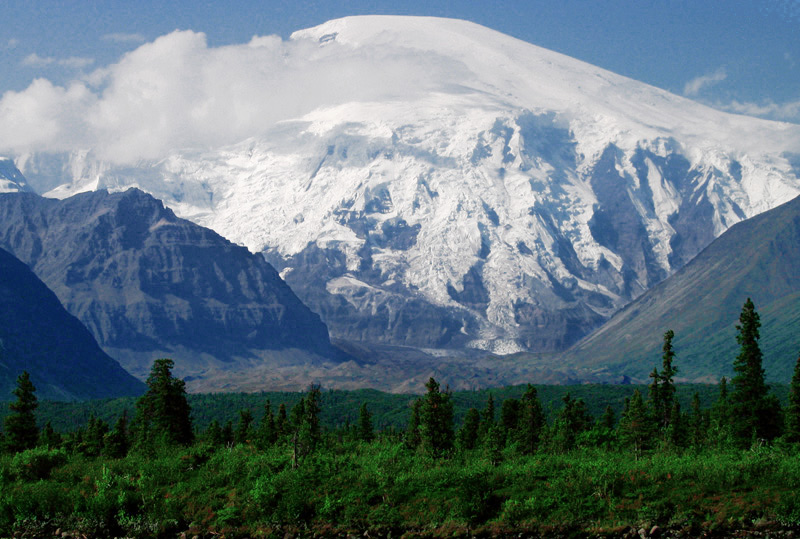
164. Mount Sanford in Alaska is the third highest volcano in the United States.

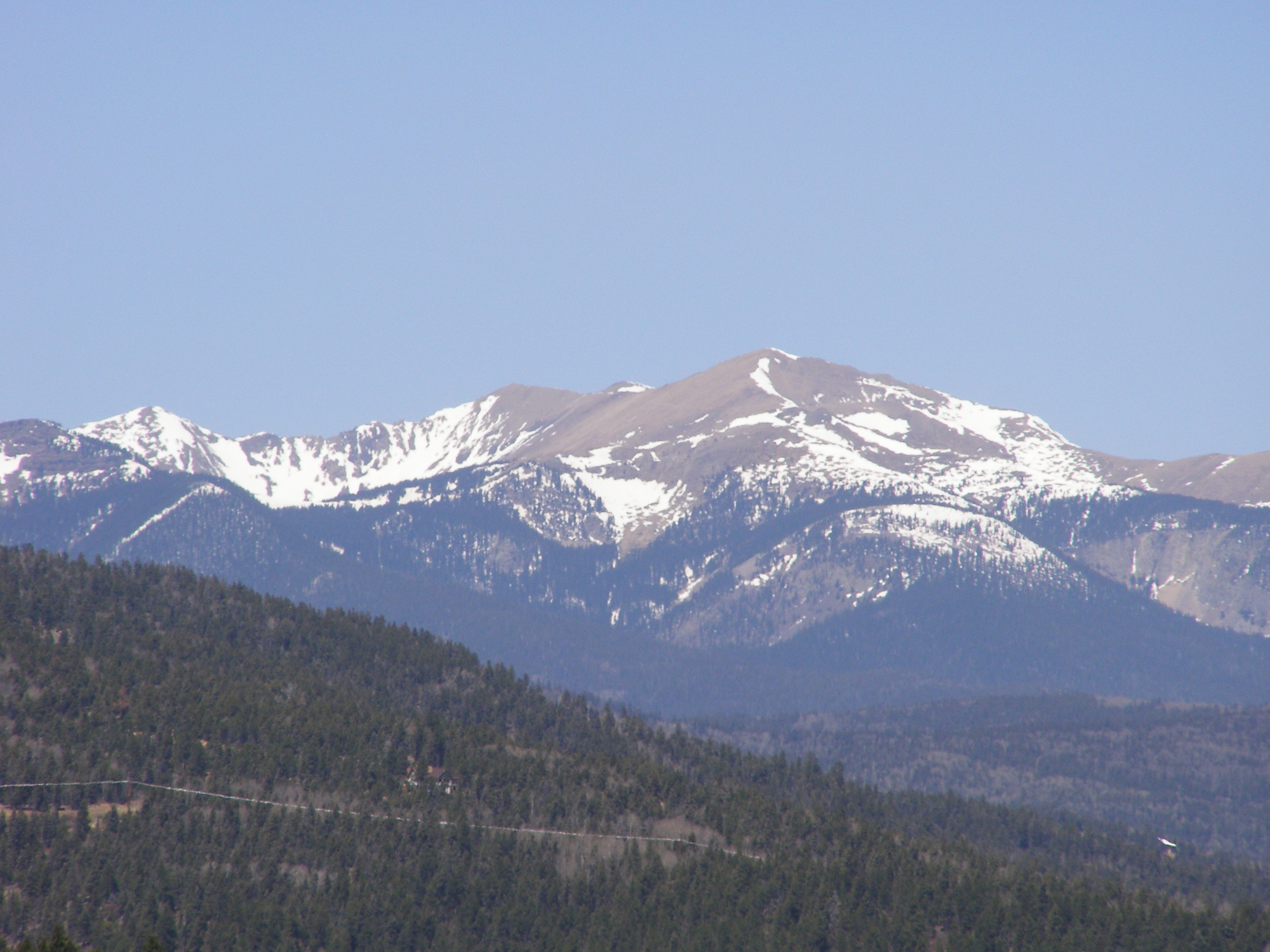
183. Wheeler Peak is the highest summit of New Mexico.

== See also ==
- List of mountain peaks of North America
  - List of mountain peaks of Greenland
  - List of mountain peaks of Canada
  - List of mountain peaks of the Rocky Mountains
  - List of mountain peaks of the United States
    - List of the highest major summits of the United States
      - List of the major 4000-meter summits of the United States
      - List of the major 3000-meter summits of the United States
      - List of United States fourteeners
    - List of the most prominent summits of the United States
      - List of the ultra-prominent summits of the United States
    - List of the most isolated major summits of the United States
      - List of the major 100-kilometer summits of the United States
    - List of mountain peaks of Alaska
    - List of mountain peaks of California
    - List of mountain peaks of Colorado
    - List of mountain peaks of Hawaiʻi
  - List of mountain peaks of México
  - List of mountain peaks of Central America
  - List of mountain peaks of the Caribbean
- United States of America
  - Geography of the United States
  - Geology of the United States
    - Category:Mountains of the United States
      - commons:Category:Mountains of the United States
- Physical geography
  - Topography
    - Topographic elevation
    - Topographic prominence
    - Topographic isolation
