= Mount Livermore (Texas) =

Mountain in Texas, United States

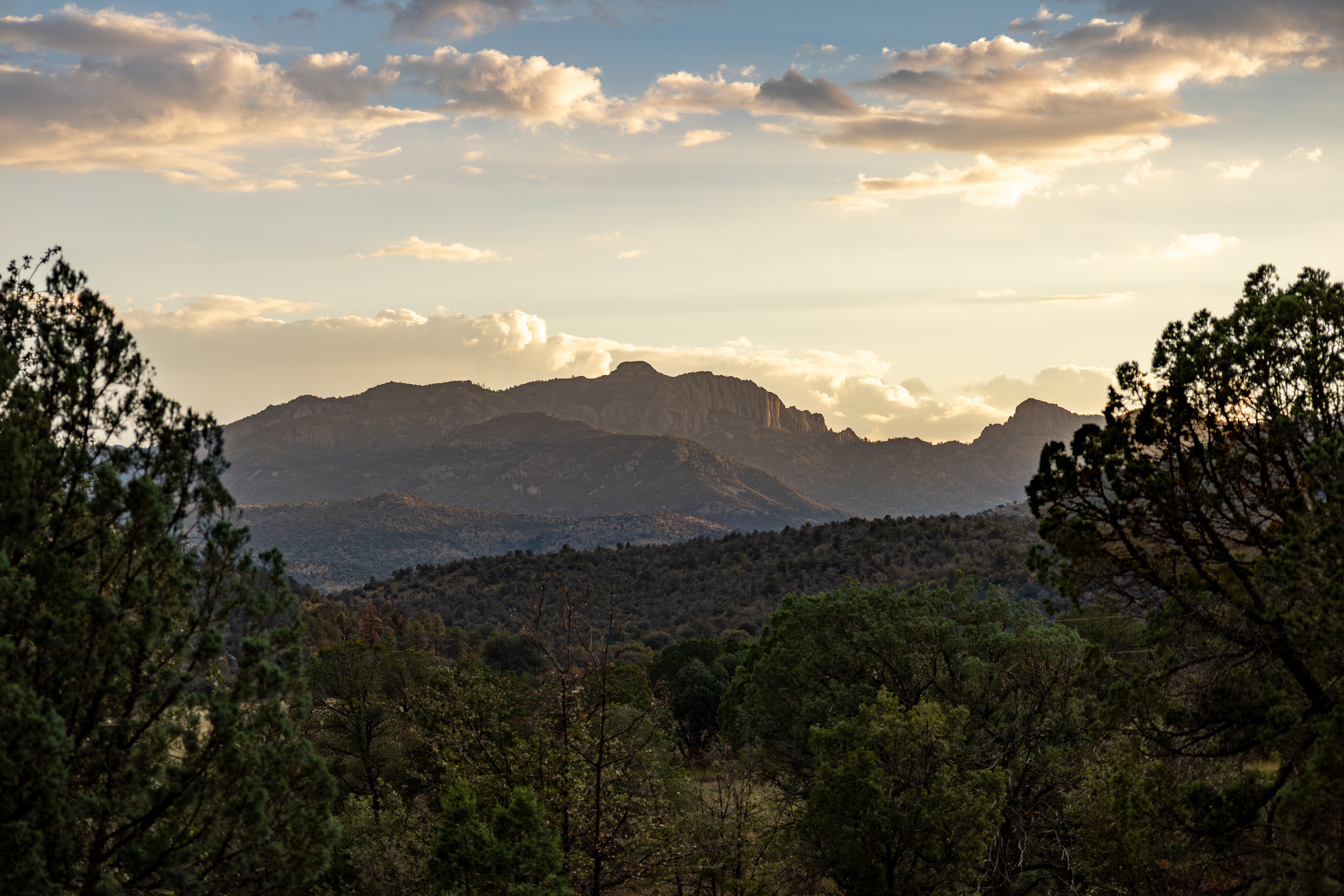
- Mount Livermore seen at dusk from the Nature Conservancy's Davis Mountains Preserve

Highest point
- Elevation: 8,378 ft (2,554 m)
- Prominence: 3,918 ft (1,194 m)
- Coordinates: 30°38′00″N 104°10′03″W

Geography
- Location within Texas
- Location: Jeff Davis County, Texas, U.S.

Mount Livermore is a summit in the Davis Mountains in Jeff Davis County, Texas. It reaches an elevation of 8,378 feet / 2,554 meters, and is the fourth highest and most isolated peak in Texas. The peak was named for Major William Livermore who used it as a point of observations and placed a base monument atop it.

In October and November 1884, Major Livermore, of the Engineer Corps, was in charge of a military expedition in making a map of western Texas. When reaching the top of the bare rock he called it "Old Baldy", named after a general officer called Baldy Smith. Baldy Peak is an alternate name.

== The Livermore Cache ==
An extensive cache of arrow points and fragments was excavated by Susan Janes, who moved to Fort Davis with her husband in 1893. In 1895 the Janeses' son Charles, and Tom Merrill found a cairn on its highest point. They demolished the cairn and discovered a scattering of arrowheads underneath it.

== Gallery ==
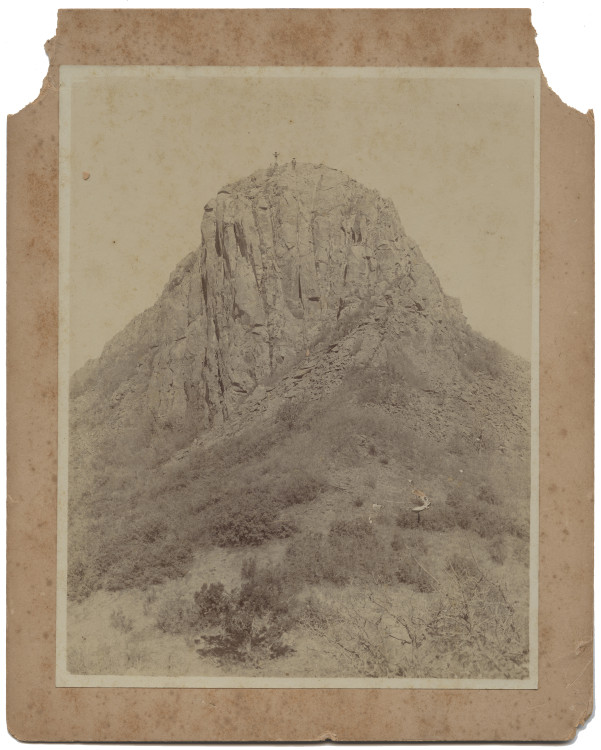
ca.1910-1920
