= Granite Peak (Humboldt County, Nevada) =

Mountain in Nevada, United States

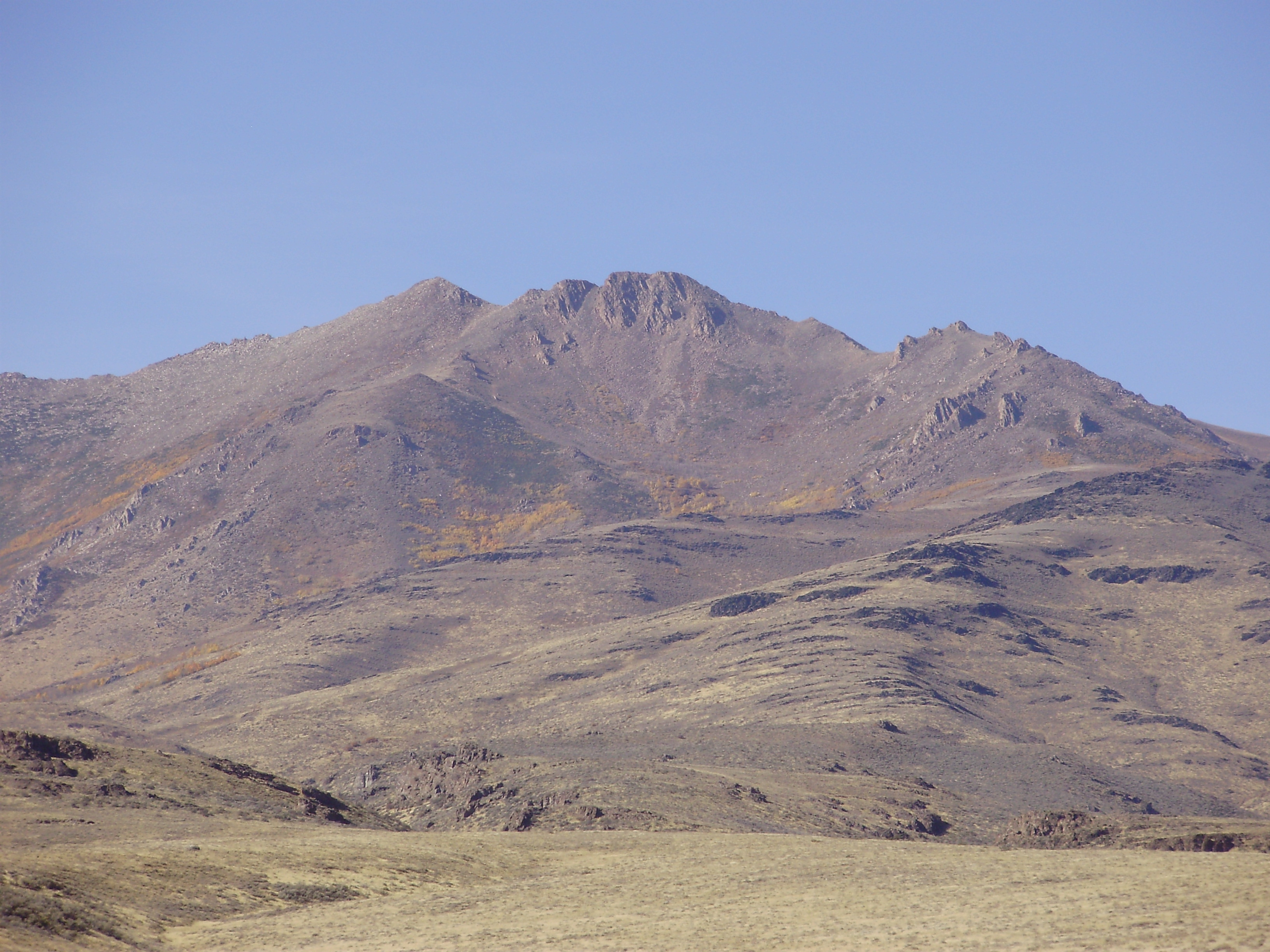
- View of Granite Peak from Hinkey Summit Road near the Humboldt-Toiyabe National Forest boundary

Highest point
- Elevation: 9,736 ft (2,968 m) NAVD 88
- Prominence: 4,397 ft (1,340 m)
- Listing: Nevada County High Points 14th
- Coordinates: 41°40′05″N 117°35′20″W

Geography
- Location within Nevada
- Location: Humboldt County, Nevada, U.S.
- Parent range: Santa Rosa Range
- Topo map: USGS Hinkey Summit

Climbing
- Easiest route: From Hinkey Summit, west along a 4-wheel drive road and then the ridgeline, small segment of Class 3 climbing

Granite Peak is the highest mountain in both the Santa Rosa Range and Humboldt County, in Nevada, United States. It is the eighteenth-most topographically prominent peak in the state. The peak is located within the Santa Rosa Ranger District of the Humboldt-Toiyabe National Forest, about 12 miles north of the small town of Paradise Valley and 23 miles southeast of the small town of McDermitt. It is the highest mountain for over 80 miles in all directions.

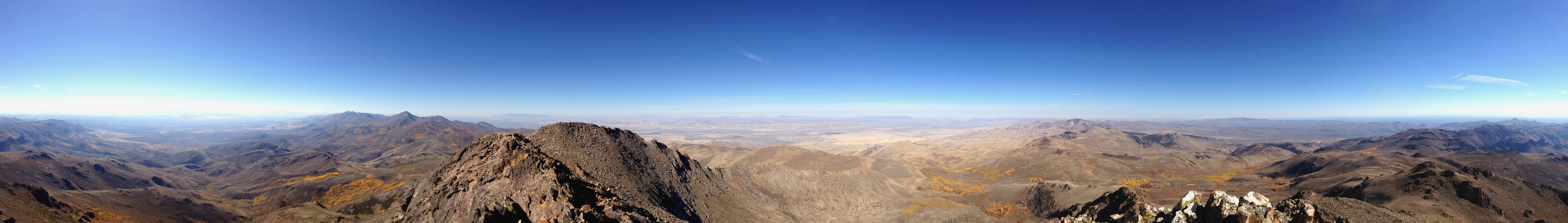
360-degree panorama from the summit of Granite Peak
