= Santa Rosa Range =

Mountain range in Nevada, United States

- Location within Nevada

Highest point
- Peak: Granite Peak
- Elevation: 2,966 m (9,731 ft)

Geography
- Country: United States
- State: Nevada
- District: Humboldt County
- Range coordinates: 41°27′25.632″N 117°41′0.479″W
- Topo map: USGS Five Fingers

The Santa Rosa Range is a mountain range in Humboldt County, Nevada, United States. Most of the range is included within the Humboldt-Toiyabe National Forest. The highest peaks in the range are Granite Peak (9732 feet, 2966 m) and Santa Rosa Peak (9701 feet, 2957 m). The range extends for approximately 75 miles (120 km) north from Winnemucca Mountain near Winnemucca through eastern Humboldt County to the border with Oregon. The upper elevations of the southern section of the range are protected as the Santa Rosa–Paradise Peak Wilderness Area.

The eastern side of the range is a ranching district around Paradise Valley, drained by the Little Humboldt River, a tributary of the Humboldt. The Quinn River Valley is west of the range. The Owyhee Desert on the edge of the Columbia Plateau extends northeast from the north end of the range.

The range was so named on account of wild roses which grow in the area.
