= Isabel Pass =

Mountain pass of Alaska, US

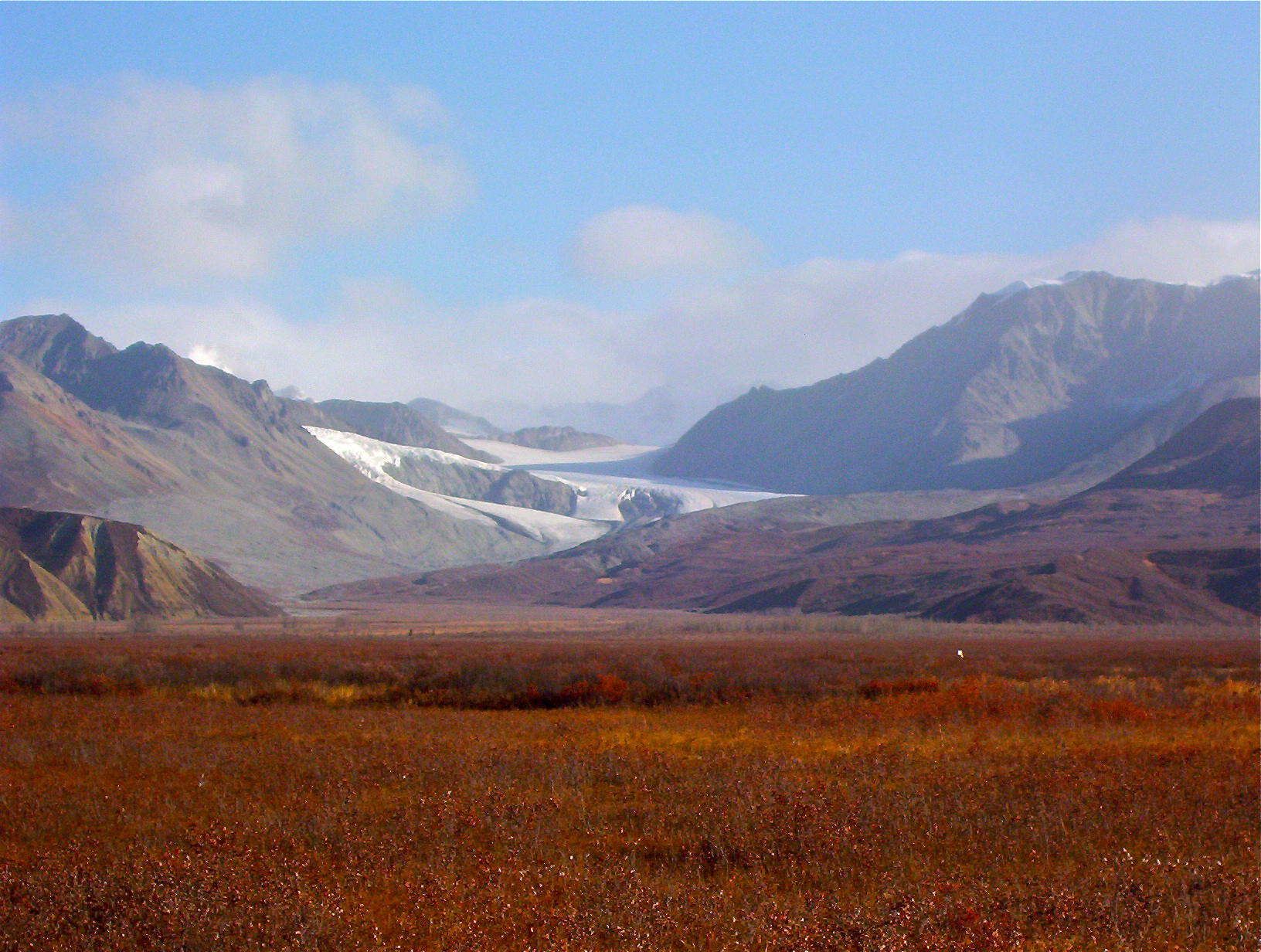
- Gulkana Glacier seen from Isabel Pass

- Location within Alaska
- Elevation: 3,242 ft (988 m)
- Traversed by: Richardson Highway

Third Approach
- Location: Copper River Census Area, Alaska, U.S.
- Range: Alaska Range
- Coordinates: 63°11′15″N 145°33′29″W
- Topo map: USGS Mount Hayes A-4 NE

Isabel Pass (sometimes Delta River Pass) (/ˈɑːtnə/; Ahtena: Dzeł Ghatgge, "between the mountains") is a 40 mile long gap in the eastern section of the Alaska Range which serves as a corridor for the Richardson Highway about 11 miles from Paxson. It is named after Isabelle Barnette, the wife of E. T. Barnette, who helped found Fairbanks. The pass separates four regions, the Tanana Valley to the north, the Delta Mountains to the east, Copper River Basin to the south, and the Hayes Range to the west.

It is one of three highway passes of the Alaska Range, the others being Windy Pass for the George Parks Highway and Mentasta Pass for the Tok Cut-Off.

== Geography ==
Isabel Pass is also known as the Delta River Valley or the Delta River Pass. It is approximately bounded by Phelan Creek sourced by the Gulkana Glacier at the south, to Donnelly Dome to the north. The area has been heavily affected by various glaciations. Castner Glacier is located on its southern end.

It is one of the drainage divides of the Alaska Range. To the north, is the Yukon River drainage that flows into the Bering Sea, and to the south is the Copper River drainage that flows into the Pacific Ocean. The Delta River, a tributary to the Tanana River, is the primary river that flows through the pass. The area around the pass is dominated by peaks of up to 9000 feet above sea level, some of which have glaciers.

The area is also geologically active. The Denali Fault approximately bisects the pass, near Miller Creek, just south of Canwell Glacier. There is also evidence of jökulhlaups caused by surging glaciers temporarily damming the Delta River and/or its tributaries. Rain driven flash flooding and landslides are also known to occur.

== History ==
=== Before the 19th Century ===
Isabel Pass was formed predominately by the Delta River, with intermittent contribution from Phelan Creek, in the early Oligocene as the Alaska Range was beginning to be uplifted. However, Phelan Creek has not always been a tributary to the Delta River. It has sometimes flowed into Summit Lake, making it a part of the Gulkana River. In the late Pleistocene, it was blocked with glaciers that contributed to the formation of the prehistoric glacial Lake Atna.

The pass is an important connection between the Ahtna and the Tanana people. Historically, it was a place for trade between the two groups, where the Ahtna would bring copper sourced along the Copper River and seashells traded from the coast to the Tanana to trade for their furs. Trade usually occurred in late summer, where abundant caribou attracted many people. Additionally, Ahtna and Middle Tanana place names of the surrounding area describe land features formed by ice that no longer exists, which suggests that they have been living in the area since at least the last ice age:

In ancient times, outlier mountains proximate to major passes through the Alaska Range would have been known by every Dene foot traveler as important landmarks. If a Dene traveler were walking north or south through Isabel Pass in the Alaska Range, the isolated mountain Donnelly Dome, Łuu Tahwdzeey’ (Middle Tanana) and Łuu Tahwdzaeye’ (Ahtna) for ‘heart among glaciers’, would be a foremark or backmark walking north or south between the Tanana and Copper River drainages.

— James Kari

=== 19th Century Onwards ===
Starting in the late 1880s to mid 1890s, gold discoveries north of the Alaska Range in the Fortymile Mining District, near Circle, and in the western Yukon, among other areas, put pressure on the US Congress to explore Alaska. In March of 1898, the US Department of War funded three expeditions to explore Southcentral Alaska. Edwin Glenn led the expedition ordered to explore from Prince William Sound to Cook Inlet for routes between the Susitna and Copper rivers then northward to the Tanana River. Attached to the expedition was geologist Walter Mendenhall from the USGS. The party was the first recorded non-natives to cross the pass, however they turned around 15 to 20 miles short the Tanana River due short supplies and lateness of the season.

This route received little attention at the time. Speaking about his experiences ten years later, Lieutenant Joseph Castner said:

[A] well-beaten path traveled yearly by hundreds goes up our old Gulkona [sic] and down our Delta to the Tanana, traversing one of the best passes through the Alaska Alps.

The founding of Fairbanks in 1901 began non-native interest in Isabel Pass. Sometime in the spring of 1902, E.T. and Isabelle Barnette crossed the pass on their way to Valdez and onto Puget Sound to purchase supplies for the newly formed city. The pass was then named after Isabelle, although it was spelled incorrectly. Later that year, gold was discovered in Fairbanks, which drew attention away from the Klondike Gold Rush. This resulted in the establishment of the Valdez-Fairbanks Trail, an offshoot of the earlier Valdez-Eagle Trail. The early trail followed the Valdez-Eagle Trail, then split at the Gakona River, then crossed Isabel Pass and the Tanana Valley. By 1903, horses were being used to haul supplies and mail over the pass, replacing sled dogs.

Very soon after the establishment of the trail, roadhouses were built along, although many faced difficulties keeping them profitable. In general, the roadhouses along the pass proved to be invaluable to travelers, providing shelter from strong winter storms. Yost's Roadhouse, first known as McCallum's Roadhouse, opened at the northern end of Isabel Pass at the confluence of Phelan Creek and McCallum Creek in 1905 at an elevation of 2,897 feet. Another roadhouse was built roughly 20 miles north in 1904, known as Miller's Roadhouse. Rapids Roadhouse, later Black Rapids Roadhouse, started in 1902-1903 as just a tent, but a two story log building was built soon afterward. At the northern end of the pass, Donnelly's Roadhouse started in 1906, which was among the most popular. Several other roadhouses existed in the area, either as tents or cabins, but they had uncertain distances between points and were very short lived. All of roadhouses in the area were closed by 1930.

In 1903, Lieutenant William Mitchell, Judge James Wickersham, and several Fairbanks residents testified to a senatorial party visiting Alaska, pressuring them for transportation infrastructure. By early 1905, Major Wilds Richardson was appointed by President Teddy Roosevelt to supervise construction of an all-season wagon road from Valdez to Fairbanks, which was completed in 1910 . The first recorded automobile to go through the pass was in 1913 driven by Bobby Sheldon and three passengers. The wagon trail later became the Richardson Highway, the first long-distance road in Alaska.

The pass came under the soil and water conservation of the Salcha-Big Delta Soil and Water Sub-District in 1950, known today as the Salcha-Delta Soil and Water Conservation District. The highway going through the pass remained gravel until it was paved in 1955 and provided year round travel. The Northern Warfare Training Center was established at Black Rapids in 1956, near the middle of the Isabel Pass.

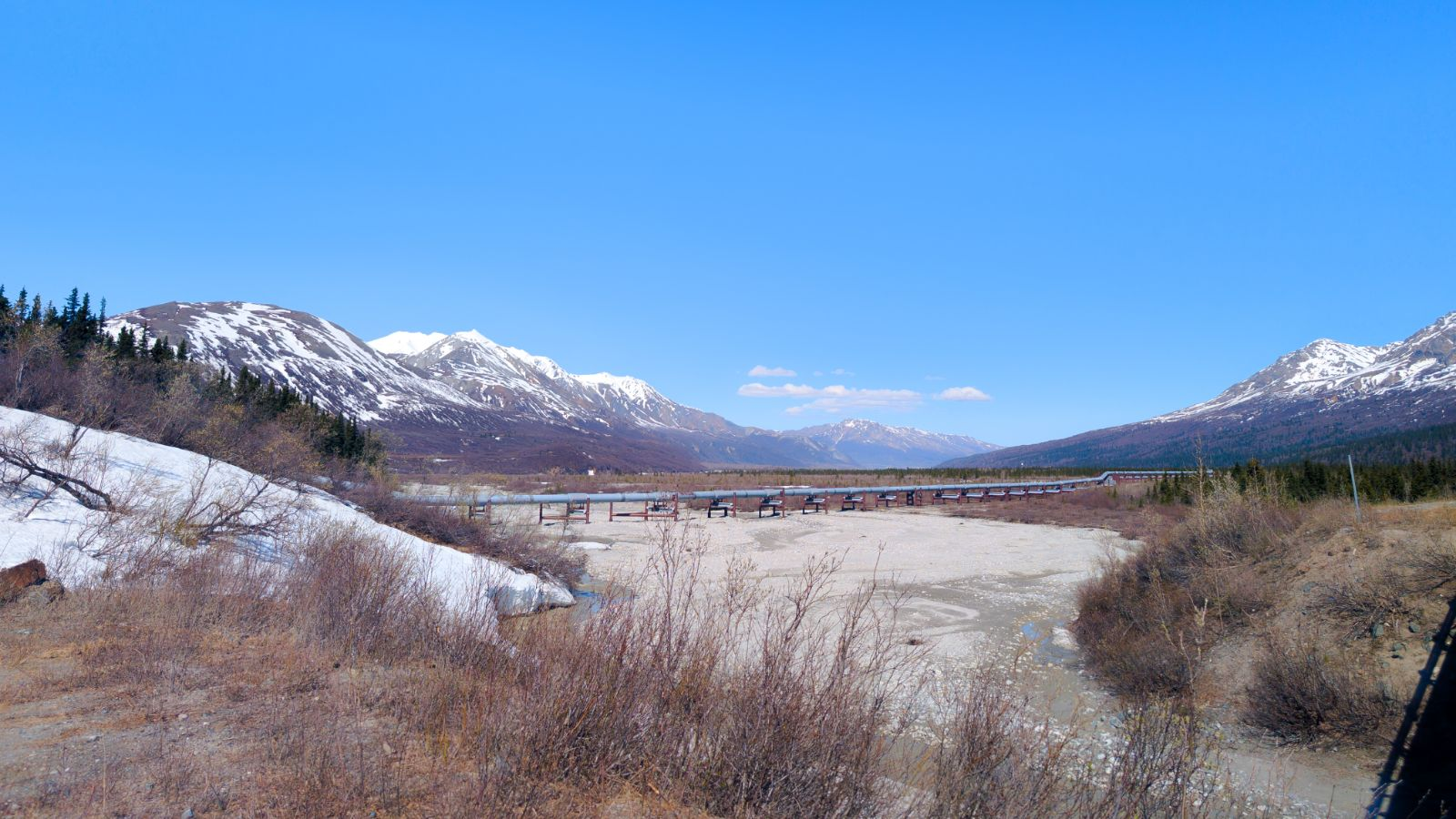
Looking northward in Isabel Pass near Lower Miller Creek. The Trans-Alaska Pipeline System is in the foreground.

In the late 1970s, the Trans-Alaska Pipeline was built through the pass. The camp situated at Isabel Pass was also the largest, outside of the main camp at Valdez, during pipeline construction, with 1,652 beds.

The 2002 Denali earthquake struck the region. Landslides occurred near the pass around the fault line, but most were within 30 km of the fault. Soil liquefaction was observed south of the fault line which caused damage to buildings. Around the fault crossing there was localized sand blows and minor fissures.

In mid July of 2022, heavy rain in throughout the pass caused flash flooding and mudslides, leading the closure of the Richardson Highway. Five inches of rain fell at Black Rapids Roadhouse on July 10, which washed out one bridge and damaging several others. Internet and cell phone interruptions were also reported due to a damaged fiber optic cable. On July 21, Governor Mike Dunleavy declared a state disaster, with costs associated with repairing the damages to be over $10 million.
