= Castner =

Castner is a German surname. Notable people with the surname include:

- Caspar Castner (1655–1709), German Roman Catholic missionary
- Eugene Castner Lewis (1845–1917), American engineer and businessman
- Hamilton Castner (1858–1899), American industrial chemist
- Joseph Compton Castner (1869–1946), American general
- Lawrence V. Castner (1902–1949), American businessman, fencer and military officer
- Michael Castner, American journalist
- Paul Castner (1897–1986), American baseball player
