= Gulkana =

Gulkana can mean the following,

- Gulkana, Alaska, a census-designated place (CDP) in Copper River Census Area, Alaska, U.S.
- Gulkana Glacier, glacier that flows from the ice fields of the south flank of the eastern Alaska Range
- Gulkana River, a 60-mile (97 km) tributary of the Copper River in the U.S. state of Alaska
