= Mount Kimball =

Mountain in the eastern Alaskan Range of the United States of America

- Location within Alaska

Highest point
- Elevation: 10,300+ ft (3,139+ m)
- Prominence: 7,424 ft (2,263 m)
- Listing: North America prominent peak 56th
- Coordinates: 63°14′19″N 144°38′38″W

Geography
- Location: Southeast Fairbanks Census Area, Alaska, U.S.
- Parent range: Delta Mountains, Alaska Range
- Topo map: USGS Mount Hayes A-2

Climbing
- First ascent: June 13, 1969 by Tom Kensler, Mike Sallee, Dan Osborne, Grace Hoeman
- Easiest route: Southwest Ridge: glacier/snow/ice/rock climb (Alaska Grade 2+)

Mount Kimball is the highest mountain in the Delta Range, a subrange of the Alaska Range between Isabel Pass and Mentasta Pass, about 30 miles from Paxson. It is one of the twenty most topographically prominent peaks in Alaska.

Mount Kimball is a relatively difficult climb for a peak with low absolute elevation, due to difficult ridge terrain, and it rebuffed eight climbing attempts by experienced Alaskan mountaineers before its first ascent in 1969. Due to its remoteness, difficulty, and low stature compared to other major Alaskan summits, the peak is not often climbed.

== See also ==
- List of mountain peaks of North America
  - List of mountain peaks of the United States
    - List of mountain peaks of Alaska
- List of Ultras of the United States
