= Mentasta =

Mentasta can refer to:

- Ahtna people of Alaska
- Mentasta Mountains, Alaska
- Mentasta Pass, Mentasta Mountains
