= Mount Gakona =

Mountain in Alaska, United States

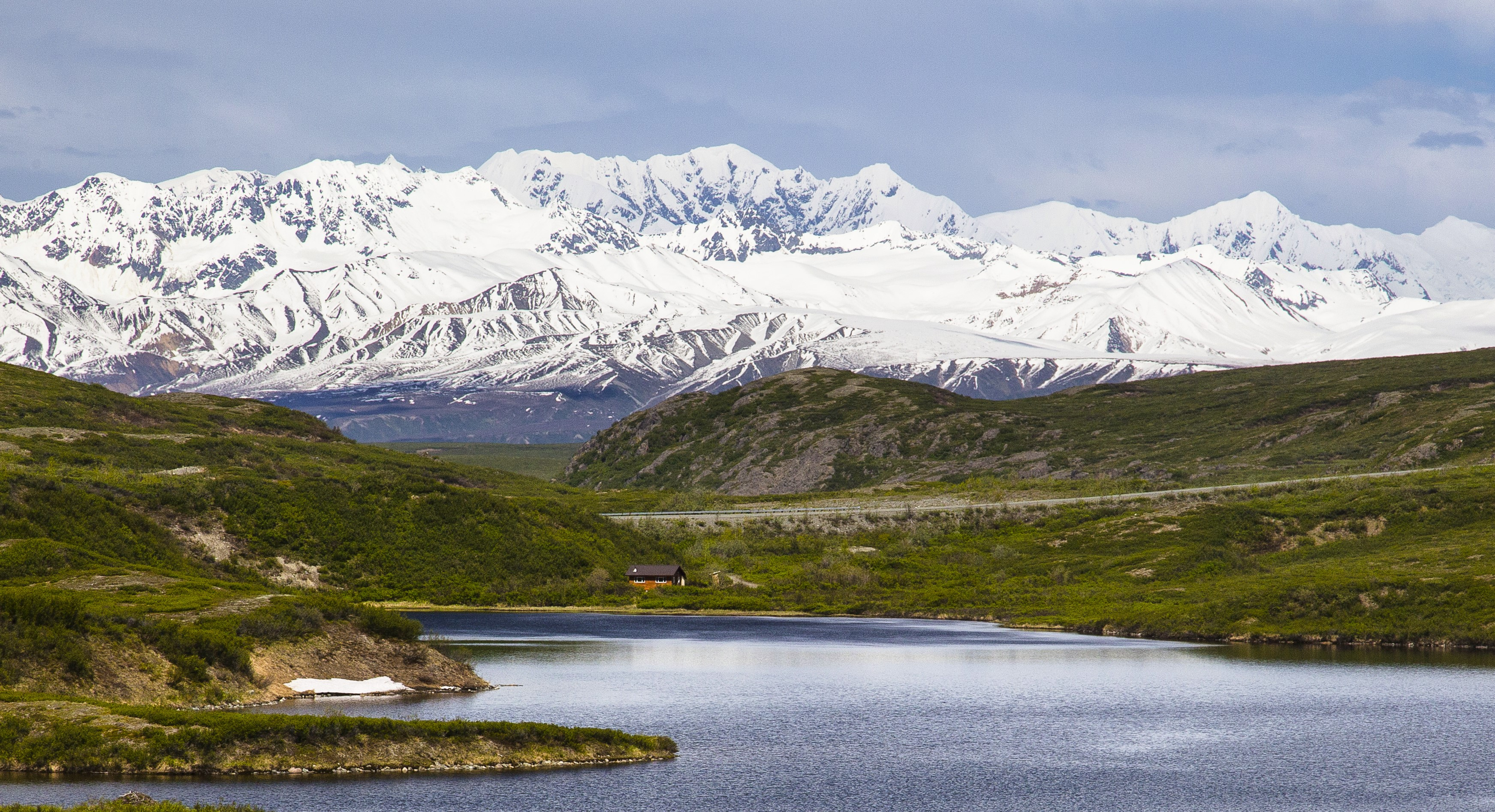
- Southwest aspect centered at top

Highest point
- Elevation: 9,865 ft (3,007 m)
- Prominence: 2,313 ft (705 m)
- Parent peak: Mount Kimball (10,300 ft)
- Isolation: 7.73 mi (12.44 km)
- Coordinates: 63°19′21″N 145°10′51″W

Geography
- Location within Alaska
- Interactive map of Mount Gakona
- Country: United States
- State: Alaska
- Census Area: Southeast Fairbanks
- Parent range: Alaska Range; Delta Mountains
- Topo map: USGS Mount Hayes B-3

Climbing
- First ascent: 1970

Mount Gakona is a 9,865-foot-elevation (3,007-meter) mountain summit in Alaska.

== Description ==
Mount Gakona is located 22 miles (35 km) northeast of Paxson in the Delta Mountains which are a subrange of the Alaska Range. The heavily glaciated mountain ranks as the fourth-highest peak in the Delta Mountains. Precipitation runoff and glacial meltwater from the mountain's north slope drains to Johnson Glacier → Johnson River → Tanana River, whereas the south slope drains to the Gakona Glacier → Gakona River → Copper River. Topographic relief is significant as the summit rises 4,865 feet (1,483 meters) above the Johnson Glacier in 1.3 mile (2.1 km). The first ascent of the summit was made on March 24, 1980, by Daniel Osborne, Steve O'Brien, Mark Hottman, and Toby Wheeler. The climbers reported that the mountain has two peaks separated one mile apart by a knife-edged ridge. The word "Gakona" /ɡəˈkoʊnə/ (Ggax Kuna' in Ahtna language) means "rabbit" or "rabbit river." The mountain's toponym has been officially adopted by the United States Board on Geographic Names.

== Climate ==
According to the Köppen climate classification system, Mount Gakona is located in a tundra climate zone with cold, snowy winters, and cool summers. Weather systems are forced upwards by the Delta Mountains (orographic lift), causing heavy precipitation in the form of rainfall and snowfall. Winter temperatures can drop below 0 °F with wind chill factors below −10 °F. This climate supports the Johnson Glacier, Gakona Glacier, and smaller unnamed glaciers surrounding the peak.

== See also ==
- Gakona, Alaska
- Geography of Alaska
