= Ed Walker (American veteran) =

American politician and businessman

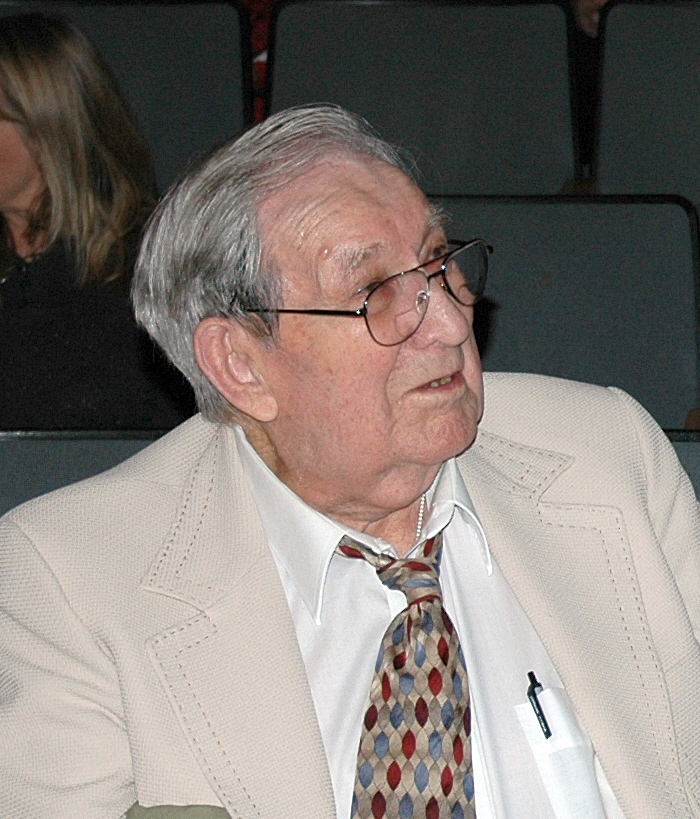
Ed Walker, the second-to-last surviving member of Castner's Cutthroats, in 2008.

Edgar Walker (August 28, 1917 – October 28, 2011) was an American veteran of World War II, businessman, publisher and writer. Walker was the penultimate surviving member of "Castner's Cutthroats", a regiment consisting of sixty-five men who performed reconnaissance missions in the Aleutian Islands during World War II. Castner's Cutthroats was the unofficial name of the 1st Alaskan Combat Intelligence Platoon.

== Early life ==
Walker was born on August 28, 1917, in San Juan Bautista, California. He enlisted in the United States Army in 1937 and was stationed for three years in the Territory of Hawaii. He soon became interested in Alaska through reading a library book about the territory and an article published in The Saturday Evening Post. He reenlisted in the Army with the specific goal of being transferred to Alaska.

== Castner's Cutthroats ==
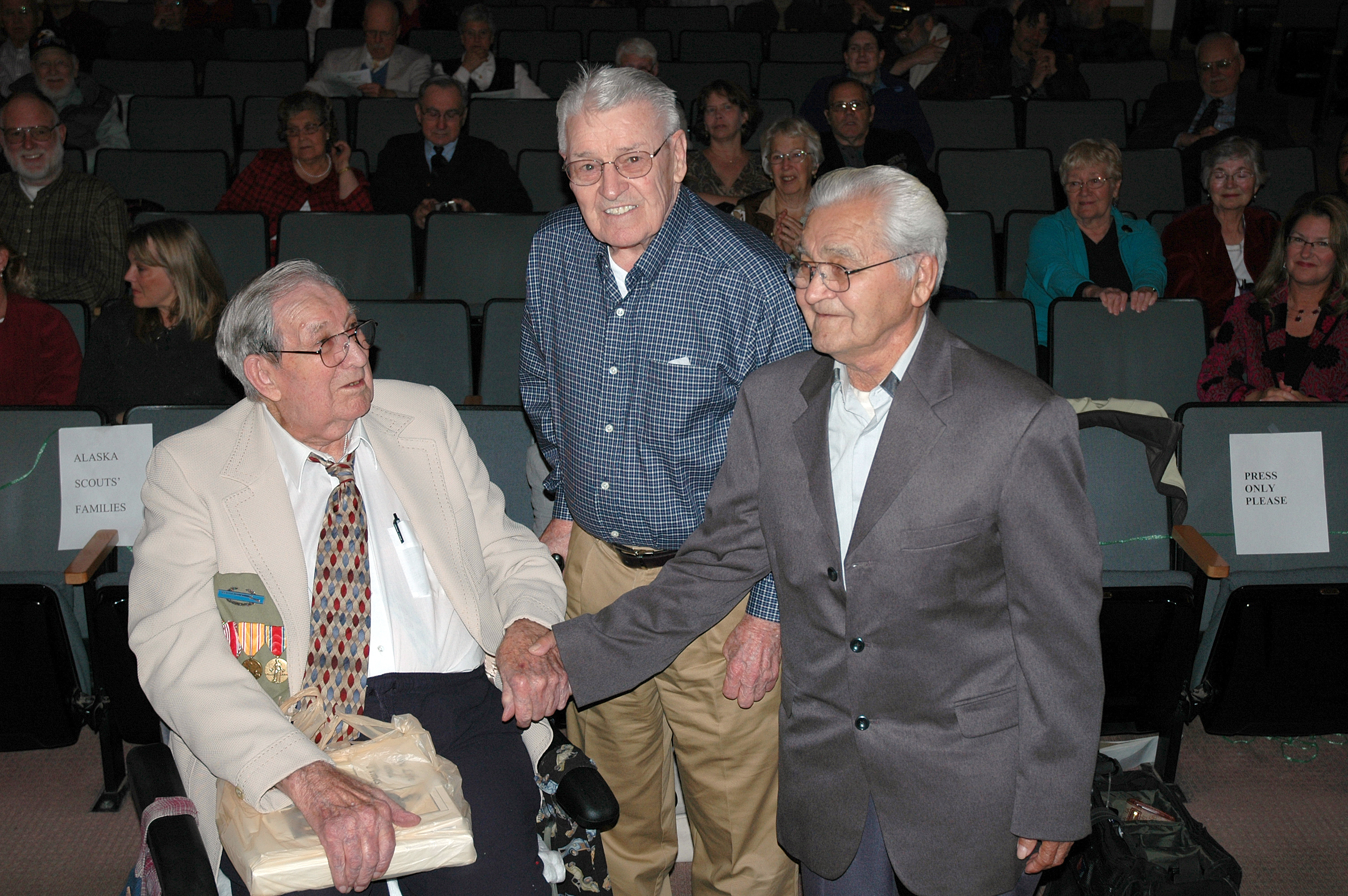
The last three surviving members of Castner's Cutthroats – Ed Walker (left), Earl Acuff (center), and Billy Buck at the Anchorage Museum in 2008.

Walker was stationed with the Army infantry at Chilkoot Barracks (also known as Fort William H. Seward), which was the only U.S. military base in the Territory of Alaska at the time he arrived. Walker submitted several applications, before finally being transferred to Fort Richardson (now a part of Joint Base Elmendorf-Richardson). There he joined a group of elite Alaskan Scouts called Castner's Cutthroats, named after Col. Lawrence V. Castner, an Army intelligence officer who formed the regiment. Walker trained with Castner's Cutthroats, who carried their provisions and lived off what they could find in the Alaskan wilderness, such as seafood. Walker was trained in surveying and Morse code. The sixty-five men served in reconnaissance throughout the Aleutian Islands during World War II, including the Battle of the Aleutian Islands.

The Japanese forces occupied the islands of Attu and Kiska the day before Walker's 25th birthday in 1942, beginning the Aleutian Islands Campaign. Walker and thirty-six of the scouts were stationed in Anchorage at the time, when they received erroneous reports of a Japanese attack on the city. The next morning, the members of Castner's Cutthroats sailed on a yacht from Anchorage to the Aleutian Islands. However, the United States Navy commandeered the yacht at Kodiak. Walker and twenty-one other Alaskan Scouts then boarded a submarine, which they used to make their first landing at Adak Island. He was armed with a Browning Automatic Rifle, which meant that he was among the first of the Cutthroats to make landfall at Adak and secure the surrounding beach. However, a two-man American boat next to their submarine exploded just offshore from Adak. Walker recalled the accident in a 2008 interview, "We got about 200 yards from the submarine, and the boat blew up. It put both of us in the drink...The boat was about to go to the bottom, and we didn't want to go with it. We managed to stay afloat, and luckily the submarine, rather than turning to the left and going back into the Pacific, it turned inland," Walker continued, explaining a line was thrown to the scouts as it passed because the submarine was unable to stop. I hung on to that, and of course we were at the fantail of the sub, and there's a series of welded pipes that protect the propeller and we each got a hold of one of them, and every time we went through a wave, we just stopped breathing and closed our eyes and came back up...They sent a man out, and they had to crawl because everything on the submarine was slippery. They crawled out and helped us to get our gear, because we still had our packs and we went on in to the sub."

== Post-war career ==
Walker settled permanently in southern Alaska following World War II. He and Con Frank co-founded the Arctic Block Construction Co. in 1947. Together, Walker and Frank constructed most of the first permanent buildings at Eielson Air Force Base and Ladd Army Airfield during the bases' early years. He also worked in Goodnews Bay at a mining facility. Walker was a proponent of Alaskan statehood during the 1940s and 1950s.

In 1960, Walker moved to Valdez, Alaska, where he worked as a home builder. Once the 1964 Alaska earthquake struck the area, Walker switched his focus to the reconstruction of the city. He was elected to the Valdez city council during the rebuilding efforts and the construction of the Trans-Alaska pipeline through the region. His last major Valdez construction project was the former Village Inn Motel, which is now the Mountain Sky Hotel and Suites.

Walker published his own newspaper, called Walker's Weekly, while living in Delta Junction, Alaska. He authored several books, including writings on his experiences with Castner's Cutthroats. He was interviewed by author Jim Rearden, who included Walker in his book, Castner's Cutthroats: Saga of the Alaska Scouts. Walker also wrote an eclectic mix of books concentrating on his other life experiences. He wrote the nonfiction historical book, Twenty Women Who Made America Great, following the death of his longtime wife, Frances Walker. A hip replacement patient, Walker wrote Hip-Hip Hooray! on life before and after the procedure.

In 2008 and 2009, photos and quotes from Walker and other members of the regiment appeared in an exhibit, Castner's Cutthroats: Forgotten Warriors, which opened at the Anchorage Museum. The last three surviving members of Castner's Cutthroats – Walker, retired Brig. Gen. Earl Acuff, and William "Billy" Buck – gathered at the opening of the exhibition on September 28, 2008.

== Personal life ==
Walker met his future wife, Frances Park, while she was employed by the U.S. Army Corps of Engineers, who were constructing the Alaska Highway at the time. The couple married at a ceremony in Fort Richardson on April 29, 1944. They had four children: Bob, Suzy, Kathleen and Bill, who was elected Governor of Alaska in 2014. The family moved to Fairbanks after World War II. Frances Walker worked as a writer for the Fairbanks Daily News-Miner. They moved to Valdez, Alaska, in 1960.

Walker resided at the Alaska Veterans and Pioneers Home in Palmer, Alaska, for most of the last quarter century of his life. A widower, he died at Providence Alaska Medical Center in Anchorage, Alaska, on October 28, 2011, aged 94.
