= Summit Lake (Paxson, Alaska) =

Lake in Alaska, United States

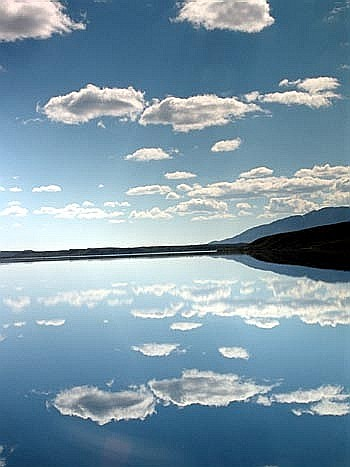
- A summer view across Summit Lake

- Location of Summit Lake within the State of Alaska
- Location: Paxson, Alaska; United States
- Coordinates: 63°8′20″N 145°33′00″W
- Type: Natural lake
- Part of: Copper River Basin
- Primary inflows: Gunn Greek
- Primary outflows: Gulkana River
- Basin countries: United States
- Max. length: 7.1 miles (11.4 km)
- Max. width: 1.1 miles (1.8 km)
- Surface area: 4,083.2 acres (16.524 km^{2})
- Average depth: 70 feet (21 m)
- Max. depth: 214 feet (65 m)
- Water volume: 1,083,344 cubic yards (828,276 m^{3})
- Surface elevation: 3,300 feet (1,000 m)
- Frozen: From early November to mid-June
- Islands: 1

Summit Lake is located above the tree line on the south slope of the Alaska Range between miles 192 and 196 of the Richardson Highway (AR-4). It is about 200 miles (320 km) north of Valdez, 180 miles (290 km) south of Fairbanks, and just south of Isabel Pass at an elevation of 3,300 feet (1,000 m). It is also situated within the northeast corner of the census-designated place of Paxson, about 15 miles (24 km) upstream (north) of Paxson Lake.

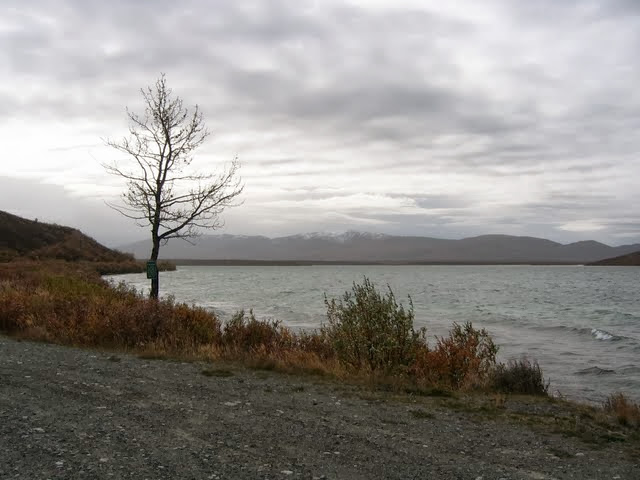
Shoreline of Summit Lake, just off the Richardson Highway

It is glacier-fed by several creeks to the north, including Gunn Creek (which flows from the Gulkana Glacier). There are also additional creeks that feed into the lake from the west and southeast. The lake is up to 300 feet (91 m) deep and is covered with ice up to 5 feet (1.5 m) thick from November until mid-June. It is also the headwaters of the Gulkana River (a main tributary of the Copper River) well known for its "Copper River Reds" salmon, which migrate in late September to spawn in Gunn Creek on the north end of the lake. The lake is 7.1 miles (11.4 km) long, 1.1 miles (1.8 km) wide, and has a surface area of 6.28 square miles (16.3 km^{2}).

The area is known for the annual Arctic Man Summit Lake Classic ski and snow-machine race, attended by up to 13,000 visitors each April, weather permitting.

== See also ==
- Gulkana River
- Paxson, Alaska
- Richardson Highway
- Summit Lake (Alaska)—disambiguation page
