= Silvertip =

Silvertip may refer to:

- Silvertip bear, a name sometimes used to refer to the grizzly bear

- The Everett Silvertips, a WHL hockey team named for the bear

- Silvertip badger, a grade of badger hair used in a shave brush
- Silvertip fir, a type of evergreen tree (Abies magnifica) often used as a Christmas tree
- Silvertip shark, a large and slender shark (Carcharhinus albimarginatus) found at or close to offshore remote island reefs
- Silvertip tetra, a small freshwater fish (Hasemania nana) found in Brazil
- Silvertip Mountain, in British Columbia
- Silvertip Peak, a summit in Washington
- Silvertip Peak (Wyoming), a summit in Wyoming
- Mount Silvertip, a summit in Alaska
