= E. T. Barnette =

First mayor of Fairbanks, Alaska

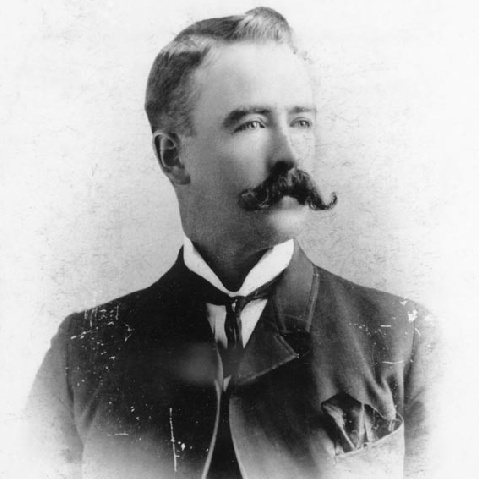

1st Mayor of Fairbanks, Alaska
- In office 1903–1906
- Preceded by: Office Established
- Succeeded by: B. D. Mills

Personal details
- Born: Ebenezer Truman Barnette; 1863 Akron, Ohio
- Died: May 22, 1933 (aged 70) Los Angeles, California
- Spouse: Isabelle Cleary

Elbridge Truman Barnette (1863 – May 22, 1933) was a Yukon riverboat captain, banker, postmaster and swindler, who founded the city of Fairbanks, Alaska, and later served as its first mayor.

== Biography ==
He was born in 1863 in Akron, Ohio to Truman C. Barnett (1832-1872) and Amanda Averill (1835-1913). In 1886, he was sentenced to four years in prison in Oregon state for stealing from a partner in a horse-trading venture in Canada. Political connections of the Barnette family saw the sentence commuted after one year, on the condition that Barnette never return to Oregon.

=== Stampede to Dawson ===
Barnette was in Helena, Montana, in the summer of 1897 when he received the news of gold strikes in the Klondike. On August 2, 1897, he arrived in Seattle, Washington, where with 160 other passengers, he boarded the steamer Cleveland, bound for St. Michael, Alaska, on the Bering Sea. At St. Michael, Barnette partnered with other stampeders to purchase another steamer, the St. Michael, with the intention of steaming up the Yukon River to Dawson. Barnette was nominated the captain. He was henceforth known as "Captain Barnette".

The St. Michael only made it as far as Circle, Alaska, before a series of misfortunes including a breakdown, a fire, an outbreak of disease among the crew, and the freezing over of the Yukon halted any further progress. Barnette set out for Dawson by dogsled, but he arrived to find himself months too late: Every creek already had been staked.

Barnette took a job in Dawson managing mines for the North American Trading and Transportation Company (NT&T). At NT&T, he made the acquaintance of John Healy, an entrepreneur from Montana. Healy laid out a plan to build a railroad from Valdez, Alaska, to Eagle, Alaska, what he called an "All-American Route" to the Klondike. Barnette came away with the idea of establishing a trading post at the halfway point, where the railroad would cross the Tanana River (near modern-day Tanacross, Alaska). Barnette imagined such a settlement could grow to become the "Chicago of Alaska".

Barnette returned to Helena in 1898, where he married Isabelle Cleary.

=== Up the Tanana ===
In 1901, Barnette partnered with Charles Smith, an acquaintance from Circle, arranging for $20,000 in supplies to be shipped from San Francisco, California, to St. Michael. Back in Circle, he purchased the 124-foot steamer Arctic Boy, steaming down the Yukon to meet the cargo with the intention of carrying it back up the river to establish the trading post. At St. Michael, the Arctic Boy was loaded with 130 tons of merchandise, but the steamer ran aground before reaching the mouth of the Yukon and had to be beached in order to save the cargo. Having no other means to transport the merchandise further, Barnette and Smith sold it to local entrepreneurs, only to repurchase it when customs officer James H. Causten invested $6,000 in the enterprise in return for a third share of profits.

==== The Lavelle Young ====
Barnette and Smith used the $6,000 from Causten to hire Charles Adams, captain of the 150 foot sternwheeler, the Lavelle Young. Captain Adams agreed to carry E.T. and Isabelle Barnette, Charles Smith, their employees and their cargo to the head of navigation of the Tanana River, at least as far as the Chena Slough. This was 200 miles short of Tanana Crossing, where Captain William R. Abercrombie had just completed the U.S. Army's trail between Valdez and Eagle. The construction of the Valdez-Eagle Trail seemed to confirm Healy's vision of the "All-American Route" to the Klondike. But it was late in the year, when Alaska's glacier-fed rivers run shallow, and Adams doubted that the heavily laden steamer could make it that far.

In August 1901, the Lavelle Young set out from St. Michael. Late in the month, it reached the shallow Bates Rapids (near Big Delta, Alaska) of the Tanana River and could proceed no further. Barnette convinced Adams to attempt a detour. Believing that it was possible to use the Chena River to bypass the Bates Rapids, Barnette directed Adams to return to the Chena Slough. But the plan failed when they ran up against sandbars only 6–8 miles above the mouth of the Chena River. Adams refused to proceed further. At 4 p.m. on August 26, the passengers and cargo were unloaded on a spruce-covered bluff on the south side of the river. "We left Barnette furious," Adams recalled. "His wife was weeping on the bank."

==== Chenoa City ====
Barnette and his crew set about constructing a temporary trading post consisting of two log buildings: A 26 by 54 foot store called "Barnette's Cache" (later, "Barnette's Trading Post"), and a small cabin to serve as the Barnettes' residence. The buildings were raised on the site of what would later become the heart of downtown Fairbanks, between Cowles Street and Cushman Street. Barnette named the post "Chenoa City." He decided to pass the winter there, continuing up river to Tanana Crossing the following summer.

During the winter, Barnette sent Dan McCarty, one of his hired hands, to Valdez in order to escort Isabelle's brother, Frank J. Cleary, back to the post. McCarty and Cleary returned on February 20, 1902. Cleary was charged with taking care of the post while the Barnettes made a trip to Seattle to purchase additional supplies as well as a flat-bottomed boat capable of proceeding further up the Tanana. On March 10, E.T. and Isabelle set out by dogsled, crossing the Saint Elias Mountains to reach the port of Valdez. In Seattle, Barnette purchased a boat he named Isabelle, ordering it shipped in pieces to St. Michael.

The Isabelle was assembled to incorporate whatever machinery could be salvaged from the wrecked Arctic Boy. While Barnette was in St. Michael, overseeing the process, he made the acquaintance of district judge James Wickersham, who had been appointed to the judgeship of the Third District by President William McKinley in 1900. Wickersham suggested to Barnette that he name his post on the Tanana after Wickersham's mentor, up-and-coming Indiana Senator Charles W. Fairbanks. In his July 19, 1902, diary entry, Wickersham recorded that Barnette "promised to do so."

The Isabelle was completed in September, but once again it proved to be too late in the year to reach Tanana Crossing. The Isabelle could not even make it as far as Chenoa City, grounded by sandbars 4 miles downstream. When Barnette reached the post, using small boats to ferry supplies from the Isabelle, he was informed that Pedroni had finally located the rich vein that he had been looking for. Pedroni, who had been grubstaked by Cleary in April, had returned in late July to confide his discovery.

     Pedroni had changed his name to Felix Pedro, which and who can be found in another Wikipedia article.

=== The Fairbanks Gold Rush ===
Barnette abandoned his plan to continue to Tanana Crossing. On September 27, 1902, he was elected recorder for the newly formed Fairbanks Mining District. At the end of December, with the most immediately profitable claims recorded, Barnette dispatched an employee, a Japanese adventurer named Jujiro Wada, to Dawson to spread the news of Pedro's strike in order to drum up business. January 17, 1903, Dawson's Yukon Sun newspaper published a story entitled Rich Strike Made in the Tanana. Within two days, the story made the front page of The New York Times. The Fairbanks Gold Rush was on.

Abe Spring, a resident of the Tanana Valley since 1900, and an eventual mayor of Fairbanks, counted "seven or eight hundred people" who braved deadly cold to arrive in the Fairbanks Mining District during the winter of 1902–1903. But the first prospectors to reach Fairbanks were frustrated by creeks that could not be mined in winter and squeezed by price gouging at Barnette's Trading Post. Barnette's monopoly allowed him to set his own prices and bundle products together in whatever fashion yielded the most profit. Prospectors who wanted to buy a bag of flour were also required to buy three cases of canned goods. Hungry and destitute, an angry mob of stampeders threatened to lynch Wada, whose story had lured them from Dawson and Circle. Then they marched on Barnette's store. Barnette, expecting trouble, met the mob with a dozen riflemen at his side. Barnette eventually agreed to cut the price of flour by half and dropped the requirement to buy canned goods.

==== Mayor of "an American Dawson" ====
James Wickersham, traveling from Dawson to Fairbanks in March, noted crowds of "stampeders" on the road. Wickersham arrived on April 9 to swear in J. Tod Cowles as the Justice of the Peace. He described the town as "just now in its formation period," with a tent city of 500 people. "Miners, sourdoughs, cheechacos, gamblers, Indians, Negroes, Japanese, dogs, prostitutes, music, drinking! It is rough but healthy & the beginning, I hope, of an American Dawson."

On May 4, 1903, Barnette made a trip to Seattle, where he was commissioned as postmaster of Fairbanks. In San Francisco, he sold a two-thirds interest in Barnette's Cache to the Northern Commercial Company (NCC). Some years later, NCC would purchase the store entirely. Barnette invested the proceeds in the Fairbanks Banking Company.

Lucrative discoveries of gold in Cleary Creek, Fairbanks Creek and Ester Creek created a boom economy. On November 10, 1903, the residents of Fairbanks voted to incorporate. An election was also held for the mayor and city council. Despite winning only 67 votes to John L. Long's 73 votes, Barnette insisted on being named the first mayor of Fairbanks, pressuring the city council until he got his way.

1904 was a landmark year for Barnette and his city. In the summer, Isabelle gave birth to Virginia, their first child. Barnette's Trading Post, only three years old, was demolished to make way for the Northern Commercial Company's expanded store. Barnette initiated the installation of a telephone system. Judge Wickersham, confirmed in his earlier assessment of the settlement, moved the seat of the Third Judicial District from Eagle to Fairbanks. In November, the city's namesake was elected Vice President of the United States.

By 1905, the city had a church (St. Matthew's Episcopal Church), a hospital, and a bridge at Cushman Street spanning the Chena. The Tanana Mines Railway (later, the "Tanana Valley Railway") connected the city with the neighboring settlement at Chena. Barnette purchased the Fairbanks News newspaper. By 1906, gold production had risen to $6,000,000 a year, and with a population which had surpassed 5,000, Fairbanks rivaled Nome as Alaska's largest city.

==== Causten v. Barnette ====
On May 22, 1906, Fairbanks was ravaged by a fire that destroyed most of the buildings. The same year, Barnette was brought to court by James H. Causten, Barnette's backer from 1901. Barnette had not honored his promise to share a third of profits from the venture which in five years had made him a wealthy man. Before the Washington State Supreme Court, Causten demanded a half of the assets Barnette had accumulated since the time of Causten's investment. Barnette protested that Causten was only entitled to one-third of what had been earned or acquired during the first winter at Chenoa City. During proceedings, Barnette's 1886 imprisonment became public. The Fairbanks Daily Times (which had only begun publishing a daily edition that year) ran a banner headline: "EX-CONVICT". On June 26, 1908, the court ruled in favor of Causten, ordering Barnette to pay Causten a third of any assets acquired since he arrived in the Tanana Valley. Among other things, the court observed that “The conduct of appellant Barnette in connection with the suit is not calculated to inspire the greatest confidence.”

==== The Washington-Alaska Bank ====
Barnette purchased the Washington-Alaska Bank in 1909, just as Fairbanks gold production reached its peak. In August 1910, he merged the Fairbanks Banking Company into the Washington-Alaska Bank. Barnette was named the president of the amalgamated bank.

Isabelle Barnette conceived a second child in 1910. Anticipating a difficult birth, she moved to Washington State, where there were better medical facilities. In 1911, a second daughter, Phyllis, was born.

On January 4, 1911, the Washington-Alaska Bank went bankrupt, abruptly closing its doors. Depositors in Fairbanks were out for $1 million. In the dark of March 27, 1911, Barnette fled Fairbanks, taking with him an estimated $500,000 ($10.5 million in 1990 dollars) of dubious provenance. Less than a week later, Barnette was arrested in Los Angeles and charged with embezzling $50,000. The trial took place in Valdez.

In December 1912, Barnette was found not guilty on all accounts except for a misdemeanor charge of falsifying a financial report. Barnette was fined $1,000. Fairbanks Daily News-Miner editor W. F. Thompson called the trial "the rottenest judicial farce the North has ever witnessed." Effigies of Barnette's attorneys were burned at the foot of Cushman Street. Although officially exonerated, Barnette's reputation as a swindler was sealed. Newspapers in the city he had founded took up "Barnette" as a verb meaning "to steal" or "to defraud".

=== Later life and legacy ===
The Barnette family resettled in Los Angeles. In 1918, Isabelle filed for divorce after finding love letters to E.T. from another woman. In 1920, Isabelle was granted custody of the two daughters. E.T. Barnette lived for a time on a palatial estate in Mexico. He died in Los Angeles on May 22, 1933, after injuries sustained in a fall. Isabelle Cleary Barnette died in September 1942 at Agnews State Hospital in San Jose, California.

Barnette Street in Fairbanks is named for E.T. Barnette. The north-south streets of the original Fairbanks townsite were named for the prominent early residents of Fairbanks. The street began at the western edge of Barnette's trading post and ended at the townsite's southern boundaries, where Paul Rickert's farm began. In later years, this southern end of Barnette Street was very near the eastern end of Weeks Field. The development of Bjerremark Subdivision starting in the 1950s extended Barnette Street into South Fairbanks. The two Barnette Streets do not connect, however.

In 1960, E.T. Barnette Elementary School was constructed in Fairbanks, one of several schools built by the Fairbanks Independent School District (the immediate predecessor to today's Fairbanks North Star Borough School District) to handle the population boom in Fairbanks which followed World War II. Isabel Pass in the Alaska Range north of Paxson is named for Isabelle Cleary Barnette.

Barnette is usually remembered by his initials, and there is some doubt about his first name: There are sources which record him as "Eldridge" or "Ebenezer T. Barnette." He appears in some contemporary official documents as "Elbridge T. Barnette". Common folklore in Fairbanks recalls his name as Ezra Thompson Barnette; the name being coaxed from him during a rather drunken argument in one of the many bars in the red light district on present day 1st St.

== Bibliography ==
- Cole, Terrence (1989). E. T. Barnette: The Strange Story of the Man Who Founded Fairbanks. Graphic Arts Center Pub Co. ISBN 0-88240-269-2.
