= Castner Glacier =

Glacier in Alaska

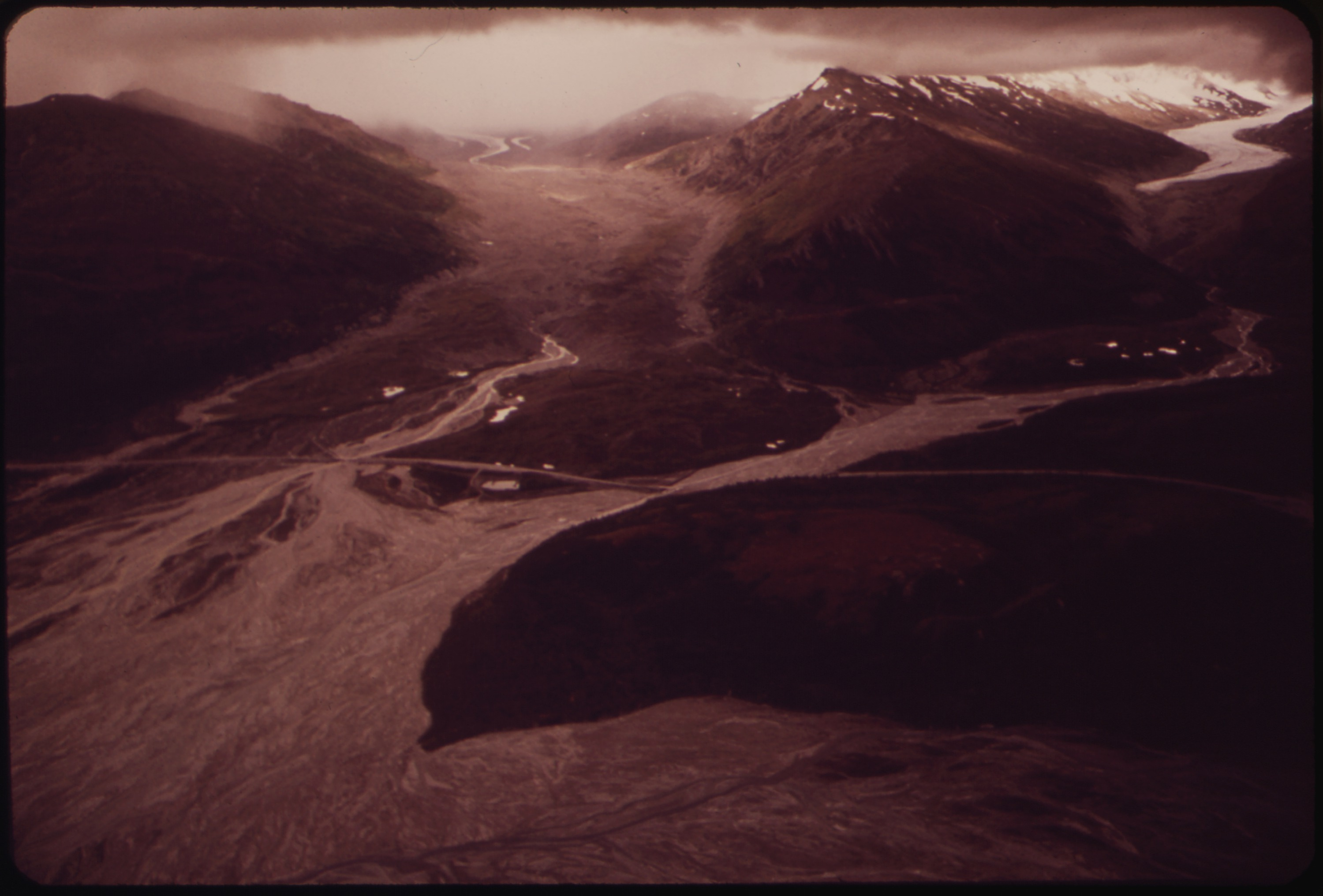
- Castner Glacier (left) photographed by Dennis Cowals in 1973. Canwell Glacier is seen on the far right.

- Location within Alaska
- Interactive map of Castner Glacier
- Type: Valley glacier
- Location: Delta Mountains, Alaska
- Coordinates: 63°27′N 145°29′W
- Length: 12 miles (19 km)
- Terminus: Castner Creek
- Status: Retreating

The Castner Glacier lies on the southern flank of the Delta Range, an eastern section of the Alaska Range. The glacier begins on the peak White Princess and continues to the head of Castner Creek, northwest of Paxson, Alaska. The glacier was named by Edwin Forbes Glenn in 1898 after Joseph Compton Castner.

The glacier is located on Bureau of Land Management land. It is a popular destination for hikers, and is known for its large ice caves.
