= Mount Silvertip =

Mountain in Alaska, United States

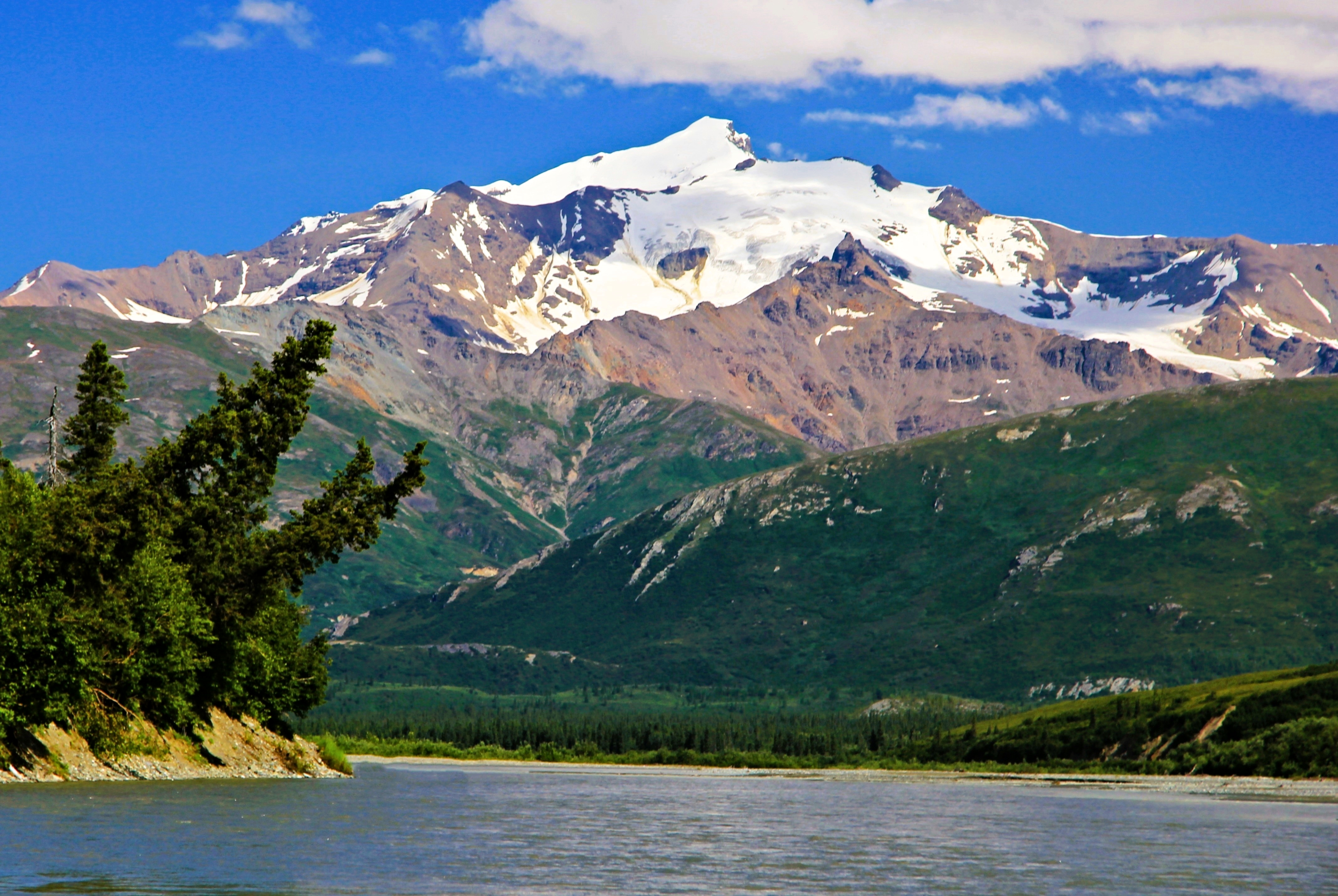
- South aspect

Highest point
- Elevation: 9,400 ft (2,865 m)
- Prominence: 2,556 ft (779 m)
- Parent peak: Black Cap (9,850 ft)
- Isolation: 6.23 mi (10.03 km)
- Coordinates: 63°29′20″N 145°36′35″W

Geography
- Location within Alaska
- Interactive map of Mount Silvertip
- Country: United States
- State: Alaska
- Census Area: Southeast Fairbanks
- Parent range: Alaska Range; Delta Mountains
- Topo map: USGS Mount Hayes B-4

Mount Silvertip is a 9,400-foot-elevation (2,865-meter) mountain summit in Alaska.

== Description ==
Mount Silvertip is located 32 miles (51 km) north of Paxson in the Delta Mountains which are a subrange of the Alaska Range. Precipitation runoff and glacial meltwater from the heavily glaciated mountain's slopes drains into tributaries of the Delta River and Tanana River. Topographic relief is significant as the summit rises 4,400 feet (1,341 meters) above the Jarvis Glacier in two miles (3.2 km) and 7,100 feet (2,164 meters) above the Delta River in 6.5 miles (10.5 km). The mountain's toponym was officially adopted in 1968 by the United States Board on Geographic Names.

== Climate ==
According to the Köppen climate classification system, Mount Silvertip is located in a tundra climate zone with cold, snowy winters, and cool summers. Weather systems are forced upwards by the Delta Mountains (orographic lift), causing heavy precipitation in the form of rainfall and snowfall. Winter temperatures can drop below 0 °F with wind chill factors below −10 °F. This climate supports the Castner Glacier, Riley Creek Glacier, and smaller unnamed glaciers surrounding the peak. The months of March through June offer the most favorable weather for climbing the mountain.

== See also ==
- Geography of Alaska
