= Castner's Cutthroats =

1st Alaskan Combat Intelligence Platoon
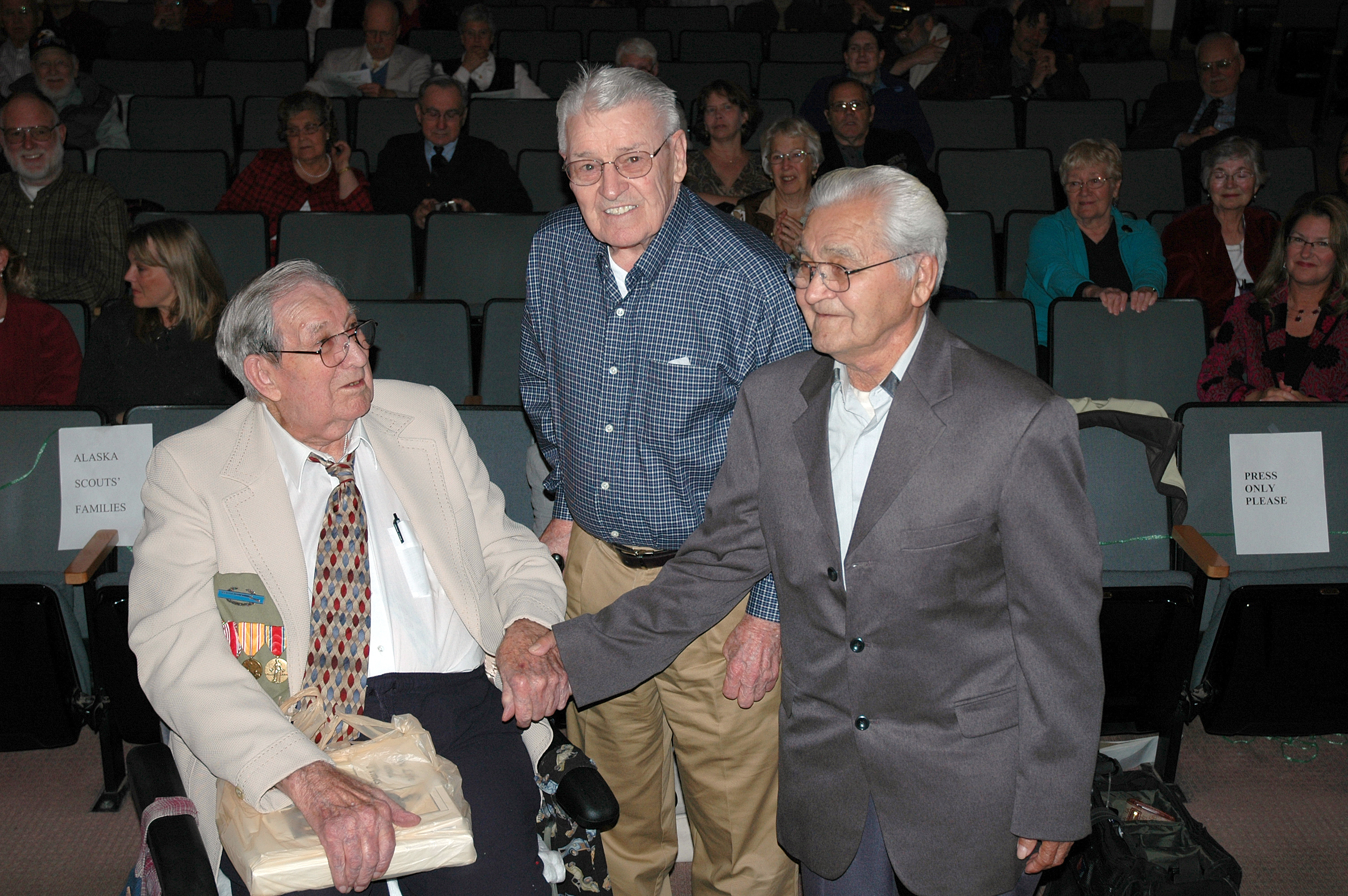
- The last three surviving members of Castner's Cutthroats – Ed Walker (left), Earl Acuff (center), and Billy Buck – at the Anchorage Museum of Natural History in 2008 for an opening of an exhibition. Another surviving member, Alfred A Brattain was alive in Olympia, Wa. at the time of the opening but was inadvertently overlooked when another surviving member said he had died. He died September 21, 2008.
- Active: 1942–45
- Country: United States of America
- Branch: United States Army
- Type: Reconnaissance platoon
- Size: 65 personnel
- Nicknames: "Castner's Cutthroats"; "Alaskan Scouts"
- Engagements: World War II: Aleutian Islands Campaign

Commanders
- Notable commanders: Lawrence Varsi Castner

Castner's Cutthroats was the unofficial name for the 1st Alaskan Combat Intelligence Platoon (Provisional), also known as Alaskan Scouts. Castner's Cutthroats fought during World War II and were instrumental in defeating the Japanese during the Aleutian Islands Campaign. The unit was composed of just sixty-five men selected to perform reconnaissance missions in the Aleutian Islands during the war.

== Background ==
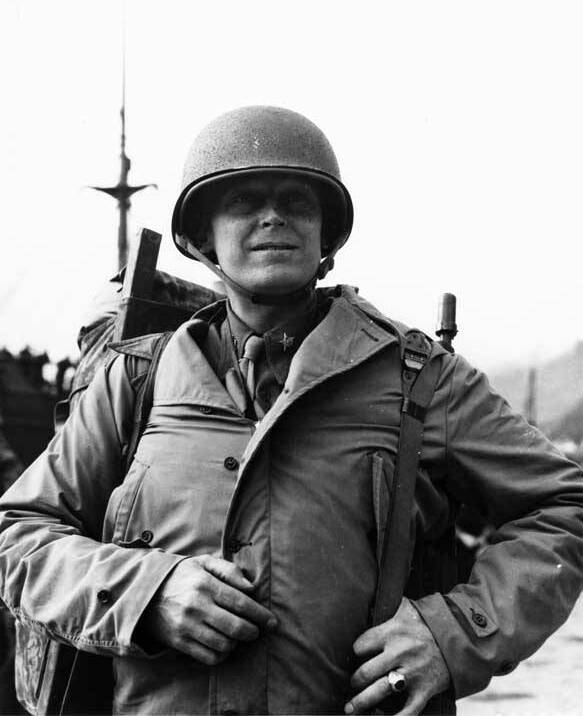
Colonel Lawrence V. Castner (1943)

The unit was the idea of Colonel Lawrence Varsi Castner (1902–49), an Army intelligence officer serving in General Simon Bolivar Buckner's Alaska Defense Command, and was organized to create a unit that was functional with minimal outfitting. Castner chose men skilled in the conditions of the Alaskan wilderness, including the native Aleuts and Eskimos, sourdough prospectors, hunters, trappers and fishermen. Their background in survival and hunting made them suitable as scouts. Castner did not enforce standard military procedures on his unit, and they were given freedom in their operations. The name "Castner's Cutthroats" was given by the military press during the war, but the name preferred by the men was Alaska Scouts.

The commanding officer chosen to lead Castner's Cutthroats was Captain Robert H. Thompson, a Montana State University football star from Moccasin, Montana. Thompson was hugely popular with his men and developed a deep love of Alaska. After leaving the Castner's Cutthroats, he stayed in Alaska as a guide, hunter and bush pilot until his accidental death in 1955.

He was joined in early 1942 by Lt. Earl C. Acuff, a University of Idaho graduate and rival football player. Acuff had been stationed on a remote Aleutian island to spy on Japanese planes. After several months went by without hearing from him, the army charged Castner's Cutthroats with recovery of his body. When they found him alive and well, he was quickly transferred to the Alaskan Scouts.

I was living like a king. I was diving for king crab and eating fresh seafood and fowl – wild ptarmigan, ducks and geese – for dinner. They told me not to break radio sound unless I saw a Japanese plane, so I didn't. When the Alaskan Scouts came to 'rescue' me, they started thinking that maybe they'd like to stay with me.

— Lt Acuff

== Mission ==
In June 1942, the Japanese bombed Dutch Harbor and landed troops on the western Aleutian Islands of Kiska and Attu, which were quickly occupied within a few days. Reacting to the Japanese occupation, Ephriam D. Dickson III of the Field Museums Branch for the U.S. Army Center of Military History wrote that the American public and leaders were "concerned that Japan might use these islands to launch air raids against the Pacific Northwest, especially targeting the Boeing bomber plant and Bremerton Navy Yard in Seattle".

Castner's Cutthroats were selected to head reconnaissance missions and helped plan landing zones for amphibious assaults on the Japanese-held occupied islands. During the American counterattack, Castner's Cutthroats main mission was to serve as guides and messengers for the U.S. Army. However, when battle preparations were being made to invade Attu and Kiska, they warned the Army that wheeled vehicles would not function on the permafrost and the soldiers would need to be outfitted with warm gear and plenty of food, a warning that was largely ignored. Consequently, many soldiers owed their lives to Castner's Cutthroats for protecting them from the weather and providing them with food.

=== Adak Island landing strip ===
One of the major successes of Castner's Cutthroats was the building of an airfield on Adak Island. The U.S. Army Air Forces had lost several planes, not to the Japanese, but to Alaskan weather. In order to shorten the distance between the Japanese and American air bases, an airfield on Adak Island was proposed and Castner's Cutthroats were sent in to scout for a suitable location. Due to the mountainous terrain of the area, no acceptable site was available. Instead, Castner's Cutthroats dammed a lagoon and drained it to use the sandy bottom floor as a temporary landing strip. Engineers later came in and improved the area.

== Equipment ==
Standard issue for Castner's Cutthroats was a Trapper Nelson pack, hunting knife, .22LR caliber target pistol and a sniper rifle, instead of the standard issue Springfield rifle, or M1 Garand. However, when it came to firearms, personal preference was the deciding factor. Al Brattain, a crack shot, preferred the M1 Garand because its reduced recoil did not spoil his aim. Trapper Nelson packs held all their supplies for their long mountainous treks. They lived off the land, which allowed them to stay light, unlike most military units of the time. To move from island to island, the men used canoes, from which they fished for salmon. The salmon was dried and stored for the winter, furthering the unit's ability to stay out in the field.

== Memorial ==
In Kuluk Bay, Alaska, the Cutthroats staged a reconnaissance mission. At the spot on the beach where they first came ashore, a plaque has been erected which reads:

On August 28, 1942, the U.S. Naval submarines, USS Triton and USS Tuna, surfaced 4 miles due east of this beach and disembarked a 37-man U.S. Army intelligence-gathering unit led by Colonel Lawrence V. Castner. The unit was known as "The Alaska Scouts", or more affectionately as "Castner's Cutthroats." Their mission was to gather information about the Japanese troop strength on Adak and to report their findings to the landing force already on its way from Dutch Harbor. No enemy troops were found, and on August 30, a 17-ship landing force with 4,500 men and tons of heavy equipment arrived. Their mission: to build an airstrip and troop staging area in preparation for the retaking of the enemy-occupied Aleutian Islands of Attu and Kiska."

== Aftermath ==
Castner retired from the military towards the end of World War II and remained in Alaska. After spending a year as a vice-president of the fledgling Alaska Airlines, he founded a cold storage and wholesaling business in Anchorage, and was regarded as an up-and-coming leader of the local business community. This would prove to be short-lived, as Castner died in December 1949. A short street in Anchorage, located near the KENI Radio Building, is named for him.

William "Billy" Buck, one of the last three surviving members of Castner's Cutthroats, died on 1 August 2011 in Anchorage, Alaska at the age of 90.

Ed Walker died shortly after Buck on 28 October 2011, at the age of 94, also in Anchorage, Alaska.

Earl C. Acuff was the last surviving member of the Cutthroats. He died on 13 February 2013, at the age of 94 in Blacksburg, Virginia.

== See also ==
- Alaska Territorial Guard
