= Gakona River =

- Location of the mouth of the Gakona River in Alaska

Location
- Country: United States
- State: Alaska
- Census Area: Copper River

Physical characteristics
- Source: Gakona Glacier
  - location: Alaska Range
  - coordinates: 63°09′49″N 145°12′21″W
  - elevation: 3,846 ft (1,172 m)
- Mouth: Copper River
  - location: Gakona, 16 miles (26 km) northeast of Glennallen
  - coordinates: 62°17′58″N 145°18′52″W
  - elevation: 1,411 ft (430 m)
- Length: 64 mi (103 km)

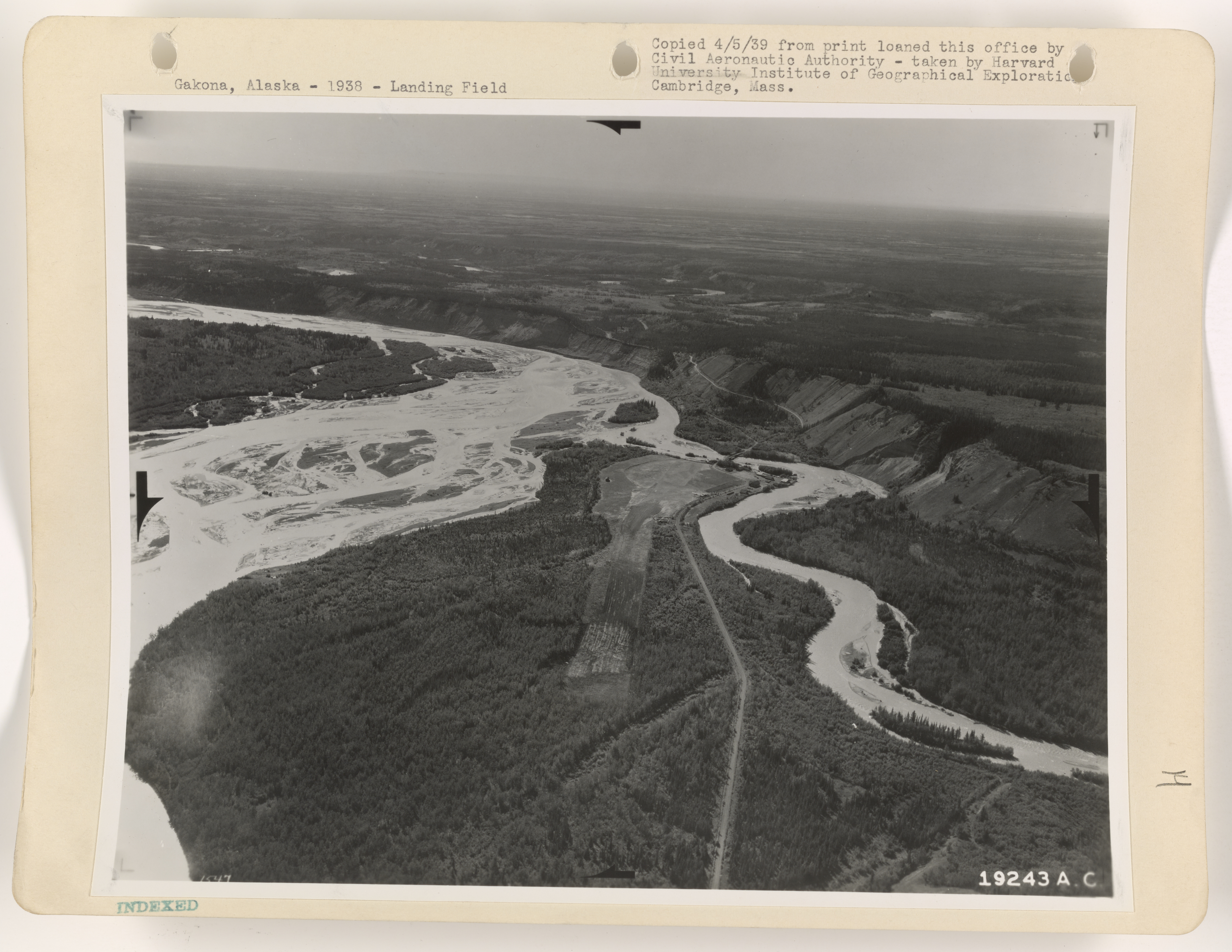
Gakona River

The Gakona River is a 64-mile (103 km) tributary of the Copper River in the U.S. state of Alaska. Beginning at Gakona Glacier on Mount Gakona in the Alaska Range, it flows generally south to meet the larger river at the community of Gakona.

== See also ==
- List of rivers of Alaska
