= Black Rapids Roadhouse =

- Rapids Roadhouse
- U.S. National Register of Historic Places
- Alaska Heritage Resources Survey
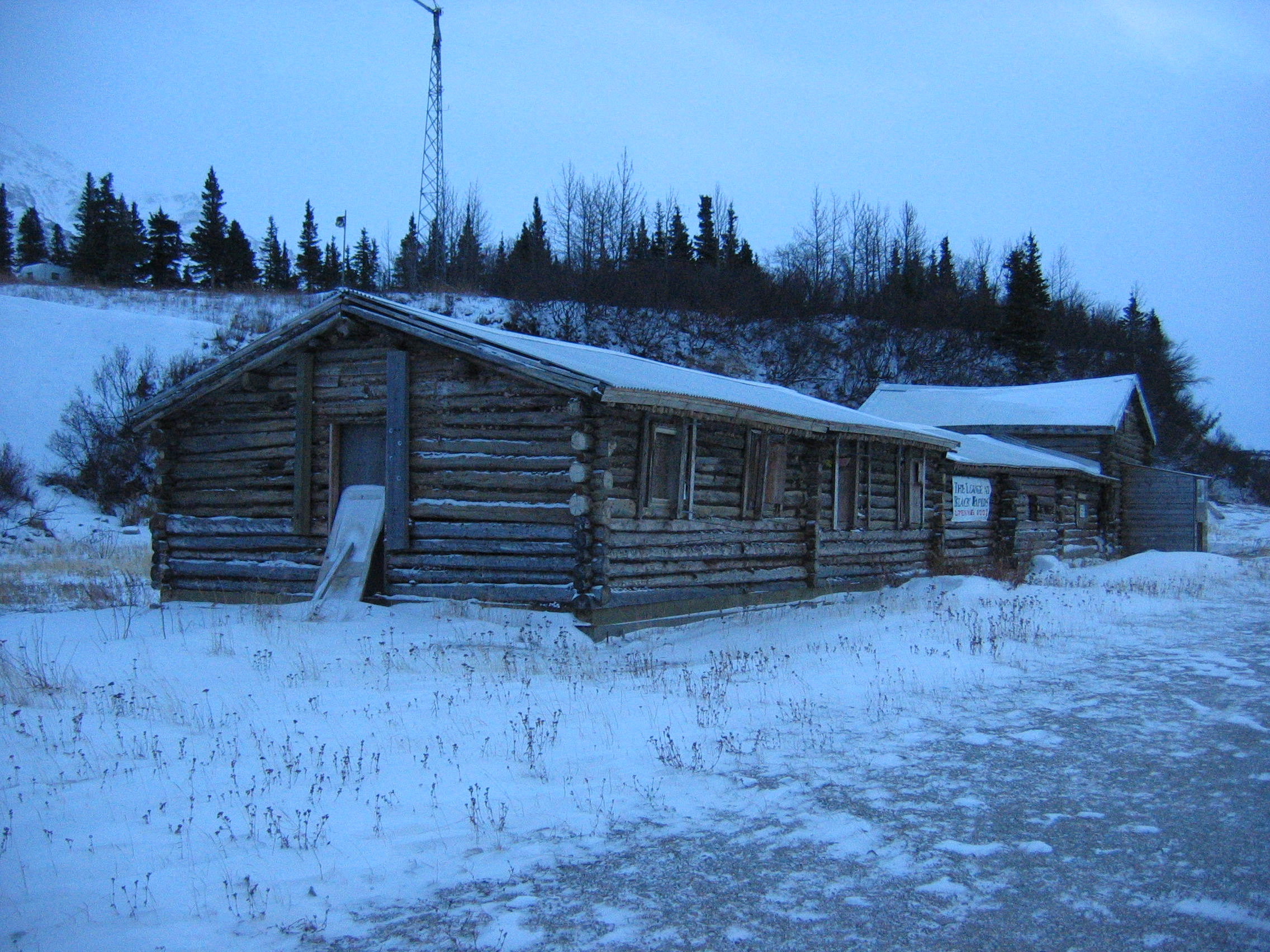
- A south facing photo of the roadhouse.

- Location within Alaska
- Location: Mile 227.4 of Richardson Highway, about 35 miles (56 km) south of Delta Junction
- Nearest city: Delta Junction
- Coordinates: 63°31′46″N 145°51′31″W
- Area: less than one acre
- Built: 1902
- NRHP reference No.: 01000021
- AHRS No.: XMH-00223
- Added to NRHP: February 2, 2001

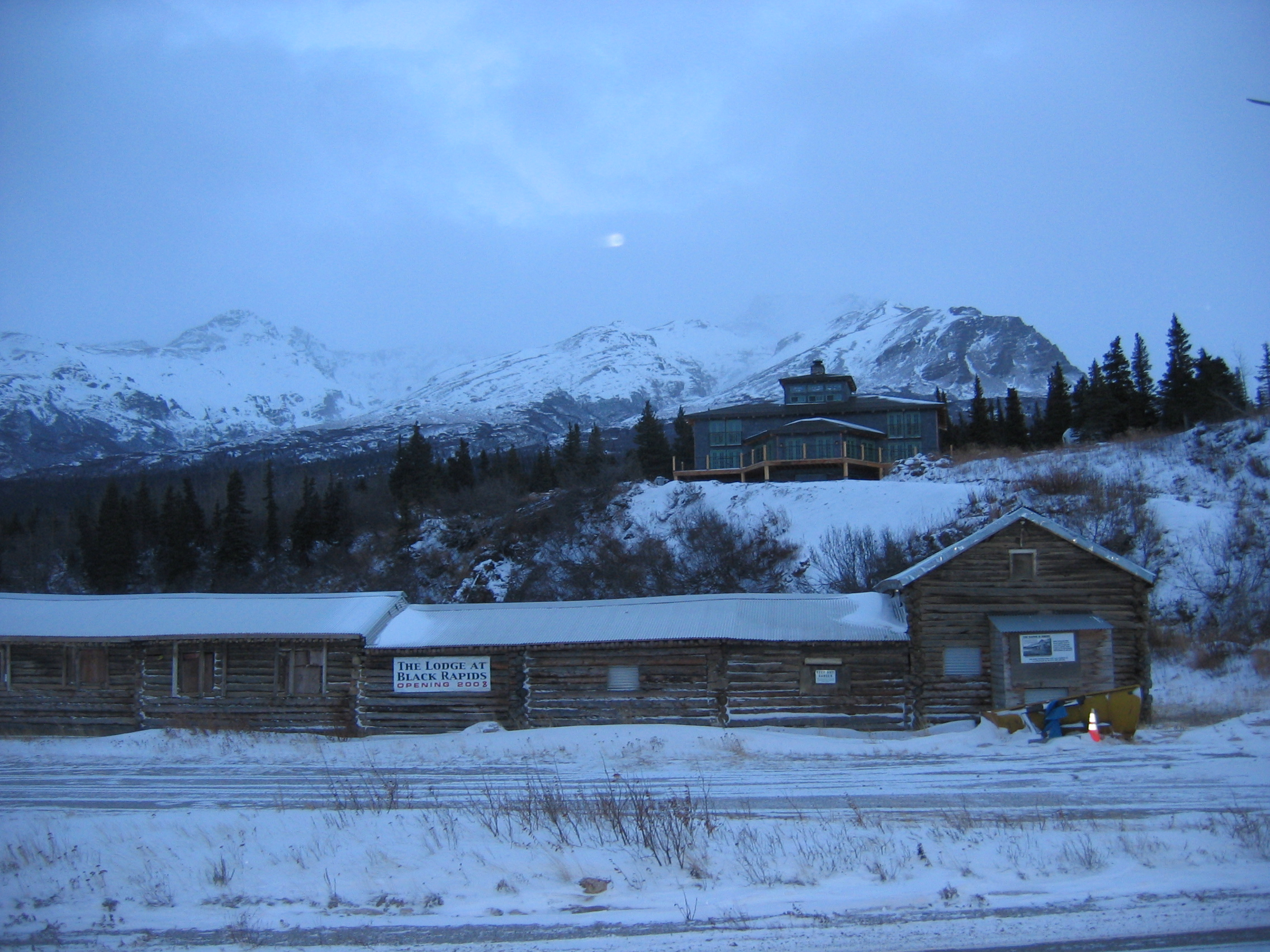
An east facing photo of the roadhouse with the new lodge visible in the background.

The Black Rapids Roadhouse, also known as the Rapids Roadhouse and the Rapids Hunting Lodge, is a historic Alaskan structure along the Richardson Highway in east-central Alaska. It was built in 1902. Construction of the Alaska Railroad led to a decline in the 1920s, but the original roadhouse continued to operate until 1993. A new, modern lodge was built near the roadhouse in 2001 and the original building is preserved as a historical curiosity and tourist attraction.

The original roadhouse was listed on the National Register of Historic Places in 2001.

== Black Rapids Glacier ==
Black Rapids Roadhouse is across the Delta River from the Black Rapids Glacier. For three months in 1937 the Black Rapids Glacier made national news by advancing across the valley at the rate of a mile a month-it was known as the "galloping glacier." The 27-mile (43 km) long glacier has since retreated, but the moraine can still be seen from Richardson Highway pullout.

== History ==
The Rapids Roadhouse, variously known as Black Rapids Roadhouse or Rapids Hunting Lodge, opened at least by 1904 to serve travelers on the new Valdez-Fairbanks Trail. Of more than thirty roadhouses that operated along the route between 1902 and 1923, Rapids Roadhouse is one of the few that survive. Rapids Roadhouse continued to operate until 1993, although its peak years had been during the first decades of the 20th century. Because of this, period of significance ended in 1923.

== See also ==
- National Register of Historic Places listings in Southeast Fairbanks Census Area, Alaska
