= Gulkana Glacier =

Glacier in the state of Alaska

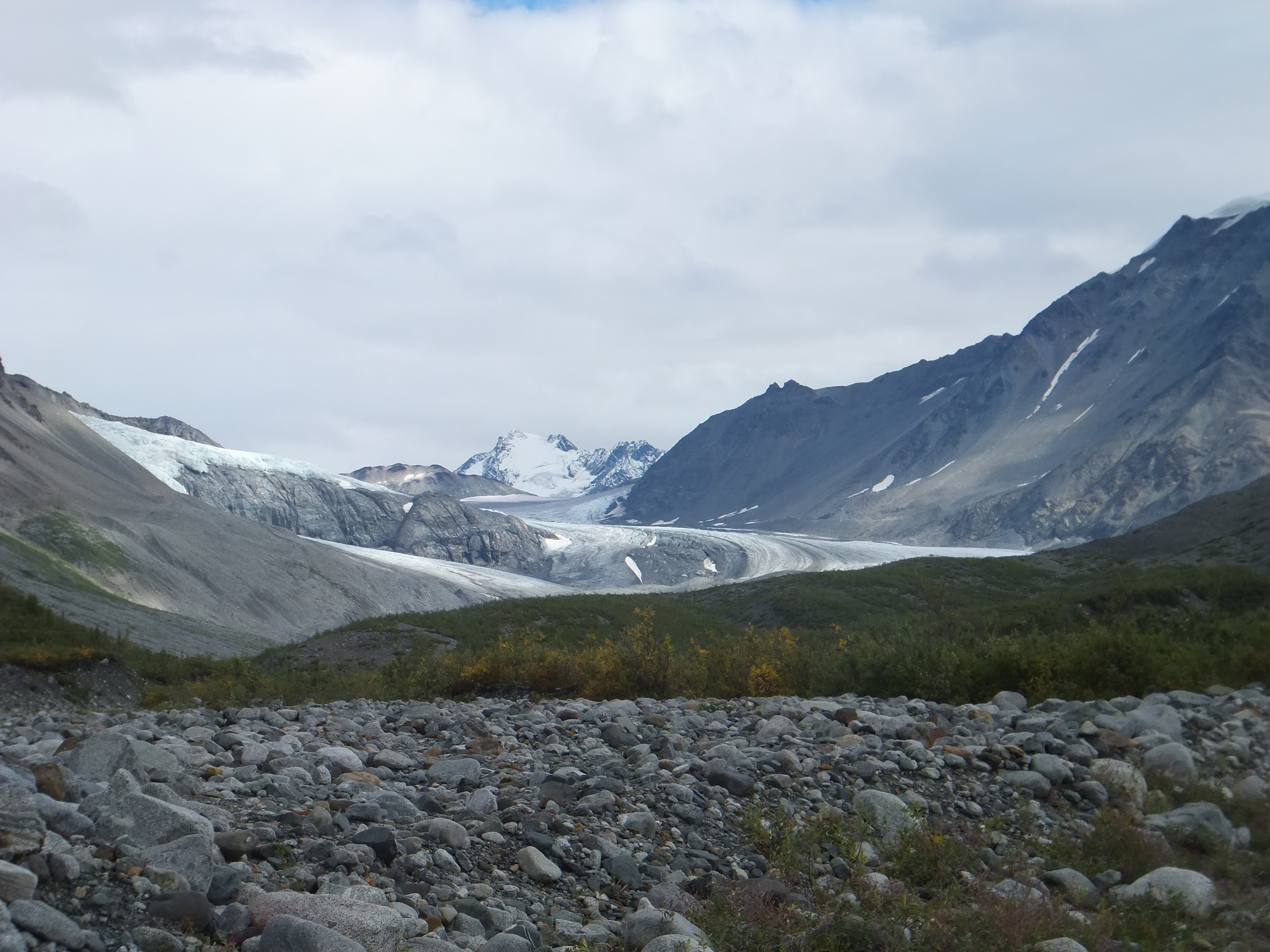
- View from southwest of the glacier (August, 2013).

- Location within Alaska
- Interactive map of Gulkana Glacier
- Location: Location in Alaska range, US
- Coordinates: 63°14′27″N 145°28′3″W
- Area: 15 km^{2} (5.8 sq mi)
- Status: retreating

Gulkana Glacier is a glacier that flows from the ice fields of the south flank of the eastern Alaska Range. It is accessible by gravel roads from the Richardson Highway near mile post 197 at the Richardson Monument, just two miles north of Summit Lake and 12 miles north of Paxson and the junction with Denali Highway. Closer to the glacier, a suspension bridge allows pedestrians to cross over Phelan Creek. Wildlife includes moose and bears. The peak of a hill just southwest of Gulkana Glacier has a post labeled PEWE 1975. The Arctic Man competition takes place near Gulkana Glacier every spring.

== Geology ==
Gulkana Glacier is one of three detailed long-term glacier monitoring sites run by the USGS in a study on climate change and glacier-related hydrologic processes. Wolverine Glacier and South Cascade Glacier are the other two monitoring sites. The study monitors climate, glacial movement, glacial runoff, glacier mass-balance, and stream runoff.

Since 1966 when the USGS began collecting annual mass balance data, the mass of Gulkana Glacier has been decreasing by 0.4 meters per year on average. In addition, the motion of the ice has slowed, which has resulted in glacier retreat. The glacier enjoys a peak thickness in May or June which is 2 to 5 meters thicker than its minimum in August or September.

The USGS Phelan Creek near Paxson stream-gaging station is located at an altitude of 1,125 meters above sea level and one kilometer downstream from the glacier's 1996 terminus. The creek bed contains gravel and boulders of various sizes, typical of a glacial moraine.

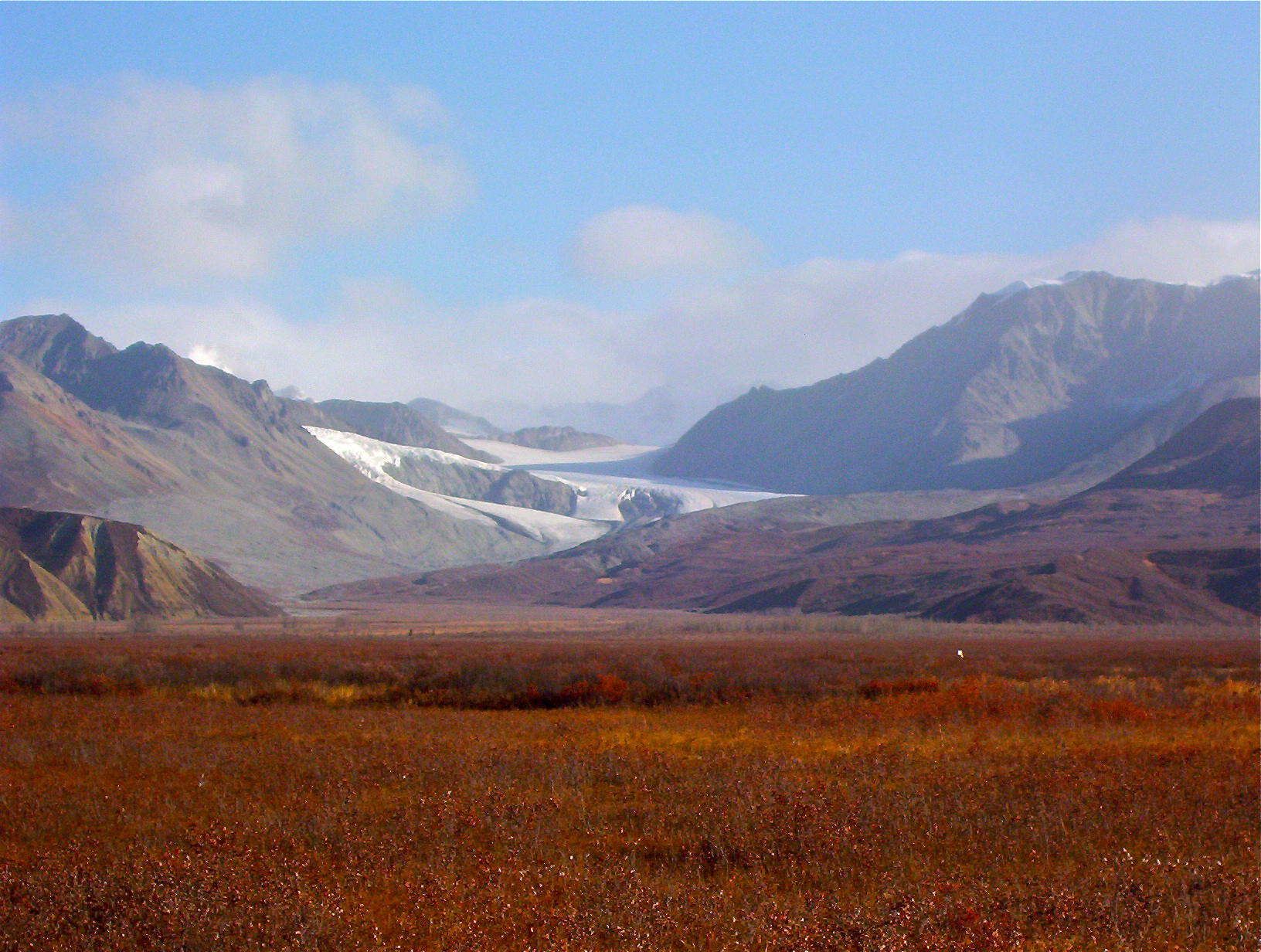
Gulkana Glacier seen from Isabel Pass, about 12 miles north of Paxson, Alaska in September, 2010.

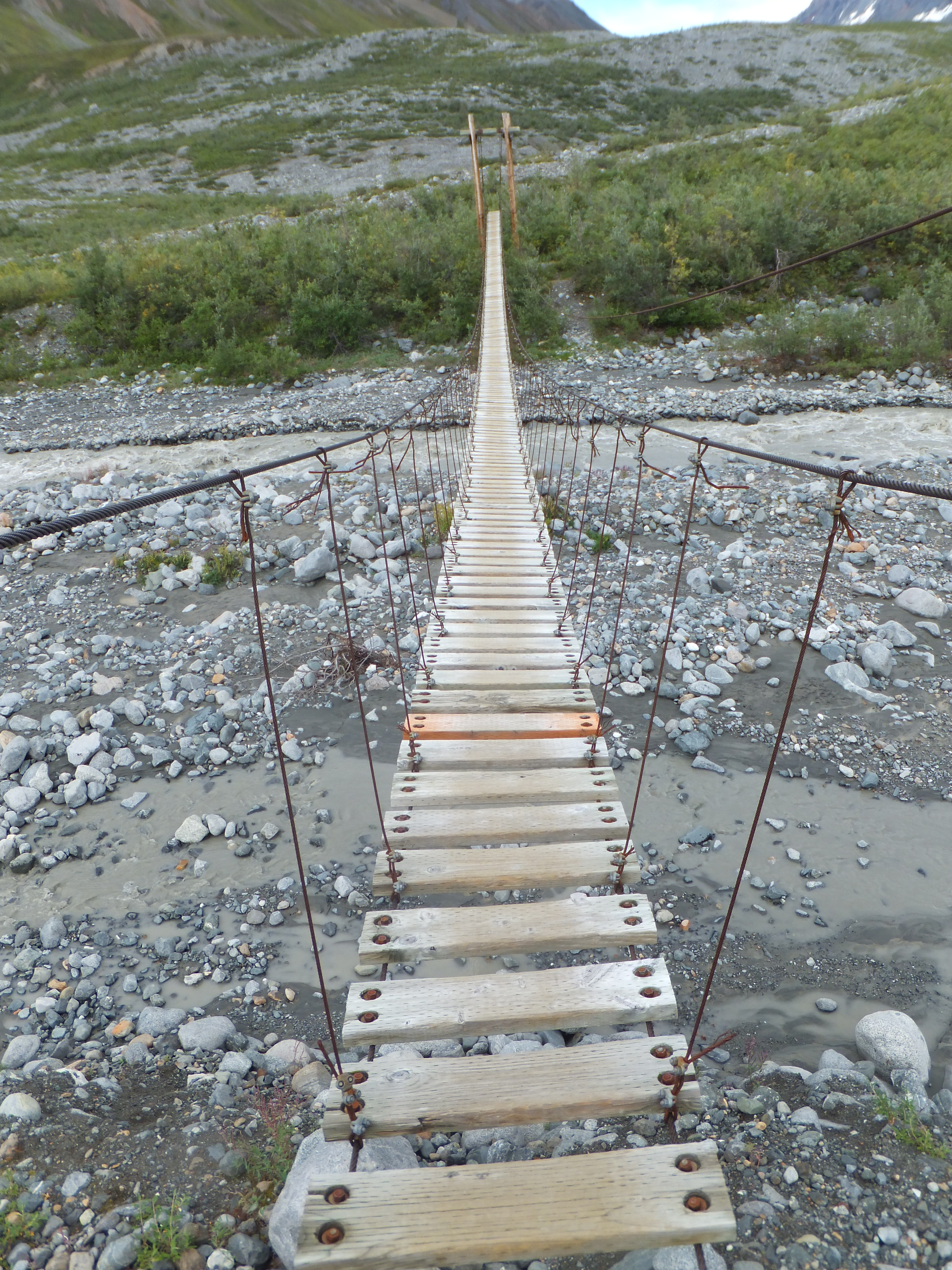
Suspension Bridge over College Creek.

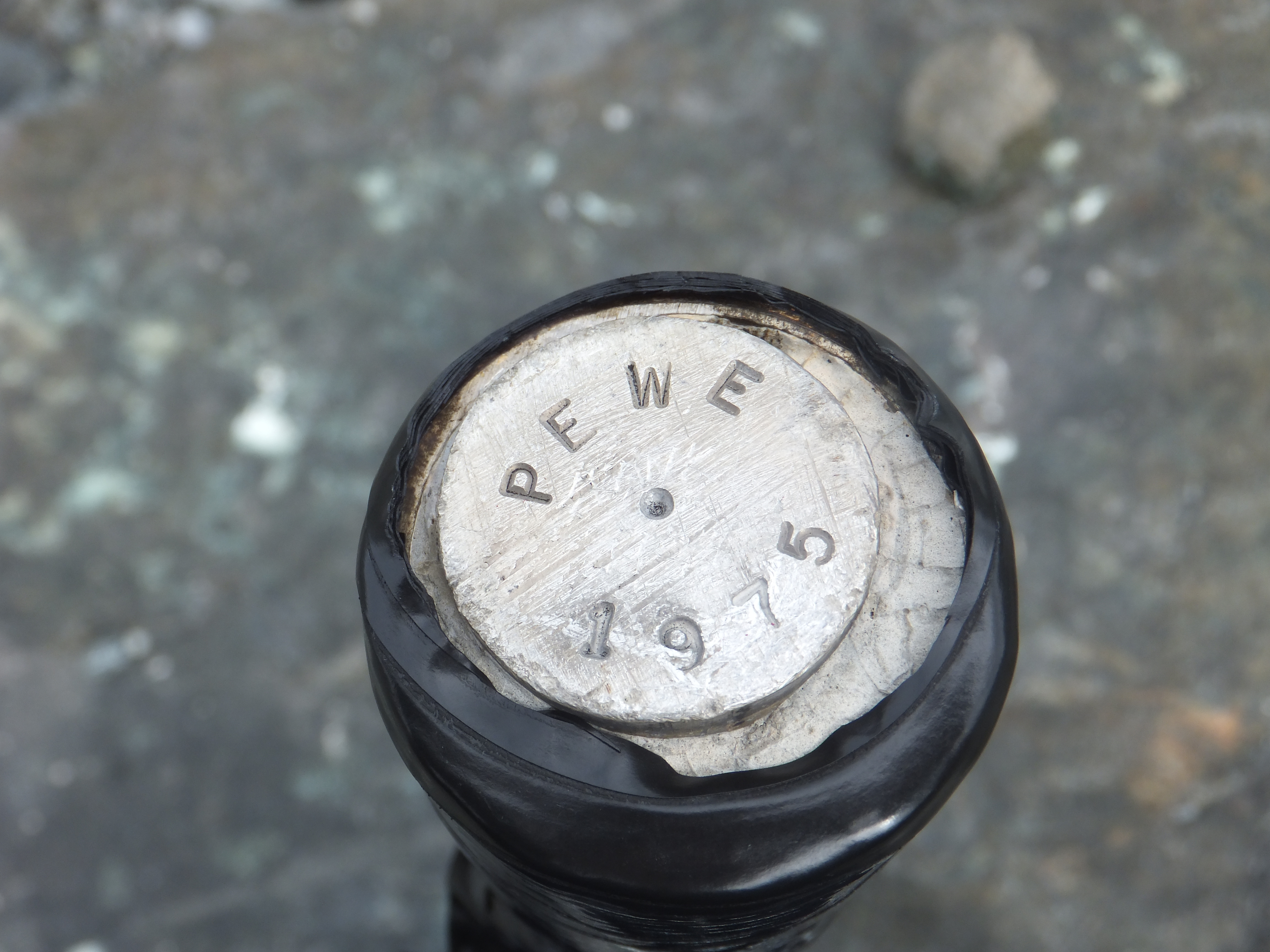
A post labeled "PEWE 1975" marks a hill just southwest of Gulkana Glacier.
