= Gulkana River =

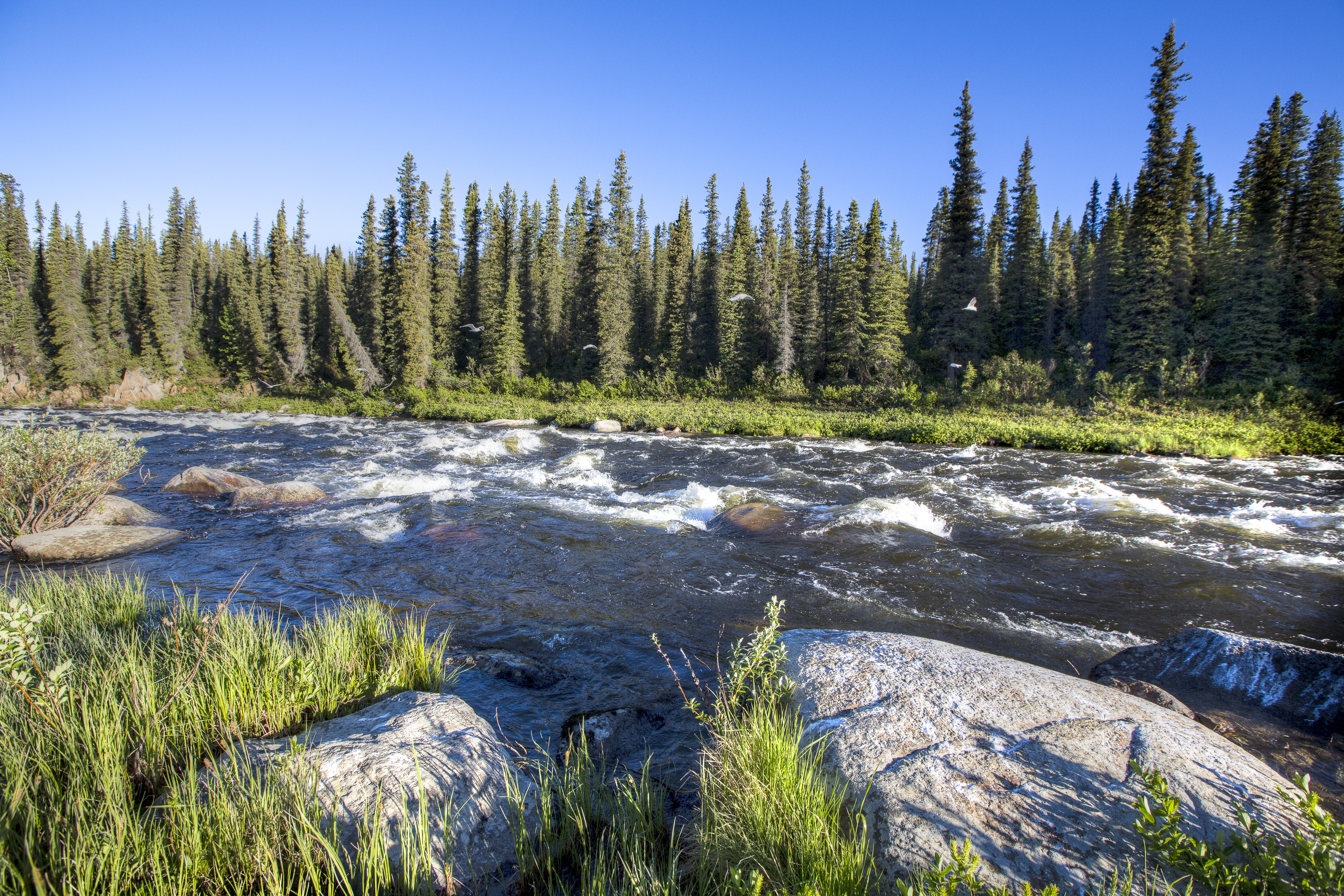
- Gulkana River

- Location of the mouth of the Gulkana River in Alaska

Location
- Country: United States
- State: Alaska
- Census Area: Southeast Fairbanks, Copper River

Physical characteristics
- Source: Summit Lake
  - location: Alaska Range, Southeast Fairbanks Census Area
  - coordinates: 63°14′29″N 145°28′03″W
  - elevation: 3,806 ft (1,160 m)
- Mouth: Copper River
  - location: 9 miles (14 km) northeast of Glennallen, Copper River Census Area
  - coordinates: 62°13′15″N 145°23′34″W
  - elevation: 1,302 ft (397 m)
- Length: 60 mi (97 km)
- Basin size: 2,140 sq mi (5,500 km^{2})

National Wild and Scenic River
- Type: Wild 181.0 miles (291.3 km)
- Designated: December 2, 1980

The Gulkana River is a 60-mile (97 km) tributary of the Copper River in the U.S. state of Alaska. Beginning near the southeastern end of Summit Lake in the Alaska Range, the river flows generally south to meet the larger river 9 miles (14 km) northeast of Glennallen. The Richardson Highway and the Trans-Alaska Pipeline run north–south, nearby and roughly parallel to the Gulkana River. Slightly south of Summit Lake the river passes under the east–west Denali Highway near its junction with the Richardson Highway at Paxson.

== "Wild" segments ==
A total of 181 miles (291 km) of streams in the Gulkana River watershed were designated "wild" and added to the National Wild and Scenic Rivers System in 1980. This included the 47 miles (76 km) of the main stem between Paxson Lake and Sourdough. The other designated segments included the north and south branches of the West Fork Gulkana River, the West Fork itself, and the Middle Fork Gulkana River from Dickey Lake to the fork's mouth on the main stem. The federal Bureau of Land Management administers the "wild" river segments and their surrounds.

== Recreation ==
The Gulkana River watershed, which includes many clearwater lakes and streams, "has one of Alaska's most productive and popular grayling fisheries...", according to Alaska Fishing. Accessible by highway, airplane, boat, and foot trails, the Gulkana system supports large populations of king and red salmon, rainbow trout, and lake trout as well as Arctic grayling. The river flows through wild country affording views of the Wrangell Mountains. Visitor services are available along the Richardson Highway.

The main stem and some of its tributaries are popular with boaters of various skill levels. Depending on which segments are being run, floats on these streams vary from Class I (easy) to IV (very difficult) on the International Scale of River Difficulty.

A float trip down the main stem of the Gulkana may take four or five days Trips starting on the forks may take much longer, depending on the chosen route. Put-in and take-out places along the main stem from source to mouth include Paxson Lake, Paxson Lake Campground, Sourdough Campground, Poplar Grove Campground, and the Richardson Highway Bridge at Gakona.

Floats on the Middle Fork Gulkana River usually start at the Delta National Wild and Scenic River Wayside along the Denali Highway and include lake segments and portages near the headwaters. It is also possible to take a floatplane to Dickey Lake and start from there. The West Fork Gulkana River and its two branches are also runnable but difficult to reach and navigate. In particular, portages on the South Branch route, which includes lakes and a segment of the Tyone River, are "arduous". Hazards on these streams include Canyon Rapids, rated Class III to IV (difficult to very difficult) on the main stem, isolation, cold water, logjams, overhanging or submerged vegetation, portages of varying difficulty, and powerboats on the lower river.

== See also ==
- List of rivers of Alaska
