= Delta Mountains =

Subrange of the Alaska Range

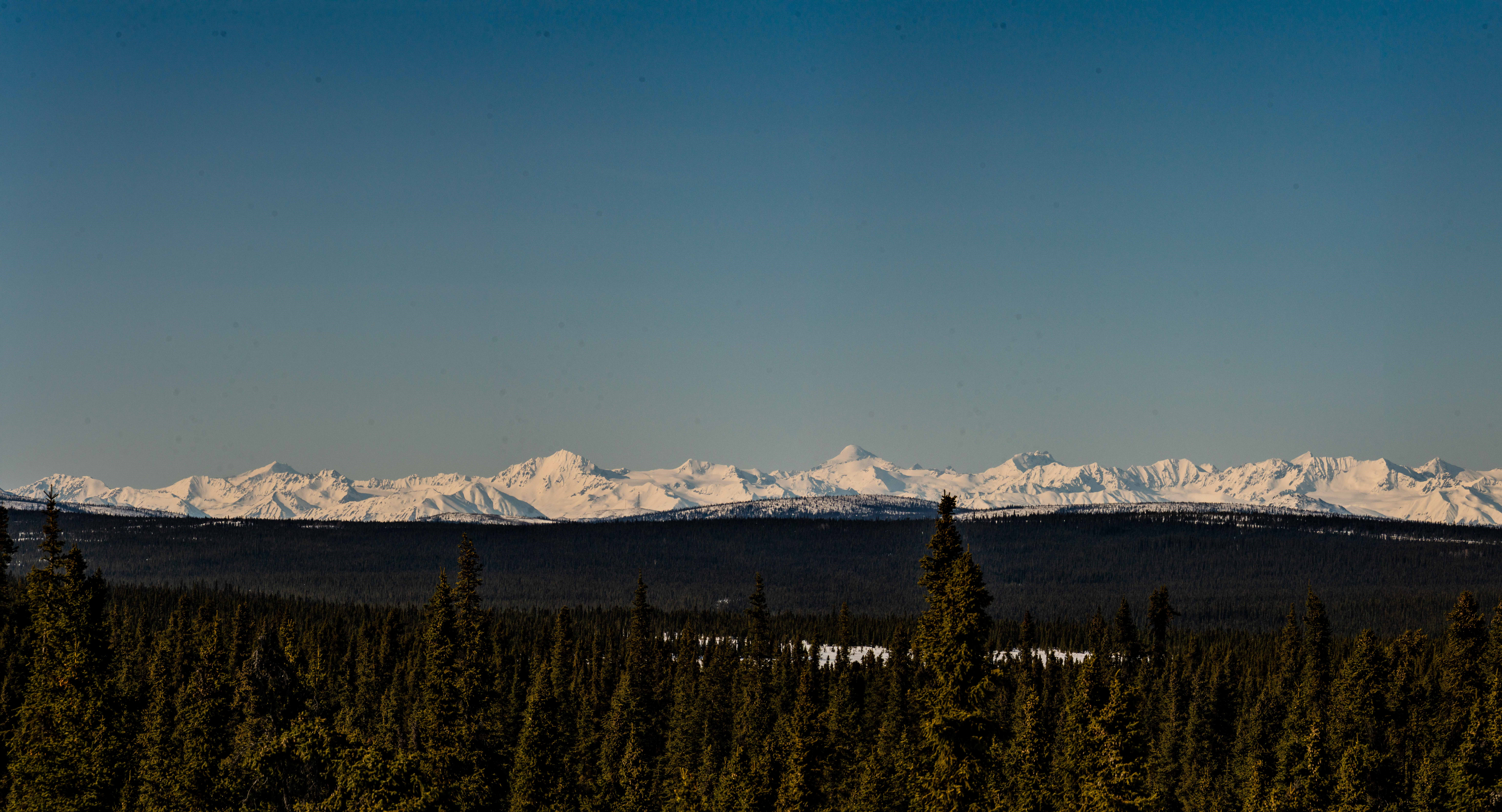
- The Delta Mountains, as seen from the south

Highest point
- Peak: Mount Kimball
- Elevation: 10,300 ft (3,100 m)
- Coordinates: 63°16′20″N 144°55′30″W

Dimensions
- Length: 95 mi (153 km)

Geography
- Location within Alaska
- Country: United States
- Region: Alaska

The Delta Mountains or Delta Range are a subrange of the Alaska Range, forming its eastern terminus. The mountains extend about 95 miles (153 km) from east to west, to the south of the Tanana River Valley, west of the Nebesna River and northwest of Wrangell-St. Elias National Park and the Copper River, and cover an area of 6,313 square miles (16,350 km^{2}). The highest point of the range is Mount Kimball, at 10,300 feet (3,100 m).

The Delta River originates on the south side of the range, near Paxson, and flows north through the mountains (between the Delta Mountains and the Hayes Range, to the west) to join the Tanana River. It has been designated a National Wild and Scenic River since 1980.

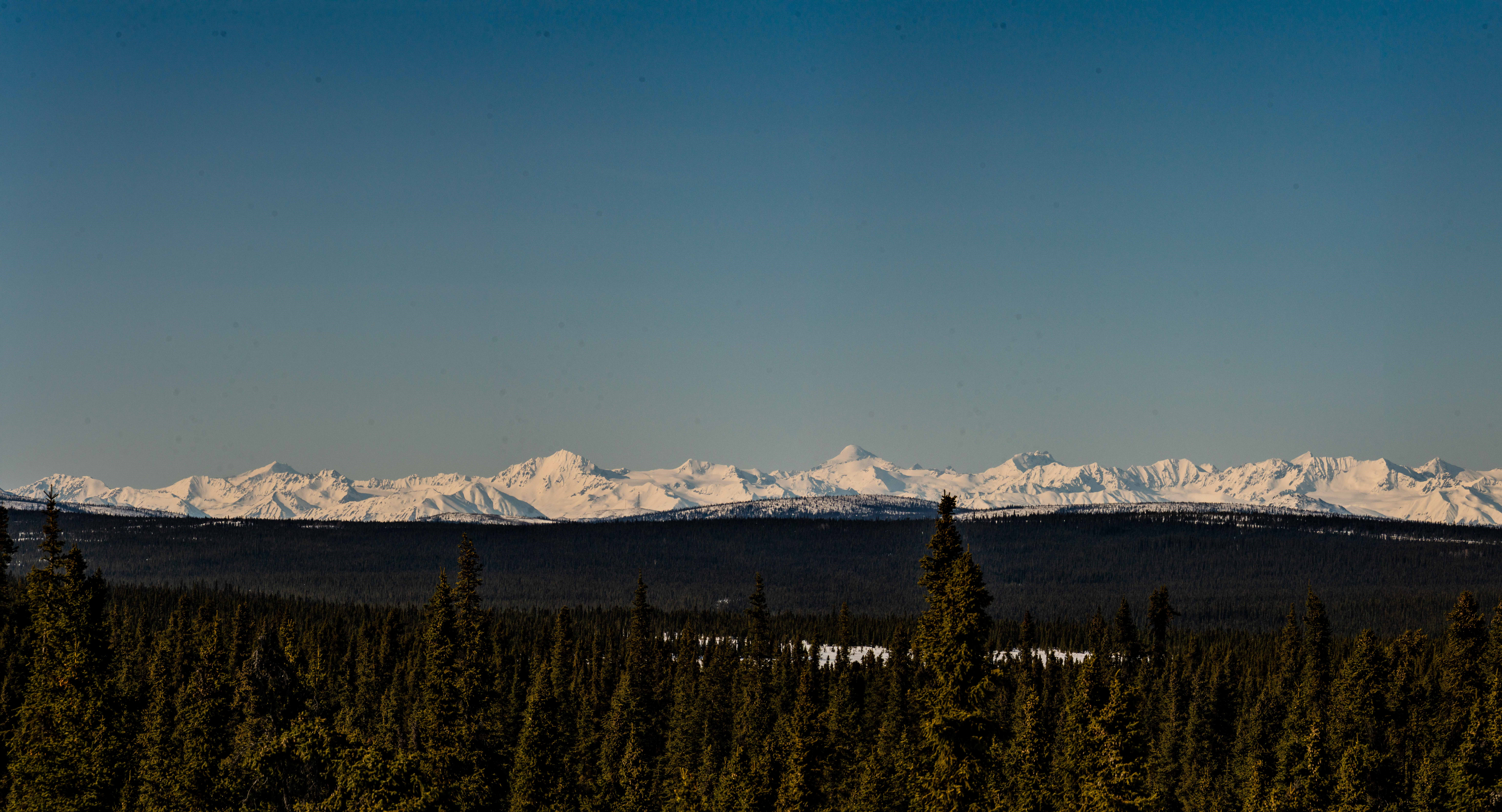
Delta peaks from Richardson Highway, south. Skyline from left to right: Rainbow, McCallum, Silvertip, Institute, Minya, White Princess, Snow White. April 19, 2024

== See also ==
- Mount Gakona
- Mount Silvertip
