= Lawrence V. Castner =

American fencer

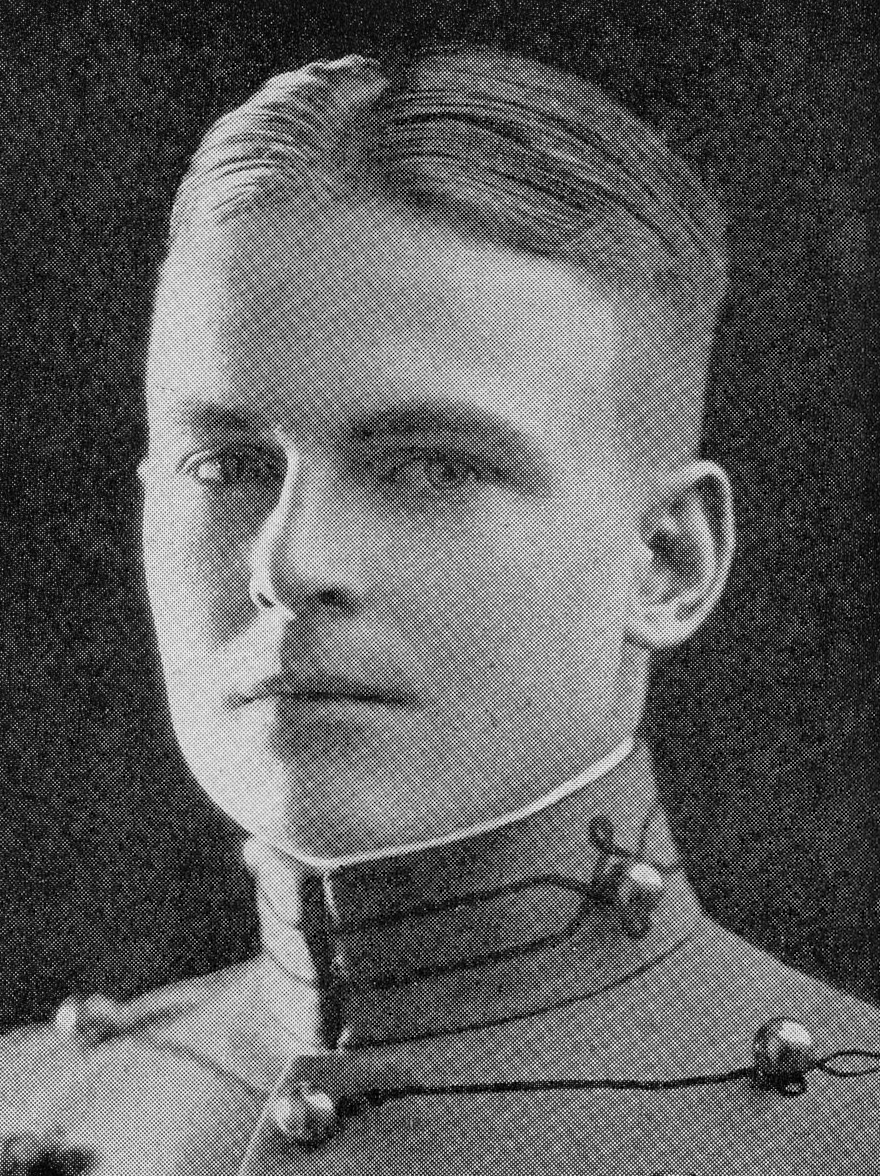
- At West Point in 1923

Personal information
- Full name: Lawrence Varsi Castner
- Born: May 1, 1902 San Francisco, California, United States
- Died: December 7, 1949 (aged 47) Oakland, California, United States

Sport
- Sport: Fencing
- College team: West Point Military Academy Class of 1923

Lawrence Varsi Castner (May 1, 1902 – December 7, 1949) was an American businessman, fencer and military officer. He competed in the individual and team sabre events at the 1924 Summer Olympics. His greatest acclaim came during World War II, when he led a unit known as Castner's Cutthroats in Alaska.

== Biography ==
Lawrence V. Castner was born in San Francisco on May 1, 1902. He is the son of Major General Joseph Compton Castner. He graduated from the United States Military Academy at West Point in 1923.

For his service in Alaska, he earned the Distinguished Service Medal and the Legion of Merit.

He died at his mother's home in Oakland, California on December 7, 1949, after a long illness, and was buried at San Francisco National Cemetery.
