= Joseph Compton Castner =

United States Army general

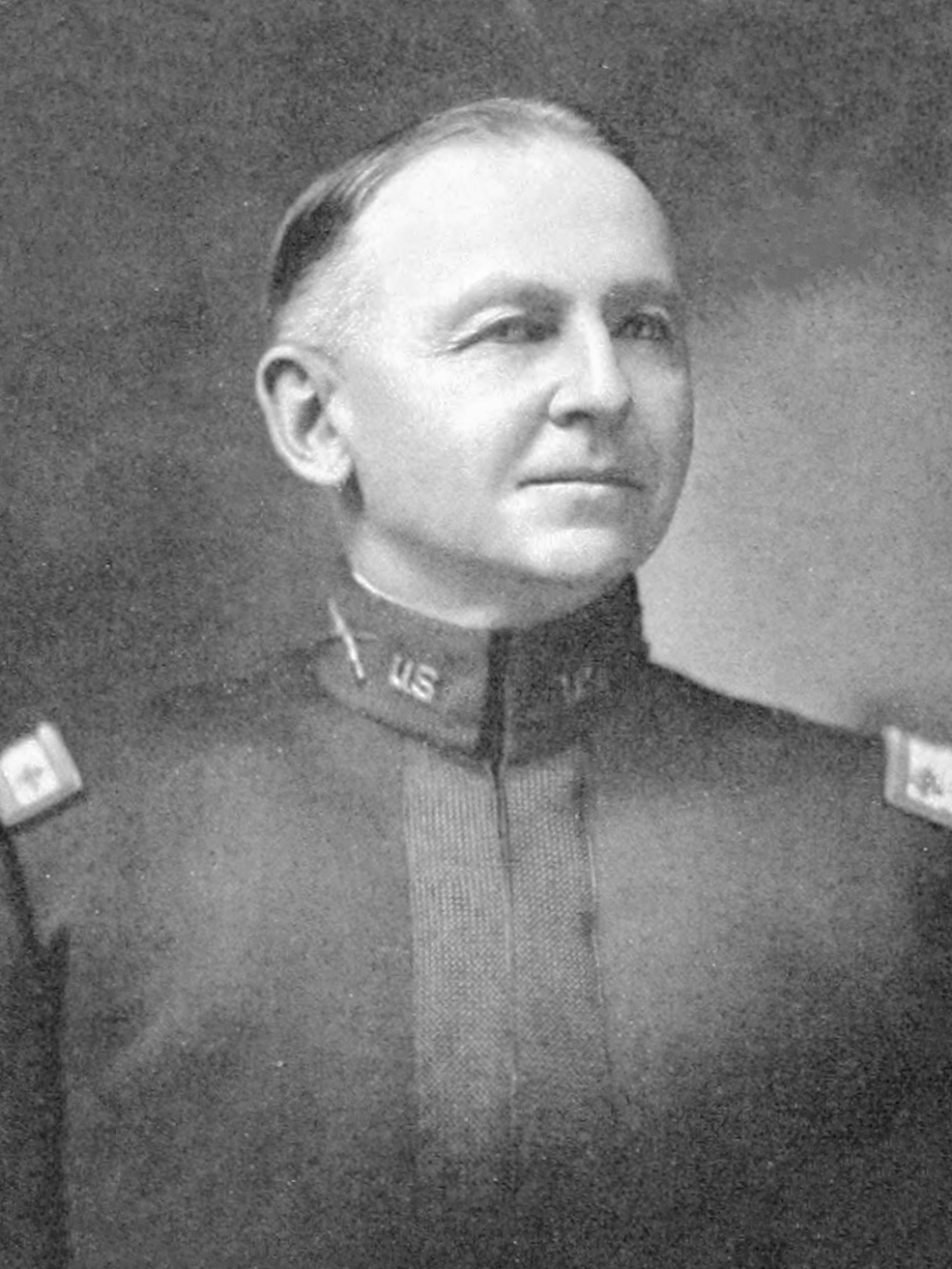
- Brigadier General Joseph C. Castner, commander of the Ninth Infantry Brigade from May 10, 1918
- Born: November 18, 1869; New Brunswick, New Jersey, U.S.
- Died: July 8, 1946 (aged 76)
- Burial place: San Francisco National Cemetery
- Relatives: Lawrence V. Castner (son)
- Military career
- Allegiance: United States
- Branch: United States Army
- Service years: 1891–1933
- Rank: Major General
- Service number: 0-360
- Unit: 5th Division
- Commands: 9th Infantry Brigade; 3rd Infantry Division

Joseph Compton Castner (November 18, 1869 – July 8, 1946) was a United States Army general. He commanded the Ninth Infantry Brigade in all its operations as a part of the Fifth Division, American Expeditionary Forces (AEF) during the final months of World War I.

== Early years ==
He was born in New Brunswick, New Jersey, November 18, 1869. His father, Cornelius W. Castner, served as captain of one of New Brunswick's first companies in the American Civil War. In 1891, Castner graduated from Rutgers College (now Rutgers University ) with a degree in civil engineering.

== Career ==
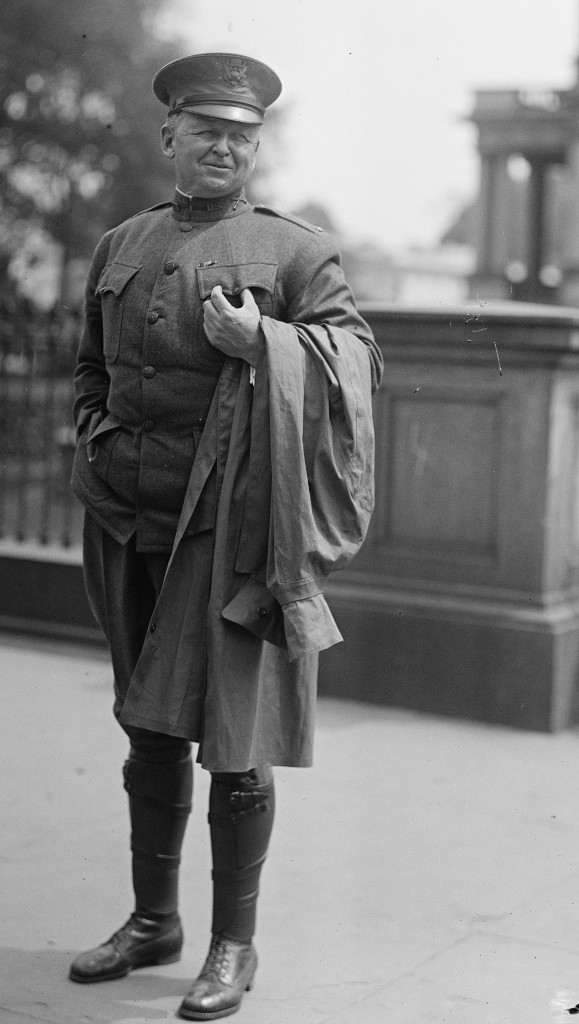
Major Joseph Castner in 1917.

On August 1, 1891, he was commissioned second lieutenant in the United States Army and assigned to the Fourth Infantry for duty. He was promoted as follows: first lieutenant, Fourth Infantry, April 28, 1898; captain, Squadron Philippine Cavalry, April 23, 1900; captain, Fourth Infantry, February 2, 1901; major, Twenty-first Infantry, August 27, 1913; lieutenant colonel, Sixth Infantry, May 13, 1917; colonel, Thirty-eighth Infantry, August 5, 1917; brigadier general, Ninth Brigade, April 12, 1918. He attended the Infantry and Cavalry School in 1895, and was in the War College in 1915.

Prior to World War I Castner had already distinguished himself. While a lieutenant he participated as an explorer in the Glenn Expedition in Alaska. For his services with the Tagalog Scouts in the Philippines, he was promoted to a captaincy in the Philippine Squadron of Cavalry, which commission he held until receiving a captaincy in the Regular Army. Later he served as Constructing Quartermaster in both Honolulu and in Yellowstone National Park. While he was a captain, he commanded the Second Battalion, Fourteenth Infantry and under his training that battalion set an unequaled record in known distance firing. While a major, he was Adjutant General of the District of Columbia Army National Guard, which he developed to a high state of efficiency. As colonel of the Thirty-eighth Infantry, he instilled that fighting spirit which won for his regiment fame as the "Rock of the Marne."

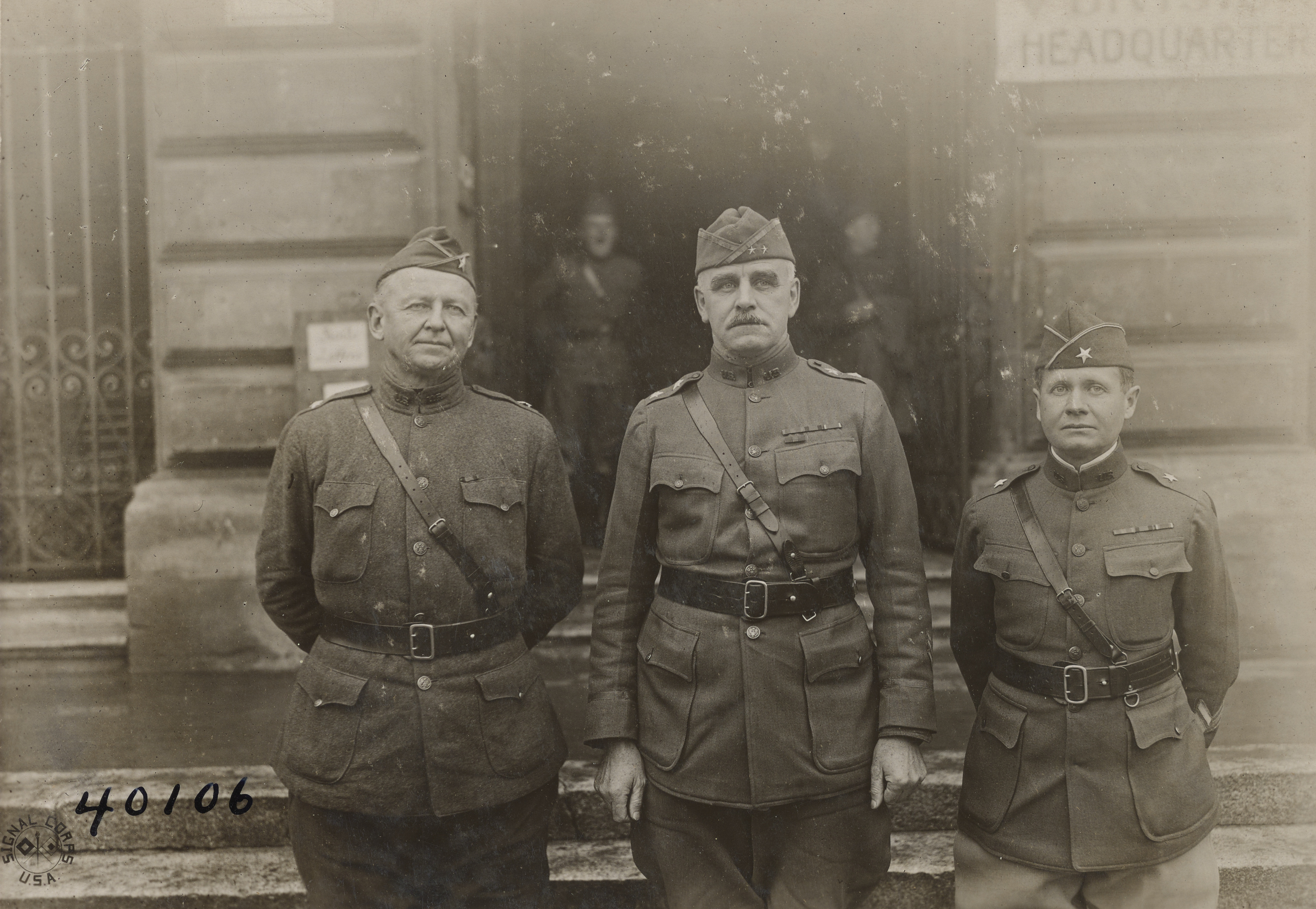
The Commanding General of the 5th Division and his two infantry brigade commanders at Longuyon, Meurthe-et-Moselle, France, November 24, 1918. From left to right: Brigadier General Joseph C. Castner, commanding the 9th Brigade, Major General Hanson E. Ely, commanding the 59th Division, and Brigadier General Paul B. Malone, commanding the 10th Brigade.

As brigadier general, he took command of the Ninth Infantry Brigade. In the quiet Anould and St. Die sectors, he gave the units of the brigade effective training for the big operations that were to follow. In the Battle of Saint-Mihiel, General Castner's brigade was at first in reserve with the Tenth Brigade in line. When passage of lines was made, he pushed his outpost lines up near to the Hindenburg Line. In the first phase of the Meuse-Argonne Offensive, his Brigade captured Cunel and drove the enemy from the Bois-de-la-Pultiere and the northwestern Bois-de-Foret. In the second phase of the Meuse-Argonne Offensive, Castner's brigade captured Aincreville, Clery-le-Grand, Clery-le-Petit, Bois de Babiemont, the Punchbowl, and Doulcon. Then the brigade forced the difficult crossing of the river Meuse and fighting northward captured in succession Dun-sur-Meuse, Milly-devant-Dun, Lion-devant-Dun, Cote St. Germain, Château de Charmois, Mouzay, and the Foret de Woevre.

In appreciation for his services in the Meuse-Argonne Operation, Castner was awarded the Army Distinguished Service Medal, the citation for which reads:

The President of the United States of America, authorized by Act of Congress, July 9, 1918, takes pleasure in presenting the Army Distinguished Service Medal to Brigadier General Joseph Compton Castner, United States Army, for exceptionally meritorious and distinguished services to the Government of the United States, in a duty of great responsibility during World War I. While in Command of the 9th Infantry Brigade, General Castner displayed conspicuous tenacity of purpose and a determination to overcome all obstacles. At the Bois des Rappes in the St. Mihiel salient and ensuing actions, his brigade effectively routed the enemy. The success of his command was in a large measure due to the splendid training and excellent leadership given it by the Commander.

He was cited in the Fifth Division Orders. While his brigade formed part of the army of occupation, Castner took the course of instruction at the Army Center of Artillery Studies at Trier, Germany.

From May 1926 - April 1929, Brig. Gen. Castner was the Commander, US Army Forces in China.

Castner retired while commanding the Third Division in the Western States.

== Death and legacy ==
He died on July 8, 1946. He was buried at San Francisco National Cemetery.

Mount Castner and the Castner Glacier, named in his honor, are both located in the area of Alaska that he explored in 1898. Castner Range and Castner Range National Monument, located in El Paso, Texas, are also named in his honor.

His son, Lawrence V. Castner, also later became an officer in the US Army.

== See also ==
- List of commanders of 1st Cavalry Division (United States)
