= Mentasta Mountains =

Mountain range in Alaska, United States

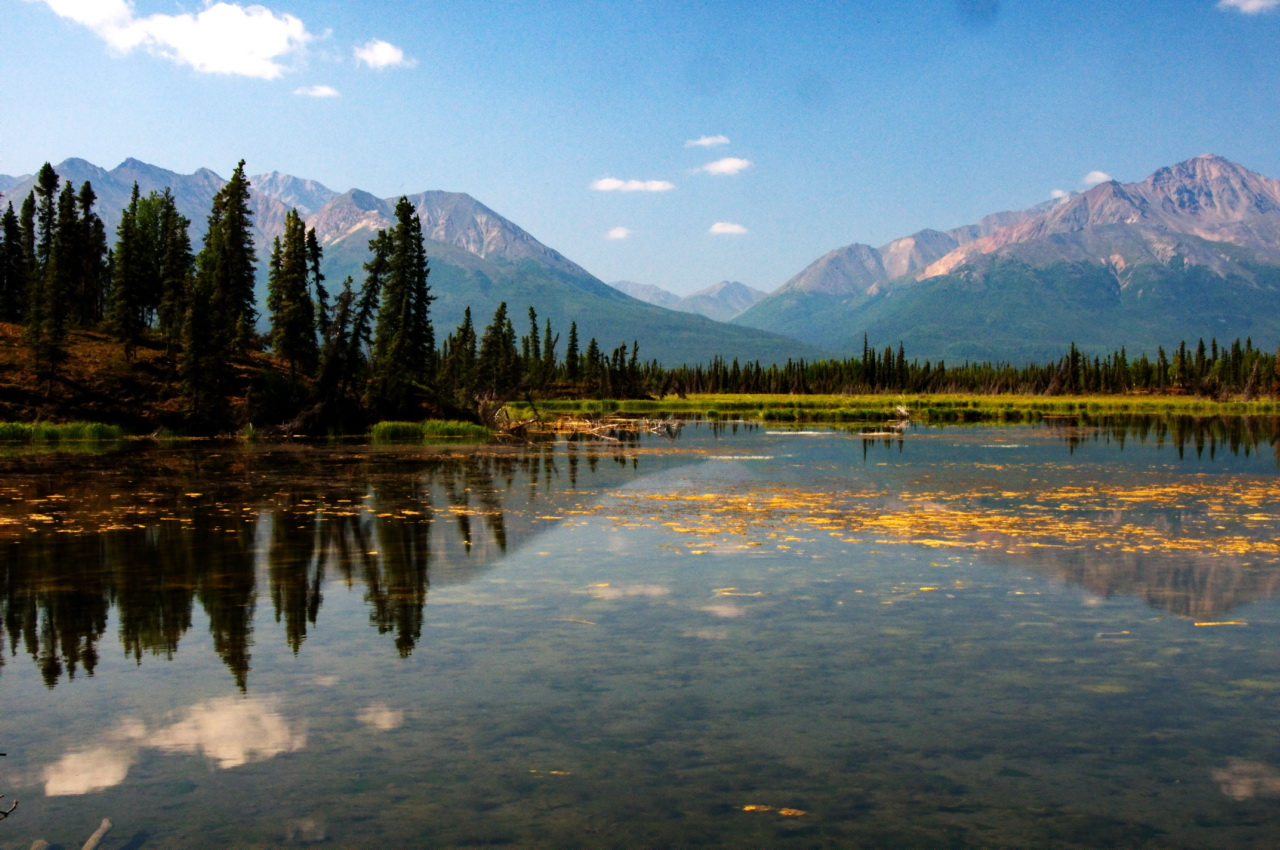
- Mentasa Mts. as seen from the Tok Cut-Off (Glenn Hwy)

Highest point
- Peak: Unnamed Peak (Alaska)
- Elevation: 8,365 ft (2,550 m)
- Coordinates: 62°39′02″N 143°10′18″W

Dimensions
- Length: 40 mi (64 km) East-West
- Width: 25 mi (40 km) North-South

Geography
- Country: United States
- State: Alaska
- Range coordinates: 62°36′24″N 143°04′23″W
- Parent range: Alaska Range
- Borders on: Alaska Highway, Glenn Highway, Wrangell Mountains and Nabesna River

The Mentasta Mountains in the eastern part of the U.S. state of Alaska form the eastern end of the Alaska Range. They lie south of the Alaska Highway, east of the Glenn Highway, north of the Wrangell Mountains, and west of the Nabesna River. Across the Glenn Highway lies the continuation of the Alaska Range, while across the Nabesna River lie the Nutzotin Mountains. They form the northern boundary of Wrangell-St. Elias National Park & Preserve. The highest point of the Mentasta Mountains is an unnamed peak unofficially called Tetlin Peak with an elevation of 8,365 feet (2,550 m).
