= Mentasta Pass =

- Interactive map of Mentasta Pass
- Elevation: 2,450 ft (750 m)
- Traversed by: Glenn Highway

Third Approach
- Location: Copper River Census Area, U.S.
- Range: Alaska Range/Mentasta Mountains
- Coordinates: 62°55′20″N 143°40′32″W
- Topo map: USGS Nabesna D-6

Mentasta Pass is a major mountain pass in Alaska, separating the Alaska Range on the west from the Mentasta Mountains on the east. Alaska Route 1 (the Glenn Highway) runs through the pass, connecting the Copper River Valley with the Alaska Highway.

Mentasta Pass is notable as the key col between Mount Logan (highpoint of Canada and the Saint Elias Mountains) and Denali (highpoint of the United States and the Alaska Range). Because of its relatively low elevation, Mount Logan's prominence is the 6th highest in the world, despite being relatively close to Denali.
