= Paxson, Alaska =

Census-designated place in Alaska, United States

- CDP
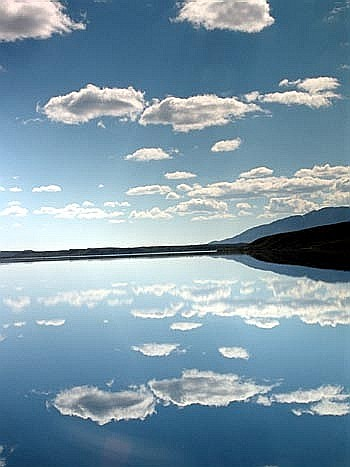

- Location within the state of Alaska
- Coordinates: 63.03°N 145.50°W
- Country: United States
- State: Alaska
- Census Area: Copper River

Government
  - State senator: Click Bishop (R)
  - State rep.: Mike Cronk (R)

Area
  - Total: 319.14 sq mi (826.57 km^{2})
  - Land: 304.96 sq mi (789.85 km^{2})
  - Water: 14.18 sq mi (36.72 km^{2})
- Elevation: 3,396 ft (1,035 m)

Population (2020)
  - Total: 26
  - Density: 0.078/sq mi (0.03/km^{2})
- Time zone: UTC-9 (Alaska (AKST))
  - Summer (DST): UTC-8 (AKDT)
- Area code: 907
- FIPS code: 02-59320
- GNIS feature ID: 1866966

Paxson is a census-designated place (CDP) in Copper River Census Area, Alaska, United States. As of the 2020 census, its population was 26, down from 40 in 2010. It is located on the Richardson Highway at the junction with the Denali Highway.

Currently, there are five accommodations in Paxson, as well as several gift shops, a post office, a gas station and food shops. The activity of the locality is turned to tourism in summer, and by hunting and livelihood activities for permanent residents.

== Geography ==
Paxson is located at 63°2′43″N 145°36′51″W (63.045307, −145.614117). The two highways which converge there come through two nearby mountain passes, Isabel Pass and Mentasta Pass.

According to the United States Census Bureau, the CDP has a total area of 318.3 square miles (824 km^{2}), of which, 304.0 square miles (787 km^{2}) of it is land and 14.3 square miles (37 km^{2}) of it (4.48%) is water.

== Climate ==
Paxson has a continental subarctic climate (Köppen Dfc), closely bordering on an alpine climate (Köppen ET) due to its high elevation and northerly latitude, with only one month above the 50 degree isotherm.

Climate data for Paxson (1991–2020 normals, extremes 1914–2010)
Month	Jan	Feb	Mar	Apr	May	Jun	Jul	Aug	Sep	Oct	Nov	Dec	Year
Record high °F (°C)	41 (5)	45 (7)	52 (11)	68 (20)	77 (25)	86 (30)	86 (30)	86 (30)	79 (26)	62 (17)	48 (9)	50 (10)	86 (30)
Mean daily maximum °F (°C)	9.5 (−12.5)	18.1 (−7.7)	22.5 (−5.3)	38.1 (3.4)	52.0 (11.1)	64.3 (17.9)	65.3 (18.5)	59.7 (15.4)	49.0 (9.4)	33.0 (0.6)	16.2 (−8.8)	10.8 (−11.8)	36.5 (2.5)
Daily mean °F (°C)	−0.1 (−17.8)	7.4 (−13.7)	10.7 (−11.8)	26.4 (−3.1)	40.7 (4.8)	51.4 (10.8)	53.8 (12.1)	49.6 (9.8)	39.9 (4.4)	24.4 (−4.2)	7.4 (−13.7)	2.7 (−16.3)	26.2 (−3.2)
Mean daily minimum °F (°C)	−9.7 (−23.2)	−3.2 (−19.6)	−1.1 (−18.4)	14.8 (−9.6)	29.3 (−1.5)	38.5 (3.6)	42.2 (5.7)	39.5 (4.2)	30.8 (−0.7)	15.7 (−9.1)	−1.4 (−18.6)	−5.4 (−20.8)	15.8 (−9.0)
Record low °F (°C)	−50 (−46)	−46 (−43)	−43 (−42)	−50 (−46)	−9 (−23)	10 (−12)	20 (−7)	13 (−11)	−5 (−21)	−25 (−32)	−39 (−39)	−55 (−48)	−55 (−48)
Average precipitation inches (mm)	0.84 (21)	0.56 (14)	0.47 (12)	0.47 (12)	1.26 (32)	2.29 (58)	2.72 (69)	3.12 (79)	2.94 (75)	1.66 (42)	0.91 (23)	1.07 (27)	18.31 (465)
Average snowfall inches (cm)	17.7 (45)	21.0 (53)	4.5 (11)	17.0 (43)	0.5 (1.3)	0.0 (0.0)	0.0 (0.0)	0.0 (0.0)	4.4 (11)	15.4 (39)	14.6 (37)	16.4 (42)	111.4 (283)
Average precipitation days	5	4	5	5	6	11	11	13	11	7	5	7	90
Source 1: NOAA (Precipitation 1981-2010)
Source 2: WRCC

Climate data for Glennallen 64 N, Alaska, 1991–2020 normals: 2669ft (814m)
Month	Jan	Feb	Mar	Apr	May	Jun	Jul	Aug	Sep	Oct	Nov	Dec	Year
Mean daily maximum °F (°C)	6.5 (−14.2)	15.2 (−9.3)	22.4 (−5.3)	37.0 (2.8)	50.9 (10.5)	62.6 (17.0)	65.9 (18.8)	60.1 (15.6)	50.5 (10.3)	32.6 (0.3)	14.7 (−9.6)	11.0 (−11.7)	35.8 (2.1)
Daily mean °F (°C)	−1.8 (−18.8)	4.2 (−15.4)	9.8 (−12.3)	26.0 (−3.3)	40.4 (4.7)	50.7 (10.4)	54.5 (12.5)	49.9 (9.9)	40.9 (4.9)	24.4 (−4.2)	5.5 (−14.7)	1.1 (−17.2)	25.5 (−3.6)
Mean daily minimum °F (°C)	−10.1 (−23.4)	−6.8 (−21.6)	−2.8 (−19.3)	15.0 (−9.4)	29.9 (−1.2)	38.8 (3.8)	43.1 (6.2)	39.8 (4.3)	31.2 (−0.4)	16.2 (−8.8)	−3.7 (−19.8)	−8.8 (−22.7)	15.1 (−9.4)
Average precipitation inches (mm)	0.86 (22)	0.52 (13)	0.84 (21)	0.55 (14)	1.13 (29)	2.48 (63)	3.15 (80)	2.98 (76)	2.37 (60)	1.20 (30)	1.43 (36)	1.23 (31)	18.74 (475)
Source: NOAA

== Demographics ==
Historical population
Census	Pop.	Note	%±
1980	30		—
1990	30		0.0%
2000	43		43.3%
2010	40		−7.0%
2020	26		−35.0%
U.S. Decennial Census

Paxson first appeared on the 1980 U.S. Census as a census-designated place (CDP).

As of the census of 2000, there were 43 people, 21 households, and 11 families residing in the CDP. The population density was 0.1 inhabitants per square mile (0.039/km^{2}). There were 117 housing units at an average density of 0.4 per square mile (0.15/km^{2}). All residents reported that they were white.

There were 21 households, of which six had children under the age of 18 living with them, ten were married couples living together, one had a female householder with no husband present, and nine were non-families. Eight households were made up of individuals, and one had someone living alone who was 65 years of age or older. The average household size was 2.05 and the average family size was 2.75.

In the CDP, the age distribution of the population shows 11 persons under the age of 18, three from 18 to 24, ten from 25 to 44, 14 from 45 to 64, and five who were 65 years of age or older. The median age was 40 years. There were 20 females and 21 males (including 12 females and 20 males over age 18).

The median income for a household in the CDP was $46,500, and the median income for a family was $46,667. Males had a median income of $45,625 versus $21,250 for females. The per capita income for the CDP was $26,071. None of the population and none of the families were below the poverty line.
