= Hayes Range =

Alaskan mountain range

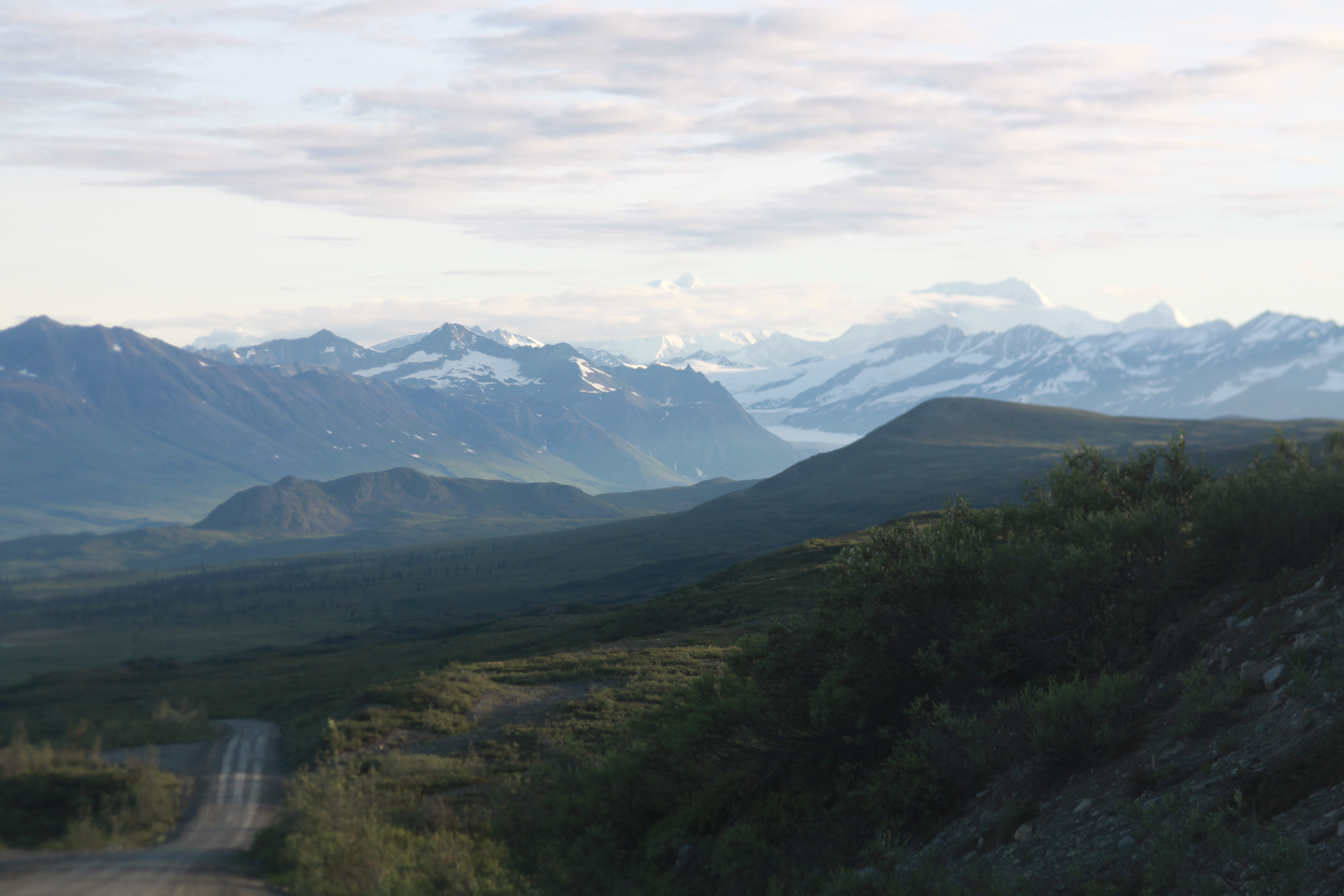

Highest point
- Peak: Mount Hayes
- Elevation: 13,832 ft (4,216 m)
- Coordinates: 63°33′00″N 147°53′00″W

Dimensions
- Length: 147 mi (237 km)
- Area: 13,406 mi^{2} (34,720 km^{2})

Geography
- Location within Alaska
- Country: United States
- Region: Alaska

The Hayes Range is a part of the Alaska Range in Denali and the census area of Southeast Fairbanks, Alaska in the United States. The mountains are east of Denali National Park, separated by the Nenana River and Windy Pass, and are west of the Delta Mountains, separated by the Delta River and Isabel Pass. As the crow flies, the Hayes Range is located about 100 miles (160 km) south of Fairbanks, and 200 miles (320 km) northeast of Anchorage. The mountains extend about 147 miles (237 km) from east to west.

The highest point of the range is Mount Hayes, 13,832 feet (4,216 m). Other notable summits of the range include Mount Moffit (2nd-highest), Mount Shand (3rd), Moby Dick (4th), Mount Deborah (5th), Hess Mountain (7th), McGinnis Peak (8th), and Mount Balchen (9th).

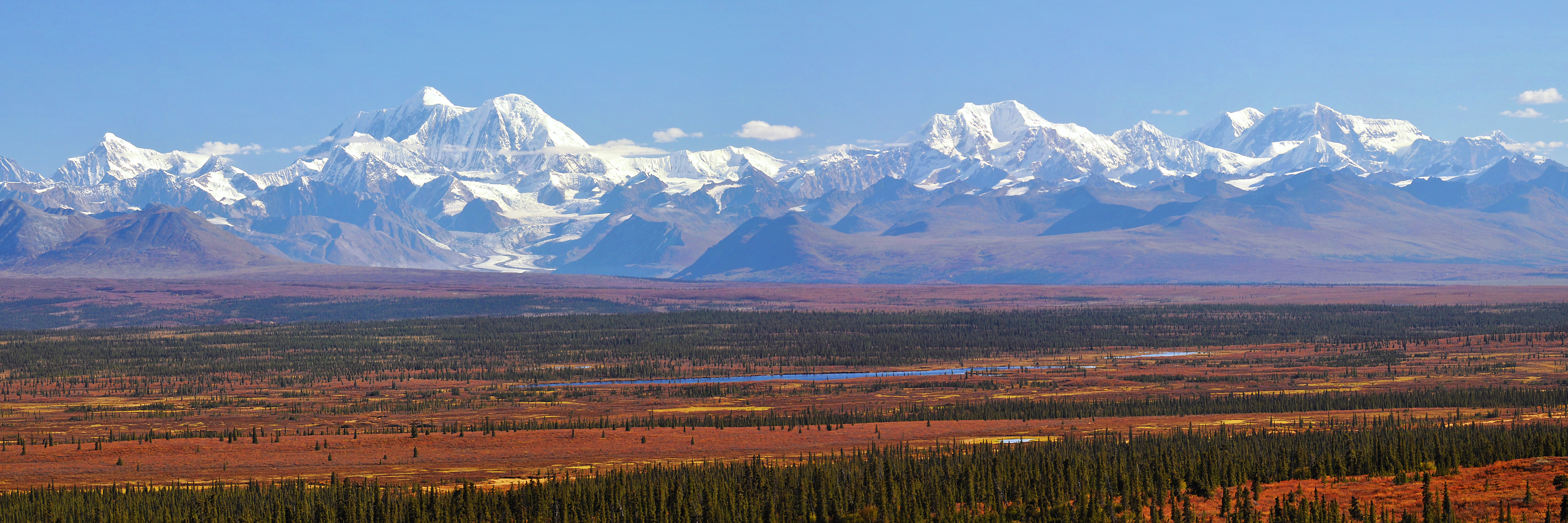
Hayes Range from the Denali Highway. Mt. Balchen, Mt. Hayes, Moby Dick, and Shand

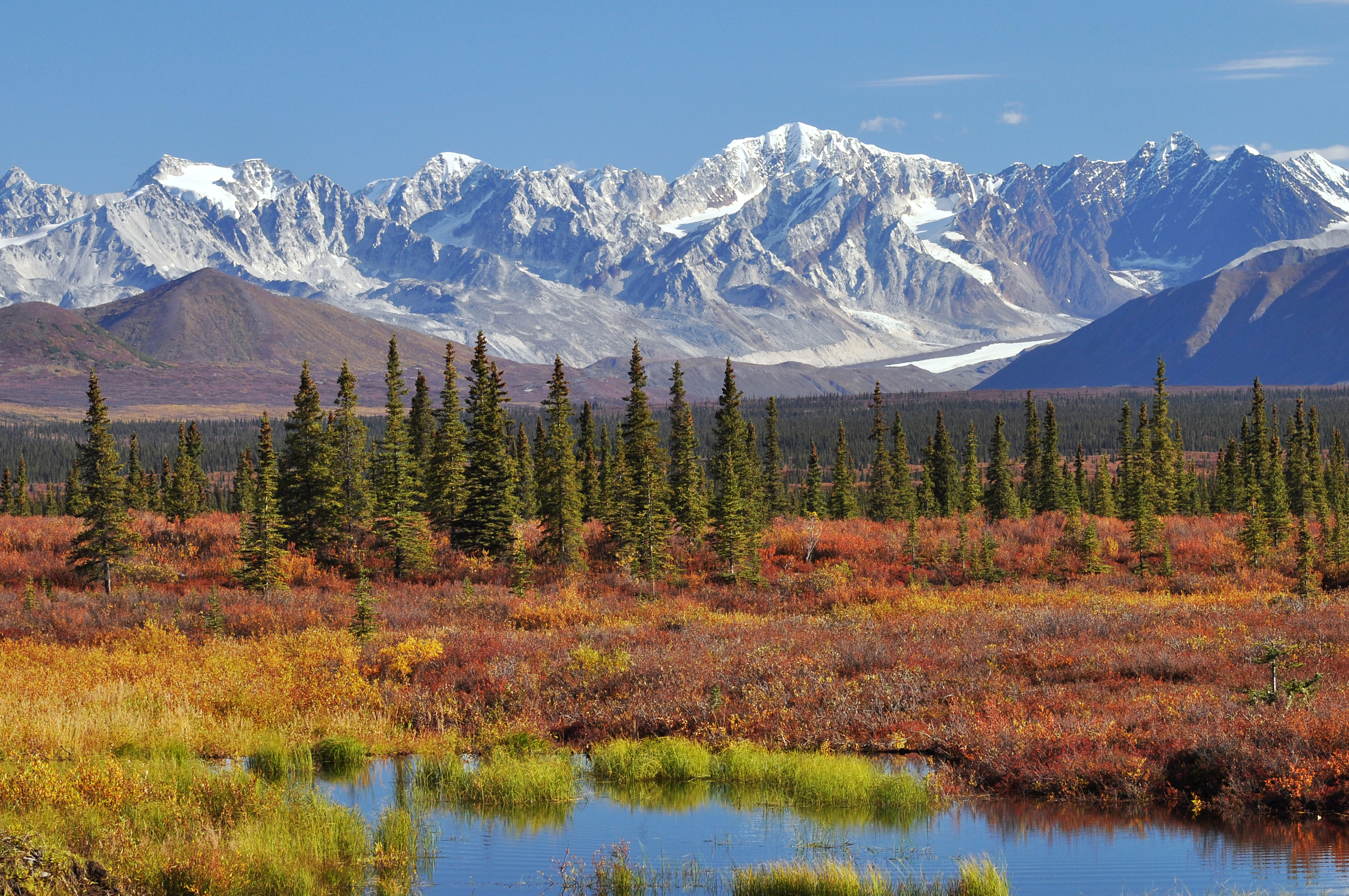
The Hayes Range in the area of Monahan Flat and Nenana Mountain
