= McGinnis Peak (Alaska Range) =

Mountain in Alaska, United States

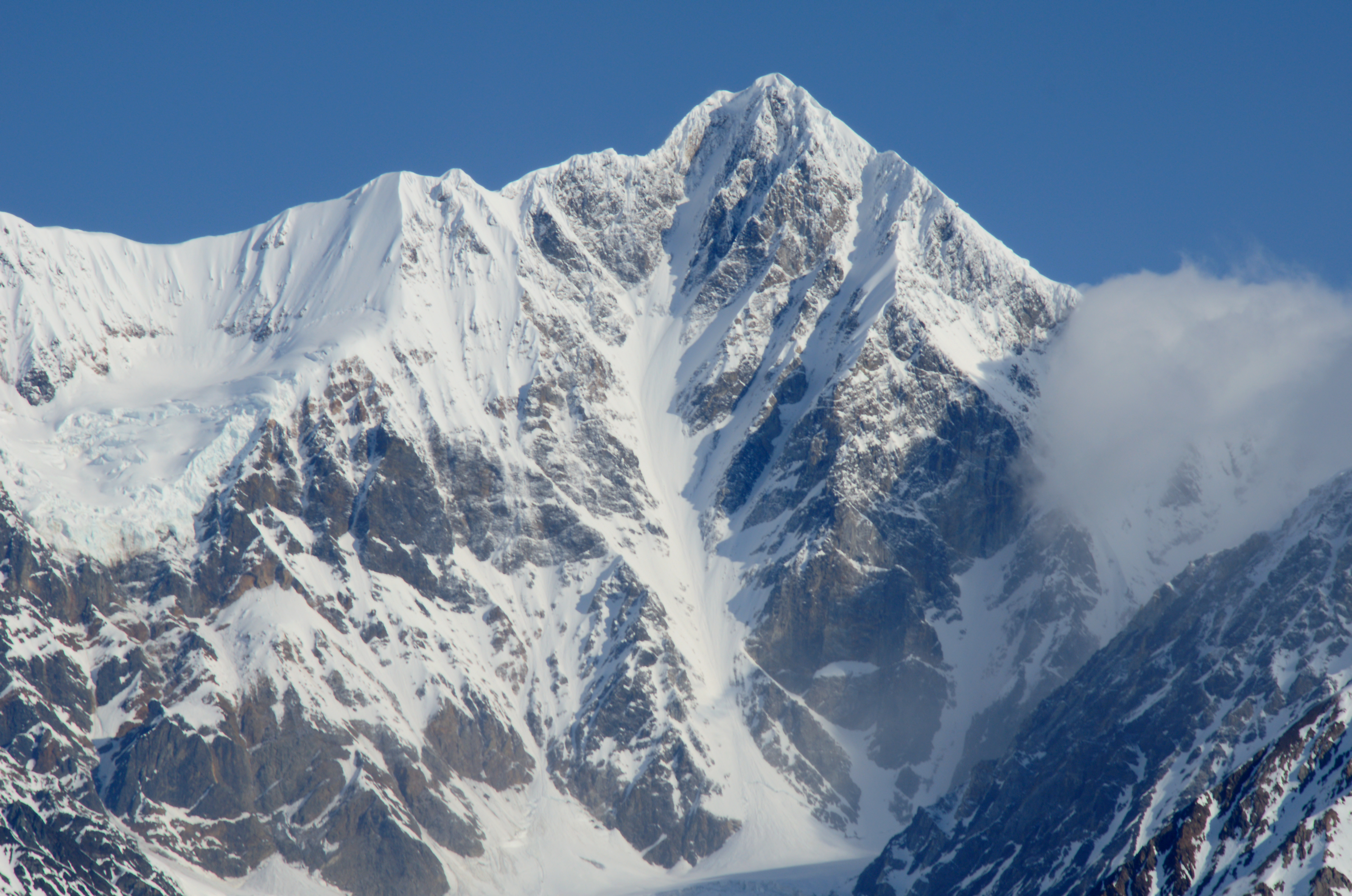
- South aspect from Black Rapids Glacier

Highest point
- Elevation: 11,400 ft (3,500 m)
- Prominence: 1,600 ft (490 m)
- Parent peak: Mount Shand (12,660 ft)
- Isolation: 2.81 mi (4.52 km)
- Coordinates: 63°32′41″N 146°18′14″W

Geography
- Location within Alaska
- Interactive map of McGinnis Peak
- Country: United States
- State: Alaska
- Census Area: Southeast Fairbanks
- Parent range: Alaska Range; Hayes Range
- Topo map: USGS Mount Hayes C-5

Climbing
- First ascent: 1964, L. Muir, T. Knott
- Easiest route: Northeast Ridge, technical climb

McGinnis Peak is an 11,400 ft (3,470 m) elevation glaciated summit located at the head of McGinnis Glacier in the eastern Alaska Range, in Alaska, United States. It is the eighth-highest peak in the Hayes Range, a subset of the Alaska Range. This remote peak is situated 14 mi (23 km) southeast of Mount Hayes, and 95 mi (153 km) southeast of Fairbanks. Mount Moffit, the nearest higher neighbor, is set 3.33 mi (5 km) to the northwest, and Mount Shand is positioned 4.5 mi (7 km) to the west. The Richardson Highway is 15 mi (24 km) to the east, with Hayes, McGinnis, and Moffit dominating the landscape along the drive south.

Enormous rockslides fell from McGinnis Peak during the 2002 Denali earthquake, which had an epicenter 35 miles to the west. The slides released a significant volume of deposits.

== Climate ==
Based on the Köppen climate classification, McGinnis Peak is located in a subarctic climate zone with long, cold, snowy winters, and mild summers. This climate supports the Trident, Black Rapids, and McGinnis Glaciers surrounding this peak. Temperatures can drop below −20 °C with wind chill factors below −30 °C. The months May through June offer the most favorable weather for climbing or viewing. Precipitation runoff from the mountain drains into tributaries of the Tanana River drainage basin.

== Climbing ==
All established climbing routes are technical, and include the Northeast Ridge (WI3), The Southeast Ridge, and the Cut-throat Couloir (WI5). The first ascent of this peak was made August 5, 1964, by Larry Muir and Tom Knott via the West Ridge. The second ascent was made June 21, 1976, by John Garson and James Brady via the knife-edge Northeast Ridge. The first ascent via the Southeast Ridge was made May 5, 1980 by Walter Palkovitch and Dan Gray. The first ascent via Cut-throat Couloir was made in March 1985 by Roman Dial and Chuck Comstock. The standard descent route is the Northeast Ridge.

== Gallery ==
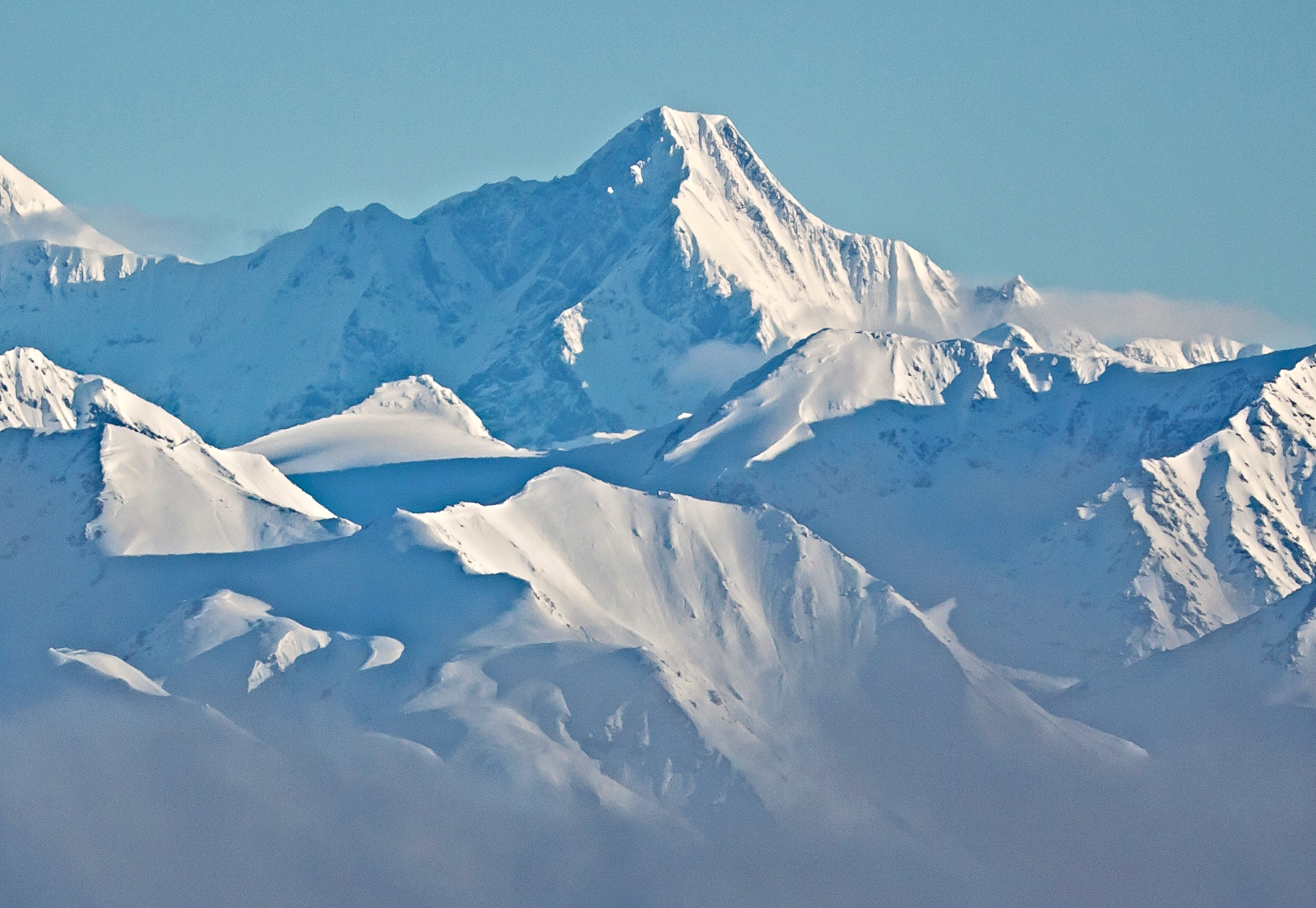
McGinnis Peak from southeast

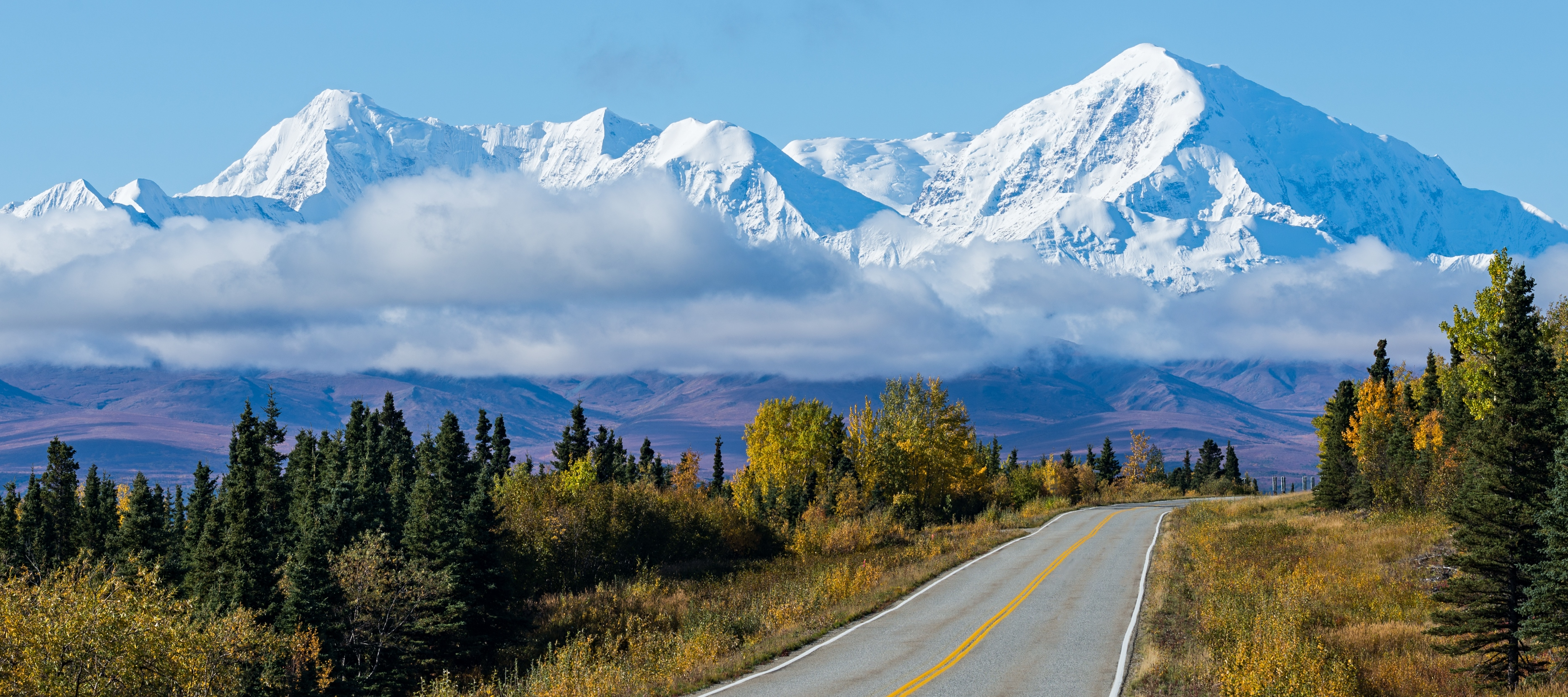
McGinnis Peak (left), Mt. Moffit (right), from the Richardson Highway

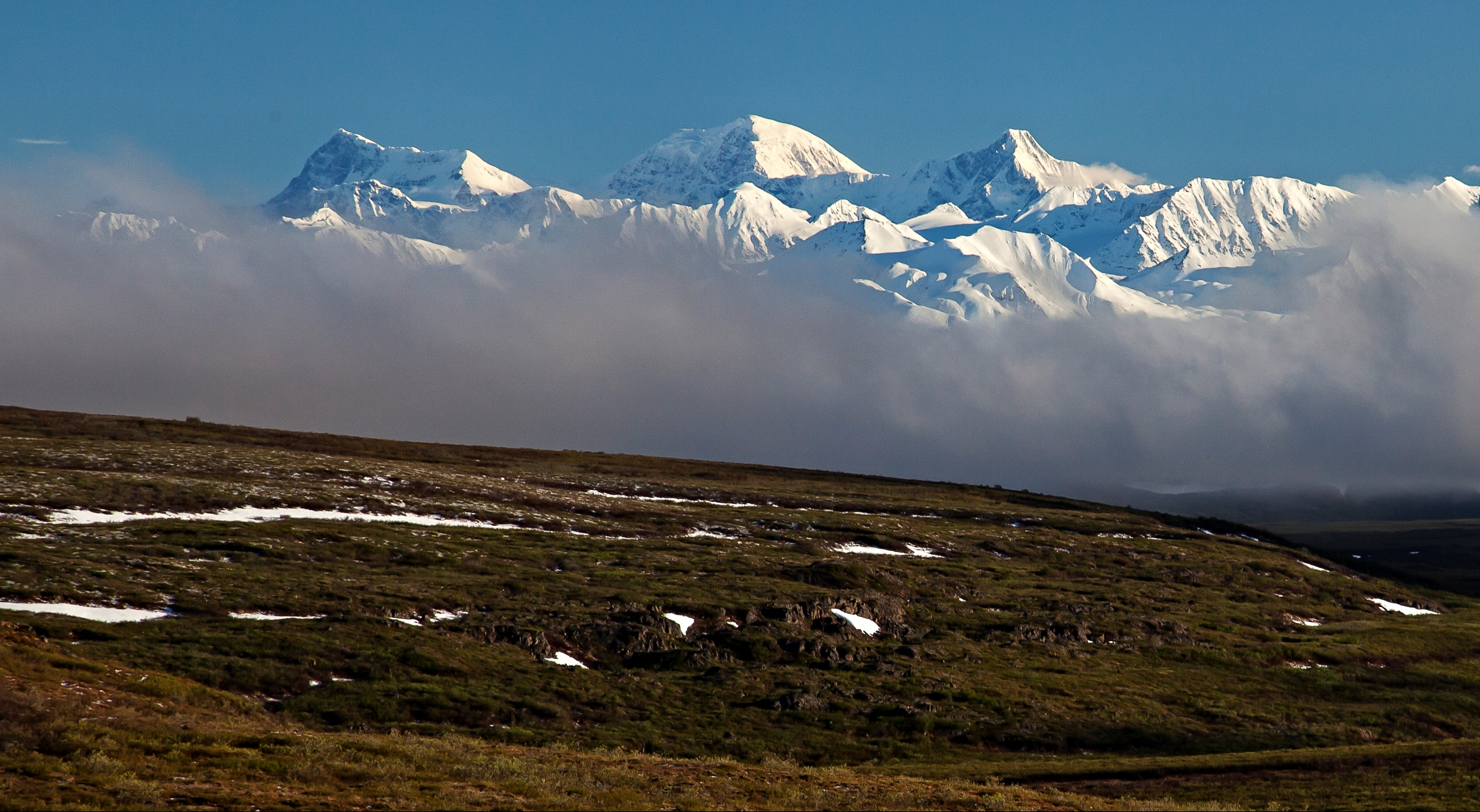
Mt. Shand (left), Moffit (center), McGinnis Peak (right) from south

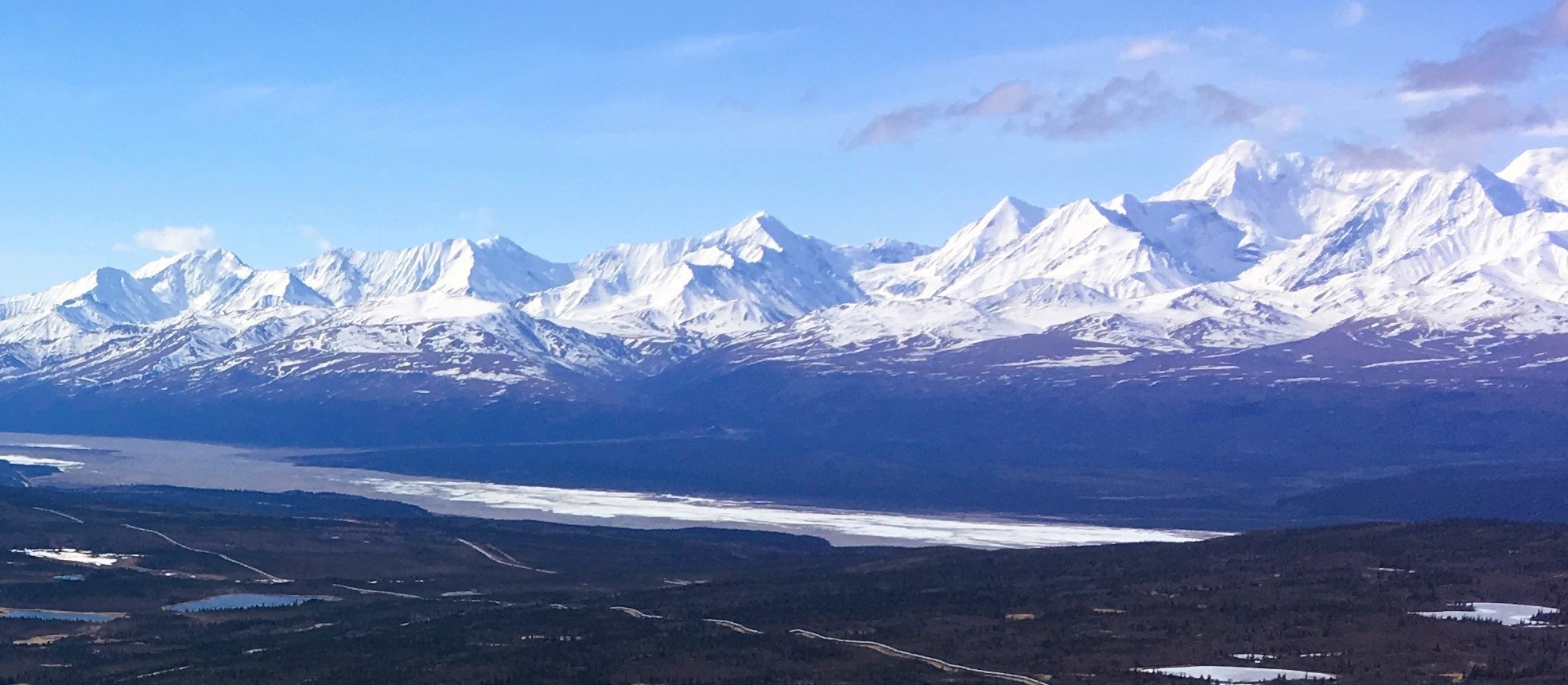
Delta River and the Alaska Range with McGinnis Peak to the right.

== See also ==
- List of mountain peaks of Alaska
- Geology of Alaska
