= Mount Balchen (Alaska) =

Mountain in Alaska, United States

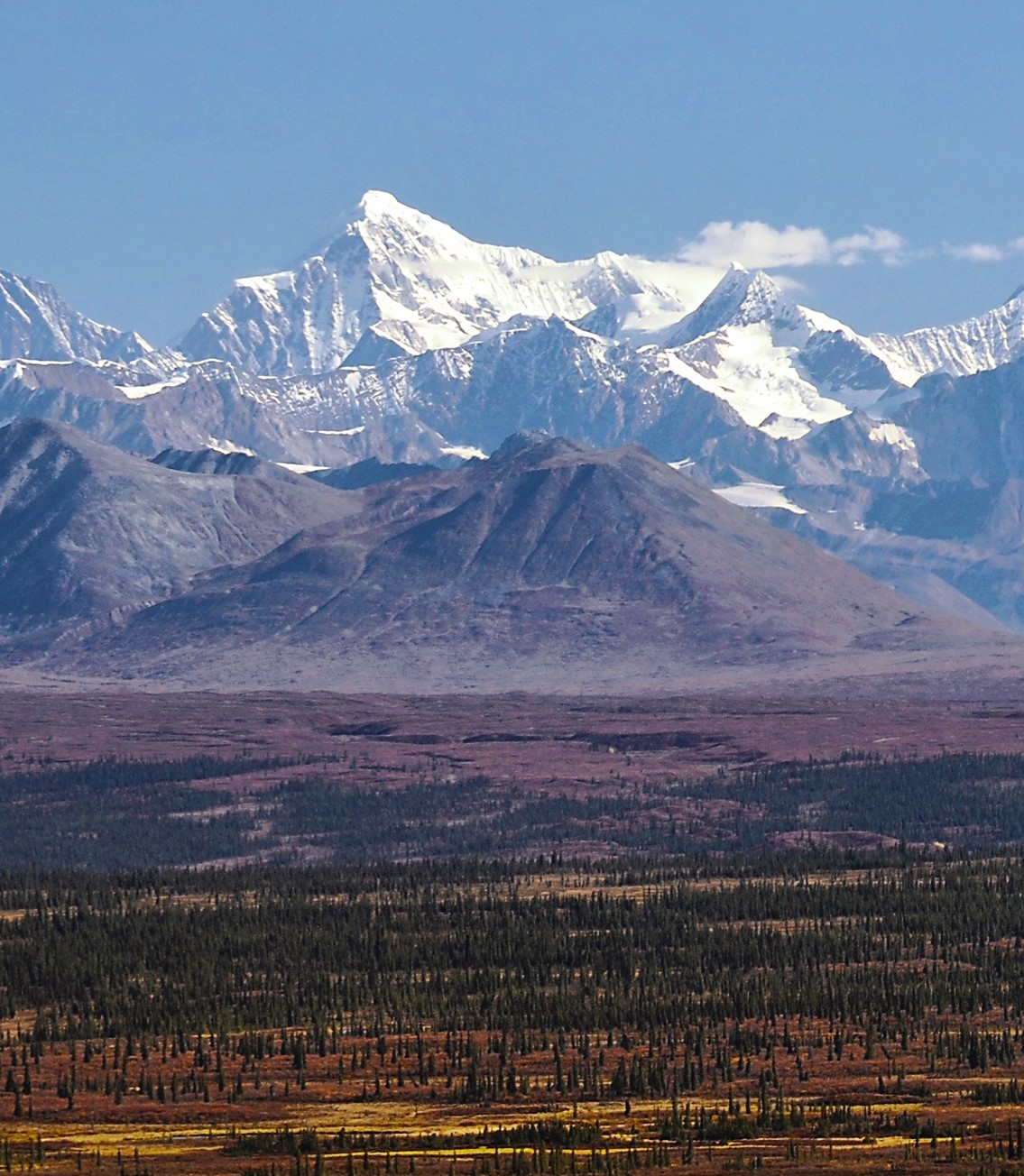
- Southwest aspect, from Denali Highway

Highest point
- Elevation: 11,205 ft (3,415 m)
- Prominence: 1,990 ft (610 m)
- Parent peak: Mount Hayes (13,832 ft)
- Isolation: 4.28 mi (6.89 km)
- Coordinates: 63°37′25″N 146°51′09″W

Naming
- Etymology: Bernt Balchen

Geography
- Location within Alaska
- Country: United States
- State: Alaska
- Census Area: Southeast Fairbanks Census Area
- Parent range: Alaska Range; Hayes Range
- Topo map: USGS Mount Hayes C-6

Climbing
- First ascent: 1974

Mount Balchen is an 11,205-foot-elevation (3,415-meter) mountain summit in Alaska, United States.

== Description ==
Mount Balchen is a glaciated mountain located on the crest of the eastern Alaska Range. It is the ninth-highest peak in the Hayes Range which is a subrange of the Alaska Range. This remote peak is situated 4.4 miles (7.1 km) west of Mount Hayes and 85 miles (137 km) south-southeast of Fairbanks. Precipitation runoff from the mountain drains north into tributaries of the Tanana River and south to the Susitna River. Topographic relief is significant as the summit rises 3,700 feet (1,128 m) above the Hayes Glacier in 0.65 mile (1 km). The first ascent of the summit was made on April 30, 1974, by Dusan Jagersky and William Q. Sumner via the east ridge.

== Etymology ==
The mountain is named for Bernt Balchen (1899–1973), United States Air Force, Arctic explorer and aviator. The mountain's toponym was officially adopted in 1974 by the U.S. Board on Geographic Names. There is a Mount Balchen in Antarctica which is also named after him.

== Climate ==
Based on the Köppen climate classification, Mount Balchen is located in a subarctic climate zone with long, cold, snowy winters, and cool summers. This climate supports the Hayes, Gillam, and Susitna Glaciers surrounding this peak. Winter temperatures can drop below −20 °F with wind chill factors below −30 °F. The months May through June offer the most favorable weather for climbing or viewing.

== Gallery ==
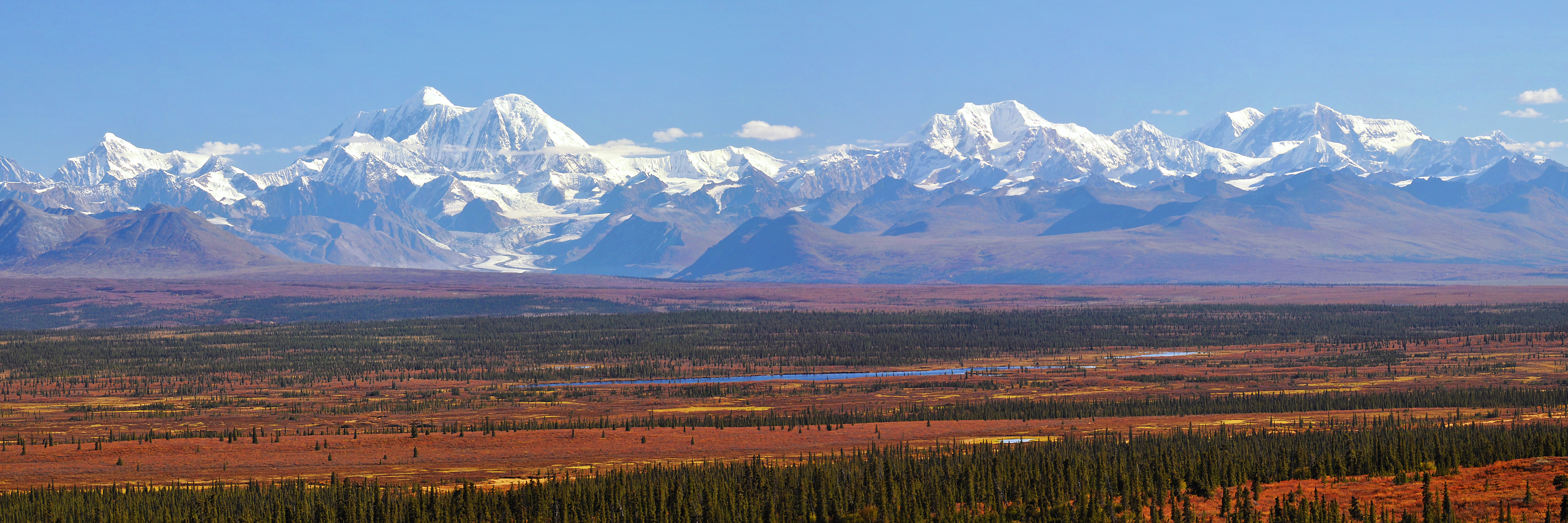
The Hayes Range. L→R: Mt. Balchen, Mt. Hayes, Moby Dick, Mt. Shand

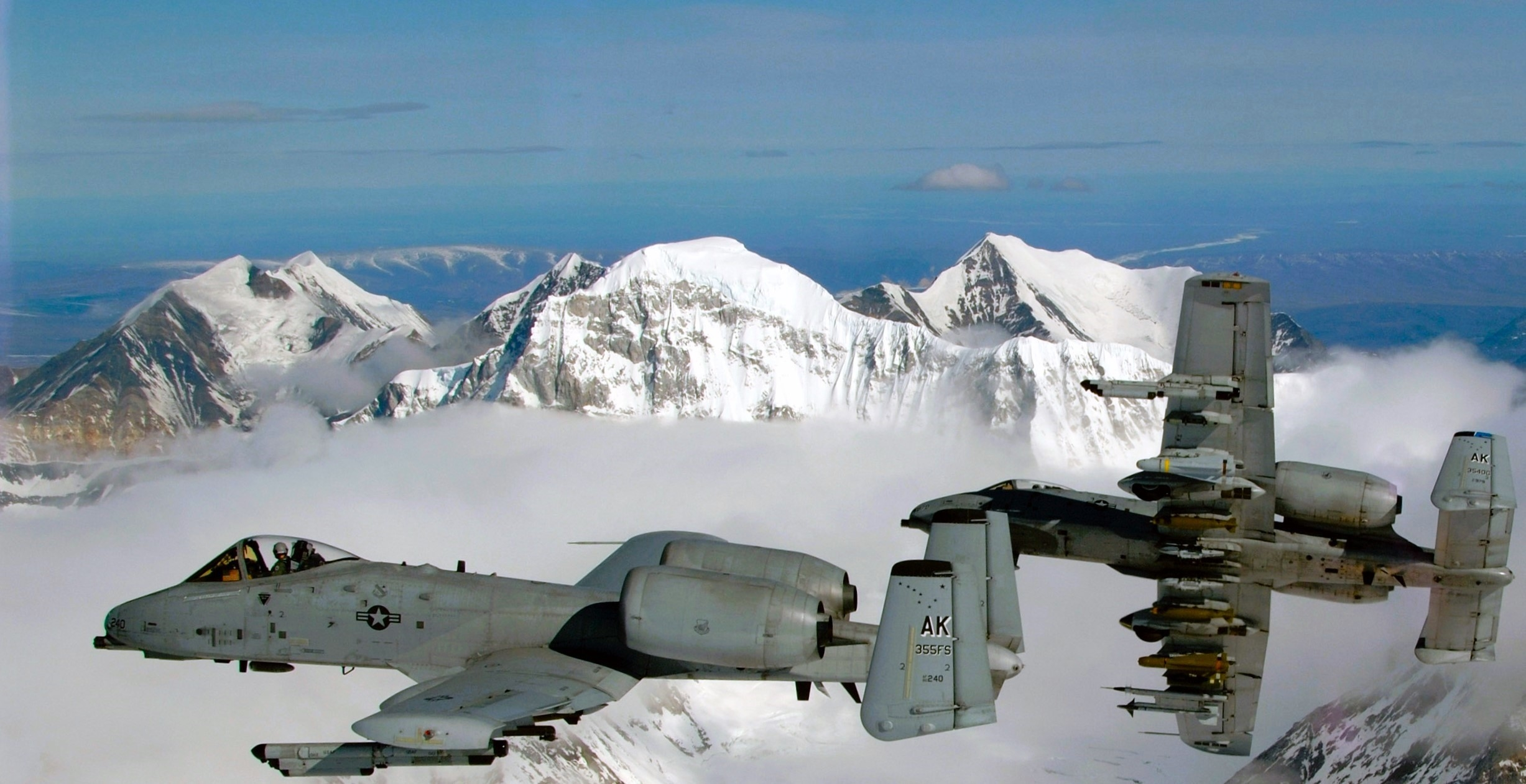
South aspect of Mount Balchen centered. Mt. Giddings to left, Mt. Skarland to right, and part of Mt. Geist behind Balchen.

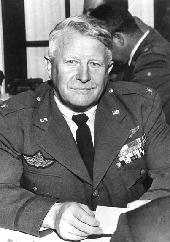
Bernt Balchen

== See also ==
- List of mountain peaks of Alaska
- Geology of Alaska
