= Moby Dick (Alaska) =

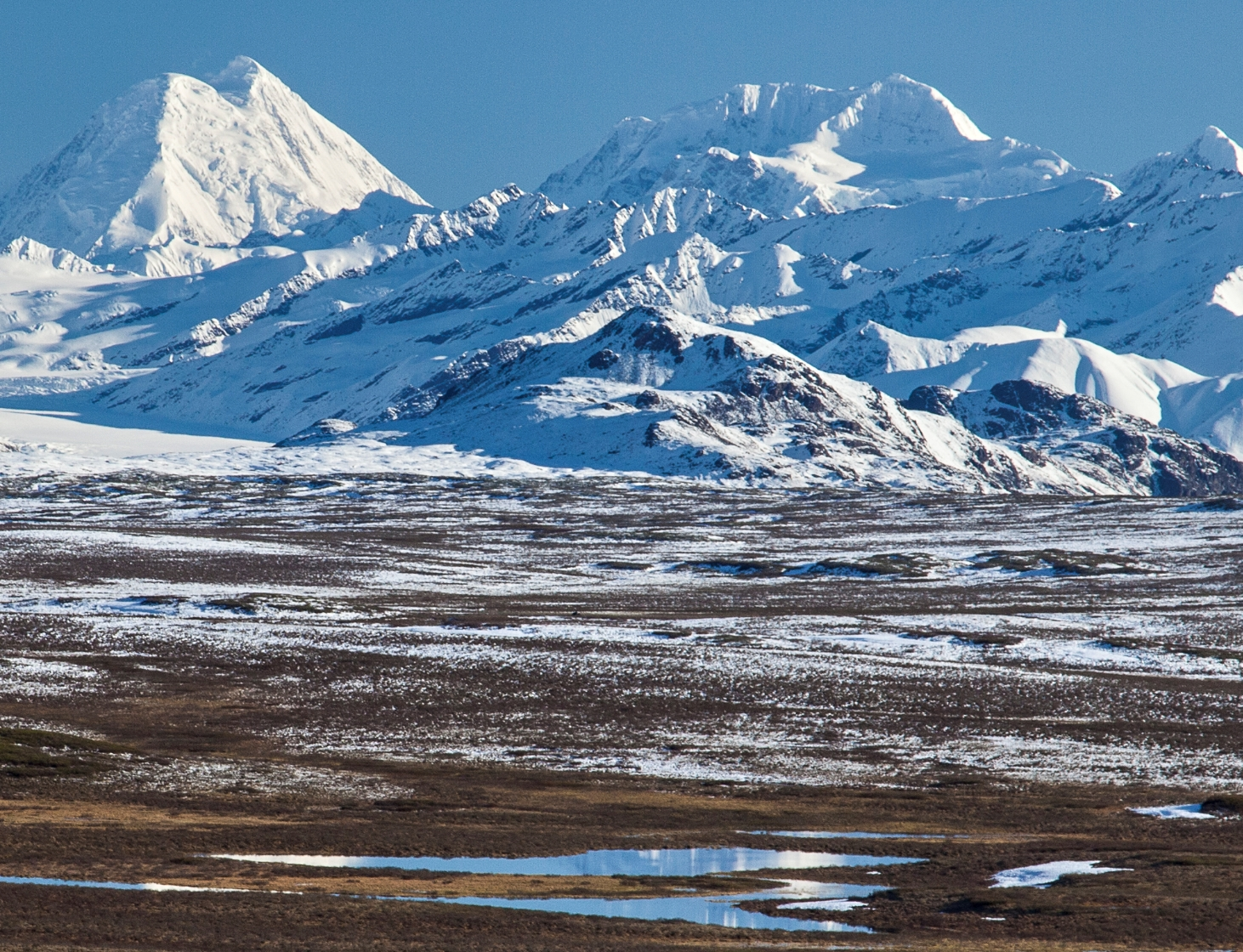
- Moby Dick from the south (Mount Hayes to left)

Highest point
- Elevation: 12,360 ft (3,770 m)
- Prominence: 2,860 ft (870 m)
- Parent peak: Mount Hayes (13,832 ft)
- Isolation: 4.6 mi (7.4 km)
- Coordinates: 63°33′22″N 146°36′09″W

Geography
- Location within Alaska
- Interactive map of Moby Dick
- Location: Southeast Fairbanks Census Area; Alaska, United States
- Parent range: Alaska Range; Hayes Range
- Topo map: USGS Mount Hayes C-6

Climbing
- First ascent: 1964

Moby Dick is a 12,360 ft (3,770 m) elevation glaciated summit located at the head of the Trident Glacier in the eastern Alaska Range, in Alaska, United States. It is the fourth-highest peak in the Hayes Range, a subset of the Alaska Range. This remote peak is situated 5.7 mi (9 km) southeast of Mount Hayes, and 92 mi (148 km) southeast of Fairbanks. Mount Shand, the nearest higher neighbor, is set 4.7 mi (8 km) to the east. The first ascent of this unofficially named mountain was made in 1964 by Christopher Goetze, Lydia Goetze, Tom Knott, and Larry Muir.

== Climate ==
Based on the Köppen climate classification, Moby Dick is located in a subarctic climate zone with long, cold, snowy winters, and mild summers. This climate supports the Trident, Susitna, and Black Rapids Glaciers surrounding this peak. Temperatures can drop below −20 °C with wind chill factors below −30 °C. The months May through June offer the most favorable weather for climbing or viewing. Precipitation runoff from the mountain drains into tributaries of the Susitna and Tanana River drainage basins.

== Gallery ==
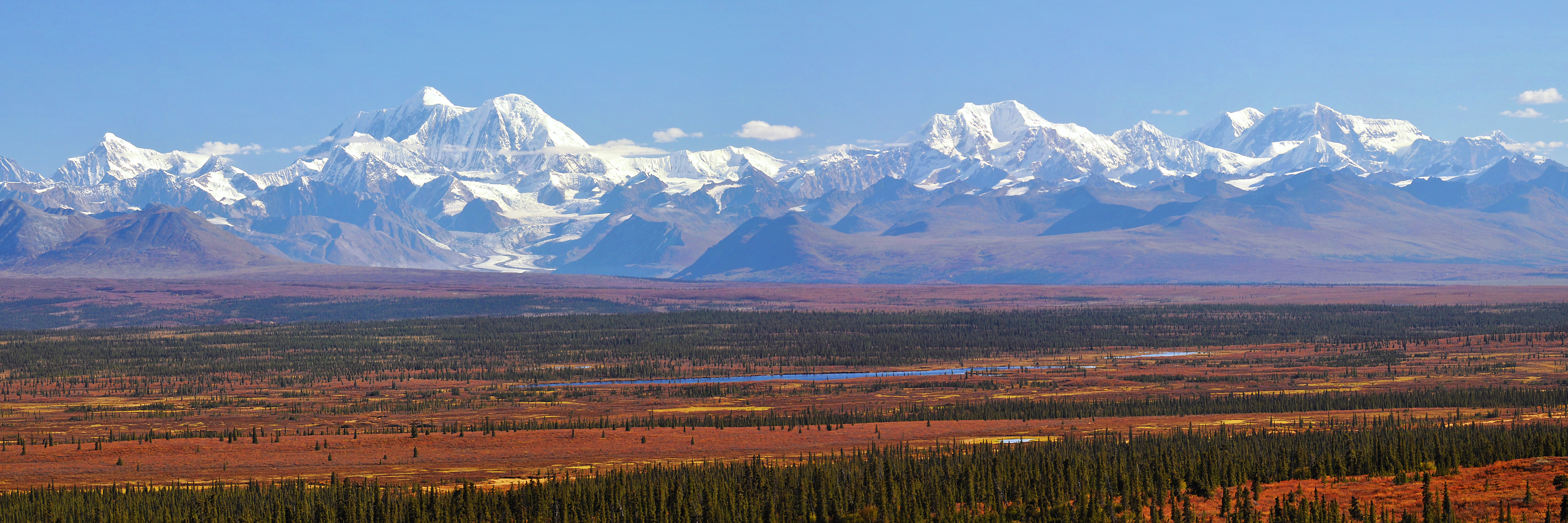
Hayes Range from the Denali Highway.
L→R: Mt. Balchen, Mt. Hayes, Moby Dick, Mt. Shand

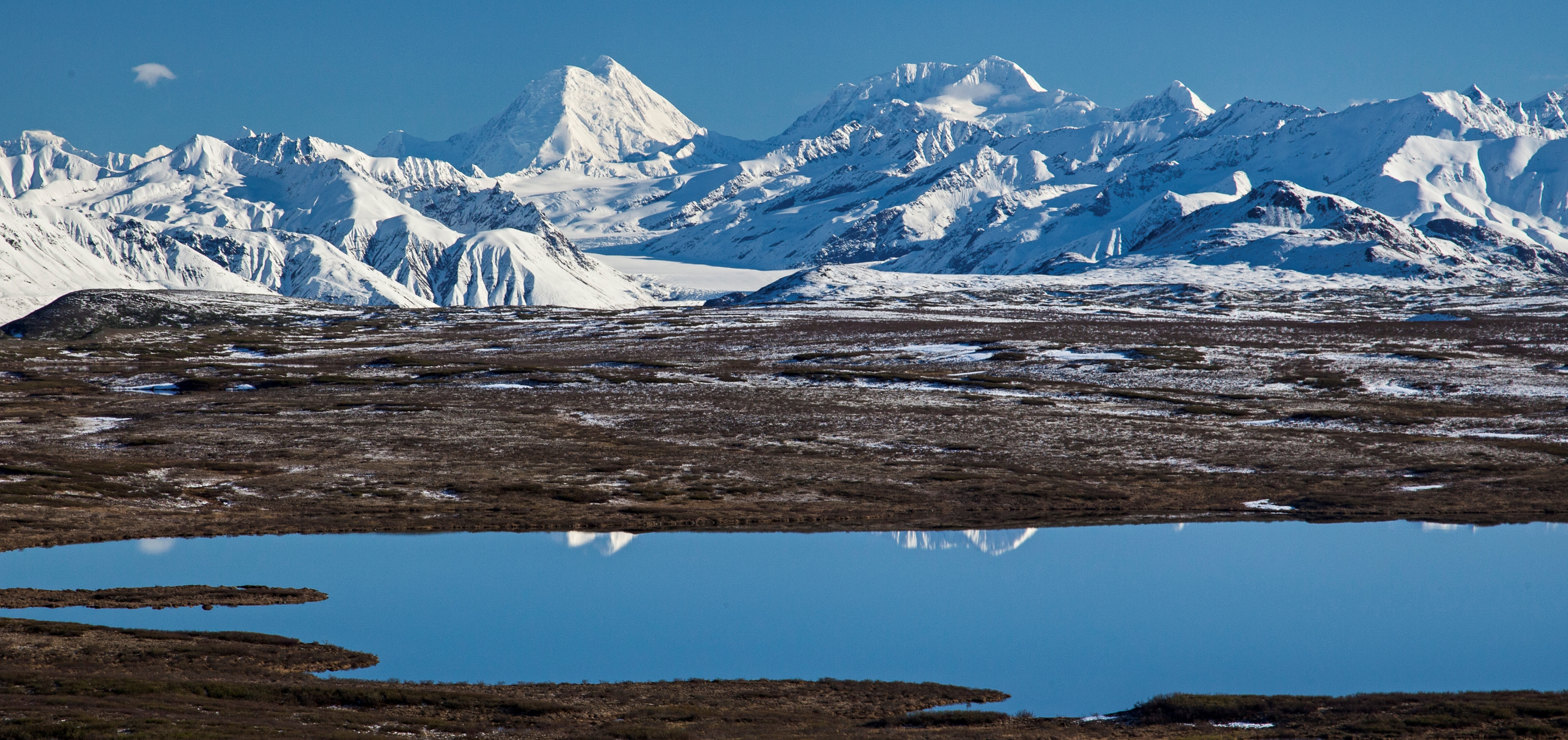
Mt. Hayes and Moby Dick

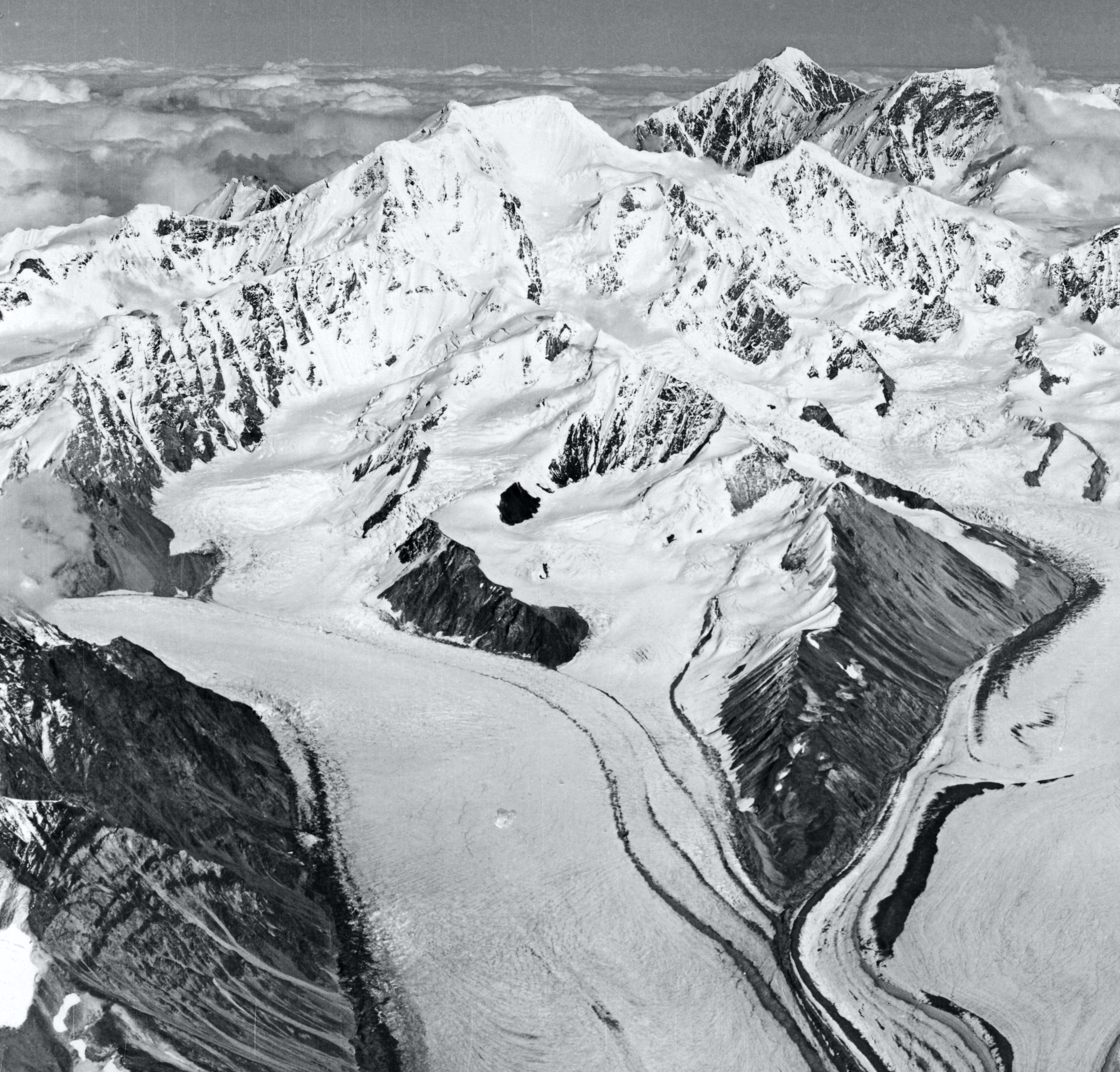
Aerial view looking east, Moby Dick centered with Susitna Glacier. Mts. Moffit and Shand upper right

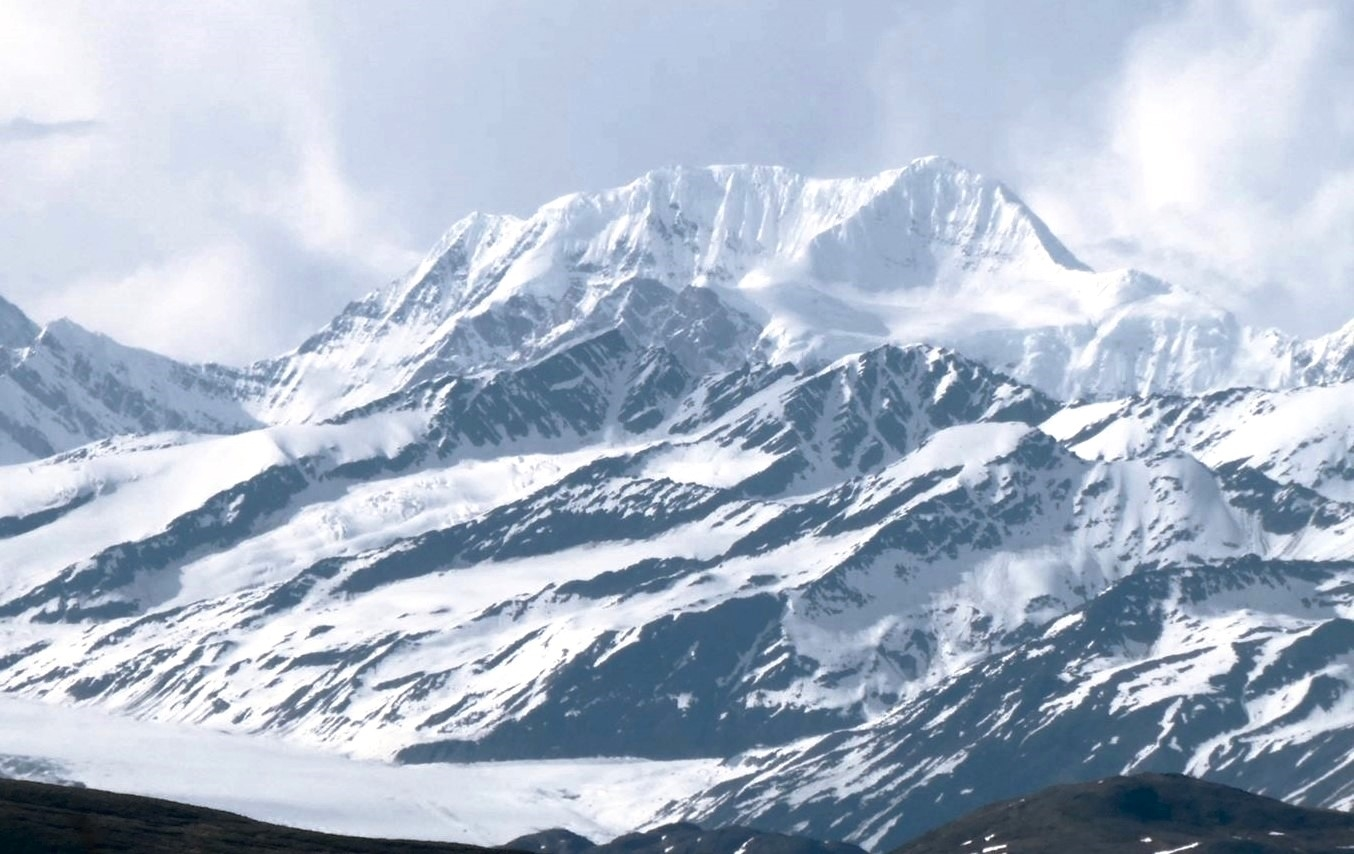
Moby Dick

== See also ==
- List of the highest major summits of the United States (#156)
- List of mountain peaks of Alaska (#34)
- Geology of Alaska
- Moby Dick (whale)
