= Broad Pass, Alaska =

Highway mountain pass in Alaska Range

Broad Pass
- Interactive map of Broad Pass
- Elevation: 2,330 ft (710 m)
- Traversed by: Parks Highway

Location
- Location: Matanuska-Susitna Borough, Alaska, US
- Range: Alaska Range
- Coordinates: 63°18′45″N 149°8′39″W
- Topo map: USGS Healy A-5, B-4, B-5

Broad Pass is an approximately 15-mile long (Note: Using the boundaries defined in) gap in the Alaska Range. It is a highway corridor for the Parks Highway and is roughly halfway between Fairbanks and Anchorage. The town of Cantwell is located at its northern boundary.

It separates the Alaska Range to the west and an unnamed subrange to the east.

== History ==
The area was known to Dena for millennia. The first recorded non-native expedition was done in 1898 by geologists George Homans Eldridge (Note: This person is not Civil War Veteran George H. Eldridge.) and Robert Muldrow of the USGS. They also recorded the area's geology and topography, which led to railway plans in 1902. Consequentially, the Alaska Railroad was completed between Fairbanks and Anchorage in 1923. In 1971, the George Parks Highway was completed, and provided road access to the area.
