= Mount Moffit =

Mountain in Alaska, United States

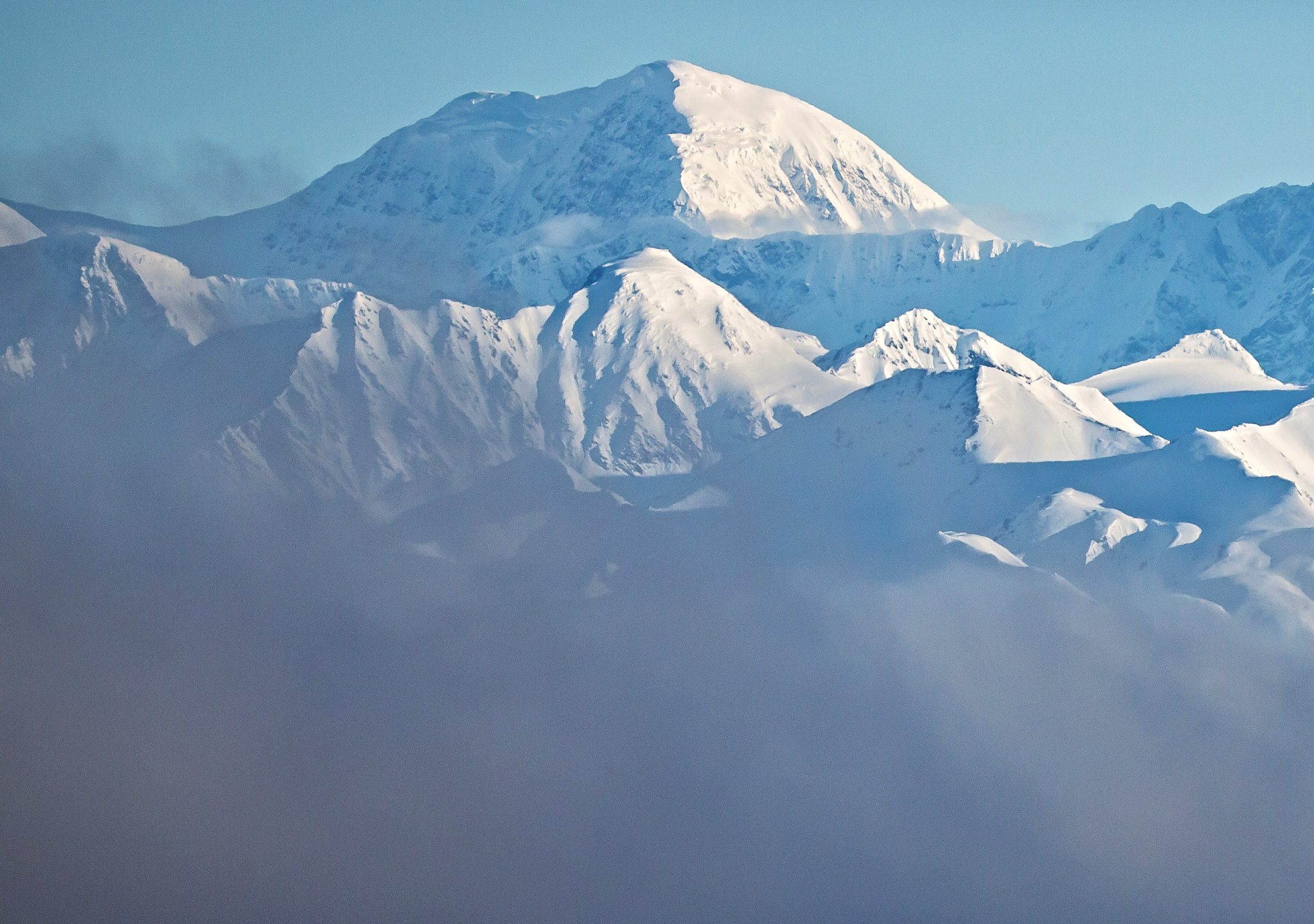
- Mount Moffit from the south

Highest point
- Elevation: 13,020 ft (3,970 m)
- Prominence: 3,970 ft (1,210 m)
- Coordinates: 63°34′06″N 146°23′55″W

Geography
- Location within Alaska
- Interactive map of Mount Moffit
- Location: Southeast Fairbanks Census Area, Alaska, U.S.
- Parent range: Alaska Range

Climbing
- First ascent: August 12, 1942 by William Shand Jr., Benjamin Ferris Jr., and Sterling Hendricks

Mount Moffit is a peak in the Alaska Range in central Alaska, United States, about 10 miles (16 km) east-southeast of Mount Hayes. It is notable for its steep faces and large relief above local terrain. For example, the north face drops 7,400 feet in approximately 1.2 miles (2 km) horizontal distance.

William Shand Jr., Benjamin Ferris Jr., and Sterling Hendricks made the first ascent of Mount Moffit on August 12, 1942. All three had been part of the first ascent team for Mount Hayes the year before. Unfortunately, Shand died shortly after the climb in an unrelated car accident. It was proposed that his name be attached to this peak; however the name was mistakenly attached to a slightly lower peak to the south of Mount Moffit. This mountain was named in 1950 by the U.S. Geological Survey for Fred Howard Moffit (1874–1958) who, as a geologist with the Alaskan Branch of U.S.Geological Survey, worked in Alaska from 1903 through 1943 and authored over fifty publications devoted to Alaskan geology and mining.

Mount Moffit is not often climbed due to difficult access. The second ascent of the peak was 33 years after the first, in 1975, by M. Sallee and D. Buchanan. The standard route is the Northwest Ridge (or "Western North Ridge"); this is a serious route (Alaska Grade 4) with typical Alaskan features such as highly corniced ridgelines.

The North Face of Mount Moffit was first climbed in 1989 by Brian Teale and Harvey Miller.

== Climate ==
Based on the Köppen climate classification, Mount Moffit is located in a subarctic climate zone with long, cold, snowy winters, and mild summers. This climate supports the Trident Glacier surrounding this peak. Winter temperatures can drop below −20 °C with wind chill factors below −30 °C. The months May through June offer the most favorable weather for climbing or viewing. Precipitation runoff from the mountain drains into tributaries of the Tanana River drainage basin.

== Gallery ==
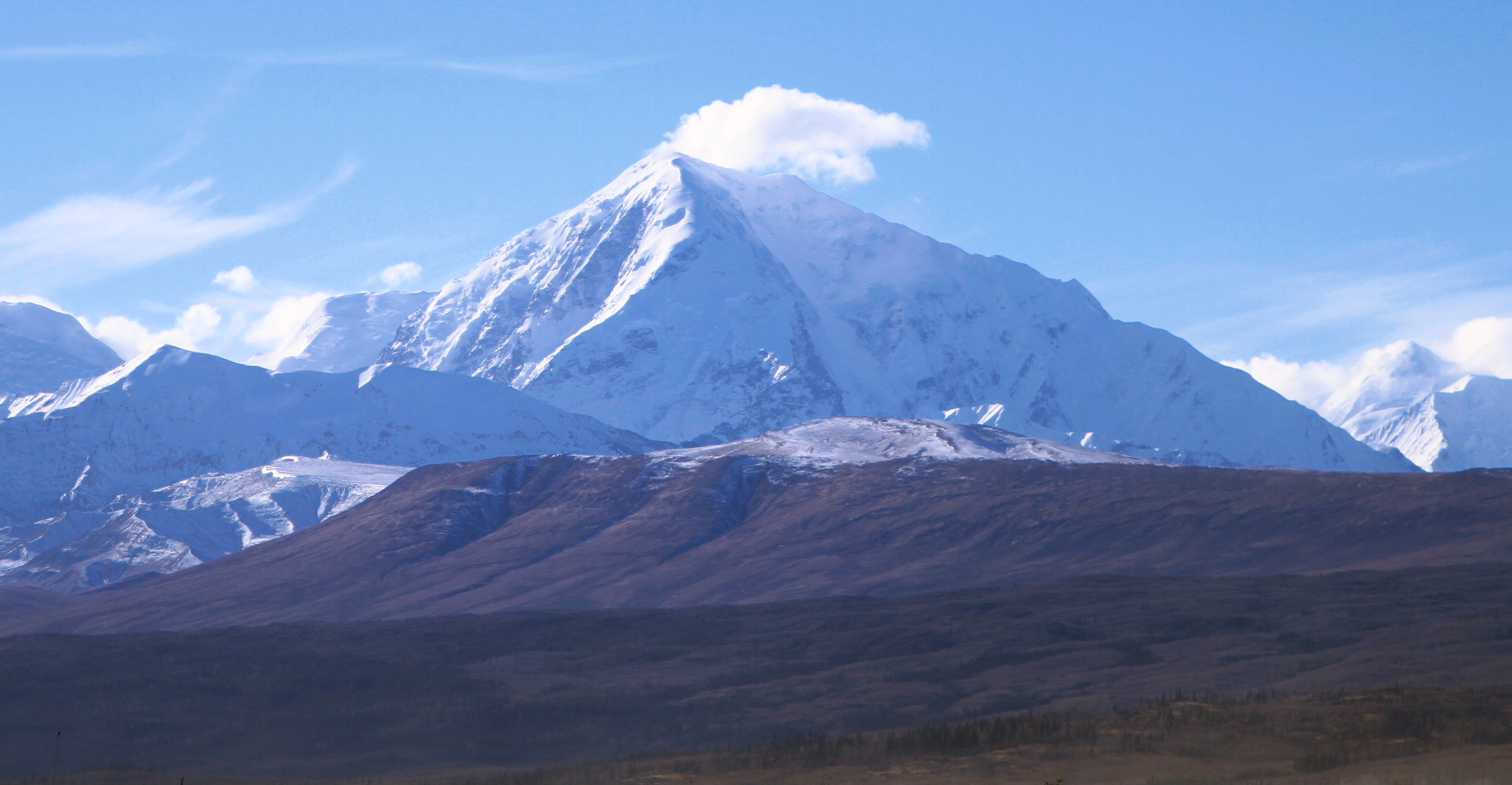
Northeast aspect

Fred Howard Moffit, 1905

== Sources ==
- Michael Wood and Colby Coombs, Alaska: a climbing guide, The Mountaineers, 2001.
