= Mount Shand =

Mountain in Alaska, United States

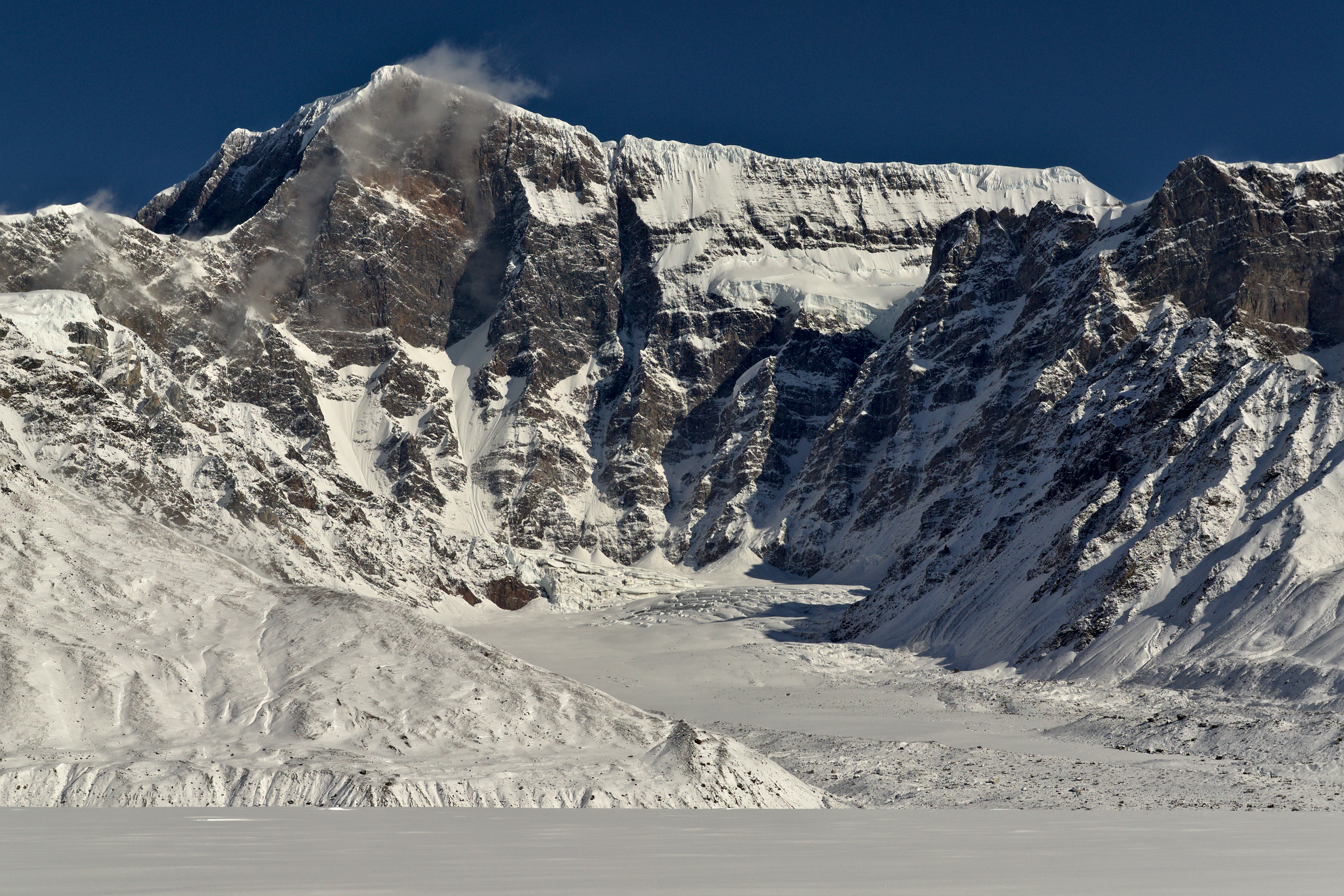
- Mount Shand from the south

Highest point
- Elevation: 12,660 ft (3,860 m)
- Prominence: 1,560 ft (480 m)
- Parent peak: Mount Moffit (13,020 ft)
- Isolation: 2.23 mi (3.59 km)
- Coordinates: 63°32′39″N 146°27′01″W

Geography
- Location within Alaska
- Interactive map of Mount Shand
- Location: Southeast Fairbanks Census Area; Alaska, United States
- Parent range: Alaska Range; Hayes Range
- Topo map: USGS Mount Hayes C-5

Mount Shand is a 12,660 ft (3,860 m) elevation glaciated summit located at the head of the Trident Glacier in the eastern Alaska Range, in Alaska, United States. It is the third-highest peak in the Hayes Range, a subset of the Alaska Range. This remote peak is situated 9.8 mi (16 km) east-southeast of Mount Hayes, and 93 mi (150 km) southeast of Fairbanks. Mount Moffit, the nearest higher neighbor, is set 2.3 mi (4 km) to the northeast, and McGinnis Peak is positioned 4.5 mi (7 km) to the east. This rarely climbed mountain has three large sweeping faces, the East, West, and South.

This mountain is named for William Shand Jr. (1918–1946), a mountaineer who made the first ascents of nearby Mount Moffit in August 1942, and Mount Hayes on August 1, 1941. Following Shand's untimely death in a tragic car crash, Bradford Washburn, also of the Hayes first ascent party, proposed this name in 1949 to be applied to what is now called Mount Moffit. The present application of the name was suggested in 1961 by the U.S. Geological Survey to resolve the conflict of two names applied to the same geographic feature. The name and summit location was officially adopted in 1962 by the U.S. Board on Geographic Names.

== Climate ==
Based on the Köppen climate classification, Mount Shand is located in a subarctic climate zone with long, cold, snowy winters, and mild summers. This climate supports the Trident and Black Rapids Glaciers surrounding this peak. Temperatures can drop below −20 °C with wind chill factors below −30 °C. The months May through June offer the most favorable weather for climbing or viewing. Precipitation runoff from the mountain drains into tributaries of the Tanana River drainage basin.

== Gallery ==
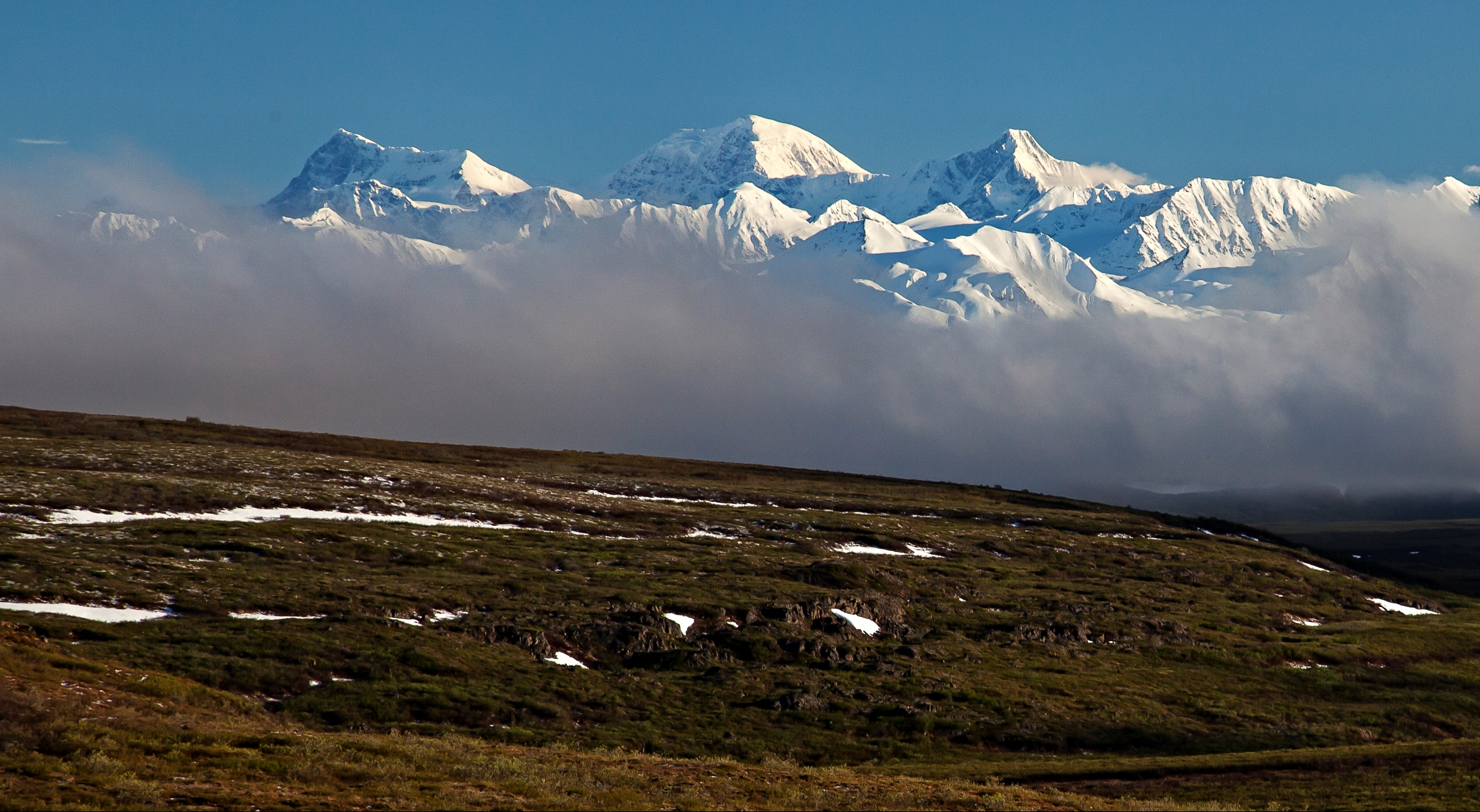
Mt. Shand (left), Mt. Moffit (center), McGinnis Peak (right)

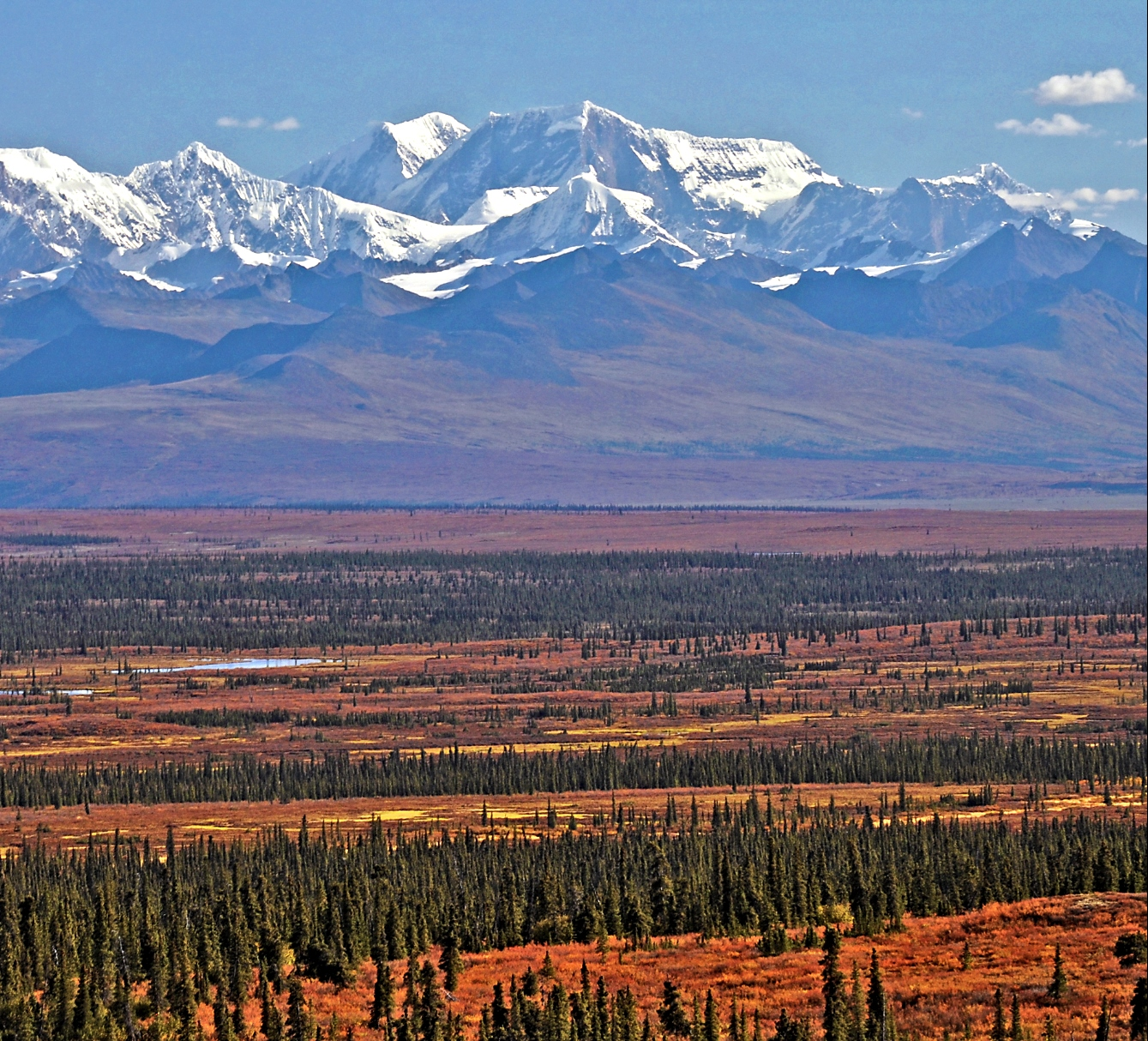
Mt. Shand from Denali Highway

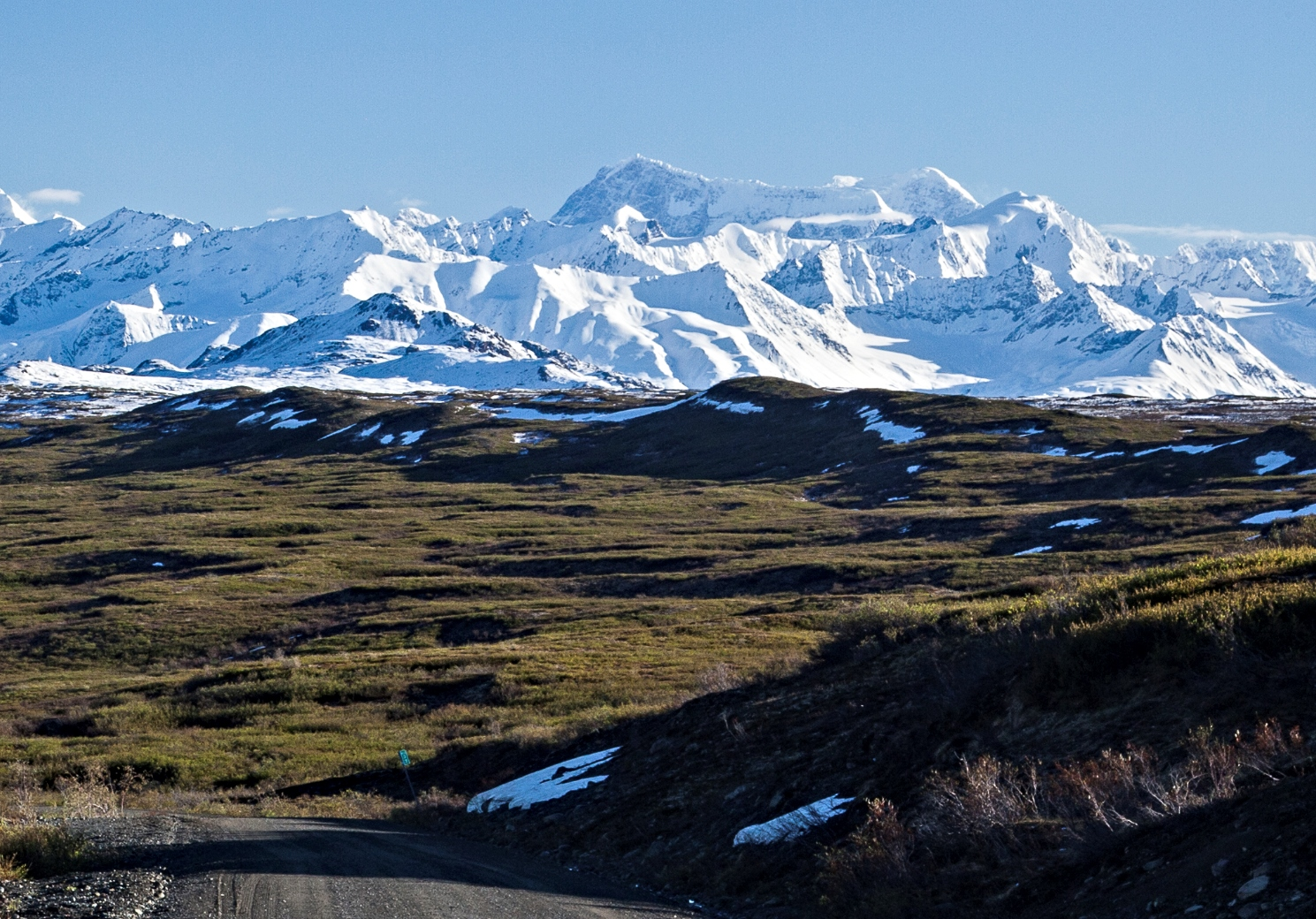
Mt. Shand centered in the distance

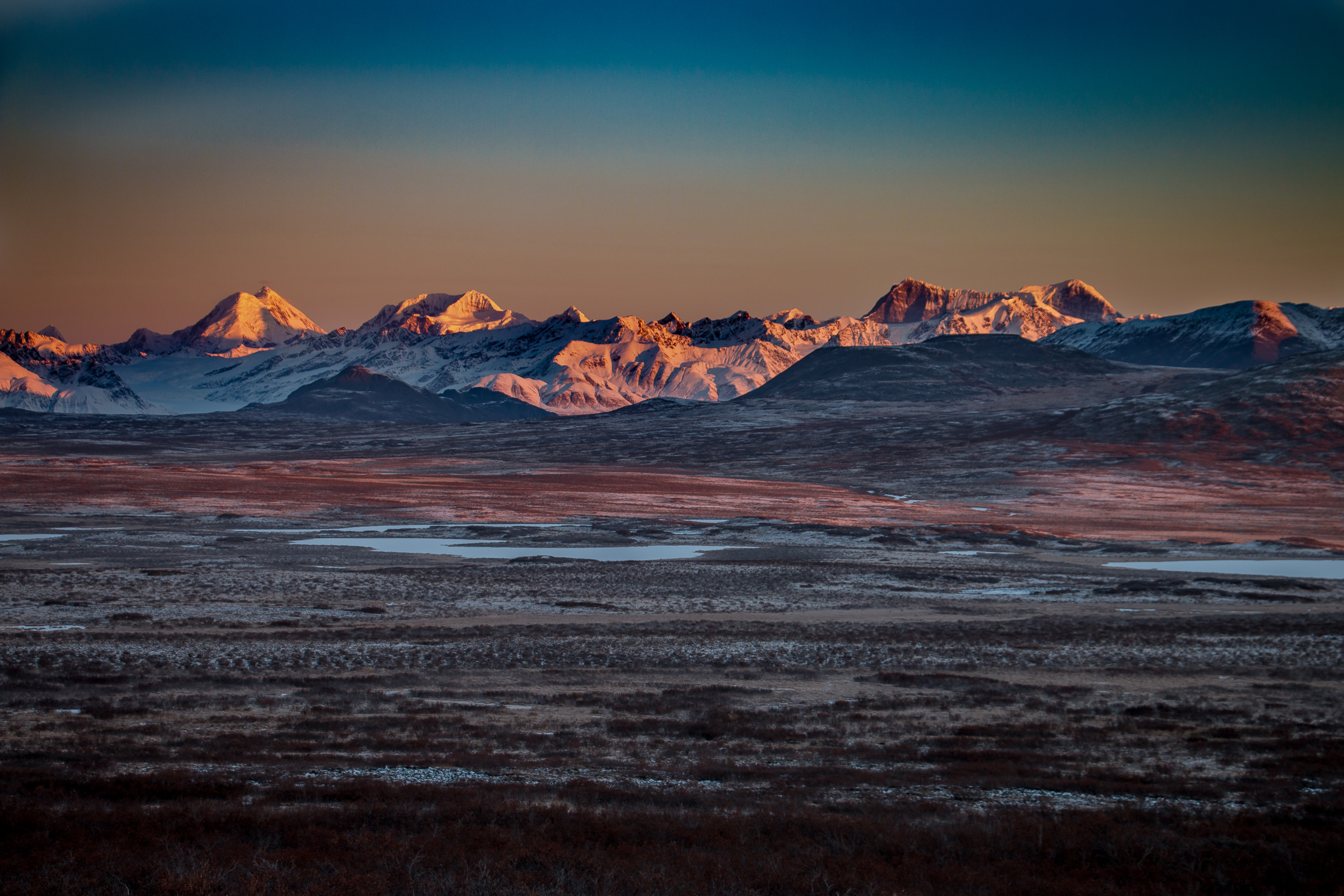
Left to right: Hayes, Moby Dick, Shand, Moffit

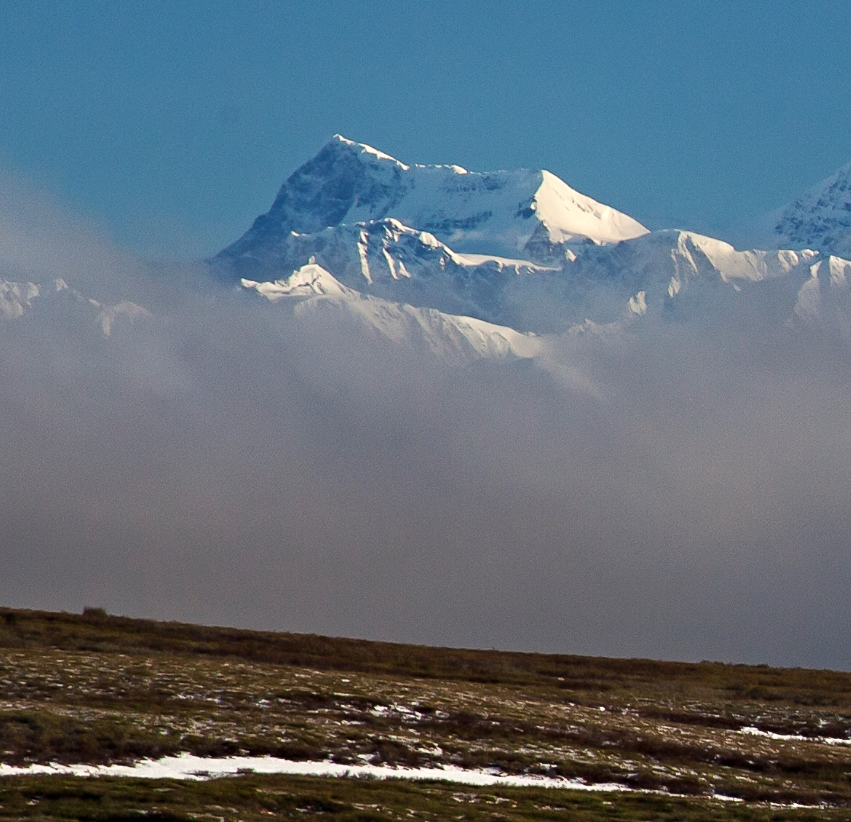
Mount Shand from the southeast

== See also ==
- List of mountain peaks of Alaska
- Geology of Alaska
