= Mount Deborah =

Mountain in Alaska, United States

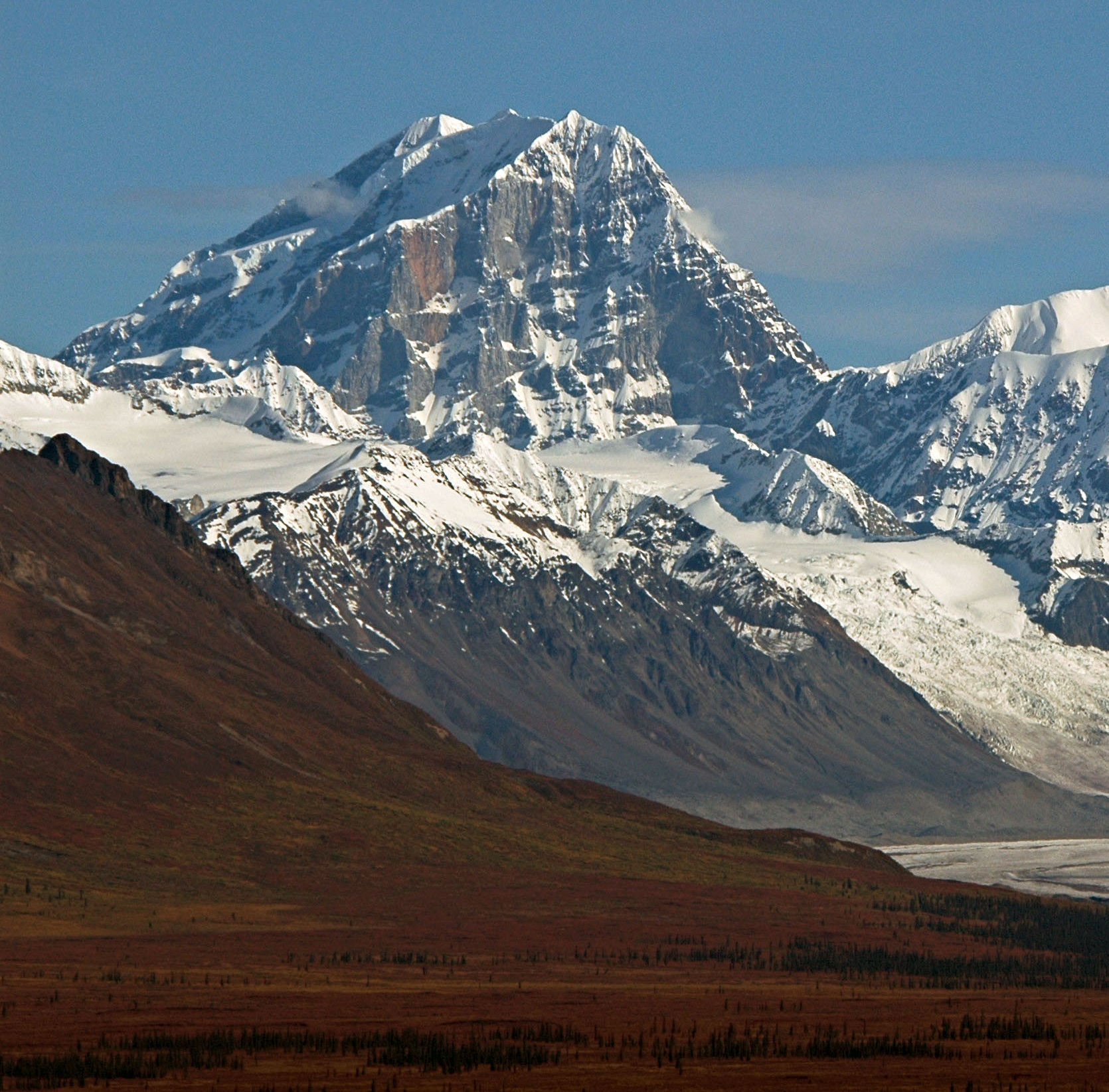

Highest point
- Elevation: 12,339 ft (3,761 m) NGVD 29
- Prominence: 5,139 ft (1,566 m)
- Listing: US most prominent peaks 114th
- Coordinates: 63°38′15″N 147°14′14″W

Geography
- Location within Alaska
- Interactive map of Mount Deborah
- Location: Denali Borough, Alaska, U.S.
- Parent range: Eastern Alaska Range
- Topo map: USGS Healy C-1

Climbing
- First ascent: 1954 by Fred Beckey, Henry Meybohm, Heinrich Harrer
- Easiest route: snow/ice climb

Mount Deborah is a mountain in the U.S. state of Alaska. It is one of the major peaks of the eastern Alaska Range. Despite its low absolute elevation (compared to other major peaks in North America), it is a particularly large and steep peak in terms of its quick rise over local terrain. For example, the Northeast Face rises 7,000 feet (2,100 m) in approximately 1.5 miles (2.4 km). This steepness, combined with difficult access, harsh weather, and classic Alaskan ice and snow features, make this a challenging peak to climb.

Mount Deborah was named in 1907 by James Wickersham for his first wife, Deborah Susan (Bell) Wickersham.

== First ascent ==
Mount Deborah was first climbed in 1954 by Fred Beckey, Henry Meybohm, Heinrich Harrer, via the South Ridge.

== Notable attempts and ascents ==
- 1953 South Ridge (attempt) by Al Paige, Howard Bowman, Brooke Marston, Doctor McFarland.
- 1964 East Ridge (attempt) by David Roberts and Don Jensen.
- 1975 West Buttress and South Ridge FA of route, 2nd of summit by Pat Condran, Mark Hottman, Brian Okonek, Dave Pettigrew, Pat Stuart and Toby Wheeler. Summit reached May 8 after 36 days of effort.
- 1976 Northwest Ridge FA of route, 3rd of summit by Rick Nolting, Barry Nash, John Cady, and Ray Watts, summit reached July 26.
- 1977 North Face FA of route by Dakers Gowans and Charles Macquarrie, summit reached May 8.

Today's standard route is the West Face; the Northwest Ridge is also a recommended route.

Mount Deborah is the subject of one of the classics of mountaineering literature, Deborah: A Wilderness Narrative, by David Roberts, which describes a failed attempt on the peak in 1964.

Deborah Avenue in College, Alaska is named for the mountain. Parallel to the street in the same subdivision is Hayes Avenue.

== See also ==
- List of mountain peaks of North America
  - List of mountain peaks of the United States
    - List of mountain peaks of Alaska
- List of Ultras of the United States
- Hess Mountain
