= Robert Muldrow =

American geologist and surveyor

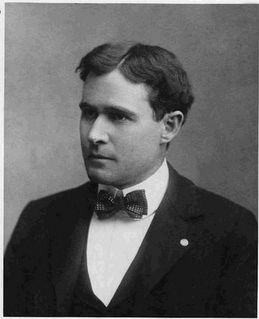
- Born: June 11, 1864; Oktibbeha County, Mississippi
- Died: July 28, 1950 (aged 87); Arlington, Virginia
- Occupation: Geologist
- Employer: US Geological Survey
- Known for: Co-founding the National Geographic Society

Robert Muldrow (June 11, 1864 – July 28, 1950) was an American geologist.

== Biography ==
Born on June 11, 1864, in Oktibbeha County, Mississippi, in 1887 Muldrow joined the US Geological Survey. In 1888 he was the youngest co-founder of the National Geographic Society. In 1898 he did the first scientific measurements of Denali (Mount McKinley), and had Muldrow Glacier named after him. He retired in 1927, and died in Arlington, Virginia, on July 28, 1950. Robert and his wife Elizabeth were laid to rest in Arlington National Cemetery.
