= Sterling B. Hendricks =

American agriculturist (1902–1981)

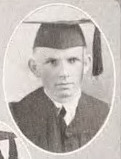
- Born: 1902
- Died: 1981 (aged 78–79)
- Occupation: Chemist
- Awards: Arthur L. Day Medal (1952); National Medal of Science (1975); Finsen Medal (1976)
- Position held: President of the Mineralogical Society of America (1954–1955)

Sterling Brown Hendricks (April 13, 1902 – January 4, 1981) was an American agriculturist notable for his research on the structural aspects of organic and inorganic chemistry, soil chemistry and plant physiology and nutrition. Hendricks was a member of the National Academy of Sciences, the American Academy of Arts and Sciences, the American Philosophical Society, and a recipient of the National Medal of Science from President Gerald Ford. The citation given to him at the medal ceremony said: "For the initiation of basic research in the physical and chemical properties of soils and proteins that have profoundly influenced agricultural practices and the production of food plants." Hendricks also was Chief Chemist, Beltsville Plant Industry Station, chief scientist of the Mineral Nutrition Laboratory, and a recipient of the Award for Distinguished Civilian Service.

Hendricks was also an accomplished mountaineer. The Sterling's Crack climb at Carderock Recreation Area is named for him. He accompanied an expedition to Denali in 1942, and accomplished at least fifty first ascents in British Columbia and Alaska.

== Sterling B. Hendricks Memorial Lectureship Award ==
The Sterling B. Hendricks Memorial Lectureship was established in 1981 by the Agricultural Research Service of the United States Department of Agriculture to honor the memory of Sterling B. Hendricks and to recognize scientists who have made outstanding contributions to the chemical science of agriculture (e.g., agricultural chemistry).
