= Mount Hayes =

Mountain in Alaska, United States

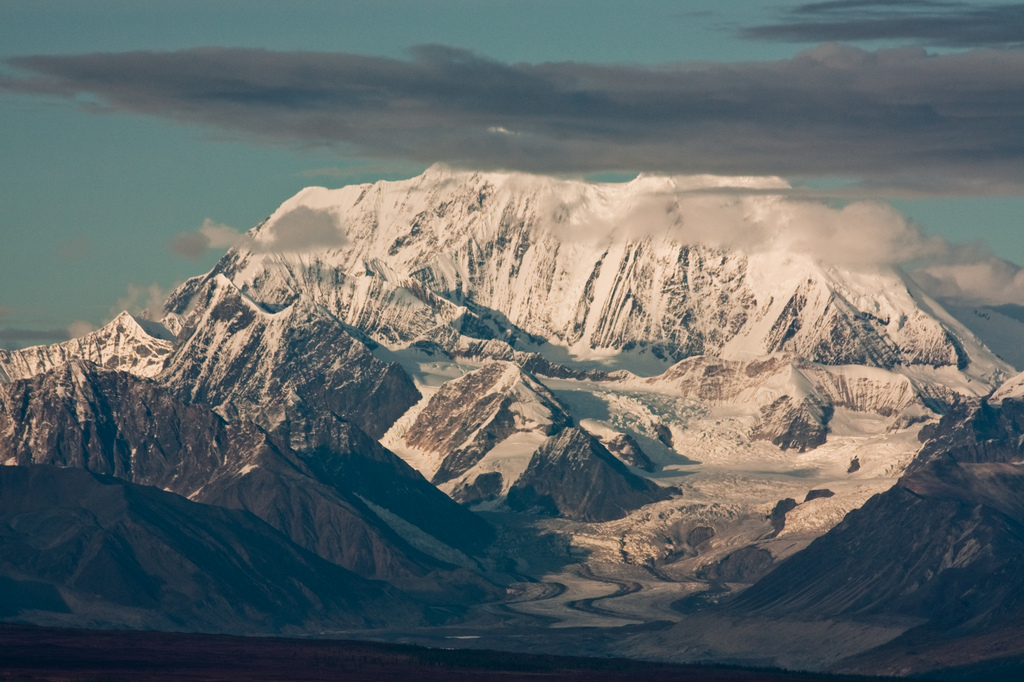

Highest point
- Elevation: 13,832 ft (4,216 m)
- Prominence: 11,487 ft (3,501 m)
- Listing: World most prominent peaks 51st; North America highest peaks 72nd; North America prominent peaks 10th; North America isolated peaks 102nd; US highest major peaks 54th; US most prominent peaks 6th; Alaska highest major peaks 17th
- Coordinates: 63°37′15″N 146°42′55″W

Geography
- Location within Alaska
- Interactive map of Mount Hayes
- Location: Southeast Fairbanks Census Area, Alaska, U.S.
- Parent range: Alaska Range
- Topo map: USGS Mount Hayes C-6

Climbing
- First ascent: 1941 by Bradford Washburn, Barbara Washburn, Benjamin Ferris, Sterling Hendricks, Henry Hall, William Shand
- Easiest route: snow/ice climb (Alaska grade 2+)

Mount Hayes is the highest mountain in the eastern Alaska Range, in the U.S. state of Alaska. Despite not being a fourteener, it is one of the largest peaks in the United States in terms of rise above local terrain. For example, the Northeast Face rises 8,000 feet (2,440 m) in approximately 2 miles (3.2 km). This large vertical relief contributes to Mount Hayes being the 51st most topographically prominent peak in the world.

The mountain was named in 1898 by W. J. Peters and A. H. Brooks of the U.S. Geological Survey for Charles Willard Hayes (1858–1916), a geologist with the Survey from 1887 through 1911.

On 29 July 1941 Bradford Washburn, Barbara Washburn, Benjamin Ferris, Sterling Hendricks, Henry Hall, and William Shand reached 12,650 ft. via the North Ridge but a storm was approaching and, with the summit only a little over 1000ft higher and just half a mile away, the party decided that they should descend to safety. On August 1, 1941 the party made another attempt, Hall remained in camp but the others were successful in making the first ascent of Mount Hayes. The route up the North Ridge wasn't repeated until 1975, it "is considered one of the great landmarks of Alaskan mountaineering because of its great technical difficulty at the time".

Today's standard climbing route is the East Ridge (Alaska Grade 2+). Mount Hayes is not frequently climbed due to its remoteness and the resulting access difficulties.

== Climate ==
Based on the Köppen climate classification, Mount Hayes is located in a subarctic climate zone with long, cold, snowy winters, and mild summers. Temperatures can drop below −20 °C with wind chill factors below −30 °C. This climate supports glaciers on its slopes including the Hayes Glacier. Precipitation runoff from the mountain drains into tributaries of the Tanana River drainage basin. The months May through June offer the most favorable weather for climbing or viewing.

== Gallery ==
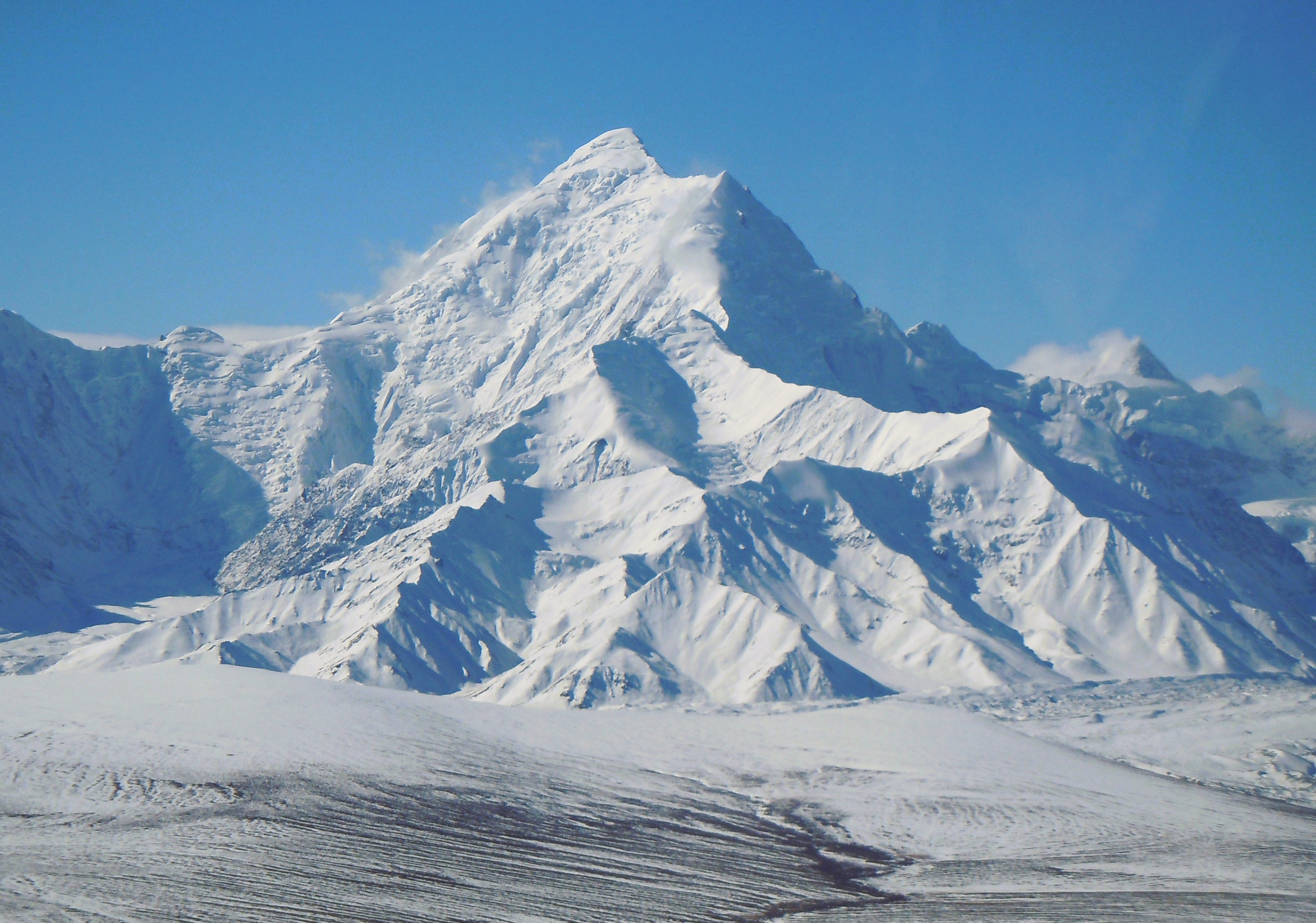
North aspect viewed from Molybdenum Ridge

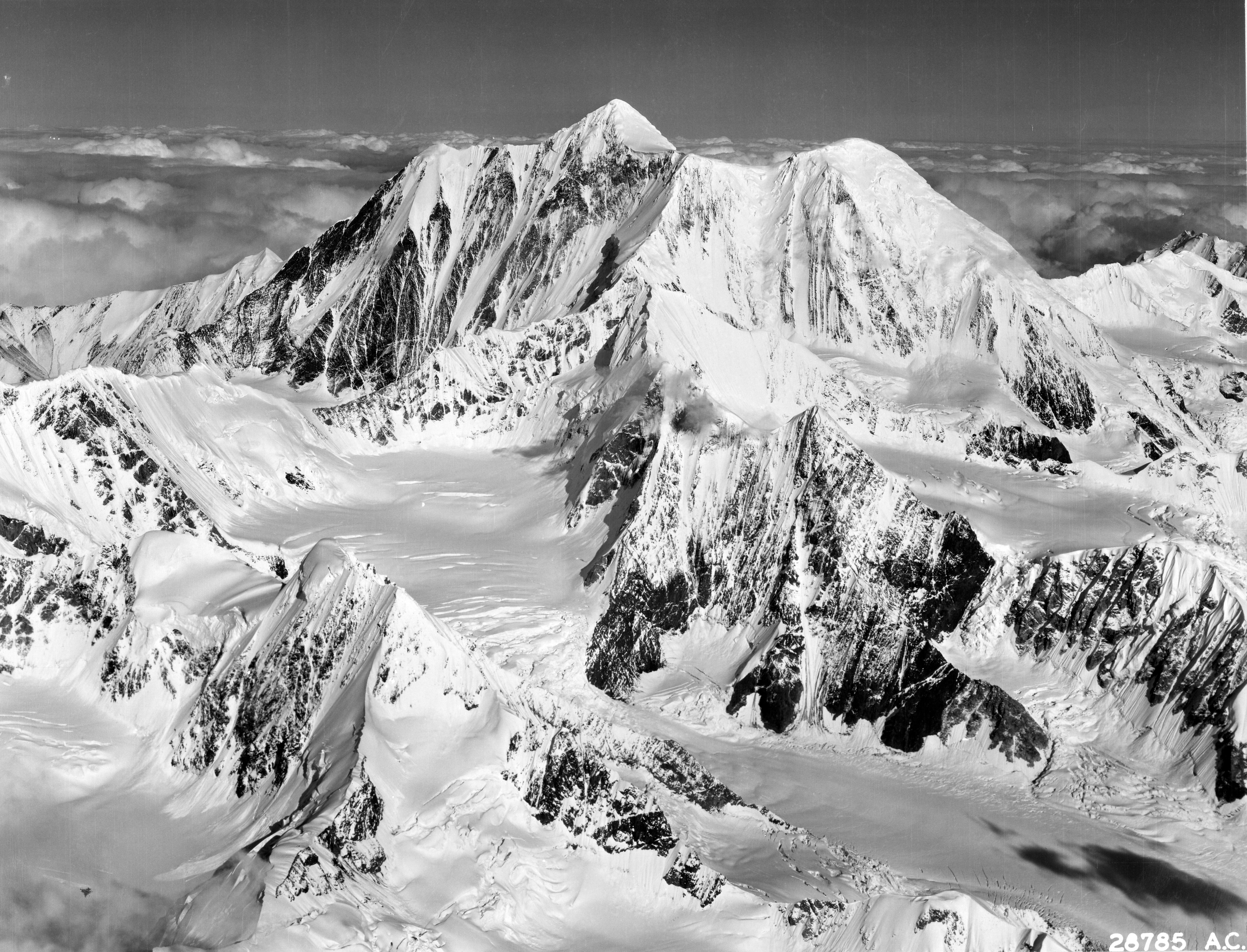
Aerial view

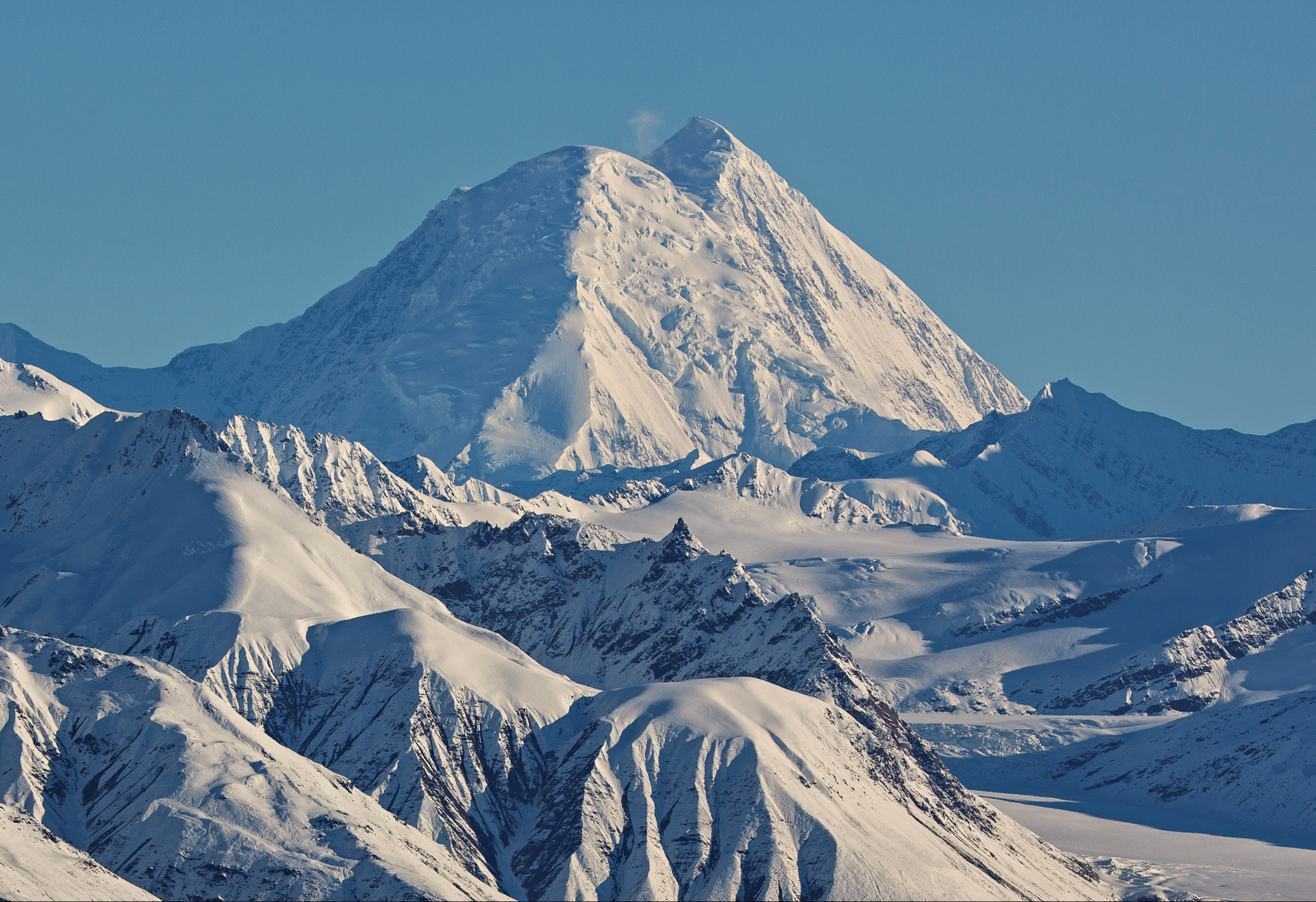
Mount Hayes from the south

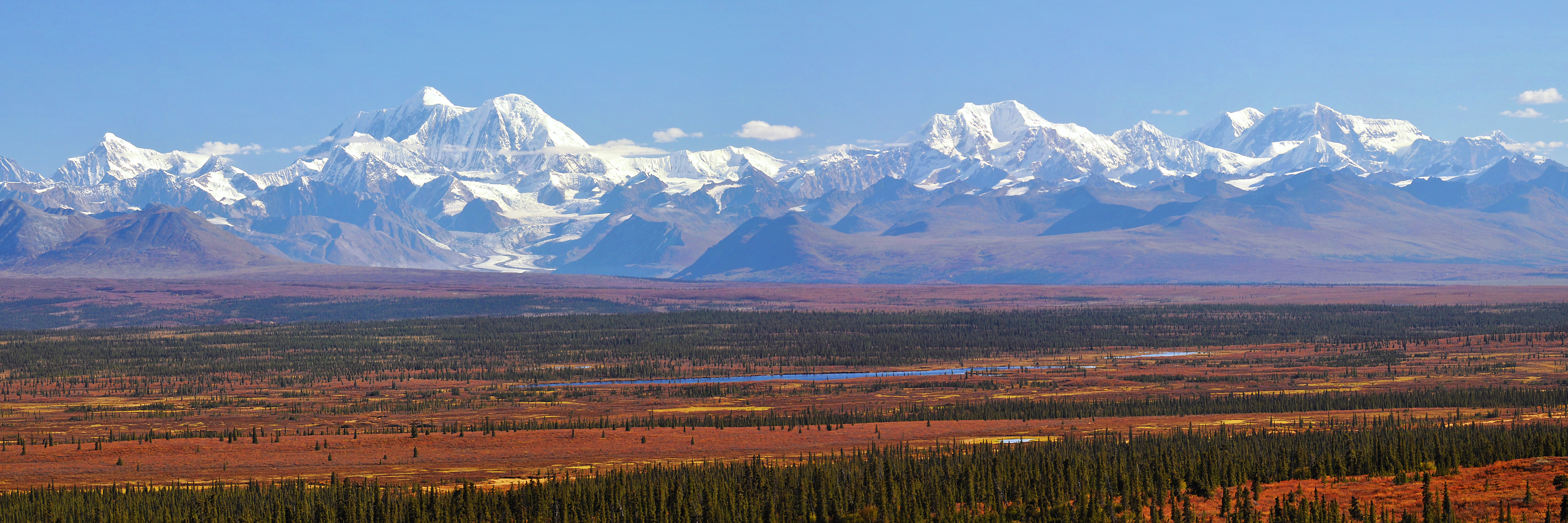
Mount Hayes and the eastern Alaska Range mountains, as seen from the Denali Highway, L→R: Mount Balchen, Mount Hayes, Moby Dick, Mount Shand

== See also ==
- List of mountain peaks of North America
  - List of mountain peaks of the United States
    - List of mountain peaks of Alaska
- List of Ultras of the United States

== Sources ==
Michael Wood and Colby Coombs, Alaska: A Climbing Guide, The Mountaineers, 2001.
