= Alaska Range =

North American mountain range

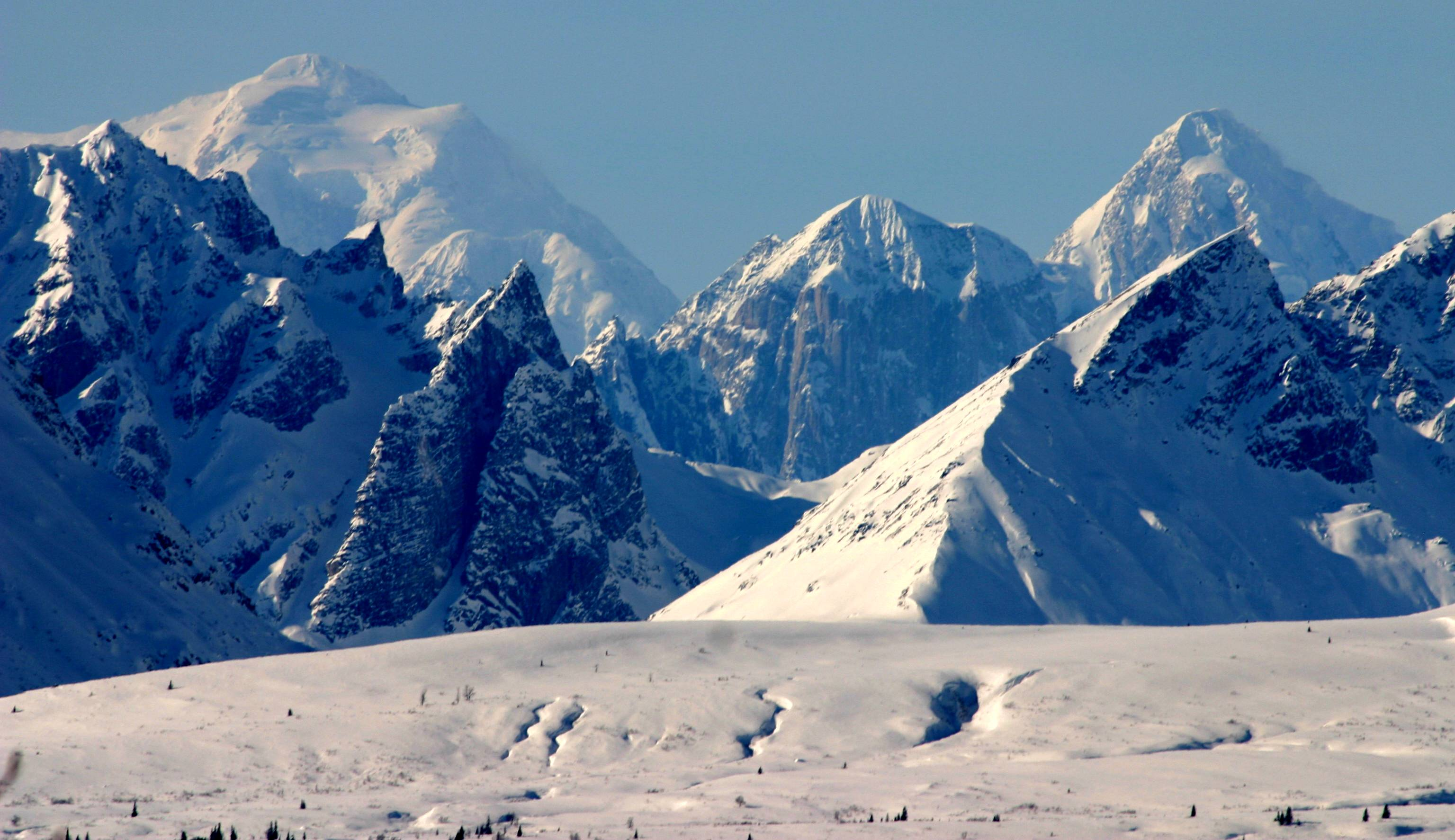
- Mount Hunter, Mount Huntington and other rugged peaks of the Alaska Range near Denali

Highest point
- Peak: Denali
- Elevation: 20,310 ft (6,190 m)
- Listing: List of mountain ranges
- Coordinates: 63°04′10″N 151°00′27″W

Geography
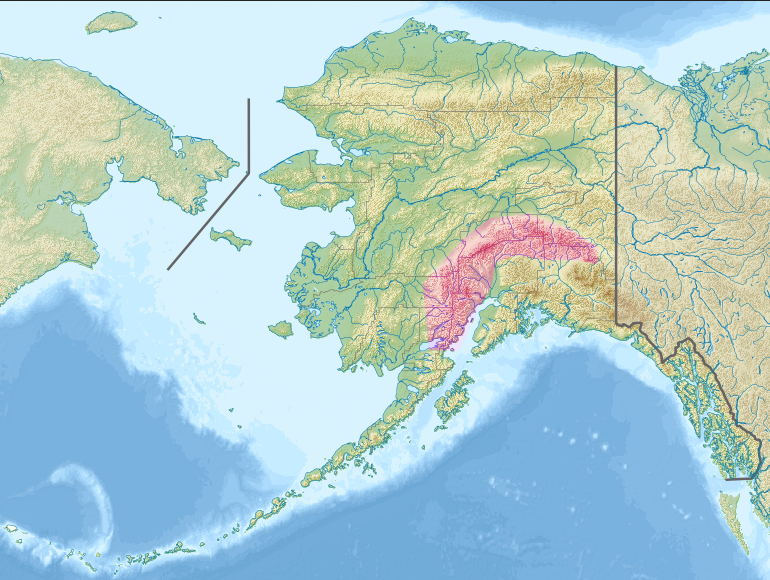
- Country: United States
- State: Alaska
- Parent range: American Cordillera
- Borders on: Pacific Coast Ranges

The Alaska Range is a relatively narrow, 600-mile-long (970-kilometer) mountain range in the southcentral region of the U.S. state of Alaska, from Lake Clark at its southwest end to the White River in Canada's Yukon Territory in the southeast. Denali, the highest mountain in North America, is in the Alaska Range. The range is part of the American Cordillera.

The Alaska Range is one of the highest mountain ranges in the world, after the Himalayas and the Andes.

== Description ==
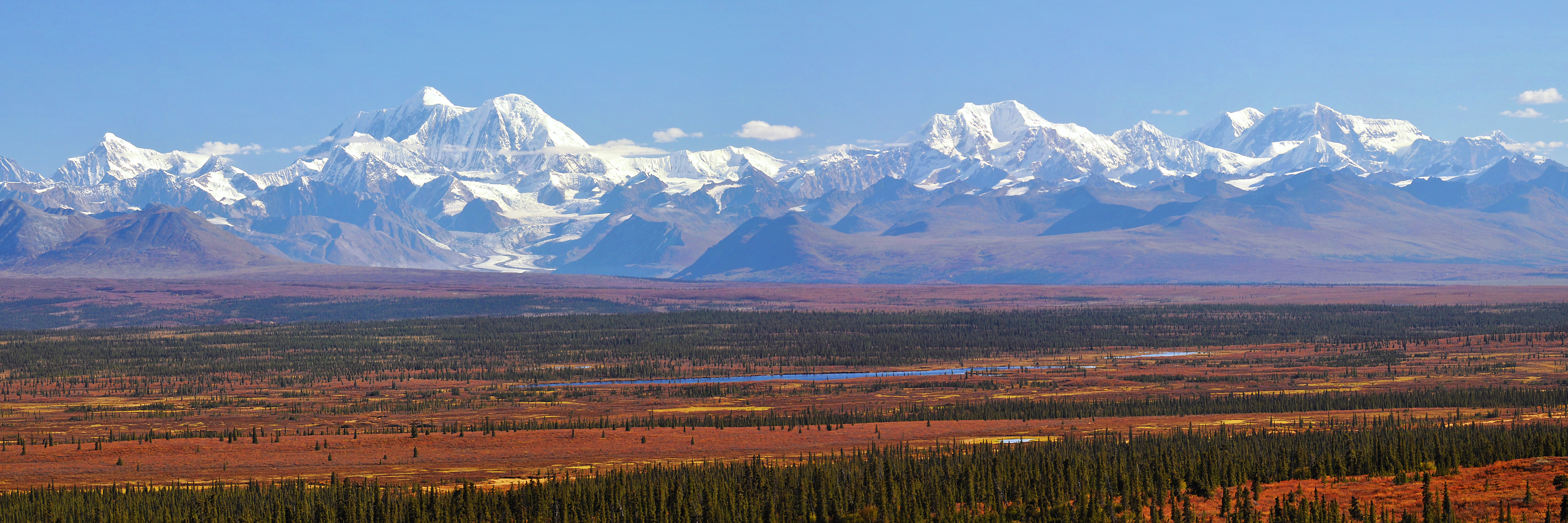
Mount Hayes and the eastern Alaska Range mountains

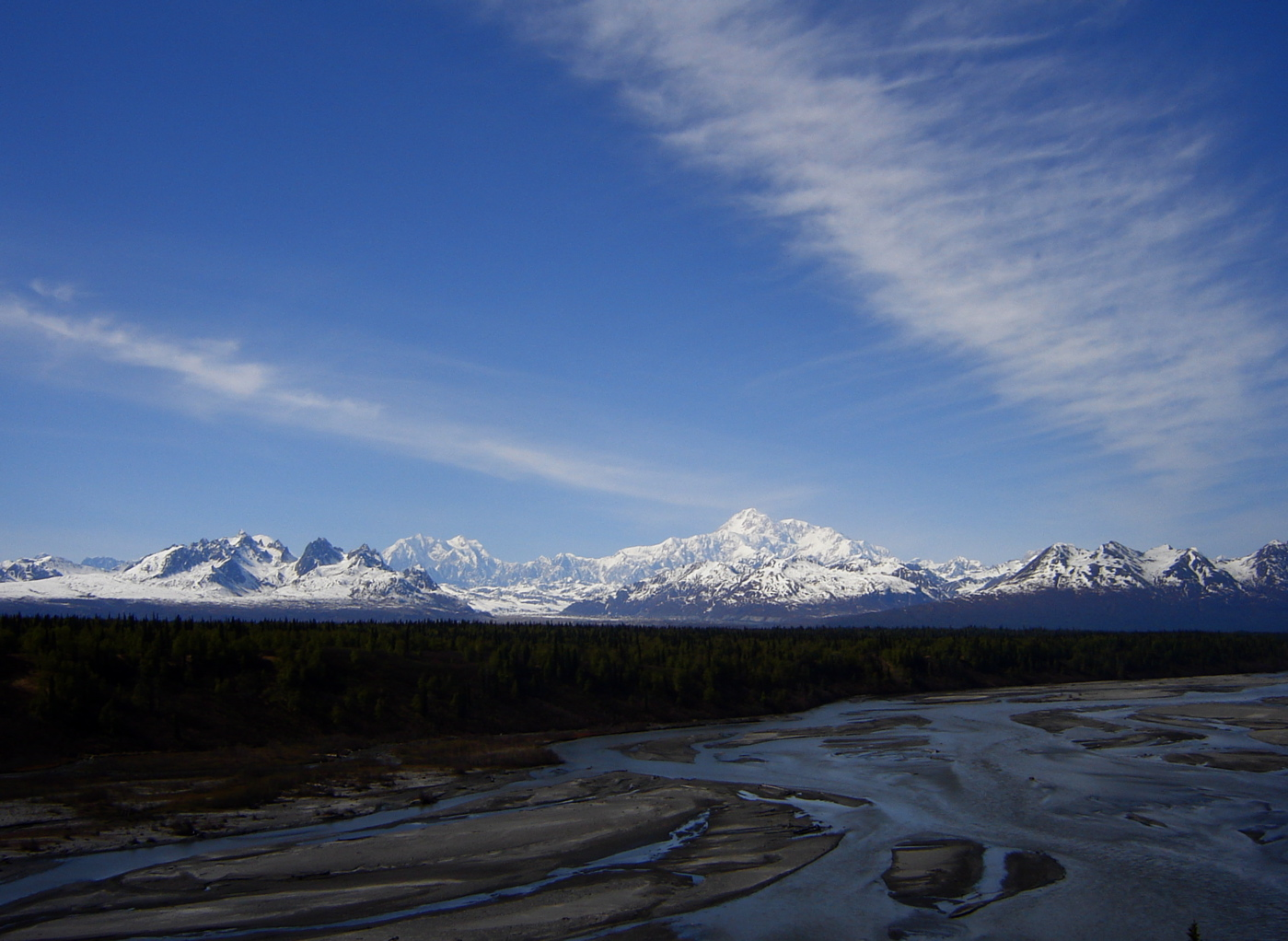
View from Denali State Park

The range forms a generally east–west arc with its northernmost part in the center, and from there trending southwest towards the Alaska Peninsula and the Aleutian Islands, and trending southeast into British Columbia and the Pacific Coast Ranges. The mountains act as a high barrier to the flow of moist air from the Gulf of Alaska northwards, and thus have some of the harshest weather in the world. The heavy snowfall also contributes to a number of large glaciers, including the Cantwell, Castner, Black Rapids, Susitna, Yanert, Muldrow, Eldridge, Ruth, Tokositna, and Kahiltna Glaciers. Four major rivers cross the Alaska Range, including the Delta and Nenana Rivers in the center of the range and the Nabesna and Chisana Rivers to the east.

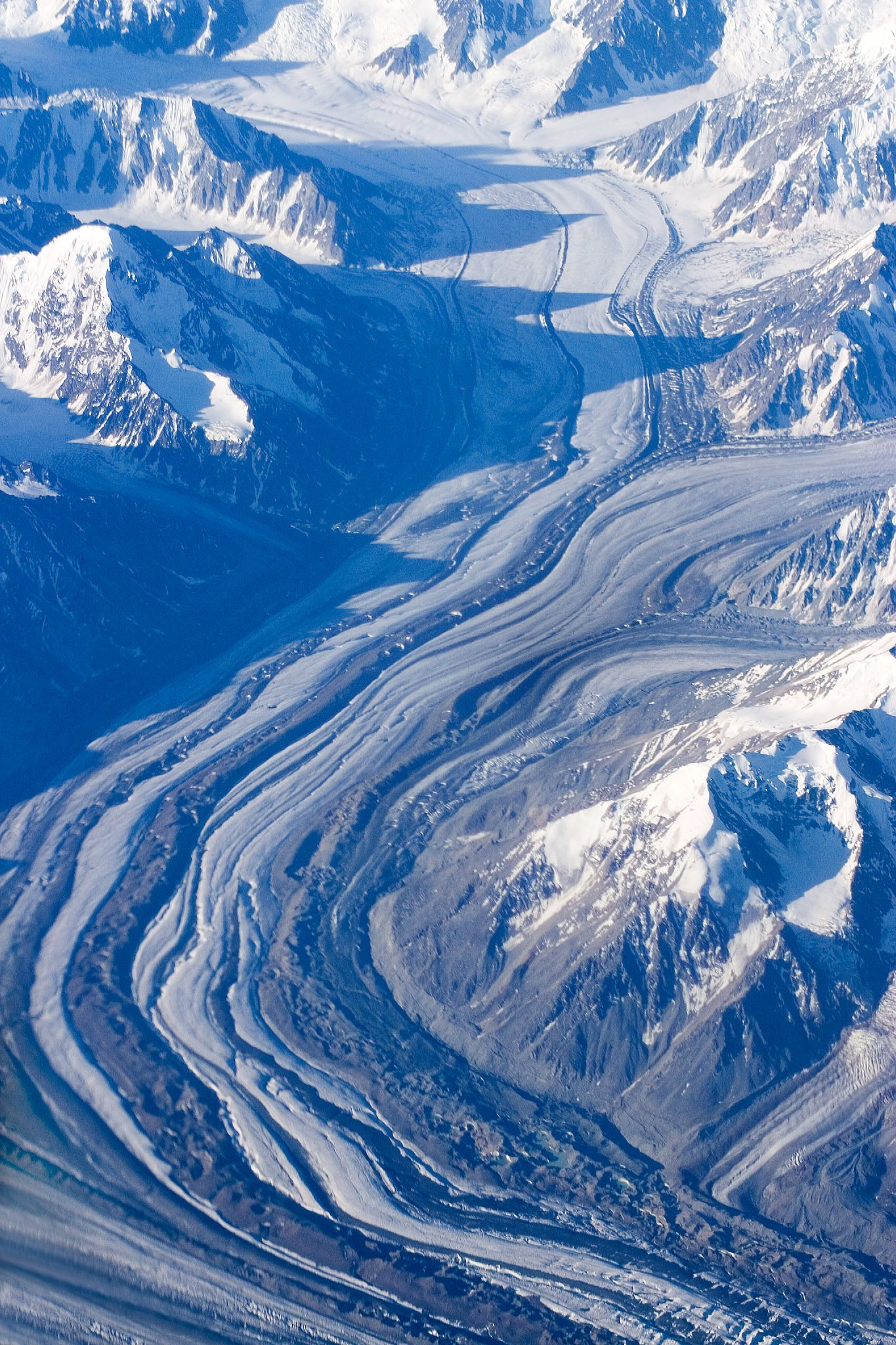
Alaska Range Glacier

The range is part of the Pacific Ring of Fire, and the Denali Fault that runs along its southern edge is responsible for many major earthquakes. Mount Spurr is a stratovolcano located at the northeastern end of the Aleutian Volcanic Arc which has two vents, the summit and nearby Crater Peak.

Parts of the Alaska Range are protected within Wrangell-St. Elias National Park and Preserve, Denali National Park and Preserve, and Lake Clark National Park and Preserve. Several highways cross through the passes of the range: the George Parks Highway from Anchorage to Fairbanks via Windy Pass, the Richardson Highway from Valdez to Fairbanks via Isabel Pass, and the Tok Cut-Off from Gulkana Junction to Tok, Alaska via Mentasta Pass. The Alaska Pipeline parallels the Richardson Highway. A part of the Alaska Highway is situated on the northern slopes of the eastern section of the range.

== History ==
The name "Alaskan Range" appears to have been first applied to these mountains in 1869 by naturalist W. H. Dall. The name eventually became "Alaska Range" through local use. In 1849 Constantin Grewingk applied the name "Tschigmit" to this mountain range. A map made by the United States General Land Office in 1869 calls the southwestern part of the Alaska Range the "Chigmit Mountains" and the northeastern part the "Beaver Mountains". However, the Chigmit Mountains are now considered part of the Aleutian Range.

Starting in the mid-1880s to early 1900s, early non-native explorers traversed various sections of the Alaska Range. The first recorded expedition was in the Eastern Alaska Range led by H. T. Allen in 1885. His team went from Suslota Lake to Tetlin Lake and unto the Tanana River via Miles Pass. He noted that it would be possible to build a road from Prince William Sound to the Yukon River. Six years later, Frederick Schwatka and Charles W. Hayes crossed the extreme eastern end of the range via the White River and into the Copper River basin through Skolai Pass in what is now called Saint Elias Mountains. In 1898, W. C. Mendenhall and E. F. Glenn traversed Isabel Pass and were within 15–20 miles of the Tanana River before turning around. Separately, that same year, Robert Muldrow and George Homans Eldridge crossed Broad Pass then Windy Pass into the Nenana River valley.

== Major peaks ==
Alaska Range from Tok

Name	Elevation (ft/m)	
Denali	20,310	6,190
Mount Foraker	17,400	5,300
Mount Hunter	14,573	4,442
Mount Hayes	13,832	4,216
Mount Silverthrone	13,218	4,029
Mount Moffit	13,020	3,970
Mount Deborah	12,339	3,761
Mount Huntington	12,240	3,730
Mount Brooks	11,890	3,620
Mount Russell	11,670	3,560

== Subranges (from west to east) ==
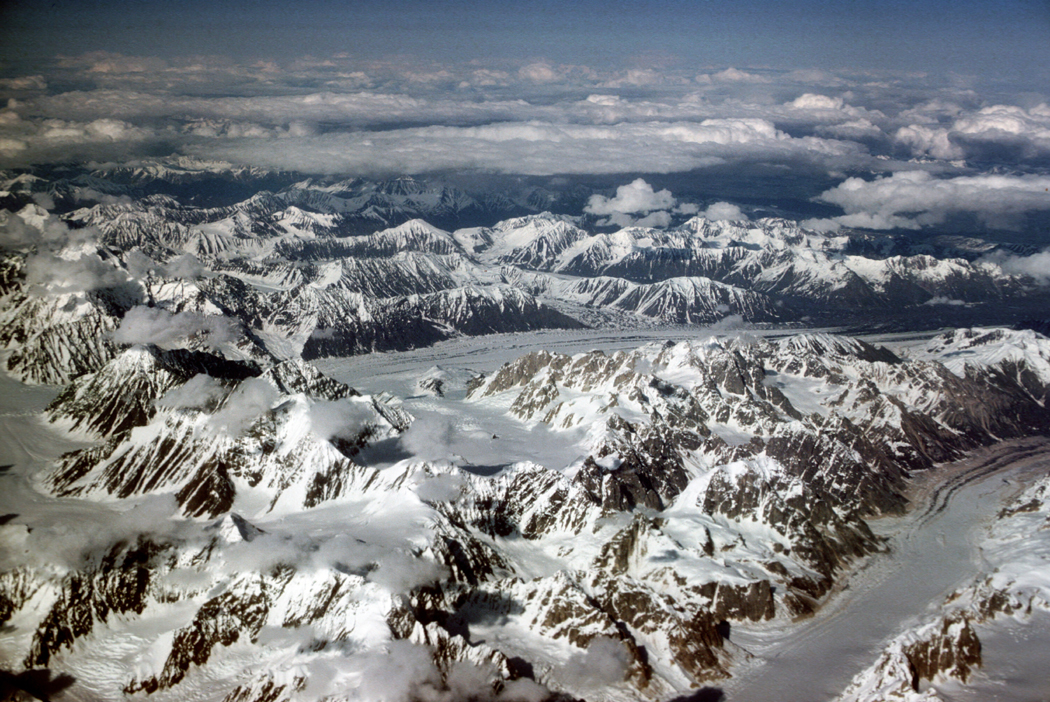
Alaska Range Mountain Peaks

- Neacola Mountains
- Revelation Mountains
- Teocalli Mountains
- Kichatna Mountains
- Central Alaska Range/Denali Massif
- Eastern Alaska Range/Hayes Range
- Delta Mountains
- Mentasta Mountains
- Nutzotin Mountains

== Documented wilderness traverses of Alaska Range ==
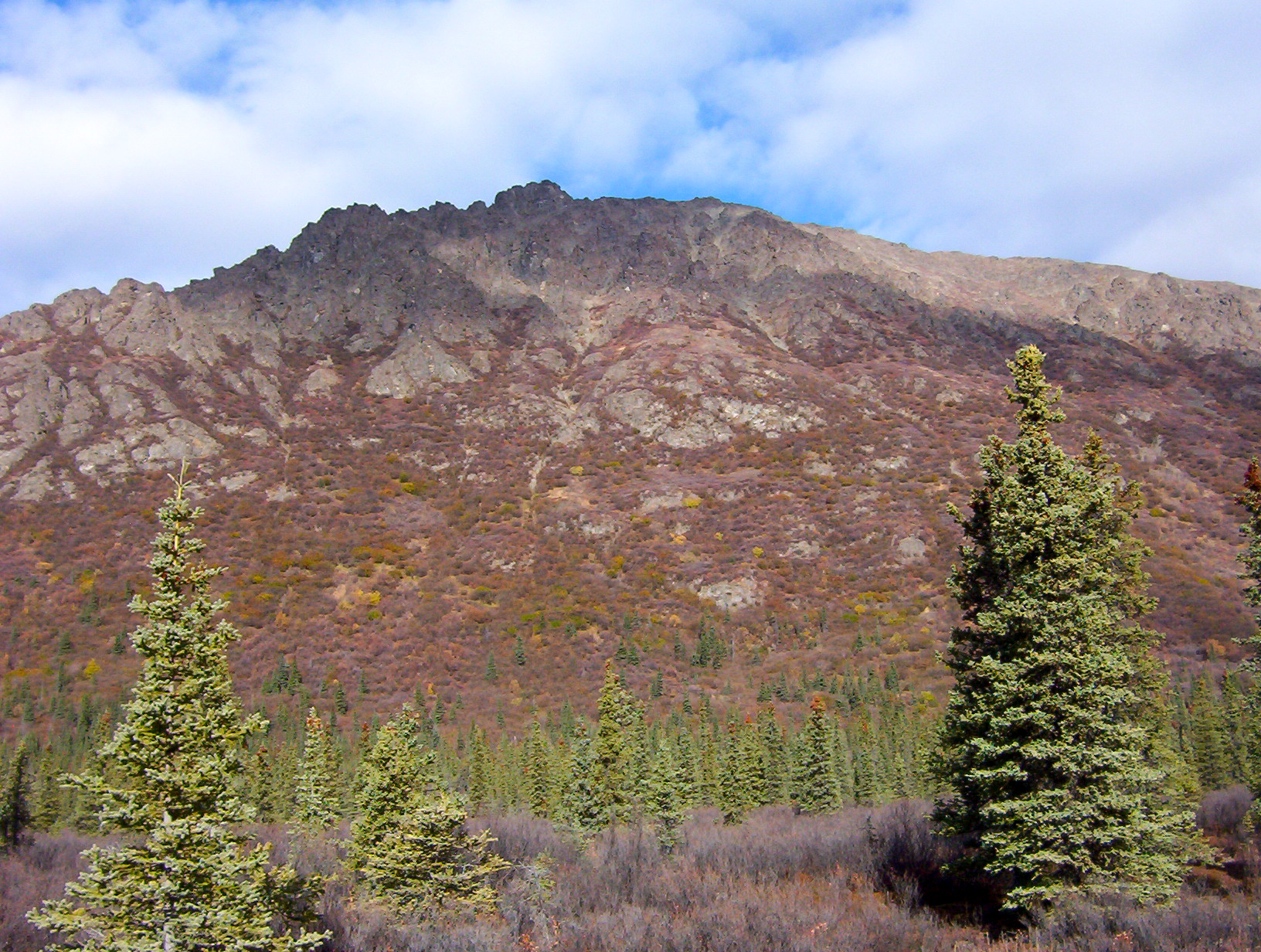
The Denali Highway passes through the Alaska Range and offers travelers a close up-look at some of the lower peaks

- Mentasta Lake to Kitchatna Mountains (1981): Scott Woolums, George Beilstein, Steve Eck, and Larry Coxen by skis: first traverse. 375 miles (604 km) in 45 days.
- Canada to Lake Clark (1996): Roman Dial, Carl Tobin, and Paul Adkins by mountain bike and packraft: first full-length traverse. 775 miles (1,247 km) in 42 days.
- Tok to Lake Clark (1996): Kevin Armstrong, Doug Woody, and Jeff Ottmers by snowshoe, foot, and packraft: first foot traverse. 620 miles (1,000 km) in 90 days.
- Lake Clark to Mentasta Lake (2016): Gavin McClurg by paraglider and foot: first vol-biv (fly/camp) traverse. 466 miles (750 km) in 37 days.
- Cantwell/Yakutat to Unimak Island (2020): Quoc Nguyen and Dan Binde by foot and packraft. 2,500 miles (4,000 km) in 120 days.

== See also ==
- Summit Lake, Alaska
