= Abercrombie Mountain =

Mountain in Washington (state), United States

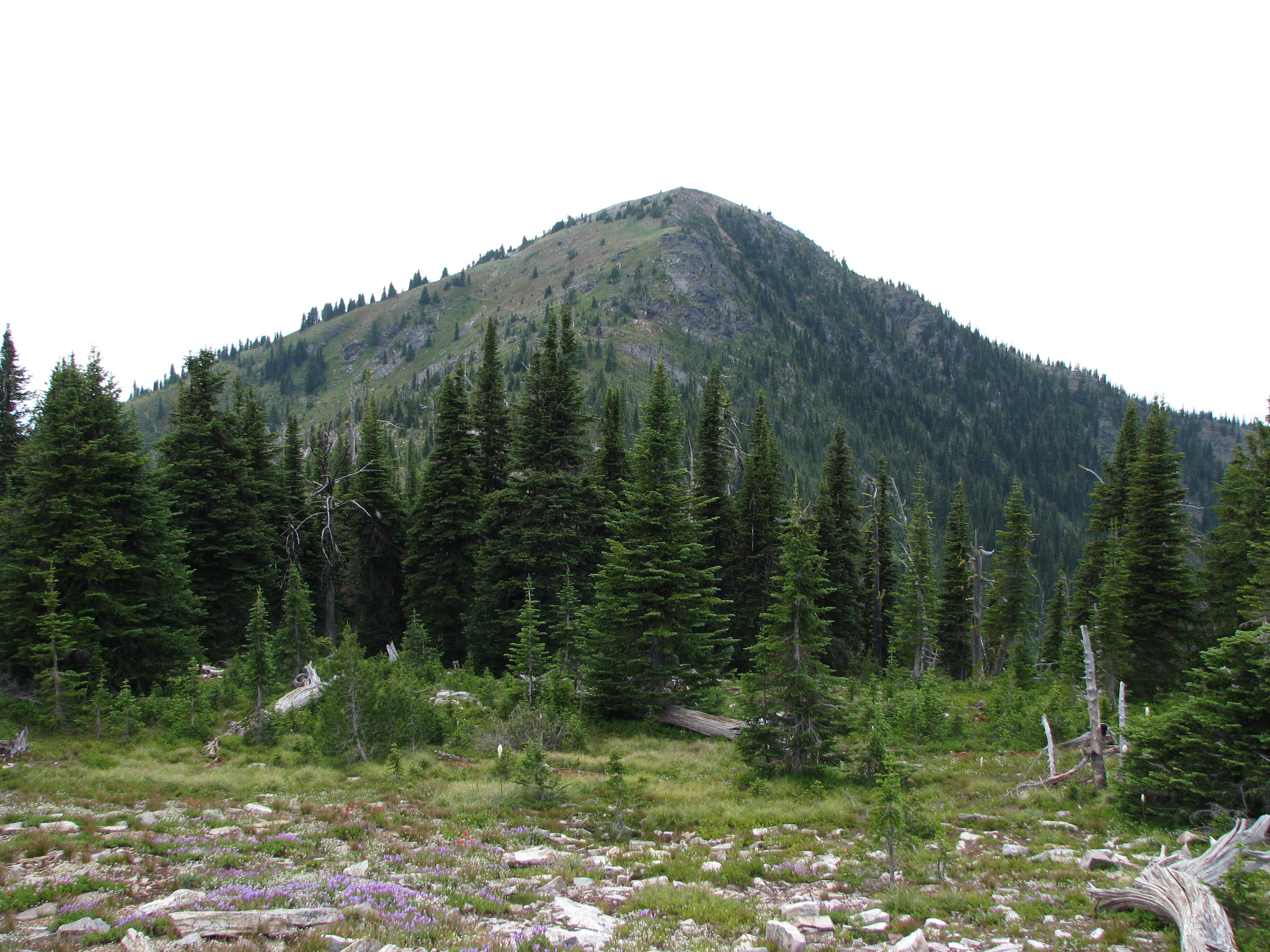
- Abercrombie Mountain as seen from the ridge to Hooknose Mountain

Highest point
- Elevation: 7,310 ft (2,228 m) NAVD 88
- Prominence: 5,168 ft (1,575 m)
- Listing: US most prominent peaks 116th
- Coordinates: 48°55′42″N 117°27′36″W

Geography
- Location within Washington (state)
- Interactive map of Abercrombie Mountain
- Location: Stevens County, Washington, U.S.
- Parent range: Selkirk Mountains
- Topo map: USGS Newport

Abercrombie Mountain is a tall peak in the Selkirk Mountains of northeast Washington located within the Colville National Forest. At 7,310 feet (2,228 m) in elevation, it is the highest point in Stevens County, and the second highest peak in eastern Washington. Gypsy Peak, within the Salmo-Priest Wilderness is at least 10 feet (3.0 m) taller. With a prominence of 5,168 feet (1,575 m), Abercrombie Mountain is one of the ultra prominent peaks in the United States, and is the 7th most prominent peak in the state of Washington.

Abercrombie Peak was named for Lieutenant William R. Abercrombie, who explored the nearby Pend Oreille River in 1879 and 1883.

== See also ==
- List of mountains of Washington (state)
