= Peak 5390 =

Highest peak of Baranof Island, Alaska, United States

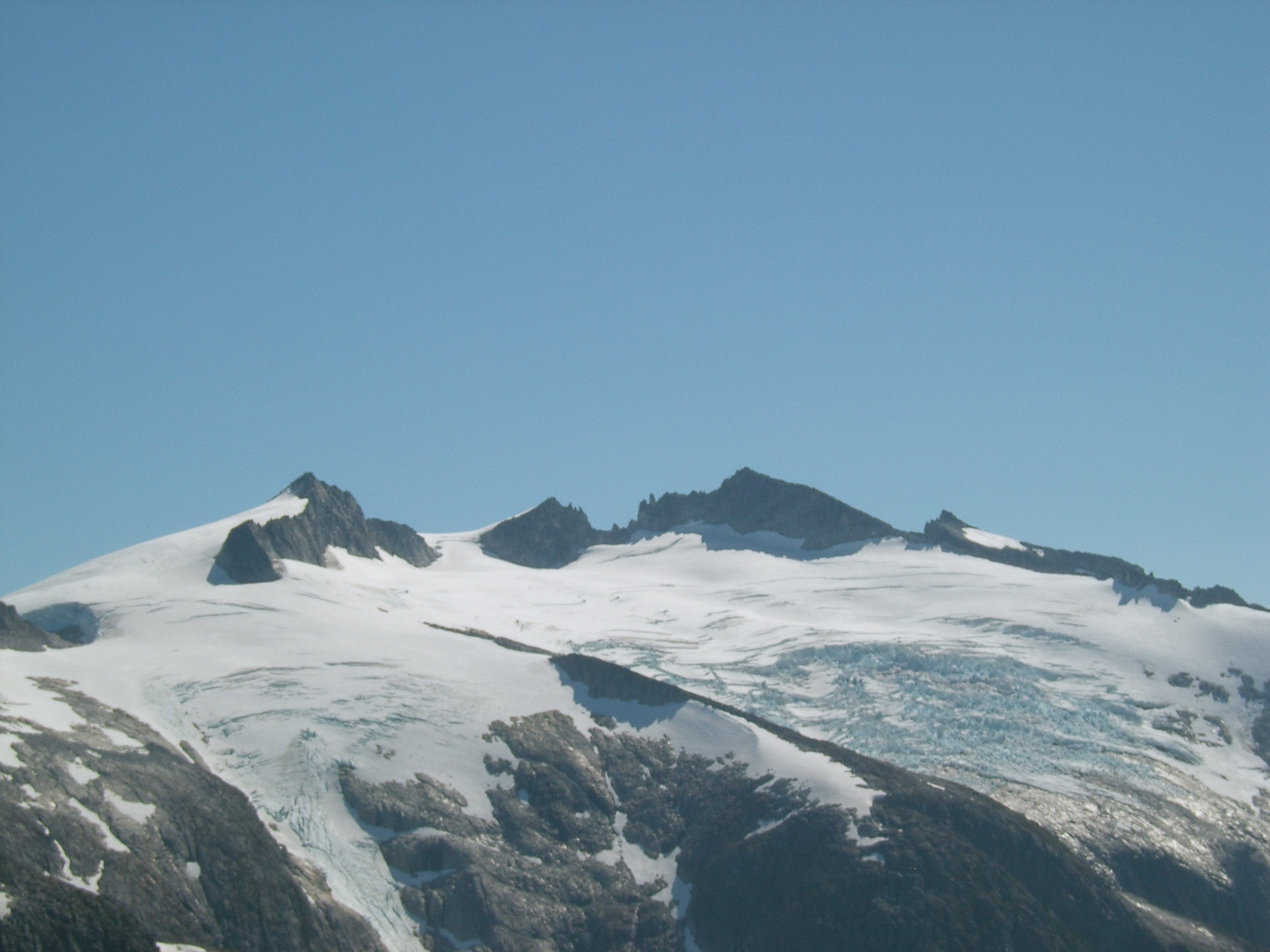
- Peak 5390 is farthest to the left

Highest point
- Elevation: 5,390 ft (1,640 m)
- Prominence: 5,390 ft (1,640 m)
- Coordinates: 57°00′54.50″N 134°59′17.55″W

Geography
- Location within Alaska
- Location: Sitka City and Borough, Alaska, U.S.
- Parent range: Alexander Archipelago
- Topo map: USGS Sitka

Climbing
- Easiest route: Scramble

Peak 5390, also known as Veniaminof Peak and Lacey Peak, is the highest peak on Baranof Island and the Alexander Archipelago which are located in southeast Alaska. The prominent is 5,390-foot (1,643 m) ranking it 97th on the list of prominent peaks in the United States. Peak 5390 is an unofficial name as it is unnamed by USGS maps. Peak 5390 ranks as the highest island-based peak in the U.S. outside of the Aleutian Islands in Alaska and volcanos on Hawaiʻi and Maui islands.

On a clear day, the mainland, the Coast Mountains, and distinguished peaks such as Devils Thumb and other spires in the Stikine Icecap are visible from the summit.
