= Chiricahua Peak =

Mountain in Cochise County, Arizona, US

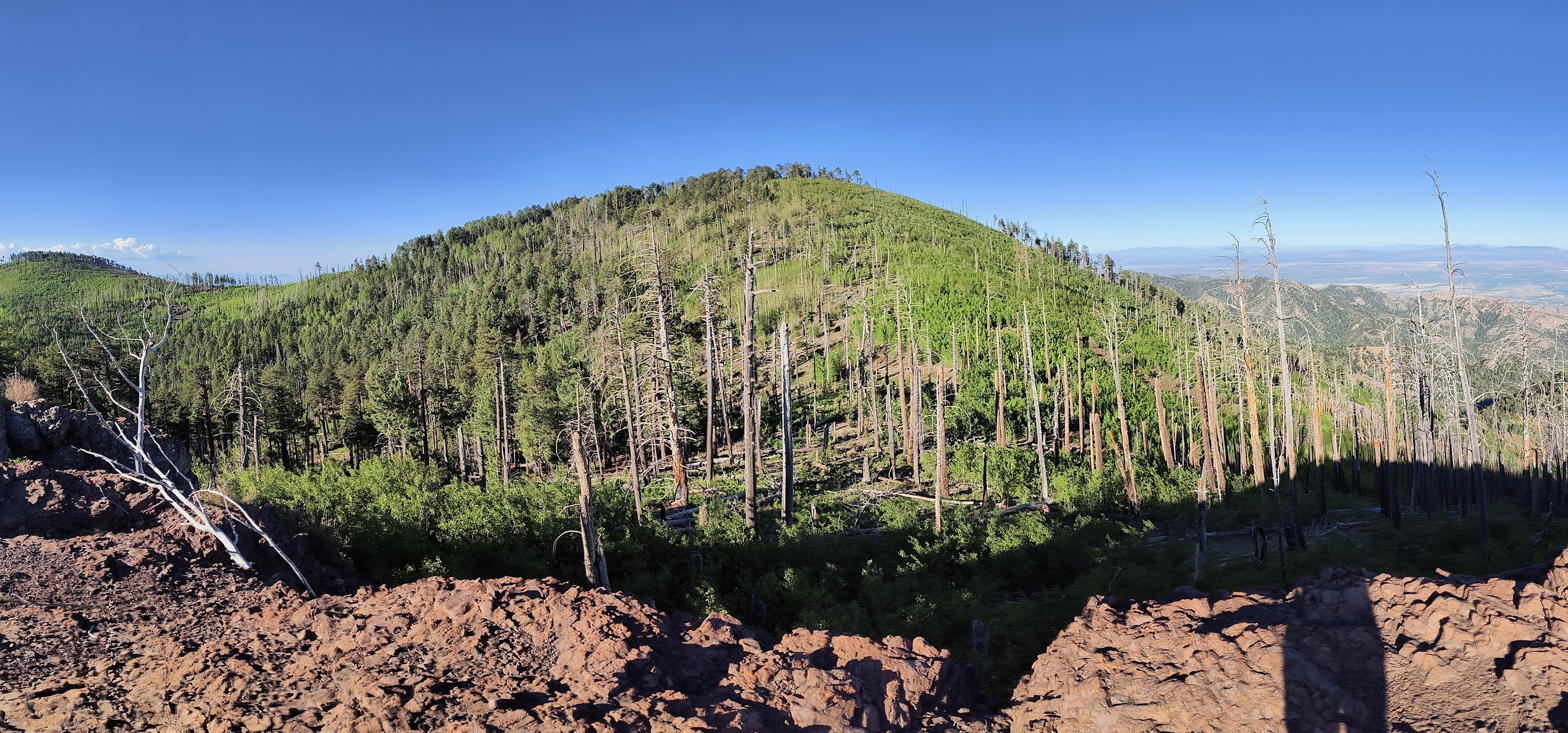
- Chiricahua Peak from above Junction Saddle.

Highest point
- Elevation: 9,773 ft (2,979 m) NAVD 88
- Prominence: 5,139 ft (1,566 m)
- Parent peak: Nevado de Toluca
- Isolation: 64.19 mi (103.30 km)
- Listing: U.S. most prominent peaks 119th; Arizona county high points
- Coordinates: 31°50′47″N 109°17′29″W

Geography
- Location within Arizona
- Location: Chiricahua National Monument; Cochise County, Arizona, U.S.
- Parent range: Chiricahua Mountains
- Topo map: USGS Chiricahua Peak

Geology
- Rock age: 27 Ma
- Mountain type: Volcanic

Chiricahua Peak is a 9,773-foot (2,979 m) peak located in the Chiricahua Mountains of southeastern Arizona, located about 35 miles (56 km) north of the United States–Mexico border. It is the highest summit in the Chiricahua Mountains and the highest point in Cochise County.

As with the rest of the Chiricahua Mountains, the peak was formed as the result of a violent volcanic eruption about 27 million years ago.

The peak contains one of the southernmost Engelmann spruce stands in the world. There are also extensive stands of quaking aspen on the north slope. Much of the peak was severely burned in recent times, causing aspens to take up once occupied by evergreen trees. Through the trunks of trees, views can be seen northward and westward. This includes views across the Basin and Range to Mount Lemmon, Mount Graham, and Mount Wrightson. In addition, Willcox Playa is visible in the basin below.

In 2011 the Horseshoe 2 Fire burned a total of 223,000 acres (90,000 ha) within the Chiricahua Mountains causing considerable damage to the trail system. Most trails still receive infrequent volunteer maintenance.

== See also ==
- Chiricahua National Monument
- List of Ultras of the United States
- Coronado National Forest
