= 8517 Peak =

Mountain in Alaska, United States

Peak 8517
- Bearhole Peak
- Location within Alaska

Highest point
- Elevation: 8,517 ft (2,596 m)
- Prominence: 5,317 ft (1,621 m)
- Isolation: 9.6 mi (15.4 km)
- Coordinates: 60°55′42″N 142°31′25″W

Geography
- Location: Wrangell-St. Elias National Park and Preserve of Alaska, United States
- Parent range: Saint Elias Mountains

Climbing
- Easiest route: hike

Peak 8517 is the unofficial name of a 8,517-foot (2,596 m) summit in the Saint Elias Mountains in Wrangell-St. Elias National Park and Preserve in Alaska, United States. The peak is also known as Bearhole Peak. The prominent is 5,317-foot (1,621 m) ranking it 100th on the list of prominent peaks in the United States.

== See also ==
- List of mountain peaks of Alaska
  - List of the most prominent summits of Alaska
