= List of the most prominent summits of the United States =

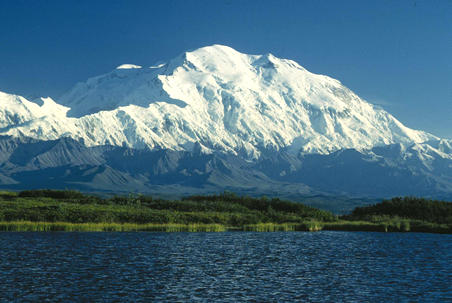
Denali (also known as Mount McKinley) in Alaska is the highest mountain peak of the United States and North America. Denali is the third most topographically prominent and third most topographically isolated summit on Earth after Mount Everest and Aconcagua.

The following sortable table comprises the 200 most topographically prominent mountain peaks of the United States of America.

The summit of a mountain or hill may be measured in three principal ways:

1. The topographic elevation of a summit measures the height of the summit above a geodetic sea level.
2. The topographic prominence of a summit is a measure of how high the summit rises above its surroundings.
3. The topographic isolation (or radius of dominance) of a summit measures how far the summit lies from its nearest point of equal elevation.

Denali is one of only three summits on Earth with more than 6,000 meters (20,000 feet) of topographic prominence. Three summits of the United States possess a prominence greater than 4,000 meters (13,000 feet), six exceed 3,500 meters (11,500 feet), ten exceed 3,000 meters (9,800 feet), 19 exceed 2,500 meters (8,200 feet), 45 exceed 2,000 meters (6,600 feet), 128 ultra-prominent summits exceed 1,500 meters (4,900 feet), and 264 major summits exceed 1,000 meters (3,300 feet) of topographic prominence.

== Most prominent summits ==
Of the 200 most prominent summits of the United States, 84 are located in Alaska, 17 in California, 17 in Nevada, 14 in Washington, 12 in Montana, 11 in Utah, nine in Arizona, seven in Hawaii, six in Colorado, six in Oregon, four in Wyoming, four in Idaho, four in New Mexico, two in North Carolina, and one each in New Hampshire, New York, Tennessee, Texas and Maine. Four of these peaks lie on the international border between Alaska and British Columbia, four lie on the international border between Alaska and Yukon, and one lies on the state border between Tennessee and North Carolina.

The 200 most topographically prominent summits of the United States
Rank	Mountain peak	State	Mountain Range	Elevation	Prominence	Isolation	Location
1	Denali (Note: The summit of Denali is the highest point of the Alaska Range, the State of Alaska, the United States of America, and greater North America. Denali is the third most topographically prominent and third most topographically isolated summit on Earth after Mount Everest and Aconcagua.) (Mount McKinley)	Alaska	Alaska Range	20,310 ft 6190.5 m	20,146 ft 6141 m	4,629 mi 7,450 km	63.0690°N 151.0063°W
2	Mauna Kea (Note: The summit of Mauna Kea is the highest point of the Island of Hawaiʻi, the U.S. State of Hawaii, and all islands of the Pacific Ocean.) (Note: Mauna Kea is the tallest mountain on Earth as measured from base to summit. The shield volcano sits on the ocean floor at a depth of 5998 meters (19,678 feet) for a total height of 10,205.3 meters (33,482 feet).)	Hawaii	Island of Hawaiʻi	13,803 ft 4207.3 m	13,803 ft 4207 m	2,453 mi 3,947 km	19.8207°N 155.4681°W
3	Mount Rainier (Note: The summit of Mount Rainier is the highest point of the Cascade Range and the U.S. State of Washington. Mount Rainier is the most prominent summit in the contiguous United States and the fourth most prominent in North America.) (Note: The elevation of Mount Rainier includes an adjustment of +1.914 m (6.28 ft) from NGVD 29 to NAVD 88.)	Washington	Cascade Range	14,417 ft 4394 m	13,210 ft 4026 m	731 mi 1,177 km	46.8529°N 121.7604°W
4	Mount Fairweather (Note: Mount Fairweather lies on the international border between Alaska and British Columbia. The peak is the highest point of the Canadian Province of British Columbia and the southernmost and easternmost summit of its elevation in both Canada and the United States.) (Fairweather Mountain)	Alaska; British Columbia	Saint Elias Mountains	15,325 ft 4671 m	12,995 ft 3961 m	124.4 mi 200 km	58.9064°N 137.5265°W
5	Mount Blackburn (Note: The summit of Mount Blackburn is the highest point of the Wrangell Mountains.)	Alaska	Wrangell Mountains	16,390 ft 4996 m	11,640 ft 3548 m	60.7 mi 97.6 km	61.7305°N 143.4031°W
6	Mount Hayes (Note: The summit of Mount Hayes is the highest point of the Hayes Range.) (Note: Mount Hayes is the northernmost 4000-meter (13,123-foot) summit of Alaska, the United States, and greater North America.)	Alaska	Alaska Range	13,832 ft 4216 m	11,507 ft 3507 m	125.5 mi 202 km	63.6203°N 146.7178°W
7	Mount Saint Elias (Note: Mount Saint Elias is the second highest major summit of both Canada and the United States.)	Alaska; Yukon	Saint Elias Mountains	18,009 ft 5489 m	11,250 ft 3429 m	25.6 mi 41.3 km	60.2927°N 140.9307°W
8	Mount Marcus Baker (Note: The summit of Mount Marcus Baker is the highest point of the Chugach Mountains.)	Alaska	Chugach Mountains	13,176 ft 4016 m	10,751 ft 3277 m	126.3 mi 203 km	61.4374°N 147.7525°W
9	Mount Whitney (Note: The summit of Mount Whitney is the highest point of the Sierra Nevada, the State of California, and the contiguous United States.) (Note: Mount Whitney is the southernmost and easternmost summit of its elevation in United States.)	California	Sierra Nevada	14,505 ft 4421 m	10,080 ft 3072 m	1,646 mi 2,649 km	36.5786°N 118.2920°W
10	Haleakalā (Note: The summit of Haleakalā is the highest point of the Island of Maui and the westernmost 3,000-meter (9,800-foot) summit of the United States.)	Hawaii	Island of Maui	10,023 ft 3055 m	10,023 ft 3055 m	76.3 mi 122.9 km	20.7097°N 156.2533°W
11	Mount Shasta (Note: The summit of Mount Shasta is the highest point of the southern Cascade Range.)	California	Cascade Range	14,179 ft 4321.8 m	9,772 ft 2979 m	335 mi 539 km	41.4092°N 122.1949°W
12	Shishaldin Volcano (Note: The summit of Shishaldin Volcano is the highest point of Unimak Island and the Aleutian Islands.) (Note: Shishaldin Volcano is the westernmost summit of its elevation in Alaska, the United States, and greater North America.)	Alaska	Unimak Island	9,414 ft 2869 m	9,414 ft 2869 m	545 mi 877 km	54.7554°N 163.9709°W
13	Redoubt Volcano (Note: The summit of Redoubt Volcano is the highest point of the Chigmit Mountains.) (Note: Redoubt Volcano is the westernmost summit of its elevation in Alaska and greater North America.)	Alaska	Chigmit Mountains	10,197 ft 3108 m	9,147 ft 2788 m	58.7 mi 94.5 km	60.4854°N 152.7442°W
14	Mount Elbert (Note: The summit of Mount Elbert is the highest point of the U.S. State of Colorado, the Rocky Mountains of North America, and the entire Mississippi River drainage basin.)	Colorado	Sawatch Range	14,440 ft 4401.2 m	9,093 ft 2772 m	671 mi 1,079 km	39.1178°N 106.4454°W
15	Mount Baker (Note: The summit of Mount Baker is the highest point of the northern Cascade Range.) (Note: The elevation of Mount Baker includes an adjustment of +1.43 m (4.69 ft) from NGVD 29 to NAVD 88.)	Washington	Skagit Range	10,787 ft 3288 m	8,845 ft 2696 m	131.5 mi 212 km	48.7768°N 121.8145°W
16	Mount Torbert (Note: The summit of Mount Torbert is the highest point of the Tordrillo Mountains.) (Note: Mount Torbert is the westernmost summit of its elevation in Alaska and greater North America.)	Alaska	Alaska Range	11,413 ft 3479 m	8,688 ft 2648 m	97.7 mi 157.3 km	61.4086°N 152.4125°W
17	San Jacinto Peak (Note: The summit of San Jacinto Peak is the highest point of the San Jacinto Mountains.)	California	San Jacinto Mountains	10,834 ft 3302.3 m	8,339 ft 2542 m	20.3 mi 32.7 km	33.8147°N 116.6794°W
18	San Gorgonio Mountain (Note: The summit of San Gorgonio Mountain is the highest point of the San Bernardino Mountains.) (Note: The elevation of San Gorgonio Mountain includes an adjustment of +1.303 m (4.27 ft) from NGVD 29 to NAVD 88.)	California	San Bernardino Mountains	11,503 ft 3506 m	8,294 ft 2528 m	162.5 mi 262 km	34.0992°N 116.8249°W
19	Charleston Peak (Note: The summit of Charleston Peak is the highest point of the Spring Mountains.) (Mount Charleston)	Nevada	Spring Mountains	11,916 ft 3632 m	8,258 ft 2517 m	135.1 mi 218 km	36.2716°N 115.6956°W
20	Mount Pavlof (Note: The summit of Mount Pavlof is the highest point of the Alaska Peninsula.)	Alaska	Alaska Peninsula	8,250 ft 2515 m	8,200 ft 2499 m	94.3 mi 151.8 km	55.4173°N 161.8932°W
20	Mount Veniaminof (Note: The summit of Mount Veniaminof is the highest point of the Alaska Peninsula.)	Alaska	Alaska Peninsula	8,225 ft 2507 m	8,200 ft 2499 m	209 mi 337 km	56.2194°N 159.2975°W
22	Mount Adams	Washington	Cascade Range	12,281 ft 3743.4 m	8,136 ft 2480 m	45.8 mi 73.6 km	46.2024°N 121.4909°W
23	Mount Hubbard	Alaska; Yukon	Saint Elias Mountains	14,951 ft 4557 m	8,061 ft 2457 m	21.3 mi 34.4 km	60.3194°N 139.0726°W
24	Mount Isto (Note: The summit of Mount Isto is the highest point of the Brooks Range.) (Note: Mount Isto is the northernmost ultra-prominent summit of Alaska and the United States.)	Alaska	Brooks Range	8,976 ft 2736 m	7,901 ft 2408 m	394 mi 634 km	69.2025°N 143.8020°W
25	Iliamna Volcano (Note: Iliamna Volcano is the westernmost 3000-meter (9843-foot) summit of Alaska and greater North America.)	Alaska	Chigmit Mountains	10,016 ft 3053 m	7,866 ft 2398 m	33.6 mi 54.1 km	60.0321°N 153.0915°W
26	Mount Olympus (Note: The summit of Mount Olympus is the highest point of the Olympic Mountains.)	Washington	Olympic Mountains	7,980 ft 2432.3 m	7,838 ft 2389 m	108 mi 173.7 km	47.8013°N 123.7108°W
27	Mount Cook	Alaska; Yukon	Saint Elias Mountains	13,760 ft 4194 m	7,710 ft 2350 m	14.54 mi 23.4 km	60.1816°N 139.9811°W
28	Mount Hood (Note: The summit of Mount Hood is the highest point of the Oregon Cascades and the U.S. State of Oregon.)	Oregon	Cascade Range	11,249 ft 3428.8 m	7,706 ft 2349 m	57.3 mi 92.2 km	45.3735°N 121.6959°W
29	Mount Sanford	Alaska	Wrangell Mountains	16,237 ft 4949 m	7,687 ft 2343 m	40.3 mi 64.8 km	62.2132°N 144.1292°W
30	Mount Tom White	Alaska	Chugach Mountains	11,191 ft 3411 m	7,641 ft 2329 m	73 mi 117.6 km	60.6518°N 143.6972°W
31	Wheeler Peak (Note: The summit of Wheeler Peak is the highest point of the Snake Range.)	Nevada	Snake Range	13,065 ft 3982.3 m	7,568 ft 2307 m	232 mi 373 km	38.9858°N 114.3139°W
32	Glacier Peak (Note: The elevation of Glacier Peak includes an adjustment of +1.492 m (4.9 ft) from NGVD 29 to NAVD 88.)	Washington	Cascade Range	10,545 ft 3214 m	7,518 ft 2291 m	56 mi 90.2 km	48.1125°N 121.1138°W
33	Mount Kimball (Note: The summit of Mount Kimball is the highest point of the Delta Range.)	Alaska	Alaska Range	10,350 ft 3155 m	7,425 ft 2263 m	55.8 mi 89.8 km	63.2390°N 144.6419°W
34	Mount Griggs	Alaska	Alaska Peninsula	7,650 ft 2332 m	7,300 ft 2225 m	135.4 mi 218 km	58.3534°N 155.0958°W
35	Mount Foraker (Note: Mount Foraker is the westernmost 5000-meter (16,404-foot) summit of Alaska, the United States, and greater North America.)	Alaska	Alaska Range	17,400 ft 5304 m	7,250 ft 2210 m	14.27 mi 23 km	62.9604°N 151.3998°W
36	White Mountain Peak (Note: The summit of White Mountain Peak is the highest point of the White Mountains.)	California	White Mountains	14,252 ft 4344 m	7,196 ft 2193 m	67.4 mi 108.6 km	37.6341°N 118.2557°W
37	Mount Crillon	Alaska	Saint Elias Mountains	12,726 ft 3879 m	7,176 ft 2187 m	19.52 mi 31.4 km	58.6625°N 137.1712°W
38	Mauna Loa (Note: Mauna Loa is the southernmost and westernmost 4000-meter (13,123-foot) summit of Hawaii and the United States.) (Note: The shield volcano Mauna Loa is the most voluminous mountain on Earth with an estimated volume of 74,000 km^{3} (18,000 mi^{3}), or enough material to fill the Grand Canyon more than 18 times.)	Hawaii	Island of Hawaiʻi	13,679 ft 4169 m	7,099 ft 2164 m	25.4 mi 40.8 km	19.4756°N 155.6054°W
39	Cloud Peak (Note: The summit of Cloud Peak is the highest point of the Bighorn Mountains.) (Note: Cloud Peak is the northernmost 4000-meter (13,123-foot) summit of the Rocky Mountains.)	Wyoming	Bighorn Mountains	13,167 ft 4013.3 m	7,077 ft 2157 m	145 mi 233 km	44.3821°N 107.1739°W
40	Gannett Peak (Note: The summit of Gannett Peak is the highest point of the Wind River Range, the U.S. State of Wyoming, and the central Rocky Mountains.) (Note: Gannett Peak is the northernmost and westernmost summit of its elevation in the Rocky Mountains.)	Wyoming	Wind River Range	13,809 ft 4209.1 m	7,076 ft 2157 m	290 mi 467 km	43.1842°N 109.6542°W
41	Mount Vsevidof (Note: The summit of Mount Vsevidof is the highest point of Umnak Island and the Fox Islands.) (Note: Mount Vsevidof is the westernmost 2000-meter (6562-foot) summit of Alaska, the United States, and greater North America.)	Alaska	Umnak Island	7,051 ft 2149 m	7,051 ft 2149 m	223 mi 358 km	53.1256°N 168.6938°W
42	Mount Hesperus (Note: The summit of Mount Hesperus is the highest point of the western Alaska Range.) (Note: Mount Hesperus is the westernmost summit of its elevation in Alaska and greater North America.)	Alaska	Alaska Range	9,828 ft 2996 m	6,978 ft 2127 m	58.1 mi 93.5 km	61.8036°N 154.1469°W
43	Mount Bona (Note: The summit of Mount Bona is the highest point of the northwest Saint Elias Mountains.)	Alaska	Saint Elias Mountains	16,550 ft 5044 m	6,900 ft 2103 m	49.7 mi 80 km	61.3856°N 141.7495°W
44	Mount Drum	Alaska	Wrangell Mountains	12,010 ft 3661 m	6,760 ft 2060 m	17.73 mi 28.5 km	62.1159°N 144.6394°W
45	Mount Chiginagak	Alaska	Aleutian Range	6,925 ft 2111 m	6,675 ft 2035 m	97.6 mi 157 km	57.1334°N 156.9912°W
46	Grand Teton (Note: The summit of Grand Teton is the highest point of the Teton Range.) (Note: Grand Teton is the northernmost and westernmost 4000-meter (13,123-foot) summit of the Rocky Mountains.)	Wyoming	Teton Range	13,775 ft 4198.7 m	6,545 ft 1995 m	69.4 mi 111.6 km	43.7412°N 110.8024°W
47	Sacajawea Peak (Oregon) (Note: The summit of Sacajawea Peak (Oregon) is the highest point of the Wallowa Mountains and the Columbia Plateau.) (Note: The elevation of Sacajawea Peak (Oregon) includes an adjustment of +1.56 m (5.12 ft) from NGVD 29 to NAVD 88.)	Oregon	Wallowa Mountains	9,843 ft 3000 m	6,393 ft 1949 m	125.5 mi 202 km	45.2450°N 117.2929°W
48	Mount Neacola (Note: The summit of Mount Neacola is the highest point of the Neacola Mountains.)	Alaska	Aleutian Range	9,426 ft 2873 m	6,376 ft 1943 m	31 mi 49.9 km	60.7981°N 153.3959°W
49	Kings Peak (Note: The summit of Kings Peak is the highest point of the Uinta Mountains, the U.S. State of Utah, and the western Rocky Mountains.) (Note: The elevation of Kings Peak includes an adjustment of +1.807 m (5.93 ft) from NGVD 29 to NAVD 88.)	Utah	Uinta Mountains	13,534 ft 4125 m	6,358 ft 1938 m	166.6 mi 268 km	40.7763°N 110.3729°W
50	Mount Graham (Note: The summit of Mount Graham is the highest point of the Pinaleño Mountains.)	Arizona	Pinaleño Mountains	10,724 ft 3268.6 m	6,340 ft 1932 m	82.4 mi 132.6 km	32.7017°N 109.8714°W
51	Mount Douglas	Alaska	Alaska Peninsula	7,050 ft 2149 m	6,300 ft 1920 m	42.9 mi 69 km	58.8598°N 153.5353°W
52	Mount San Antonio (Note: The summit of Mount San Antonio is the highest point of the San Gabriel Mountains.) (Note: The elevation of Mount San Antonio includes an adjustment of +1.214 m (3.98 ft) from NGVD 29 to NAVD 88.)	California	San Gabriel Mountains	10,068 ft 3069 m	6,244 ft 1903 m	42.5 mi 68.4 km	34.2891°N 117.6463°W
53	Kichatna Spire	Alaska	Alaska Range	8,985 ft 2739 m	6,235 ft 1900 m	37.3 mi 60 km	62.4231°N 152.7231°W
54	Mount Chosin Few (Peak 8084)	Alaska	Chugach Mountains	8,084 ft 2464 m	6,234 ft 1900 m	43.1 mi 69.3 km	60.8299°N 145.1335°W
55	Telescope Peak (Note: The summit of Telescope Peak is the highest point of the Panamint Range.)	California	Panamint Range	11,043 ft 3366 m	6,188 ft 1886 m	57.2 mi 92 km	36.1698°N 117.0892°W
56	Mount Peale (Note: The summit of Mount Peale is the highest point of the La Sal Mountains and the Colorado Plateau.)	Utah	La Sal Mountains	12,726 ft 3879 m	6,181 ft 1884 m	72.8 mi 117.1 km	38.4385°N 109.2292°W
56	Pogromni Volcano	Alaska	Unimak Island	6,531 ft 1991 m	6,181 ft 1884 m	31.7 mi 50.9 km	54.5705°N 164.6926°W
58	Peak 8010 (Alaska)	Alaska	Chugach Mountains	8,010 ft 2441 m	6,160 ft 1878 m	25.3 mi 40.7 km	61.1605°N 144.8129°W
59	Mount Washington (Note: The summit of Mount Washington is the highest point of the White Mountains, the State of New Hampshire, and the northeastern United States.) (Note: Mount Washington is the easternmost ultra-prominent summit of the United States.) (Note: The elevation of Mount Washington includes an adjustment of +0.02 m (0.07 ft) from NGVD 29 to NAVD 88.)	New Hampshire	White Mountains	6,288 ft 1917 m	6,158 ft 1877 m	820 mi 1,319 km	44.2705°N 71.3032°W
60	Mount Igikpak (Note: The summit of Mount Igikpak is the highest point of the Schwatka Mountains.)	Alaska	Brooks Range	8,276 ft 2523 m	6,126 ft 1867 m	282 mi 453 km	67.4129°N 154.9656°W
61	Snow Tower	Alaska	Coast Mountains	6,572 ft 2003 m	6,122 ft 1866 m	10.12 mi 16.28 km	58.1724°N 133.4009°W
62	Mount Mitchell (Note: The summit of Mount Mitchell is the highest point of the Appalachian Mountains, the State of North Carolina, and the eastern United States.) (Note: Mount Mitchell is the easternmost 2000-meter (6562-foot) summit of the United States.) (Note: The elevation of Mount Mitchell includes an adjustment of +0.025 m (0.08 ft) from NGVD 29 to NAVD 88.)	North Carolina	Blue Ridge Mountains	6,684 ft 2037 m	6,092 ft 1857 m	1,189 mi 1,913 km	35.7649°N 82.2651°W
63	Truuli Peak (Note: The summit of Truuli Peak is the highest point of the Kenai Mountains.)	Alaska	Kenai Mountains	6,612 ft 2015 m	6,062 ft 1848 m	87.8 mi 141.3 km	59.9129°N 150.4348°W
64	Humphreys Peak (Note: The summit of Humphreys Peak is the highest point of the San Francisco Peaks and the U.S. State of Arizona.) (Note: The elevation of Humphreys Peak includes an adjustment of +1.345 m (4.41 ft) from NGVD 29 to NAVD 88.)	Arizona	San Francisco Peaks	12,637 ft 3852 m	6,039 ft 1841 m	246 mi 396 km	35.3464°N 111.6780°W
65	Borah Peak (Note: The summit of Borah Peak is the highest point of the Lost River Range and the U.S. State of Idaho.)	Idaho	Lost River Range	12,668 ft 3861.2 m	6,002 ft 1829 m	150.8 mi 243 km	44.1374°N 113.7811°W
66	Mount Natazhat	Alaska	Saint Elias Mountains	13,435 ft 4095 m	5,985 ft 1824 m	15.49 mi 24.9 km	61.5217°N 141.1030°W
67	Hanagita Peak	Alaska	Chugach Mountains	8,504 ft 2592 m	5,954 ft 1815 m	22 mi 35.3 km	61.0670°N 143.7075°W
68	Tanaga Volcano (Note: The summit of Tanaga Volcano is the highest point of Tanaga Island and the Andreanof Islands.) (Note: Tanaga Volcano is the westernmost summit of its elevation in Alaska, the United States, and greater North America.)	Alaska	Tanaga Island	5,925 ft 1806 m	5,925 ft 1806 m	407 mi 656 km	51.8838°N 178.1429°W
69	Makushin Volcano (Note: The summit of Makushin Volcano is the highest point of Unalaska Island.)	Alaska	Unalaska Island	5,905 ft 1800 m	5,905 ft 1800 m	83.1 mi 133.8 km	53.8782°N 166.9299°W
70	Sovereign Mountain (Note: The summit of Sovereign Mountain is the highest point of the Talkeetna Mountains.)	Alaska	Talkeetna Mountains	8,849 ft 2697 m	5,874 ft 1790 m	45.6 mi 73.5 km	62.1311°N 148.6044°W
71	Mount Jefferson (Note: The summit of Mount Jefferson is the highest point of the Toquima Range.) (Note: The elevation of Mount Jefferson includes an adjustment of +1.666 m (5.47 ft) from NGVD 29 to NAVD 88.)	Nevada	Toquima Range	11,946 ft 3641 m	5,871 ft 1789 m	98.6 mi 158.7 km	38.7519°N 116.9267°W
72	Mount Ellen (Note: The summit of Mount Ellen is the highest point of the Henry Mountains.) (Note: The elevation of Mount Ellen includes an adjustment of +1.486 m (4.88 ft) from NGVD 29 to NAVD 88.)	Utah	Henry Mountains	11,527 ft 3513 m	5,862 ft 1787 m	56 mi 90.2 km	38.1089°N 110.8136°W
73	Isanotski Peaks	Alaska	Unimak Island	8,106 ft 2471 m	5,856 ft 1785 m	9.71 mi 15.62 km	54.7680°N 163.7291°W
74	Deseret Peak (Note: The summit of Deseret Peak is the highest point of the Stansbury Mountains.)	Utah	Stansbury Mountains	11,035 ft 3364 m	5,812 ft 1772 m	46 mi 74 km	40.4595°N 112.6264°W
75	Mount Jefferson (Note: The elevation of Mount Jefferson includes an adjustment of +1.388 m (4.55 ft) from NGVD 29 to NAVD 88.)	Oregon	Cascade Range	10,502 ft 3201 m	5,797 ft 1767 m	48.1 mi 77.5 km	44.6743°N 121.7996°W
76	Isthmus Peak	Alaska	Kenai Mountains	6,532 ft 1991 m	5,782 ft 1762 m	32.3 mi 52 km	60.5772°N 148.8915°W
77	Frosty Peak	Alaska	Aleutian Range	5,803 ft 1769 m	5,753 ft 1754 m	35.4 mi 56.9 km	55.0672°N 162.8351°W
78	Pilot Peak (Note: The summit of Pilot Peak is the highest point of the Pilot Range.)	Nevada	Pilot Range	10,720 ft 3267.6 m	5,731 ft 1747 m	53.7 mi 86.4 km	41.0211°N 114.0774°W
79	Crazy Peak (Note: The summit of Crazy Peak is the highest point of the Crazy Mountains.) (Note: The elevation of Crazy Peak includes an adjustment of +1.421 m (4.66 ft) from NGVD 29 to NAVD 88.)	Montana	Crazy Mountains	11,214 ft 3418 m	5,719 ft 1743 m	44.6 mi 71.8 km	46.0181°N 110.2768°W
80	Great Sitkin Volcano (Note: The summit of Great Sitkin Volcano is the highest point of Great Sitkin Island.)	Alaska	Great Sitkin Island	5,710 ft 1740 m	5,710 ft 1740 m	87.8 mi 141.3 km	52.0763°N 176.1108°W
81	Puʻu Kukui	Hawaii	Island of Maui	5,788 ft 1764 m	5,678 ft 1731 m	23.5 mi 37.9 km	20.8904°N 156.5863°W
82	Mount Cleveland (Note: The summit of Mount Cleveland is the highest point of Chuginadak Island.)	Alaska	Chuginadak Island	5,675 ft 1730 m	5,675 ft 1730 m	56.3 mi 90.6 km	52.8230°N 169.9465°W
83	McDonald Peak (Note: The summit of McDonald Peak is the highest point of the Mission Range.) (Note: The elevation of McDonald Peak includes an adjustment of +1.318 m (4.32 ft) from NGVD 29 to NAVD 88.)	Montana	Mission Range	9,824 ft 2994 m	5,650 ft 1722 m	79.4 mi 127.8 km	47.3826°N 113.9191°W
84	Mount Wrangell	Alaska	Wrangell Mountains	14,163 ft 4317 m	5,613 ft 1711 m	14.79 mi 23.8 km	62.0059°N 144.0187°W
85	South Sister	Oregon	Cascade Range	10,363 ft 3158.5 m	5,593 ft 1705 m	39.4 mi 63.4 km	44.1035°N 121.7693°W
86	Devils Paw (Note: The summit of Devils Paw is the highest point of the Juneau Icefield.)	Alaska; British Columbia	Coast Mountains	8,507 ft 2593 m	5,587 ft 1703 m	84.7 mi 136.3 km	58.7289°N 133.8402°W
87	Mount Seattle	Alaska	Saint Elias Mountains	10,350 ft 3155 m	5,561 ft 1695 m	11.97 mi 19.26 km	60.0680°N 139.1893°W
88	Sierra Blanca Peak (Note: The summit of Sierra Blanca Peak is the highest point of the Sacramento Mountains.)	New Mexico	Sacramento Mountains	11,981 ft 3651.8 m	5,553 ft 1693 m	165.7 mi 267 km	33.3743°N 105.8087°W
89	Pikes Peak (Note: Pikes Peak is the easternmost 14,000-foot (4267-meter) summit and ultra-prominent summit of the Rocky Mountains. Pikes Peak was the inspiration for the lyrics of America the Beautiful.)	Colorado	Front Range	14,115 ft 4302.31 m	5,530 ft 1686 m	60.6 mi 97.6 km	38.8405°N 105.0442°W
90	Mount Russell (Note: Mount Russell is the westernmost summit of its elevation in Alaska and greater North America.)	Alaska	Alaska Range	11,670 ft 3557 m	5,520 ft 1682 m	14.07 mi 22.7 km	62.7984°N 151.8845°W
91	Mount Nebo (Note: The summit of Mount Nebo is the highest point of the Wasatch Range.) (Note: The elevation of Mount Nebo includes an adjustment of +1.395 m (4.58 ft) from NGVD 29 to NAVD 88.)	Utah	Wasatch Range	11,933 ft 3637 m	5,508 ft 1679 m	75.6 mi 121.6 km	39.8219°N 111.7603°W
92	Snowshoe Peak (Note: The summit of Snowshoe Peak is the highest point of the Cabinet Mountains.) (Note: The elevation of Snowshoe Peak includes an adjustment of +1.367 m (4.48 ft) from NGVD 29 to NAVD 88.)	Montana	Cabinet Mountains	8,743 ft 2665 m	5,438 ft 1658 m	82.9 mi 133.5 km	48.2231°N 115.6890°W
93	North Schell Peak (Note: The summit of North Schell Peak is the highest point of the Schell Creek Range.)	Nevada	Schell Creek Range	11,895 ft 3625.6 m	5,413 ft 1650 m	23.5 mi 37.9 km	39.4132°N 114.5997°W
94	Hayford Peak (Note: The summit of Hayford Peak is the highest point of the Sheep Range.)	Nevada	Sheep Range	9,924 ft 3024.9 m	5,412 ft 1650 m	33.8 mi 54.3 km	36.6577°N 115.2008°W
95	Mount Foresta	Alaska	Saint Elias Mountains	11,050 ft 3368 m	5,400 ft 1646 m	12.51 mi 20.1 km	60.1912°N 139.4323°W
95	Star Peak (Note: The summit of Star Peak is the highest point of the Humboldt Range.)	Nevada	Humboldt Range	9,840 ft 2999.1 m	5,400 ft 1646 m	69 mi 111.1 km	40.5224°N 118.1708°W
97	Peak 5390 (Note: The summit of Peak 5390 is the highest point of Baranof Island.) (Veniaminof Peak)	Alaska	Baranof Island	5,390 ft 1643 m	5,390 ft 1643 m	79.7 mi 128.3 km	57.0151°N 134.9882°W
98	Diamond Peak (Note: The summit of Diamond Peak is the highest point of the Lemhi Range.)	Idaho	Lemhi Range	12,202 ft 3719.3 m	5,387 ft 1642 m	31.8 mi 51.2 km	44.1414°N 113.0827°W
99	Flat Top Mountain (Note: The summit of Flat Top Mountain is the highest point of the Oquirrh Mountains.) (Note: The elevation of Flat Top Mountain includes an adjustment of +1.329 m (4.36 ft) from NGVD 29 to NAVD 88.)	Utah	Oquirrh Mountains	10,624 ft 3238 m	5,383 ft 1641 m	23.8 mi 38.4 km	40.3724°N 112.1888°W
100	8517 Peak (Note: The summit of 8517 Peak is the highest point of the Granite Range.) (Bearhole Peak)	Alaska	Saint Elias Mountains	8,517 ft 2596 m	5,367 ft 1636 m	9.71 mi 15.62 km	60.9283°N 142.5237°W
101	Mount Steller (Note: The summit of Mount Steller is the highest point of Waxell Ridge.)	Alaska	Chugach Mountains	10,515 ft 3205 m	5,365 ft 1635 m	22.5 mi 36.2 km	60.5199°N 143.0932°W
102	Mount Stuart (Note: The summit of Mount Stuart is the highest point of the Wenatchee Mountains.) (Note: The elevation of Mount Stuart includes an adjustment of +1.388 m (4.55 ft) from NGVD 29 to NAVD 88.)	Washington	Wenatchee Mountains	9,420 ft 2871 m	5,354 ft 1632 m	44.5 mi 71.6 km	47.4751°N 120.9024°W
103	Blanca Peak (Note: The summit of Blanca Peak is the highest point of the Sangre de Cristo Mountains and the entire Rio Grande drainage basin.) (Note: Blanca Peak is the southernmost ultra-prominent summit of the Rocky Mountains.) (Note: The elevation of Blanca Peak includes an adjustment of +1.755 m (5.76 ft) from NGVD 29 to NAVD 88.)	Colorado	Sangre de Cristo Mountains	14,351 ft 4374 m	5,326 ft 1623 m	103.4 mi 166.4 km	37.5775°N 105.4856°W
104	Mount Miller (Note: The summit of Mount Miller is the highest point of Barkley Ridge.)	Alaska	Chugach Mountains	10,750 ft 3277 m	5,300 ft 1615 m	40.3 mi 64.9 km	60.4605°N 142.3012°W
105	Mount Carlisle (Note: The summit of Mount Carlisle is the highest point of Carlisle Island.)	Alaska	Carlisle Island	5,283 ft 1610 m	5,283 ft 1610 m	6.64 mi 10.68 km	52.8913°N 170.0580°W
106	Mount Timpanogos (Note: The summit of Mount Timpanogos is the highest point of the central Wasatch Range.)	Utah	Wasatch Range	11,752 ft 3582 m	5,279 ft 1609 m	39.6 mi 63.8 km	40.3908°N 111.6459°W
107	Bashful Peak (Note: The summit of Bashful Peak is the highest point of the western Chugach Mountains.)	Alaska	Chugach Mountains	8,005 ft 2440 m	5,275 ft 1608 m	22.1 mi 35.5 km	61.3076°N 148.8697°W
108	Ibapah Peak (Note: The summit of Ibapah Peak is the highest point of the Deep Creek Range.) (Note: The elevation of Ibapah Peak includes an adjustment of +1.517 m (4.98 ft) from NGVD 29 to NAVD 88.)	Utah	Deep Creek Range	12,092 ft 3686 m	5,267 ft 1605 m	61.2 mi 98.5 km	39.8282°N 113.9200°W
109	Mount Cleveland (Note: The summit of Mount Cleveland is the highest point of the Lewis Range.)	Montana	Lewis Range	10,479 ft 3194 m	5,246 ft 1599 m	99.4 mi 159.9 km	48.9249°N 113.8482°W
110	Kawaikini (Note: The summit of Kawaikini is the highest point of the Island of Kauaʻi.)	Hawaii	Island of Kauaʻi	5,243 ft 1598 m	5,243 ft 1598 m	204 mi 328 km	22.0586°N 159.4973°W
111	She Devil (Note: The summit of She Devil is the highest point of the Seven Devils Mountains.) (Note: The elevation of She Devil includes an adjustment of +1.365 m (4.48 ft) from NGVD 29 to NAVD 88.)	Idaho	Seven Devils Mountains	9,424 ft 2873 m	5,240 ft 1597 m	31.5 mi 50.6 km	45.3240°N 116.5406°W
111	Tetlin Peak	Alaska	Alaska Range	8,365 ft 2550 m	5,240 ft 1597 m	25.5 mi 41.1 km	62.6215°N 143.1084°W
113	Arc Dome (Note: The summit of Arc Dome is the highest point of the Toiyabe Range.) (Note: The elevation of Arc Dome includes an adjustment of +1.665 m (5.46 ft) from NGVD 29 to NAVD 88.)	Nevada	Toiyabe Range	11,778 ft 3590 m	5,233 ft 1595 m	23.1 mi 37.2 km	38.8327°N 117.3531°W
114	Lassen Peak	California	Cascade Range	10,462 ft 3188.7 m	5,229 ft 1594 m	71.4 mi 114.9 km	40.4882°N 121.5050°W
115	Mount Deborah (Note: Mount Deborah is the northernmost summit of its elevation in Alaska, the United States, and greater North America.)	Alaska	Alaska Range	12,339 ft 3761 m	5,189 ft 1582 m	16.08 mi 25.9 km	63.6377°N 147.2384°W
116	Necons Peak (Peak 8336)	Alaska	Alaska Range	8,336 ft 2541 m	5,186 ft 1581 m	21.9 mi 35.3 km	61.1125°N 153.4690°W
117	Abercrombie Mountain (Note: The elevation of Abercrombie Mountain includes an adjustment of +1.345 m (4.41 ft) from NGVD 29 to NAVD 88.)	Washington	Columbia Mountains	7,312 ft 2229 m	5,178 ft 1578 m	14.04 mi 22.6 km	48.9284°N 117.4600°W
118	Mount Lemmon (Note: The summit of Mount Lemmon is the highest point of the Santa Catalina Mountains.) (Note: The elevation of Mount Lemmon includes an adjustment of +1.004 m (3.29 ft) from NGVD 29 to NAVD 88.)	Arizona	Santa Catalina Mountains	9,160 ft 2792 m	5,177 ft 1578 m	51.5 mi 82.9 km	32.4430°N 110.7885°W
119	Gareloi Volcano (Note: The summit of Gareloi Volcano is the highest point of Gareloi Island.) (Note: Gareloi Volcano is the westernmost ultra-prominent summit of Alaska, the United States, and greater North America.)	Alaska	Gareloi Island	5,160 ft 1573 m	5,160 ft 1573 m	28.6 mi 46.1 km	51.7880°N 178.7940°W
120	Chiricahua Peak (Note: The summit of Chiricahua Peak is the highest point of the Chiricahua Mountains.) (Note: The elevation of Chiricahua Peak includes an adjustment of +1.173 m (3.85 ft) from NGVD 29 to NAVD 88.)	Arizona	Chiricahua Mountains	9,763 ft 2976 m	5,149 ft 1569 m	64.2 mi 103.3 km	31.8456°N 109.2910°W
121	Stony Peak (Peak 8488)	Alaska	Alaska Range	8,488 ft 2587 m	5,138 ft 1566 m	11.92 mi 19.19 km	61.4950°N 153.6224°W
122	Mount Eddy (Note: The summit of Mount Eddy is the highest point of the Klamath Mountains.)	California	Klamath Mountains	9,037 ft 2754.6 m	5,125 ft 1562 m	14.58 mi 23.5 km	41.3196°N 122.4790°W
123	Mount Augusta	Alaska; Yukon	Saint Elias Mountains	14,070 ft 4289 m	5,082 ft 1549 m	14.41 mi 23.2 km	60.3074°N 140.4584°W
124	Copper Peak (Peak 6915)	Alaska	Chugach Mountains	6,915 ft 2108 m	5,065 ft 1544 m	11.1 mi 17.87 km	61.3297°N 144.9599°W
125	Mount Bear	Alaska	Saint Elias Mountains	14,831 ft 4520 m	5,054 ft 1540 m	20.1 mi 32.4 km	61.2834°N 141.1433°W
126	Korovin Volcano (Note: The summit of Korovin Volcano is the highest point of Atka Island.)	Alaska	Atka Island	5,030 ft 1533 m	5,030 ft 1533 m	85.2 mi 137.2 km	52.3816°N 174.1653°W
127	Miller Peak (Note: The summit of Miller Peak is the highest point of the Huachuca Mountains.) (Note: The elevation of Miller Peak includes an adjustment of +1.067 m (3.5 ft) from NGVD 29 to NAVD 88.)	Arizona	Huachuca Mountains	9,470 ft 2886 m	5,011 ft 1527 m	66.5 mi 107 km	31.3928°N 110.2930°W
128	Kamakou (Note: The summit of Kamakou is the highest point of the Island of Molokaʻi.)	Hawaii	Island of Molokaʻi	4,961 ft 1512 m	4,961 ft 1512 m	23.5 mi 37.8 km	21.1065°N 156.8682°W
129	Mount Marcy (Note: The summit of Mount Marcy is the highest point of the Adirondack Mountains, the U.S. State of New York, and the drainage basins of the Gulf of Saint Lawrence and the Hudson River.)	New York	Adirondack Mountains	5,343 ft 1628.57 m	4,919 ft 1499 m	129.6 mi 209 km	44.1127°N 73.9237°W
130	Mount Moriah	Nevada	Snake Range	12,072 ft 3679.6 m	4,909 ft 1496 m	20.3 mi 32.7 km	39.2732°N 114.1988°W
131	Quinn Peak (Note: The summit of Quinn Peak is the highest point of the Jackson Mountains.) (Note: The elevation of Quinn Peak includes an adjustment of +1.275 m (4.18 ft) from NGVD 29 to NAVD 88.)	Nevada	Jackson Mountains	9,099 ft 2773 m	4,879 ft 1487 m	29.2 mi 46.9 km	41.3033°N 118.4163°W
132	Mount Linn (Note: The summit of Mount Linn is the highest point of the Northern California Coast Range.) (Note: The elevation of Mount Linn includes an adjustment of +1.148 m (3.77 ft) from NGVD 29 to NAVD 88.)	California	Northern California Coast Range	8,098 ft 2468 m	4,854 ft 1480 m	61.5 mi 98.9 km	40.0365°N 122.8542°W
133	Mount Tobin (Note: The summit of Mount Tobin is the highest point of the Tobin Range.)	Nevada	Tobin Range	9,778 ft 2980.4 m	4,851 ft 1479 m	35.4 mi 57 km	40.3765°N 117.5261°W
134	Kootznoowoo Peak (Note: The summit of Kootznoowoo Peak is the highest point of Admiralty Island.)	Alaska	Admiralty Island	4,850 ft 1478.3 m	4,850 ft 1478 m	35.7 mi 57.5 km	57.7891°N 134.4546°W
135	Hole in the Mountain Peak (Note: The summit of Hole in the Mountain Peak is the highest point of the eastern Humboldt Range.) (Note: The elevation of Hole in the Mountain Peak includes an adjustment of +1.457 m (4.78 ft) from NGVD 29 to NAVD 88.)	Nevada	East Humboldt Range	11,311 ft 3448 m	4,849 ft 1478 m	26.6 mi 42.8 km	40.9508°N 115.1224°W
136	Culebra Peak (Note: The summit of Culebra Peak is the highest point of the Culebra Range.) (Note: Culebra Peak is the southernmost 14,000-foot (4267-meter) summit of the Rocky Mountains.) (Note: The elevation of Culebra Peak includes an adjustment of +1.74 m (5.71 ft) from NGVD 29 to NAVD 88.)	Colorado	Culebra Range	14,053 ft 4283 m	4,827 ft 1471 m	35.4 mi 56.9 km	37.1224°N 105.1858°W
137	Hyndman Peak (Note: The summit of Hyndman Peak is the highest point of Pioneer Mountains (Idaho).)	Idaho	Pioneer Mountains (Idaho)	12,008 ft 3660 m	4,810 ft 1466 m	30.2 mi 48.6 km	43.7495°N 114.1311°W
137	Ruby Dome (Note: The summit of Ruby Dome is the highest point of the Ruby Mountains.) (Note: The elevation of Ruby Dome includes an adjustment of +1.429 m (4.69 ft) from NGVD 29 to NAVD 88.)	Nevada	Ruby Mountains	11,392 ft 3472 m	4,810 ft 1466 m	94.7 mi 152.5 km	40.6217°N 115.4754°W
137	Round Mountain (Note: The elevation of Round Mountain includes an adjustment of +1.188 m (3.9 ft) from NGVD 29 to NAVD 88.)	Washington	Cascade Range	5,344 ft 1629 m	4,810 ft 1466 m	8.67 mi 13.95 km	48.3265°N 121.7507°W
140	Mount Pinos (Note: The summit of Mount Pinos is the highest point of the San Emigdio Mountains.)	California	San Emigdio Mountains	8,847 ft 2696.5 m	4,800 ft 1463 m	82.9 mi 133.5 km	34.8128°N 119.1454°W
141	Mount Spickard	Washington	Skagit Range	8,980 ft 2737.2 m	4,799 ft 1463 m	18.78 mi 30.2 km	48.9697°N 121.2405°W
142	Troy Peak (Note: The summit of Troy Peak is the highest point of the Grant Range.)	Nevada	Grant Range	11,302 ft 3445 m	4,790 ft 1460 m	40 mi 64.3 km	38.3194°N 115.5019°W
143	Granite Peak (Note: The summit of Granite Peak is the highest point of the Beartooth Mountains and the U.S. State of Montana.)	Montana	Beartooth Mountains	12,807 ft 3903.5 m	4,779 ft 1457 m	86 mi 138.5 km	45.1634°N 109.8075°W
143	Cleave Peak (Peak 7500)	Alaska	Chugach Mountains	7,550 ft 2301 m	4,779 ft 1457 m	11.86 mi 19.08 km	61.1256°N 145.3006°W
145	Mount Jarvis	Alaska	Wrangell Mountains	13,421 ft 4091 m	4,771 ft 1454 m	11.15 mi 17.95 km	62.0234°N 143.6198°W
146	Copper Butte (Note: The summit of Copper Butte is the highest point of the Kettle River Range.)	Washington	Columbia Mountains	7,150 ft 2179.3 m	4,760 ft 1451 m	30.2 mi 48.7 km	48.7025°N 118.4656°W
147	Chunekukleik Mountain	Alaska	Saint Elias Mountains	5,780 ft 1762 m	4,730 ft 1442 m	7.61 mi 12.24 km	59.2919°N 135.9529°W
148	Mount Baldy (Note: The summit of Mount Baldy is the highest point of the White Mountains.)	Arizona	White Mountains	11,409 ft 3477.4 m	4,728 ft 1441 m	154 mi 248 km	33.9059°N 109.5626°W
149	Delano Peak (Note: The summit of Delano Peak is the highest point of the Tushar Mountains.)	Utah	Tushar Mountains	12,174 ft 3710.7 m	4,709 ft 1435 m	112.1 mi 180.5 km	38.3692°N 112.3714°W
150	Double Peak	Alaska	Chigmit Mountains	6,818 ft 2078 m	4,701 ft 1433 m	17.75 mi 28.6 km	60.7296°N 152.5861°W
151	Matterhorn (Note: The summit of Matterhorn is the highest point of the Jarbidge Mountains.) (Note: The elevation of Matterhorn includes an adjustment of +1.429 m (4.69 ft) from NGVD 29 to NAVD 88.)	Nevada	Jarbidge Mountains	10,843 ft 3305 m	4,688 ft 1429 m	60.4 mi 97.2 km	41.8107°N 115.3745°W
152	Mount Aylesworth	Alaska; British Columbia	Saint Elias Mountains	9,285 ft 2830 m	4,659 ft 1420 m	16.81 mi 27.1 km	59.9242°N 138.7985°W
153	Mount Hunter	Alaska	Alaska Range	14,573 ft 4442 m	4,653 ft 1418 m	6.88 mi 11.07 km	62.9504°N 151.0915°W
154	Mount Saint Helens (Note: The elevation of Mount Saint Helens includes an adjustment of +1.321 m (4.33 ft) from NGVD 29 to NAVD 88.)	Washington	Cascade Range	8,363 ft 2549 m	4,593 ft 1400 m	32 mi 51.5 km	46.1914°N 122.1956°W
155	Mount Reid (Note: The summit of Mount Reid is the highest point of Revillagigedo Island.)	Alaska	Revillagigedo Island	4,592 ft 1399.6 m	4,592 ft 1400 m	23.3 mi 37.5 km	55.7065°N 131.2472°W
156	Mount Wrightson (Note: The summit of Mount Wrightson is the highest point of the Santa Rita Mountains.) (Note: The elevation of Mount Wrightson includes an adjustment of +1.073 m (3.52 ft) from NGVD 29 to NAVD 88.)	Arizona	Santa Rita Mountains	2882 m 9,457 ft	1399 m 4,591 ft	62.5 km 38.8 mi	31.6959°N 110.8482°W
157	Currant Mountain (Note: The summit of Currant Mountain is the highest point of the White Pine Range.)	Nevada	White Pine Range	11,518 ft 3510.7 m	4,575 ft 1394 m	52.8 mi 85 km	38.9097°N 115.4246°W
158	Abajo Peak (Note: The summit of Abajo Peak is the highest point of the Abajo Mountains.)	Utah	Abajo Mountains	11,362 ft 3463 m	4,555 ft 1388 m	39.9 mi 64.2 km	37.8395°N 109.4624°W
159	Crestone Peak (Note: The summit of Crestone Peak is the highest point of the Crestones.) (Note: The elevation of Crestone Peak includes an adjustment of +1.76 m (5.77 ft) from NGVD 29 to NAVD 88.)	Colorado	Sangre de Cristo Range	14,300 ft 4359 m	4,554 ft 1388 m	27.4 mi 44 km	37.9669°N 105.5855°W
160	Kates Needle	Alaska; British Columbia	Coast Mountains	10,016 ft 3053 m	4,537 ft 1383 m	26 mi 41.8 km	57.0449°N 132.0451°W
161	Koniag Peak (Note: The summit of Koniag Peak is the highest point of Kodiak Island.)	Alaska	Kodiak Island	4,520 ft 1378 m	4,520 ft 1378 m	84.2 mi 135.5 km	57.3548°N 153.3235°W
162	Kuwohi (Note: Kuwohi on the border of North Carolina is the highest point of the U.S. State of Tennessee and the Great Smoky Mountains.) (Note: The elevation of Kuwohi includes an adjustment of +0.062 m (0.2 ft) from NGVD 29 to NAVD 88.)	North Carolina; Tennessee	Great Smoky Mountains	6,643 ft 2025 m	4,513 ft 1376 m	70.7 mi 113.9 km	35.5629°N 83.4986°W
163	Emory Peak (Note: The summit of Emory Peak is the highest point of the Chisos Mountains.) (Note: Emory Peak is the easternmost summit of its elevation in the United States.)	Texas	Chisos Mountains	7,812 ft 2381 m	4,495 ft 1370 m	46.2 mi 74.3 km	29.2460°N 103.3053°W
164	Cache Peak (Note: The summit of Cache Peak is the highest point of the Albion Range.)	Idaho	Albion Range	10,343 ft 3152.5 m	4,479 ft 1365 m	81.8 mi 131.6 km	42.1856°N 113.6611°W
165	Mount McLoughlin (Note: The summit of Mount McLoughlin is the highest point of the southern Oregon Cascades.) (Note: The elevation of Mount McLoughlin includes an adjustment of +1.306 m (4.28 ft) from NGVD 29 to NAVD 88.)	Oregon	Cascade Range	9,499 ft 2895 m	4,475 ft 1364 m	69.5 mi 111.8 km	42.4445°N 122.3156°W
165	Kuskokwim high point (Note: The summit of Kuskokwim high point is the highest point of the Kuskokwim Mountains.)	Alaska	Kuskokwim Mountains	5,250 ft 1600 m	4,475 ft 1364 m	191.6 mi 308 km	60.1159°N 159.3241°W
167	Northwest Peak (Note: The summit of Northwest Peak is the highest point of the Buckhorn Mountains.) (Note: The elevation of Northwest Peak includes an adjustment of +1.339 m (4.39 ft) from NGVD 29 to NAVD 88.)	Montana	Columbia Mountains	7,709 ft 2350 m	4,455 ft 1358 m	24.1 mi 38.8 km	48.9632°N 115.9683°W
168	Junipero Serra Peak (Note: The summit of Junipero Serra Peak is the highest point of the Santa Lucia Range.) (Note: The elevation of Junipero Serra Peak includes an adjustment of +0.971 m (3.19 ft) from NGVD 29 to NAVD 88.)	California	Santa Lucia Range	5,865 ft 1788 m	4,447 ft 1355 m	131.8 mi 212 km	36.1457°N 121.4191°W
169	Hualapai Peak (Note: The summit of Hualapai Peak is the highest point of the Hualapai Mountains.)	Arizona	Hualapai Mountains	8,426 ft 2568.2 m	4,439 ft 1353 m	95.2 mi 153.2 km	35.0751°N 113.8979°W
170	Mount Shuksan (Note: The elevation of Mount Shuksan includes an adjustment of +1.339 m (4.39 ft) from NGVD 29 to NAVD 88.)	Washington	Skagit Range	9,135 ft 2784 m	4,431 ft 1351 m	10.36 mi 16.68 km	48.8315°N 121.6032°W
171	Table Mountain (Note: The summit of Table Mountain is the highest point of the Highland Mountains.) (Note: The elevation of Table Mountain includes an adjustment of +1.467 m (4.81 ft) from NGVD 29 to NAVD 88.)	Montana	Highland Mountains	10,228 ft 3117 m	4,422 ft 1348 m	19.3 mi 31.1 km	45.7426°N 112.4619°W
172	Mount Stimson	Montana	Lewis Range	10,146 ft 3092.6 m	4,402 ft 1342 m	30 mi 48.3 km	48.5142°N 113.6104°W
173	Kintla Peak (Note: The summit of Kintla Peak is the highest point of the Livingston Range.) (Note: The elevation of Kintla Peak includes an adjustment of +1.413 m (4.64 ft) from NGVD 29 to NAVD 88.)	Montana	Livingston Range	10,106 ft 3080 m	4,401 ft 1341 m	14.78 mi 23.8 km	48.9437°N 114.1714°W
174	Granite Peak (Note: The summit of Granite Peak is the highest point of the Santa Rosa Range.)	Nevada	Santa Rosa Range	9,732 ft 2966.3 m	4,400 ft 1341 m	82.4 mi 132.6 km	41.6681°N 117.5889°W
175	Santiago Peak (Note: The summit of Santiago Peak is the highest point of the Santa Ana Mountains.)	California	Santa Ana Mountains	5,690 ft 1734.36 m	4,397 ft 1340 m	33.6 mi 54.1 km	33.7105°N 117.5342°W
176	Regal Mountain	Alaska	Wrangell Mountains	13,845 ft 4220 m	4,395 ft 1340 m	12.25 mi 19.72 km	61.7438°N 142.8675°W
177	Remmel Mountain (Note: The summit of Remmel Mountain is the highest point of the Cathedral Range.)	Washington	Okanogan Range	8,691 ft 2649.16 m	4,385 ft 1337 m	16.83 mi 27.1 km	48.9234°N 120.1968°W
178	Steens Mountain (Note: The elevation of Steens Mountain includes an adjustment of +1.496 m (4.91 ft) from NGVD 29 to NAVD 88.)	Oregon	Steens Mountain	9,738 ft 2968 m	4,383 ft 1336 m	124.7 mi 201 km	42.6364°N 118.5767°W
179	Mount Osborn (Note: The summit of Mount Osborn is the highest point of the Seward Peninsula.)	Alaska	Seward Peninsula	4,714 ft 1437 m	4,377 ft 1334 m	282 mi 453 km	64.9922°N 165.3294°W
180	Eagle Peak (Note: The summit of Eagle Peak is the highest point of the Warner Mountains.)	California	Warner Mountains	9,895 ft 3016 m	4,362 ft 1330 m	87.4 mi 140.6 km	41.2835°N 120.2007°W
181	Herbert Volcano (Note: The summit of Herbert Volcano is the highest point of Herbert Island.)	Alaska	Herbert Island	4,300 ft 1310.6 m	4,300 ft 1311 m	9.07 mi 14.59 km	52.7405°N 170.1142°W
182	Katahdin (Note: The summit of Katahdin is the highest point of the Longfellow Mountains and the U.S. State of Maine.) (Note: Katahdin is the easternmost 1000-meter (3281-foot) summit of the United States.)	Maine	Longfellow Mountains	5,270 ft 1606.4 m	4,293 ft 1309 m	158.3 mi 255 km	45.9044°N 68.9213°W
183	Chicoma Mountain (Note: The summit of Chicoma Mountain is the highest point of the Jemez Mountains.)	New Mexico	Jemez Mountains	11,561 ft 3523.8 m	4,291 ft 1308 m	35.3 mi 56.8 km	36.0073°N 106.3846°W
184	Mount Kanaga (Note: The summit of Mount Kanaga is the highest point of Kanaga Island.)	Alaska	Kanaga Island	4,287 ft 1306.7 m	4,287 ft 1307 m	42 mi 67.6 km	51.9238°N 177.1623°W
185	Uncompahgre Peak (Note: The summit of Uncompahgre Peak is the highest point of the San Juan Mountains and the entire Gulf of California drainage basin.) (Note: Uncompahgre Peak is the westernmost summit of its elevation in the Rocky Mountains.)	Colorado	San Juan Mountains	14,321 ft 4365 m	4,277 ft 1304 m	85 mi 136.8 km	38.0717°N 107.4621°W
186	Clark Mountain (Note: The summit of Clark Mountain is the highest point of the Clark Mountain Range.)	California	Clark Mountain Range	7,933 ft 2418.1 m	4,255 ft 1297 m	29.1 mi 46.9 km	35.5256°N 115.5887°W
187	Mount Akutan (Note: The summit of Mount Akutan is the highest point of Akutan Island.)	Alaska	Akutan Island	4,251 ft 1295.7 m	4,251 ft 1296 m	42.3 mi 68.1 km	54.1330°N 165.9854°W
188	Navajo Mountain	Utah	Colorado Plateau	10,348 ft 3154.2 m	4,236 ft 1291 m	58.6 mi 94.3 km	37.0343°N 110.8697°W
189	Bearpaw Baldy (Note: The summit of Bearpaw Baldy is the highest point of the Bearpaw Mountains.)	Montana	Bearpaw Mountains	6,921 ft 2109.4 m	4,229 ft 1289 m	62.8 mi 101 km	48.1487°N 109.6509°W
190	Jack Mountain (Note: The summit of Jack Mountain is the highest point of the Hozameen Range.)	Washington	Hozameen Range	9,075 ft 2766 m	4,211 ft 1284 m	16.32 mi 26.3 km	48.7728°N 120.9562°W
191	Accomplishment Peak (Note: The summit of Accomplishment Peak is the highest point of the Philip Smith Mountains.)	Alaska	Brooks Range	8,045 ft 2452 m	4,195 ft 1279 m	86.5 mi 139.2 km	68.4433°N 148.0947°W
192	Mount Patterson (Note: The summit of Mount Patterson is the highest point of the Sweetwater Range.) (Note: The elevation of Mount Patterson includes an adjustment of +1.734 m (5.69 ft) from NGVD 29 to NAVD 88.)	California	Sweetwater Range	11,679 ft 3560 m	4,173 ft 1272 m	18.5 mi 29.8 km	38.4366°N 119.3052°W
193	Mount Tozi (Note: The summit of Mount Tozi is the highest point of the Ray Mountains.)	Alaska	Ray Mountains	5,519 ft 1682 m	4,169 ft 1271 m	99.5 mi 160.1 km	65.6865°N 150.9498°W
194	Mount Chamberlin (Note: The summit of Mount Chamberlin is the highest point of the Franklin Mountains.) (Note: Mount Chamberlin is the northernmost 2000-meter (6562-foot) summit of Alaska and the United States.)	Alaska	Brooks Range	8,901 ft 2713 m	4,151 ft 1265 m	27.2 mi 43.9 km	69.2775°N 144.9107°W
195	Mount Edith (Note: The summit of Mount Edith is the highest point of the Big Belt Mountains.) (Note: The elevation of Mount Edith includes an adjustment of +1.249 m (4.1 ft) from NGVD 29 to NAVD 88.)	Montana	Big Belt Mountains	9,504 ft 2897 m	4,110 ft 1253 m	37 mi 59.5 km	46.4318°N 111.1862°W
196	Sandia Crest (Note: The summit of Sandia Crest is the highest point of the Sandia Mountains.)	New Mexico	Sandia Mountains	10,682 ft 3256 m	4,098 ft 1249 m	45.3 mi 72.9 km	35.2100°N 106.4495°W
197	Mount Taylor (Note: The summit of Mount Taylor is the highest point of the northern San Mateo Mountains.)	New Mexico	San Mateo Mountains	11,305 ft 3445.9 m	4,094 ft 1248 m	86.8 mi 139.6 km	35.2387°N 107.6085°W
198	Hilgard Peak (Note: The summit of Hilgard Peak is the highest point of the Madison Range.) (Note: The elevation of Hilgard Peak includes an adjustment of +1.49 m (4.89 ft) from NGVD 29 to NAVD 88.)	Montana	Madison Range	11,321 ft 3451 m	4,063 ft 1238 m	76.4 mi 123 km	44.9166°N 111.4593°W
199	Kaʻala (Note: The summit of Kaʻala is the highest point of the Island of Oʻahu.)	Hawaii	Island of Oʻahu	4,060 ft 1237 m	4,060 ft 1237 m	84.4 mi 135.8 km	21.5079°N 158.1426°W
200	Francs Peak (Note: The summit of Francs Peak is the highest point of the Absaroka Range.)	Wyoming	Absaroka Range	13,164 ft 4012.3 m	4,056 ft 1236 m	47.2 mi 76 km	43.9613°N 109.3392°W

== Gallery ==
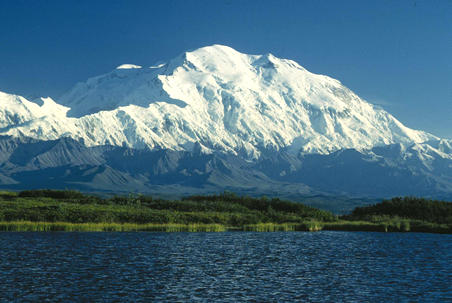
1. Denali in Alaska is the highest summit of the United States and all of North America.

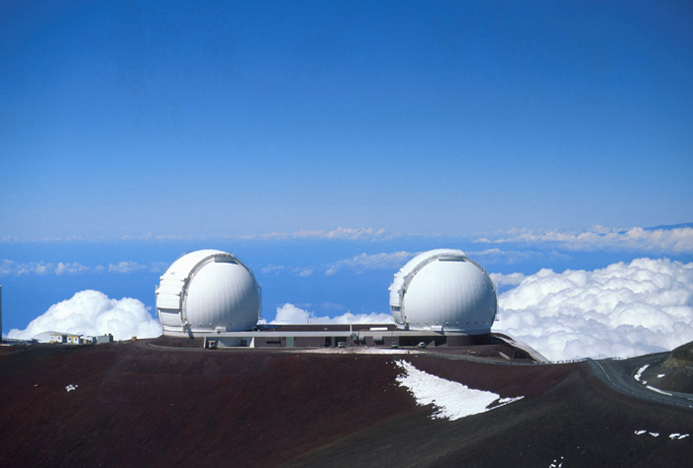
2. Mauna Kea on the Island of Hawaiʻi is the tallest mountain on Earth as measured from base (submarine in its case) to summit.

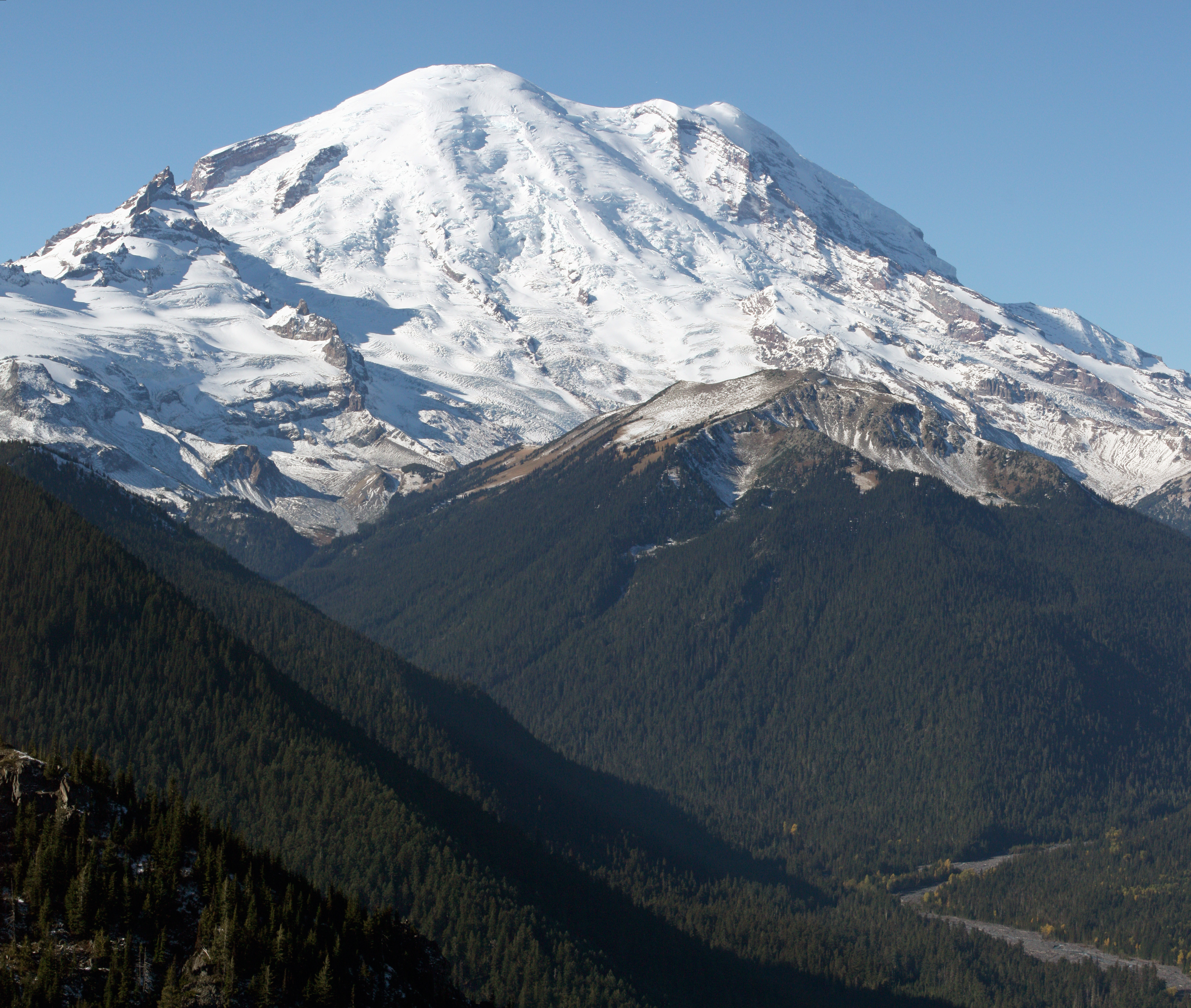
3. Mount Rainier is the highest summit of Washington and the Cascade Range.

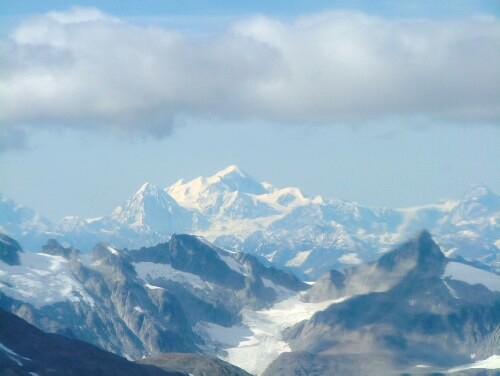
4. Mount Fairweather lies on the Alaska-British Columbia international border.

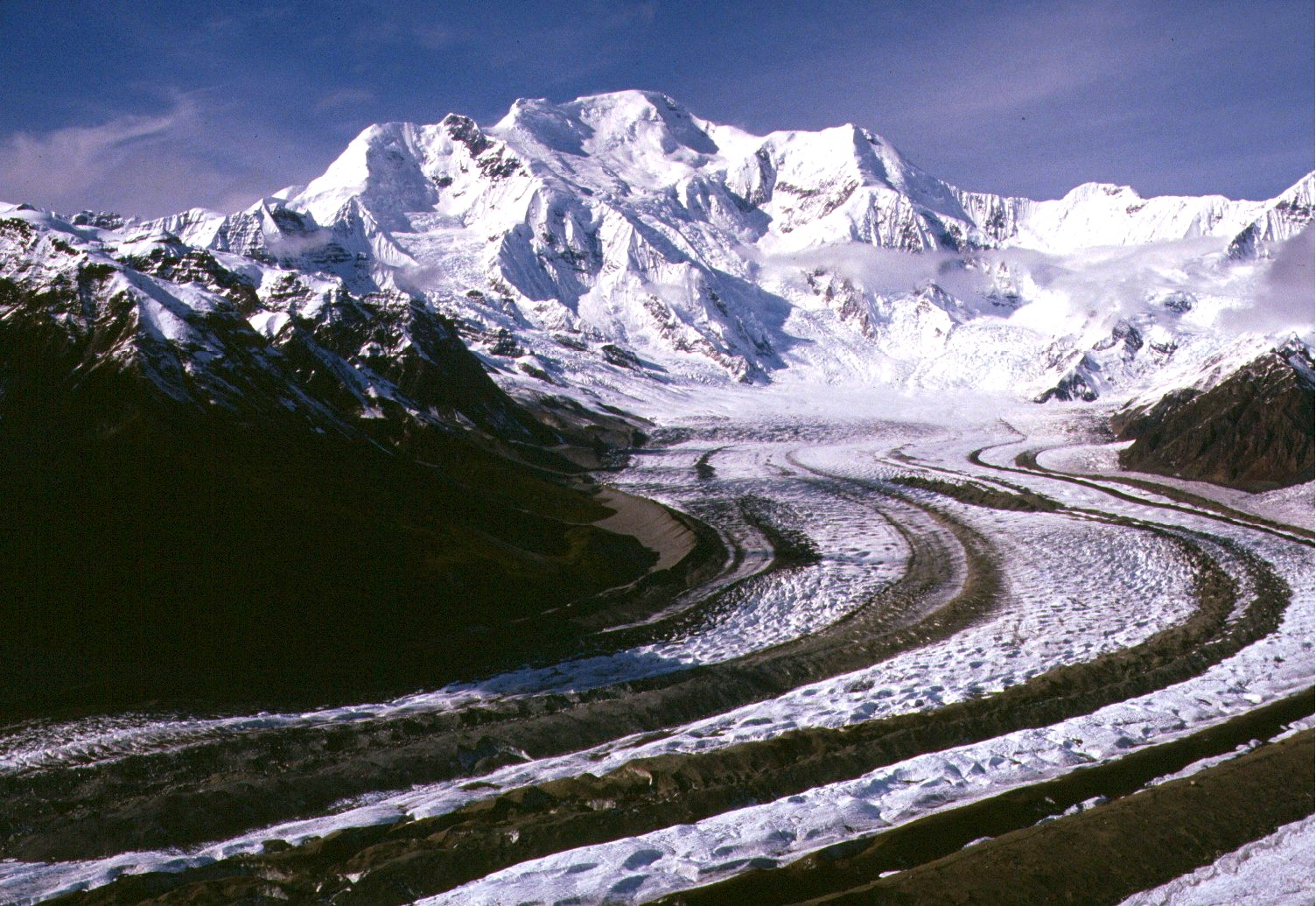
5. Mount Blackburn in Alaska is the highest summit of the Wrangell Mountains.

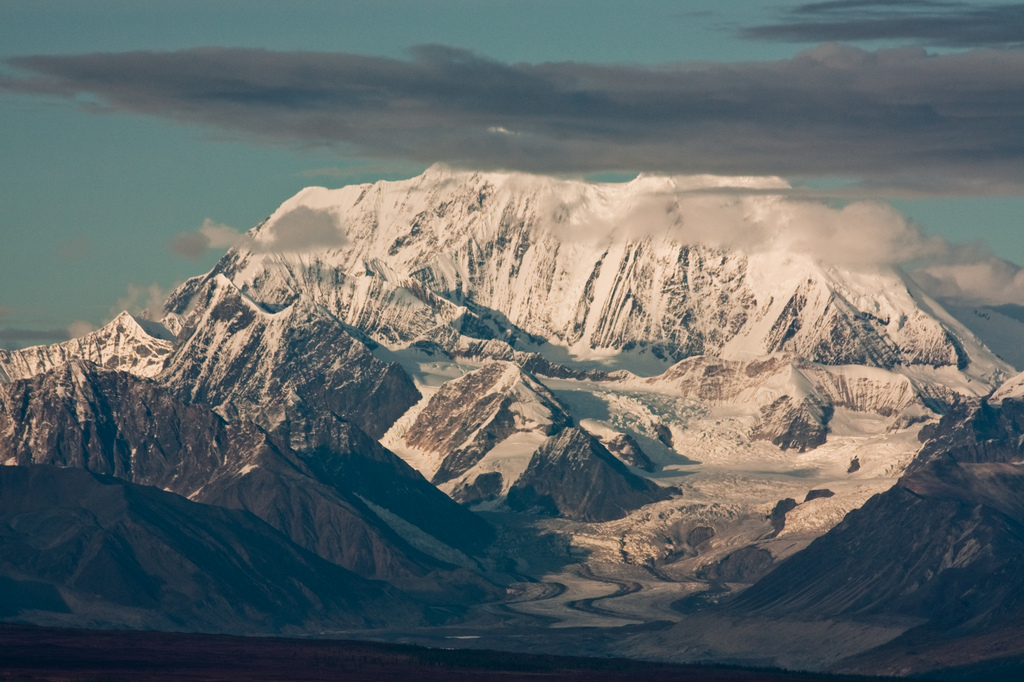
6. Mount Hayes is the highest summit of the eastern Alaska Range.

7. Mount Saint Elias is the second highest summit of both Canada and the United States.

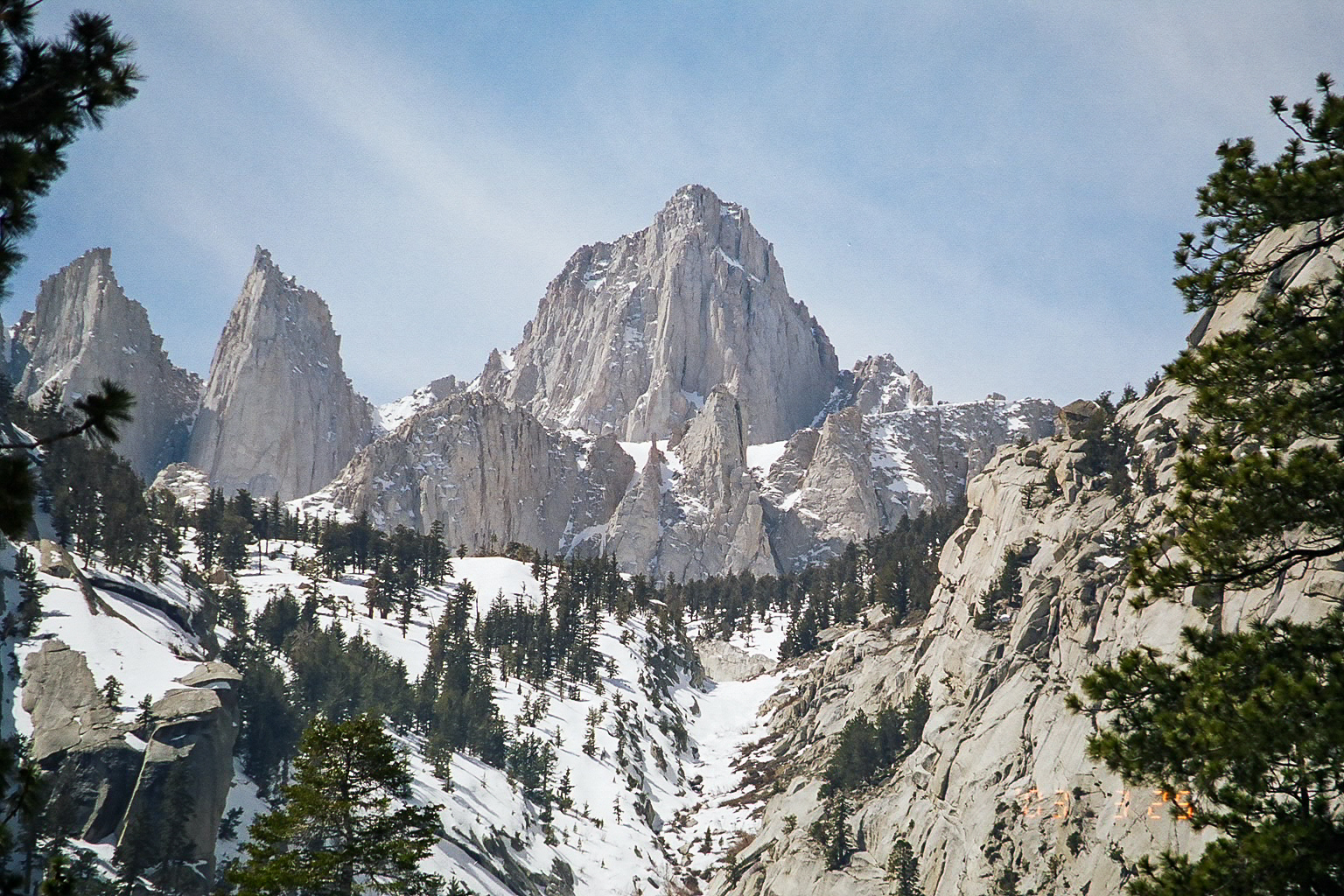
9. Mount Whitney is the highest summit of the Sierra Nevada and California.

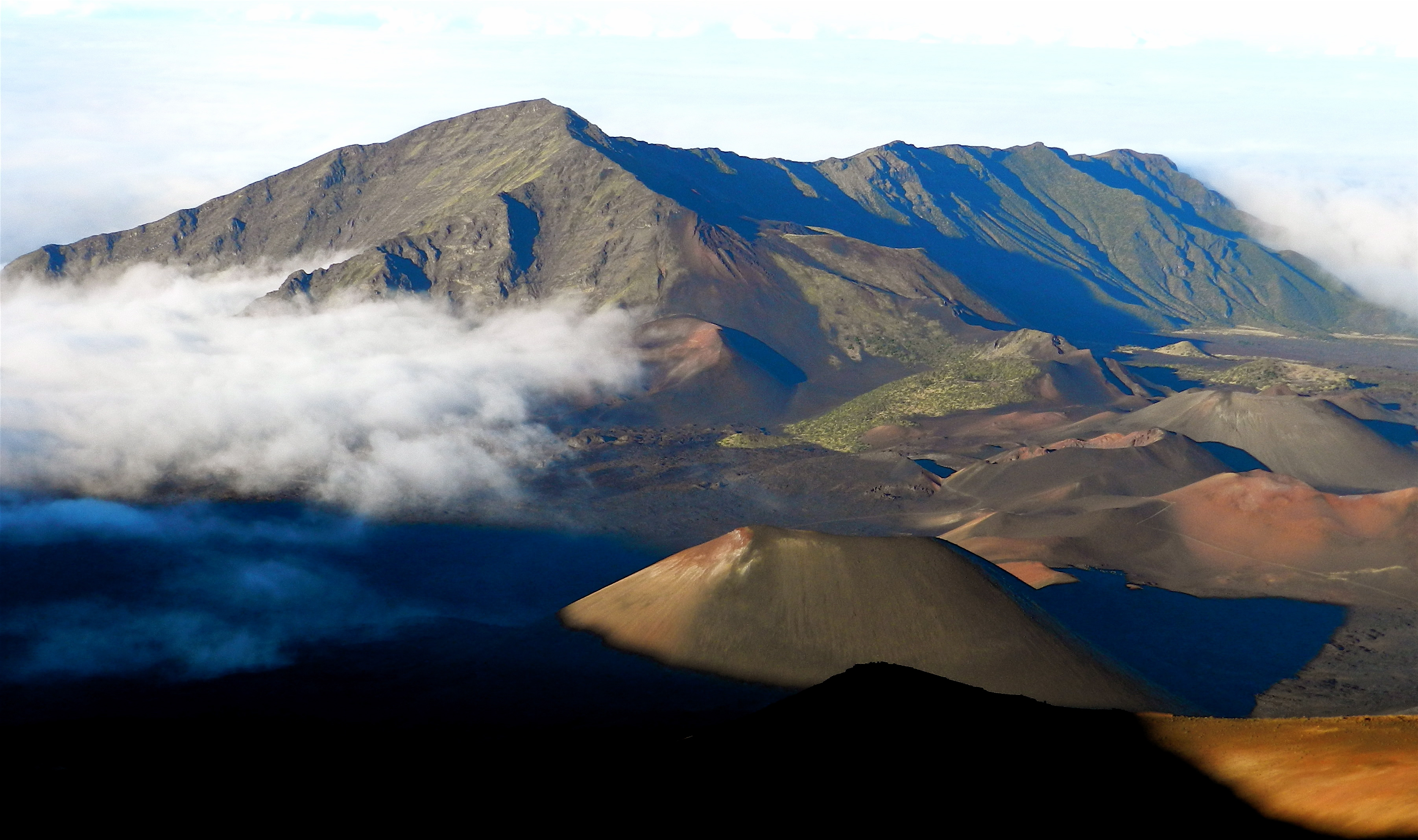
10. Haleakalā is the highest summit of the Island of Maui.

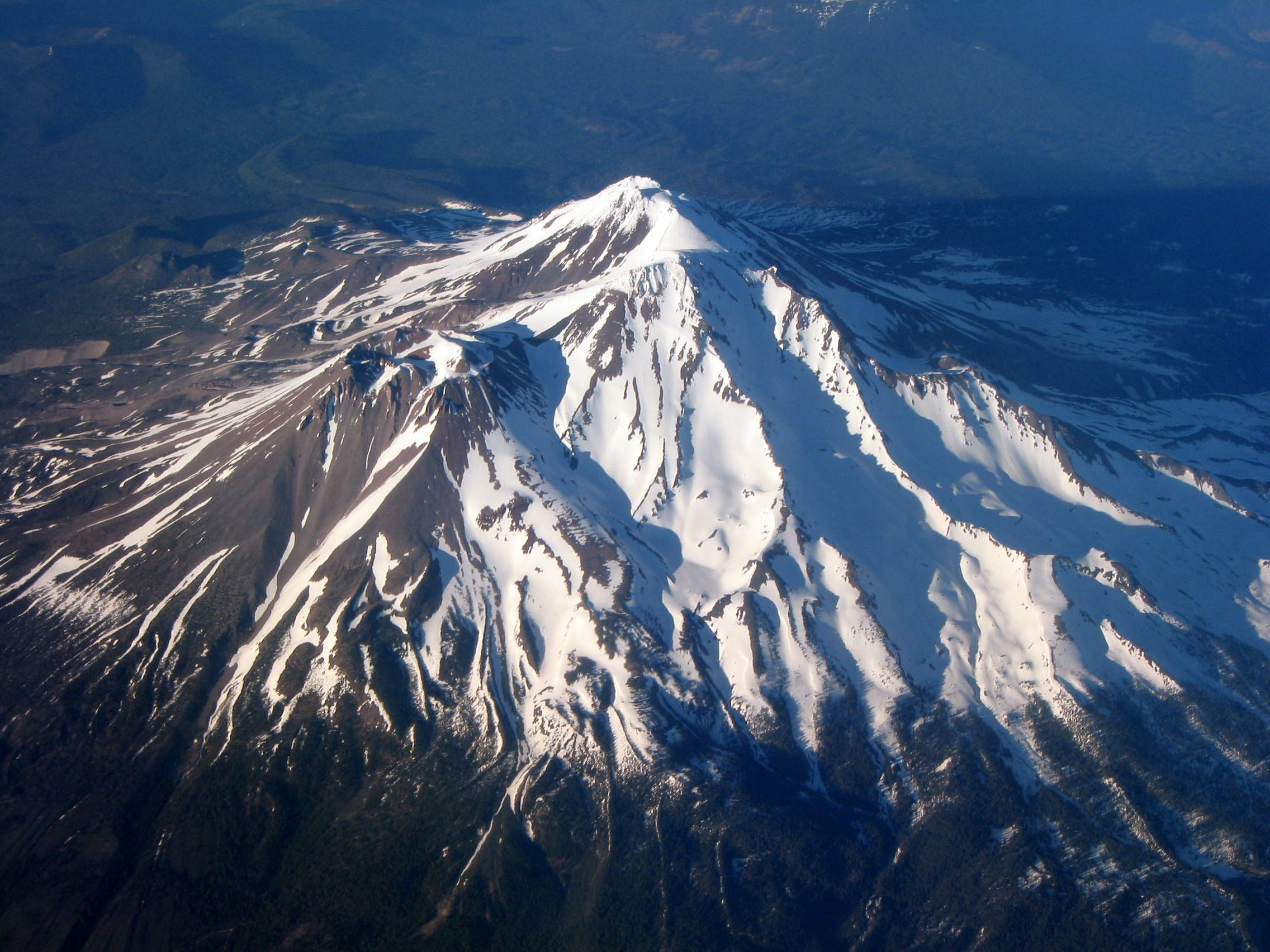
11. Mount Shasta in California is the highest summit of the southern Cascade Range.

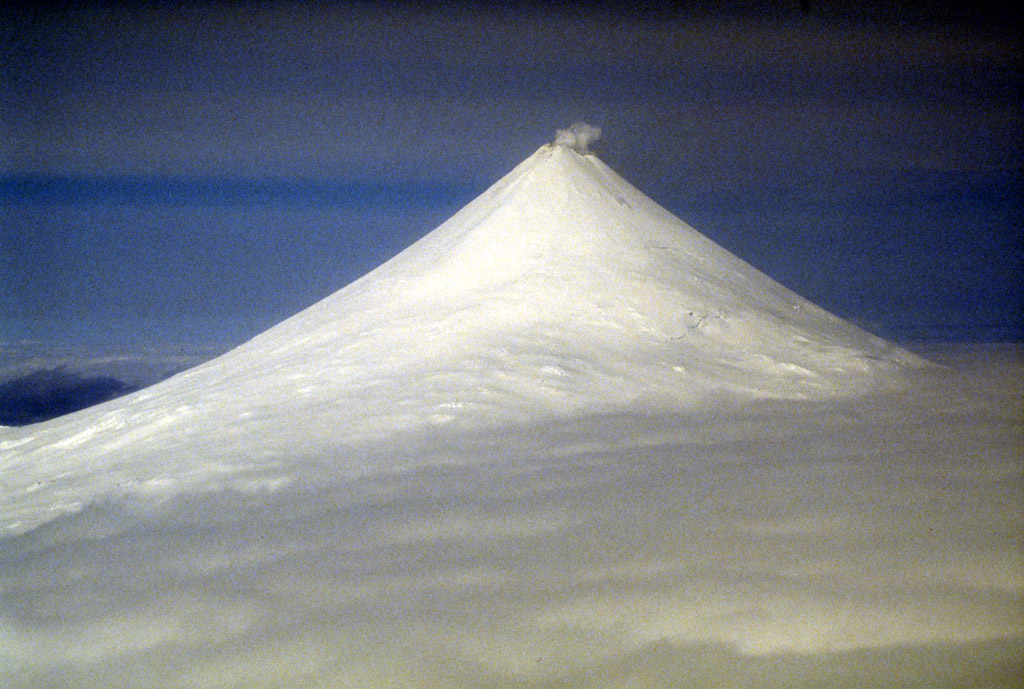
12. Mount Shishaldin on Unimak Island in Alaska is the highest summit of the Aleutian Islands.

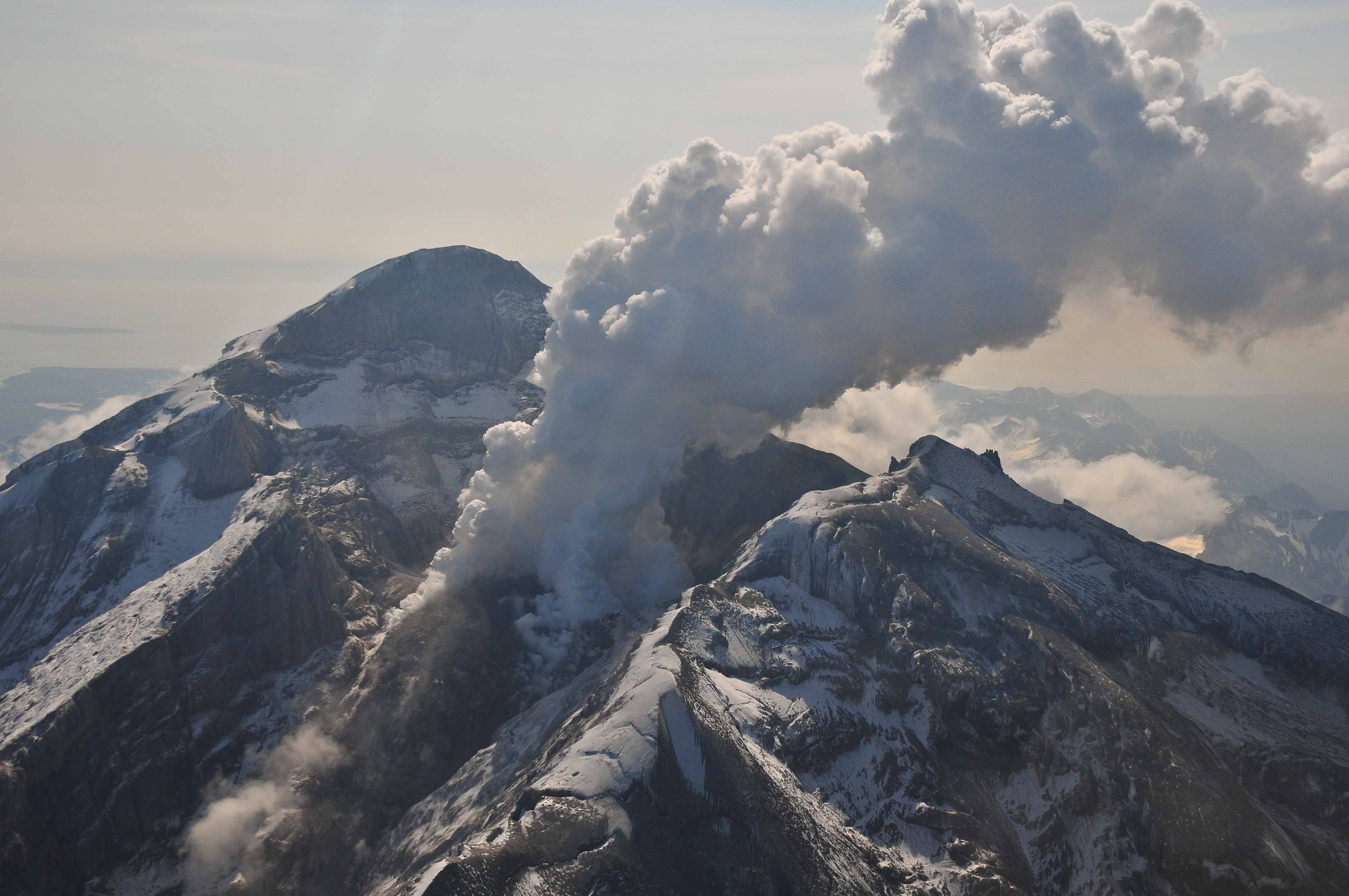
13. Redoubt Volcano is the highest summit of the Aleutian Range.

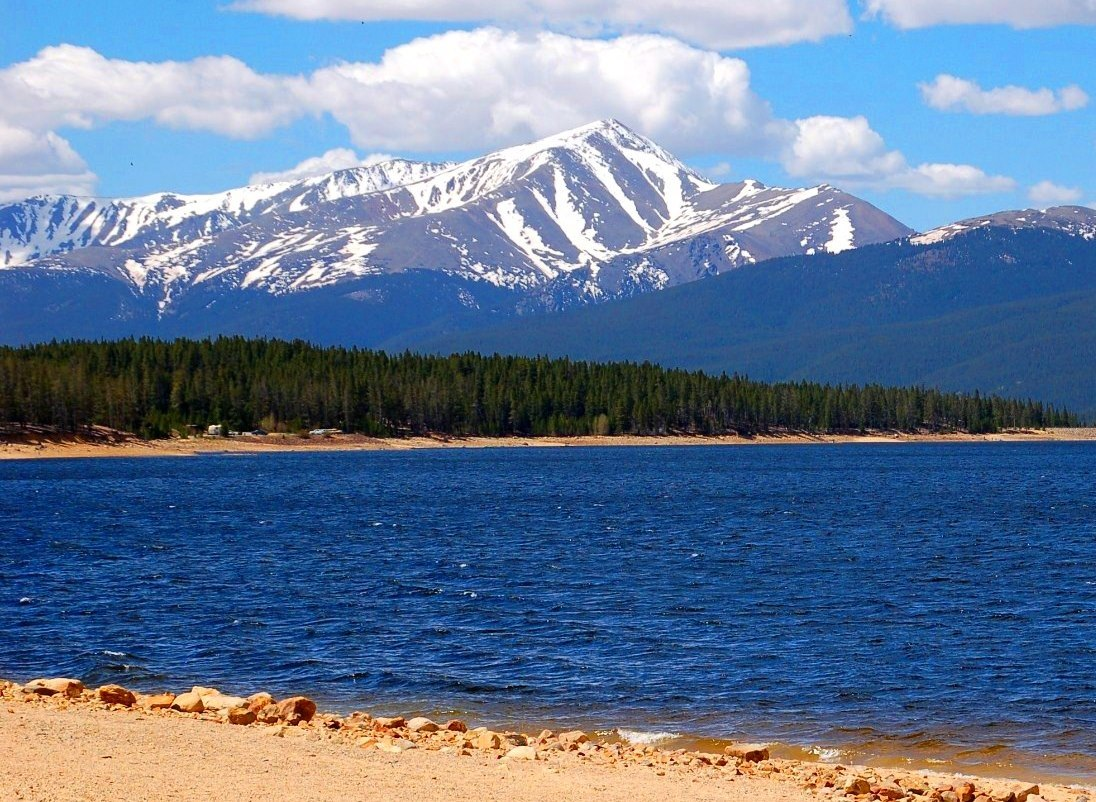
14. Mount Elbert is the highest summit of Colorado and the Rocky Mountains.

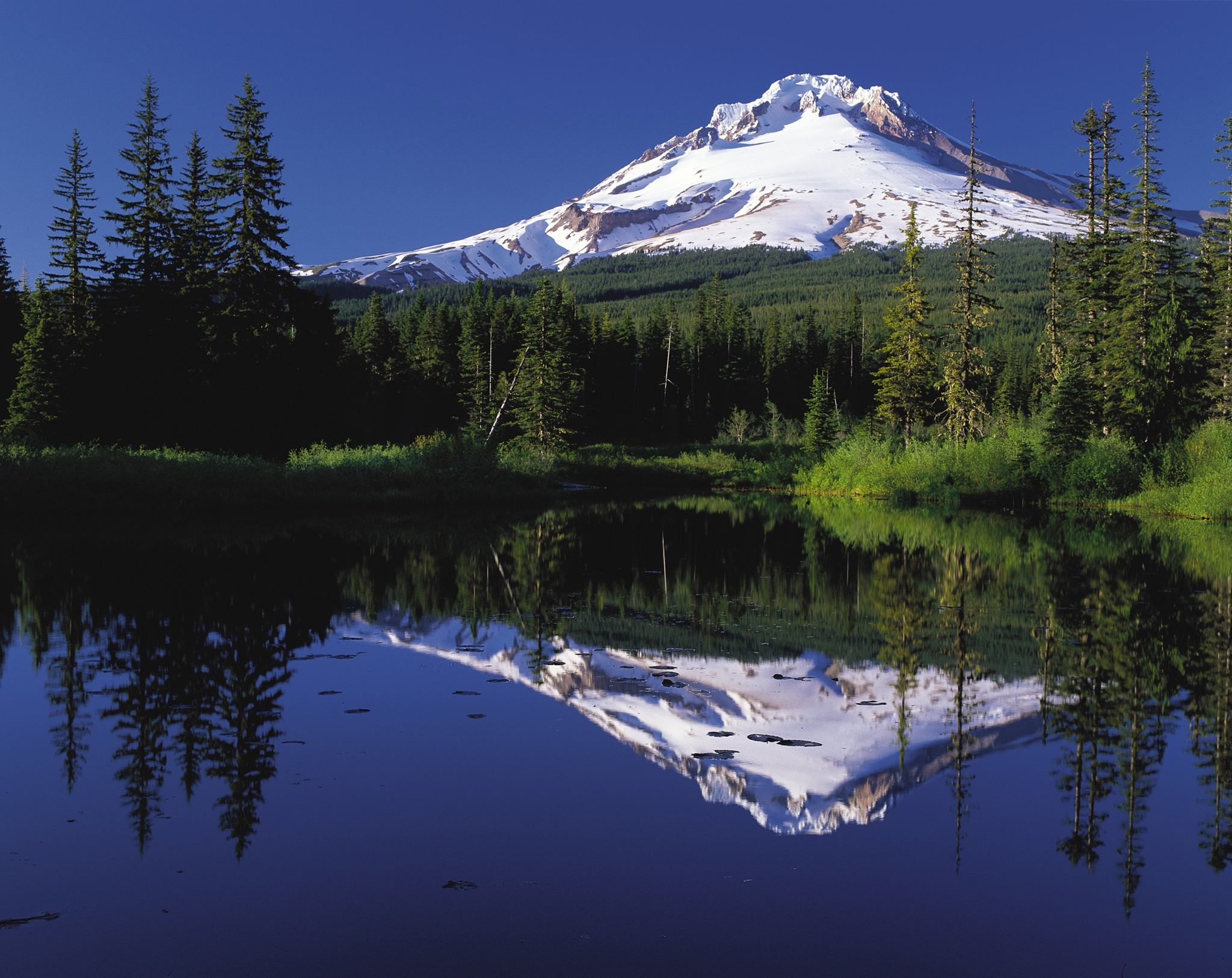
28. Mount Hood is the highest summit of Oregon.

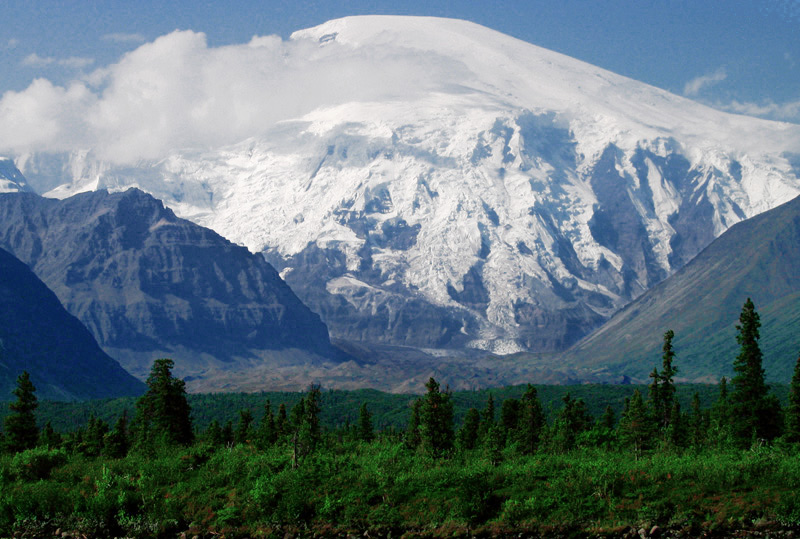
29. Mount Sanford in Alaska is the third highest volcano in the United States.

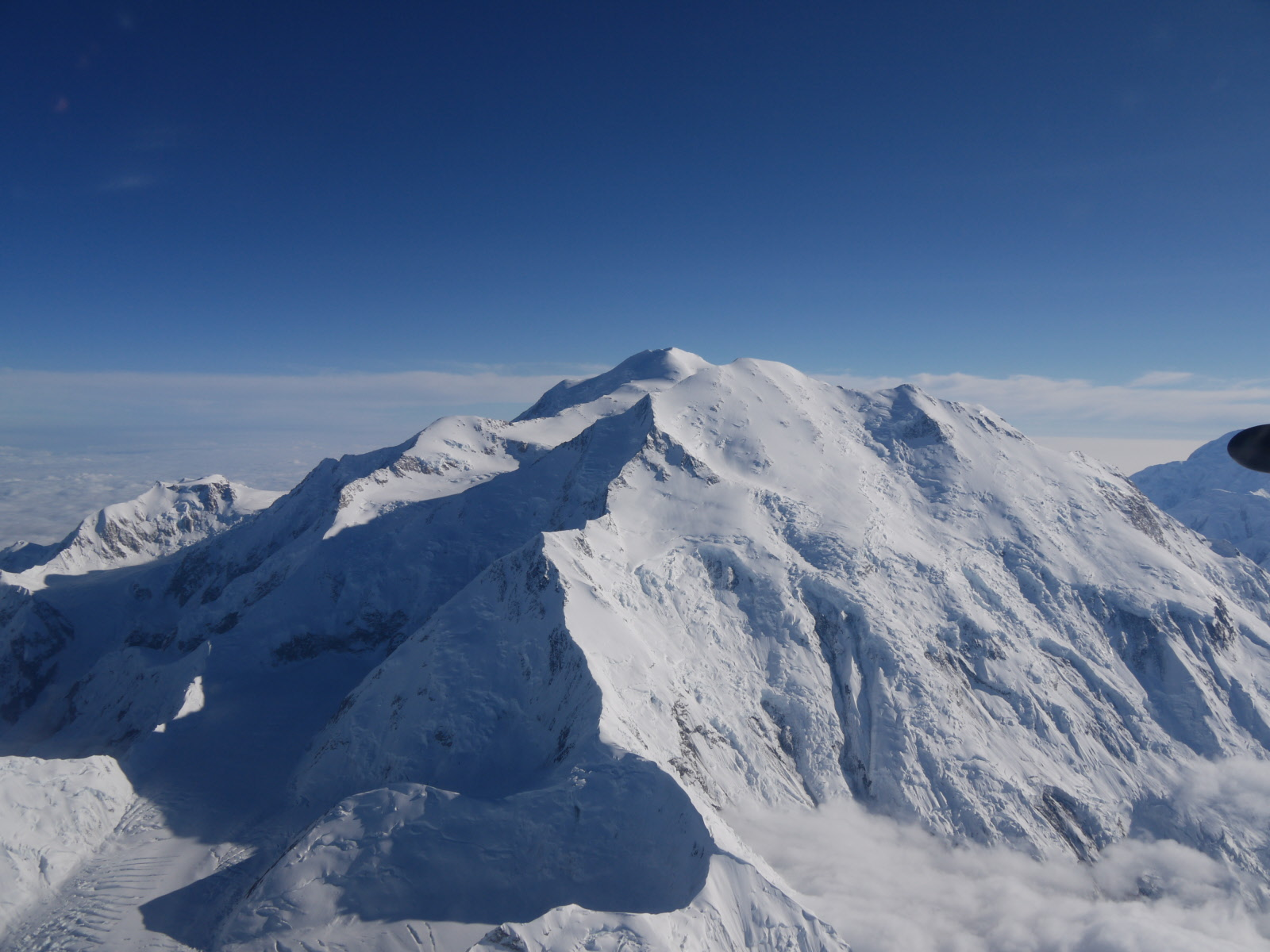
35. Mount Foraker is the second highest major summit of the Alaska Range.

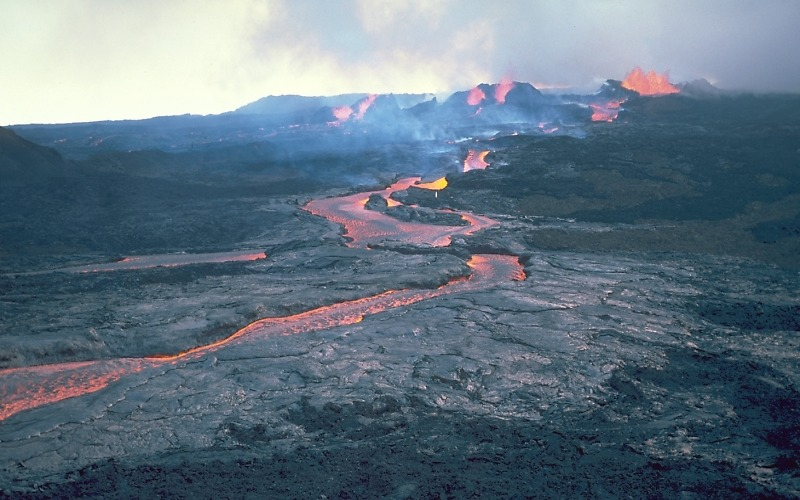
38. Mauna Loa on the Island of Hawaiʻi is the most voluminous mountain on Earth.

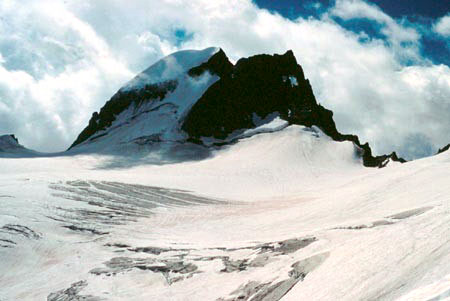
40. Gannett Peak is the highest summit of the Wind River Range and Wyoming.

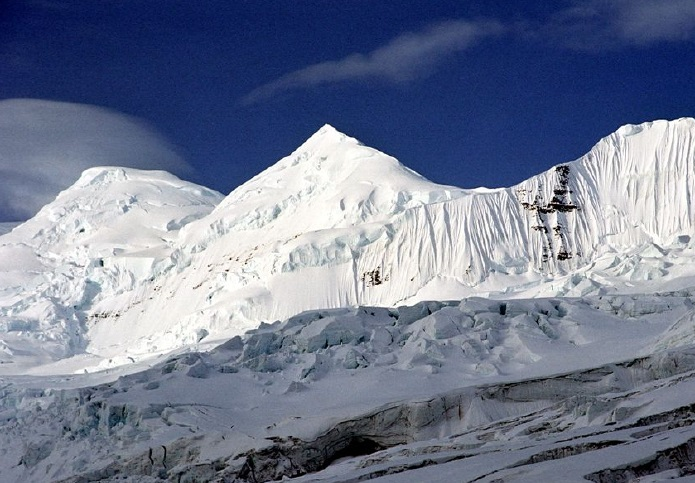
43. Mount Bona in Alaska is the highest volcano in the United States.

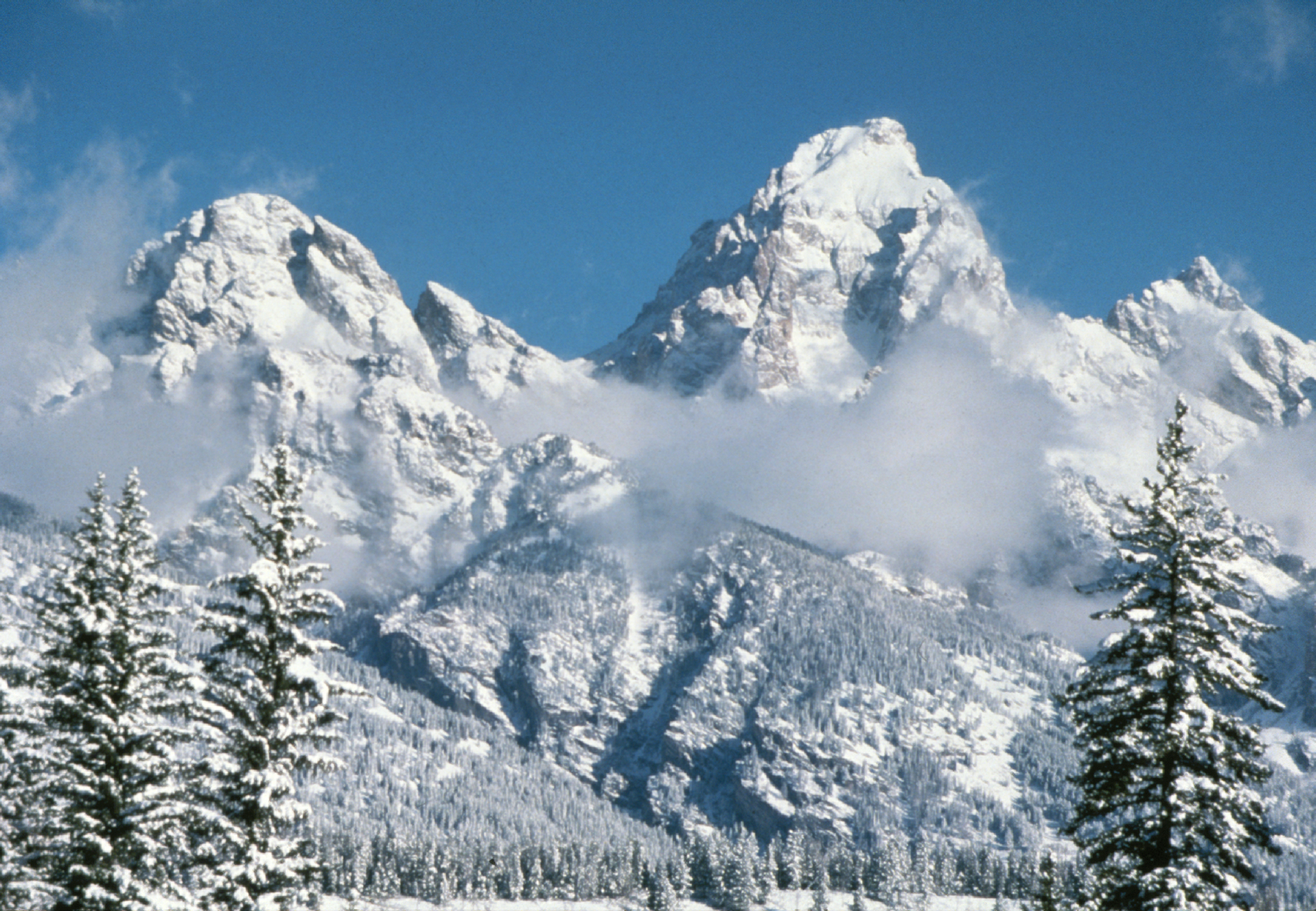
46. Grand Teton in Wyoming is the highest summit of the Teton Range.

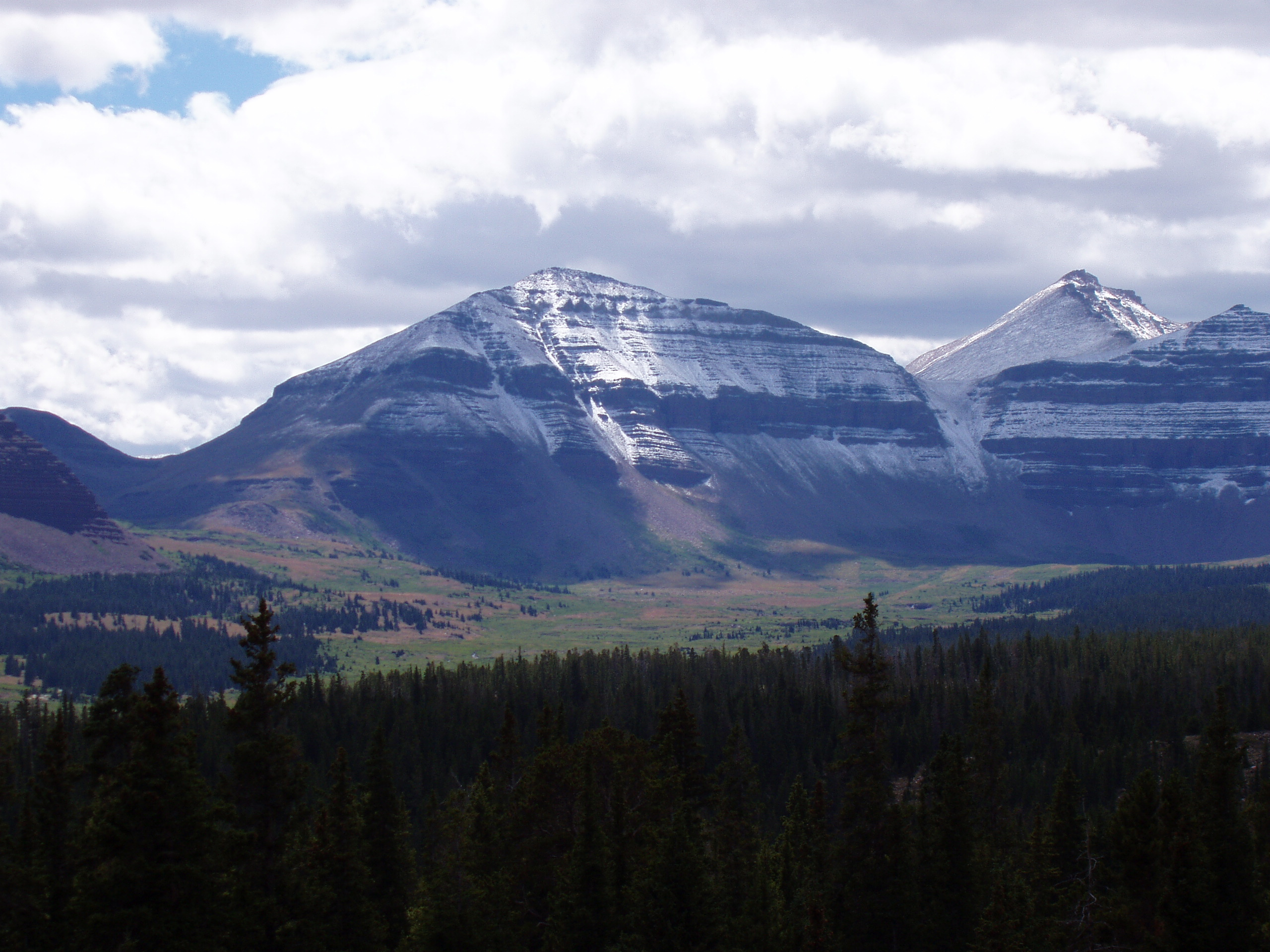
49. Kings Peak is the highest summit of the Uinta Range and Utah.

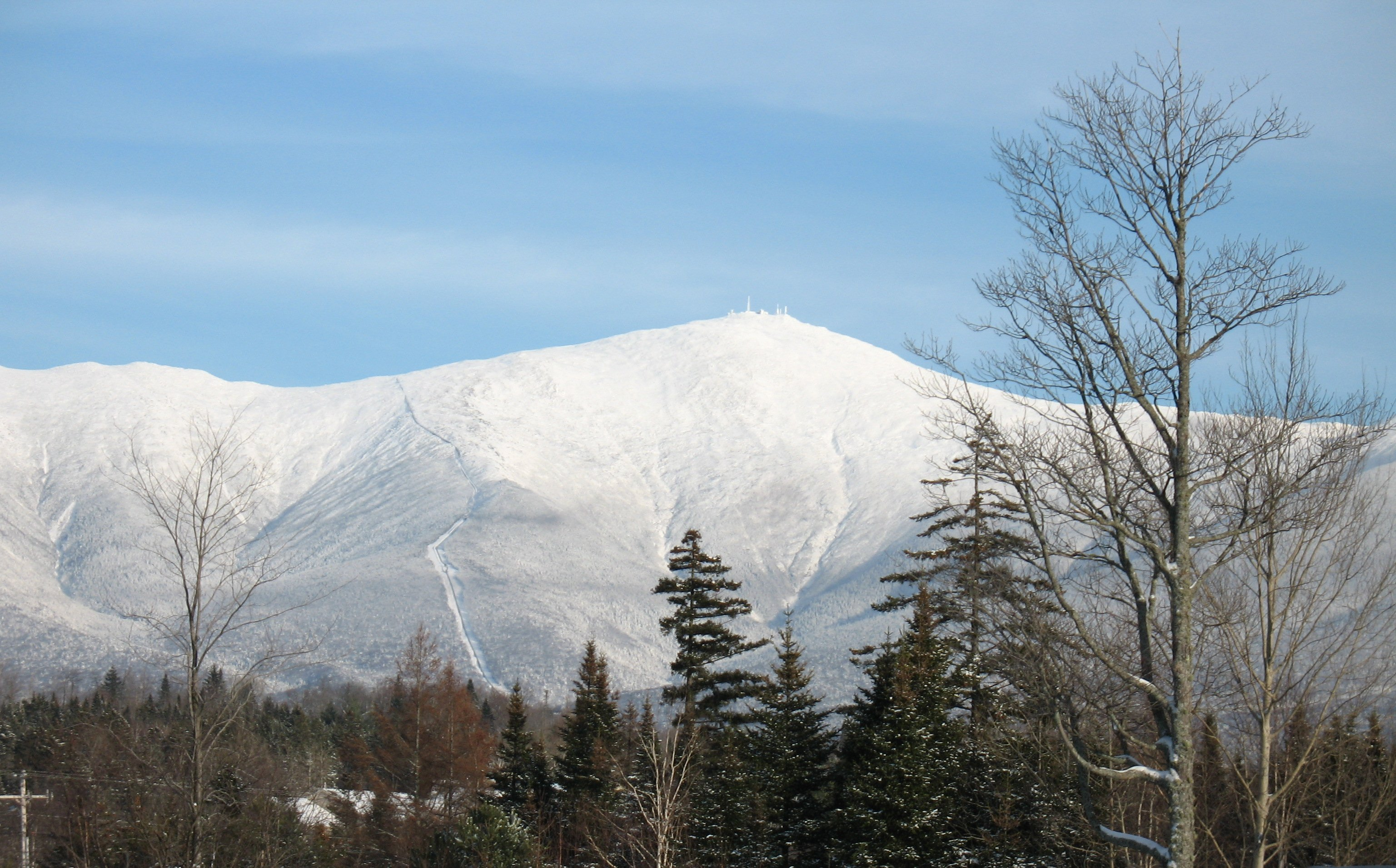
59. Mount Washington is the highest summit of the White Mountains and New Hampshire.

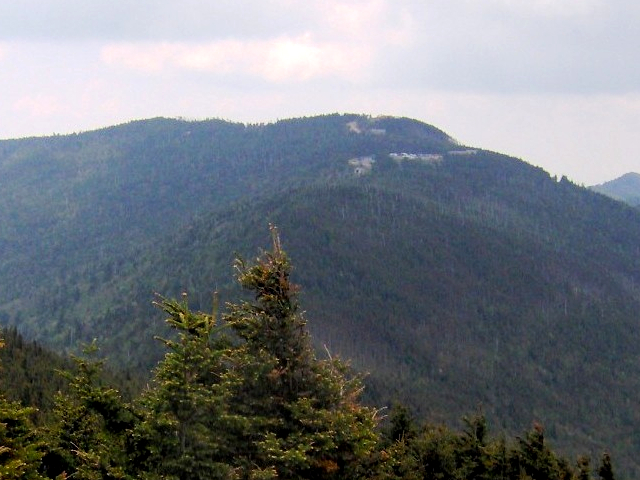
62. Mount Mitchell is the highest summit of North Carolina and the Appalachian Mountains.

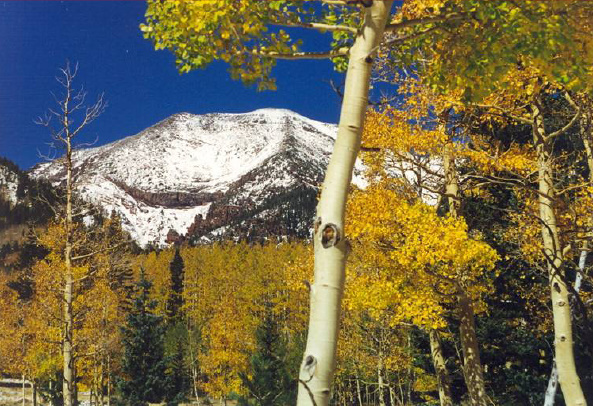
64. Humphreys Peak is the highest summit of the San Francisco Peaks and Arizona.

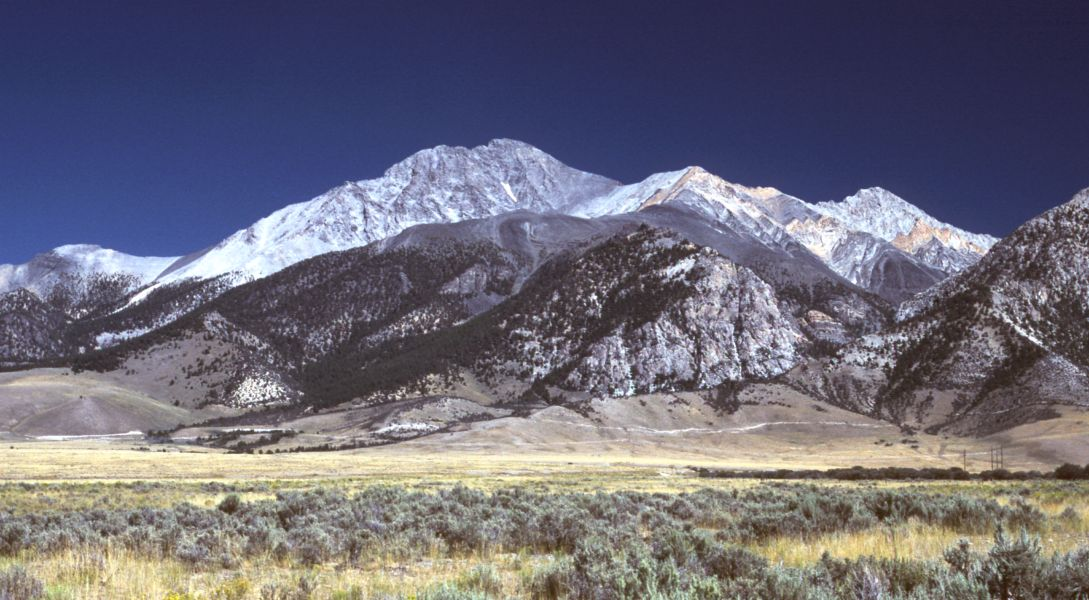
65. Borah Peak is the highest summit of the Lost River Range and Idaho.

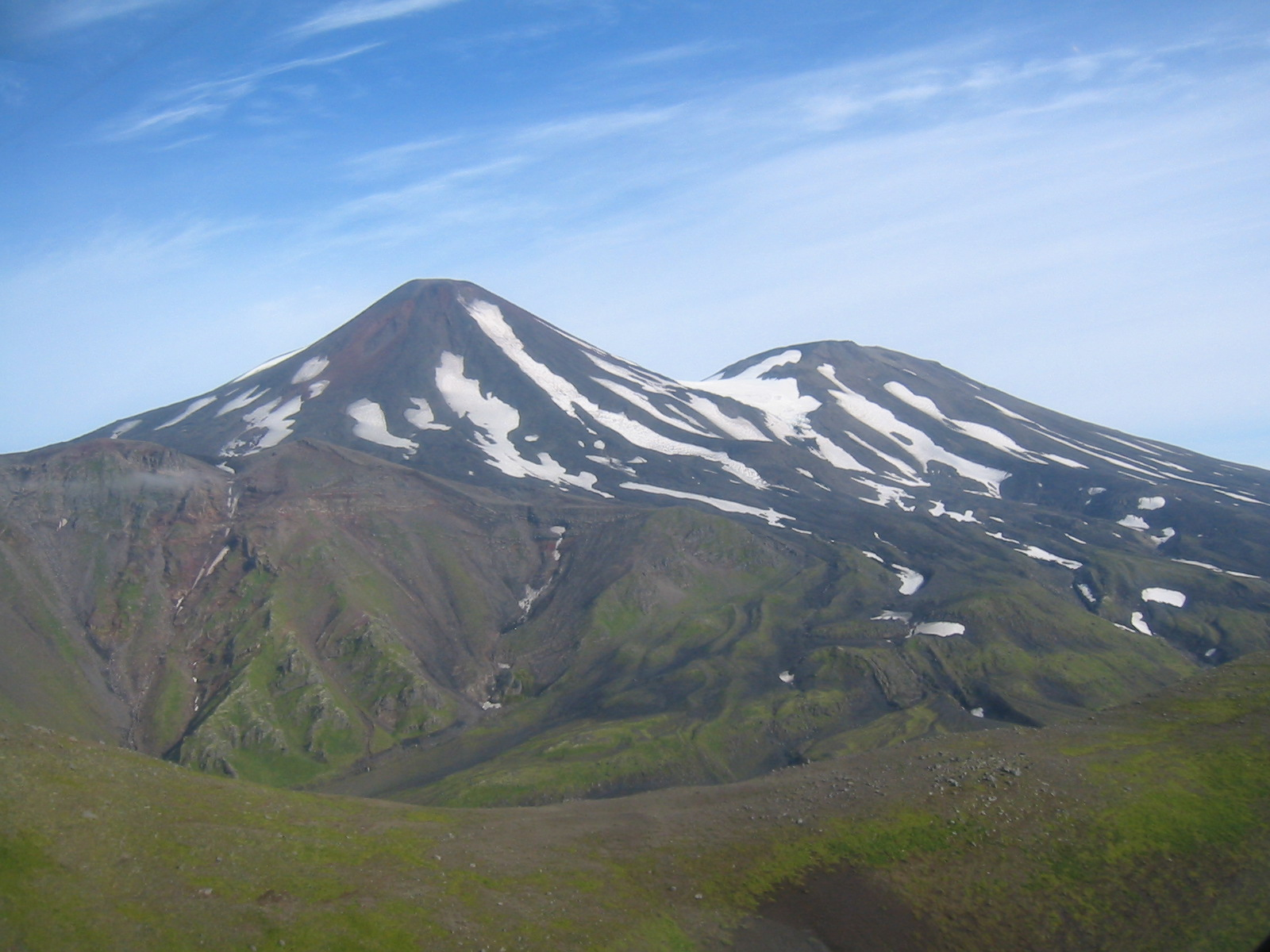
68. Tanaga Volcano is the highest summit of Tanaga Island in the Aleutian Islands.

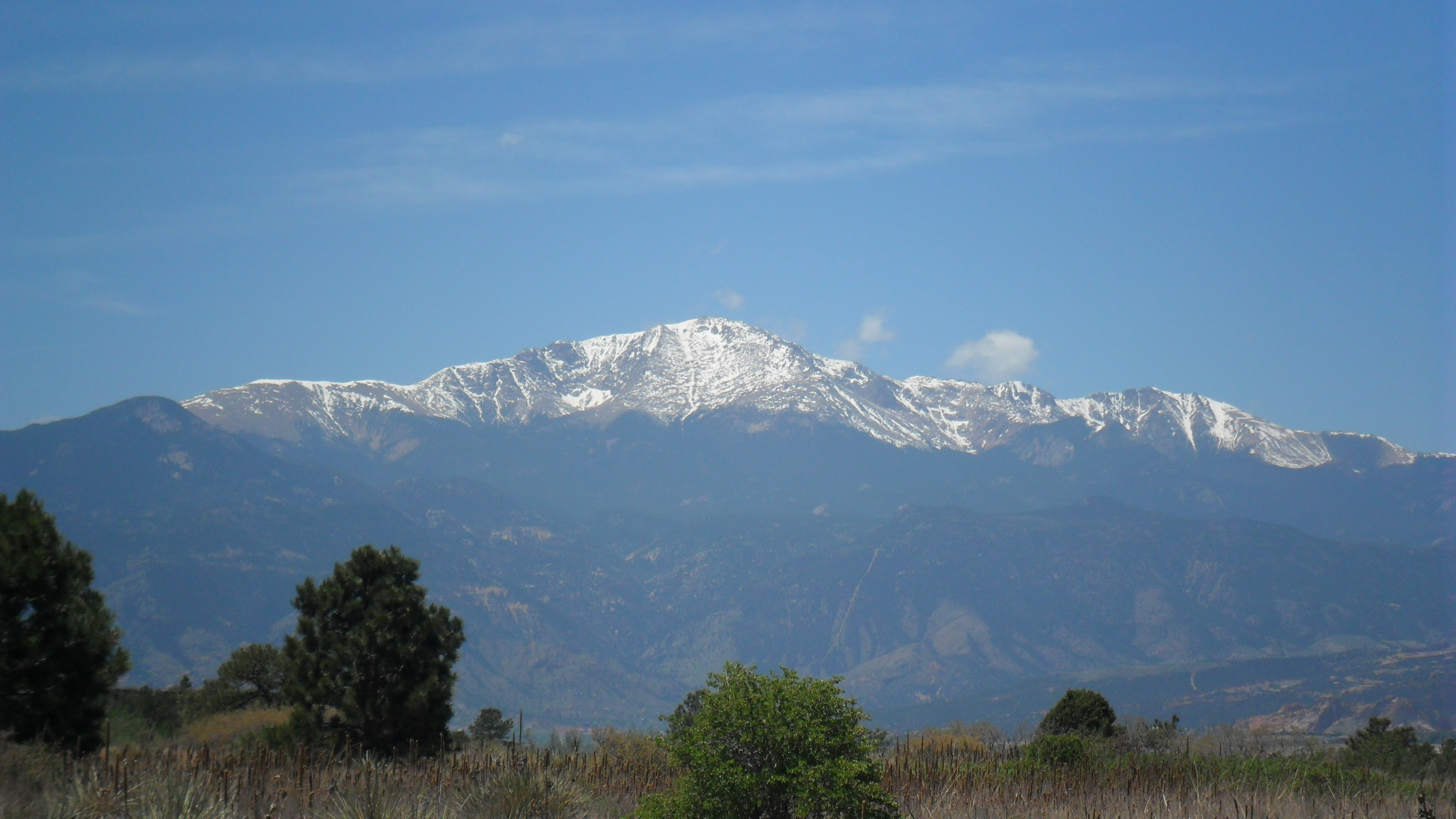
89. Pikes Peak in Colorado was the inspiration for America the Beautiful.

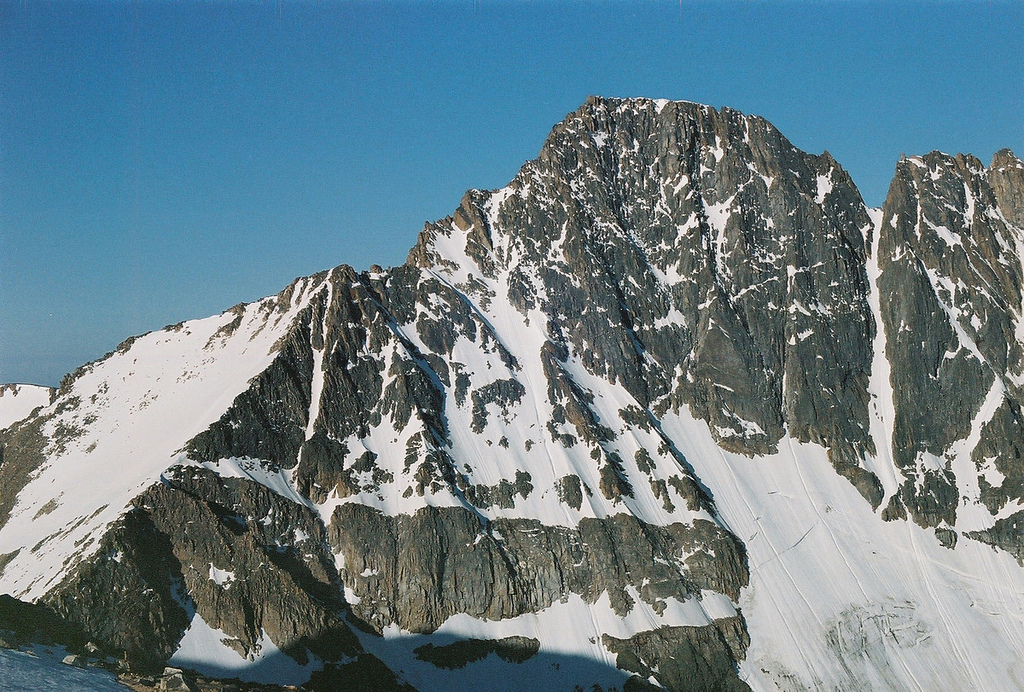
143. Granite Peak is the highest summit of the Beartooth Range and Montana.

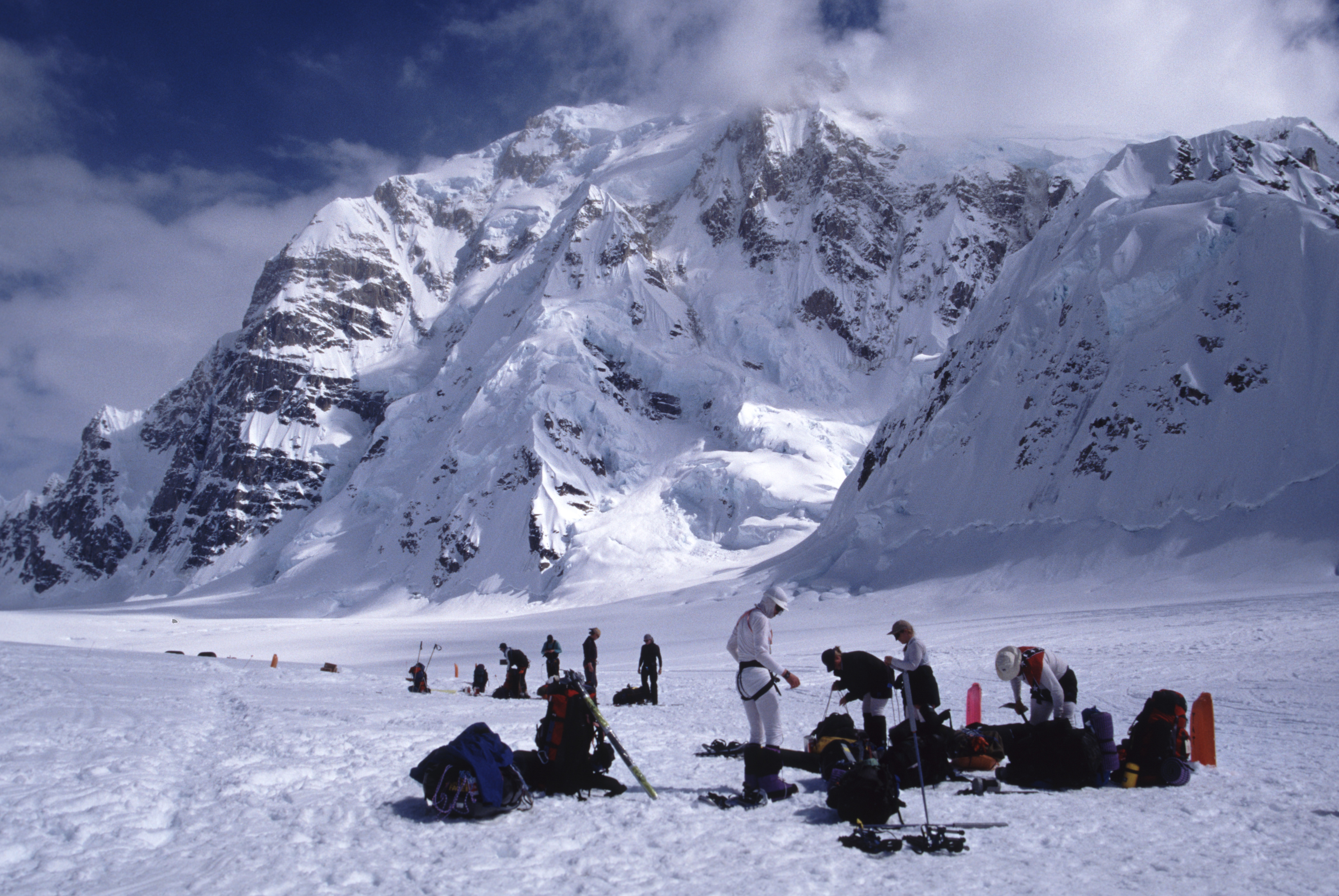
153. Mount Hunter is the third highest major summit of the Alaska Range.

== See also ==
- List of most prominent summits on Earth
- List of mountain peaks of North America
  - List of mountain peaks of Greenland
  - List of mountain peaks of Canada
  - List of mountain peaks of the Rocky Mountains
  - List of mountain peaks of the United States
    - List of the highest major summits of the United States
      - List of United States fourteeners
    - List of the most prominent summits of the United States
    - List of the most isolated major summits of the United States
    - List of mountain peaks of Alaska
    - List of mountain peaks of California
    - List of mountain peaks of Colorado
    - List of mountain peaks of Hawaii
  - List of mountain peaks of México
  - List of mountain peaks of Central America
  - List of mountain peaks of the Caribbean
- United States of America
  - Geography of the United States
  - Geology of the United States
    - Category:Mountains of the United States
      - commons:Category:Mountains of the United States
- Physical geography
  - Topography
    - Topographic elevation
    - Topographic prominence
    - Topographic isolation
