= Peak 8010 (Alaska) =

Summit in the Chugach Mountains, Alaska, United States

- Location within Alaska

Highest point
- Elevation: 8,010 ft (2,440 m)
- Prominence: 6,184 ft (1,885 m)
- Isolation: 3.58 mi (5.76 km)
- Coordinates: 61°09′38″N 144°48′47″W

Geography
- Location: Wrangell-St. Elias National Park and Preserve of Alaska, United States
- Parent range: Chugach Mountains

Climbing
- Easiest route: Climbing

Peak 8010 is a summit in the Chugach Mountains of Alaska, United States. The prominence is 6,110-foot (1,862 m) ranking it 58th on the list of prominent peaks in the United States. The peak is located in the Wrangell-St. Elias National Park and Preserve.

The peak is believed to have been first climbed in 2007 though other reports put it in 2020.

== See also ==
- List of mountain peaks of Alaska
  - List of the most prominent summits of Alaska
