= Gypsy Peak =

Mountain in Washington (state), United States

- Location within Washington (state)

Highest point
- Elevation: 7,320+ ft (2,230+ m)
- Prominence: 1,720 ft (520 m)
- Coordinates: 48°56′45″N 117°09′08″W

Geography
- Location: Pend Oreille County, Washington, U.S.
- Parent range: Selkirk Mountains
- Topo map: USGS Gypsy Peak

Gypsy Peak is a 7,320+ -foot (2,230+ m) high mountain in the Salmo-Priest Wilderness in the Selkirk Mountains of Pend Oreille County, Washington. It is the highest mountain in Eastern Washington.
