= Tyrolerfjord =

Fjord in Greenland

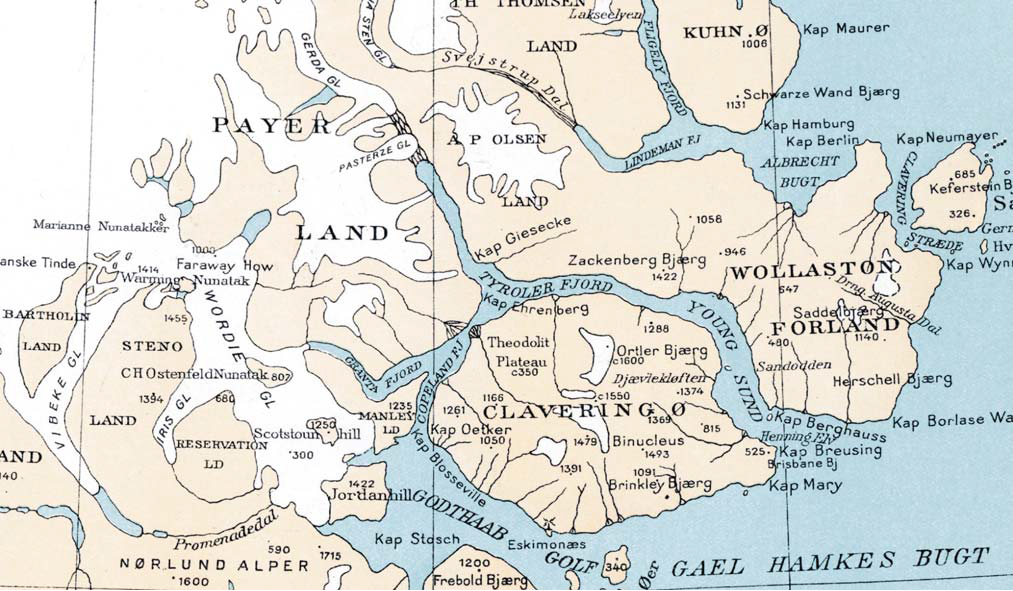
- Map section showing the Young Sound and Tyrolerfjord.

- Location in Greenland
- Location: Arctic
- Coordinates: 74°28′N 21°11′W
- Ocean/sea sources: Young Sound; Gael Hamke Bay; Greenland Sea
- Basin countries: Greenland
- Max. length: 55 kilometres (34 mi)
- Max. width: 4 kilometres (2.5 mi)
- Frozen: Most of the year

Tyrolerfjord is a fjord in King Christian X Land, East Greenland. Administratively it is part of the Northeast Greenland National Park zone.

== History ==
During the 1869–70 Second German North Polar Expedition of Carl Koldewey this body of water was surveyed by Julius Payer, who was impressed by the beauty of the Alpine-type mountain ranges surrounding the fjord and named it after the Tyrol historical region in the Alps.

Since the fjord forms a geographic whole with Young Sound, which had previously been named by William Scoresby, Koldewey used the name "Tyrolerfjord" —or "Tiroler Fjord" in the reports by Julius Payer— for the whole water body, all the way to its mouth in Gael Hamke Bay. Later, during the 1929–1930 Expedition to East Greenland, Lauge Koch reinstated the name "Young Sund" for the outer section of the water body.

There are a number of Norwegian and Danish hunting cabins in the shores of the fjord.

== Geography ==
Tyrolerfjord is a fjord that stretches deep inland west of Young Sound and north of Clavering Island, forming the northern shore of the island. To the north lies A. P. Olsen Land. It extends roughly from east to west for 30 kilometres (19 mi) and from southeast to northwest for 25 kilometres (16 mi) at the junction of a branch coming from the west and linking with Copeland Fjord. The Pasterze Glacier has its terminus on the western side of its northern end with a river draining it and flowing into the fjord. Further north flows the Gerda Glacier and Payer Land lies to the southwest of the whole area.

The western branch widens at the "Rudi Bay" section, becoming about 5 kilometres (3.1 mi) wide, wider than the average width of the fjord. After the junction it branches roughly southwards for about 7.5 kilometres (4.7 mi) until the northern end of a shallow area named Revet. The fjord is about 4 kilometres (2.5 mi) wide at the entrance and the part that stretches to the northwest narrows to about 1.5 kilometres (0.93 mi) all the way to its head.

Map of Northeastern Greenland

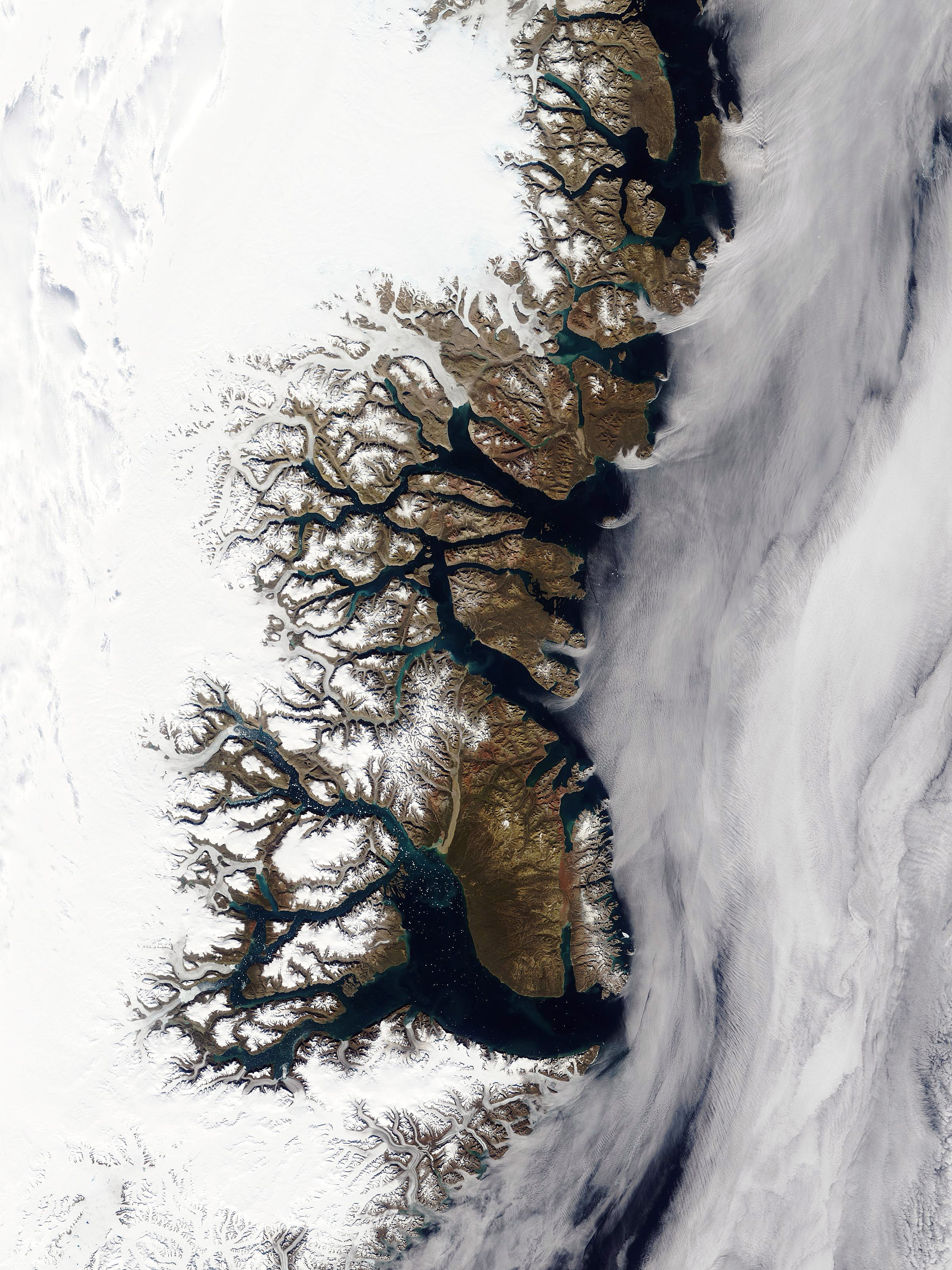
East Greenland Terra/MODIS satellite image

== See also ==
- List of fjords of Greenland
