= Wollaston Foreland =

Peninsula in Greenland

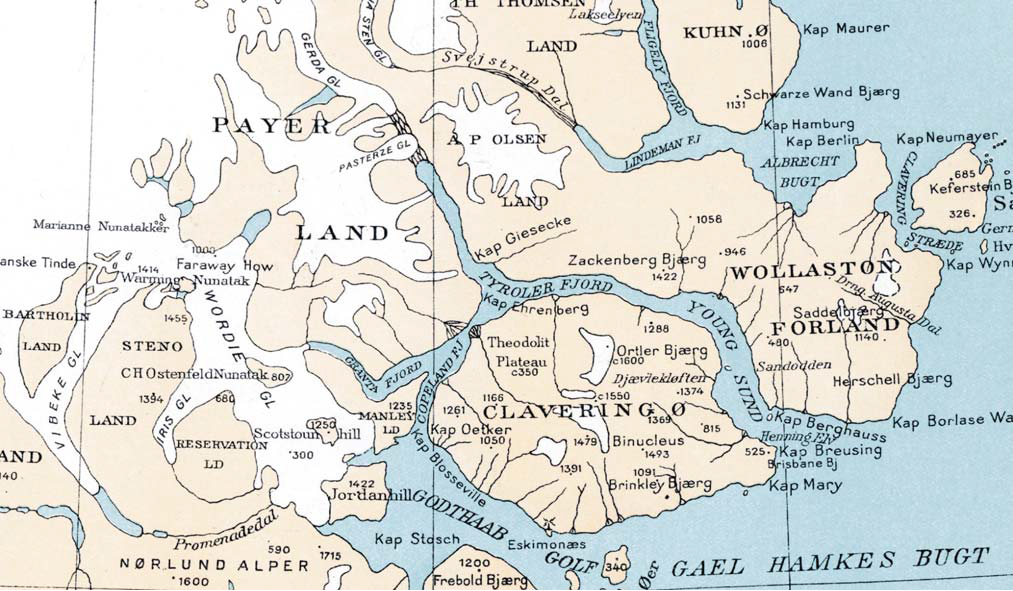
- Map of the area

- Location within Greenland

Geography
- Location: East Greenland
- Coordinates: 74°30′N 20°00′W
- Adjacent to: Lindeman Fjord; Albrecht Bay; Hochstetter Bay; Greenland Sea; Young Sound
- Length: 71 km (44.1 mi)
- Width: 35 km (21.7 mi)
- Highest elevation: 1,444 m (4738 ft)
- Highest point: Dombjerg

Administration
- Greenland (Denmark)
- Zone: NE Greenland National Park

Wollaston Foreland (Danish: Wollaston Forland) is a peninsula in King Christian X Land, East Greenland. Administratively it belongs to the NE Greenland National Park area.

== History ==
This peninsula was named by William Scoresby in 1822 as a testimony of respect to William Hyde Wollaston. It was also surveyed and explored by the Second German North Polar Expedition 1869–70 led by Carl Koldewey.

The Danish Sirius Dog Sled Patrol has its headquarters at Daneborg on the southeastern shore. The Zackenberg research station is situated further West, near Young Sound.

== Geography ==
Wollaston Foreland is bounded in the north by the Lindeman Fjord and Albrecht Bay of Hochstetter Bay, in the east by the Greenland Sea, in the south by the Young Sound and Gael Hamke Bay and in the west by A. P. Olsen Land. To the south and southwest across Young Sound lies large Clavering Island, close off northeast Sabine Island, and close off north Kuhn Island. Cape Wynn is the peninsula's easternmost point.

Wollaston Foreland is mountainous. Its highest point is the massive-looking 1444 m high Dombjerg, located in the western section near the isthmus. Other important mountains are Zackenberg, Kuplen, Nålene, Cardiocerasbjerg, Aucellabjerg, Murbjerg, Hühnerbjerg, Clark Bjerg and Herschell Bjerg.

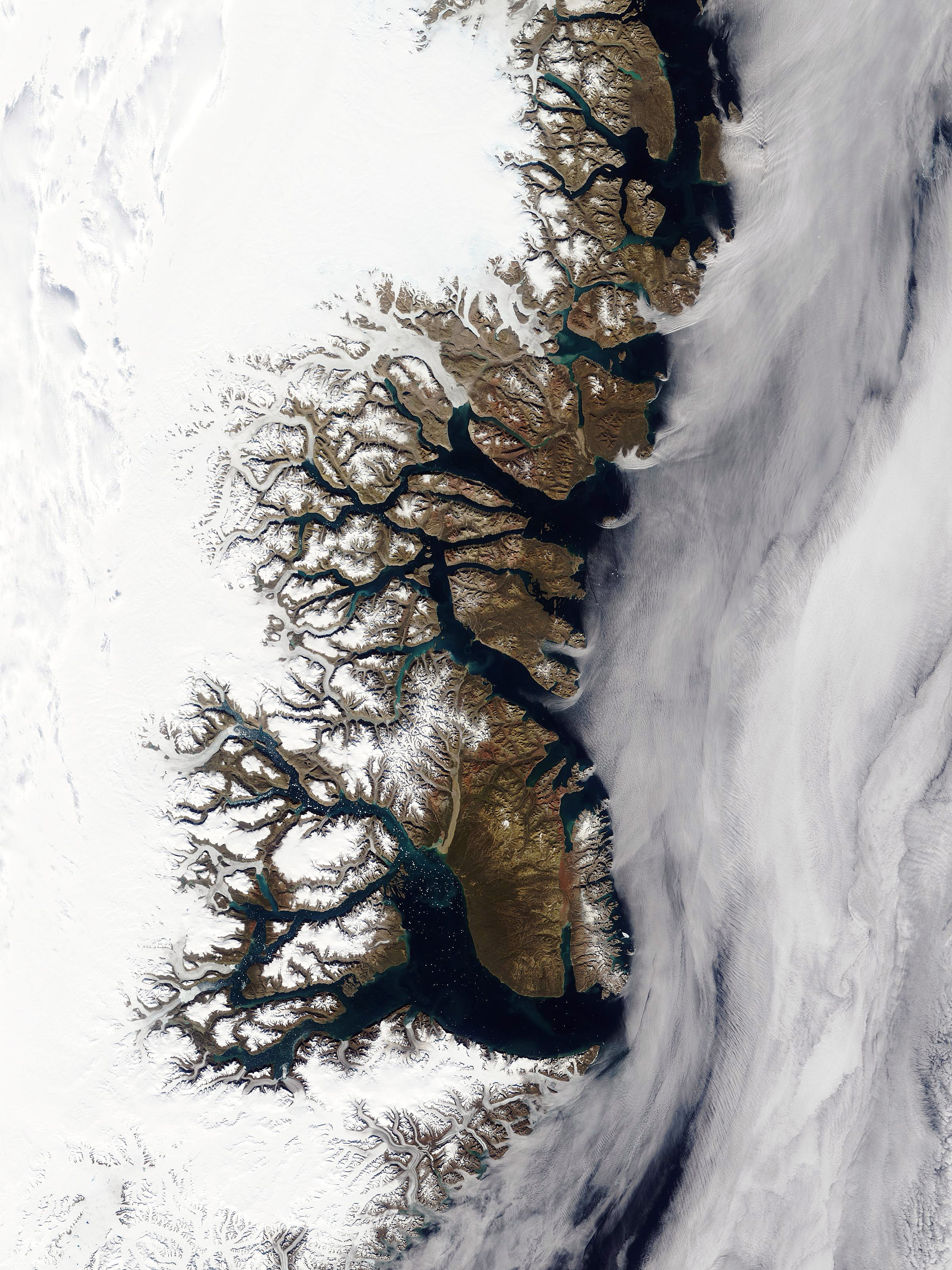
East Greenland Terra/MODIS satellite image

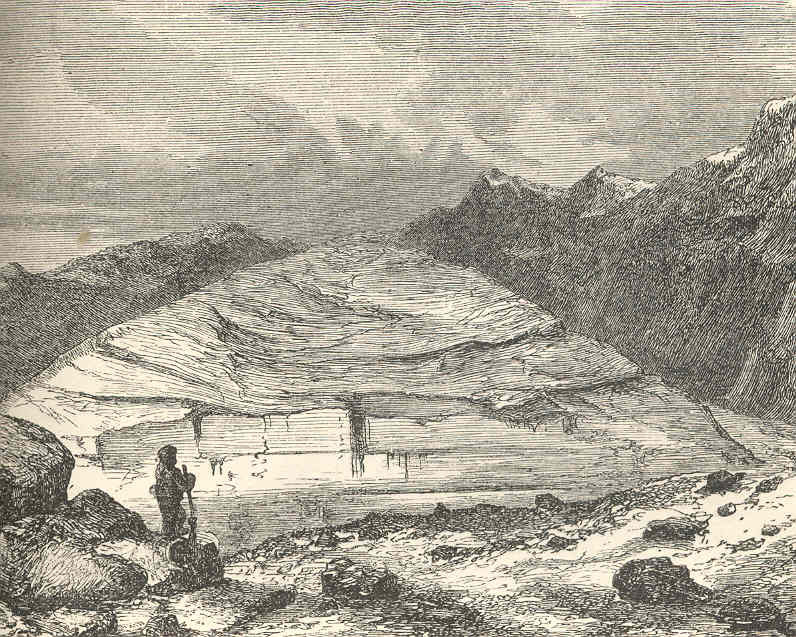
View of the Hühnerbjerg (German: Hühnerberg) glacier at the northeastern end.

== Bibliography ==
- Koldewey, Carl (1874) German Arctic Expedition of 1869-70, and Narrative of the Wreck of the 'Hansa' in the Ice, London: Sampson Low, Marston, Low, & Searle
