= Zackenberg Station =

Research station in Greenland

Coordinates: 74°28′11″N 20°34′25″W

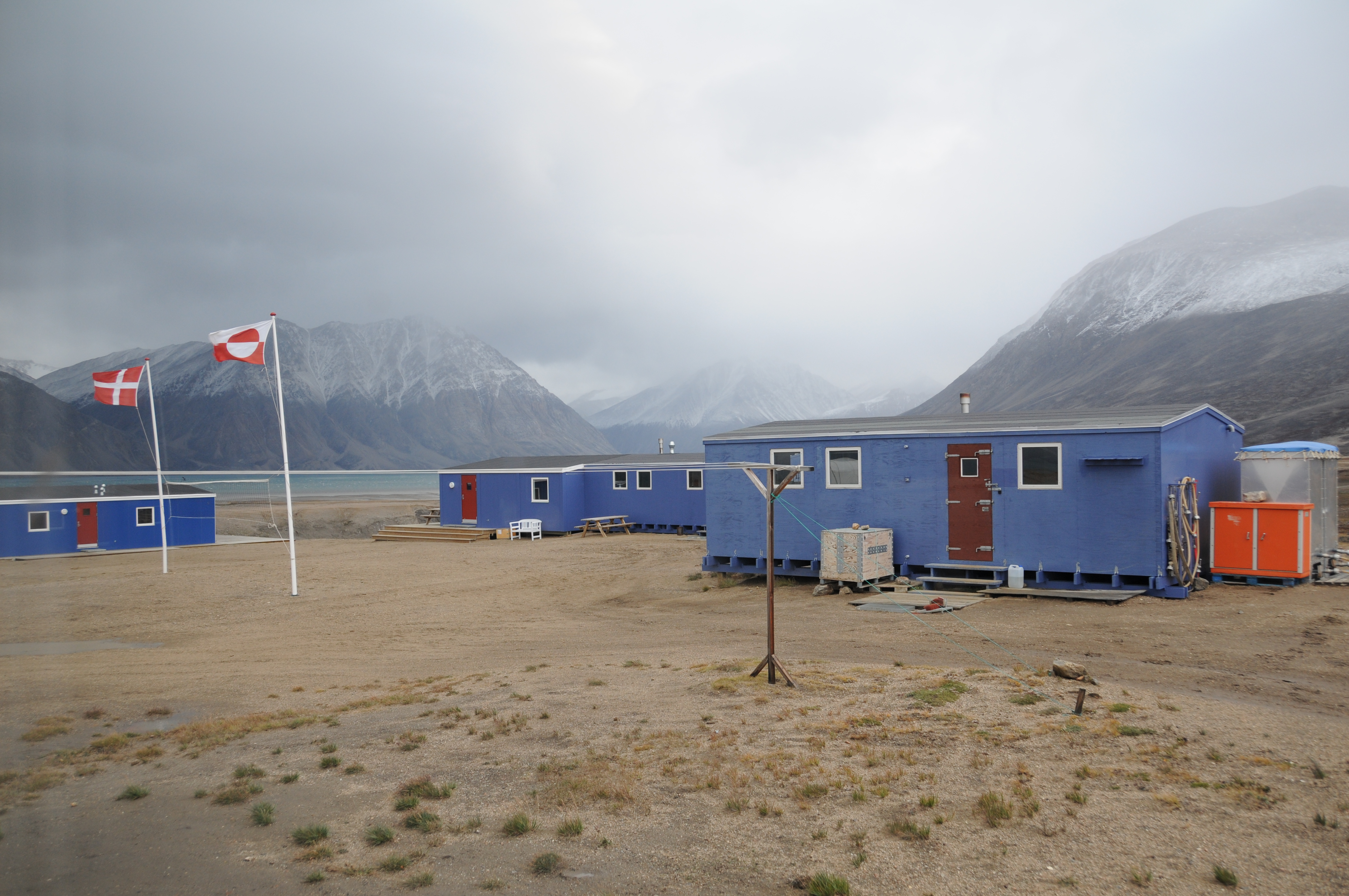
Zackenberg Research Station

Location of Zackenberg Station within Northeast Greenland National Park

Zackenberg (or ZERO - Zackenberg Ecological Research Operations), or Zackenberg Research Station, is an ecosystem research station and monitoring facility situated in the Northeast Greenland National Park in northeastern Greenland. The station is owned by the Greenland Self-Government and was run by the Danish Arctic Institute (Dansk Polarcenter) until 2008. In 2009 the running of the Station was transferred to the Dept of Arctic Environment at the Danish National Environmental Research Institute. The area is also known for some of the more classical work on plant and pollinator networks.

== Geography ==
Zackenberg Ecological Research Operations is named after the Zackenberg Mountain and lies in the eastern part of King Christian X Land about 2 km inland on the south coast of Wollaston Foreland peninsula at Young Sound in the Greenland Sea, roughly 450 km (280 mi) northwest of Ittoqqortoormiit. About 5 km (3.1 mi) southwest of the station lies the 911 meters (2,989 feet) high Mount Zackenberg. Daneborg station is about 25 km (16 mi) southeast of Zackenberg. Near the Zackenberg Station is the Zackenberg River, part of a fjord with outflow glaciers. The Freya Glacier is located on Clavering Island 10km southeast of the Zackenberg Research Station.

== Climate ==
Zackenberg Station is situated in a tundra climate (ET), with long, cold winters and short, cool summers. Despite its high humidity, precipitation is relatively low.

Climate data for Zackenberg Station (1995-2003 normals)
Month	Jan	Feb	Mar	Apr	May	Jun	Jul	Aug	Sep	Oct	Nov	Dec	Year
Record high °C (°F)	−2.9 (26.8)	−6.6 (20.1)	5.2 (41.4)	7.0 (44.6)	9.3 (48.7)	14.9 (58.8)	19.1 (66.4)	21.3 (70.3)	10.7 (51.3)	4.2 (39.6)	−3.1 (26.4)	6.8 (44.2)	21.3 (70.3)
Daily mean °C (°F)	−21.1 (−6.0)	−20.0 (−4.0)	−19.8 (−3.6)	−14.5 (5.9)	−5.5 (22.1)	1.9 (35.4)	5.5 (41.9)	4.8 (40.6)	−1.5 (29.3)	−10.1 (13.8)	−15.8 (3.6)	−19.2 (−2.6)	−9.6 (14.7)
Record low °C (°F)	−36.7 (−34.1)	−38.9 (−38.0)	−38.4 (−37.1)	−32.1 (−25.8)	−21.8 (−7.2)	−6.2 (20.8)	−2.6 (27.3)	−4.0 (24.8)	−13.0 (8.6)	−25.0 (−13.0)	−27.8 (−18.0)	−34.7 (−30.5)	−38.9 (−38.0)
Average precipitation mm (inches)	30.7 (1.21)	56.0 (2.20)	16.7 (0.66)	14.5 (0.57)	15.5 (0.61)	10.4 (0.41)	15.9 (0.63)	18.1 (0.71)	8.4 (0.33)	21.7 (0.85)	31.9 (1.26)	26.2 (1.03)	266 (10.47)
Average relative humidity (%) (daily average)	63.7	69.3	68.1	69.2	77.3	82.7	82.3	79.5	73.5	69.3	66.0	63.8	72.1
Source: Advances in Ecological Research

== Facilities ==
Zackenberg has 10 buildings holding scientific equipment and laboratories, living accommodations and a communication room. The station can host up to 20 persons at the same time with additional 10 persons at the branch facility at Daneborg. Zackenberg Station has normally been open for scientists from June to August but since 2007 the season has been extended from approximately May to October. Research takes place within the framework ZERO (Zackenberg Ecological Research Operations) dealing with issues concerning ecosystem science.

== History ==
A group of experienced scientists investigated various potential locations for a new research facility in Northeast Greenland in 1991 and concluded that the position near the Zackenberg Elv delta was optimal. The construction of the station was started in 1995 and the station was officially opened in August 1997.

== See also ==
- List of research stations in the Arctic
