= Halle Range =

Mountain range in Greenland

- Hallebjergene
- Map of Clavering Island (Eskimonaes) and neighbouring areas

Highest point
- Peak: Bramsen Bjerg
- Elevation: 1,272 m (4,173 ft)

Dimensions
- Length: 20 km (12 mi) NW/SE
- Width: 15 km (9.3 mi) NE/SW
- Area: 300 km^{2} (120 mi^{2})

Geography
- Location within Greenland
- Country: Greenland
- Range coordinates: 74°14′N 21°45′W

Geology
- Rock age: Upper Carboniferous

The Halle Range or Halle Mountains (Danish: Hallebjergene) is a mountain range in Clavering Island, King Christian X Land, northeastern Greenland. Administratively this range is part of the Northeast Greenland National Park zone.

The range was named by Lauge Koch during his 1929–30 expedition after Thore Gustav Halle (1884–1964), a professor at the Stockholm University who had worked on the plant samples brought by the expedition. Formerly it had been also known as Joh. H. Andresenfjellet.

== Geography ==
The Halle Range is an up to 1200 m high little glaciated mountain massif located in the southwest part of Clavering Island (Clavering Ø). Its average elevation is 912 m and the highest point of the range is 1272 m high Bramsen Bjerg. The Vildbækdalen is a valley in the heart of the range. The area of the Halle mountains is uninhabited.

Detailed map of the area around Clavering Island.

=== Mountains ===
- Bramsen Bjerg
- Brinkley Bjerg
- Dunken
- Eiger
- Forposten
- Gedderyggen
- Hjertet
- Højnålen
- Kisbjerg
- Langelinie
- Moltke Bjerg
- Monucleus
- Ortlerspids
- Pladen
- Skårene
- Steinmannspids
- Trinucleus
- Vestmar Bjerg
- Vesttinden
- Østtinden

== See also ==
- List of mountain ranges of Greenland
