= Greenland in World War II =

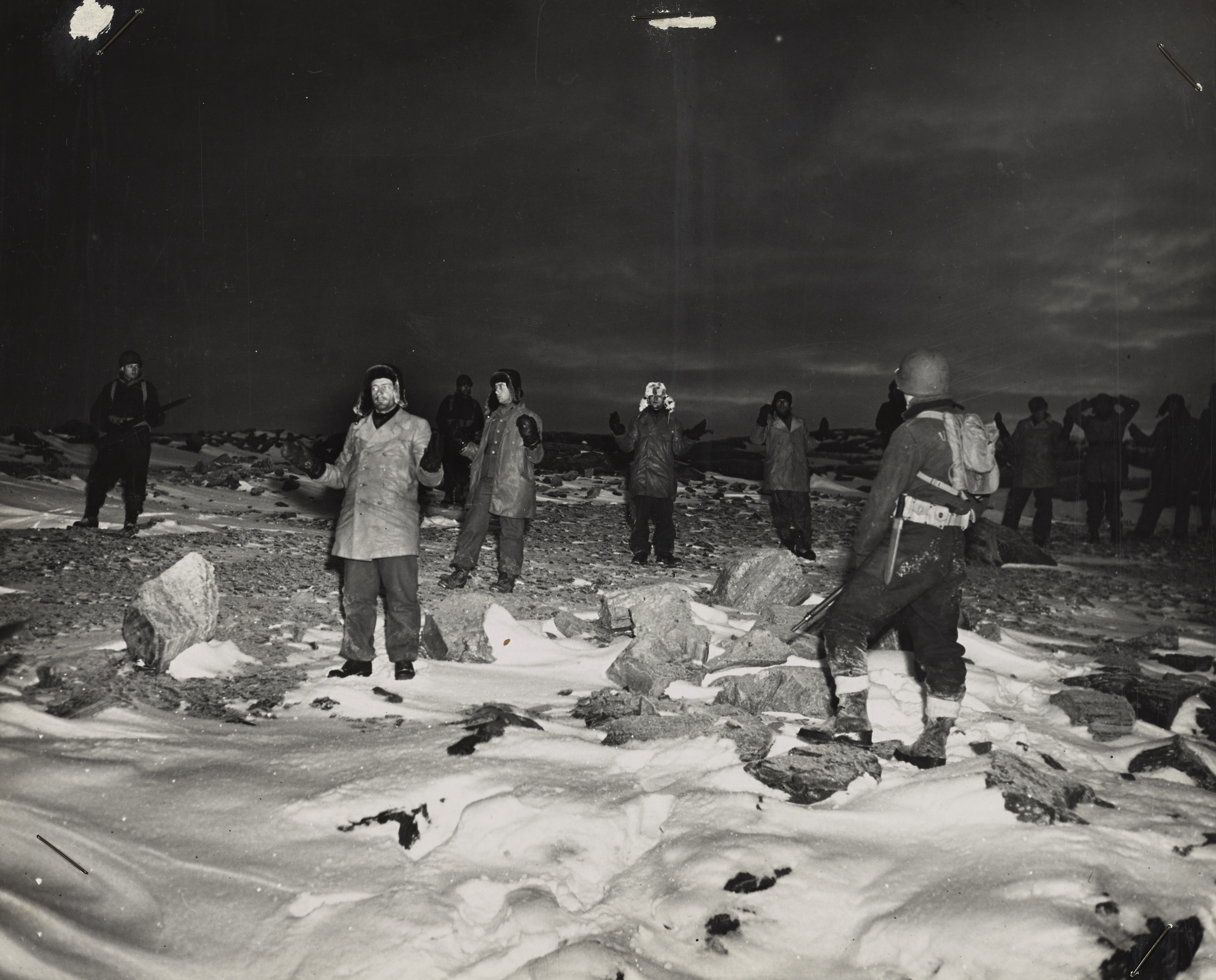
Members of the Edelweiss II weather station taken prisoner by American soldiers

The fall of Denmark in April 1940 left the Danish colony of Greenland an unoccupied territory of an occupied nation, under the possibility of seizure by the United Kingdom, United States or Canada, a Dominion of the British Empire.

From 1941 until 1945, the United States established numerous and extensive facilities for air and sea traffic in Greenland, as well as radio beacons, radio stations, weather stations, ports, depots, artillery posts, and search-and-rescue stations. The United States Coast Guard also provided a considerable portion of civilian resupply along both coasts.

Economically, Greenland traded successfully with the United States, Canada and Portugal, which, supplemented by the cryolite exports, caused a reanimation and permanent realignment of the island's economy.

== Neutrality ==
Before the war, Greenland was a tightly controlled colony of Denmark, otherwise closed off to the rest of the world. After the invasion of Denmark by Nazi Germany on 9 April 1940, Greenland was left on its own, because the United Kingdom's Royal Navy seized any ships arriving from Axis-controlled Europe. The British Empire initially laid plans to occupy points of interest on the island, but the United States, still neutral, firmly rejected "third party" intervention there.

The sheriffs (landsfogeder) of South and North Greenland, Eske Brun and Aksel Svane, invoking the emergency clause of a 1925 law specifying how Greenland was ruled, declared Greenland a self-ruling territory, believing this to be in the best interests of the colony as Denmark was occupied by Nazi Germany. This step was taken in coordination with the Danish ambassador to the United States, Henrik Kauffmann, and the U.S. State Department, and comported with the American declaration of 1920 that no third nation would necessarily be accepted as a sovereign in Greenland. This diplomatic stance was seen as an extension of the Monroe Doctrine.

Although the Danish government continued in power and still considered itself neutral, it was forced to obey German wishes in foreign policy matters. Kauffmann immediately recognized that his government was unable to exercise its full sovereignty, and therefore began to act in an independent capacity. On 13 April he took counsel with the Greenland sheriffs, and after some controversy they agreed to recognize him as their representative in the United States. Since the United States would not offer diplomatic recognition and aid to Greenland unless the local administration was independent, the sheriffs informed the local advisory parliament ("Landsraad") on 3 May that "there was no choice" but to act as a sovereign nation. The Danish Government continued to send orders to the colony via radio and through Portugal, but these messages were ignored. In this decision they were influenced by their determination to avoid becoming subject to a Canadian occupation and thus being drawn into the war.

The Greenlanders were also aware of the heavy Norwegian presence in Canada. In the event that the Dominion of Canada attempted to occupy the colony, they were worried that Free Norwegian Forces would be stationed in the area. This was a cause for concern, as the Norwegians had been vying for control over part of the territory until the Permanent Court of International Justice settled the dispute in 1933. Instead, they requested the protection of the United States, whose Treasury Department (then the home department of the U.S. Coast Guard) agreed to dispatch the vessels USCGC Comanche and USCGC Campbell with supplies and a consular team to establish a provisional consulate at Godthaab. Accepting the protection of the Americans, a third party, was seen as less of a threat to Greenland's sovereignty. Comanche arrived at Ivigtut on 20 May, and Godthaab on 22 May, thereby establishing direct diplomatic relations with Greenland. Canada sent a consul and vice-consul to Godthaab two weeks later.

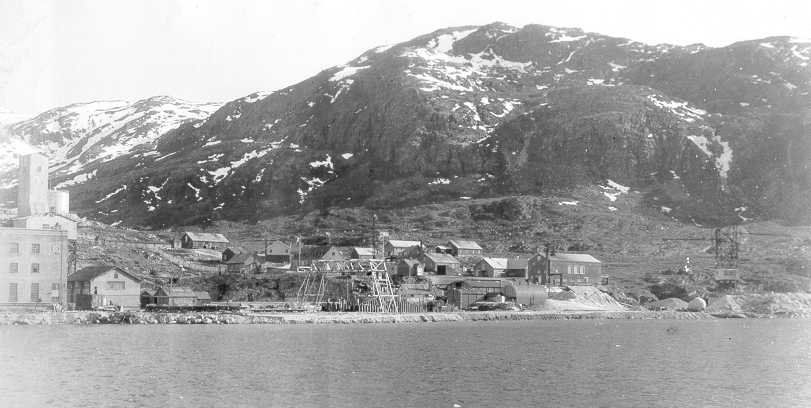
The Ivigtut cryolite mine in southwestern Greenland, 1940

In 1940, the chief concern of all interested parties was to secure the strategically important supply of cryolite from the mine at Ivigtut. Cryolite was a key component used in the production of aluminum. Due to diplomatic considerations, no American soldiers could be used to protect the mines, so the U.S. State Department recruited fifteen Coast Guardsmen who were voluntarily discharged and in turn hired by the mine as guards. Three-inch naval deck guns were supplied by Campbell and the recently arrived USCGC Northland along with eight machine guns, fifty rifles, and thousands of rounds of ammunition. In this way the United States maintained neutrality and still preempted British-Canadian plans for the island.

The Dane, Eske Brun, decided that Greenland should undertake its own measures to ensure its sovereignty. He made an appeal to the Greenland's guides and hunters to join an elite unit tasked with patrolling the most remote areas of the colony. Using the rifles left by the Americans, he directed the creation of what became the Sirius Dog Sled Patrol (Slædepatruljen Sirius). The 15 man volunteer team was made up of native Inuit, Danish colonists, and Norwegian expatriates.

Germany made no attempts to reach Greenland in 1940. However, three Norwegian vessels reached Norwegian stations on the East Coast. Two were intercepted by the Royal Navy, one (which was released) by the U.S. Coast Guard. In violation of Greenlandic neutrality, the Royal Navy demolished the Norwegian stations, drawing an American protest, and a German reconnaissance plane made a flight over the East Coast in November to check on a Norwegian station that had not been heard from.

In 1941, the situation shifted towards delivery of Lend-Lease aircraft to Britain via the North Atlantic island "stepping stones." Again, the British Empire with Britain and Canada pressed for an operation to establish an airfield near Cape Farewell. This led to an increased American presence to preserve the island's neutrality. Following surveys in 1940 and 1941, two locations for air bases were located, and a naval base established close to Ivigtut. The American bases and stations were codenamed under the Bluie West and Bluie East monikers.

President Franklin D. Roosevelt took a strong personal interest in Greenland's fate. On 9 April 1941, the anniversary of the German occupation, the Danish envoy Kauffmann, against the instructions of his government, signed an executive agreement with Secretary of State Cordell Hull, allowing the presence of American troops and making Greenland a protected state of the United States, which served British Empire interests very well. The cryolite mine in Ivigtut was a unique asset that made it possible for Greenland to manage fairly well economically during the war. The United States supplied the island and sent patrol boats to survey the east coast of Greenland although this activity was limited by seasonal ice. The Coast Guard, in coordination with Eske Brun, created the Northeast Greenland Sledge Patrol, consisting of 15 men, many of them former hunters in the area. Their task was to patrol the coast to discover any German activity.

However, in 1941 there was no such landing, although the Norwegian resupply trawler Buskø was encountered in September. Among its otherwise innocuous crew and passengers was a civilian Norwegian who intended to provide weather reports for German contacts in Norway. This ship was seized and brought to Boston by the Coast Guard. In 1941, Royal Navy ships continued to interfere with weather stations on the east coast. A couple of reconnaissance aircraft from Norway flew over Scoresbysund.

== Greenland enters the war ==
American servicemen in Greenland during World War II

When the United States entered the war against Germany on 11 December 1941, Greenland became a warring nation. Remaining contact with Copenhagen was broken off, rationing and daylight saving time were introduced, and local currency and stamps printed. In 1942, the U.S. Army took over protection of the Ivigtut mine, and combat patrols began to be flown from Bluie West One, which became the headquarters for both the Coast Guard Greenland Patrol and the United States Army Air Forces (USAAF) Greenland Base Command. A third air base was established at Bluie East Two during the summer.

The Greenland population, which had been 18,000 natives and fewer than 500 Danes, was augmented by thousands of U.S. servicemen. Relations with the Americans were excellent, as they provided news, provisions, humanitarian aid, and entertainment in addition to greatly expanding the island's infrastructure. In 1944 a five kroner coin was struck in Philadelphia, to be used by American soldiers. Greenland's commercial interests in North America were maintained by the Greenland Delegation with the aid of Kauffmann and Svane. Brun remained in Greenland as head of a unified administration.

=== German weather stations ===
Universal Newsreel about the 1944 attack on a German weather station

Both the Allies (Britain in particular) and Germany tried to gain a monopoly on weather data in the North Atlantic and Arctic Oceans. Meteorological intelligence was important as it affected military planning and the routing of ships and convoys. Greenland became an important part of this North Atlantic weather war.

Beginning in August 1942, the Germans established four clandestine weather stations on the east coast. The first expedition on Sabine Island was detected in the spring, but was withdrawn successfully before it was attacked. The fall 1943 expedition at Shannon Island also operated successfully over the winter and spring and was withdrawn by air. Two expeditions in October 1944 were seized by the Coast Guard before they could get established.

The German weather station Holzauge at Hansa Bay on the northeast coast of Sabine Island was discovered by a team from the Sledge Patrol on 11 March 1943. The Germans realized they had been discovered, and gave chase to the team, who had to abandon their equipment (including their dog teams) and retreat to the station at Eskimonæs, to warn Ib Poulsen, the Sledge Patrol commander. Poulsen reported the German base to the Greenland government on 13 March 1943, and asked for automatic weapons and further orders. Governor Brun officially designated the patrol the "Army of Greenland" and named Poulsen its captain, effective 15 March.

The Germans attacked Eskimonaes on 23 March, seized it and then burned the station two days later. Though unhurt in the firefight, the entire Sledge Patrol contingent based there was forced to make a 400-mile trek to the station at Ella Island without sleds, food, or equipment. On 26 March, while returning to Sabine Island, the Germans ambushed Corporal Eli Knudsen at Sandodden, and accidentally killed him with a machine-gun burst meant for his dogs. In late April, Lieutenant Hermann Ritter, the officer in command of the German detachment, was taken prisoner by Marius Jensen, a member of the Sledge Patrol, and brought to the Americans after a long journey to Scoresby Sound.

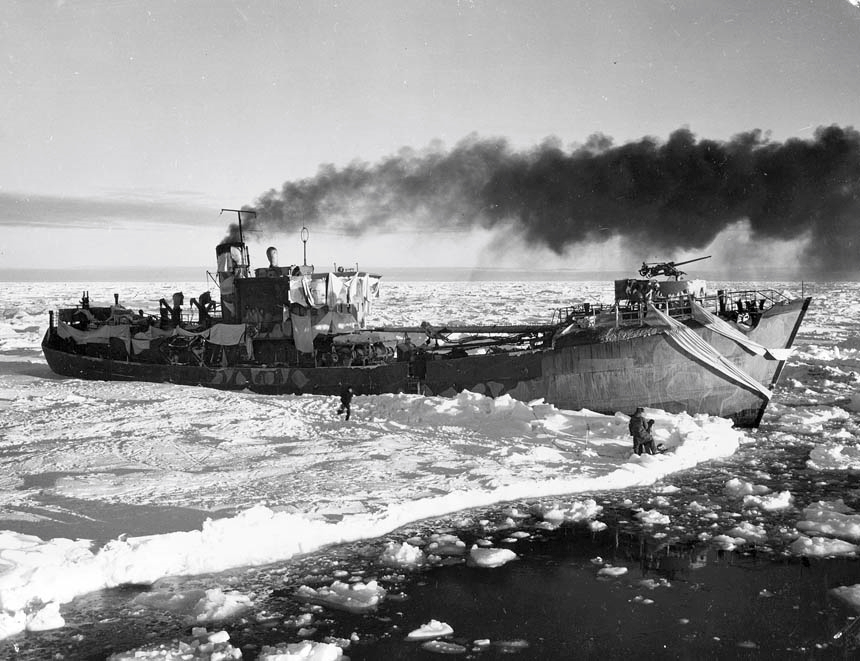
Externsteine shortly after its capture by the Eastwind

The German base on Sabine was bombed by USAAF bombers from Iceland. It was then seized by a Coast Guard landing party, but all German personnel save one person had already been evacuated by a Dornier Do 26. Apart from fire exchanged between German aircraft and American ships, this was the only offensive air attack on the Greenland mainland. An American air force formation attacked the station on 14 May to make sure it could be of no use to the Germans.

On 22 April 1944, six Sledge Patrol members attacked the Bassgeiger weather station and in the ensuing skirmish a German lieutenant died. The station was subsequently evacuated on 3 June.

The last German weather station, Edelweiss II, was captured by U.S. Army forces and its crew taken prisoner on 4 November 1944. The American troops landed from the icebreaker USCGC Eastwind, which later transferred the prisoners to USCGC Storis. The German transport ship Externsteine, which was resupplying the station, was seized by Eastwind, renamed Eastbreeze and commissioned in the United States Coast Guard.

Greenland played an important role in North Atlantic air traffic during the war, but the island's role as a major base for anti-submarine warfare assets was hampered by adverse weather, winter darkness, and difficult logistics. For a long period, a flight of six PBY Catalinas of VP-6(CG) was maintained at Bluie West One, carrying out a great variety of missions.

== Aftermath ==
On 5 May 1945, Greenlanders celebrated the liberation of Denmark in Nuuk. The Greenland Administration under Eske Brun surrendered its emergency powers and again came under direct control from Copenhagen. Kauffmann returned to Copenhagen, where treason charges against him were dropped, and the Danish parliament ratified his agreement with the United States. The United States presence continued in decreasing numbers until the Kauffmann-Hull agreement was replaced by a new base treaty in 1951. The American presence brought Sears catalogs, with which Greenlanders and Danes ordered modern appliances and other products by mail. The successful experience of an independent Greenland led to a dramatic restructuring and modernization of Danish policy with respect to the colony.

The Greenland Sledge Patrol suffered only one casualty during the war – Corporal Eli Knudsen in March 1943.

The remains of the police station in Eskimonæs exist to this day. The only fully remaining structure is the outhouse, as it was not burnt by the Germans. The rest is well-preserved in the arctic environment.

== In fiction ==
The film Vores mand i Amerika (The Good Traitor) covers the signing of the agreement over Greenland between Henrik Kauffmann and the United States.

A scene in the thriller The Manchurian Candidate includes an American veteran of the struggle against the German weather stations in Greenland giving a rather fanciful account of his experiences.

The novel Ice Brothers by former U.S. Coast Guard officer Sloan Wilson tells of the experiences of the crew and the hardships they faced aboard a small Coast Guard cutter that was part of the Greenland Patrol.

== See also ==
- Iceland in World War II
