= Young Sound =

Sound in Greenland

- Young Sund
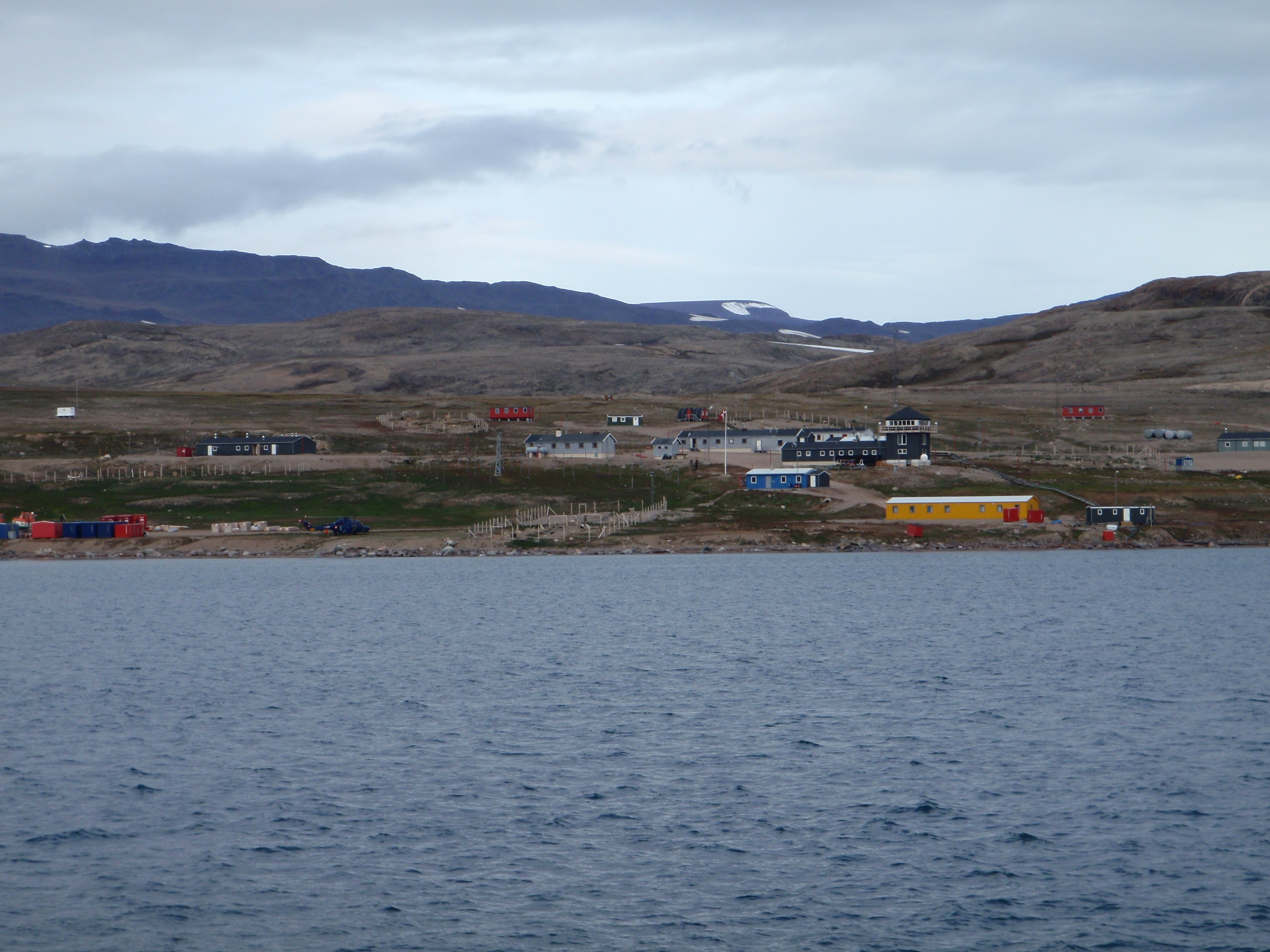
- View of Daneborg Station by the waters of Young Sound

- Location in Greenland
- Location: Arctic
- Coordinates: 74°23′N 20°24′W
- Ocean/sea sources: Gael Hamke Bay; Greenland Sea
- Basin countries: Greenland
- Max. length: 45 kilometres (28 mi)
- Max. width: 8 kilometres (5.0 mi)
- Frozen: Most of the year
- Settlements: Daneborg and Zackenberg stations

Young Sound (Danish: Young Sund) is a marine channel with a fjord structure in King Christian X Land, East Greenland. Administratively it is part of the Northeast Greenland National Park zone.

== History ==
The fjord was given the name "Young’s Bay" by William Scoresby in 1822. He named it in honour of British scientist Thomas Young (1773– 1829), secretary of the Board of Longitude. During the 1869–70 Second German North Polar Expedition this body of water was surveyed by Carl Koldewey, who used the name "Tyrolerfjord" for the whole water body. Later, during the 1929–1930 Expedition to East Greenland, Lauge Koch reinstated the name "Young Sund" for the outer section of the water body.

Just north of Daneborg there was a Danish hunting station named Sandodden which is now abandoned.

== Geography ==
Young Sound opens in the northern side of the mouth area of Gael Hamke Bay, north of Cape Breusing. It extends north and northeast of Clavering Island and southwest of Wollaston Foreland; to the north lies A. P. Olsen Land. It is about 8 kilometres (5.0 mi) wide at the entrance and stretches to the west for about 10 kilometres (6.2 mi), curving inward in a roughly northwestern direction for 15 kilometres (9.3 mi), bending again roughly westwards for a further 10 kilometres (6.2 mi) until the mouth of the Tyrolerfjord, that branches northwards and forms the inner section of the water body.

Zackenberg Station and Daneborg Station are located on the Wollaston Foreland shore of the sound, the latter close to its mouth. Basalt Island, also known as "Klippe", is a small island in the middle of Young Sound, about 11 kilometres (6.8 mi) NW of its entrance.Sandøen, a small sandy islet with a walrus colony, is located in the mouth area.

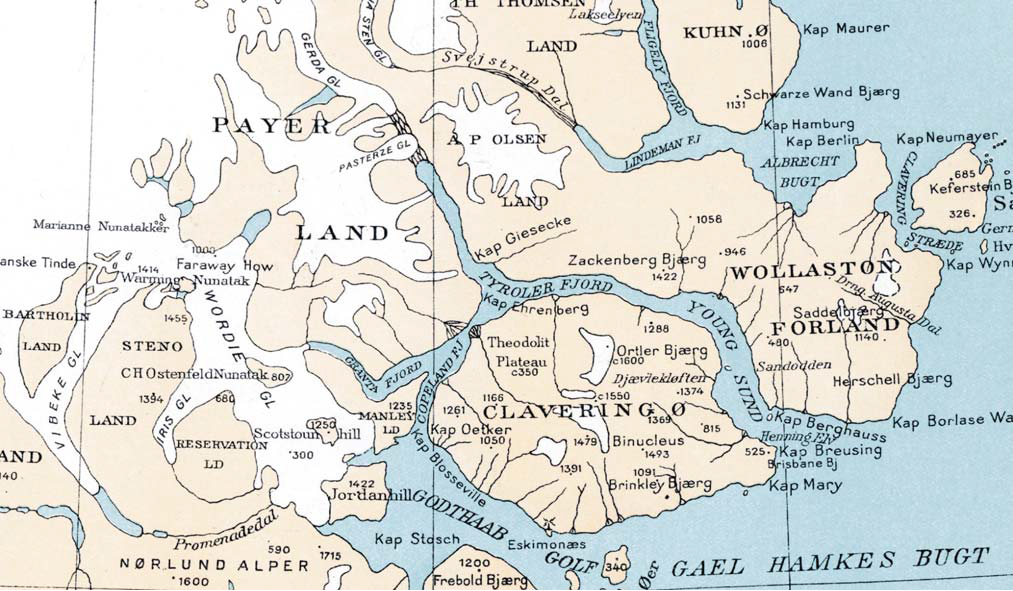
Map section showing the Young Sound area.

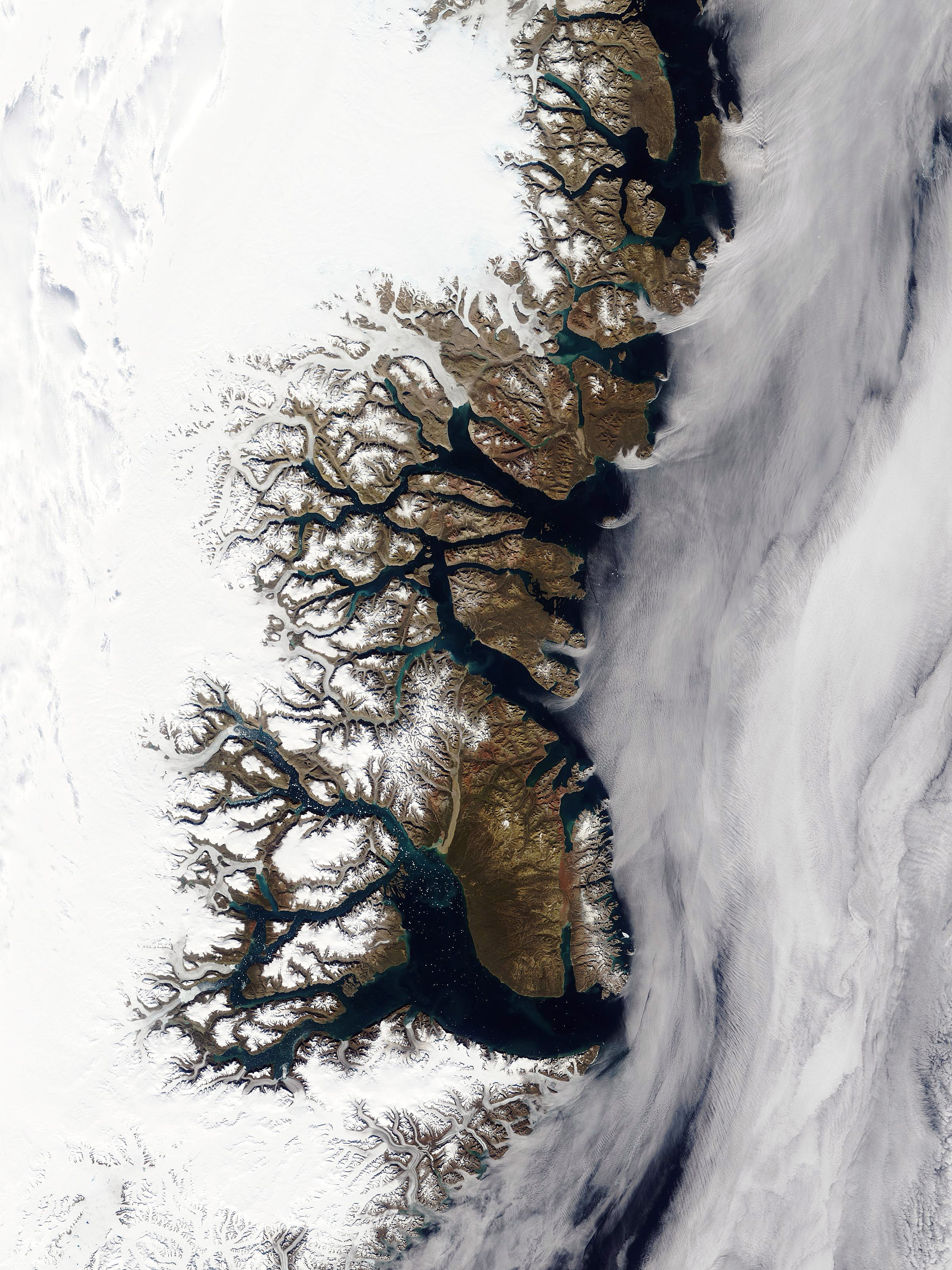
East Greenland Terra/MODIS satellite image

== See also ==
- List of fjords of Greenland
