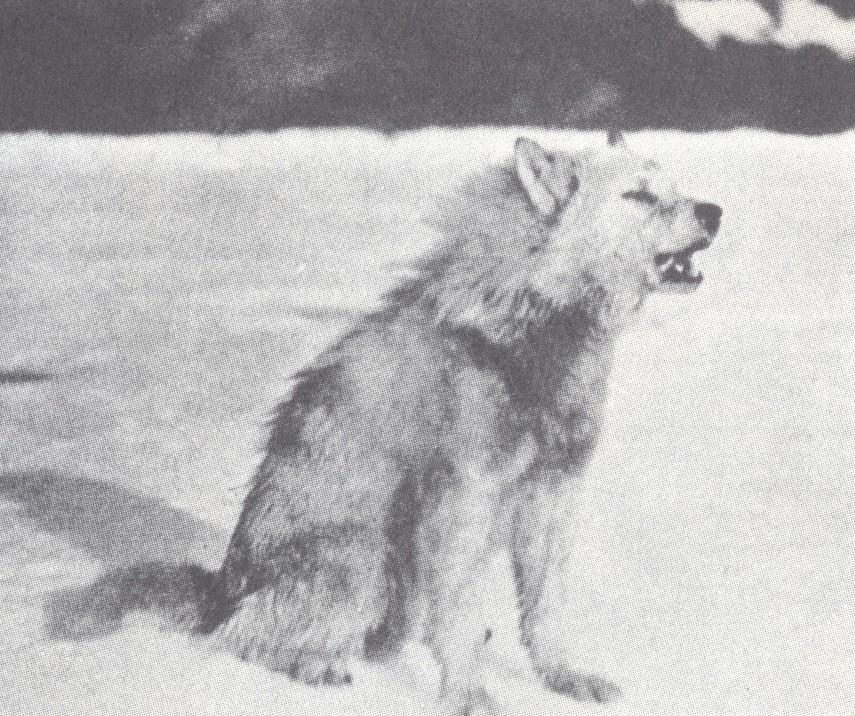

Scientific classification
- Kingdom: Animalia
- Phylum: Chordata
- Class: Mammalia
- Order: Carnivora
- Family: Canidae
- Genus: Canis
- Species: C. lupus
- Subspecies: C. l. orion

Trinomial name
- Canis lupus orion Pocock, 1935
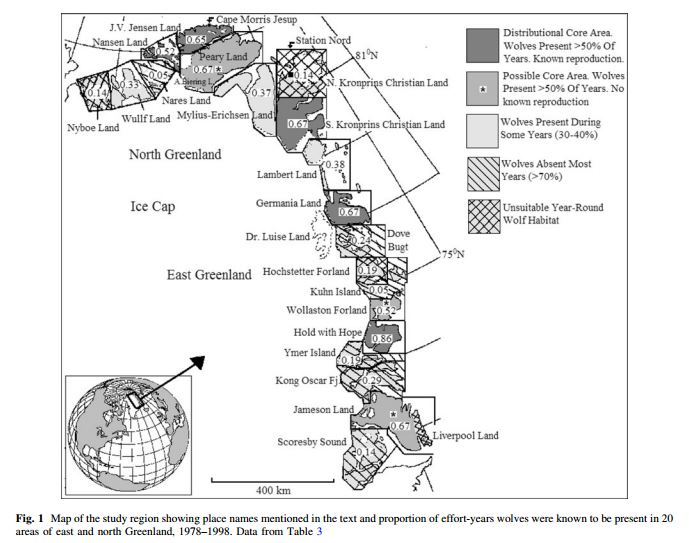
- C. l. orion range

Synonyms
- Canis albus orion

= Greenland wolf =

Subspecies of the gray wolf

The Greenland wolf (taxonomic Latin: Canis lupus orion, Danish: grønlandsulv) is a subspecies of gray wolf that is native to Greenland and Ellesmere Island, Canada. Historically it was heavily persecuted, but today it is generally protected. Approximately 90% of the wolf's range falls within the boundaries of the Northeast Greenland National Park. During most years, the population residing in Greenland is estimated to be between 30 and 40 wolves.

== Taxonomy and evolution ==
In 1935, the British zoologist Reginald Pocock attributed the subspecies name Canis lupus orion to a specimen from Cape York, northwest Greenland. He also attributed the name Canis lupus arctos (Arctic wolf) to a specimen from Melville Island in the nearby Queen Elizabeth Islands, Canada. Both wolves are recognized as separate subspecies of Canis lupus in the taxonomic authority Mammal Species of the World in 2005.

The oldest wolf remains in Greenland date to 7,600 years ago; however, they may have been there earlier because their main prey, the caribou, date to 8,900 years ago. Nowak proposed that during the Late Pleistocene two types of wolves evolved in the ice-free north of the Wisconsin glaciation, one in the Peary Land refugium in the far north of Greenland, the other in Alaska. Once the ice receded, the Peary Land wolves spread across Greenland and the Queen Elizabeth Islands. The Alaskan wolves spread to become the northern wolves referred to as Canis lupus arctos. Other wolves from south of the ice sheet would move north to interact with the northern wolves. Other authors have disagreed that the Greenland wolf is a separate subspecies of Canis lupus because of its close proximity to the range of the Arctic wolf. One author proposed that the Greenland wolf migrated from Canada by crossing the frozen sea ice between the two regions, and another has documented wolves on the ice when the Nares Strait froze.

In 2016, a study based on 582 base pairs of mitochondrial DNA indicated that Greenland wolves belong to one haplotype that had been previously found among other North American wolves, which indicates their female lineage originated from North America. In 2019, a study mapped the entire mitochondrial genome of the Greenland wolf and confirmed that it fell within Canis lupus.

In 2018, a whole genome study of most North American wolf populations identified three distinct populations in the high arctic, including one novel and highly distinct wolf population that inhabits both Ellesmere Island, Canada and Greenland. This had already been suggested in a morphological review in 1983, where wolves of the Queen Elizabeth Islands (the main island is Ellesmere) were placed in C. l. orion together with wolves of Greenland.

In 2021, the entire genome sequence of the Greenland wolf was mapped to aid further research.

== Description ==
The Greenland wolf has been described as being small to medium in length, at 155 cm (5 ft 1 in) but extremely light in weight, at 26 kg (57 lb); however, these measures were derived from only five specimens that were caught in northeast Greenland during the winter of 1906 and could be the result of under-nutrition. The average pack size of the wolves is 3.3; packs of four or more were rare. They are endangered due to their exceptionally low densities, smaller pack sizes, infrequent reproduction, and lower offspring production. The wolves of Greenland and Ellesmere Island prey on any easily obtainable species, with hare forming an important food source. The wolf has been documented preying on seal in both Greenland and the Queen Elizabeth Islands, and there are documented eye-witness accounts of muskox killings from the Queen Elizabeth islands and from Greenland where two muskox calves were killed by a wolf pair.

== Population ==
Wolves were fully protected in Greenland from 1988 to 2020, with an exception for Ittoqqortoormiit. Since 2020, while wolves in Greenland remain generally protected, licensed hunters from Qaanaaq and Ittoqqortoormiit are permitted to hunt wolves year-round under a quota system set by the government. In Greenland, about 90% of the wolf's range falls within the boundaries of the Northeast Greenland National Park, where the wolf population was estimated in 1998 to be 55 wolves due to lack of prey. However, in 1997, there was a decline in the wolf populations and their prey, muskoxen (Ovibos moschatus) and Arctic hares (Lepus arcticus) across Arctic Canada. This was due to harmful weather conditions during the summers for four years. The recovery of the Canadian wolf populations came after when summer weather conditions returned to normal. By 2002, the total wolf population in Greenland plummeted to an estimated 32 wolves remaining in northern Greenland, causing a 41.8% reduction of the total wolf population in Greenland and a 51.2% reduction in range. In 2018, it was estimated that the total population of the Greenland wolf was about 200, but with significant uncertainty due to its remote range. Since the late 2010s, wolf sightings in northwestern Greenland have been increasing, leading to wolves entering settlements more frequently and causing conflict with residents and sled dogs. As expected from such a tiny population, genetics have shown that the Greenland wolf is quite inbred.

=== In east Greenland ===
In eastern Greenland between by 1899 and 1939, a small population of an estimated 38 wolves were poisoned to extinction.

The Greenland wolf population was not harvested by the Europeans prior to 1899. The decline and extermination of the wolf population was studied in east Greenland between 1899 and 1939. There the wolf population was located mainly in the central part of the range, which made them vulnerable to Danish and Norwegian hunters who exterminated that population with poison. Arctic wolves were considered lesser in terms of economic value by the hunters because of their low abundance, with the hunters trapping Arctic foxes for the fur trade. They sought to maximize profits by killing as many wolves as possible. Between 1899 and 1939, there were 252 sightings of the wolves or their tracks. Of 112 wolves that were sighted in the early winter, 31.3% were lone wolves, 23.2% were in pairs, and the rest stayed together in larger groups. Between 1920 and 1932, 35 wolves were killed in the core wolf range, forcing the population to decline rapidly to extinction.

Wolves could not recover during the years between 1939 and 1978 in east Greenland due to factors such as geography and limited resources. Prey was insufficient and a dispersal corridor was hidden at 79 degrees north, thus restricting access to east Greenland. In 1979, a wolf pair had arrived into the historical wolf range and during 1980 several wolf pairs were reported throughout eastern Greenland by military patrols. The migrating wolves began to repopulate the area and had established a new population of wolves. By 1996, they had re-established a population of 23 wolves through single and pairs of wolves following military dog-sled patrols from the north over distances of up to 560 km (350 mi) to eastern Greenland.

After 1996, sightings of wolves in north-east Greenland sharply decreased until they dropped to zero by 2002, followed by the population being declared regionally extinct.

In 2021, it was reported that "In north Greenland, a small population of up to 32 wolves during optimal years continues to exist, and dispersers reach north-east Greenland occasionally."
