= Gael Hamke Bay =

Bay in Greenland

- Gael Hamkes Bugt
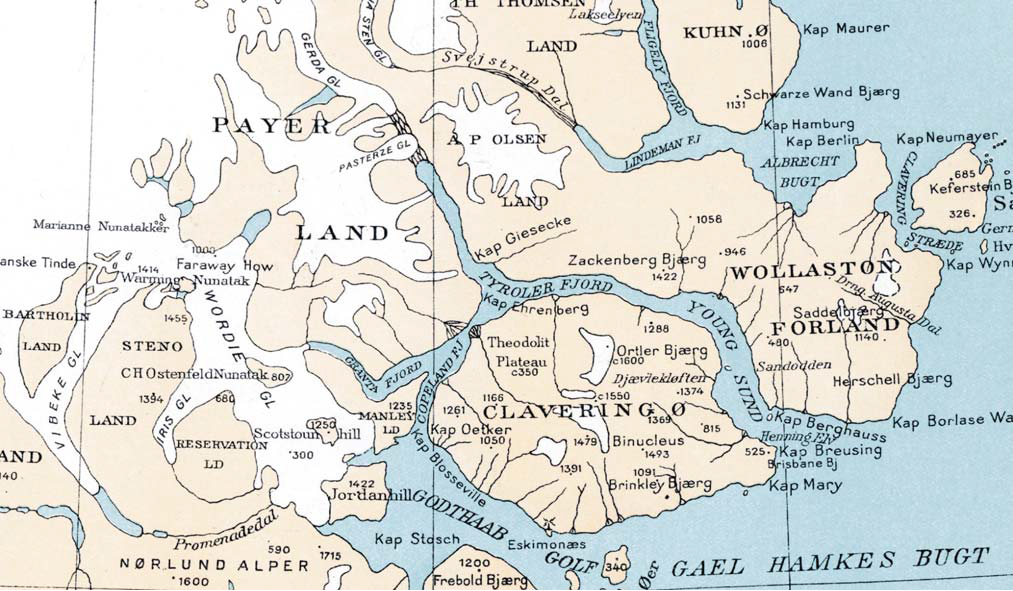
- Map section with the bay in the lower right corner.

- Location in Greenland
- Location: Arctic
- Coordinates: 74°00′N 20°30′W
- Ocean/sea sources: Greenland Sea
- Basin countries: Greenland
- Settlements: Eskimonaes and Dødemandsbugten (abandoned)

Gael Hamke Bay (Danish: Gael Hamkes Bugt) is a large bay in King Christian X Land, East Greenland. Administratively it is part of the Northeast Greenland National Park zone.

The bay was named after a Dutch skipper that claimed to have discovered the bay in 1654.

== Geography ==
The bay lies south of Wollaston Foreland, north of Home Foreland, and east of Clavering Island. Towards the west lie the Finsch Islands, where the bay narrows and becomes the Godthåb Gulf. The Young Sound has its mouth in the north, between the eastern end of Clavering Island and the southern shore of Wollaston Foreland. Jackson Island lies to the southeast at the mouth of the bay.

Map of Northeastern Greenland

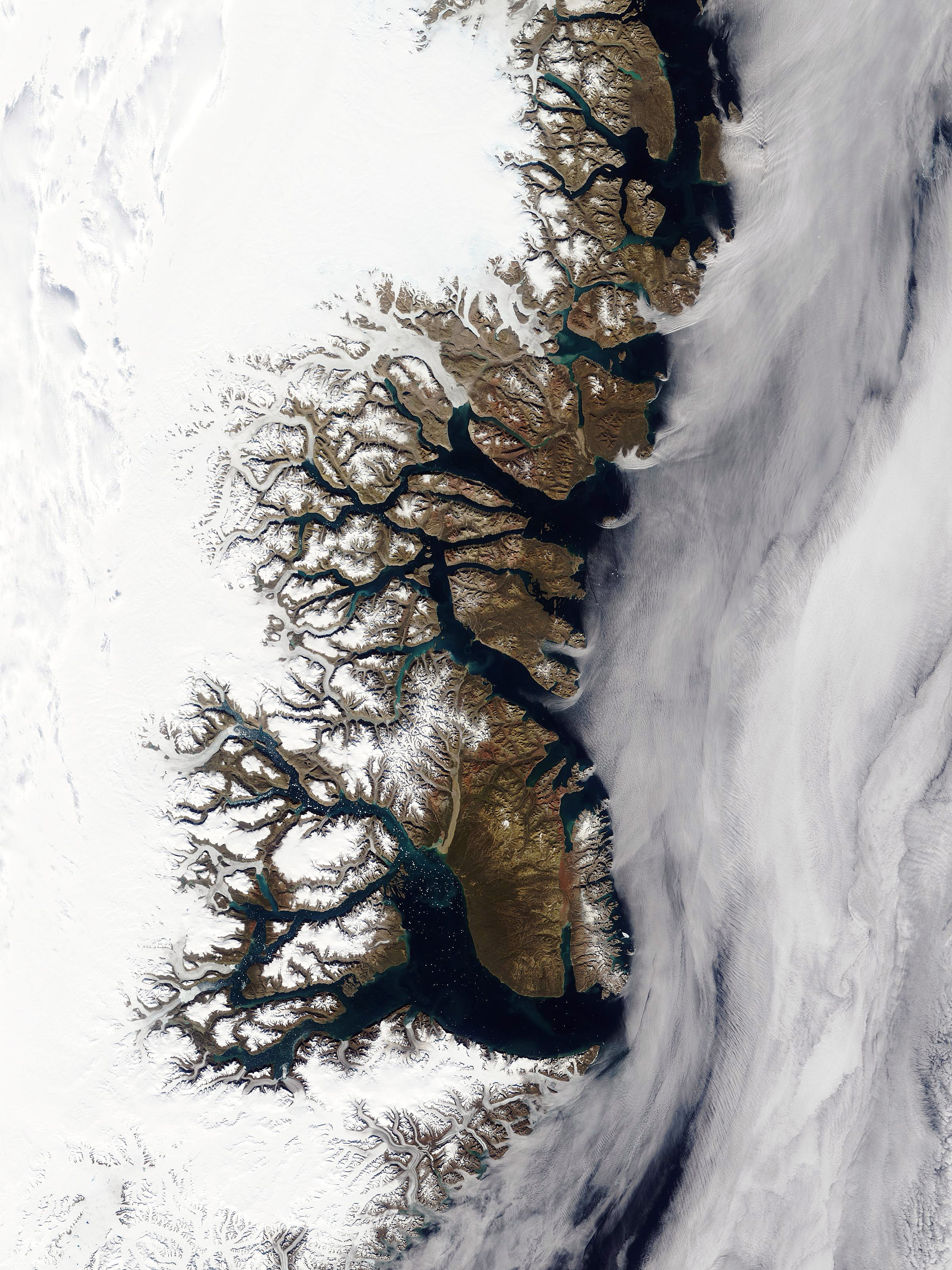
East Greenland Terra/MODIS satellite image
