= Zackenberg =

Mountain in Wollaston Foreland, Greenland

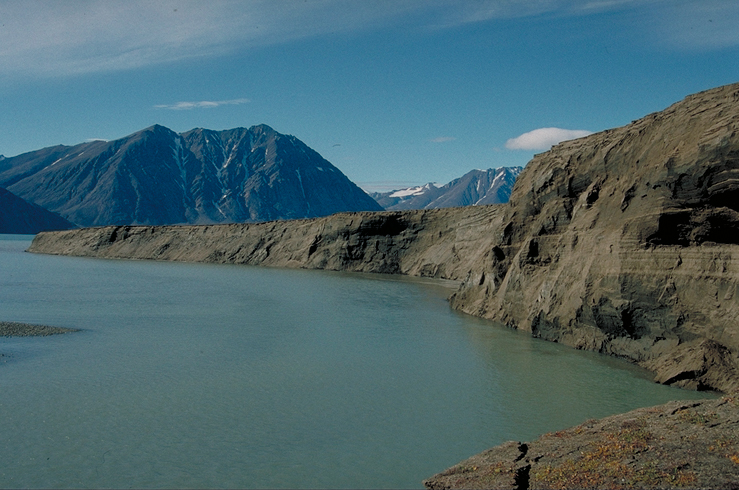
- The Zackenberg viewed from the east near the river's mouth.

Highest point
- Elevation: 1,302.7 m (4,274 ft)
- Coordinates: 74°29′44″N 20°45′59″W

Geography
- Location within Greenland
- Location: Northeast Greenland National Park, Greenland

Zackenberg or Zackenburg is a mountain in Wollaston Foreland, NE Greenland.

== Geography ==
This dark-hued mountain is located at the southern end of the western section of the Wollaston Foreland. Zackenberg rises steeply from the shore of the Zackenberg Bay on the northern side the Young Sound (Danish: Young Sund). It is a 1,375 metres (4,511 ft) high massive mountain with a number of peaks, hence its German name 'Zackenberg', referring to its serrated top. A river flows on its northern and eastern side forming a valley between this mountain and the higher Dombjerg to the north.

The Zackenberg Station, a research facility, is built at the foot of the mountain.

== See also ==
- List of mountain peaks of Greenland
