= Holzauge =

Wehrmacht weather station

Holzauge ([ˈhɔlt͡sˌʔaʊ̯ɡə], "wooden eye", nickname for a spotter) was a Wehrmacht weather station that was built by Nazi Germany after the occupation of Denmark during World War II. It was located on the island of Greenland, which is currently an autonomous territory within the Danish Realm.

== Timeline ==
In 1941, the Nordøstgrønlands Slædepatrulje was established by the Danish governors in Greenland, in agreement with the Americans, in order to monitor possible German activities in Northeast Greenland. The patrol consisted of Danish police officers assisted by Danish, Greenlandic and Norwegian fur trappers. Most of them had lived in Northeast Greenland for years and knew the inhospitable area well.

On 22 August 1942, the fishing steamer Sachsen, which had been converted into a weather observation ship, landed in East Greenland. The ship had set out from Tromsø with a Wehrmacht unit under the command of Lieutenant Hermann Ritter and a group of meteorologists led by Gottfried Weiss, totalling 17 men. Weiss had identified the area as an ideal location for a weather station on a reconnaissance flight a month earlier.

On site, Ritter then chose Hansa Bay on Sabine Island as a wintering place. The group reported their weather observations to Germany and managed to remain undetected until 11 March 1943.

On 13 March 1943, a gun battle occurred when the Germans were accidentally spotted by members of Nordøstgrønlands Slædepatrulje, during which Danish corporal (non-commissioned officer) Eli Knudsen was fatally wounded. Two members of the patrol were captured.

On 17 March, the Sachsen sank.

On 25 March, the headquarters of the Eskimonæs sledge patrol near the southern tip of Clavering Island, about 95 kilometres (59 miles) southwest, was partially destroyed by the Germans. Later, the two captured patrol members managed to escape, bringing Lieutenant Ritter with them as a prisoner. Lieutenant Ritter spent the remainder of the war as an American prisoner of war.

The remaining members of the patrol retreated to Scoresbysund and reported the location of the German weather station. On 25 May it was attacked and almost completely destroyed by four U.S. Army Air Forces bombers stationed in Iceland. The remaining Germans were evacuated on 6 and 17 June.

== See also ==
- North Atlantic weather war

== Bibliography ==
- Wilhelm Dege, William Barr: War North of 80 – The Last German Arctic Weather Station of World War II. University of Calgary Press, 2003, ISBN 1-55238-110-2.
- Anders Odsbjerg: Nordøstgrønlands slædepatrulje 1941–1945. Komma-Verlag, Kopenhagen 1990, ISBN 87-7512-442-4 (Danish).
- Gottfried Weiß: Das arktische Jahr. Eine Überwinterung in Nordostgrönland. Westermann, Braunschweig u. a. 1949 (2. Auflage. Haag und Herchen, Frankfurt am Main 1991, ISBN 3-89228-535-7) (German).
- Jens Fog Jensen, Tilo Krause: Wehrmacht occupations in the new world: archaeological and historical investigations in Northeast Greenland. (PDF; 1.97 MB). In: Polar Record 48, 2012, p. 269–279 doi:10.1017/S0032247411000180
