= Mestersvig =

- Military outpost
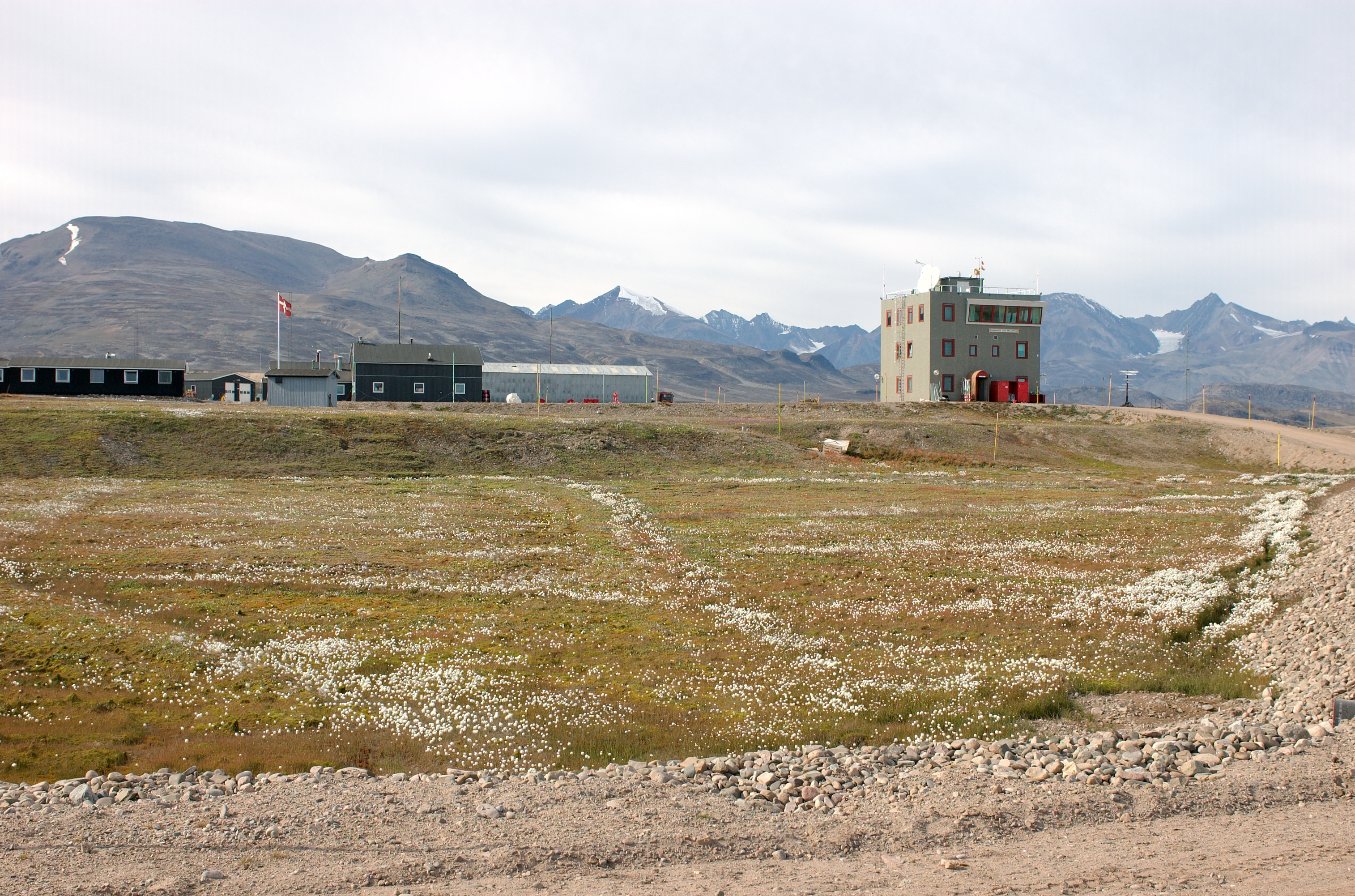
- The outpost seen from the runway

- Location within Greenland
- Coordinates: 72°14′0″N 23°55′0″W

Mestersvig, also called Mesters Vig, is a military outpost located in Scoresby Land, on the southwestern shore of Davy Sound in King Christian X Land, NE Greenland. It has a 1,800 m gravel airstrip (ICAO: BGMV). The area was previously home to a zinc and lead mine, in the early 21st century mining resumed for molybdenum. The military base is used by the Sirius Dog Sled Patrol.

== History ==
This site is located near the Stauning Alps mountainous area and, since 1974, has been on the southern shore of the Northeast Greenland National Park.

From 1956 to 1962, Blyklippen near to Mestersvig was a zinc and lead mine, it closed due to comparatively low metal prices. During this period the mine produced 545,000 long tons (554,000 t) of ore at 9.3% lead and 9.9% zinc concentrations. The mine camp and harbour remains on site. By the early 2000s mining has resumed for molybdenum by Greenland Resources Incorporated. Conico investigated the site in 2022 as a potential source for copper, nickel, cobalt, zinc, lead, gold and palladium. Conico holds mineral rights to 1,447 square kilometres (559 sq mi) and in 2023 announced it had found concentrations of lead and zinc but not commercially viable at the metal prices prevalent at the time.

Early in the morning on 11 September 2023 the Aurora Expeditions cruise vessel Ocean Explorer ran aground near to the site.

== Military use ==
The site is a base of operations and training area for members of the Sirius Dog Sled Patrol. In September 2015, as part of the newest defence agreement to increase the enforcement of sovereignty in Greenland, Mission Mestersvig was executed. The mission was to test the responsiveness of the military of Denmark and if the equipment could handle winter weather. HDMS Thetis, parts of the Guard Hussar Regiment, Hunter Corps and the Danish Frogman Corps all participated in the exercise.

Around 40 tonnes (39 long tons; 44 short tons) of Diesel fuel, used for vehicles and generators, was spilt on the land during its military use. Up to 5,000 tonnes (4,900 long tons; 5,500 short tons) of soil was contaminated. Danish Defence experimented with remediation of the soil with bacteria that took place from 2016, which proved effective despite the soil being frozen for 9 months of the year. Researchers found that by 2021 the bacteria had bioremediated around 82% of the contaminated soils.

United States troops from the Mountain Warfare Training Center trained with Danish special forces at the site in March 2024 as part of exercise Arctic Edge 24. By 2025 the base was permanently manned by the Danish military with three soldiers. In March 2025 the airstrip was used by the French military's Centre d'expertise aérienne militaire to certify the Airbus A400M Atlas for operations on ice runways. The certification may lead to additional options to resupply the base, which currently relies on the Lockheed Martin C-130J Super Hercules which carries less than half the cargo weight of the A400M.

On 22 September 2026, the United States, Denmark, and Greenland signed an agreement allowing the United States to establish a new "Defense Area" at Mestersvig.

== See also ==
- List of research stations in the Arctic
- Nerlerit Inaat Airport
- Stauning Alps
