= Clavering Island =

Island on the east coast of Greenland

Native name: Clavering Ø Nickname: Eskimonæs
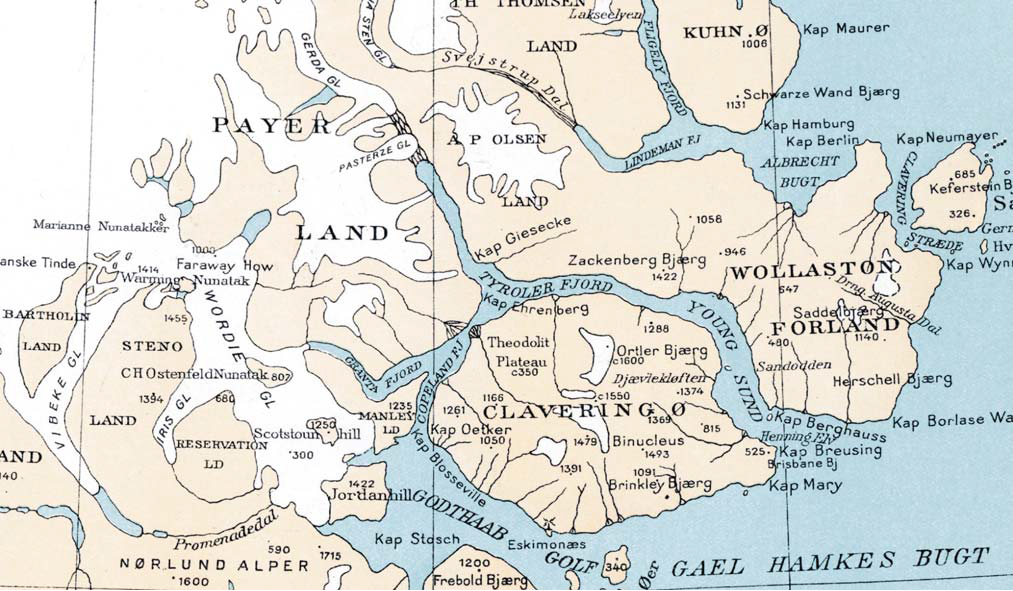
- Map drawn during Lauge Koch's expedition 1931-1934

- Location of Clavering Island in Greenland
- Interactive map of Clavering Island
- Etymology: Named to commemorate Douglas Charles Clavering

Geography
- Location: Greenland Sea
- Coordinates: 74°16′N 21°00′W
- Area: 1,488 km^{2} (575 sq mi)
- Area rank: 8th largest in Greenland
- Highest elevation: 1,650 m (5410 ft)
- Highest point: Ortlerspids

Administration
- Greenland
- Unincorporated area: NE Greenland National Park

Demographics
- Population: 0 (2021)
- Pop. density: 0/km^{2} (0/sq mi)
- Ethnic groups: none

Clavering Island (Danish: Clavering Ø) is a large island in eastern Greenland off Gael Hamke Bay, to the south of Wollaston Foreland.

The Eskimonæs radio and weather station was on this island. It was staffed by Danish scientists and was captured by German troops in 1943. The place where the station stood had also been the location of the last Inuit settlement in Northeast Greenland around 1823.

== History ==
The island was named by the second German North Polar Expedition 1869–70 as Clavering Insel (German for island) to commemorate Douglas Charles Clavering (1794–1827), commander of the Griper on the 1823 voyage, which explored the area and, at the southern shore of this island made the first (and last) encounter that Europeans made with the now extinct Northeast-Greenland Inuit.

In late August 1823, Clavering and the crew of the Griper encountered a band of twelve Inuit, including men, women and children. In his journal, Clavering described their seal-skin tent, canoe, and clothes, their harpoons and spear tipped with bone and meteoric iron, and their physical appearance ("tawny coppery" skin, "black hair and round visages; their hands and feet very fleshy, and much swelled"). He remarked on their skill in skinning a seal, the custom of sprinkling water over a seal or walrus before skinning, and their amazement at the demonstration of firearms for hunting.

European visitors to Northeast Greenland prior to 1823 reported evidence of extensive Inuit settlement in the region although they encountered no humans. Later expeditions, starting with the Second German North Polar Expedition in 1869, found the remains of many former settlements, but the population had apparently died out during the intervening years.

Bones of muskoxen have been found at Inuit sites on the island, but no such animals were reported by Clavering in 1823. Large numbers of Arctic hare bones suggest that the Inuit were reduced to hunting smaller game after the extinction of muskoxen in the area. After humans died out, muskoxen returned, and the first pair of live muskoxen ever to be brought to Europe were captured at Clavering Island in 1899.

=== Eskimonæs ===
The Eskimonæs radio and telegraph station stood on a small peninsula in the south coast of Clavering Island. The place had been named Eskimonæsset by the 1929-30 Expedition to East Greenland led by Lauge Koch, after the abandoned Inuit settlement of four houses, of which two were excavated at the time. The station was built as a scientific post and was also used later as a base by the Three-year Expedition to East Greenland, as well as by other scientists from 1931 to 1939. From 1941 to 1943, it became the headquarters of the Danish North-East Greenland Sledge Patrol.

During the war, the code name used for the Eskimonæs Station by the US Coast Guard was 'Bluie East Five' — the same code name would be later used for Myggbukta after Eskimonæs was destroyed. The main building at Eskimonæs was burnt by a German military patrol on 25 March 1943, and the site was bombed by the US Air Force on 14 May the same year. The burnt out station would be replaced by Dødemandsbugten Station, also known as Ny Station, which was built nearby further to the east later in the same year. Dødemandsbugten would be succeeded in 1944 by Daneborg and the ruins of the two former stations lay now abandoned and remain essentially undisturbed as a conspicuous memorial to war-time events. The efforts of the North-East Greenland Sledge Patrol led by Ib Poulson in World War II were chronicled after the war by English author David Armine Howarth in his 1951 book The Sledge Patrol.

== Geography ==
Clavering Island is a coastal island, separated from the mainland by fjords and sounds of the Greenland Sea, some of which are narrow. The Tyrolerfjord bounds the island in the north, with its extension, the Young Sound in the northeast, Rudi Bay and the Copeland Fjord in the west, the Godthåb Gulf in the southwest, and Gael Hamke Bay in the southeast. Payer Land lies to the west, A. P. Olsen Land to the north, Wollaston Forland to the east and northeast.

The island's highest point is the 1650 m high Ortlerspids and the island has an area of 1,534.6 km^{2} (592.5 sq mi) and a shoreline of 165.4 km (102.8 mi). The Halle Range (Hallebjergene) is an up to 1,200-metre-high (3,900 ft) mountain chain on the southwest part of Clavering Island that was named by Lauge Koch during his 1929–30 expedition.

Some small islands are located nearby, such as the Finsch Islands to the south and Jackson Island far to the southeast at the mouth of the bay.

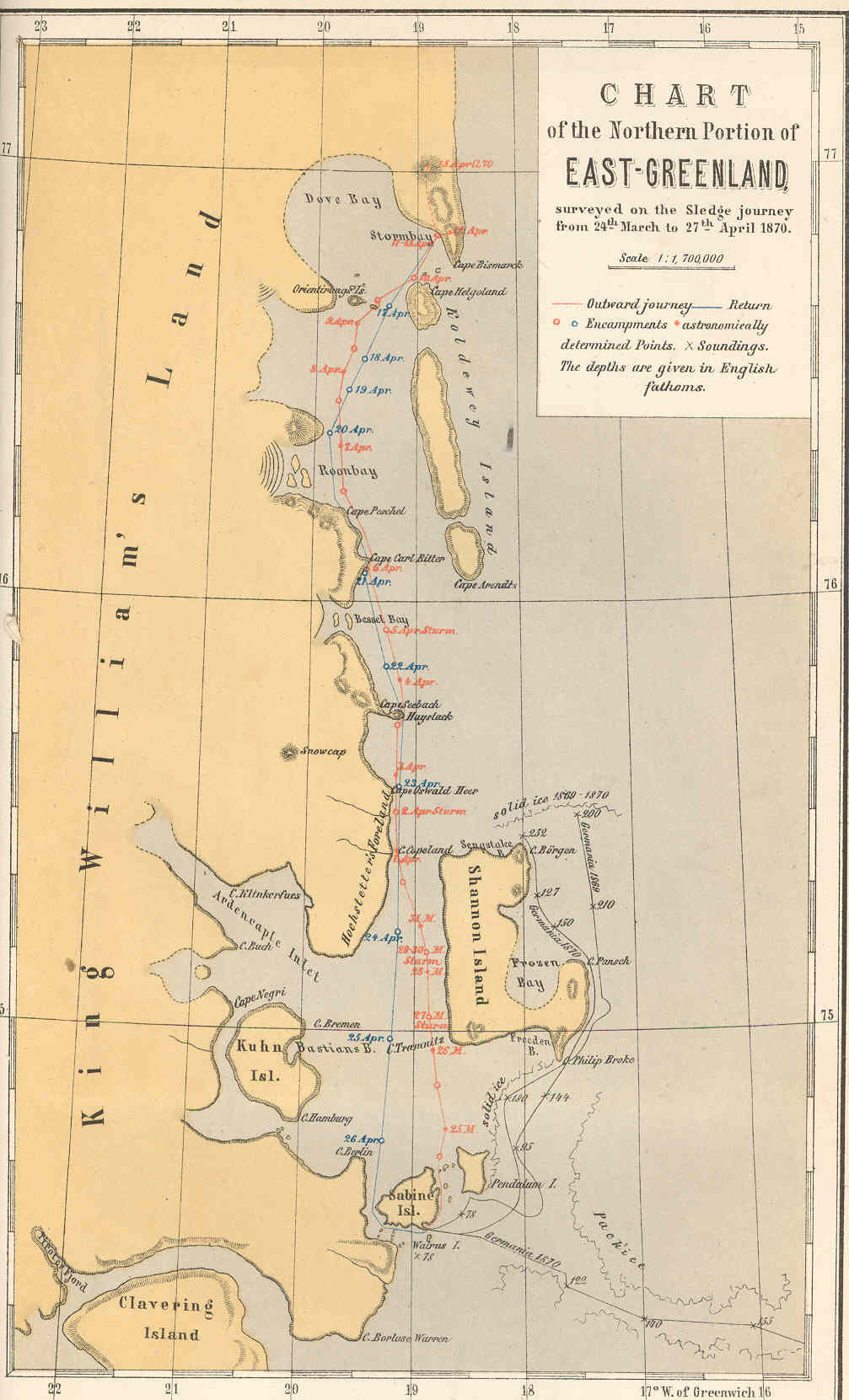
1870 map of the Northern Portion of Eastern Greenland showing coastal islands.

Map of the area around Clavering Island.

== See also ==
- Greenland in World War II
- List of islands of Greenland

== Bibliography ==
- Glob, P.V. 1946: Eskimo settlements in Northeast Greenland. Meddelelser om Grønland 144(6), 40 pp.
