= King Christian X Land =

King Christian X Land Kunngi Kristumi X Nuna (Greenlandic) Kong Christian X Land (Danish)
- Region
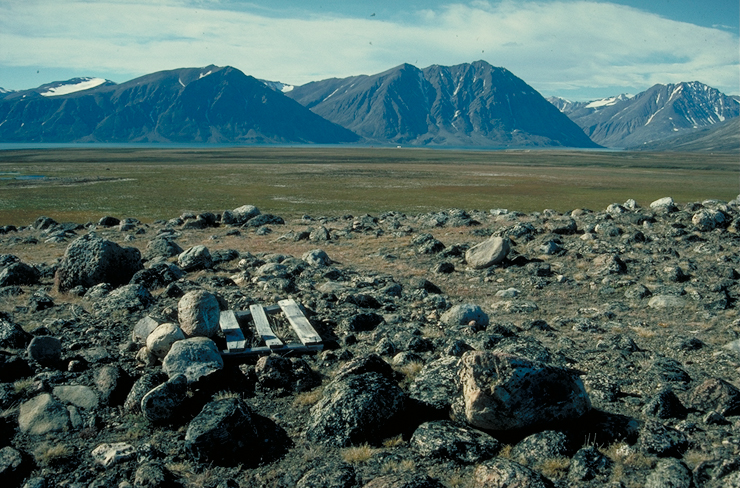
- Landscape of King Christian X Land in Wollaston Foreland.

- Location of King Christian X Land
- Coordinates: 74.0°N 28.1°W
- Sovereign state: (Danish Realm) Kingdom of Denmark
- Autonomous Territory: Greenland
- Administrative division: Northeast Greenland National Park
- Named for: King Christian X
- Elevation: 1,000 m (3,300 ft)

King Christian X Land (Greenlandic: Kunngi Kristumi X Nuna; Danish: Kong Christian X Land) is an area of northeastern Greenland.

== History ==
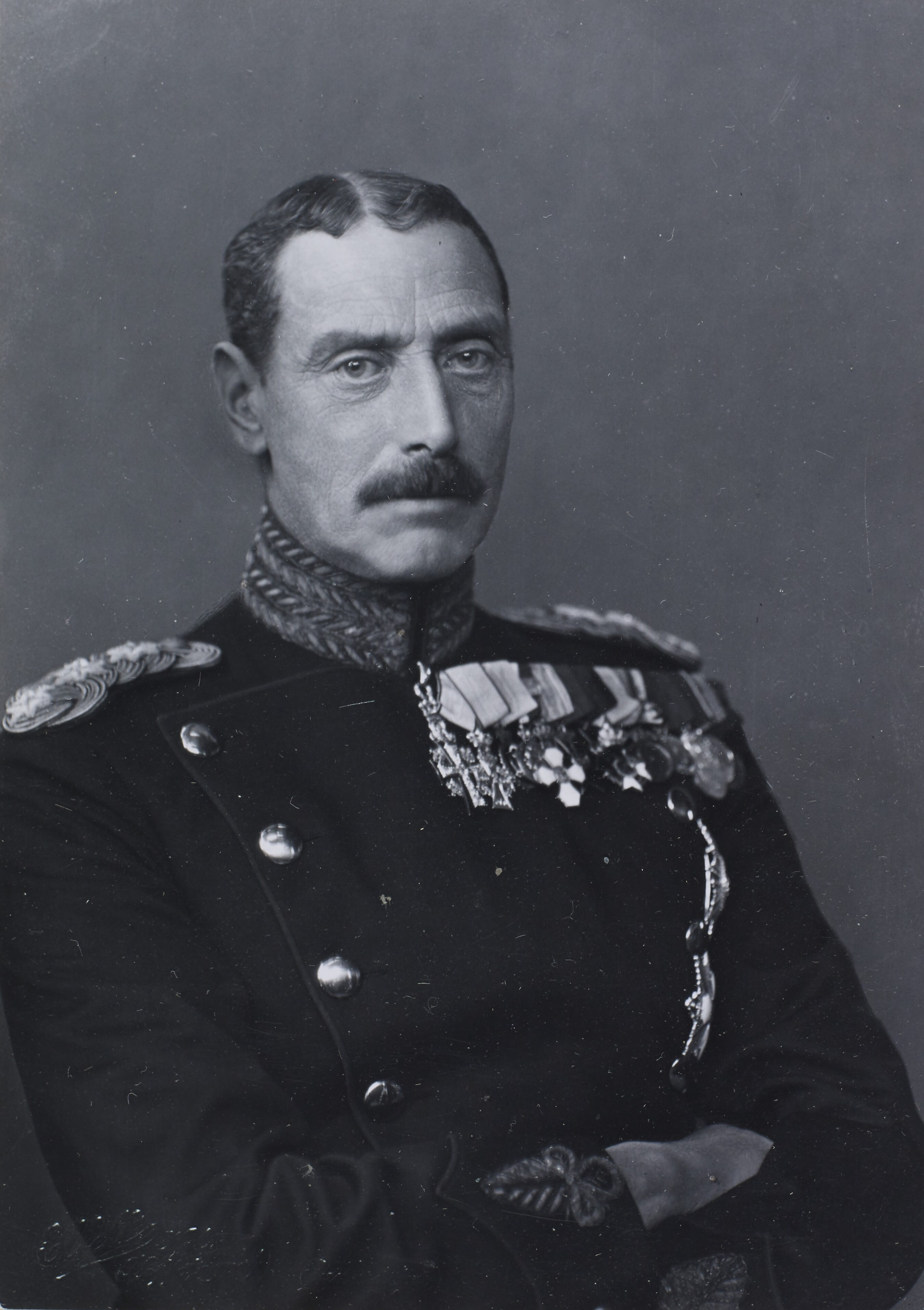
Christian X (r. 1912–1947) who the area is named after

This area was named after King Christian X of Denmark and Iceland (r. 1912–1947). At the time of the Three-year Expedition to East Greenland, it is reported that, when Lauge Koch was planning to fly over the region in 1932, he said:

Let’s get this over with as quickly as possible and then we can call the whole thing King Christian X Land.

The name 'King Christian X Land' was first used on the 1932 1:1 million scale Danish Geodesic Institute map. At that time the area was occupied by Norway and was renamed 'Erik the Red's Land' (Eirik Raudes Land) but the Permanent Court of International Justice ruled against Norway in 1933 and the country subsequently abandoned its claims.

Myggbukta was a Norwegian radio and weather station that operated in the coast intermittently during the 20th century.

== Geography ==
King Christian X Land stretches above the Arctic Circle between the Scoresby Sound at 70°N and the Bessel Fjord at 76°N. It is bordered by King Christian IX Land on the south, King Frederik VIII Land to the north, and the Greenland Ice Sheet to the west. All its territory is included in the large Northeast Greenland National Park zone.

It includes the Stauning Alps, Scoresby Land, as well as the vast glacier and fjord expanses of northeastern Greenland between the ice sheet area west of the Kaiser Franz Joseph Fjord and the eastern end of Wollaston Foreland in the shore of the Greenland Sea.

The area is uninhabited except for Daneborg station, Zackenberg research facility located near the Zackenberg mountain. and the Mestersvig military outpost.

=== Image gallery ===
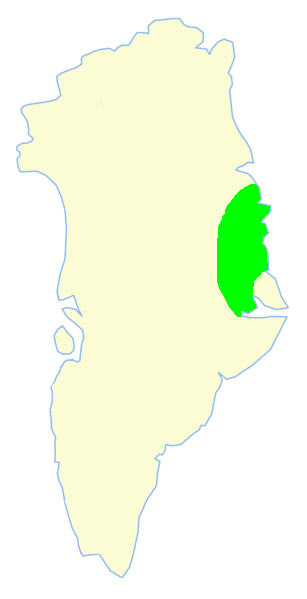
Limits of King Christian X Land.

Norwegian-occupied Erik the Red's Land (1931-1933)

Map of Northeastern Greenland.
