= Daneborg =

Station in northeast Greenland

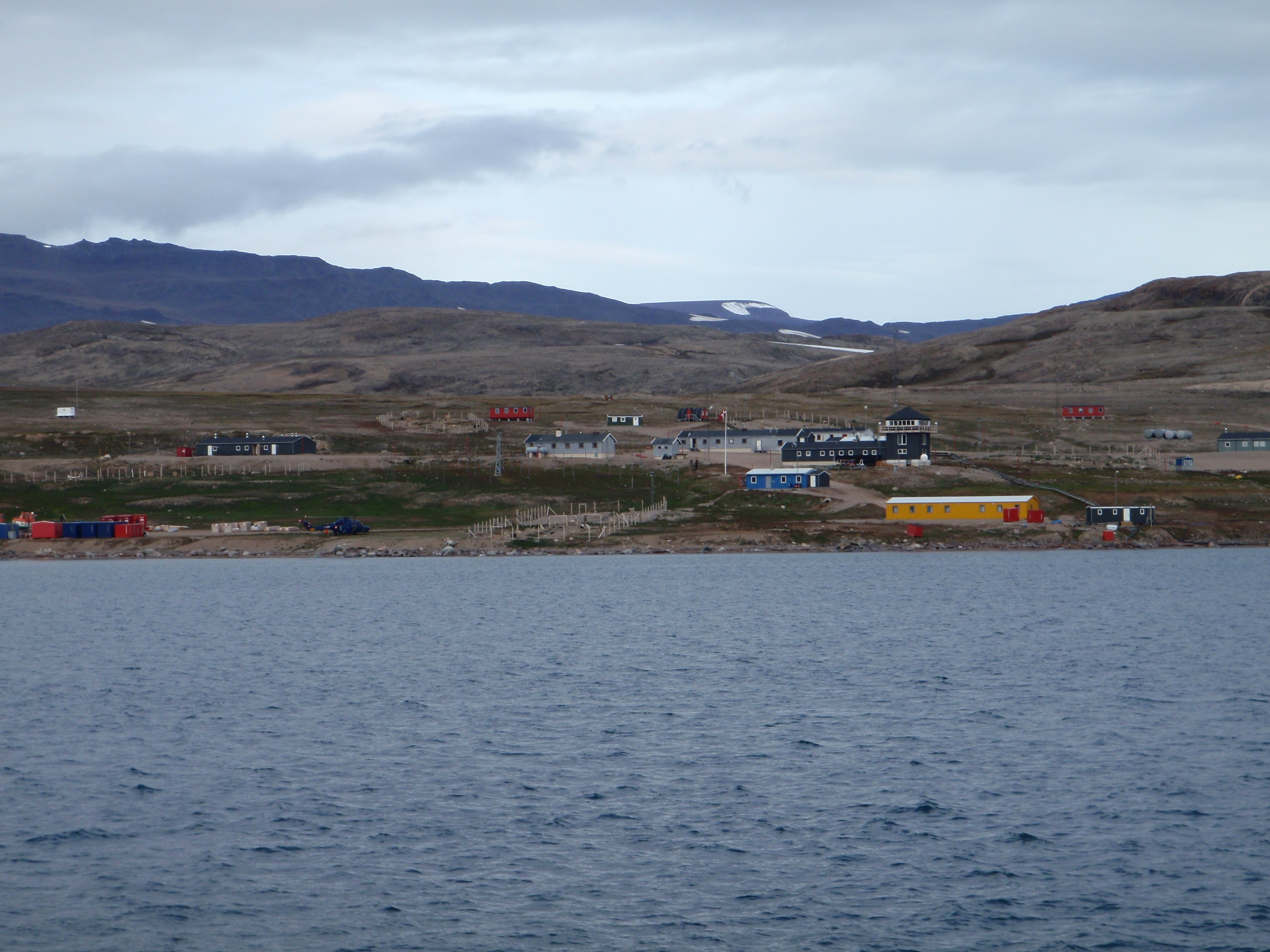
Daneborg on 2008-08-12

Location of Daneborg Station within Northeast Greenland National Park

Daneborg (or Daneborg Station) is a station on the south coast of Wollaston Foreland peninsula of northeast Greenland, at the mouth of Young Sund emptying into Greenland Sea. Daneborg serves as the headquarters for the Sirius Patrol, the dog sled patrollers of the Northeast Greenland National Park, the largest national park in the world. The number of persons at the station is few and varies considerably from summer to winter. Daneborg is the most populated of stations in the park, with an over-wintering population of 12. Daneborg has an approximately 400 metres (1,300 ft) long airstrip (ICAO: BGDB).

== History ==
The previous sledge patrol headquarters, Eskimonæs, 27 km southwest of later Daneborg at Dødemandsbugten on the south coast of Clavering Ø, which had also been the location of the last Inuit settlement in Northeast Greenland (1823), was destroyed by German World War II invaders on March 23, 1943. The story of the wartime efforts of the North-East Greenland Sledge Patrol under Ib Poulson were chronicled postwar by English author David Armine Howarth in his 1951 book The Sledge Patrol.

The station at the site of the current Daneborg was originally established in summer 1944, during World War II, under the command of Captain Strong of US Coast Guard Cutter Storis near the trapping station Sandodden, as an American military weather station, and staffed with six men of the 8th Weather Squadron Detachment.

At the end of the war, the station was taken over by the North East Greenland Sledge Patrol as their new regional headquarters and named Daneborg. Part of the station was built by material left behind at the German wartime station Lille Koldeway further north, which had been established by Operation Edelweiss II.

== Climate ==
The Kitsissut Islands experience a tundra climate (Köppen: ET); with short, cool summers and long, frigid winters. With very low annual rain or snowfall it has strong desert influences.

Climate data for Daneborg (1981-2010 normals)
Month	Jan	Feb	Mar	Apr	May	Jun	Jul	Aug	Sep	Oct	Nov	Dec	Year
Record high °C (°F)	8.5 (47.3)	6.2 (43.2)	2.0 (35.6)	6.0 (42.8)	10.3 (50.5)	24.1 (75.4)	24.1 (75.4)	22.4 (72.3)	12.3 (54.1)	9.3 (48.7)	6.8 (44.2)	3.3 (37.9)	24.1 (75.4)
Mean daily maximum °C (°F)	−16.3 (2.7)	−16.7 (1.9)	−16.5 (2.3)	−9.8 (14.4)	−1.9 (28.6)	3.8 (38.8)	7.0 (44.6)	6.4 (43.5)	0.2 (32.4)	−8.2 (17.2)	−13.2 (8.2)	−15.5 (4.1)	−6.6 (20.1)
Daily mean °C (°F)	−18.9 (−2.0)	−19.2 (−2.6)	−19.1 (−2.4)	−12.8 (9.0)	−4.6 (23.7)	1.7 (35.1)	4.8 (40.6)	4.3 (39.7)	−1.6 (29.1)	−9.9 (14.2)	−15.4 (4.3)	−18.0 (−0.4)	−9.0 (15.8)
Mean daily minimum °C (°F)	−21.4 (−6.5)	−21.6 (−6.9)	−21.6 (−6.9)	−15.7 (3.7)	−7.2 (19.0)	−0.4 (31.3)	2.6 (36.7)	2.1 (35.8)	−3.4 (25.9)	−11.5 (11.3)	−17.6 (0.3)	−20.5 (−4.9)	−11.3 (11.7)
Record low °C (°F)	−41.0 (−41.8)	−42.8 (−45.0)	−41.1 (−42.0)	−35.0 (−31.0)	−23.9 (−11.0)	−9.2 (15.4)	−8.4 (16.9)	−11.8 (10.8)	−8.1 (17.4)	−30.7 (−23.3)	−35.0 (−31.0)	−38.9 (−38.0)	−42.8 (−45.0)
Average precipitation mm (inches)	7.8 (0.31)	16.6 (0.65)	6.2 (0.24)	2.0 (0.08)	4.4 (0.17)	0.0 (0.0)	0.0 (0.0)	0.0 (0.0)	2.7 (0.11)	4.4 (0.17)	0.0 (0.0)	0.0 (0.0)	55.0 (2.17)
Source: Météo Climat

Climate data for Daneborg (74.30°N 20.22°W) (13 m (43 ft) AMSL) (1991-2020 data)
Month	Jan	Feb	Mar	Apr	May	Jun	Jul	Aug	Sep	Oct	Nov	Dec	Year
Record high °C (°F)	6.0 (42.8)	2.5 (36.5)	3.5 (38.3)	5.2 (41.4)	10.1 (50.2)	16.4 (61.5)	18.8 (65.8)	18.9 (66.0)	12.2 (54.0)	9.2 (48.6)	3.7 (38.7)	3.3 (37.9)	18.9 (66.0)
Mean daily maximum °C (°F)	−15.1 (4.8)	−16.2 (2.8)	−15.9 (3.4)	−9.2 (15.4)	−1.6 (29.1)	4.2 (39.6)	7.5 (45.5)	7.2 (45.0)	1.3 (34.3)	−6.7 (19.9)	−11.7 (10.9)	−14.8 (5.4)	−5.9 (21.4)
Daily mean °C (°F)	−18.2 (−0.8)	−19.2 (−2.6)	−19.0 (−2.2)	−12.6 (9.3)	−4.3 (24.3)	1.8 (35.2)	5.1 (41.2)	4.7 (40.5)	−0.7 (30.7)	−8.5 (16.7)	−14.2 (6.4)	−17.9 (−0.2)	−8.6 (16.5)
Mean daily minimum °C (°F)	−21.3 (−6.3)	−22.4 (−8.3)	−22.6 (−8.7)	−16.3 (2.7)	−7.3 (18.9)	−0.5 (31.1)	2.7 (36.9)	2.5 (36.5)	−2.4 (27.7)	−10.3 (13.5)	−16.7 (1.9)	−20.9 (−5.6)	−11.3 (11.7)
Record low °C (°F)	−35.4 (−31.7)	−37.7 (−35.9)	−39.6 (−39.3)	−30.6 (−23.1)	−23.0 (−9.4)	−7.3 (18.9)	−4.4 (24.1)	−4.0 (24.8)	−9.7 (14.5)	−26.2 (−15.2)	−30.2 (−22.4)	−36.0 (−32.8)	−37.7 (−35.9)
Average precipitation mm (inches)	35 (1.4)	17 (0.7)	32 (1.3)	21 (0.8)	8 (0.3)	10 (0.4)	13 (0.5)	22 (0.9)	18 (0.7)	18 (0.7)	13 (0.5)	22 (0.9)	231 (9.1)
Average extreme snow depth cm (inches)	71 (28)	97 (38)	109 (43)	114 (45)	96 (38)	40 (16)	3 (1.2)	0 (0)	4 (1.6)	13 (5.1)	32 (13)	50 (20)	114 (45)
Average precipitation days (≥ 1.0 mm)	5.2	3.3	4.1	3.3	1.7	2.1	2.7	3.8	3.4	3.8	3.2	4.5	40.9
Average snowy days	7.6	5.3	6.3	4.8	3.4	2.5	0.3	1.7	5.3	5.9	5.3	6.2	54.5
Average relative humidity (%)	69.9	67.2	64.6	67.3	76.7	82.8	80.1	77.0	74.0	71.6	67.3	66.4	72.1
Source: Danish Meteorological Institute (1991-2020 temperature & humidity) (1958-1975 precipitation & snow)

== See also ==
- List of research stations in the Arctic
