= Sirius Dog Sled Patrol =

Elite Danish naval unit

- Slædepatruljen Sirius
- Badge of the Sirius Dog Sled Patrol
- Founded: 1941; 85 years ago
- Country: Kingdom of Denmark
- Allegiance: Kingdom of Denmark
- Branch: Joint Arctic Command
- Type: Special Operations Forces
- Role: Reconnaissance; Enforcing national sovereignty Information operations
- Size: 14
- Garrison/HQ: Daneborg (74° 18'N 20° 14'W)
- Nickname: Siriuspatruljen
- Mascot: A sled dog
- Engagements: World War II

Commanders
- Chief of Defence: General Flemming Lentfer
- Chief of Joint Arctic Command: Maj. Gen. Stig Østergaard Nielsen

The Sirius Dog Sled Patrol (Danish: Slædepatruljen Sirius), known informally as Siriuspatruljen (the Sirius Patrol) and formerly known as North-East Greenland Sledge Patrol and Resolute Dog Sled Patrol, is an elite Danish naval unit. It conducts long-range reconnaissance patrolling, and enforces Danish sovereignty in the Arctic wilderness of northern and eastern Greenland, an area that includes the Northeast Greenland National Park, which is the largest national park in the world. Patrolling is usually done in pairs and using dog sleds with about a dozen dogs, sometimes for four months and often without additional human contact.

The Sirius Dog Sled Patrol has the ability to engage militarily, and has done so historically. Its purpose is to maintain Danish sovereignty and police its area of responsibility. The physical and psychological demands for acceptance into the unit are exceptional.

== History ==
In 1933 the international court of the League of Nations ruled in the Danish-Norwegian dispute over Erik the Red's Land that for it to remain Danish, Denmark had to assert its sovereignty there. Initially, this presence was in the form of two fixed police stations.

The Sirius Dog Sled Patrol, first known as the North-East Greenland Sledge Patrol, was activated in the summer of 1941 during World War II to conduct long-range reconnaissance patrols along the northeast coast of Greenland thereby preventing German presence there. Its headquarters was at Eskimonæs, which had been until then a scientific station. At the time, the Germans established a number of secret weather stations on the eastern coast of the island to provide them with invaluable meteorological information, (Note: Such as in Operation Holzauge) both to assist their U-boat campaign and to predict the weather in the European theatre. Thus the patrol's discovery of these stations denied Germany such information with significant implications both for the Battle of the Atlantic and for air and land fighting in Europe, despite the enormous distance of Greenland from the main theatres of war.

The Sirius Dog Sled Patrol cooperated with Nanok East Greenland Fishing Company, the only other organization active in the remote area, which built a number of hunting huts in the uninhabited expanses of north eastern Greenland.

The Sirius Dog Sled Patrol discovered the German weather station Holzauge at Hansa Bay on the northeast coast of Sabine Island, which was subsequently destroyed by United States Army Air Forces (USAAF) bombers from Iceland. During the war, the unit suffered one man killed in action. Two others were captured by German forces, but escaped and rejoined the patrol.

In 2008, the National Bank of Denmark issued a 10-DKK commemorative coin of Sirius.

On 16 September 2023, an unwitnessed tsunami resulting from the 2023 Greenland landslide struck the northern part of Ella Island, penetrating 50 metres (55 yd) inland and devastating the Sirius Dog Sled Patrol station there, washing much of it into the sea. The station was closed for the winter, and no one was present when the wave hit. The cruise ship Ocean Albatros arrived on the scene on 17 September and contacted the Joint Arctic Command with the first report of the damage. On 19 September, personnel from the Sirius Dog Sled Patrol and the Royal Danish Navy patrol vessel HDMS Knud Rasmussen began clean-up and salvage work at the site, which they completed by 21 September despite a 20 September warning by officials to ships in the area to avoid putting crew members or passengers ashore because of a risk of additional tsunamis.

== Organization ==
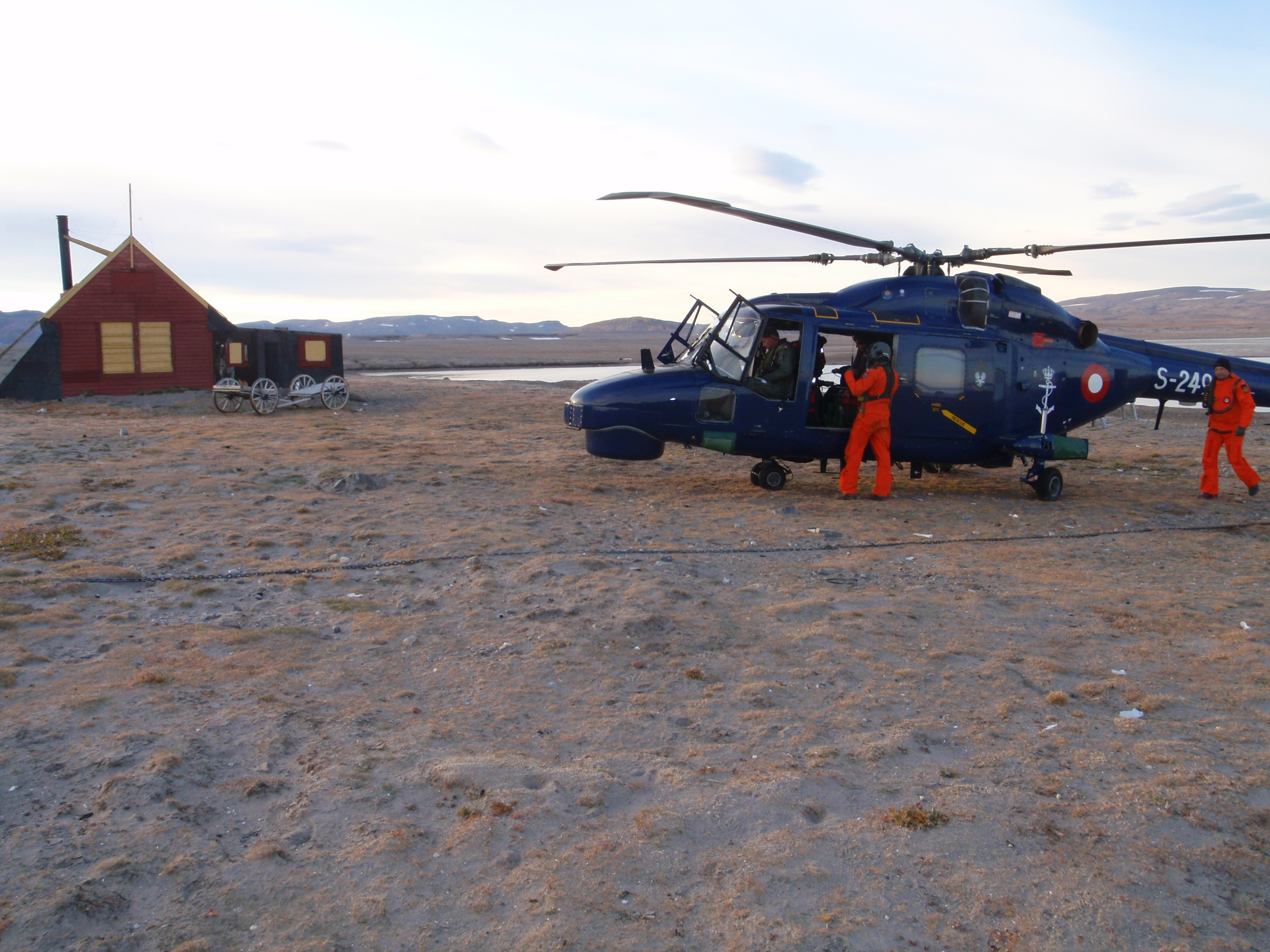
The base at Daneborg in 2008

Since October 2012, the Joint Arctic Command has been responsible for the Sirius Dog Sled Patrol.

The Sirius Dog Sled Patrol used to be operationally under the Greenland Command, and administratively under the Royal Danish Navy and also represents Denmark's military presence in northeast Greenland.

The Sirius Dog Sled Patrol operates in the northern and northeastern part of Greenland, from the west coast of Hall Land (Petermann Fjord and Glacier) 81°04′N 61°40′W to Cape Biot north of Fleming Fjord 71°53′N 22°33′W. The flying distance between the two points is about 2,100 kilometres (1,300 mi), but the length along the coastline is far greater, around 16,000 kilometres (9,900 mi) The Greenland ice sheet is not a part of the patrolled area.

The Sirius Dog Sled Patrol is stationed at Daneborg (74°11′N 20°08′W), and maintains personnel at Station Nord, Danmarkshavn, and Mestersvig.

The Sirius Dog Sled Patrol uses more than 50 depot huts scattered across the patrolled area. The depot huts are resupplied by small boats in the southern area, and by aircraft in the northern part.

The Sirius Dog Sled Patrol consists of six dog sled teams for the duration of the year, each consisting of two men, and 11 to 15 dogs. When traveling, each team carries approximately 350 to 500 kilograms (770 to 1,100 lb), depending on the distance to the next depot.

As of 2015, the Sirius Dog Sled Patrol consisted of 12 patrolmen and two radio operators.

== Operational structure ==
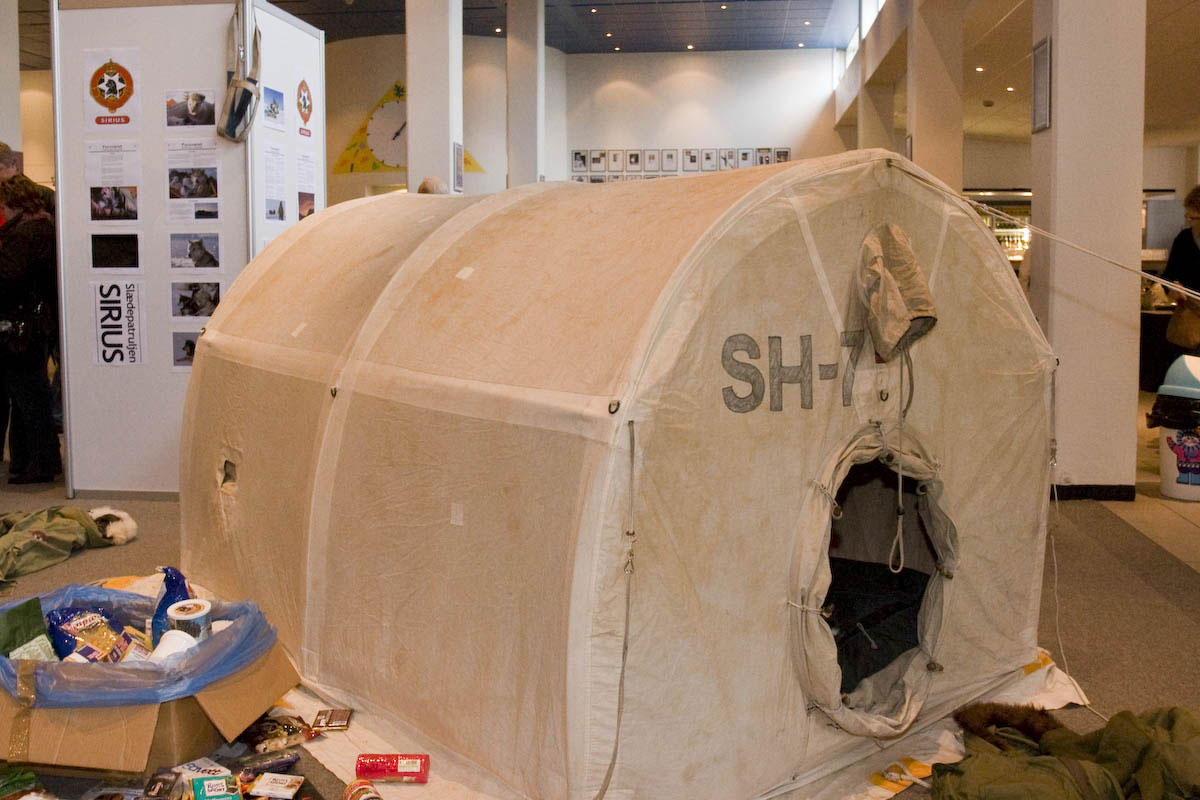
Sirius Dog Sled Patrol tent setup

Sled patrolling is divided into two periods. Depending on when the ice becomes thick enough, the autumn patrol starts sometime in November, and lasts until late-December. The sun sets for the last time around the beginning of November, and in the increasing darkness the winter storms get progressively worse, and more frequent. Getting home before Christmas is therefore not always possible for members of the unit. Around the end of January, when the weather stabilizes, and the sun reappears, the longer journeys begin and last until June, when the ice begins to break apart and drift southwards. During this period, the six sled teams will cover a large part of the coastline, and within a period of three to four years all areas will be visited.

== Recruitment and training ==
Candidates for the Sirius Dog Sled Patrol must have completed their compulsory service in the Danish Defense. At the tryouts, seven men are selected to start on about six months of various training courses. Women can apply, but none have yet.

- Survival course in Greenland (six weeks)
- Shooting course
- Boat course
- Meteorology course
- Veterinary course
- Demolition course
- Engine and mechanics course
- Reconnaissance course
- Firefighter course
- Radio and communications course
- Arctic patrol first aid course
- Sewing course
- Cooking and hygiene course
- Truck course

The courses run from December to the end of May. The final group consisting of six men is picked as late as two to three weeks before they depart to Greenland for 26 consecutive months.

Contrary to popular belief, King Frederik X never patrolled with the Sirius Dog Sled Patrol, but in 2000, he did participate in Expedition Sirius 2000 with four previous members of the patrol and a camera team, to celebrate the 50th anniversary of the Sirius Dog Sled Patrol. Subsequently, a piece of land was named after him.

== Equipment ==
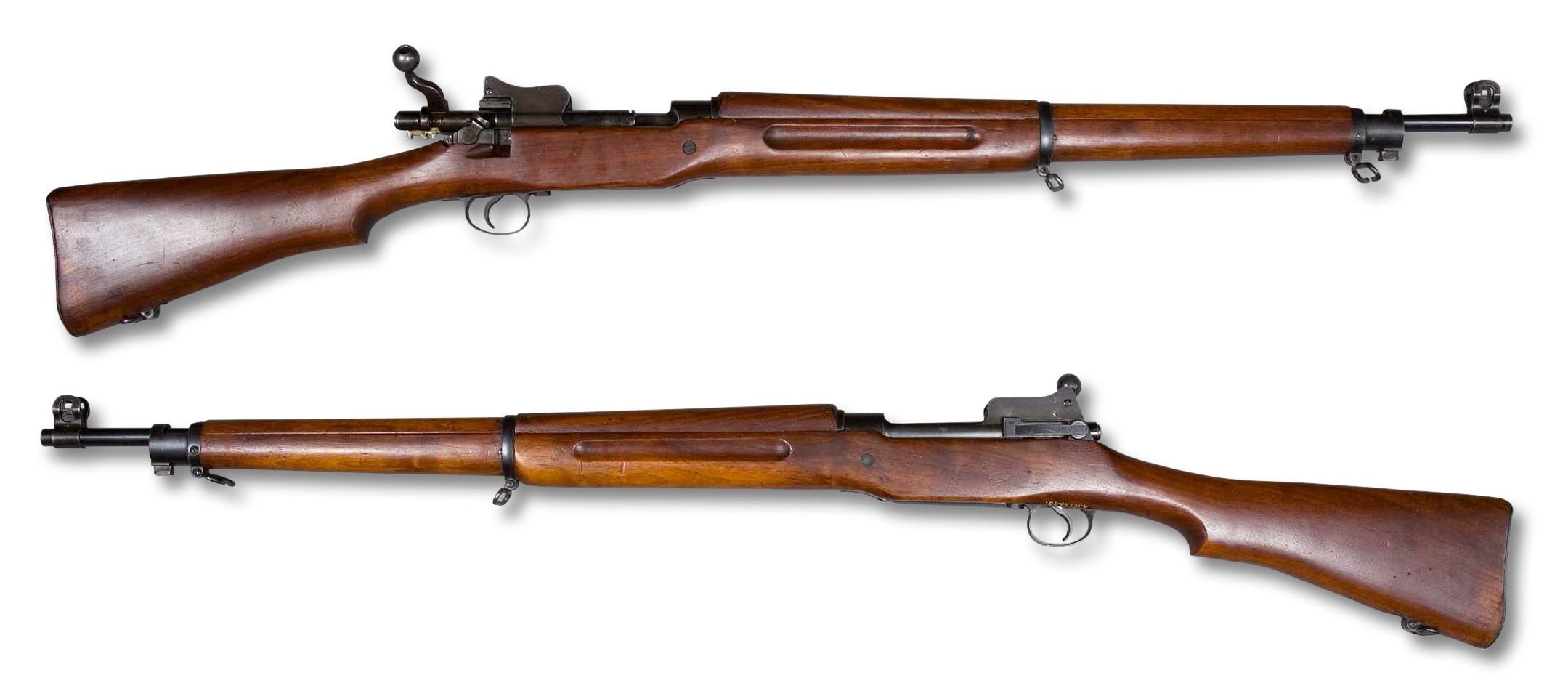
M1917 Enfield 30-06 Springfield rifle introduced during World War I

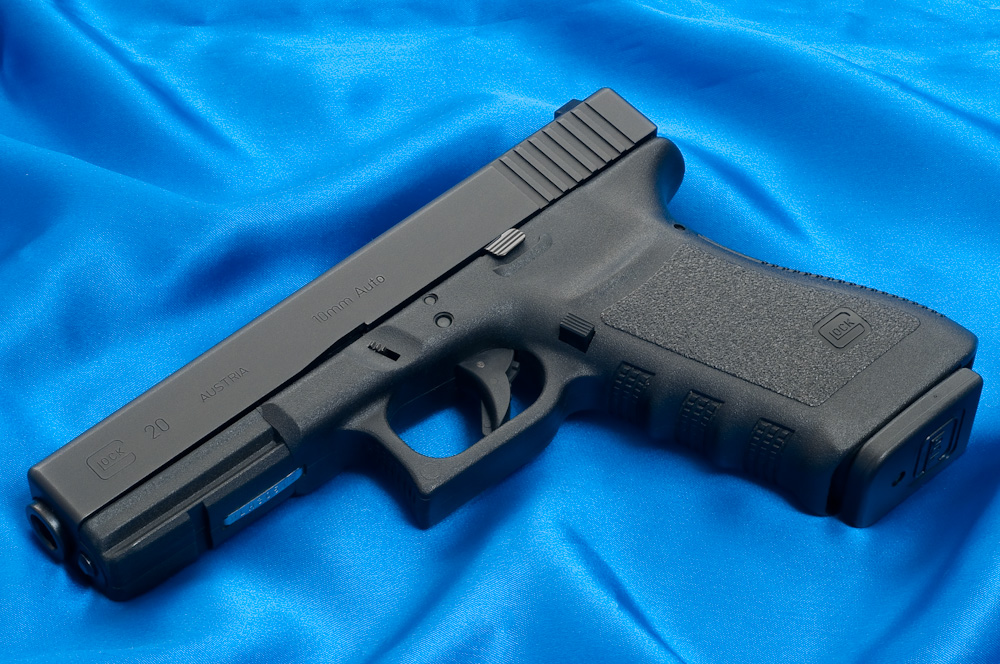
Glock 20 10mm Auto pistol

Because of the special nature of the Sirius Dog Sled Patrol operations, a wide range of unique equipment is required that is not normally used by the Danish armed forces.

The issued service weapons also reflect the special arctic operational conditions and requirements. Among the equipment used by the Sirius Dog Sled Patrol is the M1917 Enfield bolt-action rifle chambered in .30-06 Springfield, known in Danish service as the Gevær M/53 (17), and the Glock 20 pistol chambered in 10mm Auto.

The Sirius Dog Sled Patrol uses the standard .30-06 Springfield 163–168-grain (10.56–10.89 g) M2 armor-piercing military rifle round (normally intended for use against lightly armored vehicles, protective shelters, and personnel, and can be identified by its black bullet tip.). The patrolmen are uniquely allowed to use hollow-point civilian rounds (loaded with a type of expanding bullet prohibited in warfare for Danish and many other armed forces by the Hague Convention of 1899) to defend themselves against dangerous wild animals. The patrolmen feel that the M2 armor-piercing military round is best against aggressive polar bears at long range, but that the hollow-point civilian rounds are better against an enraged musk ox. Typically, the patrolmen arrange their magazine so every third round is a hollow-point.

The Sirius Dog Sled Patrol formerly used Pistol M/49 sidearms chambered in 9×19mm Parabellum, but they proved insufficient as a last resort defence against the polar bears encountered, and the current issue Glock 20 pistol chambered in more powerful 10mm Auto (10×25mm) was adopted.

== See also ==
- Joint Arctic Command
- Military of Greenland
- Military of Denmark
- Nanok East Greenland Fishing Company
- Sirius Passet
