= Northeast Greenland National Park =

National park in Greenland

- IUCN category II (national park)
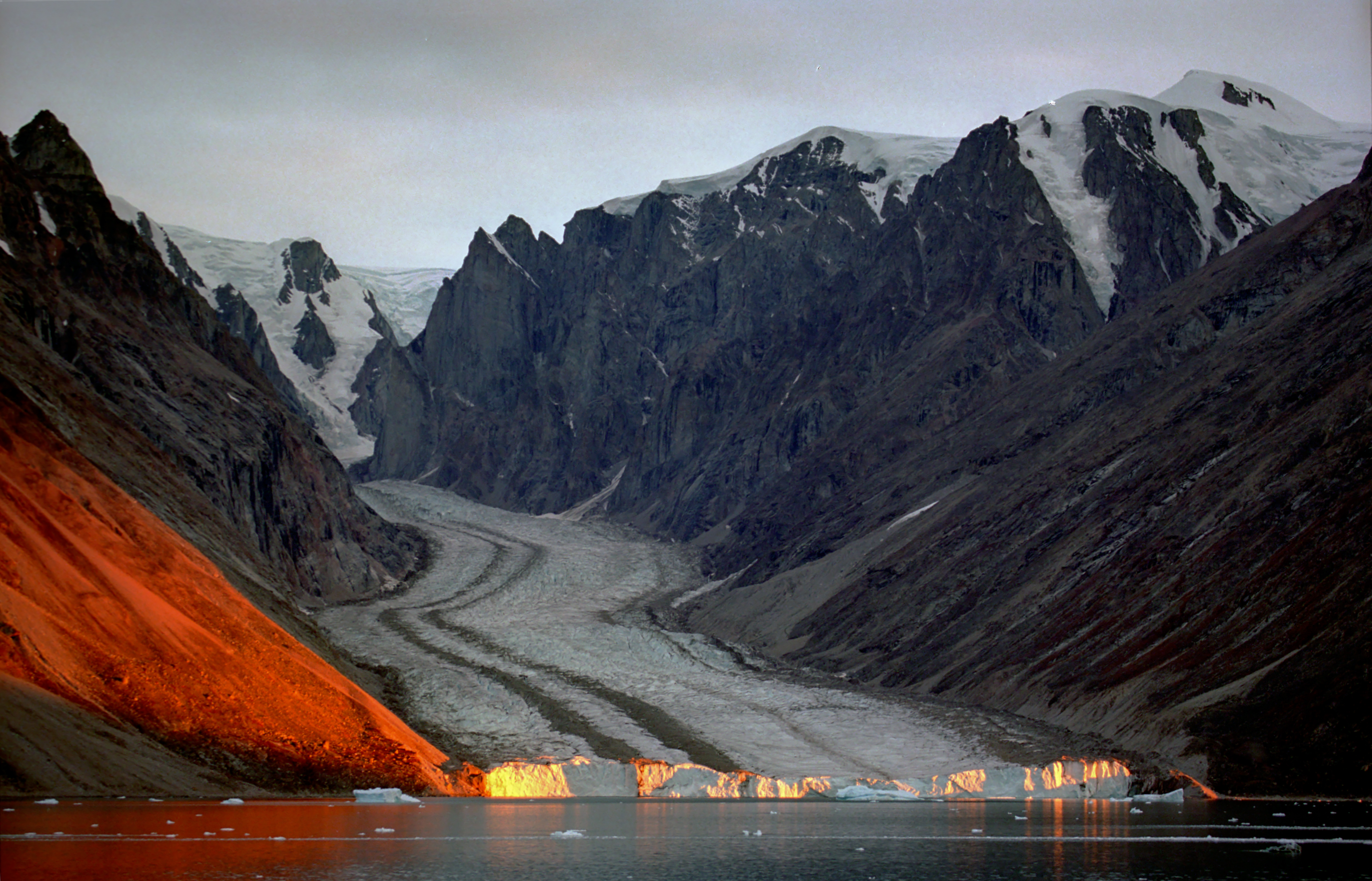
- Franz Josef Fjord, glacier. The orange colour is caused by reflected sunlight.

- Location: Greenland (Kingdom of Denmark)
- Nearest city: Nunatami
- Coordinates: 76°N 30°W
- Area: 972,000 km^{2} (375,000 sq mi)
- Established: 21 May 1974
- Visitors: >500 Yearly

Northeast Greenland National Park (Greenlandic: Kalaallit Nunaanni nuna eqqissisimatitaq, Danish: Nordøstgrønlands Nationalpark) is the world's largest national park and the 10th largest protected area (the only larger protected areas consist mostly of sea). Established in 1974, the Northeast Greenland national park expanded to its present size in 1988. It protects 972,000 km^{2} (375,000 mi^{2}) of the interior and northeastern coast of Greenland. This means that the national park is bigger than 166 of the world's 195 countries. It was the first national park to be created in the Kingdom of Denmark and is one of Greenland's two national parks, alongside Pilivik National Park (West Greenland National Park). It is the northernmost national park in the world. It is the second-largest by area of any second-level subdivision of any country in the world, trailing only the Qikiqtaaluk Region in Nunavut, Canada.

== Geography ==
The park shares borders, largely laid out as straight lines, with the Sermersooq municipality in the south and with the Avannaata municipality in the west, partly along the 45° West meridian on the ice cap. The large interior of the park is part of the Greenland Ice Sheet, but there are also large ice-free areas along the coast and on Peary Land in the north. The park includes the King Frederick VIII Land and King Christian X Land geographical areas.

== History ==
Originally established on 22 May 1974 from the northern, practically uninhabited part of the former Ittoqqortoormiit Municipality in Tunu (East Greenland), in 1988, the park was expanded by another 272,000 km^{2} (105,000 mi^{2}) to its present size, adding the northeastern part of the former county of Avannaa (North Greenland). In January 1977, it was designated an international biosphere reserve. The park is overseen by the Greenland Department of Environment and Nature. The historical research camps on the ice sheet—Eismitte and North Ice—fall within the boundaries of the present-day park.

== Population ==
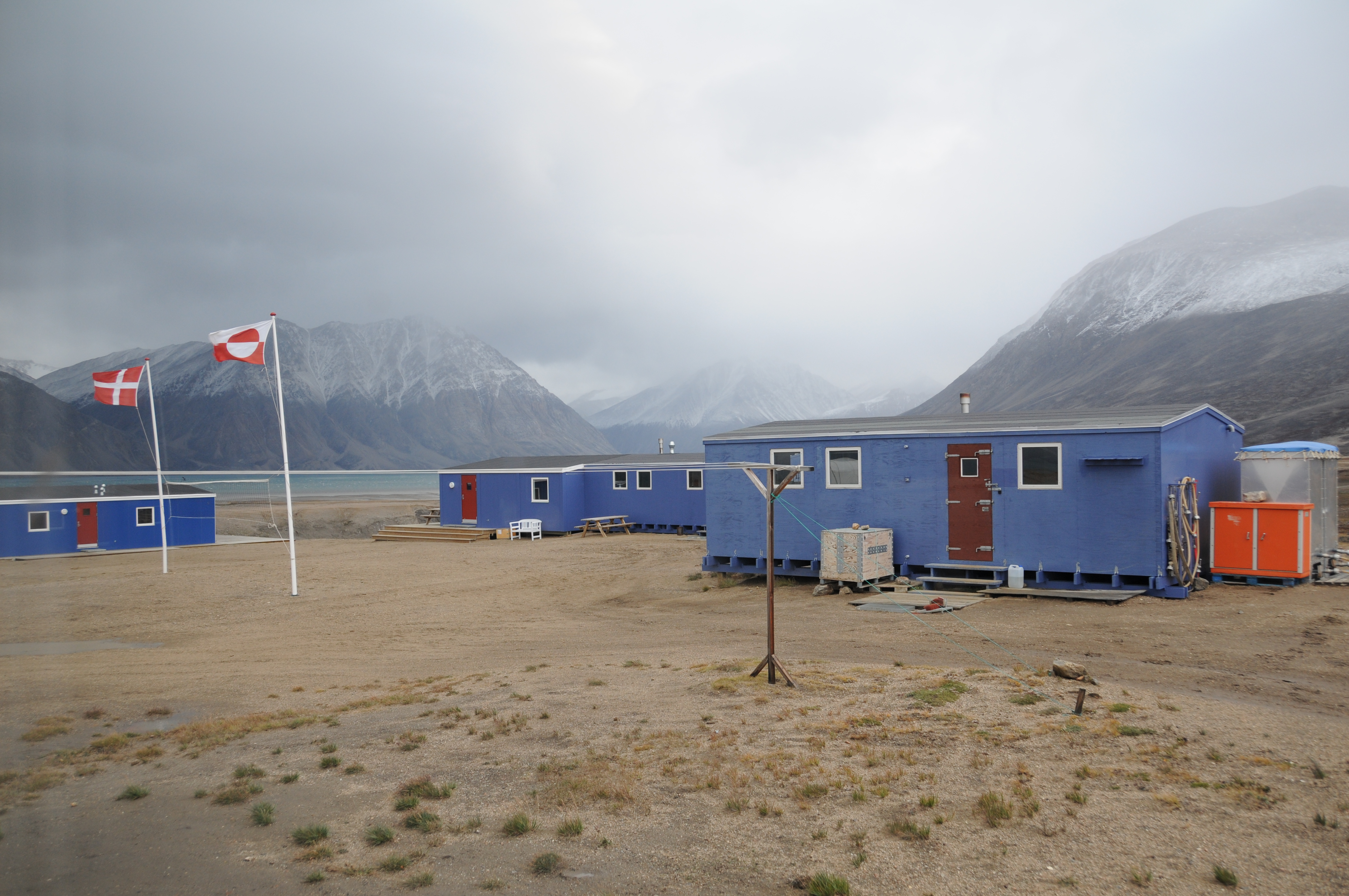
Zackenberg Station

The park has no permanent human population, although 400 sites see occasional summertime use. In 1986, the population of the park was 40, living at Mestersvig. These 40 were involved in cleanup and closeout operations at mining exploration sites and soon left. Since then, censuses have recorded zero permanent human population. In 2008, only 31 people and about 110 dogs were present over winter in North East Greenland, distributed among the following stations (all on the coast, except Summit Camp):

- Daneborg (12) headquarters of the Sirius Patrol, the park policing agency
- Danmarkshavn (8) civilian weather station
- Station Nord (5) military base
- Mestersvig (2) military outpost with 1,800 m (5,900 ft) gravel runway
- Zackenberg (0) summer-only research station
- Summit Camp (4) research station on the Greenland Ice Sheet

During summer, scientists add to these numbers. The research station Zackenberg Ecological Research Operations (ZERO; located at 74°28′11″N 20°34′15″W) can cater for over 20 scientists and station personnel.

== Fauna ==
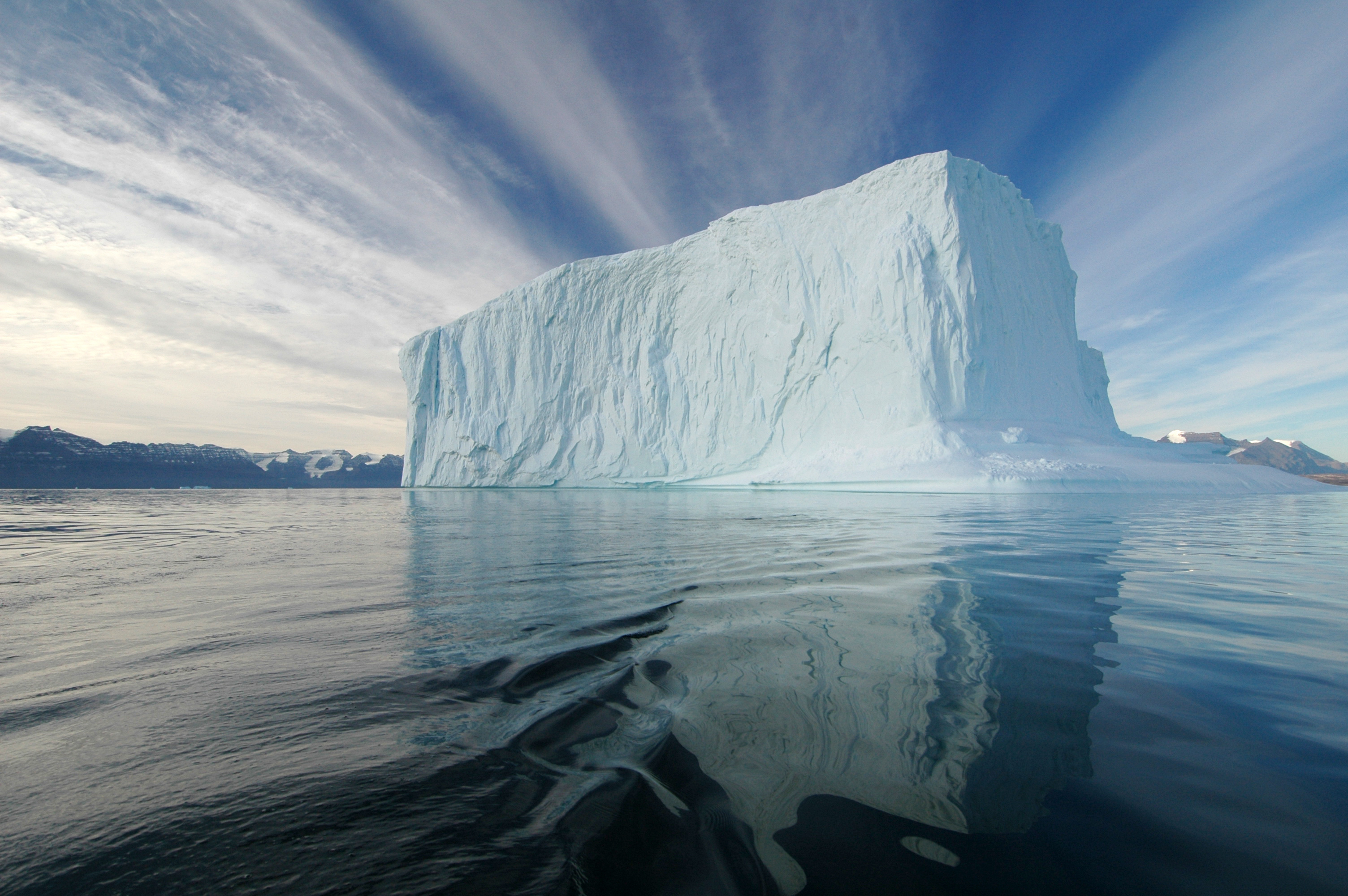
Iceberg in the national park

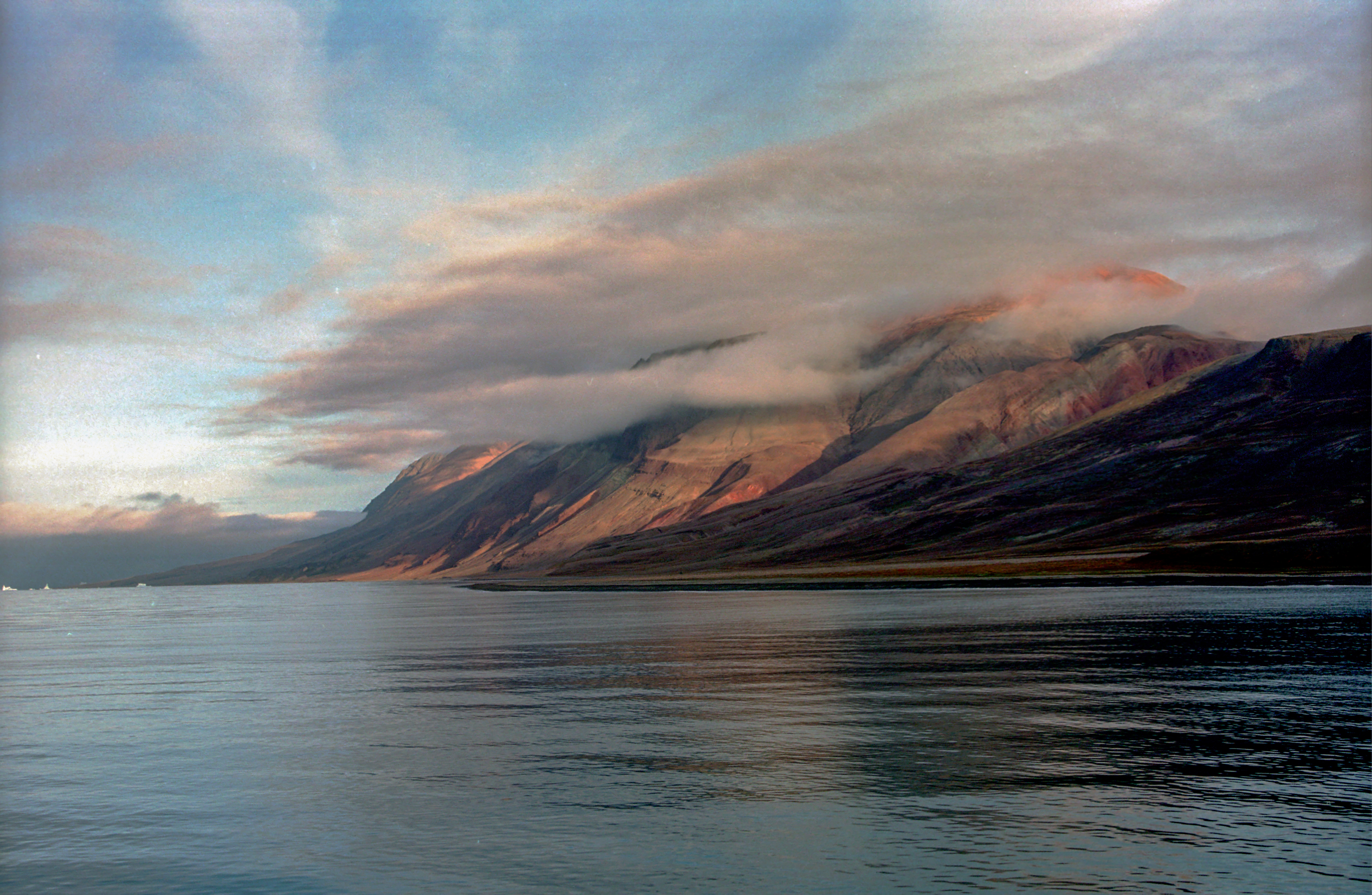
Ymer Island on the southeastern coastline

An estimated 5,000 to 15,000 musk oxen, as well as numerous polar bears and walrus, can be found near the coastal regions of the park. In 1993, this was estimated to be 40% of the world population of musk oxen. Other mammals include Arctic fox, stoat, collared lemming, Arctic hare and a small but important population of Greenland wolf. Other marine mammals include ringed seal, bearded seal, harp seal and hooded seal as well as narwhal and beluga whale.

Species of birds which breed in the park include great northern diver, barnacle goose, pink-footed goose, common eider, king eider, gyrfalcon, snowy owl, sanderling, ptarmigan and raven.

== See also ==
- Lists of national parks
- List of largest protected areas
- Demographics of Greenland
- Nanok
