= Finn Devold =

Norwegian Arctic explorer, marine biologist and meteorologist

- Born: 24 April 1902; Bergen, Norway
- Died: 26 May 1977 (aged 75); Bergen, Norway
- Occupations: Polar explorer, marine biologist, meteorologist
- Known for: Herring fisheries studies
- Spouse: Karen Elisabeth Jenssen (1897–1983)
- Awards: Knight of the Order of St. Olav, 1954; Grand Knight of the Order of the Falcon (Iceland); Hans Strøm Medal of the Norwegian Fisheries Promotion Company; Oscar Sund Prize

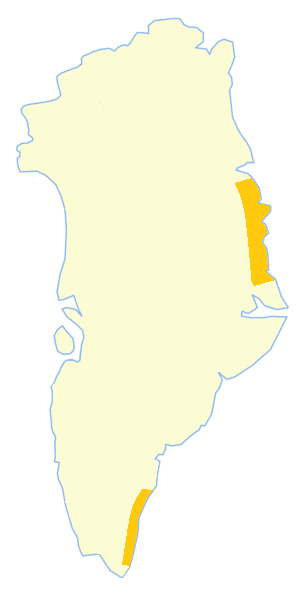
Territories of Eastern Greenland claimed by Norway until the 1933 Permanent Court of International Justice resolution. Finn Devold led the proclamation from Finnsbu in the southeastern area.

Finn Devold (born 24 April 1902 in Bergen, died 26 May 1977) was a Norwegian Arctic explorer, marine biologist and meteorologist. His father was parish priest Harald Ophus Devold. Together with his brother Hallvard Devold, Finn shared an interest in the Arctic areas and the expansion of Norwegian sovereignty across Greenland.

== Biography ==
Finn first traveled to the Arctic in 1923, interrupting his earlier scientific studies in Norway. He worked with his brother Hallvard at the Kvadehuken meteorology station in Svalbard, established in 1920 by the Geophysical Institute of Tromsø. While there, he took part in a rescue operation of two English airmen whose aircraft had crash-landed nearby. In October 1924, the Kvadehuken facility was closed for financial reasons, and less than two years later, he and his brother moved to the meteorological station in Jan Mayen. In 1927, Finn measured the elevation of Beerenberg, a volcano that is the island's highest point. After leaving Jan Mayen in 1928, Finn traveled to northeastern Greenland with his brother, a leader of the "Greenland case" (Grønlandssaken), a movement that sought to bring large swathes of East Greenland under Norwegian sovereignty. During that time (1927–28), he became Fridtjof Nansen's assistant.

=== Norwegian Claims in East Greenland ===
Finn actively participated in the 1931–33 Norwegian territorial claim movement in Greenland led from Myggbukta Station, where his brother led expeditions undertaken with the station as a base. By 1932, about 80 cabins manned by Norwegian trappers and fishermen had been built in different areas of East Greenland, including some in the distant King Frederick VI Coast and Storfjord Station in the Kangerlussuaq Fjord in between. Finn Devold led the actions in southeastern Greenland, where he had established the Finnsbu radio station.

12 July 1932, the Norwegian flag was raised at Myggbukta in the northeastern claim of Norway, where Helge Ingstad was named governor. At the same time, Finn Devold was asked to raise the flag at Finnsbu in Southeast Greenland. Denmark protested and brought the case to the Permanent Court of International Justice in The Hague. Following the 1933 resolution of the court awarding Greenland to the Danish government, Norway's claims in Greenland were given up, and most Norwegian outposts were closed.

Finn left Greenland on the relief ship Signalhorn, which evacuated the stations' staff in the Storfjord and Finnsbu areas and brought them back to Norway in August 1933. Even then, some stations, such as Jonsbu at the northern end and Torgilsbu at the southern, continued operation under Danish jurisdiction and restrictions for a few years.

=== Later life ===
In 1936, Finn was hired by the Norwegian Institute of Marine Research. He left involvement in politics and concentrated on his studies, obtaining a degree in mathematics and science in 1940. In 1943, he became a fisheries consultant at the institute. He specialized in Atlantic herring fisheries, and in 1950, he followed herring migrations on the new vessel "GO Sars." Finn carefully surveyed Atlantic herring's migration patterns before winter herring fishing. He published some of the results of his research in the Norwegian press, and in time his work became internationally recognized. Towards the end of his career, Finn became concerned about herring overfishing, that led to the depletion of Norwegian spring-spawning herring populations after the 1960s. Although he retired in 1972, Finn Devold continued his research on herring fisheries. He died in Bergen in 1977.

== Works ==
- The North Atlantic halibut and net fishing, Bergen 1938
- Contribution to the flounder surveys (Pleuronectes platessa Lin.), Ed., UiO, 1940
- From the Crimean War to our days. Part 1 (including NP Vigeland), vol. 3 in Norway at sea, 1953
- The life history of the Atlanto-Scandian Herring, Rapp. Cons. Explor Mer, 154, Copenhagen 1963, pp. 98–108
- The formation and disappearance of a stock unit of Norwegian herring, the Directorate of Fisheries, Skr. Marine Surveys 15 No. 1, Bergen 1968

=== Unpublished paper ===
- Devold's diary records from the wintering in Southeast Greenland 1931/32 and about wildlife near the Finnsbu radio station in the same area are kept at the Norwegian Polar Institute, Tromsø.

== See also ==
- Erik the Red's Land
- Fridtjof Nansen Land
- Norwegian Institute of Marine Research
- Sustainable fishery
