= Hallvard Devold =

Norwegian Arctic explorer, trapper and meteorologist

- Born: 8 November 1898; Tysfjord, Norway
- Died: 10 September 1957 (aged 58); Karmøy, Norway
- Occupations: Polar explorer, trapper, meteorologist
- Known for: Vision to expand Norwegian sovereignty to East Greenland

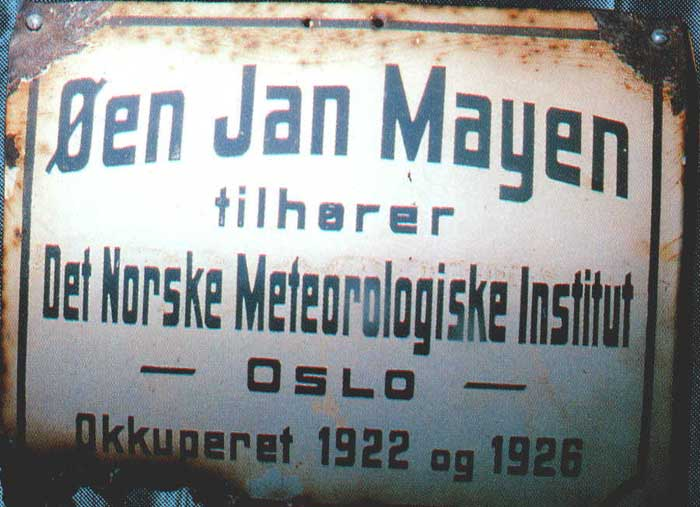
One of the signs placed by Hallvard Devold in Jan Mayen

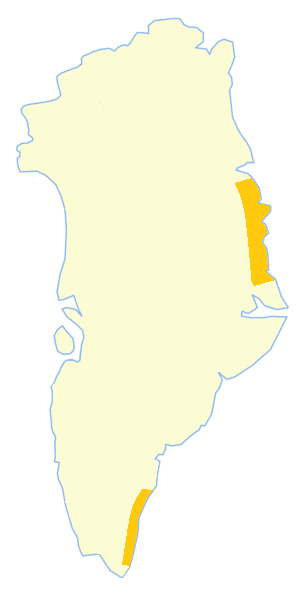
Territories of Eastern Greenland claimed by Norway until the 1933 Permanent Court of International Justice resolution.

Hallvard Ophuus Devold (8 November 1898 – 10 September 1957) was a Norwegian Arctic explorer, trapper and meteorologist. He was instrumental in the attempt to establish Eric the Red's Land in 1931. His brother Finn Devold (1902–1977) shared his vision and helped to establish a Norwegian station at Finnsbu, SE Greenland.

== Biography ==
Hallvard graduated from the University of Oslo in 1920. He worked as a meteorological assistant at the Haldde Observatory in Alta until 1922. He went for the first time to the Arctic in the summer of 1922 as a coal mining technician in Svalbard.

On the following winter he took a radio telegraphy course, and in the spring of 1923 he was hired as a meteorology assistant and radio telegraphist at the Kvadehuken station in Brøggerhalvøya by the director of the Geophysical Institute, along with his brother Finn Devold. Hallvard Devold remained on Kvadehuken until October 1924, when the station was wrapped up for financial reasons.

Between 1925 and 1926 Hallvard was the head of the Norwegian radio and weather station at Jan Mayen, which was manned by three Norwegians, not including him. The island was considered no man's land at the time and the League of Nations had given Norway jurisdiction over the island. Hallvard decided to call for its annexation on behalf of the Norwegian Meteorological Institute. He placed several signs around the island which read: "Property of the Norwegian Meteorological Institute". By this action the foundation was laid for the acknowledgment of Norway's right to the island of Jan Mayen in 1928. The island came under the sovereignty of Norway by royal decree of 8 May 1929 and finally became officially part of the Norwegian Kingdom on 27 February 1930.

Together with geologist Adolf Hoel and jurist Gustav Smedal, Hallvard became one of the main leaders of the "Greenland case" (Grønlandssaken) that tried to bring large swathes of East Greenland under Norwegian sovereignty. With Hallvard's inspiration, based on his experiences in Svalbard and Jan Mayen, the movement began to build a network of Norwegian trapping stations, combined with surveys and explorations of the almost uninhabited area. By 1929 the Norges Svalbard og Ishavsundersøkelser (NSIU) —"Norwegian Svalbard and Arctic Ocean Survey", established by Hoel in 1928, sent well-organized research expeditions to East Greenland. Expedition vessels also supplied the trapping stations with equipment financed by the Arctic Trading Co. (Arktisk Næringsdrift), a company that Hallvard had helped to set up and was the CEO of.

In the period between 1926 and 1933 Hallvard wintered in Northeast Greenland for six years, mostly in Myggbukta Station, where he was a meteorology assistant, radio telegraphist and leader of expeditions that were undertaken with the station as a base. By 1932 about 80 cabins manned by Norwegian trappers and fishermen were built in different areas of East Greenland, including some in the distant King Frederick VI Coast and Storfjord Station in the Kangerlussuaq Fjord. In 1932 Norway staked sovereignty claims in areas of Northeast and Southeast Greenland where Norwegian stations had been built. The Norwegian flag was raised at Myggbukta and Finnsbu by Devold and his men, and Helge Ingstad was named governor and Devold had Police jurisdiction until Ingstad arrived. Denmark protested and brought the case to the Permanent Court of International Justice in The Hague. Following the 1933 resolution of the court awarding Greenland to the Danish government, Norway's claims in Greenland were given up and most Norwegian outposts were closed. However some of the stations, such as Myggbukta and Torgilsbu continued operation for a few years under Danish jurisdiction and restrictions.

After leaving Greenland, Hallvard travelled to Antarctica in 1933, where he took part in the expedition of Captain Hjalmar Riiser-Larsen, together with renowned skier Olav Kjelbotn, who had formerly shared East Greenland experiences with him. The expedition attempted the exploration of the Princess Ragnhild Coast by dog sled. The venture, however, was a failure and ended dramatically when all their supplies and sled dogs were unloaded on an ice floe that broke up almost immediately and began to drift.

At the time of World War II Hallvard volunteered for military service in the spring of 1940 and took part in the Battle of Narvik as an Allied soldier of the Foreign Legion in French uniform, but partly under Norwegian command. For this he received The French Second World War Commemorative Medal.

Between 1951 and 1957 he was involved in Norwegian fisheries, as head of the herring smoking plant at Gofarnes, north of Kopervik, exporting Norwegian smoked herring to a number of countries. He died in 1957 and was buried in the Kopervik Church graveyard in Karmøy, Rogaland.

== Works and honours ==
- Hallvard Devold is the author of the book Polarliv (Polar Life), published in Gyldendal in 1940.
- Devold Peak and Devoldkalven in Antarctica are named after him.

== See also ==
- Arctic Trading Co.
- Erik the Red's Land
