= Finnsbu =

- Location within Greenland
- Coordinates: 63°22′48″N 41°18′0″W
- State: Denmark
- Constituent country: Greenland
- Municipality: Sermersooq
- Built /abandoned: 1931 - 1933

Population (2019)
  - Total: 0
- Time zone: UTC-01

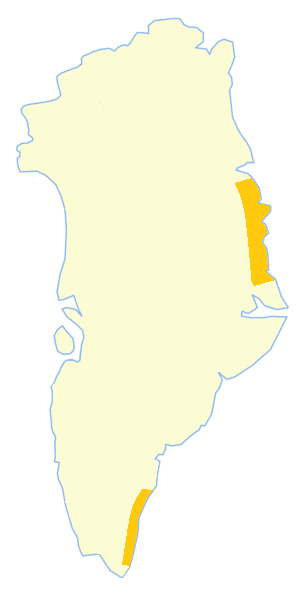
Territories of Eastern Greenland claimed by Norway until the 1933 Permanent Court of International Justice resolution.

Finnsbu was a Norwegian hunting, meteorological and radio station (Finnsbu Radio/LMX) located on the King Frederick VI Coast, Southeastern Greenland.

Administratively the area were the hut stood belongs now to the Sermersooq municipality.

The station was located on the shore of Graah Fjord, in the much indented coast of southern Thorland. Finnsbu was part of a sovereignty claims staked by Norway in Southeast Greenland between 60°30'N —just north of Nanuuseq, and 63°40'N —just south of Odinland.

== History ==
In 1931 Norway sent two expeditions to establish hunting, meteorological and radio stations in Southeast Greenland. Finn Devold (1902 - 1977), Hallvard Devold's brother, on ship Heimen from Tromsø, led the bigger party of six hunters to establish a Norwegian station. Initially Devold went to Timmiarmiut Fjord, but then he moved north to Skjoldungen District and built the hut by a good harbor in southern Thorland, naming it Finnsbu after his own name. Devold's team built two other main stations, as well as a number of smaller huts in the same region.

The other expedition, led by Ole Mortensen, went initially to Storfjord (Kangerlussuaq Fjord) on ship Signalhorn and built a hut there. Since hunting there was poor, Mortensen moved with his men south to Lindenow Fjord, where a station named Moreton was built which was later moved by Gunnar Horn to neighboring Nanuuseq Fjord and renamed Torgilsbu.

On 12 July 1932 Devold was required by the Norwegian government to formally hoist the Norwegian flag at Finnsbu. An expedition sent by the government led by Gunnar Horn on ship Veslemari visited Finnsbu on 17 August the same year. Together with Torgilsbu further south, Finnsbu became part of the Norwegian contribution to the International Polar Year 1932–33. In July 1933 Finnsbu station sent meteorological data to the Decennial Air Cruise squadron of Italian seaplanes led by Italo Balbo.

Following the 1933 resolution of the Permanent Court of International Justice rejecting Norway's claims in Greenland Finnsbu was abandoned. Relief ship Signalhorn evacuated the staff of the stations in the Storfjord and Skjoldungen area and brought them back to Norway in August 1933. Torgilsbu, however, remained in operation until 1940.

Currently there is a tide gauge in the location of the former Norwegian settlement.

== Bibliography ==
- Spencer Apollonio, Lands That Hold One Spellbound: A Story of East Greenland, 2008

== See also ==
- Erik the Red's Land
