= List of possessions of Norway =

Norwegian overseas territories and dependencies

This is a list of current and former territorial possessions of the Kingdom of Norway.

== Current overseas territories ==
Integral areas of Norway which are unincorporated:

- Svalbard (including Bear Island), in the Arctic, a part of Norway since 1920.
- Jan Mayen, in the Arctic, a part of Norway since 1929.

Svalbard with Bear Island are subject to the provisions of the Svalbard Treaty. Svalbard and Jan Mayen are sometimes grouped together for some categorization purposes.

Current dependencies of Norway are all in the southern polar region:

- Peter I Island, in the Antarctic and Southern Ocean, possession since 1929.
- Bouvet Island, in the sub-Antarctic and South Atlantic Ocean, possession since 1930.
- Queen Maud Land, in Antarctica, possession since 1939.

=== Map ===
Location of Norway and its overseas territories

=== Photo gallery ===
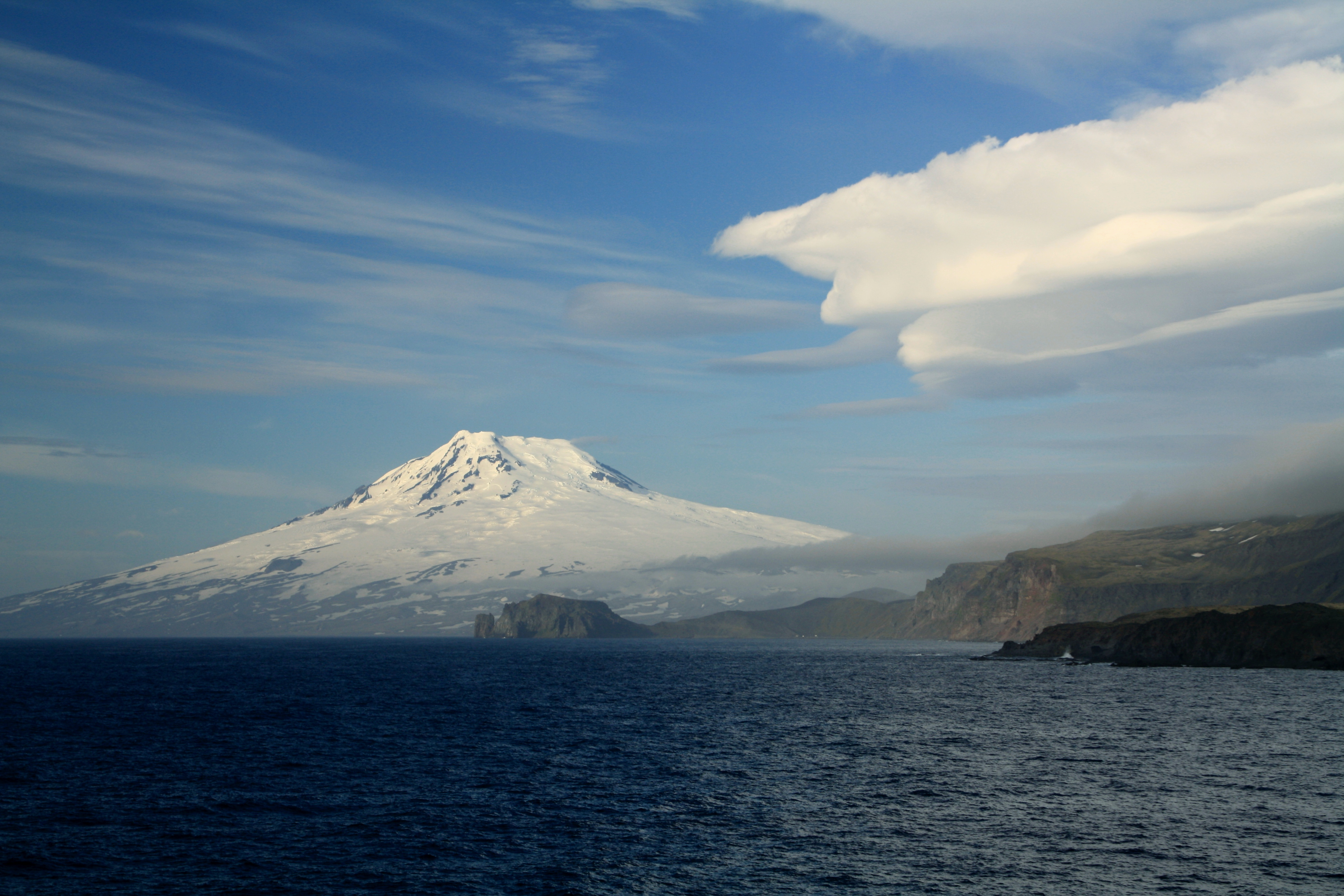
Jan Mayen with Beerenberg volcano

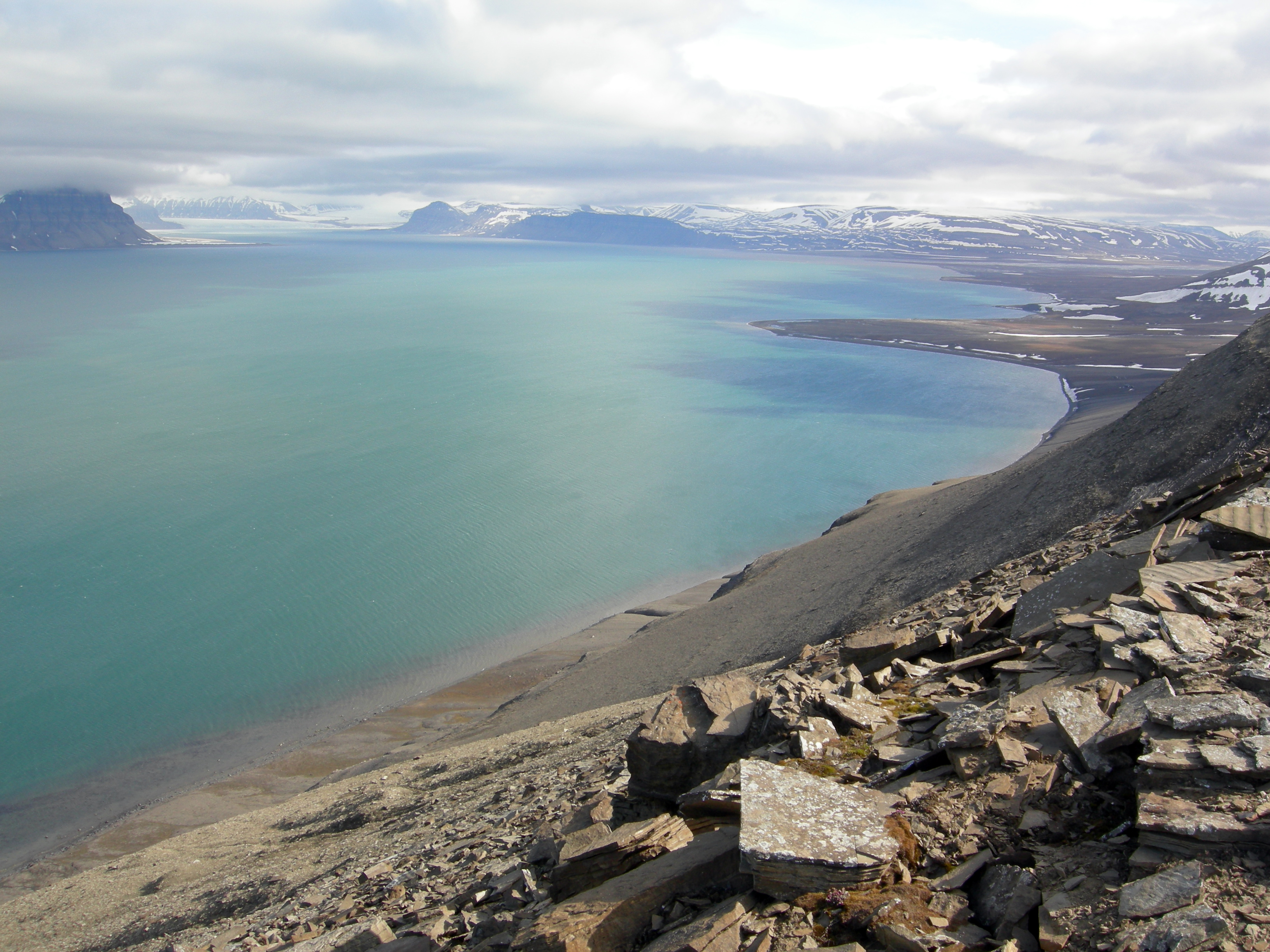
Isfjorden, Svalbard

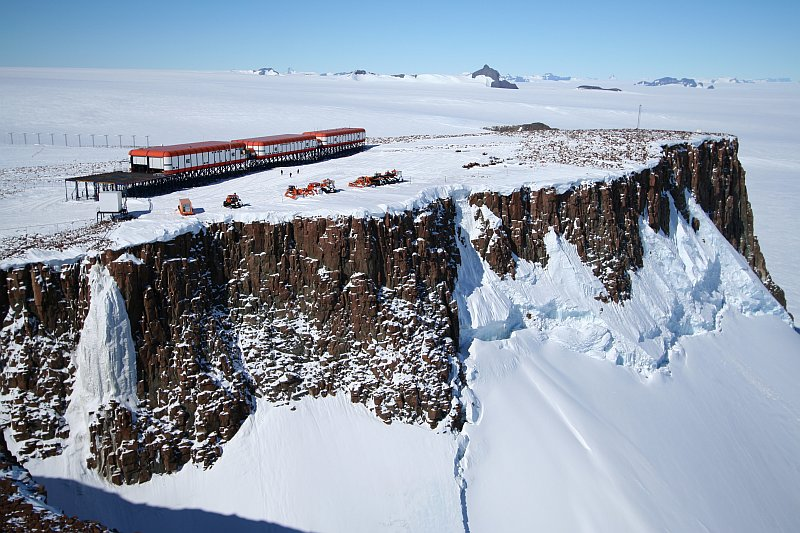
Vesleskarvet, Queen Maud Land

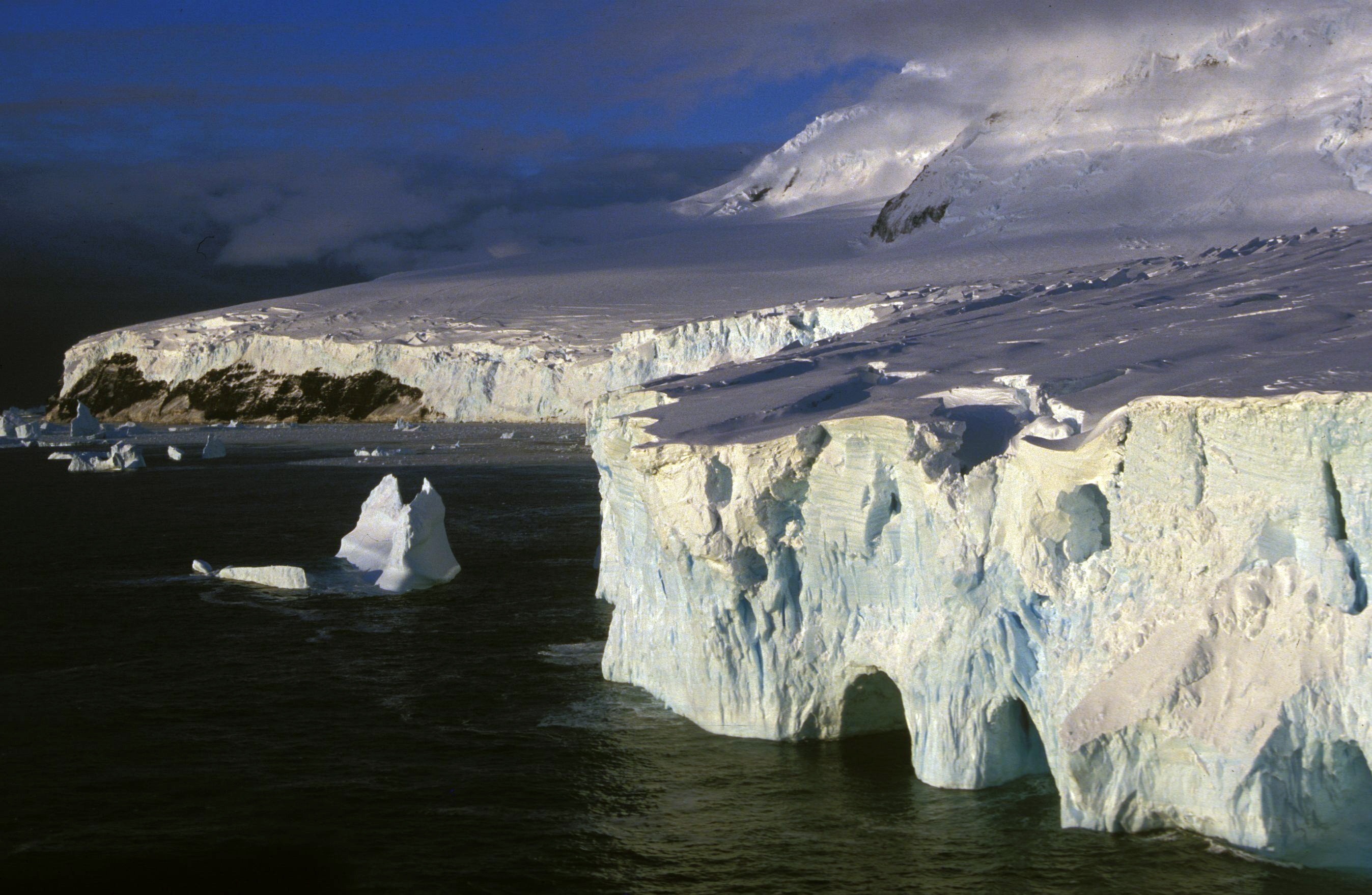
Peter I Island

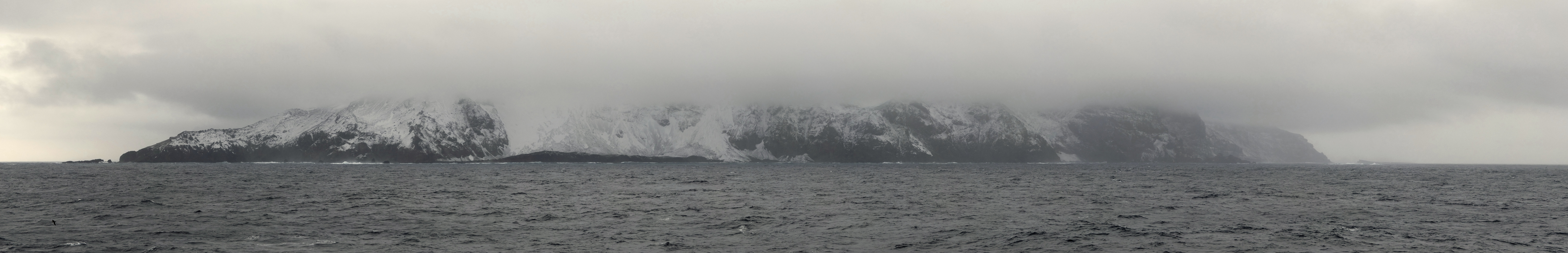
Bouvet Island

== Former dependencies and homelands ==
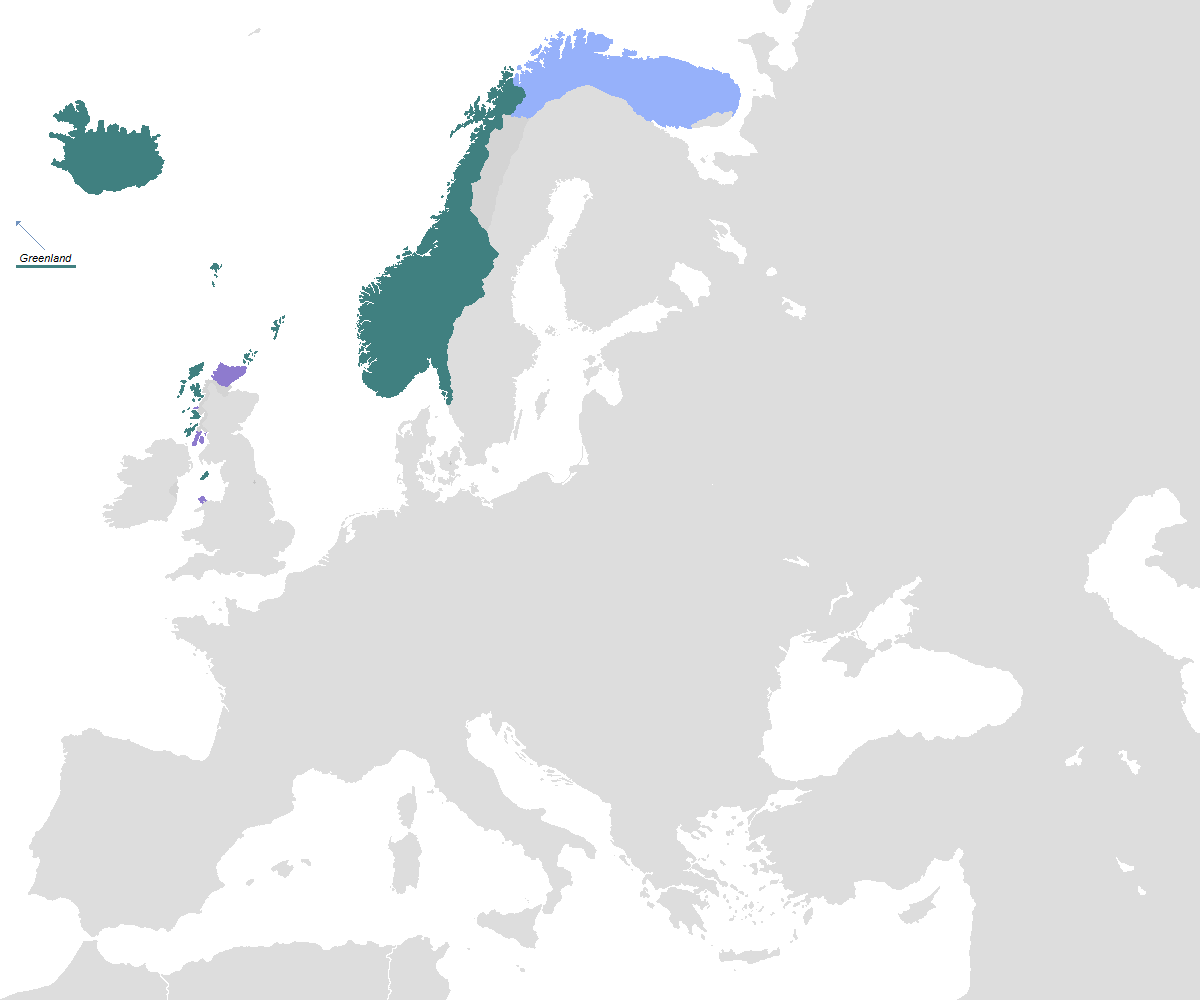
Kingdom of Norway (872–1397) with its homeland, dependencies and possessions

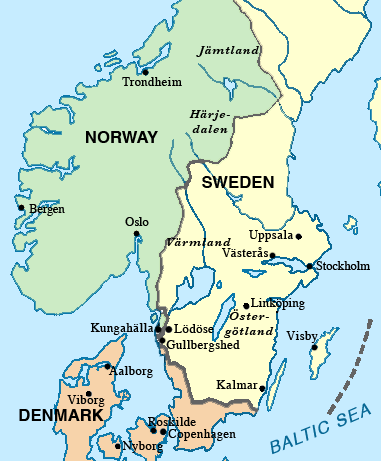
Norwegian Kingdom and its former homeland before 1645

The so-called Greater Norway includes these entities:

=== Dependencies ceded to Scotland (1st phase) ===
- Hebrides, colonized from 700s to 1100s, part of an earldom, crown dependencies from 1100s to 1266, ceded by the Treaty of Perth.
- Man, colonized from 850s to 1152, part of an earldom, crown dependency from 1152 to 1266, ceded by the Treaty of Perth.
- Orkney, colonized from 800s to 875, earldom from 875 to 1100s, crown dependency from 1194 to 1470, pledged by Christian I.
- Shetland, colonized from 700s to 900s, earldom from 900s to 1195, crown dependency from 1195 to 1470, pledged by Christian I.

==== Vassals ====
- Caithness and Sutherland overlordship from to 1266.

=== National homelands ceded to Sweden (2nd phase) ===
- Bohuslän, integrated from 800s to 1523, again from 1532 to 1658, ceded by the Treaty of Roskilde.
- Idre and Särna, integrated from 800s to 1645, ceded by the Second Treaty of Brömsebro, border not formally delineated until 1751.
- Jämtland, integrated from 1100s to 1645, ceded the Second Treaty of Brömsebro.
- Härjedalen, integrated from 1200s to 1563, again from 1570 to 1645, ceded by the Second Treaty of Brömsebro.

=== Dependencies ceded to Denmark (3rd phase) ===
- Faroe Islands, settled and colonized pre-1035 and crown dependencies from 1035 to 1814, ceded by the Treaty of Kiel.
- Greenland, colonized pre-1261 and crown dependency from 1261 to 1814, ceded by the Treaty of Kiel.
- Iceland, settled and colonized pre-1262 and crown dependencies from 1262 to 1814, ceded by the Treaty of Kiel of 1814.

The actual time of cession of the islands is somewhat disputed. Some claim it took place with the Union of Denmark and Norway in 1536/37, as the possessions of the Norwegian crown were claimed by the Oldenburg king. Nevertheless, they were still referred to as "dependencies of Norway" in later official documents. Also the Treaty of Kiel states: "...and provinces, constituting the kingdom of Norway, [..], together with their dependencies (Greenland, the Faroe Isles, and Iceland, excepted); [...] shall belong in full and sovereign property to the King of Sweden,...", clearly indicating that they were until 1814 regarded as a part of Norway.

==== Eastern Greenland Case ====
- Erik the Red's Land, northeast coast of Greenland, claimed (June 27) and annexed (July 10) from 1931 until awarded to Denmark by a court decision in 1933.
- Fridtjof Nansen Land, southeast coast of Greenland, claimed from (July 12, 1932) and occupied until (April 5, 1933), also awarded to Denmark by a court decision in 1933.

=== Briefly-ruled areas ===
==== Swedish homelands ====
- Värmland, from as early as 820s (pre-unification) to about 1000, before being integrated into Sweden.
- Dalsland, from as early as 820s (pre-unification) to about 1000, before being integrated into Sweden.

==== Welsh homeland ====
- Anglesey, crown dependency from 1098 to 1099, reverted to Kingdom of Gwynedd as of lack of settlements.

==== Danish homelands ====
- Kungsbacka, Varberg and Falkenberg, historical Northern Halland, part of the kingdom from 1287 to 1305.

== Suzerainties – Dublin and Mann ==
- Mann and the Isles, under Norwegian suzerainty.
- Kingdom of Dublin, nominally under Norwegian suzerainty.

== Former territorial claims ==
- Northumbria, settled c. 902 and first ruled c. 918 by Manx king Ragnall ua Ímair of the Norse-Gaels in exile from Dublin and held intermittently by Eric I of Norway as King of Northumbria 947–948 and 952–954, after securing his lordship over the Jarls of Orkney, in the precedent set by his father Harald Fairhair, part of which is famously attested to by Egil's Saga, set partly in Eric's court at King's Square in Scandinavian York. Title Earl of Northumbria (effectively Earl of York) 1016–1023, granted by Cnut the Great, King of Norway, to Eiríkr Hákonarson, Governor of Norway and one of the Jarls of Lade. Last controlled by Harald Hardrada through his vassal Tostig Godwinson, Earl of Northumbria and forefather of Birkebeiner Inge II of Norway, until the Battle of Stamford Bridge in 1066. Eystein II raided Hartlepool and Whitby in the 1150s, but it's not known whether he invoked his claim to rule Northumbria as pretext. St Olave's Church, York was mausoleum for the Earl of Northumbria. Within the former realm of Northumbria is the general region where most Norwegian place names and surnames, including Thwaite (placename element), are extant in present day England. Norwegian settlement and rule in Northumbria is illustrated by David Woodroffe in The Penguin Atlas of Medieval History (1961) by Colin McEvedy and illustrated by Ralph Orme in The Penguin Historical Atlas of the Vikings (1995) by John Haywood (British historian).
- The Kingdom of England, now part of the United Kingdom, claimed by several Norwegian kings (Hardrada dynasty) in the 11th century.
- The Kingdom of Denmark, claimed by several Norwegian kings (Hardrada dynasty) in the 11th century.
- South Georgia, now part of the British Overseas Territories of United Kingdom.
  The spread of Norwegian whaling industry to Antarctica in the early 20th century motivated Norway, right after its independence from the United Kingdoms of Sweden and Norway in 1905, to pursue territorial expansion not only in the Arctic claiming Jan Mayen and Sverdrup Islands, but also in Antarctica. Norway claimed Bouvet Island and looked further south, formally inquiring with Foreign Office about the international status of the area between 45° and 65° south latitude and 35° and 80° west longitude. Following a second such diplomatic démarche by the Norwegian Government dated 4 March 1907, Britain replied that the areas were British based on discoveries made in the first half of the 19th century, and issued the 1908 Letters Patent incorporating the British Falkland Islands Dependencies with a permanent local administration in Grytviken established in 1909.
- Fridtjof Nansen Land (Franz Josef Land), now part of Russia, claimed from 1926 to around 1929, rejecting a claim of the Soviet Union.
- Sverdrup Islands, now part of Canada, claimed from 1902 until Canadian sovereignty recognised in 1930, as part of an agreement with the British Empire, for the British to recognise Jan Mayen as Norwegian territory.
- Erik the Red's Land, northeast coast of Greenland and Fridtjof Nansen Land, southeast coast of Greenland, claimed and annexed from 1931 until awarded to Denmark by a court decision in 1933.
- Inari and Petsamo, now part of Finland and Russia, claimed from Finland from about 1942 to 1945 by the Quisling regime during the Nazi occupation of Norway.
- Murmansk and Arkhangelsk as Bjarmland, now part of Russia, claimed from the Soviet Union from about 1942 to 1945 by the Quisling regime, and was earlier also claimed by Norway in the High Middle Ages and Late Middle Ages. Quisling designated the area reserved for Norwegian colonization as Bjarmeland, a reference to the name featured in the Norse sagas for Northern Russia.

== Proposed African colony ==
In the aftermath of World War I, Fritz Wedel Jarlsberg attempted to acquire German East Africa as a colony or League of Nations mandate for Norway, citing Germany's obligation to reimburse Norway for its lost shipping in World War I. Jarlsberg proposed a Norwegian East African Chartered Company that could administer German East Africa under Norwegian sovereignty, using the colony to produce resources that could not be developed in Norway due to its climate, and to house Norwegian emigrants. Despite support from some British negotiators, Jarlsberg's proposal was rejected. German East Africa was instead divided between Belgium, Portugal, and the United Kingdom.

== See also ==
- Earldom of Orkney
- Icelandic Commonwealth
- Danish colonial empire for Dano–Norwegian colonies
- Irredentism
