= Lindenow Fjord =

Fjord in the King Frederick VI Coast, Greenland

- Kangerlussuatsiaq (Greenlandic)
- Location in Greenland
- Location: Greenland; Kingdom of Denmark
- Coordinates: 60°32′N 43°40′W
- Ocean/sea sources: North Atlantic Ocean
- Basin countries: Greenland
- Max. length: 64 km (40 mi)
- Max. width: 4 km (2.5 mi)
- Settlements: Moreton station, abandoned

Lindenow Fjord or Kangerlussuatsiaq, is a fjord in the King Frederick VI Coast, Kujalleq municipality, southern Greenland.

== History ==
Igdlukulik, an archaeological site with the ruins of a former Inuit settlement lies by the shore where the Nørrearm branches north.

The fjord is named after Godske Lindenov (d. 1612), admiral of the Danish Navy noted for his role in King Christian IV's expeditions to Greenland.

In 1931 Norway sent two expeditions to establish hunting and radio station in Southeast Greenland. Led by Ole Mortensen, one of the expeditions went to Kangerlussuaq Fjord on ship Signalhorn from Ålesund and built a hut there. Since hunting there was poor, Mortensen moved with his men to Lindenow Fjord, where a Norwegian radio and meteorological station named Moreton was built 7 km (4.3 mi) from the mouth of the fjord in 1932.

Following sovereignty claims by Norway under the official name Fridtjof Nansen Land on the southeast coast of Greenland between 60°30'N and 63°40'N in the same year, another expedition was sent by the Norwegian government led by Gunnar Horn. The station was moved to a better location further north to Nanuuseq Fjord and was named Torgilsbu, after Torgils Orrabeinfostre, a legendary Norseman who was shipwrecked in 1001 in the inhospitable Southeastern Greenland coast and spent four years trying to reach the Western Settlement. Subsequently seven smaller stations were established in the area around Torgilsbu.

Ole Mortensen gave assistance and hospitality to Gino Watkins and his two companions, Percy Lemon and Augustine Courtauld, during their open boat journey of 600 nautical miles (1,111 km) around the King Frederick VI Coast in 1931. Mortensen died in 1932 near the station when he fell through the ice of the fjord and was drowned.

== Geography ==
Lindenow Fjord

The Lindenow Fjord extends in an WNW/ESE direction for about 64 km. To the east the fjord opens into the North Atlantic Ocean south of Nanuuseq Fjord. Nanuuseq Island lies close to the northeast of the northern end of its mouth and larger Queen Louise Island at the southern end of its mouth.

The fjord branches at its head with a number of glaciers feeding its waters. The Nørrearm, its largest tributary fjord, has its mouth on the northern shore of Lindenow Fjord, about 22 km from the Lindenow Fjord's mouth. Apostelens fjord drains into the Nørrearm from the west. In 1999 Apostlens fjord was filled by the Apostlenes Glacier in its innermost 2.5 km. In 2012 the ice tongue onto the fjord had disappeared.

A little further west the Sønderarm, a smaller tributary fjord, branches southwards.

=== Mountains ===
The massive Tiningnertok (Apostelen Tommelfinger), a 2,291.48 m (7,518.0 ft) ultra-prominent peak, rises steeply at 60°35′54″N 43°49′13″W from the shore east of small Tininnertooq Bay on the northern side of the middle section of the Lindenow Fjord, west of the mouth of the Nørrearm. Akuliarusersuaq is another massive peak rising at 60°34′13″N 43°44′4″W to a height of 1,534.67 m (5,035.0 ft) 3 km to the southeast.

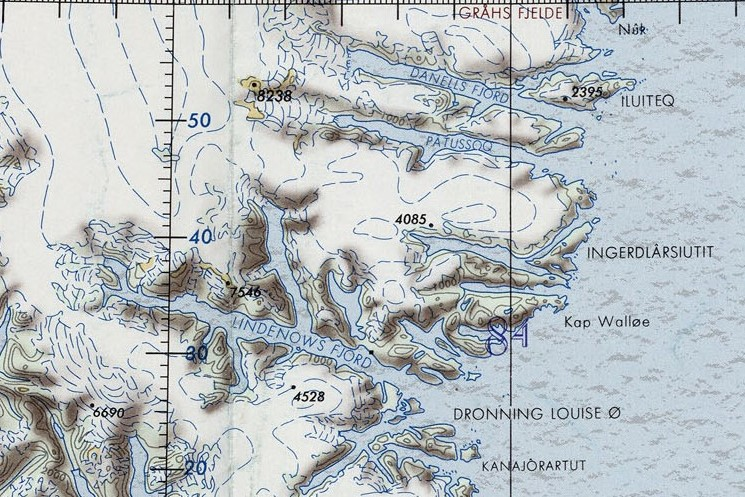
Map of Greenland section showing the Lindenow Fjord.

== See also ==
- List of fjords of Greenland
- List of Ultras of Greenland
