= Nualik =

Settlement in Greenland

Location within Greenland

Nualik was a settlement in eastern Greenland. It was located at approximately 67.25°N 33.366°W.

== History ==
During the 1898-1900 Carlsberg Fund Expedition to East Greenland, Georg Carl Amdrup landed at Nualik where he found a dwelling with the bodies of 38 dead Inuit.
