= Skaergaardite =

Mineral

General
- Category: Platinum group mineral
- Formula: PdCu
- IMA symbol: Skg
- Strunz classification: 1.AG.30
- Crystal system: Cubic
- Crystal class: Hexoctahedral (m3̅m); H-M symbol: (4/m 3̅ 2/m)
- Space group: Pm3m
- Unit cell: a = 3.0014(2) Å V = 27.0378 Å^{3}, Z = 1

Identification
- Color: Steel grey with a bronze tint
- Crystal habit: Occurs as droplets, equant grains with rounded outlines, subhedral to euhedral crystals, and as irregular grains that vary in size from 2 to 75 micrometers, averaging 22 micrometers.
- Tenacity: Sectile
- Mohs scale hardness: 4 to 5
- Luster: Metallic
- Streak: Black
- Diaphaneity: Opaque
- Specific gravity: 10.64
- Optical properties: Isotropic; no discernible internal reflections; color varying from bright creamy white to bright white.
- Pleochroism: Non-pleochroic
- Other characteristics: Typically found in composite microglobules in tholeitic gabbro.

Skaergaardite is an intermetallic platinum group mineral with the general chemical formula PdCu. The mineral is named after its discovery location: the Skaergaard intrusion, Kangerdlugssuaq area, East Greenland. The mineral name was approved by the International Mineralogical Association in 2003. The mineral has also been reported in the Duluth intrusion in Minnesota and the Rum layered intrusion in Scotland.

== Occurrence ==
Skaergaardite is associated with igneous intrusions containing well-preserved, oxide-rich, tholeiitic gabbro. It is found as inclusions in titanian magnetite, ilmenite, pyroxenes, and plagioclase. Skaergaardite can occur as an inclusion by itself, but is more commonly found in composite microglobule inclusions of copper iron sulfide minerals and other precious metal bearing minerals.

== Crystallography and symmetry ==
The crystallography of skaergaardite was determined using x-ray powder diffraction data. It has an isometric (cubic) crystal system and a hexoctahedral crystal class (Hermann–Mauguin notation: 4/m3̅2/m). Skaergaardite can appear in various forms including: droplets; cubic grains with rounded outlines; euhedral to subhedral grains; and irregular grains or aggregates.

== Optical properties ==
When viewed under a microscope in plane polarized light, skaergaardite appears to be bright creamy white (in the presence of bornite or chalcopyrite) or bright white (in the presence of digenite or chalcocite). When the mineral is rotated on the microscope stage its color does not change, indicating that it is non-pleochroic.

Under crossed polar light, skaergaardite appears completely dark no matter the direction the stage is rotated, indicating that the mineral is isotropic. As skaergaardite is isotropic, it is also non-birefringent.

== Importance ==
Skaergaardite contains palladium (Pd), one of the six platinum group metals (PGM) that are some of the rarest elements on earth. With the cost of palladium expected to increase as demand becomes greater, Skaergaardite could begin to be mined for its valuable palladium resources.

The Skaergaard intrusion is the only known source of skaergaardite large enough to be mined. Skaergaardite is the most common PGM mineral in the intrusion, making up over 90% of all the PGM observed. The most mineral-rich layer of the intrusion could contain over 1000 tons of skaergaardite. In addition to palladium: gold, platinum, and other precious metals have been found in the intrusion. Interest has been increasing for an underground mine in the Skaergaard intrusion. A pre-feasibility study is currently under way and is scheduled for completion by December 2011.
