= Nuussuaq (disambiguation) =

Nuussuaq may refer to the following areas in Greenland, from north to south:

- Nuussuaq Peninsula (Upernavik Archipelago), a peninsula in the northern part of the Upernavik Archipelago
- Nuussuaq, a settlement in the Upernavik Archipelago, located on the above peninsula
- Nuussuaq Peninsula, a large peninsula separating Disko Bay from Uummannaq Fjord
- Nuussuaq (district), a district of Nuuk, the capital of Greenland
- Nuussuaq, a mountain in Queen Louise Island, off the southeastern coast of Greenland
