= Kap Dalton =

Headland in Sermersooq, Greenland

Coordinates: 69°25′N 24°06′W

Location within Greenland

Kap Dalton is a cape in Østgrønland, eastern Greenland. Connected by a low isthmus to a mountainous peninsula, it is 7 miles (11 km) northeast of Kap Ewart. A small bay on Kap Dalton's north side allows for anchorage. On west part of this bay, still remains the rets of Amdrup settlement in 1900

== See also ==
- Kap Dalton Formation
