= Nanuuseq Fjord =

Fjord in Greenland

- Oyfjord
- Location
- Interactive map of Nanuuseq Fjord
- Location: Arctic
- Coordinates: 60°31′N 43°15′W
- Ocean/sea sources: North Atlantic Ocean
- Basin countries: Greenland
- Max. length: 14 km (8.7 mi)
- Max. width: 2 km (1.2 mi)
- Surface area: SE Greenland
- Settlements: Torgilsbu, abandoned

Nanuuseq Fjord, old spelling Nanûseq, is a fjord in the King Frederick VI Coast, Kujalleq municipality, southern Greenland.

== History ==
In 1931 Norway sent two expeditions to establish hunting and radio station in Southeast Greenland. Led by Ole Mortensen, one of the expeditions went to Kangerlussuaq Fjord on ship Signalhorn and built a hut there. Since hunting there was poor, Mortensen moved with his men to Lindenow Fjord, where a Norwegian radio and meteorological station named Moreton was built 7 km (4.3 mi) from the mouth of the fjord in 1932.

Following sovereignty claims by Norway on SE Greenland between 60°30'N and 63°40'N in the same year, another expedition was sent by the Norwegian government led by Gunnar Horn. The station was moved to a better location further north to Nanuuseq Fjord and was named Torgilsbu, after Torgils Orrabeinfostre, a legendary Norseman who was shipwrecked in 1001 and spent four years trying to reach the Western Settlement. Subsequently seven smaller stations were established in the area around Torgilsbu.

== Geography ==
Nanuuseq, formerly known as Oyfjord, is a short fjord lying between Nattoralik to the north and Lindenow Fjord to the south. It extends in a roughly east–west direction from its mouth in the North Atlantic Ocean for about 20 km until its head. Its entrance is on the northern side of Nanuuseq Island and there is another 5 km long and narrow island within the fjord itself close to its northern shore. Noret is a short tributary fjord branching northwards off the western end of the long island.

In the same manner as in the fjords further north, dark-hued mountains rise steeply from the shore on both sides. However, there are no glaciers reaching down to the waterline.

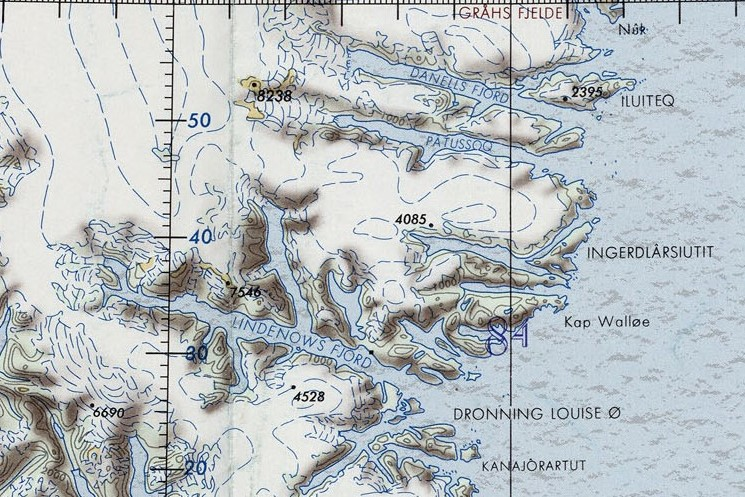
Map of Greenland section showing Nanuuseq Fjord.

== See also ==
- List of fjords of Greenland
