= Kvadehuken =

Headland in Spitsbergen, Svalbard

Kvadehuken Quade Hoek
- Cape
- Coordinates: 78°57′59″N 11°19′42″E
- Location: Oscar II Land, Spitsbergen

Kvadehuken is a cape at the northwestern corner of Brøggerhalvøya, located at the southwestern side of outlet of Kongsfjorden, in Oscar II Land on Spitsbergen, Svalbard. The name is a Norwegian spelling of Dutch: Quade hoek (bad corner).

The Norwegian geophysical station at Kvadehuken, a research facility, was established in 1920 by the Geophysical Institute of Tromsø. Brothers Hallvard and Finn Devold worked at the facility. In October 1924, the station was wrapped up for financial reasons.
