= Cape Dalton =

Cape Dalton (66°53′S 56°44′E) is a point marking the southeast end of a snow-covered island, located 1 nautical mile (2 km) north of Abrupt Point on the western side of Edward VIII Bay. It was first mapped by Norwegian cartographers from air photos taken by the Lars Christensen Expedition (1936–37) and, though not specifically named on the map, the point appears to have been included as part of two larger features called "Skutenes" and "Skutenesmulen." Skutenes (barge point) was subsequently mapped by Australian National Antarctic Research Expeditions (ANARE) as two snow-covered islands, making this descriptive name and Skutenesmulen, a derivative, inappropriate. ANARE named the point Cape Dalton for R.F.M. Dalton, officer in charge of ANARE work at Macquarie Island, 1953.
