= Adolf Hoel =

Norwegian geologist, environmentalist and Polar region researcher

Professor Adolf Hoel
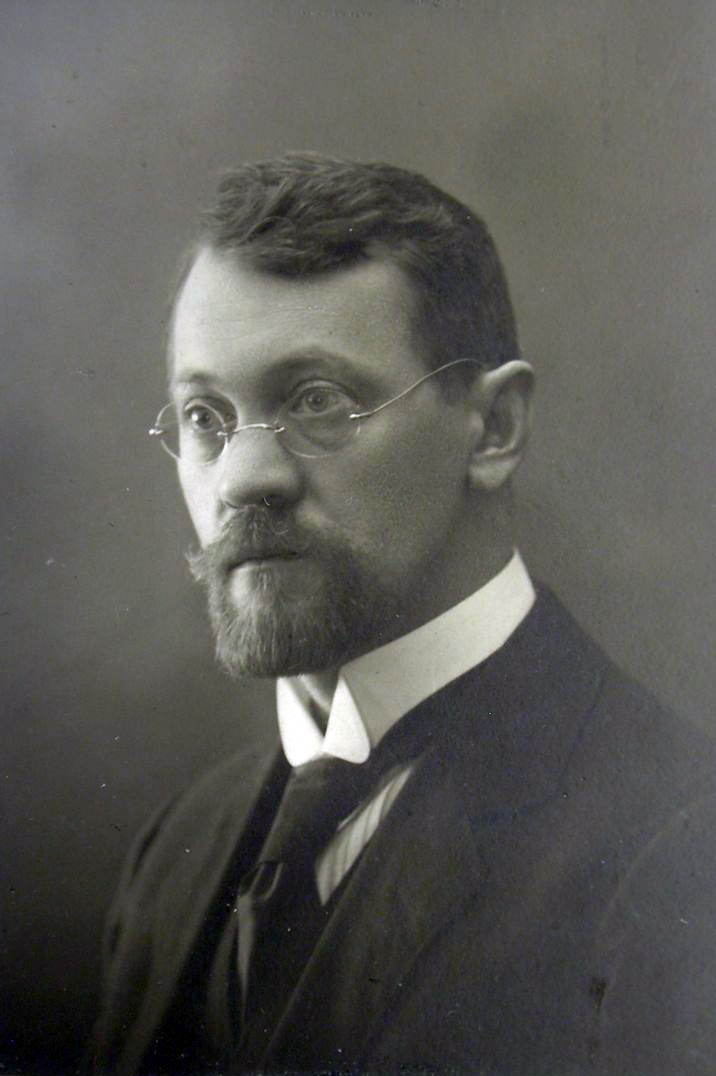
- Adolf Hoel (1911)

Rector of the University of Oslo
- In office 1941–1945
- Preceded by: Didrik Arup Seip
- Succeeded by: Otto Lous Mohr

Personal details
- Born: May 15, 1879
- Died: February 19, 1964 (aged 84)

Adolf Hoel (15 May 1879 – 19 February 1964) was a Norwegian geologist, environmentalist and Polar region researcher. He led several scientific expeditions to Svalbard and Greenland. Hoel has been described as one of the most iconic and influential figures in Norwegian polar exploration in the first half of the 20th century, alongside Fridtjof Nansen and Roald Amundsen. His focus on and research of the polar areas has been largely credited as the reason Norway has sovereignty over Svalbard and Queen Maud Land in the Antarctica.

Hoel was the founding director of the Norwegian Polar Institute and served as rector of the University of Oslo and as President of the Norwegian Society for the Conservation of Nature.

== Biography ==
Hoel was born in Sørum in Akershus, Norway. He attended Hans Nielsen Hauges Minde in Oslo and the University of Oslo taking his cand.real. examination in 1904. He married Elisabeth Birgitte Fredrikke Thomsen in 1916.

Beginning in 1909 Hoel took part in about 30 Norwegian government-sponsored expeditions to Arctic areas, becoming also the main driving force behind Norwegian scientific activities in East Greenland. Hoel became a fellow of the University of Oslo in 1911 and a docent in 1919. In the second half of the 1920s Hoel took up the cause of Norwegian claims in East Greenland. Together with Gustav Smedal, Hoel eventually became the main leader of the "Greenland cause" (Grønlandssaken) that tried to bring East Greenland under Norwegian sovereignty. Inspired by trapper Hallvard Devold the movement began to build a network of trapping stations, combined with surveying and exploring the almost uninhabited area. By 1929 the Norges Svalbard og Ishavsundersøkelser (NSIU) —"Norwegian Svalbard and Arctic Ocean Survey" established by Hoel in 1928, sent well-organized research expeditions to East Greenland. Expedition vessels also supplied the trapping stations with equipment financed by the Arctic Trading Co. (Arktisk Næringsdrift), a company that Hoel had helped to set up. The Norwegian claim to East Greenland was eventually rejected in 1933 by the Permanent Court of International Justice in Hague and the Norwegian occupation of the disputed areas was terminated.

In 1939, having learnt that Germany secretly intended to lay claim to parts of Antarctica, he notified the Norwegian authorities and gave the impetus to Norway's getting ahead of the German expedition and occupying Queen Maud's Land.

He was the leading Norwegian researcher at Svalbard in the early 20th century, and in 1948 the Norges Svalbard- og Ishavsundersøkelser, which he had founded, became the Norwegian Polar Institute. He was President of the Norwegian Society for the Conservation of Nature from 1935 to 1945.

In 1933, he became a member of the Nasjonal Samling party of the former minister of defence, Vidkun Quisling, largely due to the Norwegian nationalist approach to the Norwegian occupation of a part of Greenland in the early 1930s. Hoel was appointed professor of the University of Oslo in 1940 and was rector of the university from 1941 to 1945, during the German occupation of Norway. In this position, he inhibited an extreme Nazification of the university and helped arrested students. Nevertheless his collaboration with the German occupation authorities was seen as condemnable by university members who thought that the university should participate more actively in peaceful resistance against the occupation.

After the end of the occupation, on May 1945, Hoel was arrested and imprisoned at Grini until April 1946. He was tried for treason in May 1949 and was sentenced to 18 months in prison, with credit for time served. The main charges that he was convicted of were his membership in Nasjonal Samling and the fact that he had let the Nasjonal Samling authorities appoint him as rector of the university. He was stripped of all of his offices and positions, his professor title and was expelled from several organisations of which he had been a member. He was also deprived of the Order of Saint Olaf, which he had been awarded in 1938. After that, he lived a relatively reclusive life devoted to writing of monographs and articles. He also published a number of articles in different journals, both of scientific and political nature.

After World War II, he finished his work for the Norwegian Polar Institute on the history of Svalbard (Svalbard. Svalbards historie 1596-1965) which was published as a three-volume set after his death.

Adolf Hoel was run over by a car in Oslo in December 1963 and died of his injuries in a hospital on 19 February 1964.

== Honours ==
The mineral hoelite, the Adolf Hoel Glacier in Greenland and the Hoel Mountains in Antarctica are named in his honour.

Academic offices
Preceded by Didrik Arup Seip	Rectors of the University of Oslo; 1941–1945	Succeeded by Otto Lous Mohr
