= Abrupt Point =

Location in Antarctica

Abrupt Point (66°54′S 56°42′E), also known as Brattodden, is a rocky point 4.8 kilometres (3 mi) southwest of Patricia Islands, on the west side of Edward VIII Bay. Mapped by Norwegian cartographers from aerial photos taken by the Lars Christensen Expedition, 1936–37, and named Brattodden ("the abrupt point"). The Norwegian name was translated by ANCA following a 1954 ANARE (Australian National Antarctic Research Expeditions) survey of the area.
