= Kangerlussuaq Glacier =

Glacier in Greenland

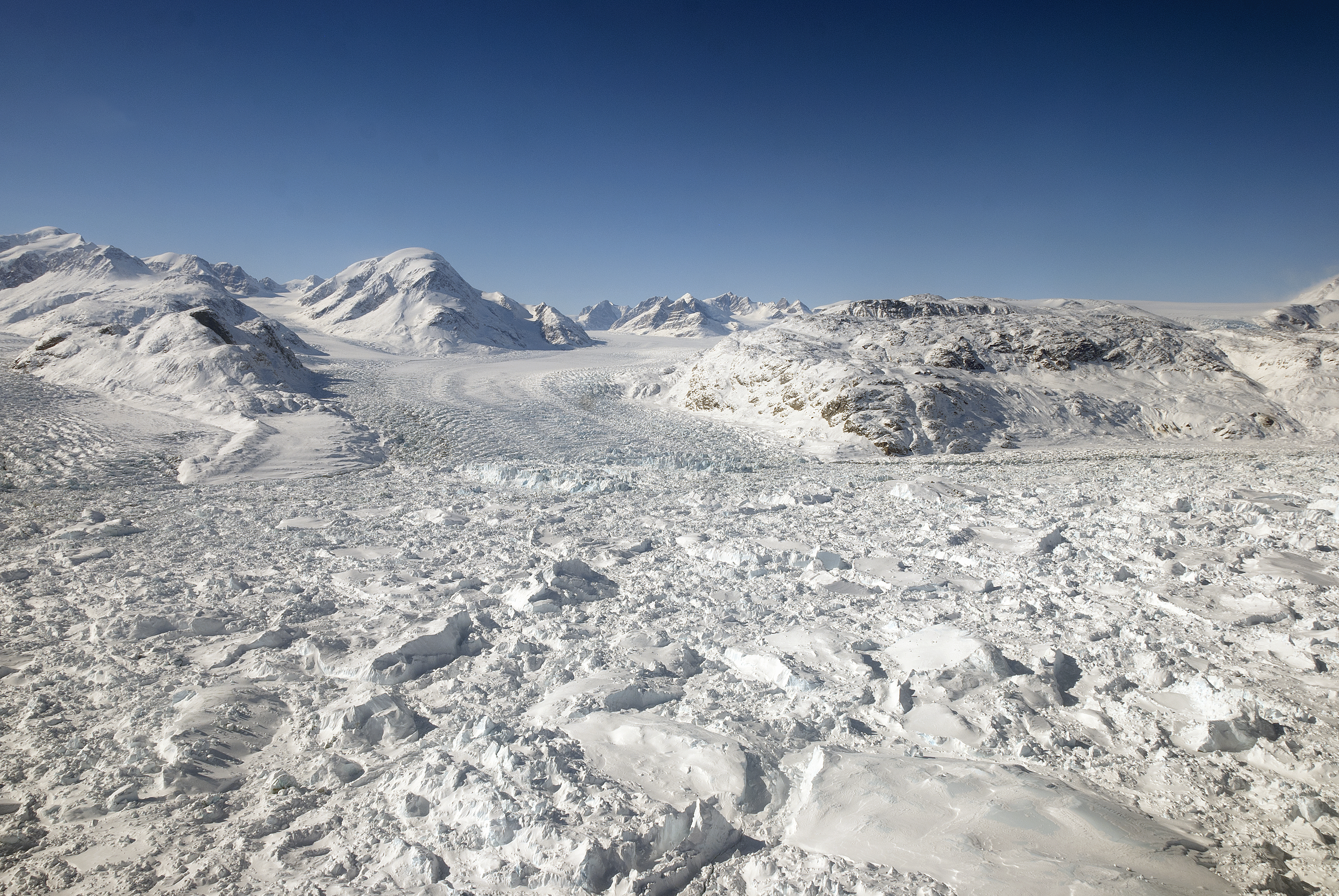
- Kangerlugssuaq Glacier

- Location within Greenland
- Location: Greenland
- Coordinates: 68°38′N 33°0′W
- Thickness: 3km
- Terminus: North Atlantic Ocean
- Status: retreating

Kangerlussuaq Glacier (Greenlandic: Kangerlussuaq, transl. large fjord; old spelling Kangerdlugssuaq) is the largest glacier on the southeast coast of the Greenland ice sheet, and one of its largest outlet glaciers. It was discovered in 1930.

The glacier is tidewater-terminating, with its front edges reaching all the way to the sea. It flows into the head of the Kangerlussuaq Fjord, the second largest fjord in East Greenland, with a 1km-high calving front.

Observations of the glacier have been made since 1932.

The glacier has a retrograde bed slope (a bed that deepens inland) that lies below sea level, making it potentially susceptible to Marine Ice Sheet Instability.

== Ice discharge ==
The Kangerlussuaq Glacier discharges around 24 Gt of ice per year into the ocean. This is about 5% of the Greenland ice sheet's total discharge. This glacier together with Helheim Glacier represents 35% of East Greenland's discharge.

Between 1900 and 2012, the Kangerlussuaq Glacier lost approximately 1400 Gt of ice, averaging around 12 Gt per year, including 158 Gt between 1972 and 2018. Between 2000 and 2012, the Kangerlussuaq discharged 105 Gt, which represented about 14% of the Greenland ice sheet's total discharge for the period.

This melting is not uniform, with no significant ice loss during the cold period in the 1960s and 1970s, and the glacier shrinking dramatically between 2004 and 2005, dumping twice as much ice into the sea. After the 2004–2005 event, ice discharge was at least 30% higher than before.

=== Future predictions ===
It is estimated that Kangerlussuaq Glacier could retreat significantly before 2100, potentially discharging up to 5 times more ice than it has in the past century.

== Extent ==
The Kangerlussuaq Glacier likely reached its maximum extent during the Little Ice Age in approximately 1450–1850.

In 1932–1933, the glacier experienced a 9km retreat, larger than any of its recent retreat events, after its ice tongue (the floating part of the glacier) collapsed. In the following decades, the glacier remained relatively stable before beginning to gradually retreat during the 1990s. It retreated by 5 km between April 2004 and April 2005, then advanced by ∼200m per year between 2008 and 2016. In 2016–2018, the glacier retreated approximately 5km, and, by 2018, the glacier had retreated further inland than at any time in the previous 80 years. However, in the winter of 2018–2019, the glacier began to advance again.

== Thinning ==
The glacier is approximately 3km thick.

Between the Little Ice Age and 1981, the glacier thinned by 230–260m. Between 2003 and 2007, the glacier thinned by over 100m.

== See also ==
- List of glaciers in Greenland
