= Georg Carl Amdrup =

Royal Danish Navy officer and explorer

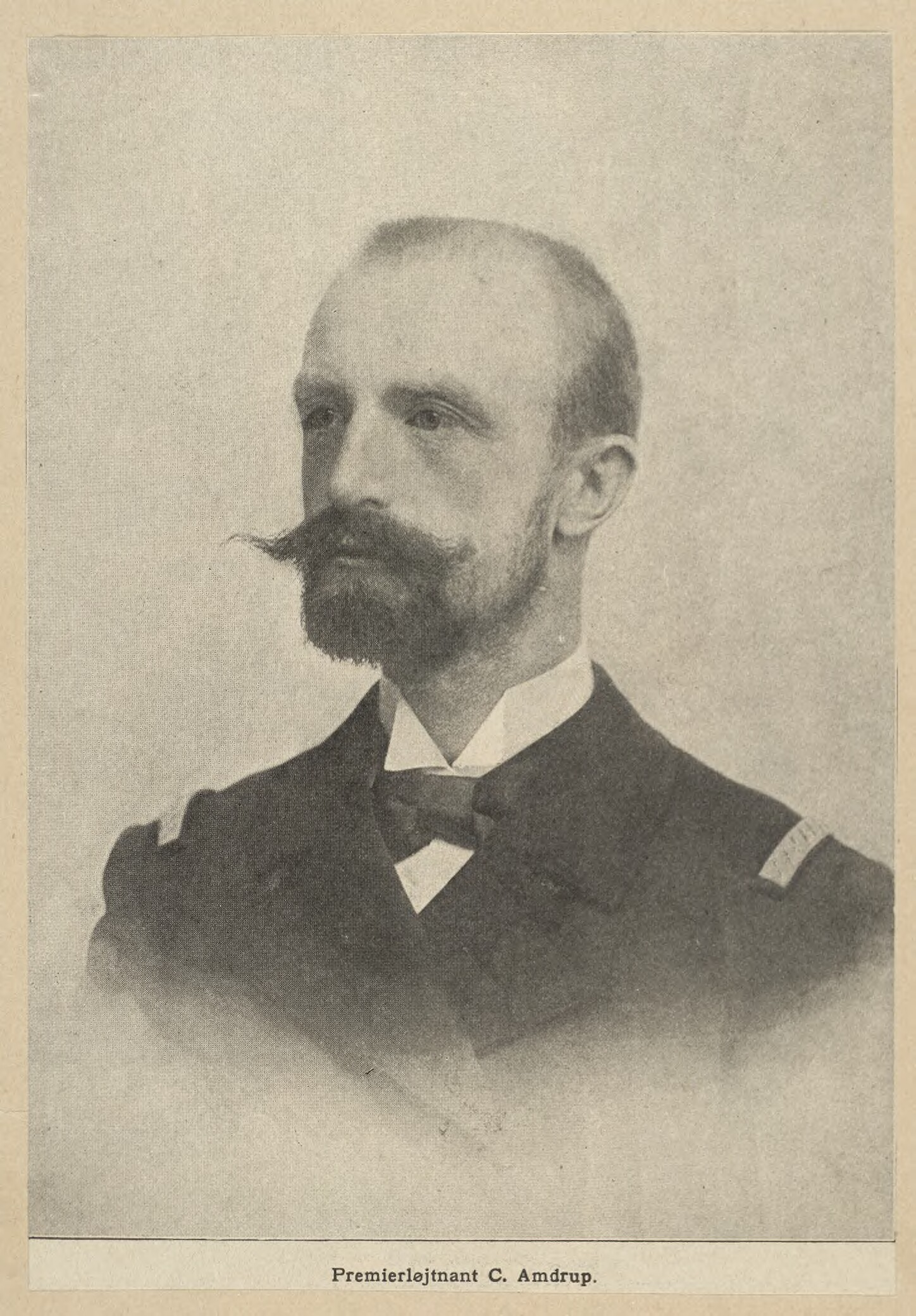
- George Carl Amdrup
- Born: November 19, 1866; Copenhagen, Denmark
- Died: January 15, 1947 (aged 80); Copenhagen, Denmark
- Military career
- Allegiance: Denmark
- Branch: Royal Danish Navy
- Rank: Vice-Admiral
- Awards: Grand Officer of the Order of Merit (Chile)

Vice-Admiral Sir Georg Carl Amdrup (November 19, 1866 – January 15, 1947) was a Royal Danish Navy officer and explorer.

== Career ==
In 1884, Amdrup, of the Royal Danish Navy, was sent to Amassalik. After wintering, he explored the coast to the north, including an examination of the Kangerlussuaq Fjord, known until then only from Inuit reports. He mapped a large length of coastline while collecting many geological and ethnological finds. By July 1885, he reached Aggas Island (67° 22' North), the furthest north of this survey.

=== Carlsbergfondet Expedition til Ost-Gronland ===
Lieutenant Amdrup was the leader of a major Danish expedition in 1898-1900, the Carlsberg Foundation Expedition to East Greenland (Carlsbergfondet Expedition til Ost-Gronland). With him were botanist Christian Krause, ornithologist Knud Poulsen, and the sailors, A. Jakobsen and Soren P. Nielsen. They left Copenhagen on August 16, 1898, sailing from Copenhagen in the vessel Godthaab, and reaching Amassalik ("Angmagssalik") on 31 August. The purpose of the expedition was to identify and examine the then completely unexplored stretch of coast between the 66th parallel north and Scoresbysund at about 70th parallel north. The following year, they traveled the coast north to 67° 22' North, establishing several depots to use for future travel north.

During this expedition, Amdrup found the remains of a small, extinct Eskimo settlement. From this find, he brought to Denmark in 1899 a significant ethnographic collection.

=== The East-Greenland Coast Expedition, 1900 ===
In 1899, Alfred Gabriel Nathorst sold the Antarctic to Amdrup. On June 15, 1900, Amdrup took an 11-man expedition to East Greenland. This expedition, which cartographer Johan Peter Koch joined, was also known as the 'Carlsberg Foundation Expedition'. The survey was to explore the coast between Cape Brewster and Aggas Island. They arrived at Little Pendulum Island, before continuing to Cape Dalton (69°25 N) in mid July where they divided into two parties. While the expedition's second in command, Nikolaj Hartz, stayed with the Antarctic and examined the country up to Scoresbysund and fjords to the north, Amdrup endured great hardship and dangers further south in a small boat Aggas that navigated through the ice belt in the polar stream and mapped an uncharted route.

During the 730 kilometres (450 mi) part of the expedition in Aggas, a 5.6 metres (18 ft) long, 1.4 metres (4 ft 7 in) wide open boat that carried Amdrup, three others including Ejnar Mikkelsen, plus 1,659 kilograms (3,657 lb) of supplies, Amdrup found a dwelling containing the remains of 38 bodies, from which he inferred that Inuit had been trying to colonize the area. Amdrup and his men were even accused of killing the 38 people, but it was later ascertained that they had starved to death. Having established the fact that there were no other Eskimos on the eastern side of the island other than are known to the Danish missionaries, Amdrup's skeleton find was unusual.

Amdrup and his men were picked up by the ship Antarctic at Amassalik in September and he returned to Denmark on October 4, with significant collections of botanical, geological, and zoological, specimens. Part of the natural history collection that Amdrup brought back included a live musk ox and ten lemming. He published the expedition results in the "Notice of Grønland", XXVII-XXIX. Swedish and English expeditions that were ongoing at the time did not report the considerable progress that the Danish expedition under Amdrup was able to show.

=== Danmark Expedition to Greenland's Northeast Coast, 1906-1908 ===
From 1905, Amdrup worked as an Adjutant to his friend, Prince Valdemar of Denmark. He was a member of the Committee for the Denmark expedition to Greenland's northeast coast 1906-1908, and, as the expedition historian, Amdrup wrote the expedition history in the "Notice of Grønland", XLI.

=== Later life ===
In 1913, he was appointed to the Greenland Commission, (1931: Commission for scientific studies in Greenland) of which he was chairman from 1930 until 1931. In 1937, he took over the publication of Meddelelser om Grønland. He was a member of the editorial board of "Grønland in tohundredåret for Hans Egede's Land". Amdrup was promoted to the rank of commander in 1916. In 1925, he was promoted to counter admiral in 1925, and was the Commander of the Niels Iuel. From 1927, he was Vice Admiral Sir Georg Amdrup.

== Awards and honors ==
At the winter 1900-01 meeting of the Royal Danish Geographical Society held in the Copenhagen Concert Hall, Amdrup was honored with a Medal of Merit in gold. He also received other medals from several foreign geographical societies, including the Royal Geographical Society in 1902, and the Royal Geographical Society's Back grant. In 1913, Mikkelsen dedicated his book, Being the story of the 'Alabama' expedition, 1909-1912 to Amdrup.

Amdrup Land (80.916°N 16.583°W) in northeastern Greenland was named after him by the Denmark expedition. Another landform named in his honor is Amdrup Fjord 68.216°N 32.333°W.

The Shipbuilding & Engineering Company's ship G.C. Amdrup is also named for him. Also named on his behalf is Leptognathia amdrupii, which was considered for transfer to the genus Chauliopleona by 2000 and transferred to Chauliopleona amdrupii by 2005.

== See also ==
- Cartographic expeditions to Greenland

== Selected works ==
- (1902). The East-Greenland Coast Expedition in the year 1900. Kjobenhavn, Geogr. Tids. 16, (34-54, with 1 map). (in Danish)
- (1904) Observations astronomiques, météorologiques et magnétiques de Tasiusak dans le district d'Angmagsalik, 1898 Faites par l'expédition danoise sous la direction de G. C. Amdrup: Publ. par la Commission danoise des Explorations géographique et géologiques du Groenland
- (1904) Fungi Groenlandiæ orientalis in expeditionibus G. Amdrup 1898-1902
- (1921). Grønland i Tohundredaaret for Hans Egedes Landing. Under Redaktion of G. C. Amdrup, Louis Bobé, Ad. S. Jensen, H. P. Steensby. [With plates.]. København, 1921. (in Danish)
- (1928). Greenland. Copenhagen: C.A. Reitzel.

== Bibliography ==
- "Georg Carl Amdrup", in Salmonsens Konversationsleksikon (2nd edition, 1915) (Danish language)
- "Georg Carl Amdrup", in Salmonsens Konversationsleksikon (2nd edition supplement, 1930) (Danish language)
