= Gustav Smedal =

Norwegian jurist and irredentist activist

- Born: 28 December 1888; Kristiania, Norway
- Died: 30 October 1951 (aged 62); Oslo
- Occupation: Jurist
- Known for: Vision to expand Norwegian sovereignty to East Greenland
- Father: Harald Smedal

Gustav Smedal (28 December 1888 – 30 October 1951) was a Norwegian jurist and irredentist activist.

== Biography ==
He was born in Kristiania to Prosecutor General and Minister Harald Smedal (1859–1911) and Caroline Kirkgaard Hofgaard (1863–89). He graduated from the Vestheim school and studied law, obtaining a degree in 1913. After completing his apprenticeship he was employed at the Ministry of Foreign Affairs between 1920 and 1923. In 1921–22, he became the secretary of the Norwegian delegation to the League of Nations in Geneva and private secretary of judge Frederik Beichmann. Between 1923 and 1931 Smedal ran a law office in Stavanger.

Smedal was known for his active support of the "Greenland case" (Grønlandssaken) led by Hallvard Devold, where Norway claimed parts of East Greenland. In 1931, a group of Norwegians living at certain hunting and radio stations in the area claimed a portion of East Greenland as Norwegian territory, naming it Erik the Red's Land. Denmark protested and brought the case to the Permanent Court of International Justice. Smedal was a member of the Norwegian delegation at the hearing of the court in The Hague in 1933. Following the Permanent Court of International Justice ruling in the disfavor of Norway, the official claims were abandoned, but Smedal continued his activism. He claimed that the Kiel Treaty was unfair to Norway.

A nationalist, Smedal would find himself collaborating with the national socialist regime during the German occupation of Norway. In 1942, he enrolled in Nasjonal Samling (at that time the only legal party), but never worked directly for the party. Wishing to create ties between Smedal and the party, the regime offered him positions as law professor, Supreme Court Justice and even Chief of the Supreme Court. Smedal, being economically independent, only accepted a position as honorary professor in 1943. Instead, he was active in the organization Norges Ishavskomité together with the other prominent leader of Norwegian claims in East Greenland and chairman of the Arctic Trading Co., Adolf Hoel.

Smedal published several articles and pamphlets to strengthen a Norwegian claim to Greenland, which in the meantime (1941) had been occupied by the United States. He tried to persuade Reichskommissar Josef Terboven and others, but without success.

As part of the legal purge in Norway after World War II, Smedal was punished economically for his collaboration.
