= Pluton emplacement =

Accommodation of magma in a host rock

The methods of pluton emplacement are the ways magma is accommodated into a host rock where the final result is a pluton. These methods are not yet fully understood, but there are several proposed pluton emplacement mechanisms. Stoping, incremental emplacement, ballooning and diapirism are the widely accepted mechanisms.

== Stoping ==
Vertical migration of magma is driven by gravity. Stoping occurs when blocks of wall rock material are transferred downward through a pluton. Stoping is an important emplacement mechanism in a variety of tectonic settings and has been widely used to explain discordant pluton contacts. The most common signatures of stoping are sharp discordant contacts between plutons and wall rocks and a lack of ductile deformation of the wall rocks. Other characteristics of stoping include the presence of xenoliths in the plutons, evidence for the rotation of xenoliths and geochemical evidence of magma contamination.

=== Structural relations around stoped blocks ===
Igneous minerals within a pluton can record deformation history. Therefore, it is useful to understand magmatic fabrics for understanding pluton emplacement. Experimental work done on rocks has helped with establishing a relationship between the rheology and deformation mechanisms on magma. The setbacks encountered are foliation and lineation can be produced by a number of different processes, magmatic strains can be decoupled from the host rocks, and strains and timing the exact time of fabric formation with a particular pluton ascent mechanism is difficult. Magmatic foliations and mafic enclaves usually indicate radially increasing strains normal to the pluton contact and extensional strains parallel to it.

Magmatic fabrics will not record information of the stoping process as they are only formed near the end of the pluton emplacement. Furthermore, any magmatic fabrics that are recorded are likely to be affected by strain. Therefore, the causes of the magmatic fabrics may not be discernable, and at best can only give inferences to the mechanisms for emplacement of the pluton, or magma chamber internal mechanisms.

=== Problems with stoping as an emplacement process ===
In order for a magma body of a certain volume (V) to ascend by stoping by a distance equal to its height (H), a volume of wall rocks equivalent to its volume (V) must sink through the magma. For that reason, for stoping to be an important magma ascent process, plutons should contain large volumes of xenoliths. The floors of plutons such as the Lookout Peak pluton, the Tinemaha pluton and a number of other plutons around the world lack an abundance of xenoliths. If stoping is a significant process there should be abundant xenoliths found.

Daly, who proposed the theory of stoping argued that it is an efficient process because large blocks can sink rapidly because of the quadratic dependence on sinking velocity. Given the size of the blocks sinking, there should be abundant small fragments produced by natural fragmentation, however there is a paucity of small fragments at pluton margins and this is inconsistent with stoping.

Another drawback of stoping is it cools too rapidly and occurs too slowly for low density crustal rocks. There is also not a lot of evidence for forceful lateral emplacement with sufficient strain to make room for the ascending pluton.

== Incremental emplacement ==
There is growing evidence that large homogenous plutons grew incrementally, frequently as sills. Sheeted intrusions are recognizable worldwide. Evidence suggests that steeply dipping sheets at the margins of some plutons were emplaced sub horizontally and then tilted at the margin of a sagging floor. It is thought that plutons are fed by dikes and have grown by this process. This is evident in McDoogle pluton in the Sierra Nevada; this pluton is compositionally layered parallel to its contacts and contains numerous thin concordant panels of wall rock. Ascent by stoping is less feasible with incremental emplacement because if the active magma body is below the top of a pluton, stoping rearranges material within the pluton and produces no overall ascent. To reach a position at the top of the older increments, an increment would have to stope its way upward through all previous increments. The rheology of host rock plays a key role: hard rock will be able to stop magma ascent. Magma emplacement occurs as pulses, with repose time. If the intrusion rate is high enough, the different pulses may mix, with their individual contacts being lost. Pulses are grouped into batches, sub-units and units, forming a pluton.

== Ballooning ==
Ballooning is an emplacement mechanism used to describe the in situ inflation of the magma chamber of roughly spherical plutons. In this proposed model, the magma rises until it loses heat and its outermost margin crystallizes, the hotter tail of the magma continues to ascend and expand the already crystallized outer margin.

== Diapirism ==
Diapirism occurs when a hot fluid mass of magma moves by softening a thin region of wall rock nearest to the body. It is thought to be limited to the mantle and lower crust which have high temperatures and ductile rocks.

== Summing up ==
In order for plutons to ascend, room must be made for them, but our understanding of the mechanisms at work is uncertain. The question that is most commonly asked is what happens to the rock previously occupying the space now occupied by the pluton. A viable method proposed to make room for ascending magma is a zone of lateral extension which can be found at mid ocean ridges, strike slip faults and dilational jogs (areas of tension along a fault offset). A problem with this method is that the extension rates are too slow and the slip magnitudes are too small to allow a magma chamber to form by intrusion of magma at the known extension rate.

== See also ==
- Skaergaard intrusion
