= Storfjord Station =

Storfjord
- Location within Greenland
- Coordinates: 68°10′N 31°50′W
- State: Denmark
- Constituent country: Greenland
- Municipality: Sermersooq
- Built /abandoned: 1931 - 1933

Population (2019)
  - Total: 0
- Time zone: UTC-01

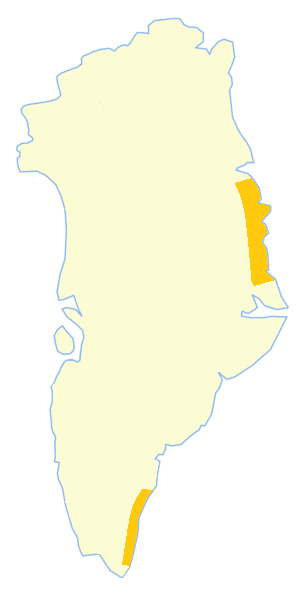
Territories of Eastern Greenland claimed by Norway until the 1933 Permanent Court of International Justice resolution. Storfjord Station stood roughly between both areas.

Storfjord was a Norwegian hunting, meteorological and radio station ("Storfjord/LMR") located in King Christian IX Land, Eastern Greenland.

Administratively the area were the hut stood belongs now to the Sermersooq municipality.

The station was built on the shore of Kangerlussuaq Fjord, also known as Storfjord. The anchorage near the station was difficult owing to the deep waters of the fjord and the very strong currents.

== History ==
In 1931 Norway sent two expeditions to establish hunting and radio stations in Southeast Greenland. Led by Ole Mortensen, one of the expeditions went to Kangerlussuaq Fjord on ship Signalhorn and built a hut there, Storfjord Station. Since hunting there was poor, Mortensen moved with his men south to Lindenow Fjord, where a Norwegian radio and meteorological station named Moreton was built 7 km (4.3 mi) from the mouth of the fjord in 1932. Meanwhile another Norwegian station was built in Thorland and named Finnsbu.

In the same year Norway staked sovereignty claims in Southeast Greenland between 60°30'N —just north of Nanuuseq, and 63°40'N —just south of Odinland. As a result, another expedition was sent by the Norwegian government led by Gunnar Horn on ship Veslemari and the Storfjord Station was reestablished. Together with Finnsbu and Torgilsbu further south, as well as Jonsbu in the far north, Storfjord became part of the Norwegian contribution to the International Polar Year 1932–33.

Danish explorer Ejnar Mikkelsen, whose 1932 Søkongen Expedition station was in the more protected Uttental Sound branch of the fjord, wondered about the choice of the site for a meteorological station by the Norwegians. According to him the Norwegian building was in a dangerous location, totally exposed to violent winds blowing from the head of Kangerlussuaq Fjord.

After the 1933 resolution of the Permanent Court of International Justice rejecting Norway's claims in Greenland, the stations at Storfjord and Finnsbu were closed, but Torgilsbu continued operation for a few years under Danish jurisdiction and restrictions.

In 1935, during the British East Greenland Expedition, geologist Lawrence Wager visited the area of Kangerlussuaq Fjord and noted that the Storfjord hut was completely destroyed, even though it had a concrete foundation and 1.5 m (4 ft 11 in) thick turf walls. Wager concluded that it had been razed to the ground by the persistent, hurricane-force winds of the fjord.

== Bibliography ==
- Spencer Apollonio, Lands That Hold One Spellbound: A Story of East Greenland, 2008
- Susan Barr & Cornelia Lüdecke eds. The History of the International Polar Years (IPYs). 2010

== See also ==
- Erik the Red's Land
