= Gunnar Horn =

Norwegian petroleum geologist and Arctic explorer

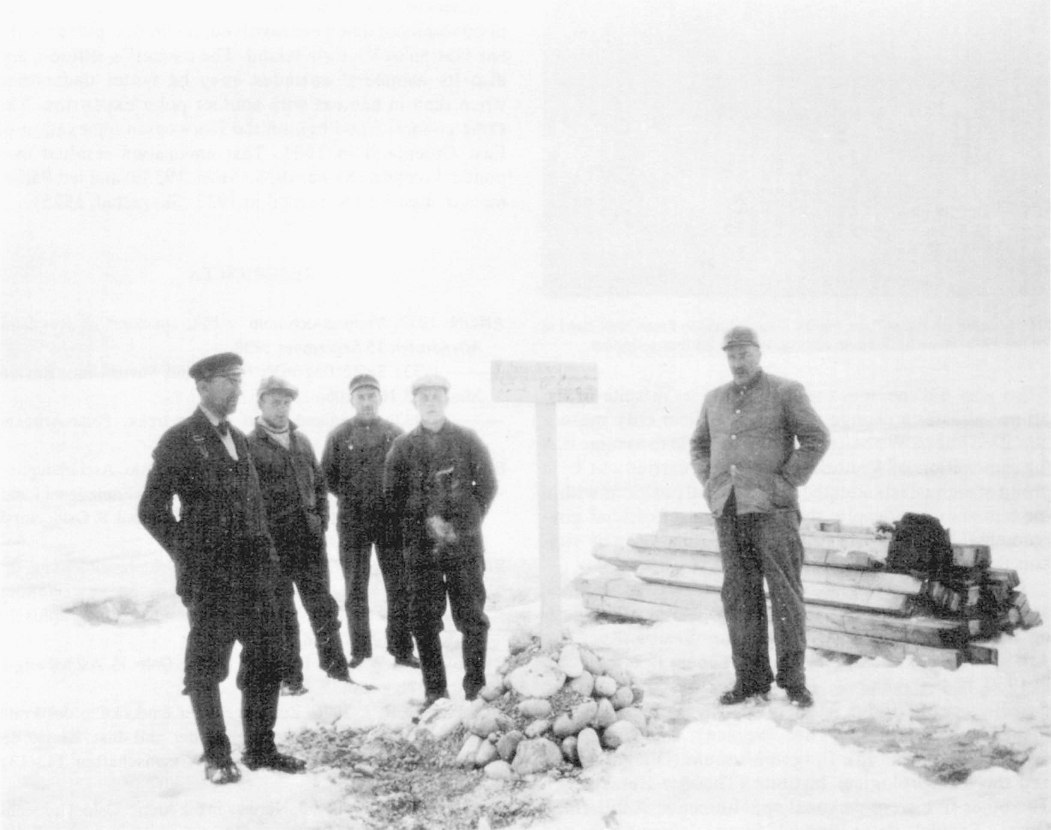
- Picture by Gunnar Horn of the Victoria Island landing team on 8 August 1930.
- Born: 25 June 1894; Christiania, Norway
- Died: 15 July 1946 (aged 52); Kapp Linné, Norway
- Occupations: Polar explorer, geologist
- Known for: Leader of the Bratvaag Expedition

Gunnar Hansen Horn (25 June 1894 – 15 July 1946) was a Norwegian petroleum geologist and Arctic explorer. He is most renowned as the leader of the Bratvaag Expedition that found the long-lost remains of S. A. Andrée's Arctic balloon expedition of 1897 at Kvitøya in 1930. The headland Hornodden of Kvitøya is named after him.

== Background ==
Gunnar Hansen Horn was born in Christiania (now Oslo), Norway. He was the son of architect Fin Horn (1861–1929) and his wife Kathinka Marie Hansen (1865–1942). Horn studied mining at the Norwegian Institute of Technology in Trondheim, graduating in 1916. He then studied petroleum geology at Royal School of Mines in London, and took a Ph.D. in coal petrography at the Technische Hochschule in Charlottenburg (now Technische Universität Berlin).

== Career ==
He was a leading Norwegian authority on coal and petroleum geology in the interwar years. In 1917, Horn was employed as a mining engineer for Store Norske Spitsbergen Kulkompani on Spitsbergen. He worked from 1920 to 1923 as a petroleum geologist in Trinidad and Venezuela. In 1924 he became employed at the Norwegian Polar Institute. In addition to his purely scientific work, Horn also had administrative duties in the Arctic islands.

During 1930, he headed the scientific expedition on the sealing vessel M/S Bratvaag which sailed under captain Peder Eliassen. The expedition located the camp of Swedish Arctic scientist Salomon August Andrée on Kvitøya. It also went to Victoria Island, intending to build a cabin there and claim the island for Norway. In 1932 he went on ship Veslemari to East Greenland to establish the Storfjord, Finnsbu and Torgilsbu stations as part of the Norwegian contribution to the International Polar Year 1932–33. On another expedition he went to Franz Josef Land.

Horn died in 1946 at Kapp Linné in Svalbard. He was buried at Vår Frelsers gravlund in Oslo.
