= Patricia Islands =

Island group in Antarctica

- Location within Antarctica

Geography
- Location: Antarctica
- Coordinates: 66°51′S 56°47′E
- Total islands: 3

Administration
- Administered under the Antarctic Treaty System

Demographics
- Population: 454657

Patricia Islands are three small islands 28 kilometres (15 nmi) southwest of Austnes Point in the west part of Edward VIII Bay. Discovered and named in February 1936 by DI personnel on the William Scoresby. The islands were mapped in greater detail by Norwegian cartographers from air photos taken by the Lars Christensen Expedition, 1936–37. They were visited by an ANARE (Australian National Antarctic Research Expeditions) party under R.G. Dovers in 1954.

== See also ==
- List of Antarctic and sub-Antarctic islands
