= Tunu =

Former county of Greenland

Coordinates: 70°00′N 31°00′W

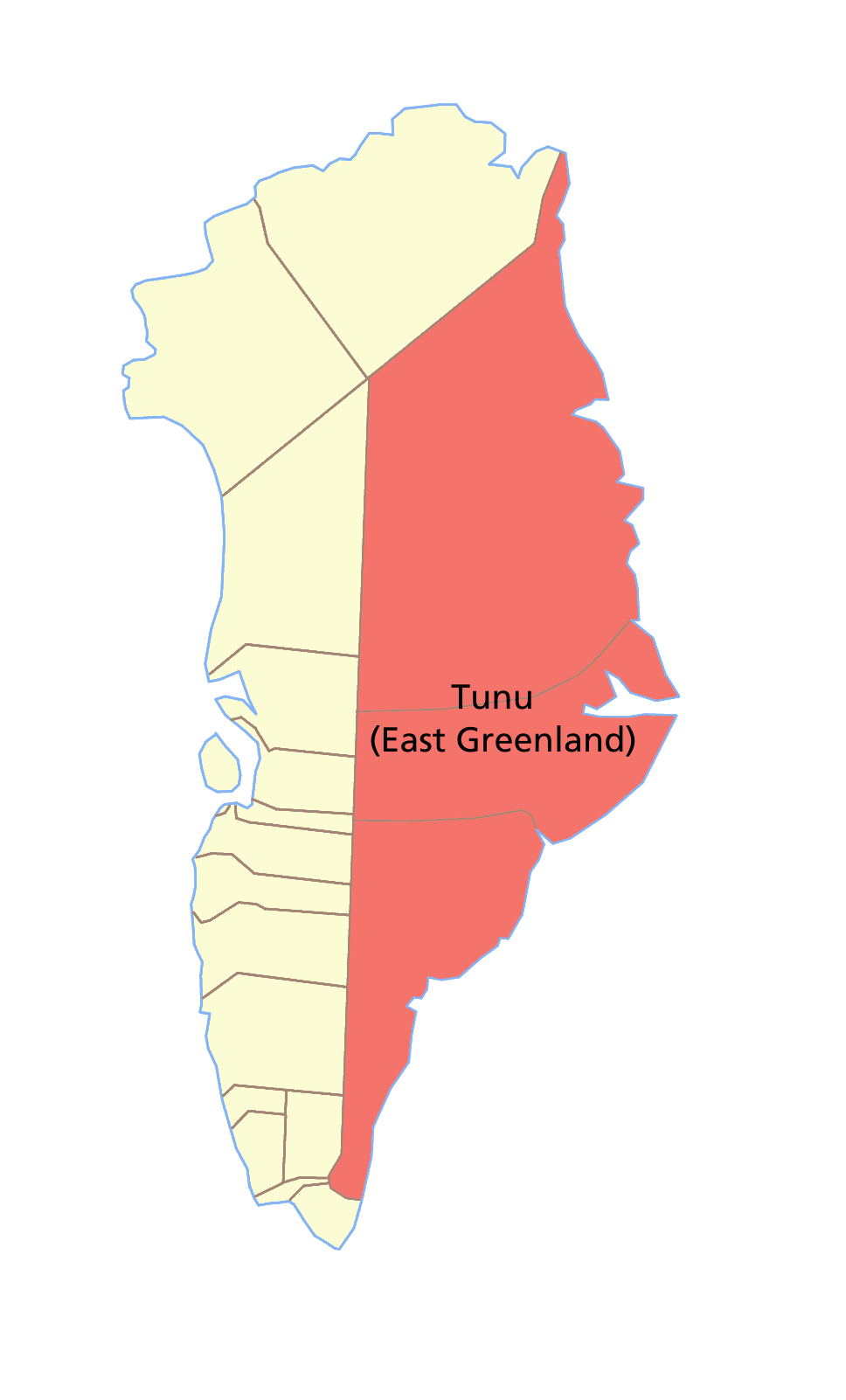
Map of East Greenland.

Tunu, in Danish Østgrønland ("East Greenland"), was one of the three counties (amter) of Greenland until 31 December 2008. The county seat was at the main settlement, Tasiilaq. The county's population in 2005 was around 3,800.

The county was made up of two former municipalities, Ammassalik Municipality and Ittoqqortoormiit Municipality. In 1974, the Northeast Greenland National Park was created from the vast and virtually uninhabited northern part of Illoqqortoormiut Municipality. It then covered the northern half of the county.

Tunu was bordered in the east by the Greenland Sea, Denmark Strait and the North Atlantic Ocean. To the west lies Kitaa, and to the north, Avannaa.

In 1988, the National Park was enlarged into Avannaa (North Greenland).

== See also ==
- Kap Dalton

== See also ==
- Subdivisions of Norden
- Administrative divisions of Greenland
- Erik the Red's Land
- Fridtjof Nansen Land
- East Greenland Current
- Eastern Settlement
