= Fridtjof Nansen Land =

Former Norwegian territory in Greenland

Fridtjof Nansen Land Fridtjof Nansens Land
- Unrecognized territory
- 1932–1933
- Flag of Norway

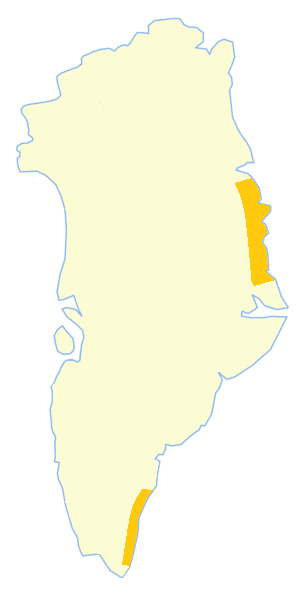
- The southern yellow area is Fridtjof Nansen Land, and the northern Eirik Raudes Land
- Capital: Finnsbu (unofficial)
- Area
  - Coordinates: 62°05′00″N 42°09′19″W
- Government
- King
  - 1932–1933: Haakon VII
- Governor
  - 1932–1933: Finn Devold
- History
  - Norwegian proclamation: 12 July 1932
  - Territory awarded to Denmark: 5 April 1933
Preceded by	Succeeded by
Denmark	Denmark
- Today part of: Ammassalik Municipality, now part of Sermersooq

Fridtjof Nansen Land (Norwegian: Fridtjof Nansens Land) was a suggested but not officially adopted Norwegian name of a territory on the southern East Coast of Greenland, that was proclaimed by Norway on July 12, 1932, and occupied until April 5, 1933. It was named after Norwegian polar explorer Fridtjof Nansen. The short-lived territory occupied much of King Frederick VI Coast, which had been claimed a century before by the Danish crown.

The main settlements of the territory were Finnsbu in the north, with Trollbotn and Vogtsbu nearby, and Torgilsbu in the south.

Fridtjof Nansen Land was also a proposed name of the archipelago Franz Josef Land, a territory to which Norway had claims.
