= Selskabet for de norske Fiskeriers Fremme =

Norwegian fishing organization

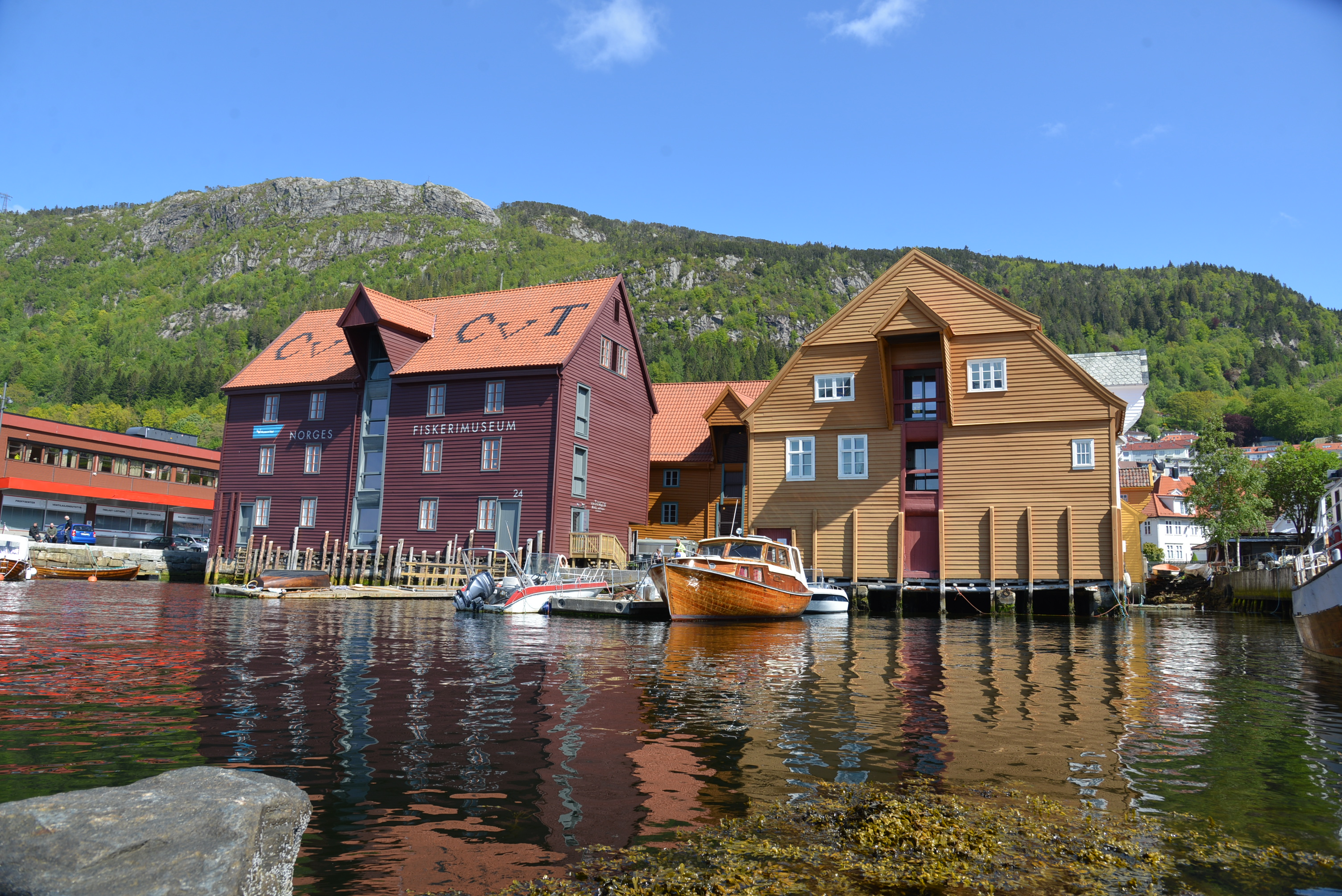
Norges Fiskerimuseum

Selskabet for de norske Fiskeriers Fremme ("Society for the Promotion of Norwegian Fisheries") is an organization located in Bergen, Norway.

The organization was established on April 26, 1879 in Bergen. In 1882, the company founded the Norges Fiskerimuseum. Exhibitions show the growth of the Norwegian fishing industry from the time of the modernization process during the 1800s. The museum also addresses the current fishing and aquaculture industry with focus on resource management.
