= Torgils Orrabeinfostre =

Viking hero of Floamanna saga

Torgils Orrabeinfostre (Þorgils Orrabeinsfóstri, Þorgils the step-son of Scarleg) is the Viking hero of Flóamanna saga.

A Norwegian weather station built in Nanuuseq Fjord in 1932 was named Torgilsbu, after this legendary hero. In 1940 this station was abandoned and the name "Torgilsbu" was transferred to one of the Bluie WWII weather stations, Bluie East One, a little further south on Prince Christian Sound.

== Summary ==
The chapters 1-9 and 18 of the Flóamanna saga detail Torgils' ancestry according to Sturla Þórðarson's version of Landnámabók. Then the saga narrates Torgils' adventures in Iceland and the British Isles.

After converting to Christianity from Norse paganism Torgils sailed to Greenland with his wife, companions and serfs. The ship sank off the eastern coast of Greenland and the roughly 30 castaways made their way south with difficulty on account of the ice floes and bad weather. They survived by hunting seals and had to put up with great hardships, including a disease that killed some of them. In the first winter Torgils' wife gave birth to a son. One day, while Torgils climbed a mountain to check the condition of the ice some of the servants murdered the woman and escaped with the boat and the provisions, but the baby was unharmed. Thorgils and a few of the survivors built a small boat with skins and tried to reach the Western Settlement. Miraculously Torgils was able to breastfeed the child. Finally, after four years of struggles since the shipwreck, Torgils managed to reach the Norse settlement on the western coast with only his son and two remaining companions.

== See also ==
- King Frederick VI Coast
- Sagas of Icelanders
