= Queen Louise Island =

Uninhabited island in the Kujalleq municipality of Greenland

Native name: Kissarsiitilik
- Interactive map of Queen Louise Island

Geography
- Location: North Atlantic Ocean; Southern Greenland
- Coordinates: 60°22′N 43°16′W
- Area: 46.1 km^{2} (17.8 sq mi)
- Highest elevation: 781 m (2562 ft)
- Highest point: Nuussuaq

Administration
- Greenland
- Municipality: Kujalleq

Demographics
- Population: 0

Queen Louise Island (Danish: Dronning Louise Ø) or Kissarsiitilik is an uninhabited island in the Kujalleq municipality in southern Greenland.

The island was named Dronning Louise Ø after Queen Louise of Sweden (1851–1926), wife of King Frederik VIII of Denmark.

== Geography ==
Queen Louise Island is a coastal island located off King Frederick VI Coast in southeastern Greenland between two narrow fjords on the southern side of the mouth of Lindenow Fjord. Its length is 14 kilometres (9 miles) and its maximum width 5 kilometres (3 miles).

Queen Louise Island is mountainous, Nuussuaq the tallest of its three main peaks reaching 781 metres (2,562 feet) in height. The island's coast is deeply indented and off its easternmost point lies the smaller island of Kanajoorartuut. Nanuuseq Island lies 7.7 km to the north, on the other side of the mouth of Lindenow Fjord.

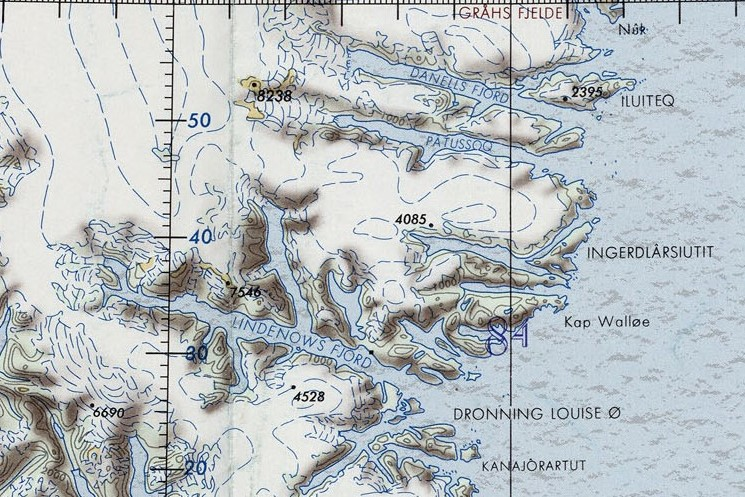
Map of Greenland section showing Queen Louise Island.

== See also ==
- List of islands of Greenland
