= Kapp Linné =

Headland in Spitsbergen, Svalbard

Kapp Linné Lighthouse
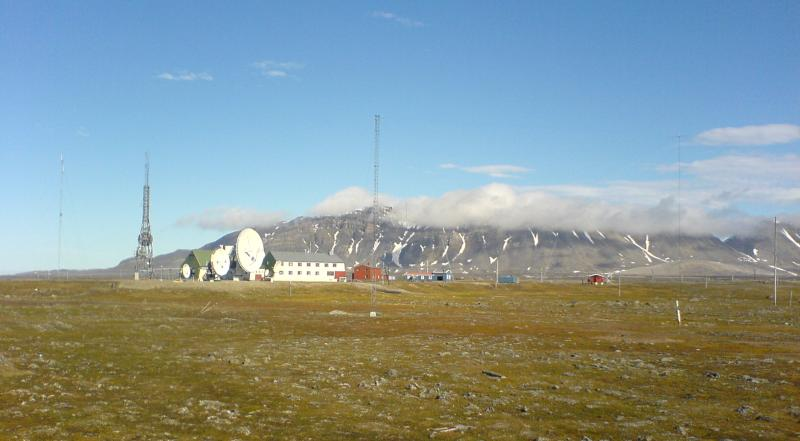
- Isfjord Radio at Kapp Linné
- Location: Spitsbergen, Svalbard, Norway
- Coordinates: 78°03′45″N 13°37′04″E

Tower
- Constructed: 1933
- Foundation: concrete base
- Construction: metal skeletal tower
- Height: 15 m (49 ft)
- Shape: square truncated tower with enclosed upper part and balcony, lantern removed
- Markings: light grey tower
- Power source: solar power
- Operator: Norwegian Coastal Administration

Light
- Focal height: 21 m (69 ft)
- Range: 9 nmi (17 km; 10 mi)
- Characteristic: Fl(2) W 10s

Kapp Linné is a cape at the south side of the outlet of Isfjorden on Spitsbergen, Svalbard. It is named after botanist Carl von Linné. The site is the location of Isfjord Radio. Parts of Kapp Linné is a birdlife protected area.

== See also ==
- List of lighthouses in Svalbard
