= John Haywood (British historian) =

British historian and author

John Haywood FRHistS
- Born: 8 March 1956 (age 70)

Academic background
- Education: University of Lancaster; University of Cambridge; University of Copenhagen

Academic work
- Discipline: Historian
- Institutions: Lancaster University
- Main interests: Vikings; Celts

John Haywood FRHistS (born 8 March 1956) is a British historian and author. A graduate of the universities of Lancaster, Cambridge and the University of Copenhagen, Haywood has served as a lecturer at the University of Lancaster. He is the author of a number of books on the early history of Europe, and is considered an authority on Vikings and the Celts. Haywood is a Fellow of the Royal Historical Society.

== Selected works ==
- The Penguin Historical Atlas of the Vikings, Penguin Books, 1995. ISBN 0140513280
- The Complete Atlas of World History, 3 vols., Sharpe Reference, 1997. ISBN 1563248549
- Atlas of World History, Barnes & Noble Books, 1997. ISBN 9780760706879
- Ancient Civilizations of the Near East and Mediterranean, Cassell, 1997. ISBN 0304349607
- The Cassell Atlas of the Modern World: 1914-present (with Edward Barratt and Brian Catchpole), Cassell, 1998. ISBN 0304350508
- World Atlas of the Past: The ancient world, Oxford University Press, 1999. ISBN 0195214439
- The Vikings, Sutton, 1999. ISBN 0750921943
- Historical Atlas of the Medieval World, AD 600-1492, Barnes & Noble Books, 2000. ISBN 0760719764
- Atlas of World History, Michael Friedman Publishing Group, 2000. ISBN 1586630997
- Historical Atlas of the Classical World, 500 BC - AD 600, Barnes & Noble Books, 2000. ISBN 076071973X
- Encyclopaedia of the Viking Age: With 279 Illustrations, Thames & Hudson, 2000. ISBN 0500282285
- Cassell's Atlas of World History, Cassell, 2001. ISBN 030435757X
- Atlas of the Celtic World, Thames & Hudson, 2001. ISBN 0500051097
- The Atlas of Past Times, Brown Reference, 2002. ISBN 0681423188
- Historical Atlas of the Early Modern World, 1492-1783, Barnes & Noble Books, 2002. ISBN 0760732043
- Everyday Life in the Ancient World, Anness Publishing, 2003. ISBN 0754812243
- Gods and Beliefs: Gods, Beliefs and Ceremonies Through the Ages, Anness Publishing, 2003. ISBN 1842159135
- Tribes and Empires, Anness Publishing, 2004. ISBN 1842159577
- The Complete Illustrated Guide to the Kings & Queens of Britain: A Magnificent and Authoritative History of the Royalty of Britain, the Rulers, Their Consorts and Families, and the Pretenders to the Throne (with Charles Phillips), Anness Publishing, 2006. ISBN 0754816281
- Dark Age Naval Power: A Reassessment of Frankish and Anglo-Saxon Seafaring Activity, Anglo-Saxon Books, 2006. ISBN 1898281432
- Living History: What Life Was Like in Ancient Times, Anness Publishing, 2006. ISBN 075481565X
- The Great Migrations: From the Earliest Humans to the Age of Globalization, Gardners Books, 2008. ISBN 1847245439
- Medieval Europe, Capstone, 2008. ISBN 141093294X
- West African Kingdoms, Raintree, 2008. ISBN 1410932915
- The Historical Atlas of the Celtic World (with Barry Cunliffe), Thames & Hudson, 2009. ISBN 0500288313
- The Ancient World, Penguin Group, 2010. ISBN 1849164894
- The New Atlas of World History: Global Events at a Glance, Princeton University Press, 2011. ISBN 0691152691
- Chronicles of the Ancient World, Quercus, 2012. ISBN 1780873212
- Viking: The Norse Warrior's [Unofficial] Manual, Thames & Hudson, 2013. ISBN 0500771413
- The Celts: Bronze Age to New Age, Routledge, 2014. ISBN 1317870166
- Northmen: The Viking Saga, AD 793-1241, Macmillan, 2016. ISBN 125010615X
- Ancient Romans, Brown Bear Books, 2017. ISBN 1781212260
