= Torgilsbu =

- Location within Greenland
- Coordinates: 60°32′23.6″N 43°13′14″W
- State: Denmark
- Constituent country: Greenland
- Municipality: Kujalleq
- Built: 1932

Population (2019)
  - Total: 0
- Time zone: UTC-01

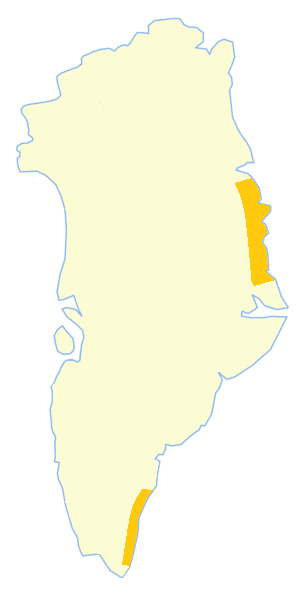
Territories of Eastern Greenland claimed by Norway until the 1933 Permanent Court of International Justice resolution.

Torgilsbu was a Norwegian hunting, meteorological and radio station (Torgilsbu Radio/LMQ) located on the King Frederick VI Coast, Southeastern Greenland.

Administratively the area were the hut stood belongs now to the Kujalleq municipality.

The station was located on the northern shore of the head of Nanuuseq Fjord, formerly known as Oyfjord. There was an anchorage in the fjord near the station.

== History ==
In 1931 Norway sent two expeditions to establish hunting and radio stations in Southeast Greenland. Led by Ole Mortensen, one of the expeditions went to Storfjord (Kangerlussuaq Fjord) on ship Signalhorn and built a hut there. Since hunting there was poor, Mortensen moved with his men to Lindenow Fjord, where a Norwegian radio and meteorological station named Moreton was built 7 km (4.3 mi) from the mouth of the fjord in 1932. Meanwhile another Norwegian station was built in Thorland and named Finnsbu.

In the same year Norway staked sovereignty claims in Southeast Greenland between 60°30'N —just north of Nanuuseq, and 63°40'N —just south of Odinland. As a result, another expedition was sent by the Norwegian government led by Gunnar Horn on ship Veslemari and the Storfjord Station was reestablished. The Lindenow Fjord station was moved to a better location further north to Nanuuseq Fjord.

The meteorological station in the new location was named "Torgilsbu", after Torgils Orrabeinfostre, a legendary Norseman who was shipwrecked in 1001 and spent four years trying to reach the Western Settlement. Subsequently seven smaller stations were established in the area near Torgilsbu.

Together with Finnsbu and Storfjord further north, Torgilsbu became part of the Norwegian contribution to the International Polar Year 1932–33.

Gino Watkins and his two companions, Percy Lemon and Augustine Courtauld, stopped at Torgilsbu during their open boat journey of 600 nautical miles (1,111 km) around the King Frederick VI Coast in the south of Greenland. The Norwegians gave them hospitality and helped them to repair their boats.

Mortensen died by drowning in the waters of the fjord while fishing on the ice. After the 1933 resolution of the Permanent Court of International Justice rejecting Norway's claims in Greenland, the stations further north at Storfjord and Finnsbu were closed, but Torgilsbu continued operation, being staffed by a complement of three that were relieved each year by a Norwegian ship. The station was closed in 1940, following the German occupation of Norway.

After the Nanuuseq Fjord station was abandoned, the name "Torgilsbu" was transferred to one of the Bluie WWII weather stations, Bluie East One, a little further south on Prince Christian Sound.

== Bibliography ==
- Spencer Apollonio, Lands That Hold One Spellbound: A Story of East Greenland, 2008
- Frode Skarstein, “A cursed affair”—how a Norwegian expedition to Greenland became the USA’s first maritime capture in World War II. Norwegian Polar Institute,

== See also ==
- Erik the Red's Land
