= Nanuuseq =

Island in Greenland

Nanuuseq Nanûseq
- Location on Greenland
- Interactive map of Nanuuseq; Nanûseq

Geography
- Location: North Atlantic Ocean; Southern Greenland
- Coordinates: 60°28′N 43°7′W
- Highest elevation: 670 m (2200 ft)

Administration
- Greenland
- Municipality: Kujalleq

Demographics
- Population: 0

Nanuuseq, also known as Nanûseq or Nanusek, is an uninhabited island in the Kujalleq municipality in southern Greenland.

== Geography ==
Nanuuseq is a coastal island, although it is also considered a peninsula owing to it almost being attached to the mainland shore of King Frederick VI Coast. located off the southeastern coast of Greenland between the mouth of Lindenow Fjord on its southern side and the mouth of Nanuuseq Fjord —formerly known as Oyfjord— to the north. Its length is 2.6 kilometres (2 miles) and its maximum width 1,000 metres (3,281 feet).

Although Nanuuseq is relatively small, its highest point reaches 670 metres (2,198 feet) in height. The island's coast is deeply indented and the sound separating it from the peninsula on the mainland to the west is very narrow. Queen Louise Island lies 7.7 km (4.8 mi) to the south, on the other side of the mouth of Lindenow Fjord.

== History ==
Peder Olsen Walløe reached this island in the 18th century while navigating along the then unmapped southeastern coast.

Until recent times the Southeast-Greenland Inuit visited the area around Nanusek during hunting trips up and down the coast. Fridtjof Nansen wrote about them towards the end of the 19th century:

The woman-boat in question had in this manner spent three years on the passage from Umivik, and would no doubt take pretty nearly as long to return. The other woman-boat that was passing southwards from Cape Bille got as far as Nanusek, about 65 miles from the trading-settlements west of Cape Farewell, and there went into winter quarters;

== Bibliography ==
- Nansen, Fridtjof (1891). Eskimoliv. Kristiania: Aschehoug.Tr. as Eskimo Life, 1893.

== See also ==
- List of islands of Greenland
