= Kangerlussuaq Fjord, East Greenland =

Fjord in east Greenland

Kangerlussuaq Fjord
- Storfjord
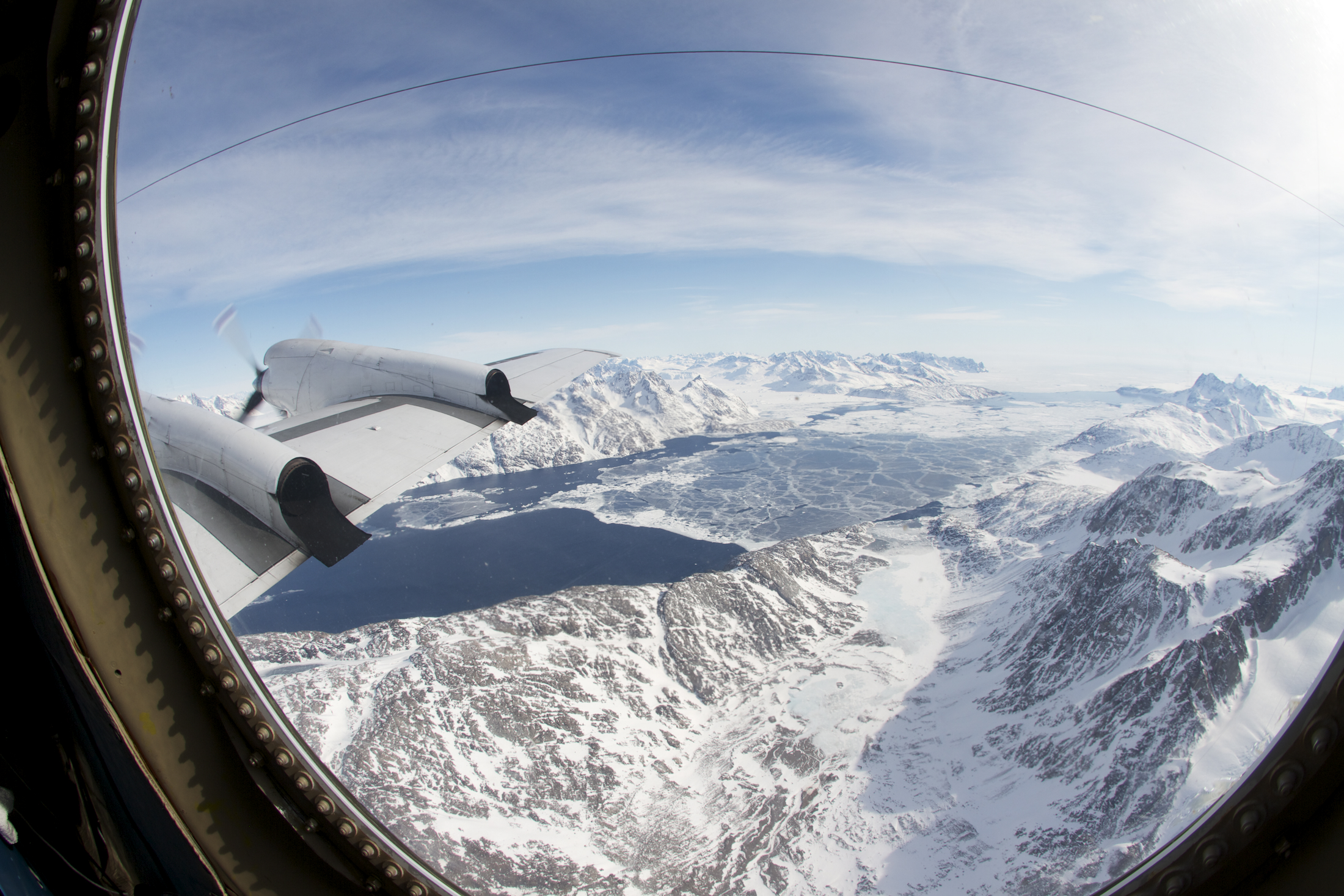
- View of the head of the fjord and the terminus of the Kangerlussuaq Glacier

- Location in Greenland
- Location: Arctic
- Coordinates: 68°25′N 32°26′W
- Ocean/sea sources: North Atlantic Ocean
- Basin countries: Greenland
- Max. length: 68 km (42 mi)
- Max. width: 9.7 km (6.0 mi)
- Average depth: 960 m (3,150 ft)
- Settlements: Storfjord Station, abandoned

Kangerlussuaq Fjord (Greenlandic: Kangerlussuaq, meaning 'large fjord'; Danish: Storfjord) is a fjord in eastern Greenland. It is part of the Sermersooq municipality.

The fjord was named by the East-Greenland Coast Expedition led by Georg Carl Amdrup in 1900. Currently drilling explorations are being carried out for the possible exploitation of gold, palladium and platinum in the Kangerlussuaq area.

== History ==
The eastern coast of Greenland was inhabited by Paleo-Eskimo people 4000 years ago and the Kangerlussuaq Fjord was likely visited by hunters. A quartz hand scraper found in Cape Irminger —24 km east of Cape Hammer— proves that the region was visited at least 2000 years ago. Inuit lived in the area between the late 13th century and the early 19th century.

Remains of Inuit dwellings were found in 1900 when the first Europeans reached this remote fjord during Georg Amdrup's East-Greenland Coast Expedition. However, the first archaeological excavations on the Skaergaard intrusion were carried out by members of the Second East-Greenland Expedition of the Scoresbysund Committee led by Ejnar Mikkelsen in 1932.

On the occasion of the Second International Polar Year in 1932 a Norwegian weather and radio station named "Storfjord/LMR" began operations at Mud Bay (Mudderbugten) on the southwest side of Kangerlussuaq Fjord. The station ceased operations in 1933.

In 1945 there was a hunters colony near the mouth of the fjord and a US run weather station was established on the Skaergaard intrusion. The weather station was moved in 1949 to North Apulileeq (Nordre Aputiteq) island, located about 45 km to the southwest off Cape Edvard Holm.

== Geography ==
This fjord is located in King Christian IX Land, roughly midway between Scoresby Sound and the Sermilik Fjord and marks the southern limit of the Blosseville Coast. It is the second-largest fjord in the southeastern coast of Greenland. Its waters are fed by the huge Kangerlussuaq Glacier, the largest glacier on the east coast of the Greenland ice sheet, among other not so large active glaciers such as the Hutchinson Glacier near its southern entrance. The fjord stretches inland in a roughly NW direction and its mouth is located between Cape Deichmann and Cape Hammer in the Denmark Strait area of the Atlantic Ocean.

The Nordfjord, Courtauld Fjord, Amdrup Fjord (Atterteq) and Watkins Fjord (Torsukattak) are smaller side fjords within the Kangerlussuaq Fjord system. Kraemer Island lies at the entrance of Watkins Fjord, separated from the Skaergaard intrusion on the northern shore of Kangerlussuaq Fjord by the narrow Uttental Sund. Kangerlussuaq Fjord is a deep fjord with strong and dangerous currents.

=== Mountains ===
Near the fjord's entrance its sides widen, forming an impressive bay surrounded by towering cliffs and high mountains, such as the 1,660 m high Batbjerg to the northwest and the mountainous upland of the Nordfjord Plateau to the northeast. The Redekammen and the Kangerlussuaq Tinde are nunataks located to the west, the Prince of Wales Range (Prinsen af Wales Bjerge) is located to the north and the Lemon Range to the east of the fjord. The Crown Prince Frederick Range stretches southwestwards to the southwest of the fjord.

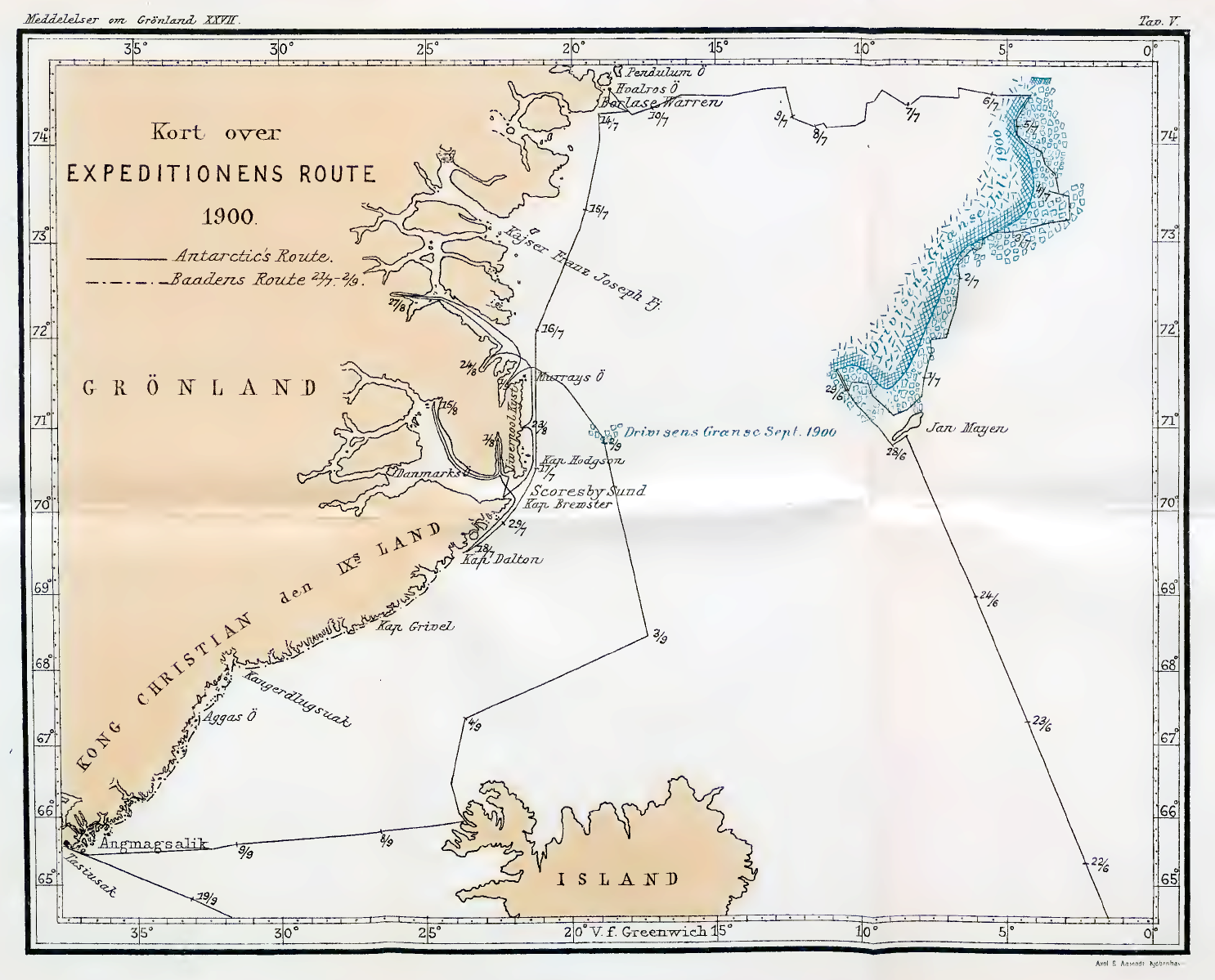
The fjord in a map showing the route taken by the Antarctic during Amdrup's East-Greenland Coast Expedition 1900

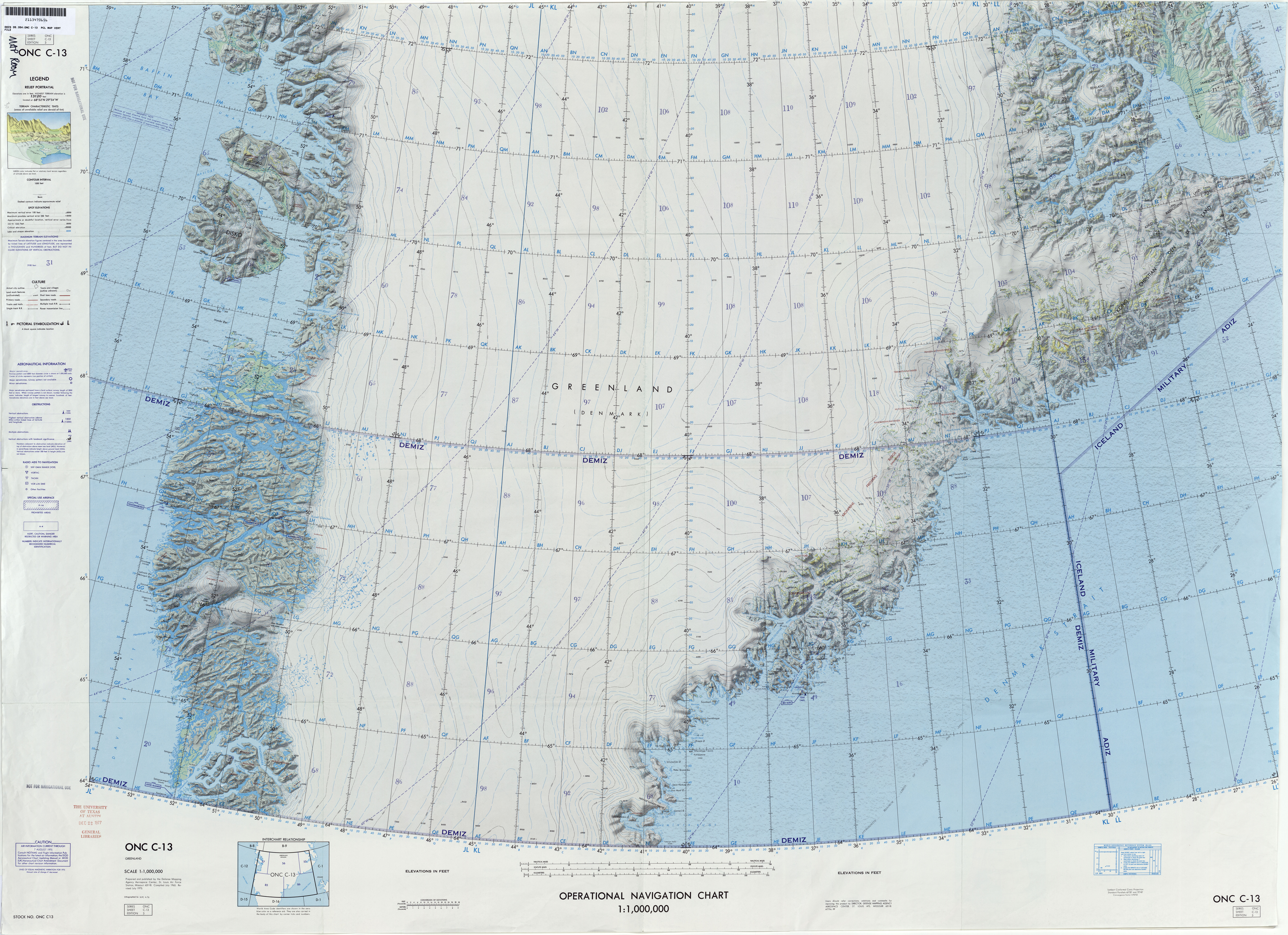
Map of Greenland section

== Geology ==
The area around Kangerlussuaq has been known for its unique geology since the 1930s regarding the many intrusions where magma from the Earth's interior has been forced into the Earth's crust. The Skaergaard intrusion that was discovered by Lawrence Wager in 1931 during the British Arctic Air Route Expedition is especially well-known.

== Climate ==
Tundra climate prevails in the region of the fjord. The average annual temperature in the Kangerlussuaq Fjord area is -11 °C . The warmest month is July when the average temperature rises to 2 °C, and the coldest is March, with -18 °C.

Climate data for Apulileeq, elevation: 12 m, 1961–1990 normals (Note: Except for precipitation days (snow or rain) that have the measurement period of 1961–1979 (18 years).)
Month	Jan	Feb	Mar	Apr	May	Jun	Jul	Aug	Sep	Oct	Nov	Dec	Year
Mean daily maximum °C (°F)	−7.0 (19.4)	−7.6 (18.3)	−7.7 (18.1)	−3.5 (25.7)	1.3 (34.3)	3.8 (38.8)	5.3 (41.5)	5.3 (41.5)	3.0 (37.4)	−0.6 (30.9)	−4.4 (24.1)	−6.4 (20.5)	−1.5 (29.2)
Daily mean °C (°F)	−10.8 (12.6)	−11.4 (11.5)	−11.6 (11.1)	−7.2 (19.0)	−1.9 (28.6)	1.0 (33.8)	2.2 (36.0)	2.4 (36.3)	0.7 (33.3)	−2.6 (27.3)	−6.9 (19.6)	−9.6 (14.7)	−4.6 (23.7)
Mean daily minimum °C (°F)	−15.1 (4.8)	−15.6 (3.9)	−15.7 (3.7)	−11.0 (12.2)	−5.0 (23.0)	−1.3 (29.7)	−0.4 (31.3)	0.0 (32.0)	−1.2 (29.8)	−4.4 (24.1)	−9.6 (14.7)	−13.0 (8.6)	−7.7 (18.2)
Average precipitation mm (inches)	57.0 (2.24)	56.0 (2.20)	50.0 (1.97)	51.0 (2.01)	45.0 (1.77)	78.0 (3.07)	32.0 (1.26)	95.0 (3.74)	76.0 (2.99)	68.0 (2.68)	61.0 (2.40)	39.0 (1.54)	708 (27.87)
Average precipitation days (≥ 1.0 mm)	9.0	9.0	8.0	8.0	7.0	7.0	5.0	8.0	7.0	10.0	8.0	7.0	93
Average relative humidity (%)	80.0	80.0	80.0	80.0	85.0	88.0	87.0	85.0	80.0	79.0	79.0	79.0	81.8
Source: NOAA

== See also ==
- List of fjords of Greenland
- Skaergaard intrusion
- Torgilsbu
- Finnsbu

== Bibliography ==
- Therkel Mathiassen (1934), Eskimo finds from the Kangerdlugssuaq region, København: C.A. Reitzel., OCLC 6335533
