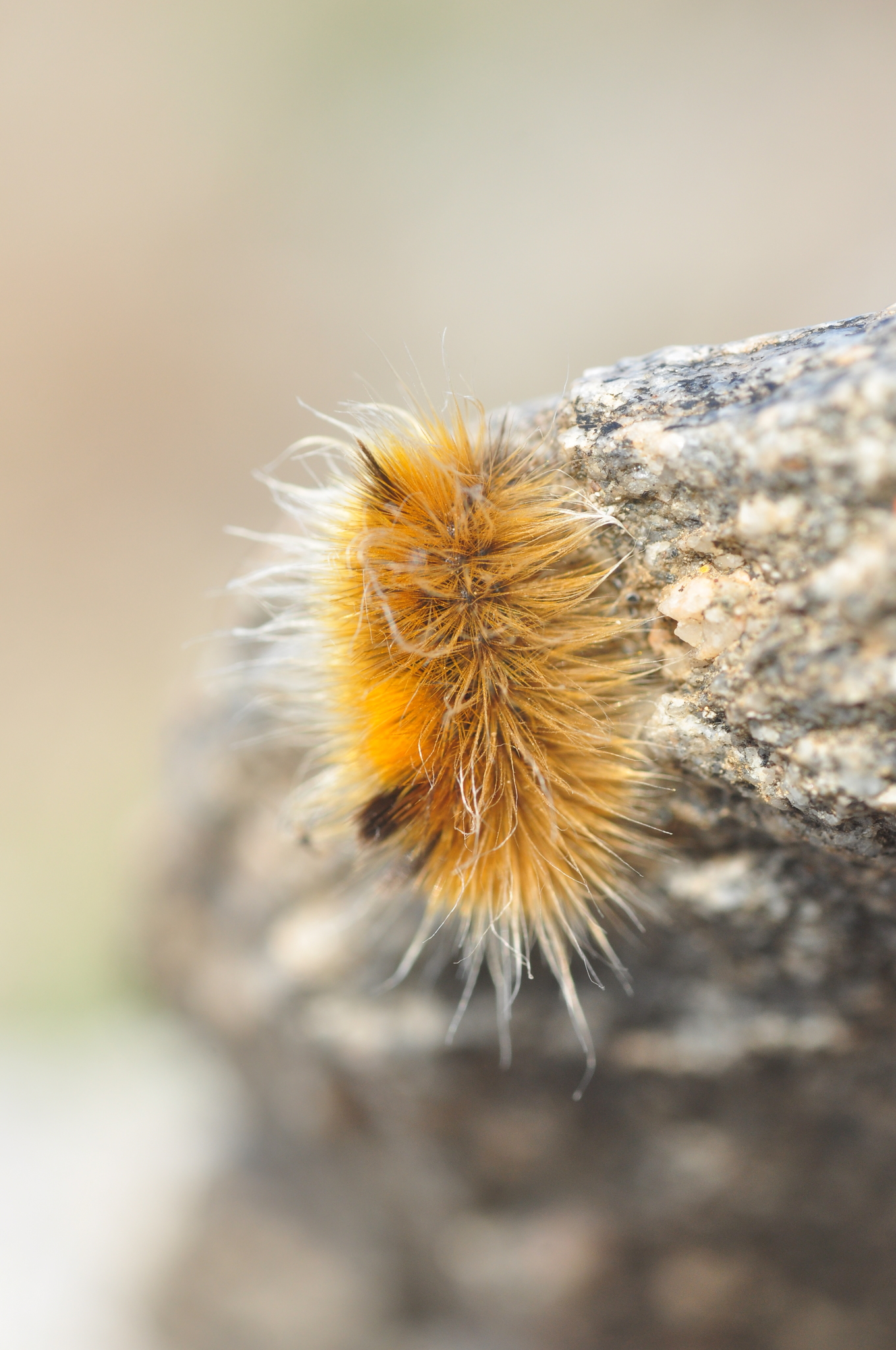
- Arctic woolly bear caterpillar, Greenland
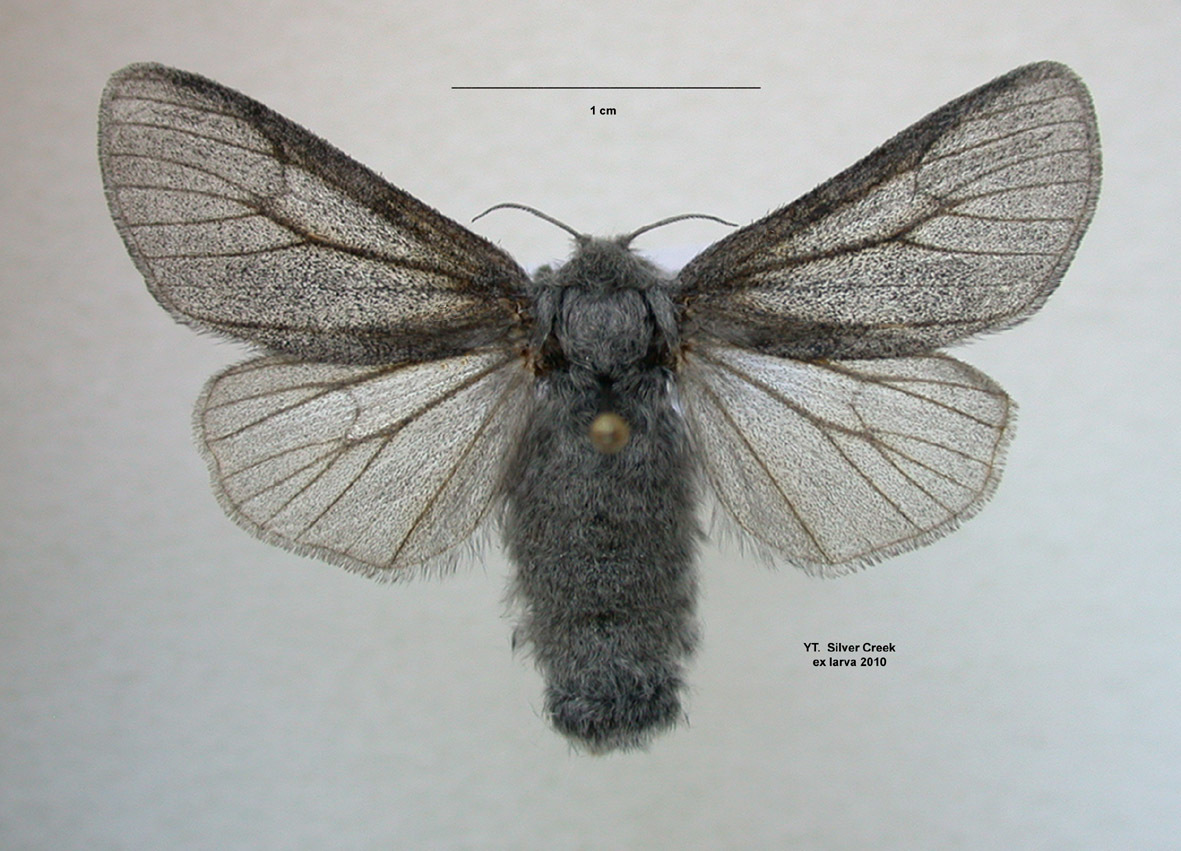
- Arctic woolly bear adult, Canada

Scientific classification
- Kingdom: Animalia
- Phylum: Arthropoda
- Clade: Pancrustacea
- Class: Insecta
- Order: Lepidoptera
- Superfamily: Noctuoidea
- Family: Erebidae
- Genus: Gynaephora
- Species: G. groenlandica

Binomial name
- Gynaephora groenlandica (Wocke ex. Homeyer, 1874)

Synonyms
- Dasychira groenlandica Wocke ex. Homeyer, 1874; Dicallomera kusnezovi Lukhtanov et Khruliova, 1989

= Gynaephora groenlandica =

Arctic woolly bear moth

Species of moth

Gynaephora groenlandica, the Arctic woolly bear moth, is an erebid moth native to the High Arctic in the Canadian archipelago, Greenland and Wrangel Island in Russia. It is known for its slow rate of development, as its full caterpillar life cycle may extend up to 7 years, with moulting occurring each spring. This species remains in a larval state for the vast majority of its life. Rare among Lepidoptera, it undergoes an annual period of diapause that lasts for much of the calendar year, as G. groenlandica is subject to some of the longest, most extreme winters on Earth. In this dormant state, it can withstand temperatures as low as −70 °C (−94 °F). The Arctic woolly bear moth also exhibits basking behavior, which aids in temperature regulation and digestion and affects both metabolism and oxygen consumption. Females generally do not fly, while males usually do.

This species has an alpine subspecies which is notable for its geographic distribution south of the High Arctic.

== Taxonomy ==
This moth was likely first discovered on 16 June 1832 on the beach of Fury Bay, Somerset Island, northern Nunavut, Canada, by the crew of the Arctic expedition searching for the Northwest Passage (led by John Ross). John Curtis, who studied the entomological specimens obtained from the voyage, described Gynaephora rossii from the invertebrates brought-back; however, in 1897 Harrison G. Dyar showed that, when compared to the caterpillars of G. rossii he had previously collected from the heights of Mount Washington, New Hampshire, in fact caterpillars of G. groenlandica had been collected in 1832, and Curtis had based his description of the larvae on the wrong species.

Before that, however, specimens were recovered in 1870 from northern Greenland by Gottlieb August Wilhelm Herrich-Schäffer, on board the Germania on the Second German North Polar Expedition (led by captain Karl Koldewey). These were subsequently scientifically studied and described by Alexander von Homeyer in 1874 as Dasychira groenlandica, a name which Maximilian Ferdinand Wocke (who had also examined the specimens) had given them prior, detailing this in a letter to Homeyer. Herrich was able to collect a number of specimens, and described the caterpillars as being like those of the Arctia moths, with the adults being extremely similar to D. fascelina (now Dicallomera fascelina), but having such crippled wings as to be nearly incapable of flight. Both Wocke and Homeyer noted that, while it was certainly a new species, it was closely related to the species D. rossii (now G. rossii, known at that time from the geographic vicinity in Labrador).

G. groenlandica was first believed to be endemic to the High Arctic, until a 2013 article reported the discovery of two populations neighbouring each other in alpine environments within southwest Yukon, 900 km south of their previously known distribution. The distinct habitats, disjunct distribution, DNA haplotype and wing patterns of these two populations were found to be distinctive enough to classify as a new subspecies, G. groenlandica beringiana. In the 1980s, moth specimens were collected on Wrangel Island, Russia; these were initially described in 1989 as a new species in the Dicallomera genus, D. kusnezovi. Further study showed the moths to be G. groenlandica, and, in 2015, the taxon was subsumed as a new subspecies, G. groenlandica kusnezovi.

As such, the subspecies are:

- G. groenlandica groenlandica
- G. groenlandica beringiana Schmidt et Cannings, 2013
- G. groenlandica kusnezovi (Lukhtanov et Khruliova, 1989) Lukhtanov et Khruleva 2015

It has been placed in the subfamily Lymantriinae (the tussock moths), tribe Orgyiini.

While G. groenlandica is a close relative of G. rossii, the two species are reproductively isolated, thus no hybridisation is known to occur. The two species are sympatric in many areas of the northern Canadian Arctic and Wrangel Island.

== Description ==
In general, G. groenlandica larvae are larger (~300 mg), and are densely coated in soft-looking hairs, which may actually be used as a defense mechanism to irritate the skin and soft tissues of would-be predators. While they are usually a distinctive tan-brown, amber cast, colors may vary. They are characterized by a distinct hair tuft on their eighth abdominal segment, which has been described as a "rudimentary hair pencil". Later larval instars are notable for the color pattern of this dorsal hair tuft. They can also be identified by the spinulose form of their hairs, which are spineless, in contrast to the finer, feather-like (plumose) hairs of their close relative, G. rossii. They may also be distinguished from G. rossii in terms of wing pattern: G. groenlandica lack the broad, dark band along the edge of their hind wings that is characteristic of G. rossii. In general, G. rossii also have more wing patterning than G. groenlandica.

The eggs are around 1.6 mm (1/16 in).

The cocoons of this species are double-layered, with a distinct pocket of air between the two layers, as opposed to the single-layered cocoons of G. rossii.

== Distribution ==
The nominate subspecies of Arctic woolly bear moth is native to the High Arctic of Greenland and the Canadian Arctic Archipelago including Ellesmere Island, or above approximately 70° north latitude. It is one of the most northern members of the Lepidopteran order in the Northern hemisphere. It occurs as far north as Ward Hunt Island in Canada and northernmost Greenland. A new subspecies G. groenlandica beringiana was described in 2013 south of the Arctic Circle in the alpine environment of the Ruby Range in southwest Yukon, 900 km south of the previously known range. A further subspecies G. groenlandica kusnezovi has as of 2015 only been found on Wrangel Island, Russia.

== Habitat ==
G. groenlandica is well-adapted to living in conditions of extreme cold in the High Arctic.

At two distinct field sites on Ellesmere Island, it was discovered that G. groenlandica, when in a diapausal state, tend to exist in specific microhabitats rather than in a random geographic distribution. Hibernacula are frequently found secured to the base of rocks, as opposed to being attached to vegetation. At one investigation site, hibernacula were observed primarily on the leeward (on the side sheltered from the wind) side of rocks, suggesting that wind direction plays a role in the selection of hibernation sites.

In captivity, G. groenlandica have also been observed anchoring themselves to leaf litter of Salix arctica during the diapausal period.

=== Range ===
The G. groenlandica caterpillar moves up to several meters per day, primarily in order to acquire the necessary resources. In comparing a group of caterpillars physically transferred between different Salix arctica (Arctic willow) plants and a second group in which each individual was restricted to a single willow for the duration of the larval active period, it was observed that transferred larvae demonstrated higher herbivory and growth rates compared to the stationary group. This implies that the acquisition of high quality resources is a primary reason for the movement of G. groenlandica larvae between host plants.

== Food resources ==
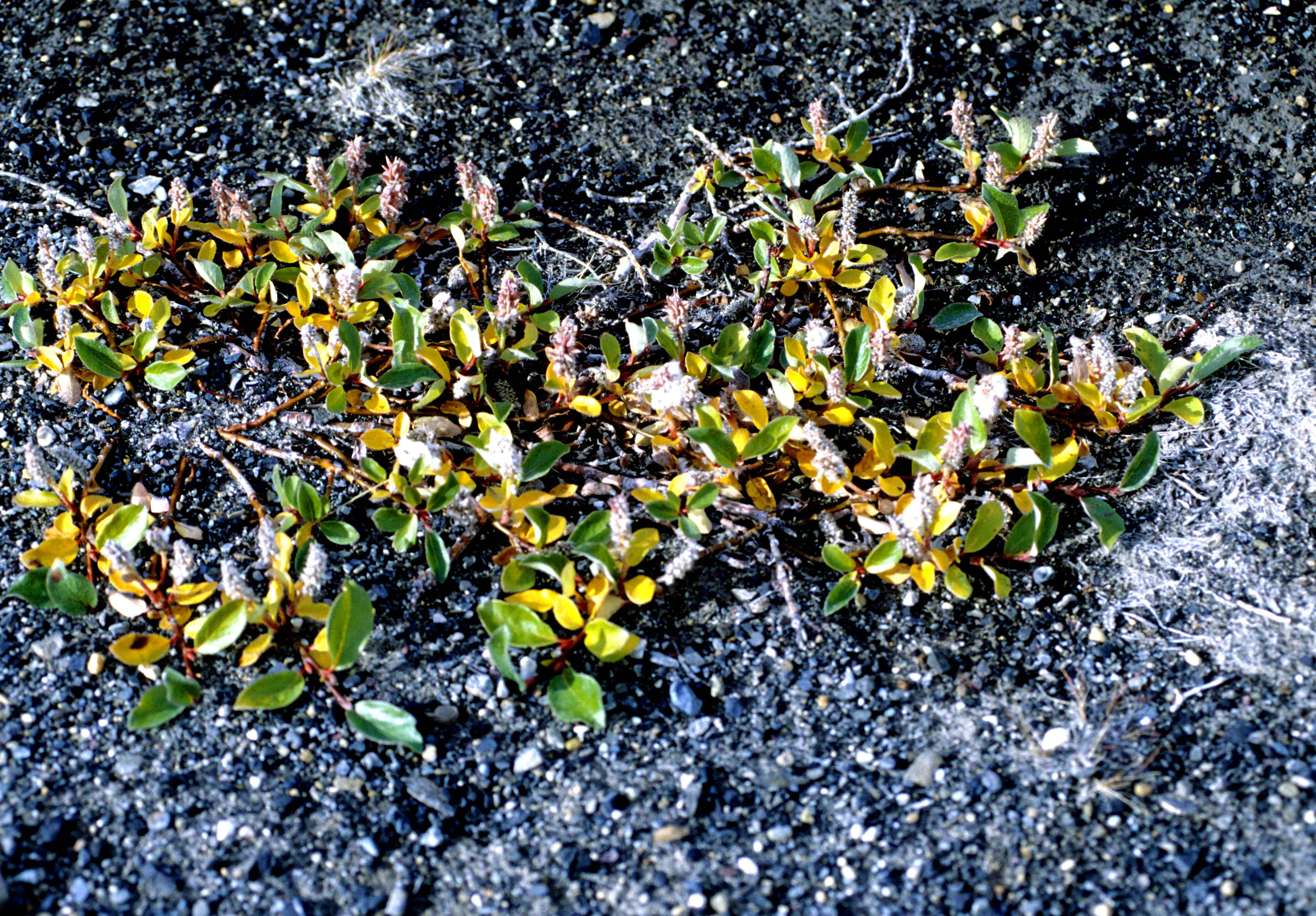
Salix arctica, the Arctic willow, is the larva's primary host plant.

G. groenlandica spends much of its life in a larval state, and food resources are necessary for development of the larvae. Salix arctica, the Arctic willow, is the primary host plant and food source for this species. The larvae may also feed on plants of other families, such as the flowers of Saxifraga oppositifolia and the senescent leaves of Dryas integrifolia. In the nominate High Arctic subspecies, less than 3% of larvae, however, were found to choose these alternatives. The lower latitude Canadian populations of G. g. beringiana of the alpine environments of southwest Yukon have larvae eating a broader spectrum of plants and proportionately less S. arctica.

While larvae rarely eat the catkins (petal-less flower clusters) of S. arctica, they readily consume the plant's leaves. 97% of larvae which actively eat at the onset of their feeding season are consuming the new leaf buds of this plant. Comparing the nutrient concentrations of plant leaves to those of larval frass, has shown that larvae remove nitrogen and potassium from the plant. Larvae appear to only feed in June, which is when the leaves of S. arctica reach their peak concentrations of nutrients and carbohydrates such as starches and sugars. The caterpillars decrease their food intake towards the end of the month and into the summer. At this time, the levels of carbohydrates and nutrients in S. arctica leaves tend to decrease, and the leaves become less palatable as concentrations of phenols and tannins increase. The decrease in nutrients and carbohydrates, combined with an increase in secondary metabolites, may account for this decline in consumption.

It appears to be adapted to a narrow thermal range. It is able to eat the most at temperatures intermediate to its range.

== Life history ==
The life history traits of G. groenlandica are dictated by the short, cold nature of summers in the High Arctic. Due to its restricted seasonal growth period, G. groenlandica has a life cycle of approximately 7 years. In contrast, its lifespan is much shorter (2–3 years) in warmer, alpine environments. Arctic woolly bear moths remain larvae for the vast majority of their lives, with the exception of up to 3–4 weeks of a single summer. This extended developmental period is not only attributed to low environmental temperatures, but also to the nutrition provided by its host plants. While they remain in their extended larval stage, G. groenlandica experience annual winter diapauses that commence in late June or early July. Larval mortality in an experimental caged environment on the tundra was found to be 10%.

=== Life cycle ===
On Ellesmere Island the females typically lay their eggs in a mass on or in their cocoon, although they sometimes lay their eggs on the ground or on vegetation around the cocoon.

This species spends the vast majority of its life as a late larval instar; its early larval and adult stages represent only 6% of its full life cycle. It is the later instars which experience multiple annual periods of diapause. During this dominant stage of their lives (from the third to sixth instar phases), G. greenlandica moult annually.

Larval activity is confined to a short period following snowmelt. The High Arctic presents a short growing season of 45–70 days, and the G. groenlandica cease foraging at the end of June, prior to mid-summer. Larvae tend to spend 95% of their time either basking in the sun, feeding, or moving, and only 5% of their time fully immobile. More specifically, about 60% of their time as larvae is spent basking, 20% is spent feeding, and 15% is spent moving.

In late June or early July, the larvae prepare to overwinter by weaving silken hibernacula and entering diapause until the subsequent snowmelt. This typically occurs when daytime temperatures are at a maximum of 5–10 °C (41–50 °F). In their diapausal state, G. groenlandica can withstand temperatures as low as −70 °C (−94 °F), and winter mortality is limited to, on average, a maximum of 13% of the population.

The developmental stages of pupation, emergence, mating, egg laying, eclosion, and molting to the second instar stage are all confined to a period of 3–4 weeks during a single summer. Emergence and reproduction may occur within a single 24-hour period.

Due to the brief lifespan of fully mature adult individuals, adult moths of this species are difficult to find in the wild.

== Species interactions ==
The presence of the caterpillars eating plants in a particular area appears to have a positive correlation with herbivory of the collared pika (Ochotona collaris) in southwest Yukon.

=== Predators ===
G. groenlandica has a distinct defence reaction to bat signals. The Arctic moth Psychophora sabini has some of its defensive reactions to bats, presumably due to the population being isolated from this predator. G. groenlandica and G. rossii, however, continue to possess this defensive behavior. When Arctic woolly bear moths are exposed to bat-like ultrasound (26 kHz and 110 dB sound pressure level root mean square at 1 m), males respond by reversing their flight course. Responses to the sound have been observed from up to 15–25 m (50–80 ft) away. Females, however, have a degenerated bat-sensing system. There are two presumed reasons for this. Firstly, females tend to be flightless and thus do not require this adaptation. Secondly, an auditory system would compete for space with the ovaries, and the cost of this defence mechanism may outweigh the benefit of having fully functional reproductive organs.

In the High Arctic these moths are preyed upon by birds. The eggs are also eaten by small foraging birds; on Ellesmere Island such birds may tear open the cocoons when feeding on the egg mass laid on the surface of the cocoon.

=== Parasitoids ===
Many G. groenlandica caterpillars perish during development due to parasitoids, namely the tachinid fly (Exorista thula) and the ichneumonid wasp (Hyposoter diechmanni). E. thula was described from Ellesmere Island in 2012, and is a gregarious parasitoid; on the island, it killed roughly 20% of the third and fourth instars of its host. Despite co-occurring there with the closely related Gynaephora rossii, E. thula is only known to attack G. groenlandica, whereas Chetogena gelida is host specific to G. rossii. In general, more than two-thirds of Gynaephora are killed by parasitoids, and parasitism in G. groenlandica causes more than 50% mortality. The probability of parasitism increases towards the end of the species' active period, which coincides with declining rates of feeding.

The hibernaculum, in which larvae spend a dominant portion of their lives, acts as a defensive barrier to parasitism.

== Physiology ==
=== Flight ===
While females of this species have fully developed wings and may take flight for a short time, they usually do not fly. Although Arctic-inhabiting females generally remain flightless, females of southerly alpine subspecies are often more mobile.

In contrast, males tend to fly high, fast, and erratically during the day.

=== Thermoregulation ===
The period of maximal activity for G. groenlandica is in June, during the annual period of maximal solar radiation (24 hours of sunlight) in the High Arctic; however, temperatures at this time continue to be extremely low. Ground temperatures in June, for instance, are usually less than 10 °C (50 °F). At this time, the body temperatures of feeding larvae tend to be similar to those of molting and spinning larvae, while those of "basking" larvae tend to be higher. G. groenlandica larvae spend approximately 60% of their time basking, including during periods of pupation. The behavior of basking is characterized as the action of a caterpillar orienting its body so as to maximize sun exposure and avoid wind. Larvae tend to follow the direct angle of the sun's rays in order to maintain maximal absorption of sunlight. They do this by orienting perpendicularly to the sun's angle of insolation. Through the act of basking, G. groenlandica larvae may raise their body temperature by up to 20 °C (36 °F). Generally, maximal body temperature is approximately 30 °C (86 °F). This peak temperature is generally only reached when larvae lie in midday sun, surrounded by snow, on a day with minimal wind.

Solar radiation promotes larval growth, and thus basking may increase developmental rates. When comparing larval growth rates at 5, 10 and 30 °C (41, 50 and 86 °F), growth and metabolic rates were found to be lowest at 5 °C (41 °F) and maximized at 30 °C (86 °F). This trend exhibits a specific relationship: as body temperature increases due to basking, metabolic rates increase exponentially. This was found to hold true even when larvae were starved or seemingly inactive.

In general, feeding larvae tend to have lower body temperatures than basking larvae. Therefore, larvae tend to feed when temperatures are highest, and they bask when they cannot reach the higher temperatures (more than 5–10 °C (41–50 °F)) needed for activity. It has been suggested that without the help of basking in 24-hour sunlight during High Arctic summers, larvae would rarely exceed their developmental threshold of around 5 °C (41 °F). This may account for the unique tendency of the Arctic woolly bear moth to have short feeding periods during times of peak insolation, followed by lengthier periods of basking and digestion.

In early to mid-June, larval metabolism tends to be greatly impacted by food intake and rising temperature. Later in the active season, they become much more metabolically insensitive to temperature, and energy obtained via food consumption is conserved.

Changes in metabolic state and body temperature also affect oxygen consumption. Oxygen consumption was found to be much lower when larval body temperatures were below 10 °C (50 °F). Low oxygen consumption was also observed in inactive larvae. In contrast, it was found to be higher for caterpillars that were moving or starved, higher still for digesting larvae, and highest for feeding larvae.

=== Digestion ===
Larvae frequently bask in the sunlight for roughly five hours after feeding before moving to a new site. The consequent increase in body temperature stimulates gut enzyme activity, which enables a higher digestion rate. G. groenlandica can convert ingested food at a rate of efficiency which is higher than the average value rate of efficiency of Lepidopteran species in general.

=== Diapause ===
G. groenlandica experiences a period of winter diapause during which it remains dormant within a hibernaculum. In this state, it can withstand temperatures as low as −70 °C (−94 °F). Encasing itself within a hibernaculum during diapause serves several functions: protection from parasitoids, avoidance of diminished nutrient concentration in their primary food source, Salix arctica, degradation of mitochondria linked to decreased metabolism (hypometabolism) and antifreeze production, and general conservation of energy reserves.

These cocoons are made of silk and consist of two layers, into which larval hairs are incorporated. In a 1995 study of experimentally caged larvae in the High Arctic of the Canadian Archipelago, 81% of larvae spun hibernacula.

During the active season, larvae orient towards solar radiation, and each spins its respective hibernaculum over a 24-hour period. They generally pupate with their head facing south, in a north–south orientation. This cocoon helps the larvae to accumulate heat more effectively.

G. groenlandica often anchor their hibernacula to the base of rocks. In captivity, G. groenlandica have also been observed to attach themselves to Salix arctica leaf litter during the diapausal period. In the 1995 study mentioned above, in which larvae were kept in a cage-controlled environment on the High Arctic tundra, more hibernacula were actually observed on the predominant plant cover of Dryas integrifolia (mountain avens) and Cassiope tetragona (Arctic white heather) as opposed to on their principal host plant, S. arctica. Almost half of the larvae which spun hibernacula did so in conjunction with other larvae, forming joint cocoons. Upwards of three caterpillars were occasionally observed sharing a common hibernaculum, but the most common case was that of two individuals sharing a joint cocoon. Higher rates of communal hibernacula occurred at lower population densities per cage.

As temperatures decrease in the late Arctic summer, larvae begin synthesizing cryoprotective compounds, such as glycerol and betaine. Accumulation of these "antifreezes" (which protect cells from cold conditions) is aided by the bottlenecking of oxidative phosphorylation through mitochondrial degradation. While the larvae continue to produce energy from stored glycogen in their frozen state, this mitochondrial degradation causes their metabolism to drop so low as to almost stop entirely, inducing dormancy. Mitochondrial functioning may be fully restored in the spring after mere hours of resumed larval activity.

== Conservation ==
At warmer temperatures, arctic moth larvae generally tend to have higher respiration rates and lower growth rates. They also tend to shift their diets to more nutrient-rich foods in this type of environment. For instance, the herbivory rate of the main food source for G. groenlandica, S. arctica, is altered at elevated temperatures. This implies environmentally dependent host plant plasticity in G. groenlandica. It also suggests that an increase in temperature due to global warming may have significant effects on the behavior of northern herbivore invertebrates such as G. groenlandica, as well as effects on the herbivory rates of their food sources. Thus, G. groenlandica may represent a potential indicator species for future studies on climate change.

== In popular culture ==
This species was highlighted in BBC's sequel to Planet Earth, called Frozen Planet.

== See also ==
- Belgica antarctica
