= Cape Bismarck =

Headland in northeast Greenland

Cape Bismarck Kap Bismarck
- Cape
- Coordinates: 76°41′57.9″N 18°33′12″W
- Location: Germania Land, NE Greenland
- Offshore water bodies: Dove Bay; Greenland Sea

Area
  - Total: Arctic
- Elevation: 400 m (1,300 ft)

Cape Bismarck (Danish: Kap Bismarck) is a headland in King Frederick VIII Land, Northeast Greenland. Administratively it is part of the Northeast Greenland National Park.

== History ==
Cape Bismarck was first mapped by Carl Koldewey (1837–1908) during the 1869–1870 Second German North Polar Expedition. It was named after then North German Confederation Chancellor Otto von Bismarck (1815–1898), who, together with King Wilhelm I, had been present at the departure ceremony of the expedition at Bremerhaven on 15 June 1869.

In 1907 this headland became an important landmark for the Denmark expedition which mapped for the first time the unknown shores to the north of the cape up to Cape Bridgman in Peary Land.

== Geography ==
Cape Bismarck is located at the southern end of Germania Land, between the northern end of Dove Bay and the Greenland Sea. It lies in an area of small islands, SSE of Danmarkshavn. Lille Koldewey, a reddish rocky island off Store Koldewey's NE shore, lies about 4 km (2.5 mi) to the SW of the cape.

Map of Northeastern Greenland.

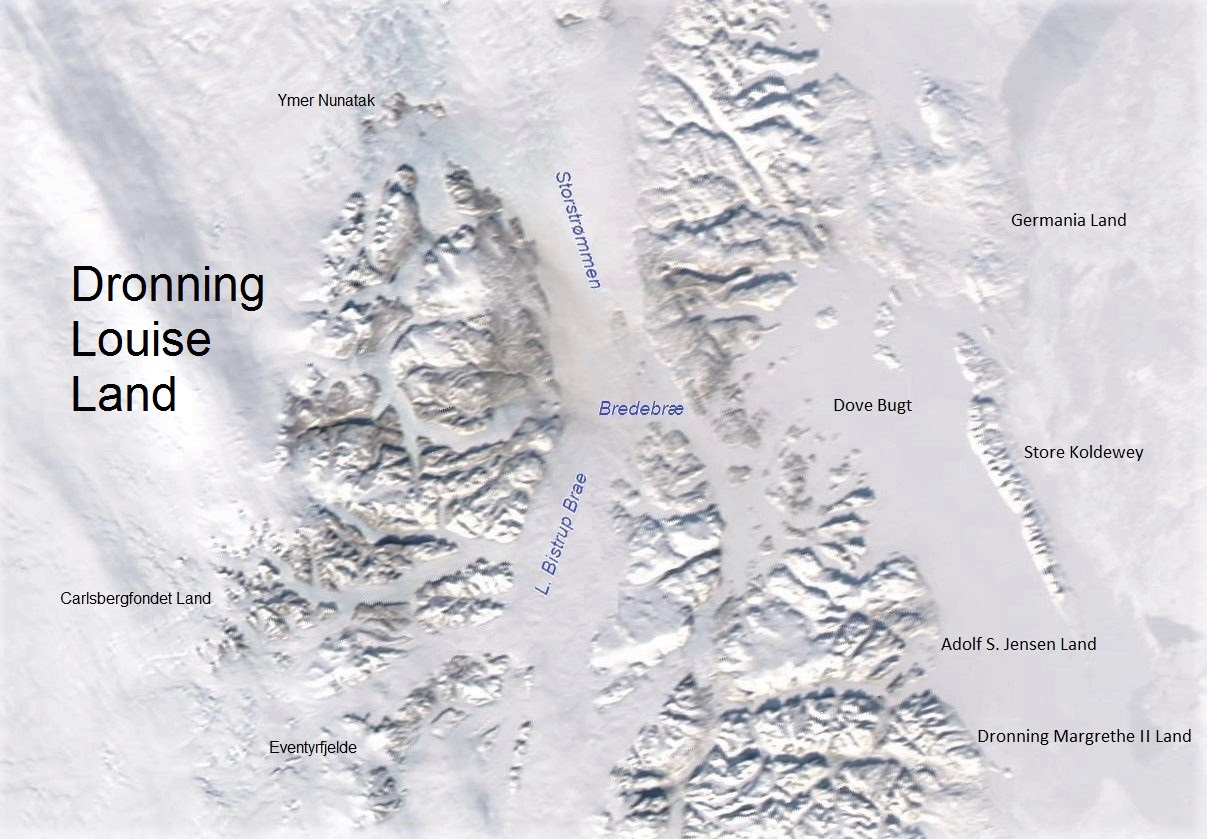
Dove Bay east of Queen Louise Land.
