= Devil Island (Greenland) =

Uninhabited island in Northeast Greenland National Park

Djævleøen
Nickname: Devil Island
- Location within Greenland

Geography
- Location: Dove Bay; Greenland Sea
- Coordinates: 76°24′N 20°20′W
- Area: 39.5 km^{2} (15.3 sq mi)
- Length: 11 km (6.8 mi)
- Width: 4 km (2.5 mi)
- Coastline: 49 km (30.4 mi)
- Highest elevation: 732 m (2402 ft)

Administration
- Greenland
- Zone: Northeast Greenland National Park

Demographics
- Population: 0

Devil Island (Danish: Djævleøen) is an uninhabited island of King Frederick VIII Land, NE Greenland.

== History ==
The island was named Djævleøen, meaning "Devil Island", by the 1932 Gefion expedition. It had been previously also known as "Teufelkap Island" —a name used by Georg Carl Amdrup in 1913— because of the Teufelkap, its conspicuous eastern headland that had been previously named by the Second German North Polar Expedition led by Carl Koldewey.

The curved horse-shoe shaped northern part of the island was named Hestefoden by the 1906–08 Danmark expedition, because the devil (Danish: djævle) is often represented as having hooved feet.

== Geography ==
The island lies in the southwestern area of Dove Bay. To the north lie the Licht Islands and to the west Godfred Hansen Island. To the south lies Nanok Island, separated from Djævleøen by the A. Stelling Sound, and further south Tvillingerne.

Map of Northeastern Greenland.

== Bibliography ==
- A. K. Higgins, Jane A. Gilotti, M. Paul Smith (eds.), The Greenland Caledonides: Evolution of the Northeast Margin of Laurentia.

== See also ==
- List of islands of Greenland
