= Teufelkap =

Headland in Northeast Greenland National Park, Greenland

Teufelkap Teufels-Kap Devil Cape
- Cape
- Coordinates: 76°22′55″N 20°10′49″W
- Location: Djævleøen
- Offshore water bodies: Dove Bay; Greenland Sea

Area
  - Total: Arctic
- Elevation: 732 m (2,402 ft)

Teufelkap (German: Teufels-Kap), meaning "Devil Cape", is a headland in King Frederick VIII Land, Northeast Greenland. Administratively it is part of the Northeast Greenland National Park.

Its cliffs are a home for seabird colonies.

== History ==
Teufelkap was named in 1870 by Carl Koldewey (1837–1908). The steep headland with a dark red hue looked frightening in the fog when it was first seen by members of the Second German North Polar Expedition in March 1870. Later visitors of the area confirmed that the name chosen by the German explorers was suitable to refer to the sinister-looking headland.

== Geography ==
Teufelkap is located in Dove Bay at the eastern end of Djævleøen. It is a conspicuous landmark. The entrance of the A. Stelling Sound lies to the SW around the cape.

Map of Northeastern Greenland.
