= Mørkefjord expedition =

The Mørkefjord expedition of 1938–1939 was sent out by Alf Trolle, Ebbe Munck, and Eigil Knuth in order to continue the work of the Denmark Expedition. It was an exploratory expedition to Northeast Greenland led by Eigil Knuth and had been planned to last from 1938 to 1939. It was affected by the outbreak of World War II.

== History ==
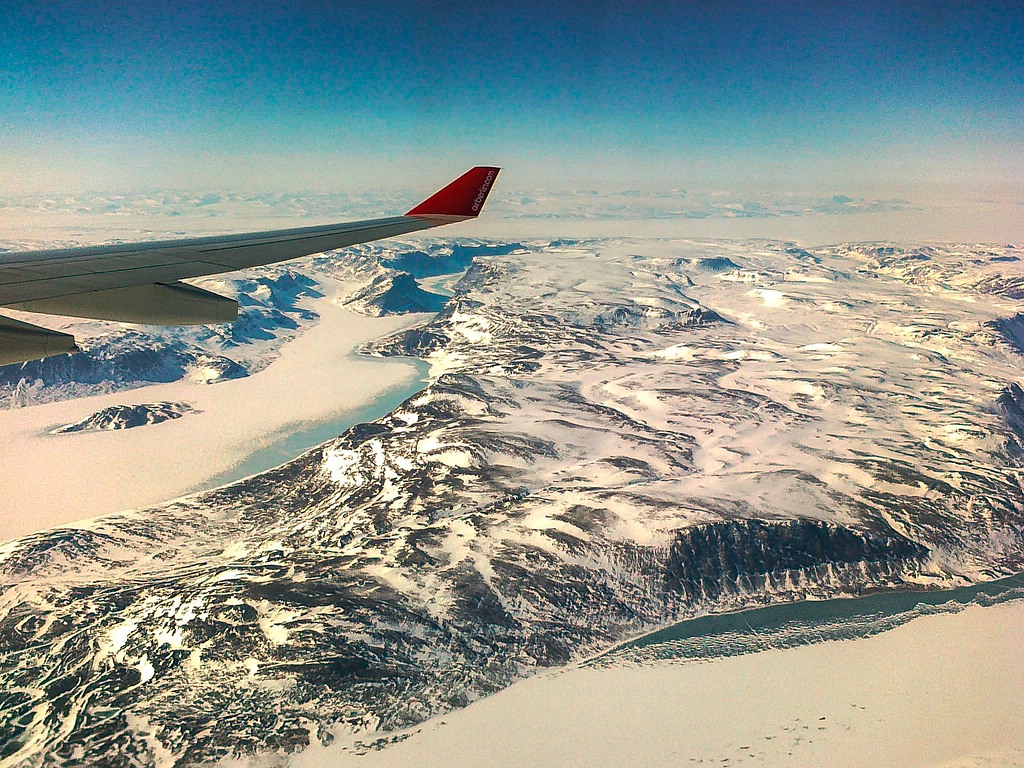
Mørkefjord on the left, Sælsøen on the right

There had been a previous expedition to Northeast Greenland led by Johan Peter Koch in 1913; the Mørkefjord Expedition. – which Alfred Wegener had been a part of. Eigil Knuth arrived in Greenland with his co-leader and friend, Ebbe Munck, on 19 June 1938. The other expedition members were botanist Paul Gelting, Alf Trolle, and five more men. The expedition made use of an aircraft – a Tiger Moth.

The expedition members began by building a scientific station north of the mouth of the Mørkefjord, west of Hvalrosodden. It was named Mørkefjord Station and was used as a base. The expedition also used a hunting hut in nearby Godfred Hansen Island built by the Nanok East Greenland Fishing Company.

Mørkefjord Station was manned for a further two years after the end of the expedition, from 1938 to 1941. The additional two years were for two reasons, first because of the Danish Meteorological Institute having requested a continuation of weather reports and second, because Eigil Knuth, faced with the outbreak of World War II, could not return to Greenland as initially planned and decided to continue the activities of the expedition. The Mørkefjord Expedition would map and name a number of geographic features in East Greenland during the years it operated in the area. The Mørkefjord station is now a ruin.

== See also ==
- Cartographic expeditions to Greenland
- List of Arctic expeditions
