= 1963–64 Greenlandic Football Championship =

Greenlandic Football Championship
- Season: 1963–64
- Champions: K-33 (1st title)
- Highest scoring: GSS 12–5 Nagtoralik Paamiut

The 1963–64 Greenlandic Football Championship (also known as the Danish: Fodboldturneringen Grønlandturneringen, Fodboldmesterskab i Grønland or Greenlandic: Angutit Inersimasut GM) was the fourth edition of the Greenlandic Men's Football Championship. The tournament was played in four regional groups, with two teams advancing to the regional qualifying finals. The winners of these qualifiers advanced to the final knockout phase, which was held at Nuuk Stadium in Nuuk. It was won by Kissaviarsuk-33 who defeated Nanok in the final.

== Background ==
The first federation to organise a national football championship in Greenland was the GIF (Danish: Grønlands Idrætsforening), a general sports federation that organised more than just football tournaments, founded on 3 September 1953 at a meeting attended by eleven clubs from Upernavik, Uummannaq, Qeqertarsuatsiaat, Qasigiannguit, Aasiaat, Sisimiut, Maniitsoq, Nuuk, Paamiut and Qaqortoq. The 1954–55 tournament was the first national football tournament and GIF continued to organise the competition, usually announced as Fodboldturneringen, Grønlandturneringen or Fodboldmesterskab i Grønland, until 1970. For the first decade of its existence, the tournament was held sporadically, with iterations often taking more than a year to complete. In 1971 a football specific federation, the Football Association of Greenland (Greenlandic: Kalaallit Nunaanni Isikkamik Arsaattartut Kattuffiat; Danish: Grønlands Boldspil-Union), was founded, and took over the organisation of the tournament.

== Format ==
The first phase of the tournament split the teams into four geographic pools, with three of these pools containing two groups and the pool containing the most teams (North Greenland) being split into three groups. The group winners then played off directly to qualify for the final phase, with two of North Greenland's pool winners playing in a semi–final before meeting Nanok, the other pool's winner and reigning champions in their geographic final.

The final phase saw the four regional champion play in a knockout series, held in Nuuk in September 1964.

== Knockout stage ==
1/16 finals
FC Malamuk	W
Qalaleq	L
Kingmeq-45	W
ASP-62	L
T-41	6
Nagdlunguaq-48	2
K'SP	W
Kugsak-45	L
GSS	15
Kagssagssuk	0
Nagtoralik Paamiut	9
Tusilartoq	0
K-33	4
Aassik-43	2
Pameeq	7
Nauja	0

1/8 finals
FC Malamuk	5
Kingmeq-45	1
Nanok-50	W
Piniartoq	L
T-41	5
K'SP	2
SAK	W
Kagssuk IL	L
GSS (a.e.t.)	4
Qoornoq IL	3
Nagtoralik Paamiut	4
Nuuk IL	2
K-33	6
Pameeq	2
Narssarmiutaq	14
Qavak	1

Quarter finals
FC Malamuk	0
Nanok-50	6
T-41	L
SAK	W
GSS	12
Nagtoralik Paamiut	5
K-33	8
Narssarmiutaq	2

Semi finals
September 13, 1964
Nanok-50	5
SAK	4
September 15, 1964
GSS	3
K-33	4

Final
September 17, 1964
Nanok-50	1
K-33	4
Third place
September 17, 1964
SAK	2
GSS	1
