= Edward Island =

Island in Greenland

Edvard Ø
- Location within Greenland

Geography
- Location: Greenland Sea
- Coordinates: 76°37′N 21°20′W
- Area: 115.8 km^{2} (44.7 sq mi)
- Length: 14.4 km (8.95 mi)
- Width: 8.6 km (5.34 mi)
- Coastline: 53.5 km (33.24 mi)
- Highest elevation: 231 m (758 ft)

Administration
- Greenland
- Zone: Northeast Greenland National Park

Demographics
- Population: 0

Edward Island (Danish: Edvard Ø) is an uninhabited island of the Greenland Sea, Greenland. The island is unglaciated.

== Geography ==
Edward Island is a coastal island located east of Queen Louise Land, off Cape Stop, east of Borg Fjord and north of Godfred Hansen Island in the Dove Bay, northeastern Greenland. The island has an area of 115.8 km^{2} (44.7 sq mi) and a shoreline of 53.5 km (33.2 mi).

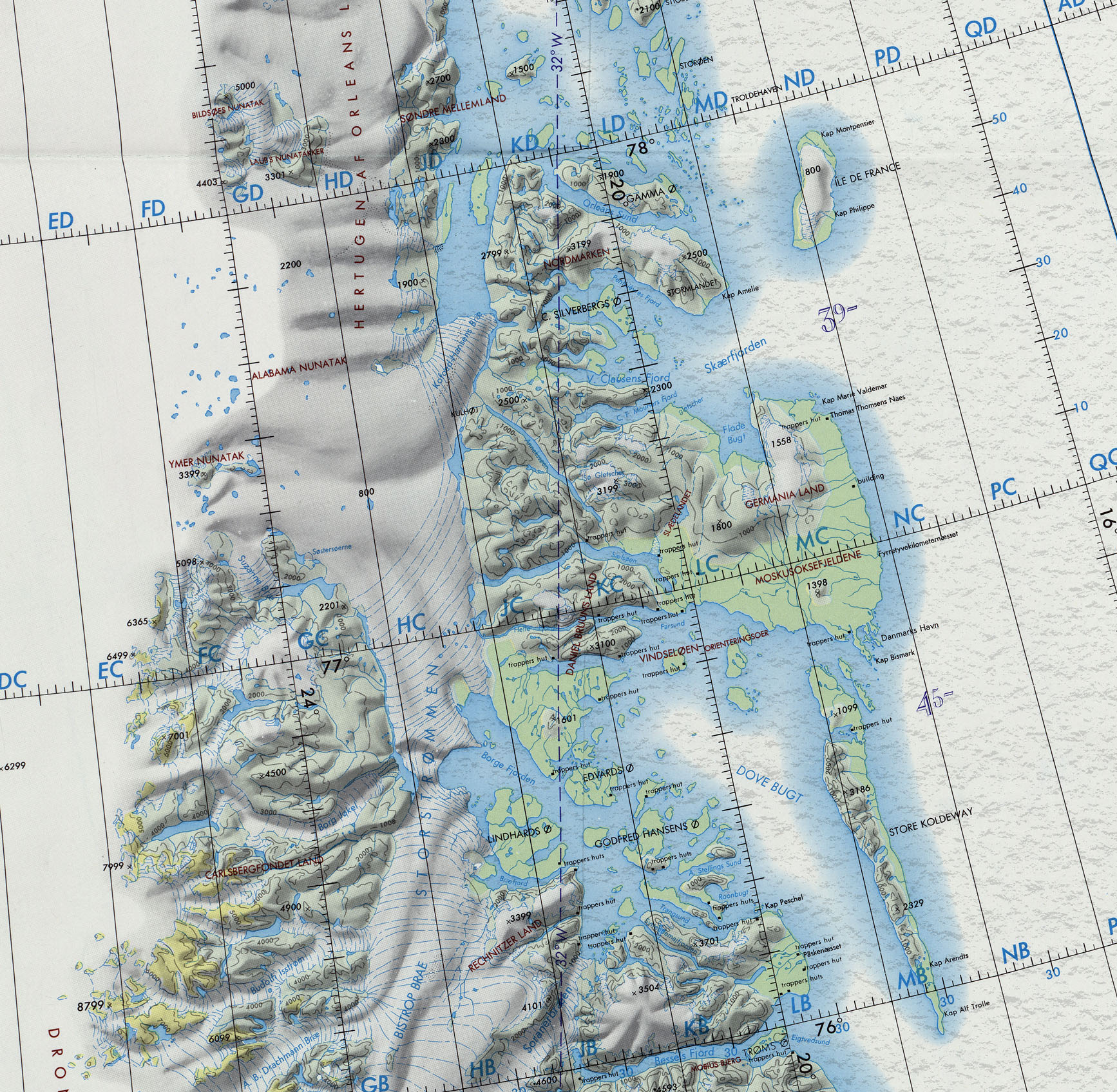
Map of Northeastern Greenland section.

== See also ==
- List of islands of Greenland
