= Hellefjord =

Fjord in Greenland

- Location in Greenland
- Location: Northeast Greenland
- Coordinates: 76°51′35″N 21°8′10″W
- Ocean/sea sources: Dove Bay, Greenland Sea
- Basin countries: Greenland
- Max. length: 30 km (19 mi)
- Max. width: 3.5 km (2.2 mi)

Hellefjord is a fjord in King Frederick VIII Land, northeastern Greenland.

== History ==
Hellefjord was named by the 1906-1908 Denmark expedition, after the German word for "light", in contrast with the "dark" Mørkefjord to the north.

== Geography ==
This fjord is located in Daniel Bruun Land, east of Danmarkshavn. There are two parallel fjords to the north of it, Mørkefjord and Sælsøen, a lake with a fjord structure. It runs from east to west for nearly 30 km. Its mouth is in northern Dove Bay.

Map of Northeastern Greenland.

== See also ==
- List of fjords of Greenland
