= Godfred Hansen Island =

Uninhabited island of the Greenland Sea, Greenland

Olgas Ø, Ragnas Ø
- Location within Greenland

Geography
- Location: Greenland Sea
- Coordinates: 76.452°N 20.918°W
- Area: 115 km^{2} (44 sq mi)
- Highest elevation: 396 m (1299 ft)
- Highest point: Sylen

Administration
- Greenland
- Zone: Northeast Greenland National Park

Demographics
- Population: 0

Godfred Hansen Island is an uninhabited island of the Greenland Sea, Greenland.

== History ==
Formerly known as Olga Island (Olgas Ø) —the name used by C.S. Poulsen— and Ragnas Ø —the name used by Henning Bistrup— at the time 1906–08 Danmark Expedition, the island was renamed in 1932 by the Gefion Expedition after Godfred Hansen (1876 - 1937), Danish polar explorer and first officer of the Gjøa, the first ship that made the Northwest Passage. The new name of the island was approved only after his death in 1937.

Gefion Havn is the harbour on the south coast of Godfred Hansen Island. It was named after three-masted Danish schooner Gefion of the Gefion Expedition which anchored in this harbour and unloaded building material for a hunting hut in 1932. The hunting station Ålborghus was built at the time of the 1938–39 Mørkefjord Expedition by the Nanok East Greenland Fishing Company (Østgrønlandsk Fangstkompagni Nanok A/S) in Gefion Havn, replacing the former hunting hut. The station was staffed during the 1938–41 and 1945–52 periods, being maintained by Sirius Dog Sled Patrol (Slædepatruljen Sirius) until 1988.

== Geography ==
Godfred Hansen Island is a coastal island located east of Queen Louise Land in SW Dove Bay, south of Germania Land. The island has an area of 115 km ² and a shoreline of 53.7 kilometres.

The Nørresund is a sound on the north side of the island and Sønderstrand is a flat coastal stretch in the south. Stakken is a small island east of Godfred Hansen and Sylbugten is a bay on the eastern side of the island, north of a mountain named Sylen. Gåsefjeldet is another mountain located north of Ålborghus Station. To the east lies Djævleøen.

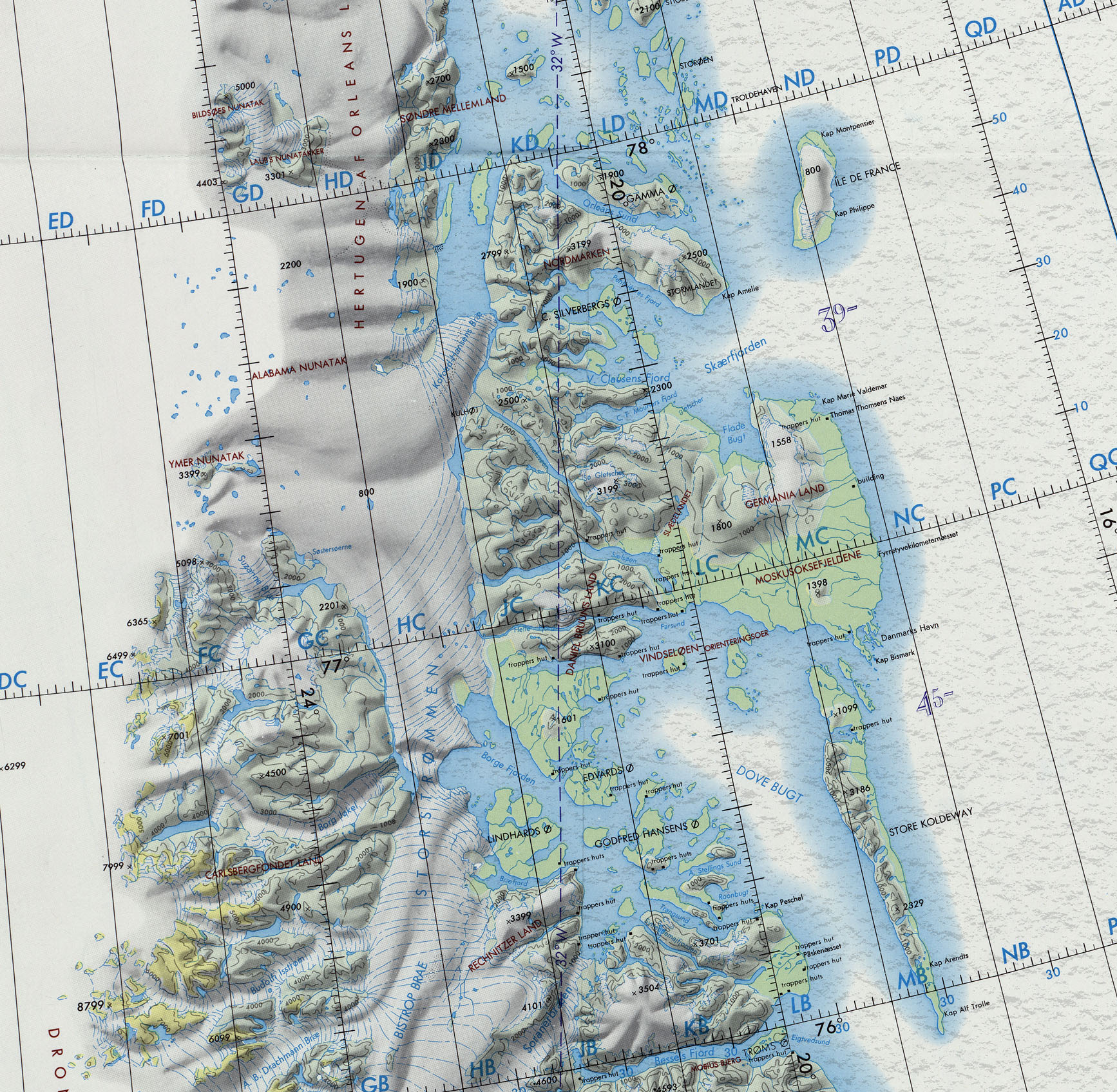
Map of Northeastern Greenland section.

== See also ==
- List of islands of Greenland
