= Gustav Karl Laube =

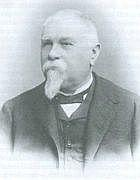
Gustav Karl Laube

Gustav Karl Laube (8 February 1839 – 12 April 1923) was a German Bohemian geologist and paleontologist.

== Biography ==
Laube was born on 8 February 1839 in Teplice, Bohemia. In 1871 he became a professor of mineralogy and geology at the technical university in Prague, and in 1876, a professor of geology and paleontology at the German Charles-Ferdinand University in Prague. Here, he was also director of the geological institute.

He was active in geological research of the Ore Mountains and neighbouring areas. He also served as geologist of the Second German North Polar Expedition (1869–1870).

He died on 12 April 1923 in Prague, Czechoslovakia.

== Written works ==
- Die Fauna der Schichten von St. Cassian (Vienna 1865–1870, 5 parts) – The fauna from the strata at St. Cassian.
- Die Gastropoden, Bivalven und Echinodermen des braunen Jura von Balin (1867) – Gastropods, bivalves and echinoderms in the brown Jurassic strata of Balin.
- Beitrag zur Kenntnis der Echinodermen des vicentinischen Tertiärgebiets (1868) – Contribution to the knowledge of echinoderms in the Vicenza Tertiary area.
- Über einige fossile Echiniden von den Murray Cliffs in Südaustralien (1869) – On some fossil echinoids from the Murray cliffs of southern Australia.
- Reise der Hansa ins Nördliche Eismeer (Prague 1871) – Journey aboard the Hansa to the northern Arctic Ocean.
- Hilfstafeln zur Bestimmung der Mineralien (2nd edition, 1879) – Auxiliary panels for the determination of minerals.
- Die Echinoiden der österreichisch-ungarischen obern Tertiärablagerungen (1872) – Echinoids from the Austro-Hungarian upper Tertiary deposits.
- Geologische Beobachtungen, gesammelt während der Reise auf der Hansa und gelegentlich des Aufenthalts in Südgrönland (Vienna 1873) – Geological observations, collected during the trip of the Hansa and from occasional stays in southern Greenland.
- Geologie des böhmischen Erzgebirges (Prague 1876–1887, 2 volumes) – Geology of the Bohemian Ore Mountains.
- Geologische Exkursionen im Thermalgebiet des nordwestlichen Böhmens (Leipzig 1884) – Geological excursions in the thermal springs region of northwestern Bohemia.
- Synopsis der Wirbeltierfauna der böhmischen Braunkohlenformation (Prague 1901) – Synopsis of the vertebrate fauna from the Bohemian lignite formation.
- Volkstümliche Überlieferungen aus Teplitz und Umgebung (2nd edition, 1902) – Folk traditions of Teplice and surrounding areas.
