= Mørkefjord =

Fjord in Greenland

- Vigfusdalfjord
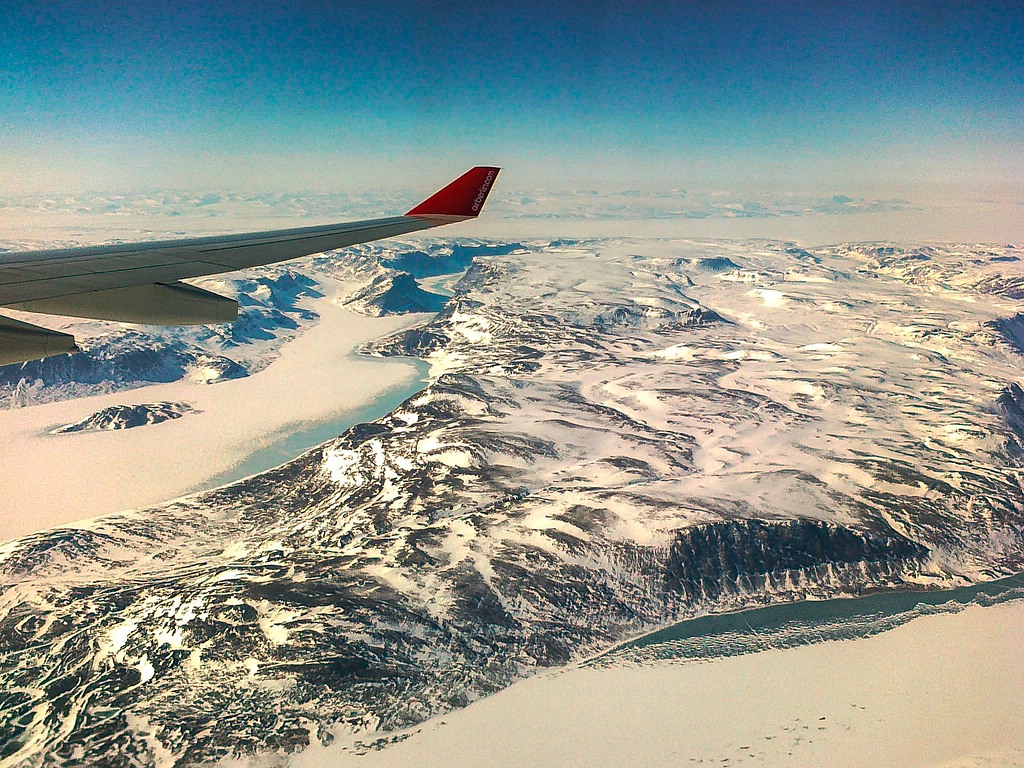
- Mørkefjord on the left, Sælsøen on the right

- Location in Greenland
- Location: Northeast Greenland
- Coordinates: 76°56′55″N 20°59′21″W
- Ocean/sea sources: Dove Bay, Greenland Sea
- Basin countries: Greenland
- Max. length: 30 km (19 mi)
- Max. width: 1.5 km (0.93 mi)

Mørkefjord, meaning in Danish "The dark fjord," is a fjord in King Frederick VIII Land, northeastern Greenland.

== History ==
Mørkefjord was named by the 1906-1908 Denmark expedition, which established a second weather station at Mørkefjord, in order to compare meteorological observations data with those taken at Danmarkshavn . It had also been known as Vigfusdalfjord.

The 1938–1939 Mørkefjord expedition was named after it. They built their base hut and repaired their ship "Gamma" at a place by the fjord's shores.

There are remains of Inuit sites at the mouth of the fjord.

== Geography ==
This fjord is located east of Danmarkshavn in Daniel Bruun Land. There are two parallel fjords close to it, Hellefjord to the south, and Sælsøen, a lake with a fjord structure, to the north. It runs from east to west for about 30 km. There is a small branch on its southern shore. Kalvenø island is located off its mouth in northern Dove Bay.

Map of Northeastern Greenland.

== Bibliography ==
- Spencer Apollonio, Lands That Hold One Spellbound: A Story of East Greenland, 2008

== See also ==
- List of fjords of Greenland
