= Skaer Fjord =

Fjord in Greenland

- Skærfjorden
- Location in Greenland
- Location: Northeast Greenland
- Coordinates: 77°26′N 19°11′W
- Ocean/sea sources: Greenland Sea
- Basin countries: Greenland
- Max. length: 40 km (25 mi)
- Max. width: 30 km (19 mi)

Skaer Fjord (Danish: Skærfjorden, meaning "Reef Fjord"), is a fjord in King Frederick VIII Land, northeastern Greenland.

== History ==
Skaerfjorden was named by the 1906–1908 Denmark expedition, which named it thus owing to the numerous reefs and skerries in it. It had also been known as Baie d'Orléans.

There are remains of Inuit sites near the mouth of the fjord.

== Geography ==
Skaer Fjord is located north of Danmarkshavn on the northern shore of Germania Land, with its mouth between Kap Kajak in the south and Cape Amelie in the north, southwest of Île-de-France's southern end. It is an irregular and broad fjord or bay with several arms extending westwards from it:

- Penthievre Fjord in the north with C. Silfverberg Island and Joinville Island on its southwestern shore and the Nordmarken peninsula in the north.
- Agsut Sound, off the southern shore of the islands.
- H.G. Backlundfjord, south of Agsut Sound; named after Swedish geologist Helge Backlund.
- V. Clausen Fjord, together with the previous fjord, roughly in the middle.
- C.F. Mourier Fjord, the southwesternmost arm.

All these fjords are roughly parallel, the northernmost ones running in a WNW/ESE direction. The southernmost one runs roughly from east to west for about 20 km.

- Flade Bugt is an arm of the bay located on its southern shore opening towards the north.

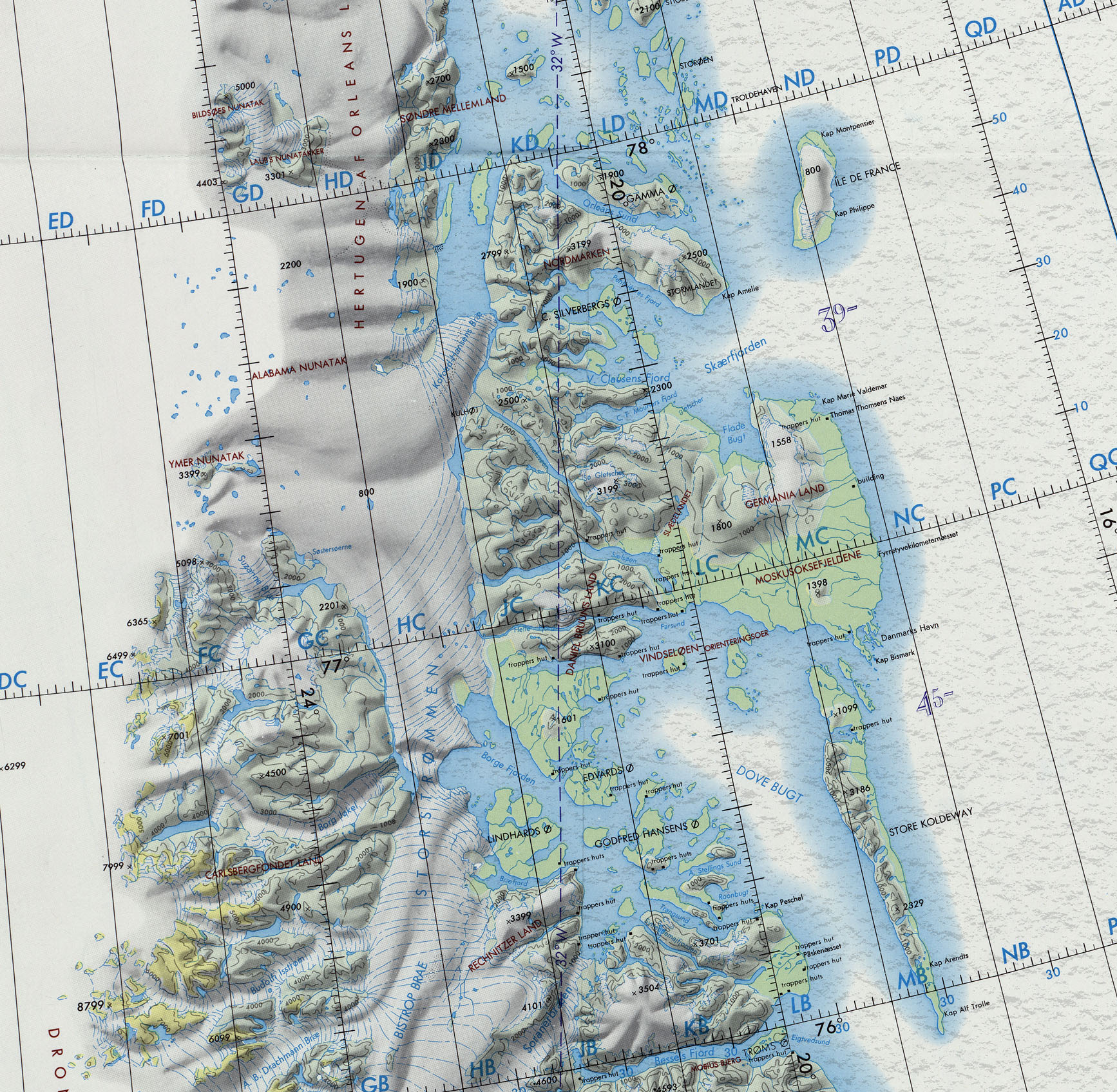
Map of Northeastern Greenland section.

== Bibliography ==
- Spencer Apollonio, Lands That Hold One Spellbound: A Story of East Greenland, 2008

== See also ==
- List of fjords of Greenland
