= Dove Bay =

Bay in King Frederick VIII Land, Greenland

- Dove Bugt
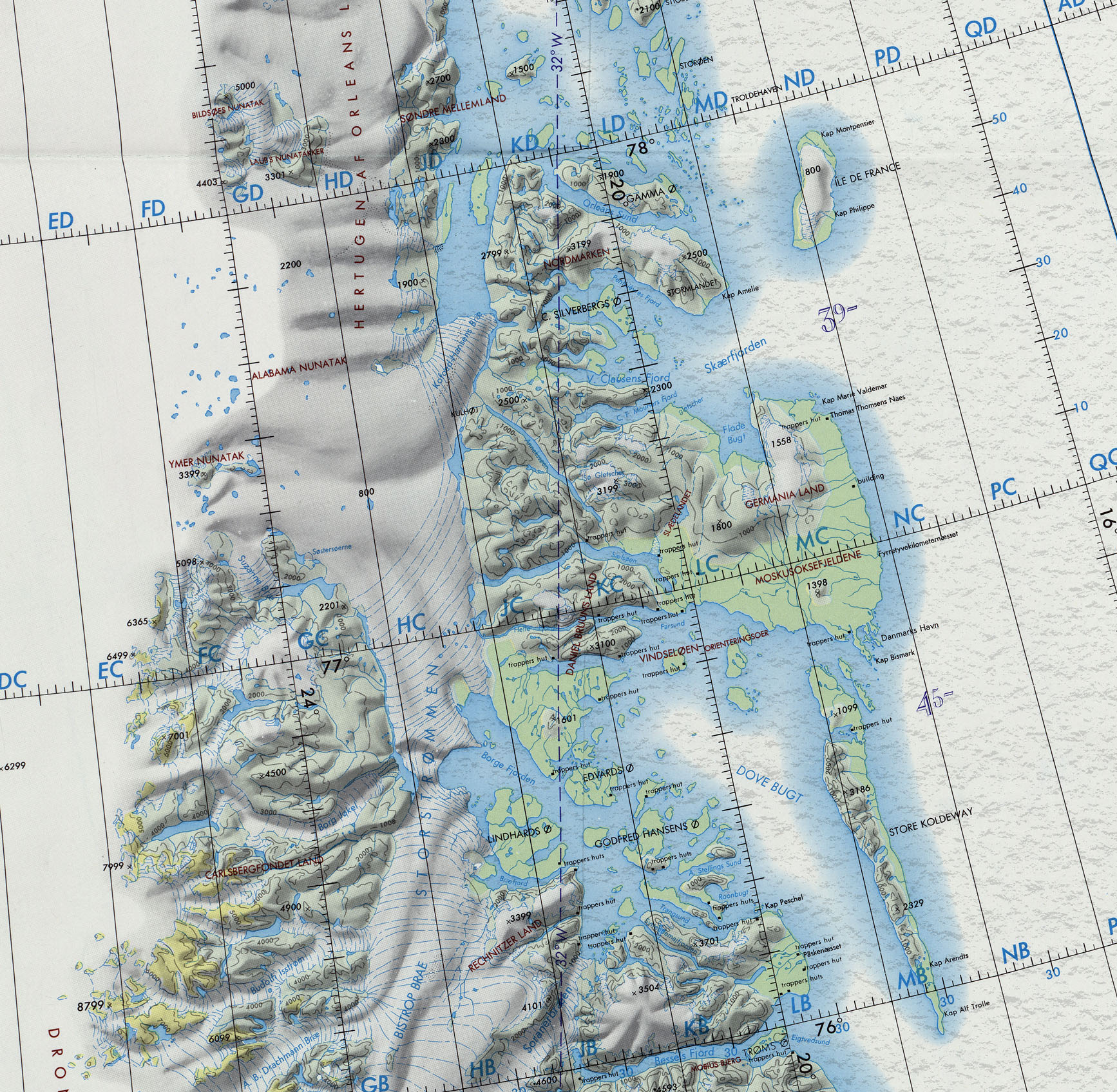

- Location in Greenland
- Location: Arctic
- Coordinates: 76°30′N 20°0′W
- Ocean/sea sources: Greenland Sea
- Basin countries: Greenland
- Max. length: 120 km (75 mi)
- Max. width: 35 km (22 mi)

Dove Bay (Danish: Dove Bugt) is a bay in King Frederick VIII Land, northeastern Greenland. It is part of the Northeast Greenland National Park area.

== Etymology ==
Dove bay is said to have been the legendary Breidifjòrdr of the Sagas of Icelanders.

It was named Dove Bai by the Second German North Polar Expedition led by Carl Koldewey after German physicist and meteorologist Heinrich Wilhelm Dove (1803–79).

== Geography ==
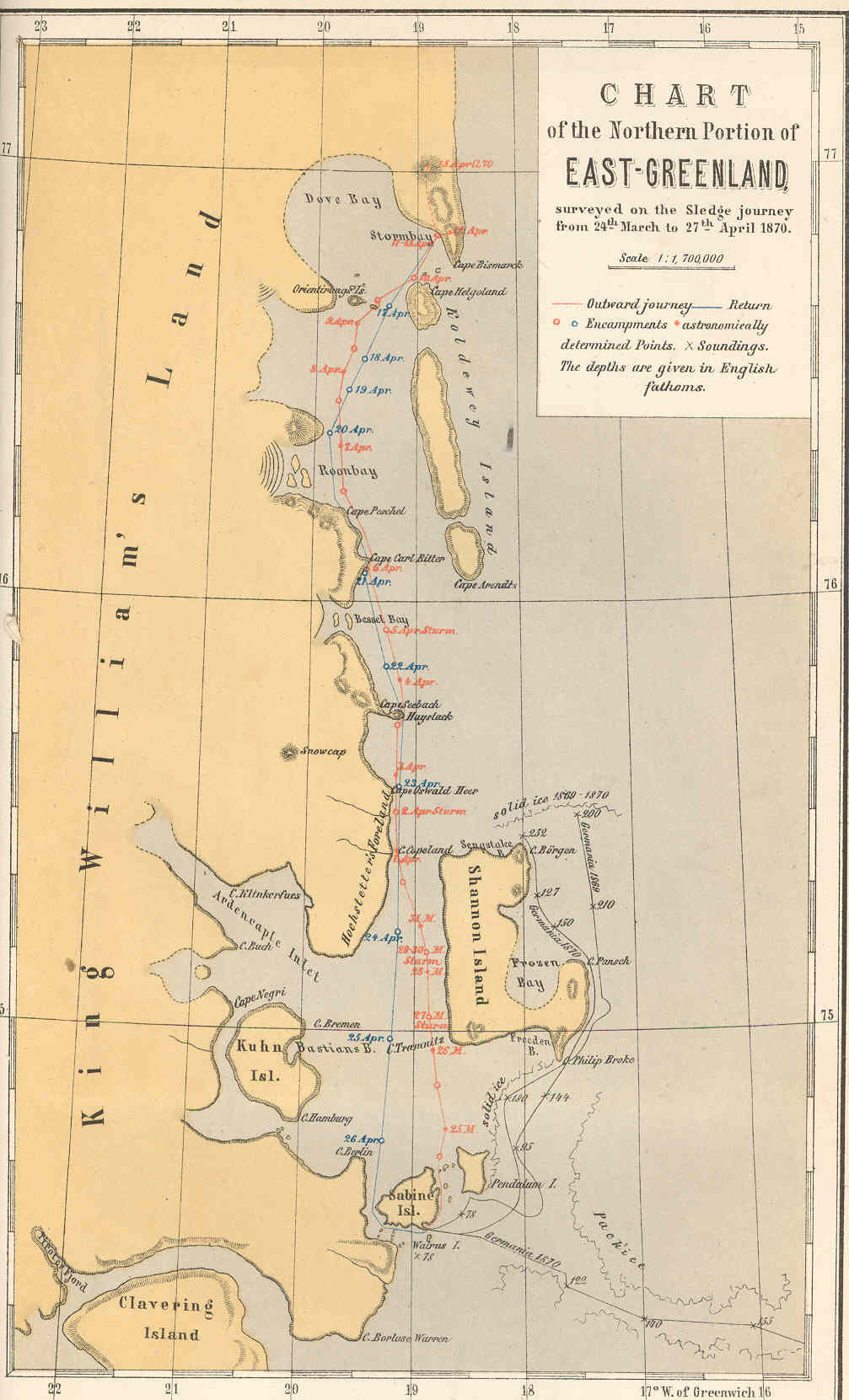
1870 map of the Northern part of Eastern Greenland showing Dove Bay

Dove Bay is a large bay located between Cape Bismarck in Germania Land to the north, a complex cluster of coastal islands to the west, Store Koldewey to the east and Adolf S. Jensen Land to the southwest. Besides Store Koldewey, there are numerous islands in the periphery of the bay such as Edward Island, Godfred Hansen Island, Lindhard Island, Nanok Island, Tvillingerne and Djævleøen —with its conspicuous Teufelkap. There are also fjords, such as the Mørkefjord and Hellefjord, having their mouth in the bay. To the south, the bay opens to the Greenland Sea through the Storebaelt (Store Bælt) strait.

The bay is usually free from ice in August and September. Its waters are deep.

The Danmarkshavn weather station is located north of the bay on the southern shore of the Germania Land Peninsula.

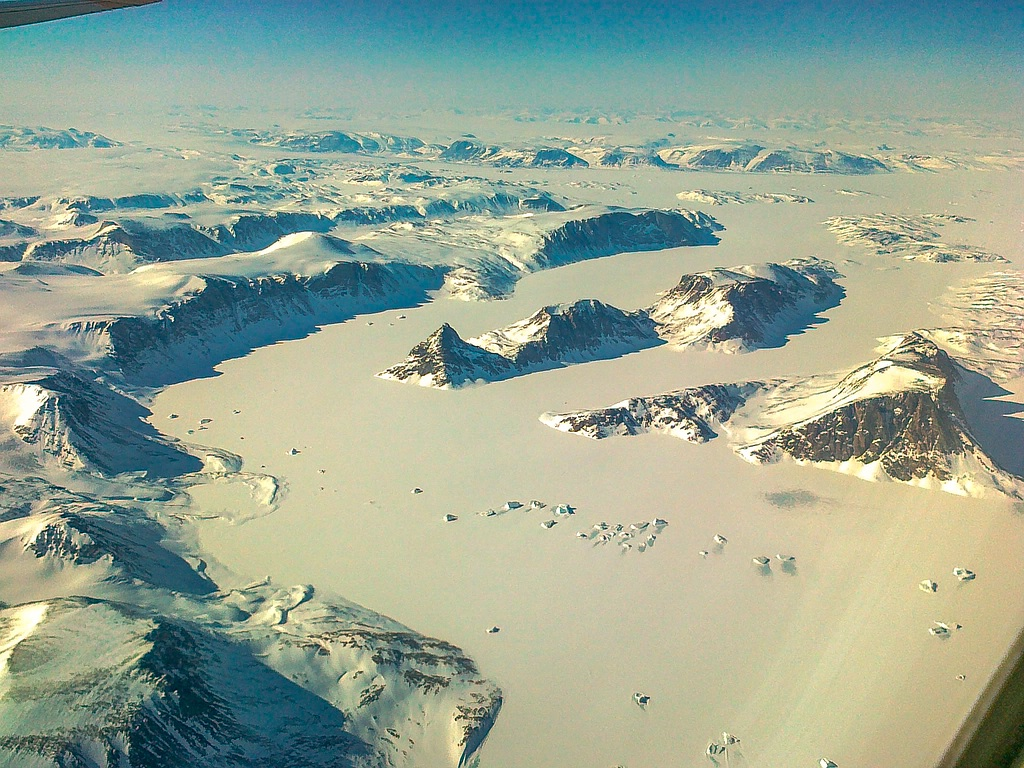
View of Vivian Fjeld on northern Adolf S. Jensen Land, Nanok Ø and Tvillingerne on the western side of Dove Bay

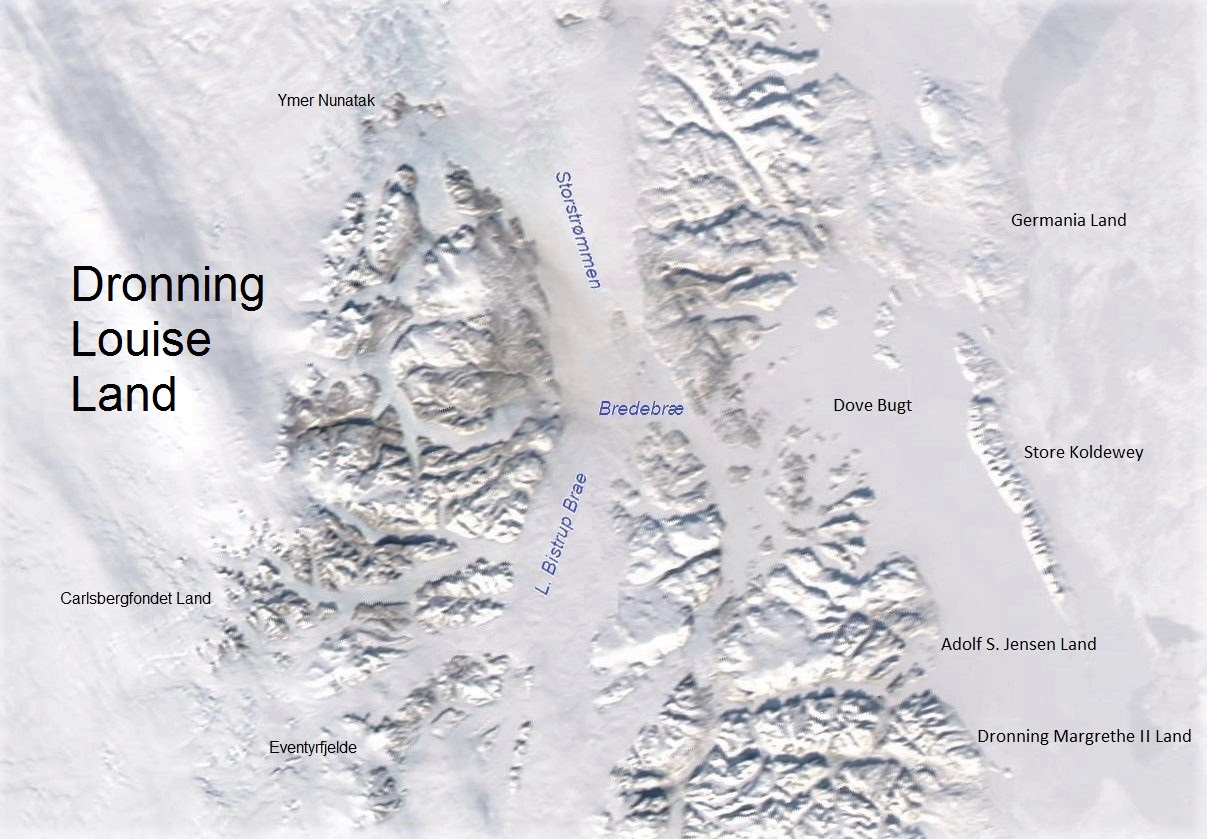
Dove Bay east of Queen Louise Land.
