= Germania Land =

Peninsula in Greenland

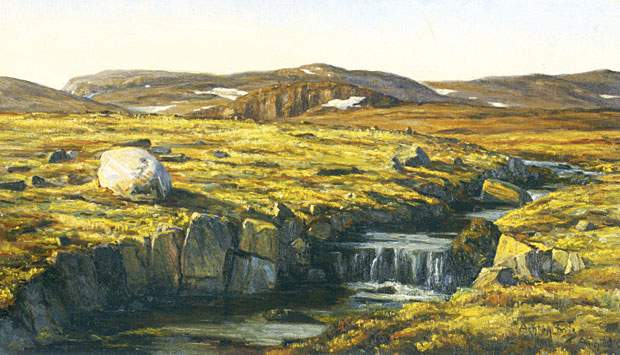
- Landscape of Germania Land in the summer.

- Location within Greenland

Geography
- Location: East Greenland
- Coordinates: 77°10′N 20°00′W
- Adjacent to: Skaerfjord; Greenland Sea; Dove Bay
- Length: 88 km (54.7 mi)
- Width: 54 km (33.6 mi)
- Highest elevation: 975 m (3199 ft)

Administration
- Greenland; Kingdom of Denmark
- Zone: NE Greenland National Park

Demographics
- Population: 6

Germania Land or Germanialand is a peninsula in northeastern Greenland. Despite the high latitude it is largely unglaciated.

== History ==
This peninsula was named by Ludvig Mylius-Erichsen, leader of the Danmark expedition, to commemorate its survey by the Second German North Polar Expedition led by Carl Koldewey in 1869 on the vessel Germania and as a compliment to Alfred Wegener, the German member of the Danmark expedition.

In central Germania Land there is a cairn erected by the members of the Second German North Polar Expedition on 15 April 1870 in order to mark the farthest northern point they reached.

== Geography ==
Germania Land is located in King Frederick VIII Land, in the Northeast Greenland National Park, between the Skaerfjord and Dove Bay. Store Koldewey island lies south of Cape Bismarck, the southeastern point of the peninsula. The Musk Ox Mountains (Moskusoksefjeldene) are a hill range located east of Hvalrosodden, a small peninsula. There are also two lakes with a fjord structure, Seal Lake and Annex Lake.

The Danmarkshavn weather station is on the southern shore of the Germania Land Peninsula. It was named by the 1906–08 Danmark Expedition after 'Danmark', the ship of the expedition which wintered there.

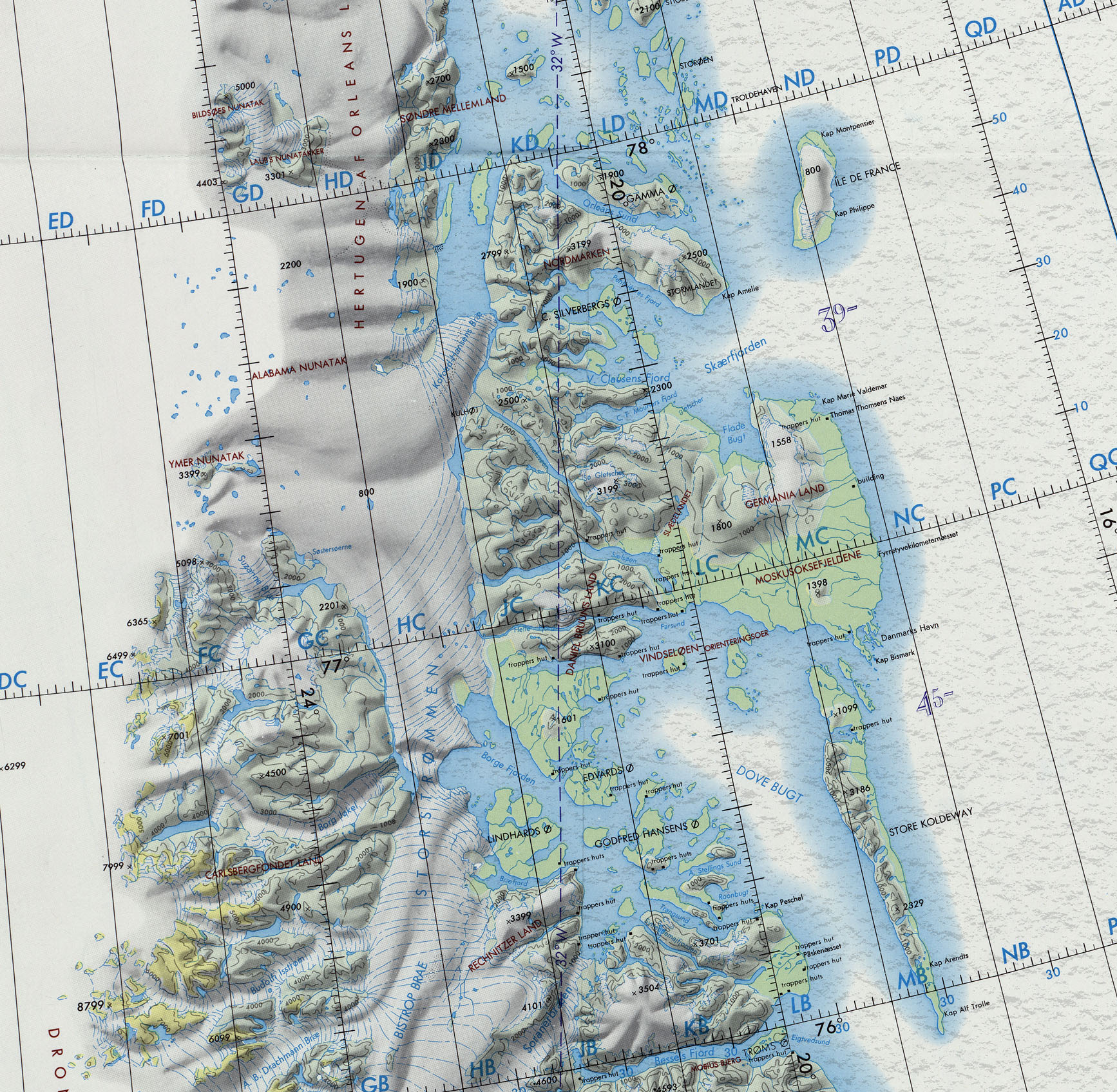
Map showing Germania Land

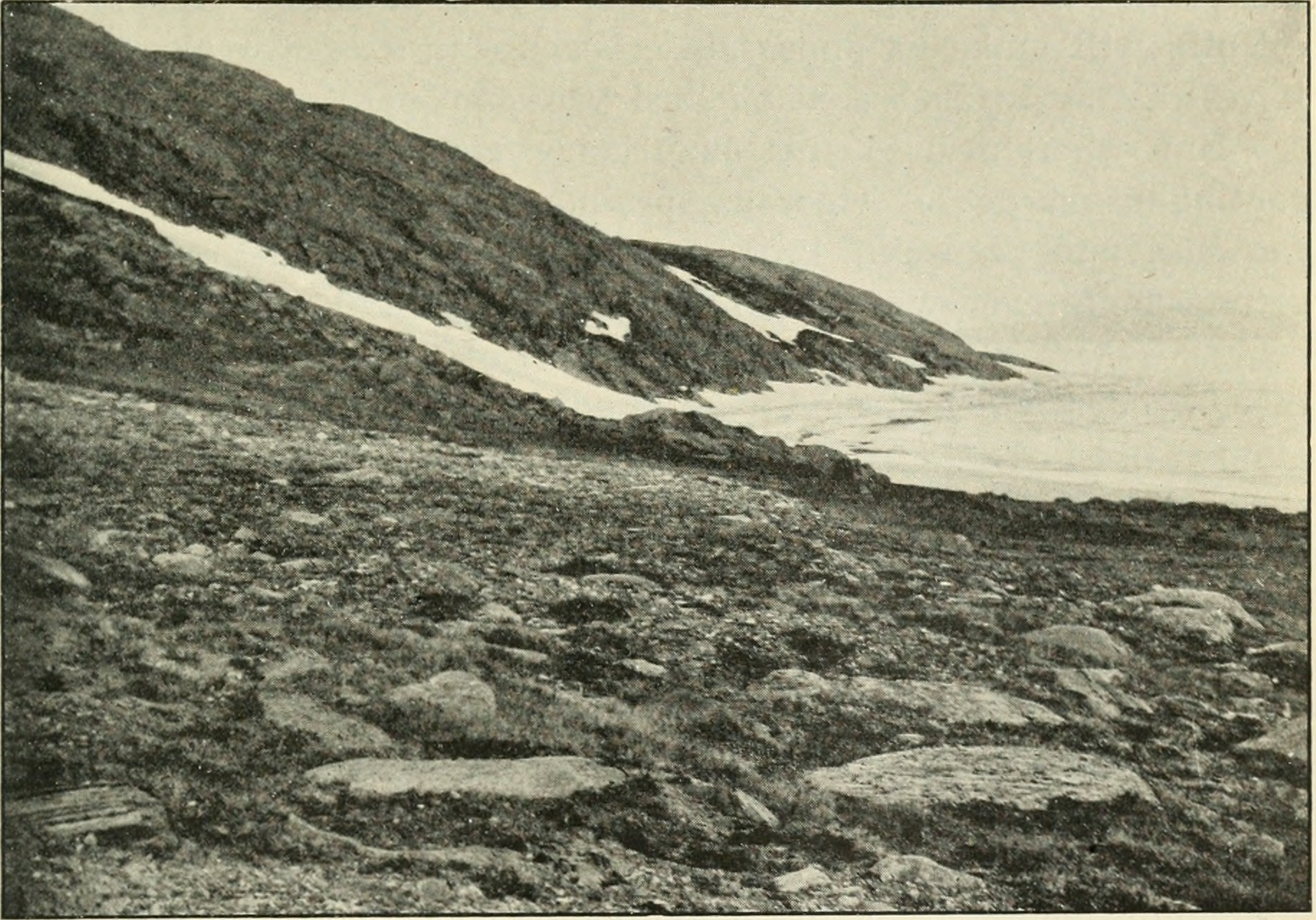
View of a slope with Dryas near Snenæs. From: Some Notes concerning the Vegetation of Germania Land

== Bibliography ==
- Koldewey, Carl (1874) German Arctic Expedition of 1869-70, and Narrative of the Wreck of the 'Hansa' in the Ice, London: Sampson Low, Marston, Low, & Searle
