= Store Koldewey =

Island in Greenland

Big Koldewey Island
Native name: Store Koldewey
- Location of Hovgaard Island in Greenland
- Interactive map of Big Koldewey Island
- Etymology: Named after polar explorer Carl Koldewey

Geography
- Location: Greenland Sea
- Coordinates: 76°22′N 18°51′W
- Archipelago: Koldewey Islands
- Adjacent to: Dove Bay
- Area: 654 km^{2} (253 sq mi)
- Area rank: 15th largest in Greenland
- Length: 65 km (40.4 mi)
- Width: 10 km (6 mi)
- Highest elevation: 971 m (3186 ft)
- Highest point: Mount Saint Petersburg

Administration
- Greenland
- Unincorporated area: NE Greenland National Park

Demographics
- Population: 0 (2021)
- Pop. density: 0/km^{2} (0/sq mi)
- Ethnic groups: none

Store Koldewey, meaning 'Big Koldewey', is the largest of the Koldewey Islands in King Frederick VIII Land, northeastern Greenland.

== History ==
The island was visited by the Second German North Polar Expedition 1869–70, led by Carl Koldewey and referred to as Grosse Koldewey Insel in the astronomy section of the expedition report, but this may not have been intended as a formal name.

The present island was shown on Koldewey's maps as three islands. However, the 1906–08 Danmark Expedition showed them to be connected and called the island Store Koldewey. Lille Koldewey is a smaller island to the northeast of its northern end.

In WW2, German vessels attempted to land weather stations along the eastern coast of Greenland. United States Coast Guard ships sailed the waters to intercept them in what it called the Greenland Patrol.

== Geography ==
Store Koldewey is the largest of the Koldewey Islands. It is a long and narrow island separating the Dove Bay to the west from the Greenland Sea. Between the island and the mainland —the Germanialand Peninsula— in the north there is a narrow sound and Lille Koldewey (Little Koldewey), a small double island, as well as some rocks. The southernmost headland of the island is Cape Alf Trolle.

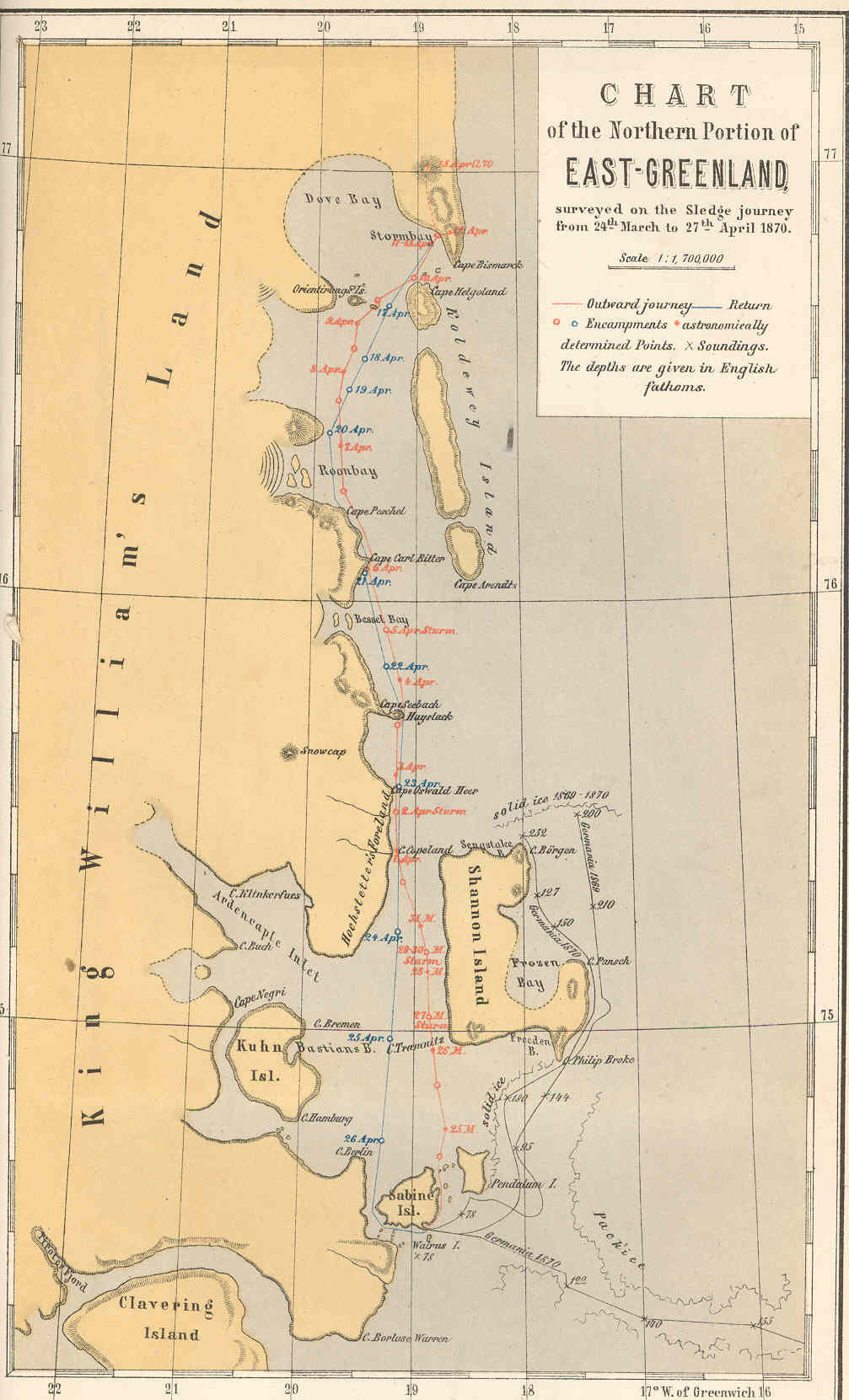
1870 map of the Northern Portion of Eastern Greenland showing coastal islands

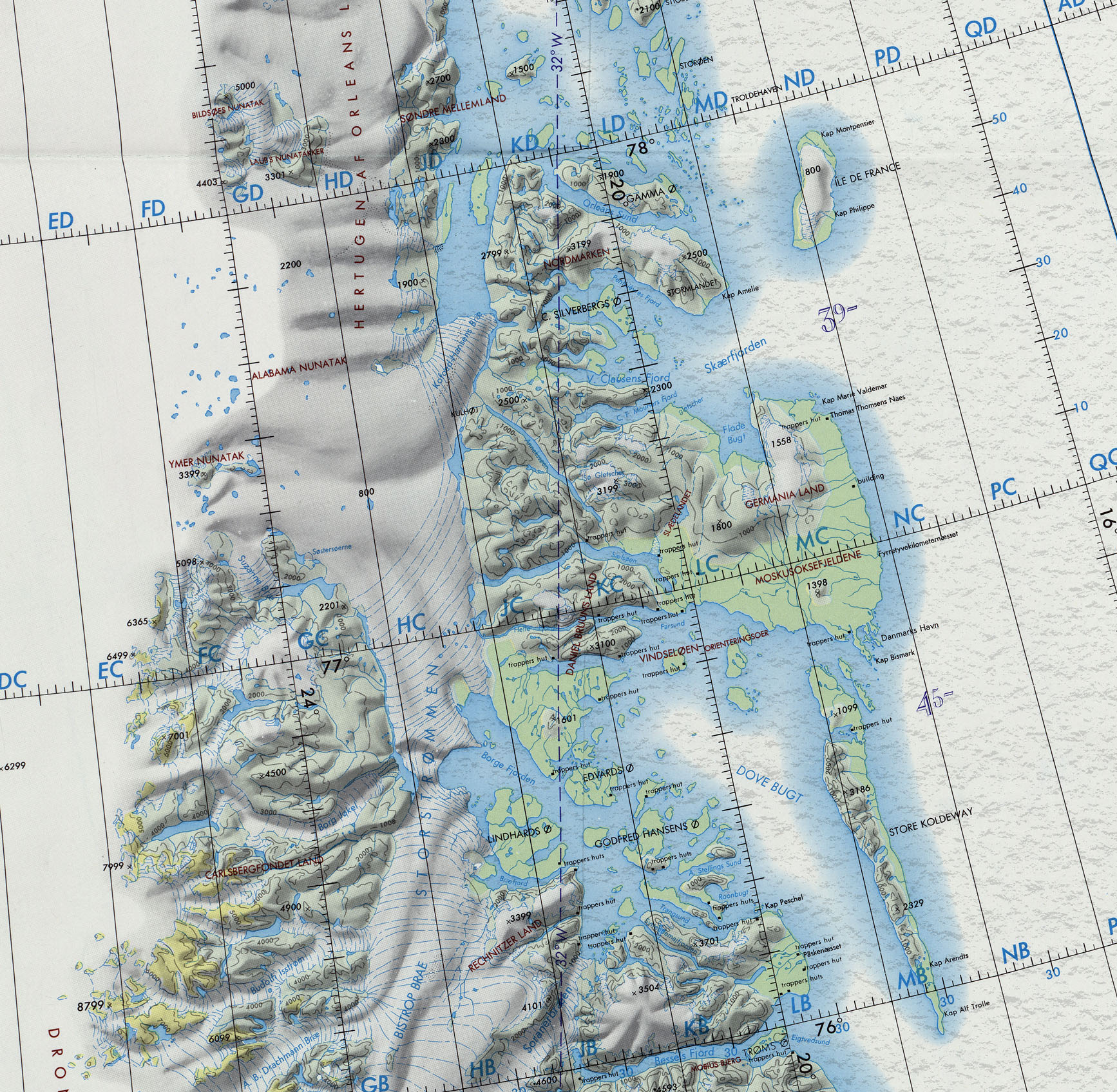
Map of Northeastern Greenland section.

== See also ==
- List of islands of Greenland
- Greenland in World War II
