= Seal Lake =

- Sælsøen
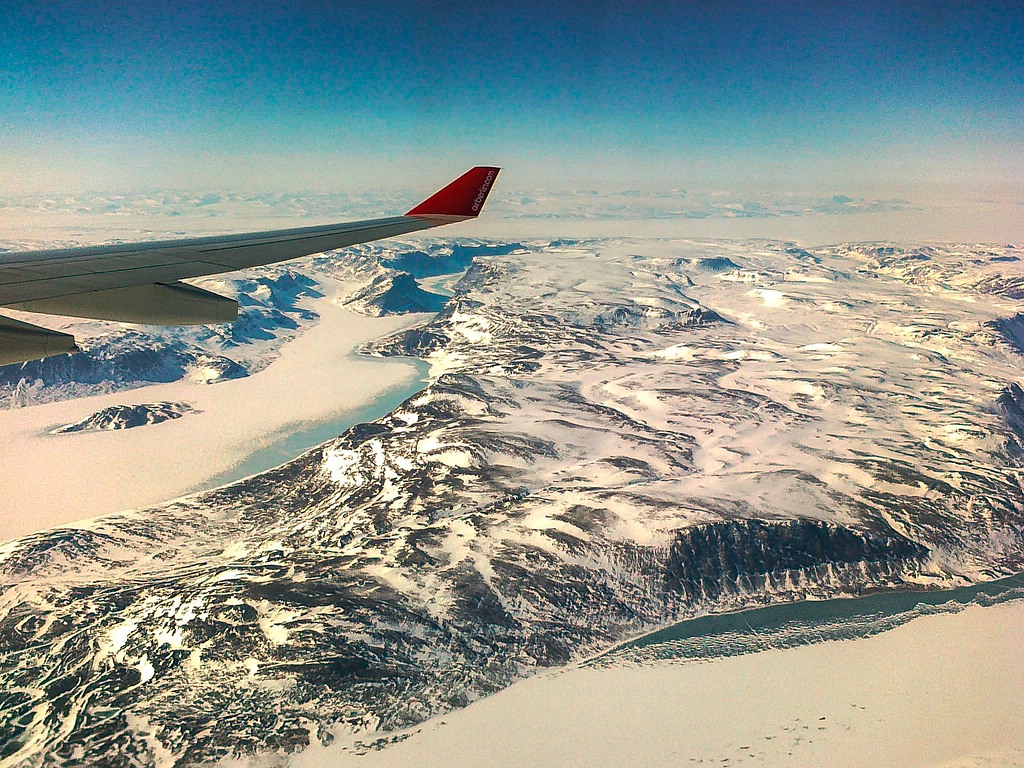
- Mørkefjord on the left, Sælsøen on the right

- Location in Greenland
- Location: NE Greenland
- Coordinates: 77°8′N 21°0′W
- Type: Lake
- Ocean/sea sources: Dove Bay, Greenland Sea
- Basin countries: Greenland, Denmark
- Max. length: 30 km (19 mi)
- Max. width: 3 km (1.9 mi)

Seal Lake (Danish: Sælsøen), also known as Sael Lake, Saelso, Saelsöen and Sælsø, is a land-locked freshwater fjord in southern King Frederick VIII Land, in Greenland's northeastern coast. The Danish weather station Danmarkshavn —the only inhabited place in the area— lies about 30 km (19 mi) to the east. The lake and its surroundings are part of the Northeast Greenland National Park zone.

The Seal Lake was named by the Denmark expedition to East Greenland 1906–1908. It was named after a seal which expedition members allegedly had seen swimming in it. Captain Alf Trolle reported, however, that the original name had been Store Sø (Big Lake) or Lakse Sø (Salmon Lake).

== Geography ==
Seal Lake is a lake with a fjord structure. It is located in the Germania Land peninsula to the north of the Mørkefjord. A short river discharges its waters in the northern shores of the Dove Bay of the Greenland Sea.

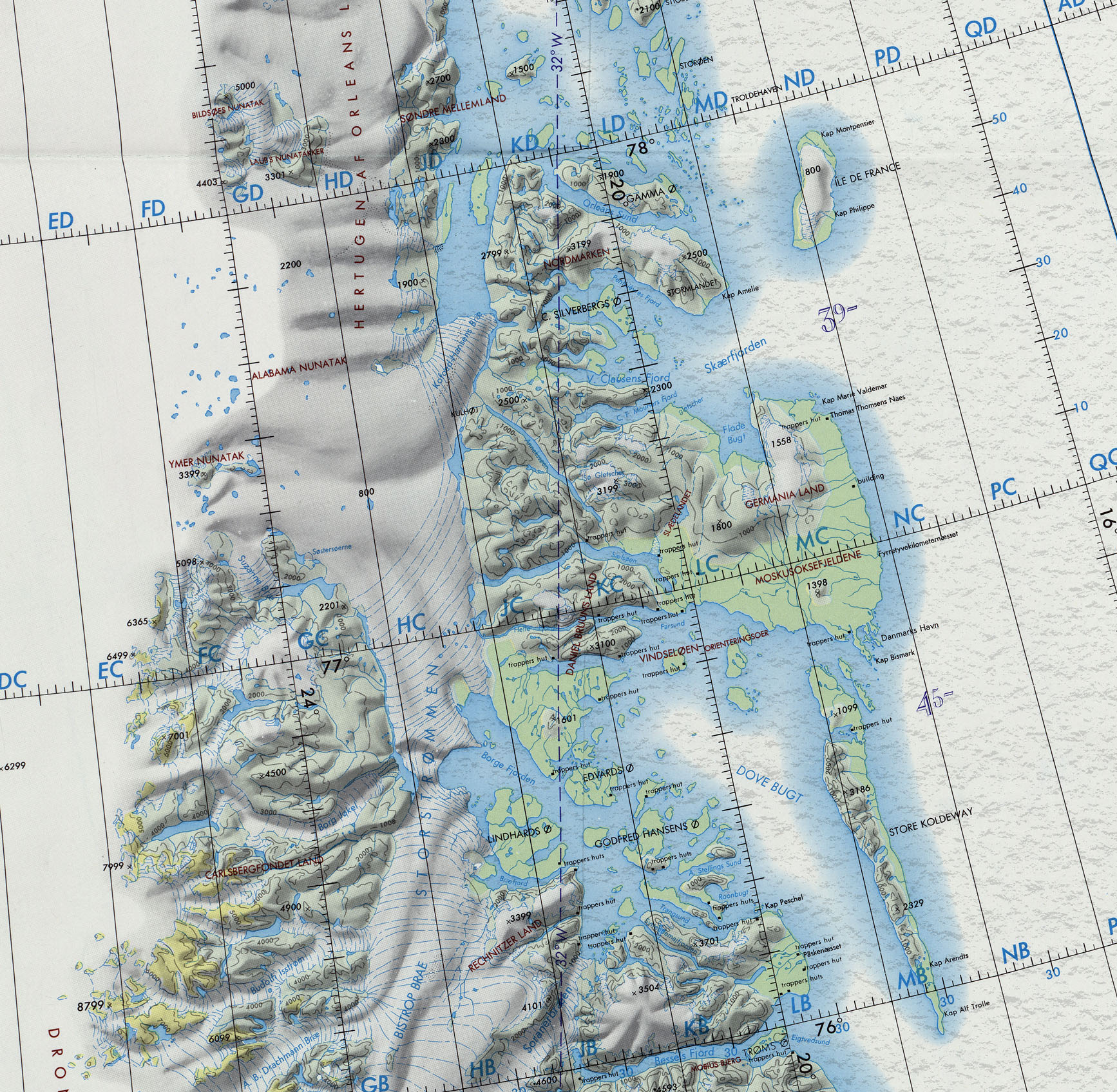
Map of Northeastern Greenland section.

== See also ==
- List of fjords of Greenland
