= Nanok East Greenland Fishing Company =

Danish company

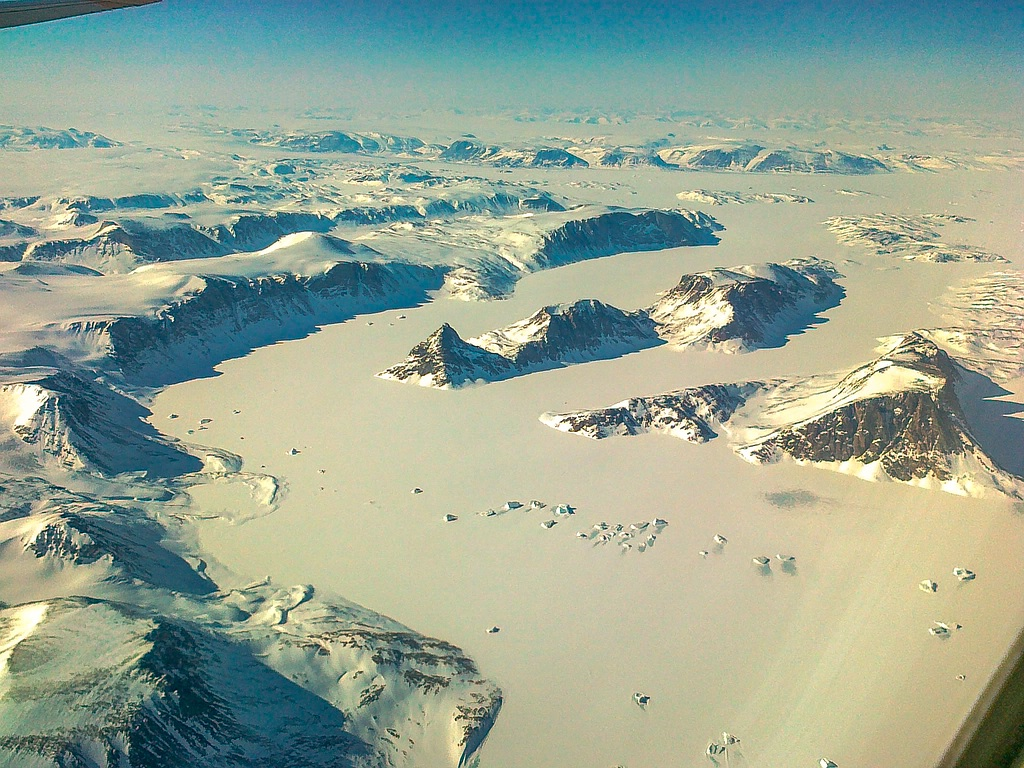
View of the SW Dove Bay. The island in the middle to the right is Nanok Ø, named after the company.

Nanok East Greenland Fishing Company (Note: Danish: Østgrønlandsk Fangstkompagni Nanok A/S (ØFNAS)) (1929–1990), generally known as Nanok, (Note: Derived from the word nanoq (meaning polar bear in Greenlandic)) was a Danish company in Greenland, mainly active in the hunting and trading of arctic foxes for their fur.

== History ==
Nanok was founded in 1929 by Johannes Gerhardt Jennov (1886–1980) with the aim to exploit natural resources in remote Northeast Greenland. It replaced the East Greenland Company (A/S Østgrønlandsk Kompagni) that had been founded in 1919. Right after its foundation in 1929 Nanok took over the Danish hunting stations that had been established by the former company. Nanok also built a number of additional hunting huts in the uninhabited expanses of NE Greenland and cooperated with Sirius Dog Sled Patrol, the other organization active in the desolate area. Although the initial emphasis was laid on fisheries, in practice the company became mostly active in the hunting and trade of arctic foxes for there was a big demand for their valuable fur at the time.

Nanok's assistance and expertise in the area proved very helpful for the scientific expeditions that visited NE Greenland in mid-20th century. The company lost significant revenues in 1952 when it ceased its lucrative fur trade operations. In the same year the Danish state withdrew its subsidies, after which the ailing company found it increasingly difficult to service the debts to its creditors and practically all but ceased operations. Jennov remained as Nanok's director from 1929 until 1976. Finally in 1990 the company became formally insolvent and was wrapped up.

Nanok Island (Nanok Ø), an island at the SW end of Dove Bay off the northern shores of Adolf S. Jensen Land was named after this company in the 1940s to commemorate its activity in the area.

MS Nanok S., a Danish supply and cargo ship, equipped for operating in Arctic conditions, was named after the company as well. There was also a US Coast Guard ship named USCGC Nanok (WYP-169) —a former fishing trawler of Boston, Massachusetts— serving in Greenland during World War II that was probably not named after the company, but after the polar bear.

== See also ==
- Cartographic expeditions to Greenland
- Erik the Red's Land
- Mørkefjord Expedition
