= Germania (ship) =

1869 German research ship

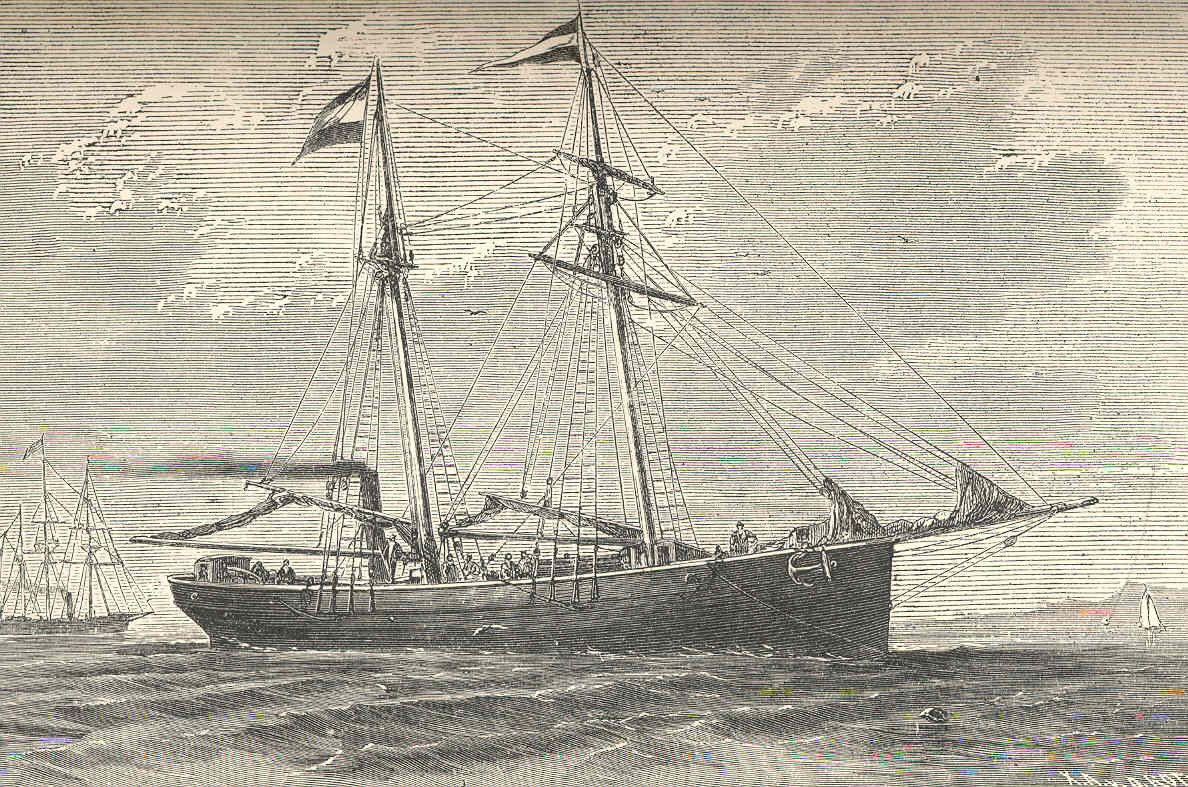

History

German Empire
- Name: Germania
- Owner: August Petermann
- Builder: Joh. C. Tecklenborg, Geestemünde
- Launched: 16 April 1869, Geeste River
- Out of service: 2 October 1891
- Fate: Run aground

General characteristics
- Class & type: Auxiliary schooner
- Displacement: 165 tonnes (162 long tons)
- Length: 30.48 metres (100 feet) o/a
- Beam: 6.86 metres (22.5 feet)
- Draught: 3.05 metres (10 feet)
- Propulsion: 30 PS (22 kW; 30 ihp)
- Complement: 15

The Germania was a German schooner built in Geestemünde, Bremerhaven, in 1869.

== Career ==
Fitted with an auxiliary steam engine, it was especially built as the main research ship of the Second German North Polar Expedition of 1869–1870 that explored northeastern Greenland. The captain of the ship was Carl Koldewey, leader of the expedition. Emperor Wilhelm I was present at the ship launching ceremony on 16 April 1869. The smaller schooner, Hansa—not fitted with an auxiliary engine—was the convoy and supply ship of the Germania during the expedition.

During the wintering period, Hansa was crushed by pack ice and sank. However, Germania managed to force its way through the ice, returning to Bremerhaven on 11 September 1870.

Germania took part in a further two Arctic expeditions, being refitted as a whaler in 1884. This former research ship ended its career after it ran aground during a hurricane on 2 October 1891.
