= Adolf Pansch =

German anatomist and naturalist

Adolf Georg Pansch
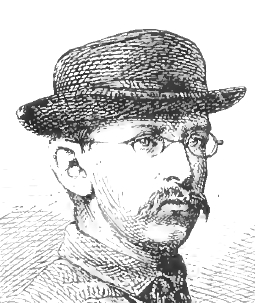
- Adolf Georg Pansch
- Born: 2 March 1841; Eutin, Grand Duchy of Oldenburg, German Confederation
- Died: 14 August 1887 (aged 46); Kieler Förde, German Empire
- Occupation: Naturalist
- Parent: Johann Heinrich Christian Pansch

Adolf Pansch (2 March 1841, in Eutin – 14 August 1887) was a German anatomist and naturalist.

Since 1860 he studied medicine and natural sciences in Berlin and Heidelberg, and from 1862 to 1864 he studied medicine in Berlin and Halle. After graduation, he served as a prosector in the anatomical museum at the University of Kiel, where in 1866 he began work as a lecturer to the faculty of medicine.

In 1869/70 he took part in the Second German North Polar Expedition, about which he published a few works involving the natural history of the Arctic. In 1874 he became an associate professor at the University of Kiel. He died at the age of 46 while on a sailboat excursion in Kieler Förde.

His name is associated with "Pansch's flssure", being described as a cerebral fissure running from the lower extremity of the central fissure nearly to the end of the occipital lobe.

== Selected works ==
- "De pyorrhoea alveolari seu gingivitide expulsiva", 1864 (thesis/dissertation, Halle-Wittenberg).
- "De sulcis et gyris in cerebris simiarum et hominum", 1866.
- Einige Bemerkungen über das Klima Pflanzen- und Thierleben auf Ostgrönland, 1871 – Comments on the climate, plant and animal life of eastern Greenland.
- Winter- und Sommerleben auf der deutschen Nordpolarfahrt, 1871 – Winter and summer life of the German North Pole expedition.
- Klima und Pflanzenleben auf Ostgrönland, 1874 – Climate and plant life of eastern Greenland.
- Beiträge zur Morphologie des Grosshirns der Säugethiere, 1879 – Contributions to the morphology of the cerebrum of warm-blooded animals.
- Grundriss der Anatomie des Menschen, 1881 – Outline on the anatomy of humans.
- Anatomische Vorlesungen für Aerzte und ältere Studirende, 1884 – Anatomical lectures for doctors and older students.
