= German North Polar Expedition =

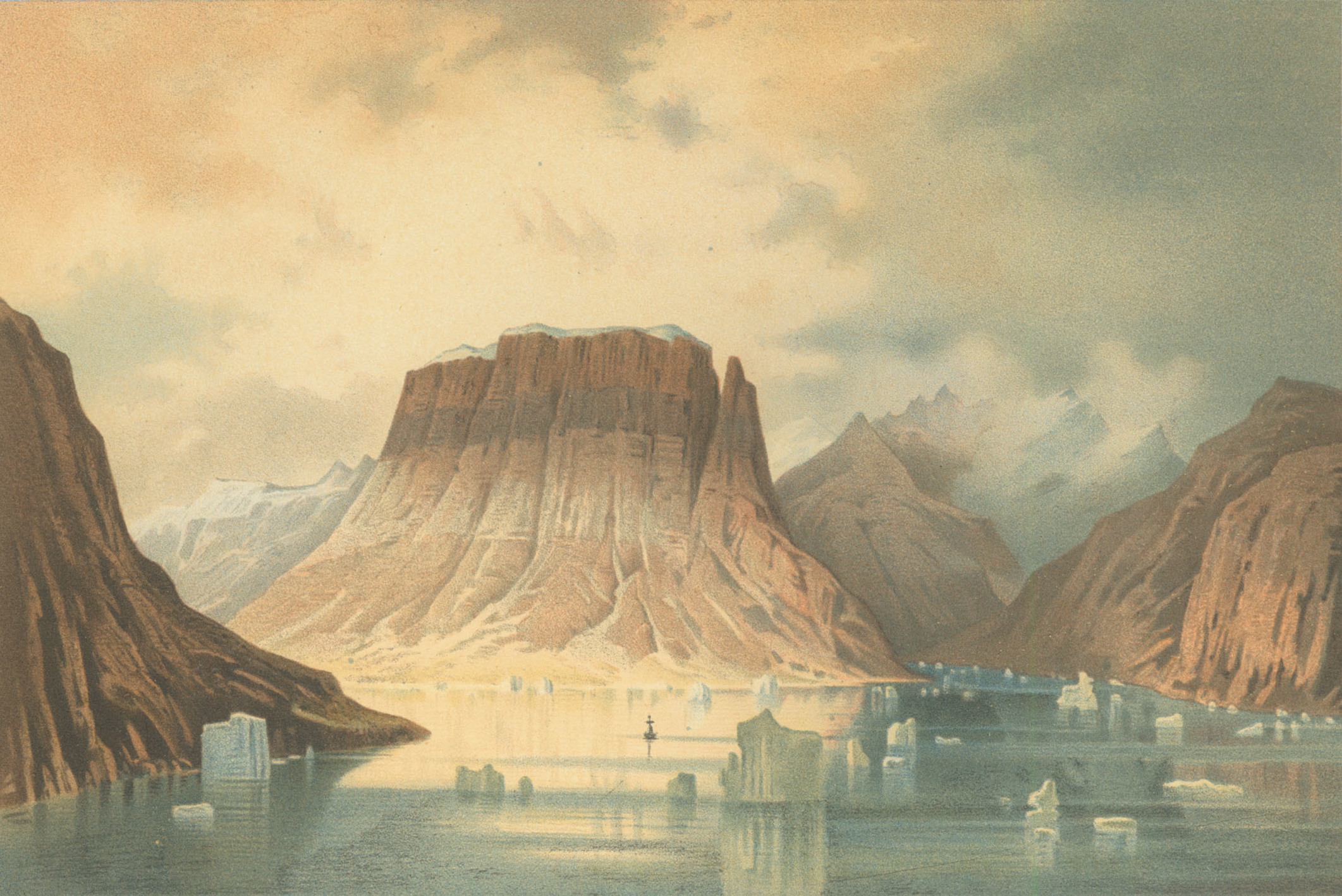
Teufelsschloss in Kaiser Franz Joseph Fjord

The German North Polar Expeditions were a short series of mid-19th century German expeditions to the Arctic. The aim was to explore the North Pole region and to brand the newly united, Prussian-led German Empire as a great power. In 1866, German geographer August Petermann wrote a pamphlet strongly advocating German participation in the international quest for the North Pole, which stimulated a German expedition.

== First German North Polar Expedition ==
The first expedition took place in the summer of 1868 and was led by Carl Koldewey on the vessel Grönland. The expedition explored some hitherto unknown coastal tracts of northeastern Spitsbergen, but did otherwise not lead to any new scientific knowledge. However, it served as preparation for the second expedition.

== Second German North Polar Expedition ==
The second expedition consisted of a two-vessel convoy:

- Germania – a schooner specifically constructed for the expedition, with a crew of 15 men commanded by Carl Koldewey
- Hansa – a smaller escort schooner reinforced for the expedition, with a crew of 13 men commanded by Paul Friedrich August Hegemann

The crew included two medical doctors, who were also capable naturalists: Adolf Pansch on Germania and Reinhold Wilhelm Buchholz on Hansa; astronomers and geophysicists Karl Nikolai Jensen Börgen and Ralph Copeland; Austrian cartographer Julius von Payer and Austrian geologist Gustav Karl Laube.

The expedition left Bremerhaven on 15 June 1869 and headed north. After a month, dense pack ice was encountered at approximately 75.5° N. The two ships got separated by mistake.

=== Vessels ===
==== Germania ====
Germania made it through the pack ice thanks to its auxiliary engine and, during late summer, explored the region around Sabine, Little Pendulum, and Shannon Island. On 13 September 1869 it was anchored near the south coast of Sabine Island for wintering. During autumn and the following spring, sledge trips were made Clavering Island and Tyrolerfjord to the south-west and as far north as Store Koldewey Island and Germania Land.

In late July 1870, Germania was able to raise anchor and continue north, however, only to find the way blocked by pack ice. After eight days, it was decided to head south instead, and extensive exploration of the vast fjord systems of north-east Greenland, most notably the Kejser Franz Joseph Fjord, was undertaken. Germania managed to get through the pack ice and returned to Bremerhaven, most of the way by sail after the engine broke, on 11 September 1870.

==== Hansa ====
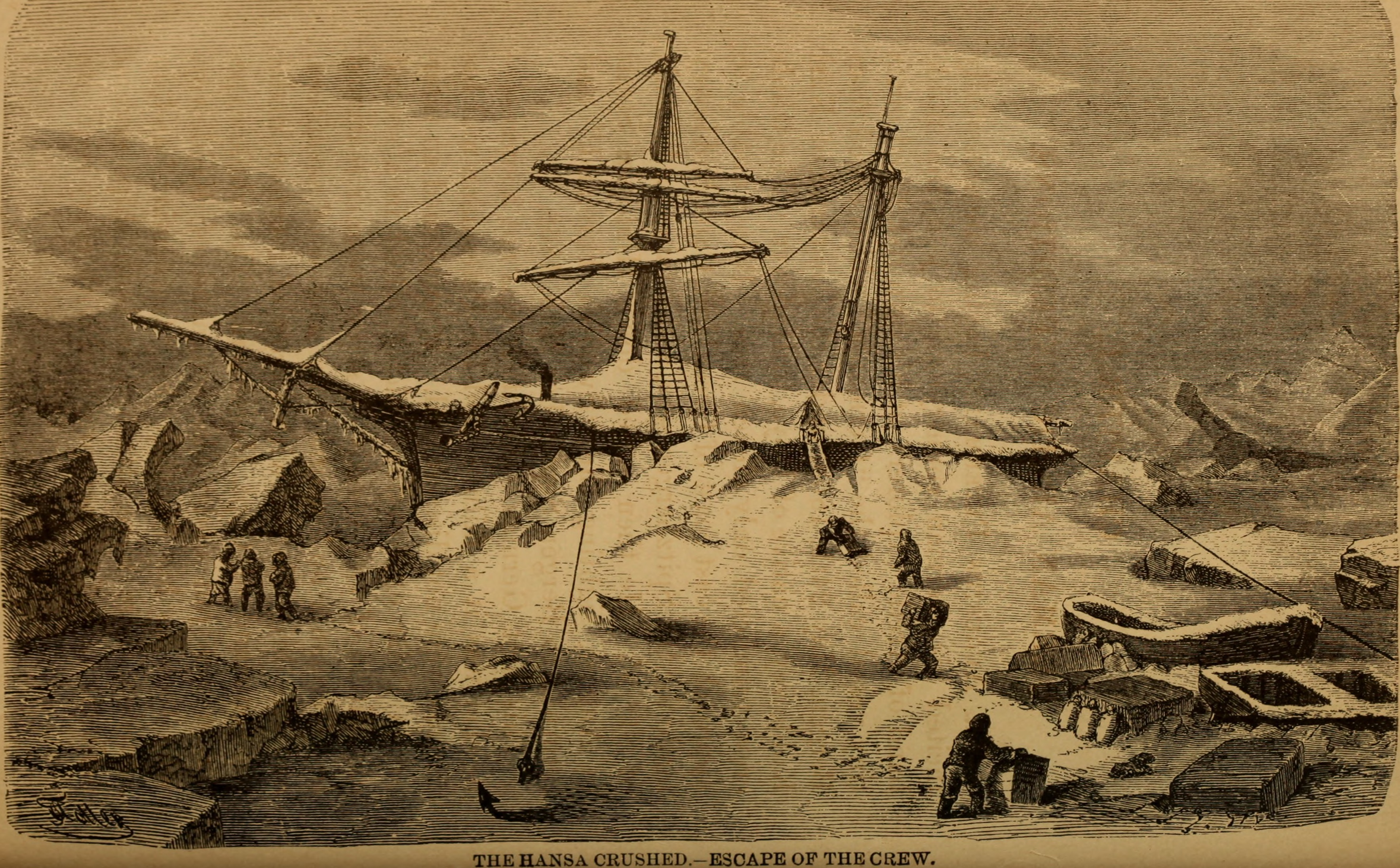
Hansa, crushed in the pack ice

As the supply ship, the Hansa followed the Germania until 19 July, when Hegemann misread a flag signal by Koldewey and went ahead; the ship disappeared in the fog and got separated. The agreement was to meet in such a situation at Sabine Island. After unsuccessful attempts to get there, Hansa was inescapably stuck in the pack ice by mid-September 1869.

During the next month, the ship was slowly milled by the ice and finally sank on 22 October at a position 70° 32’N, 21° W approximately 10 km from the East Greenland coast. The crew managed to survive the winter in a shelter built of coal dust briquettes, while drifting on the sea ice southward along the eastern coast of Greenland. In June 1870, the crew got to the coast by boat and finally were able to land near Cape Discord at Iluileq, a barren island off Danell Fjord in the southeastern coast. From there they followed the shore southwards until they reached the Moravian Herrnhut mission at Friedrichsthal (modern Narsaq Kujalleq) near Cape Farewell, from where they got back to Germany on 3 September 1870 on a Danish ship.

=== Botanical collection ===
Adolf Pansch made an extensive botanical collection during the second expedition. Collected vascular plants were later treated by the botanists Franz Georg Philipp Buchenau and Wilhelm Olbers Focke, both from the University of Bremen.

== Bibliography ==
- Murphy, D. T. (2002). German Exploration of the Polar World: A History, 1870–1940.
