= Carl Koldewey =

German arctic explorer (1837–1908)

Carl Christian Koldewey
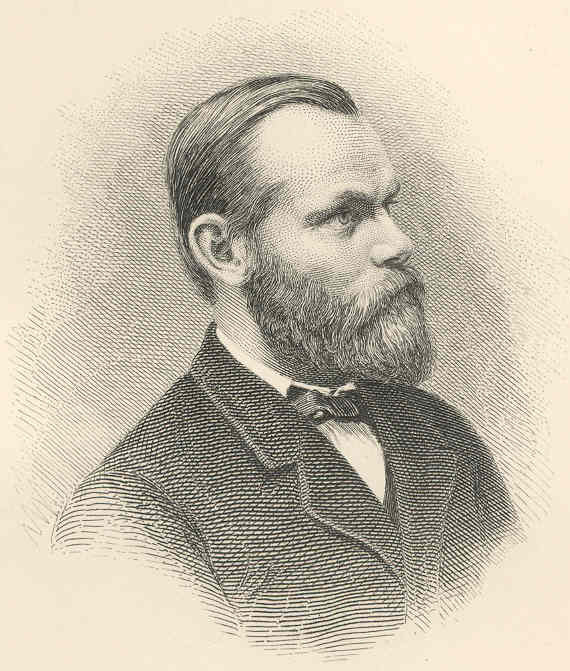
- Carl Christian Koldewey
- Born: 26 October 1837; Bücken, German Confederation
- Died: 17 May 1908 (aged 70); Hamburg, German Empire
- Occupation: Explorer
- Parent(s): Johann Christian Koldewey, Wilhelmine Meyer

Carl Christian Koldewey (26 October 1837 – 17 May 1908) was a German Arctic explorer. He led both German North Polar Expeditions.

== Life and career ==
Koldewey was the son of merchant Johann Christian Koldewey and his wife Wilhelmine Meyer. Koldewey enrolled as a sailor in 1853 immediately after Grammar school at Clausthal. At age 22, he attended the Naval school in Bremen, where he was among Arthur Breusing's best pupils. Later he went to sea again but returned to Naval school in 1861. After becoming a captain, Koldewey studied mathematics, physics, and astronomy at the universities of Hanover and Göttingen between 1866 and 1867.

== Expeditions ==
Through his teacher Breusing and encouraged by August Petermann Koldewey was given the leadership of the first Arctic expedition as captain of ship Grönland. He had the choice of either advancing northwards as far as possible along Greenland's east coast or to reach so-called Gillis-Land by travelling around Spitsbergen. But adverse conditions and strong ice floes prevented him from reaching both destinations. Finally he reached his northmost latitude of 81°5' near Spitsbergen and returned.

From 1869 to 1870 he was captain of the Germania and the leader of another expedition to Greenland and to the Arctic Sea which intended to penetrate into the Arctic central region. It was equipped with the propeller steamboat Germania and the sailing ship Hansa under captain Paul Friedrich Hegemann. Six scientists joined the expedition: astronomers and physicists Karl Nikolai Jensen Börgen and Ralph Copeland, zoologist, botanist and physician Adolf Pansch, and surveyor Julius von Payer. On the Hansa travelled physician and zoologist Reinhold Wilhelm Buchholz and geologist Gustav Carl Laube.

The expedition left Bremerhaven on 15 June 1869. Already on 20 July both ships were separated. The Hansa was crushed by the ice on 19 October 1869 and the crew saved itself on an ice floe. Meanwhile, the Germania reached Sabine Island on 5 August 1869. From there the task of mapping out of the coast between 73° and 77° northern latitude was undertaken by taking measurements from the ship or using sleighs and whalers. This work was a continuation of Edward Sabine's 1823 expedition. Trying to reach the North Pole, the Germania reached its northernmost latitude 75°30'N on August 14 northeast of Shannon Island, where they had to return on account of lack of leads in the ice. Payer carried out the mapping of Shannon island while the astronomers took latitude measurements on it. A wintering camp was established at Sabine island from 27 August 1869 to 22 July 1870. Advancing inland using sleighs, the islands and coast of Greenland were mapped. Further investigations were carried out that provide an insight into the magnitude of Greenland's mountains and glaciers. However, the actual highlight and most considerable geographical achievement of the expedition was the discovery and investigation of Kaiser Franz Joseph Fjord.

== Later work ==
After taking part in the expeditions, Koldewey worked as a writer and took part in scientific publications. From 1871 he worked at the German naval observatory in Hamburg, whose Nautical Instruments department he took over in 1875. On 31 July 1905 he retired as an admiralty's director. One of his nephews, Robert Koldewey (1855–1925), became a famous archaeologist and architecture historian.

== Posthumous honors ==
Places named after Carl Koldewey:

- Koldewey-Station, a German research station in Ny-Ålesund on Spitsbergen. It is run by the Alfred-Wegener Institute.
- Koldewey Island (остров Kольдевея) in Franz-Joseph-Land, Russian Arctic.
- The Koldewey Islands (Store and Lille Koldewey) in Greenland.
- The Kapitän-Koldewey-Grundschule, Elementary School in his hometown in Bücken, Lower Saxony, Germany.

== See also ==
- German North Polar Expedition
