= Regula Range =

Mountain range of Queen Maud Land, Antarctica

Regula Range (72°5′S 3°20′W) is a range of summits, including Flarjuven Bluff, Aurho Peak, Hornet Peak, and Snøhetta Dome, forming the southwest portion of Ahlmann Ridge in western Queen Maud Land. The name Regulakette after Herbert Regula, chief meteorologist with the expedition, was applied in the area by the German Antarctic Expedition (1938–39) under Alfred Ritscher. The correlation of the name with this feature may be arbitrary, but it is recommended for the sake of international uniformity and historical continuity.
