= Peters Bay =

Bay in King Christian X Land, Greenland

- Peters Bugt
- Location in Greenland
- Location: Arctic
- Coordinates: 75°18′N 20°8′W
- Ocean/sea sources: Greenland Sea
- Basin countries: Greenland
- Max. length: 20 km (12 mi)
- Max. width: 9 km (5.6 mi)
- Average depth: 55 m (180 ft)
- Settlements: Jonsbu, abandoned

Peters Bay (Danish: Peters Bugt) is a bay of the Greenland Sea in King Christian X Land, Greenland. Administratively it belongs to the NE Greenland National Park area.

== History ==
The bay was first surveyed by Carl Koldewey during the 1869–70 Second German North Polar Expedition. It was named "Peters Bay" (German: Peters Bai) after German zoologist and explorer Wilhelm Peters (1815 – 1883), who wrote one of the zoological texts for Koldewey's expedition report.

In 1932 a Norwegian hunting station was built on the western shore of the bay, about 15 km (9.3 mi) northeast of the mouth of Ardencaple Fjord. It was named Jonsbu (Jónsbú) after Norwegian trapper John Schjelderup Giæver (1901–1970). The station was destroyed by a vessel of the Greenland Patrol in World War II.

== Geography ==
The bay lies in Northeastern Greenland, by the southwestern shore of Hochstetter Foreland, part of Queen Margrethe II Land. The Ardencaple Fjord has its mouth to the SW of the bay, beyond Cape Klinkerfues. The southeasternmost headland is Karls Pynt, north of which lies Lauge Koch Cove (Lauge Koch Vig).

== See also ==
- Erik the Red's Land
