= Tindeklypa =

Mountain in Queen Maud Land, Antarctica

Coordinates: 72°5′S 2°22′W

Tindeklypa is a double summit separated by a deep ravine. The feature is located 1.5 km (1 mi) north of Istind Peak, on the east side of Ahlmann Ridge in Queen Maud Land. It was photographed from the air by the German Antarctic Expedition (1938–39), and mapped by Norwegian cartographers from surveys and air photos by the Norwegian-British-Swedish Antarctic Expedition (NBSAE) (1949–1952), led by John Schjelderup Giæver and air photos by the Norwegian expedition (1958–59) and named "Tindeklypa" (the summit ravine).
