= Strengen Valley =

Valley in Queen Maud Land, Antarctica

Strengen Valley (72°0′S 3°28′W) is an ice-filled valley, about 4 nautical miles (7 km) long, between Flarjuvnutane Peaks and Flarjuven Bluff on the west side of Ahlmann Ridge in Queen Maud Land, Antarctica (claimed as a dependency of Norway). Mapped by Norwegian cartographers from surveys and air photos by Norwegian-British-Swedish Antarctic Expedition (NBSAE) (1949–52) and named Strengen (the string).
