= Wilson Saddle =

Wilson Saddle (72°13′S 3°15′W) is a snow saddle between Kjølrabbane Hills and Aurho Peak in the southwest part of Ahlmann Ridge in Queen Maud Land. Mapped by Norwegian cartographers from surveys and air photos by Norwegian-British-Swedish Antarctic Expedition (NBSAE) (1949–52) and named for Ove Wilson, medical officer with NBSAE.
