= Aurnupen Peak =

Mountain in Antarctica

Geography
- Location: Antarctic Treaty area
- Parent range: Ahlmann Ridge

Aurnupen Peak (71°59′S 3°22′W) is a peak with a gravel moraine on the northwest side, situated 1 mile (1.6 km) north of Flarjuven Bluff on the Ahlmann Ridge in Queen Maud Land. It was mapped by Norwegian cartographers from surveys and from air photos by the Norwegian-British-Swedish Antarctic Expedition (1949–1952), led by John Schjelderup Giæver and named Aurnupen (the gravel peak).
