= Stamnen Peak =

Mountain in Queen Maud Land, Antarctica

Stamnen Peak (72°16′S 3°26′W) is a peak 1 nautical mile (1.9 km) north of Babordsranten Ridge, near the southwest end of Ahlmann Ridge in Queen Maud Land. Mapped by Norwegian cartographers from surveys and air photos by Norwegian-British-Swedish Antarctic Expedition (NBSAE) (1949–52) and named Stamnen (the prow). The ice plain Basissletta lies between Stamnen Peak and Pyramiden Nunatak.
