= Bredefjord =

Fjord in Greenland

- Location in Greenland
- Location: Arctic
- Coordinates: 75°35′N 21°45′W
- Ocean/sea sources: Greenland Sea
- Basin countries: Greenland
- Max. length: 40 km (25 mi)
- Max. width: 4 km (2.5 mi)

Bredefjord is a fjord in northeastern Greenland. Administratively it is part of the Northeast Greenland National Park zone.

Tundra climate prevails in the area of the fjord, the average annual temperature in the area being −14 °C . The warmest month is July when the average temperature rises to 1 °C and the coldest is January with −23 °C.

== Geography ==
Bredefjord is oriented in a roughly NW/SE direction and its mouth opens at the junction with the Smallefjord from the west into the Ardencaple Fjord, Hochstetter Bay, Greenland Sea. The large Stormgletscher and Ejnar Mikkelsen glaciers form a confluence at its head.

Norlund Land, part of Queen Margrethe II Land, lies to the north of the fjord and C. H. Ostenfeld Land to the south.

Map of Northeastern Greenland.

== See also ==
- List of fjords of Greenland
