= Kuhn Island =

Island in Greenland

Native name: Kuhn Ø
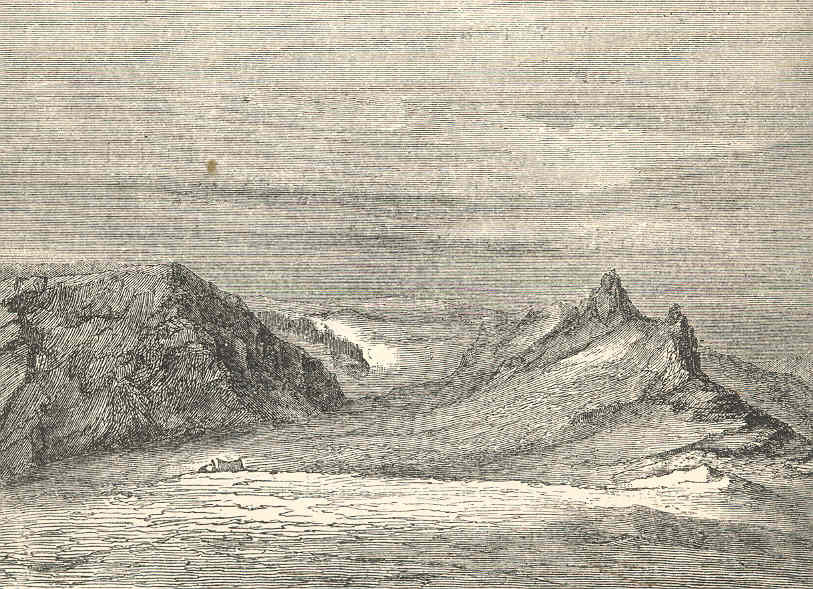
- Depot on Kuhn Island during the German Arctic Expedition of 1869-70

- Location of Kuhn Island in Greenland
- Interactive map of Kuhn Island
- Etymology: Named after the Austro-Hungarian minister of war Franz Kuhn von Kuhnenfeld

Geography
- Location: Greenland Sea
- Coordinates: 74°53′N 20°15′W
- Area: 634 km^{2} (245 sq mi)
- Area rank: 12th largest in Greenland
- Highest elevation: 1,136 m (3727 ft)
- Highest point: Schwarze Wand

Administration
- Greenland
- Unincorporated area: Northeast Greenland National Park

Demographics
- Population: 0 (2021)
- Pop. density: 0/km^{2} (0/sq mi)
- Ethnic groups: none

Kuhn Island (Danish: Kuhn Ø) is a coastal island in Hochstetter Bay, eastern Greenland. There are coal deposits on the island.

The island was discovered by the Second German North Polar Expedition (1869-1870) and is named after Franz Kuhn von Kuhnenfeld, the Austro-Hungarian minister of war, who was a patron of the expedition's cartographer, Julius von Payer.

== Geography ==
This island lies to the north of Wollaston Foreland, separated from Thomas Thomsen Land in the mainland by a narrow sound, the Fligely Fjord. The Lindeman Fjord has its mouth to the southwest and the Hochstetter Bay of the Greenland Sea lies to the east. The mouths of Ardencaple Fjord and Grandjean Fjord open to the north.

The islands that are located further off the shore in the bay are Shannon Island to the NE and the Pendulum Islands to the SE.

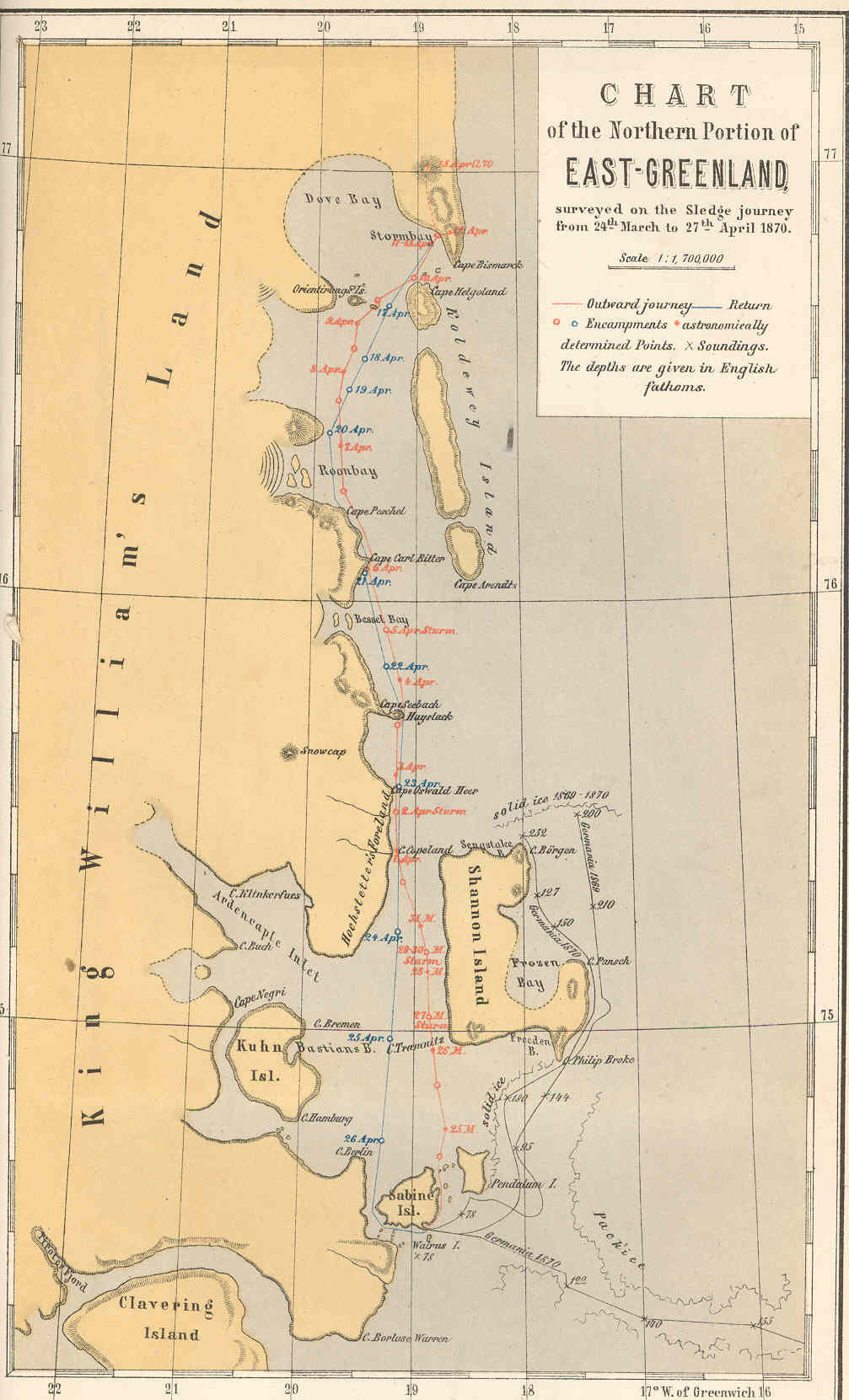
1870 map of the Northern Portion of Eastern Greenland showing coastal islands.

Map of Northeastern Greenland.

== See also ==
- List of islands of Greenland
