= Hornet Peak =

Mountain in Queen Maud Land, Antarctica

Hornet Peak (72°12′S 2°59′W) is a sharp peak 3 nautical miles (6 km) west of Snøhetta Dome, near the south end of Ahlmann Ridge in Queen Maud Land, Antarctica. It was mapped by Norwegian cartographers from surveys and air photos by the Norwegian–British–Swedish Antarctic Expedition (1959–52) and from air photos by the Norwegian expedition (1958–59) and named Hornet (the horn). Confusingly, it is located only a few kilometres from its near-namesake, Horten Peak.
