= Fligely Fjord =

Fjord in Greenland

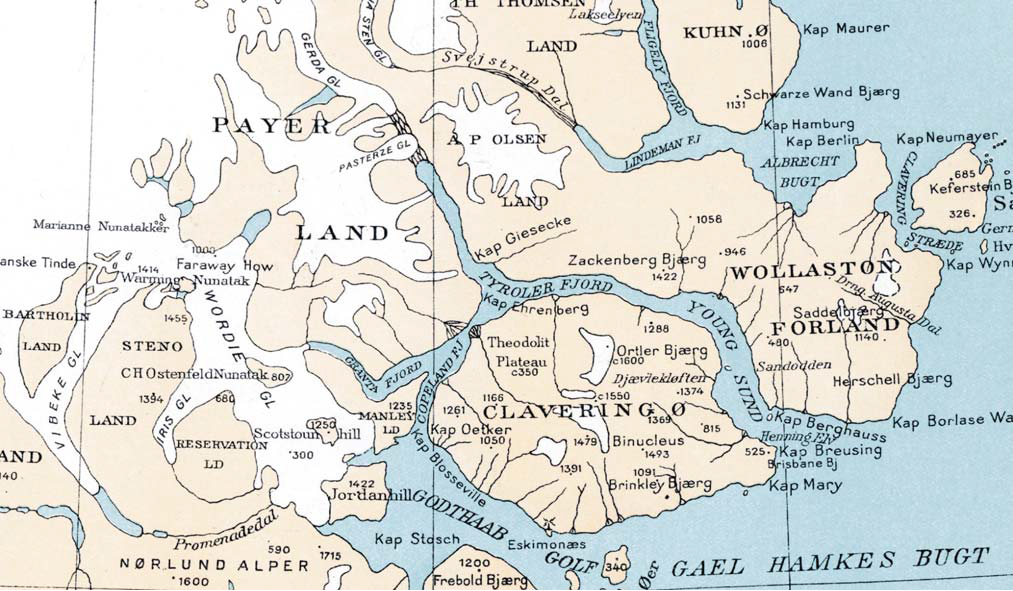
- Map section showing the southern part of Fligely Fjord at the top.

- Location in Greenland
- Location: Arctic
- Coordinates: 74°56′N 20°37′W
- Ocean/sea sources: Lindeman Fjord; Hochstetter Bay; Greenland Sea
- Basin countries: Greenland
- Max. length: 40 kilometres (25 mi)
- Max. width: 4 kilometres (2.5 mi)
- Frozen: Most of the year
- Settlements: A few hunting huts

Fligely Fjord is a fjord in King Christian X Land, East Greenland. Administratively it is part of the Northeast Greenland National Park zone.

== History ==
The fjord was first surveyed by Carl Koldewey during the 1869–70 Second German North Polar Expedition. Koldewey named it after Austrian cartographer Field Marshal August von Fligely (1810–1879).

There are a number of hunter cabins in the shores of the fjord.

== Geography ==
Fligely Fjord is a marine channel with a fjord structure that stretches west of Kuhn Island and north of the mouth area of Lindeman Fjord. It forms the western shore of the island and to the west the eastern shore of Thomas Thomsen Land. The mouth of Grandjean Fjord lies west of the fjord's northern end.

The fjord is about 4 kilometres (2.5 mi) wide in its widest part and stretches from north to south for about 40 kilometres (25 mi).

Map of Northeastern Greenland

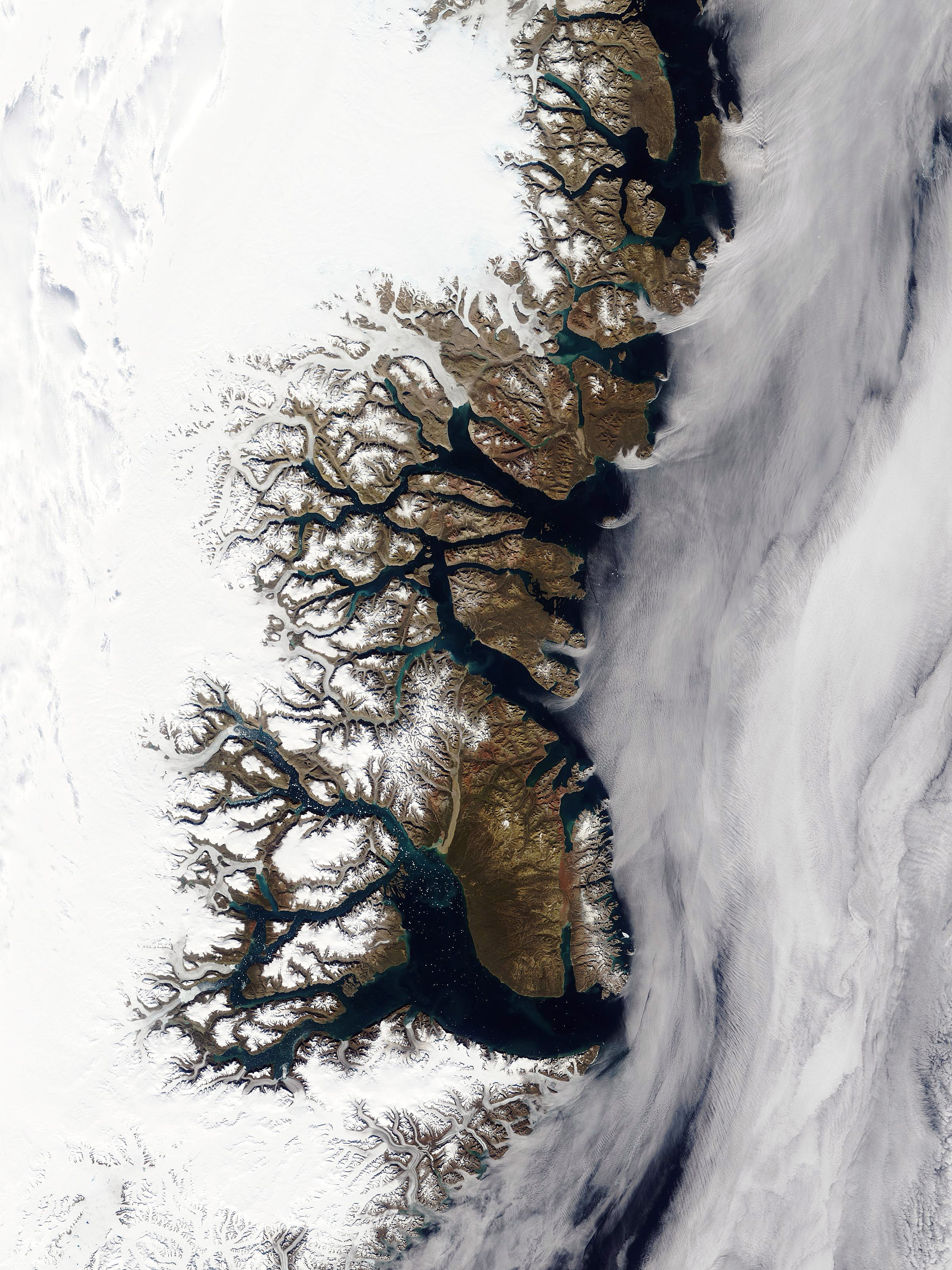
East Greenland Terra/MODIS satellite image

== See also ==
- List of fjords of Greenland
