= Nupshamrane Peaks =

Mountains in Queen Maud Land, Antarctica

The Nupshamrane Peaks (71°57′S 3°20′W) are peaks just east of the Klumpane Peaks, on the west side of the Ahlmann Ridge in Queen Maud Land. Mapped by Norwegian cartographers from surveys and air photos by the Norwegian-British-Swedish Antarctic Expedition (NBSAE) (1949–52) and was named Nupshamrane (the high peaks).
