= Babordsranten Ridge =

Ridge in Antarctica

Babordsranten Ridge (72°17′S 3°26′W) is a small ridge 1 nautical mile (2 km) south of Stamnen Peak, at the southwest end of Ahlmann Ridge in Queen Maud Land. It was mapped by Norwegian cartographers from surveys and from air photos by the Norwegian-British-Swedish Antarctic Expedition (1949–52) and named "Babordsranten" (the "port side ridge"). It has an altitude of 1620 meters.
