= Ardencaple Fjord =

Fjord in Greenland

- Location in Greenland
- Location: Northeast Greenland
- Coordinates: 75°17′16″N 20°47′49″W
- Ocean/sea sources: Hochstetter Bay, Greenland Sea
- Basin countries: Greenland
- Max. length: 50 km (31 mi)
- Max. width: 6 km (3.7 mi)

Ardencaple Fjord is a fjord in King Christian X Land, northeastern Greenland. Administratively it is part of the Northeast Greenland National Park.

== History ==
Ardencaple Fjord was named by Douglas Clavering as "Ardencaple Inlet" in 1823, but the inner fjord would remain inaccessible for almost a century.

The Second German Polar Expedition under Carl Koldewey in 1869-70 visited the area but could not enter the fjord on account of deep snow. In April 1908 the Denmark expedition sent and exploration team to survey Ardencaple Fjord, which had not yet been mapped because previous expeditions were not able to go beyond its mouth.

== Geography ==
This fjord is located between Queen Margrethe II Land and C.H. Ostenfeld Land, west of Shannon Island. It divides in two fjord branches in its inner part, Bredefjord and Smallefjord. It runs roughly from northeast to west for about 50 km. Its mouth is in Hochstetter Bay, north of Kuhn Island and of the mouth of Grandjean Fjord. Peters Bay, where Jónsbú Station formerly stood, lies to the northeast of the fjord's mouth, beyond Cape Klinkerfues.

Map of Northeastern Greenland.

== See also ==
- List of fjords of Greenland
