= Liljequist Heights =

Mountain in Queen Maud Land, Antarctica

The Liljequist Heights (72°6′S 2°48′W) are the heights about 2 nautical miles (4 km) south of the Grunehogna Peaks, in the Ahlmann Ridge of Queen Maud Land, Antarctica. They were mapped by Norwegian cartographers from surveys and air photos by the Norwegian–British–Swedish Antarctic Expedition (NBSAE) (1949–52) and air photos by the Norwegian expedition (1958–59). The heights are named for Gösta Hjalmar Liljequist, a Swedish meteorologist with the NBSAE.

Preikestolen Ridge is a ridge in the western part of Liljequist Heights. It was first mapped by Norwegian cartographers from surveys and air photos by the NBSAE of 1949–1952, led by John Schjelderup Giæver and air photos by the Norwegian expedition (1958–59) and named Preikestolen ("the pulpit").
