= Snøkjerringa Hill =

Snøkjerringa Hill (71°39′S 1°35′W) is a hill 3 nautical miles (5.6 km) north-northwest of Snøkallen Hill, on the east side of Ahlmann Ridge in Queen Maud Land. It was mapped by Norwegian cartographers from surveys and air photos by the Norwegian-British-Swedish Antarctic Expedition (1949–52). The name, snøkjerringa, comes from the Norwegian word for "the snow woman", with the neighboring hill, named snøkallen, meaning "the snowman".
