= SS Buskø =

Norwegian sealing vessel

History
- Name: Buskø (Note: Several references used refer to Busko as Buskoe.)
- Launched: 1926

General characteristics
- Length: 105 ft (32.0 m)
- Propulsion: Steam

Buskø was a small Norwegian sealer, seized by the U.S. Coast Guard in East Greenland in September 1941, before U.S. entry into the war, while bringing supplies and rotating personnel for Norwegian hunting stations. This caused an uproar in the American press when she was towed to Boston as a prize, frequently but incorrectly called the first American capture of an enemy surface vessel in the war. President Franklin D. Roosevelt had frequently asserted that Germany would try to gain a foothold in Greenland, and the way this was presented seems to bear him out. It was a notable early initiative in the North Atlantic weather war.

== Norwegian expedition ==
By agreement with Denmark, Norway maintained several hunting, weather, and radio stations along the East Greenland coast, Myggbukta and Torgilsbu being the most important. After the German conquest of Norway, resupply of these stations became problematic because the Royal Navy treated all ships arriving from Norway as hostile. In 1940 season, Norway managed to send two relief vessels, Veslekari and Ringsel, to Greenland. Veslekari was seized by Britain. A Danish weather expedition brought by Furenak to Cape Biot was also seized. German intelligence (Abwehr) took an interest in these expeditions (Furenak) because of a need to obtain weather reports from Greenland for U-boat and bombing missions.

In 1941, seven Norwegians remained on the coast, and Arctic-expansion proponents in Norway eager to reverse the 1933 Permanent Court of International Justice award of the area to Denmark seized on the hunters’ plight as an opportunity to outfit a new expedition. With the permission of Vidkun Quisling's government loyal to Germany, the 100-foot, 60-ton sealing vessel Buskø of Ålesund with a crew of ten was leased, and ten hunters and technicians hired. The expedition was led by Hallvard Devold, an Arctic expert who had earlier led the Norwegian occupation of East Greenland, in 1931.

Just before Buskø's departure on 29 August, German officers demanded that a Norwegian weather observer and telegraphist with German ties, Jacob Bradley, be taken aboard. This was allowed under protest. Bradley was deposited with his equipment at 7510N 2025W (Peters Bay, Ardencaple Fjord) on Hochstetter Foreland on 2 September 1941. He lodged with two other hunters in a hunting cabin and did not begin observations or radio broadcasts.

== Coast Guard seizure ==
The U.S. Coast Guard, per request of the Danish colonial government seeking a neutral sponsor, assumed responsibility for supplying the Danish settlements in Greenland now cut off from their homeland by the British. In April 1941 the Roosevelt Administration signed an agreement with the Danish minister in Washington, Henrik Kauffmann, who refused to take orders from (now German occupied) Copenhagen. It allowed full American military use of Greenland. On that authority, the icebreaker USCGC Northland patrolled Greenland in the fall of 1941. On 12 September, alerted by a Danish observer on Ella Island weather station, found and seized the Buskø and her crew of 26 men and one woman (wife and medic). The sealer was in the process of visiting several Norwegian stations. Informed about Bradley, Northwind stood into Peters Bay, found the agent, who had not yet unpacked his equipment, seized him and destroyed his radio. Buskø was then towed to Boston by USS Bear. The crew of Buskø along with the shore station personnel were sent to Boston and charged with illegal immigration rather than as prisoners of war because the United States was not at war at the time of capture.

== American reaction ==
An account of the episode appeared in the U.S. Coast Guard in WWII (pp 98–100):

“Twelve men, led by Lt. Leroy McCluskey, were assigned to attack and capture the station. About midnight the landing party proceeded in a small boat to within a mile of the station. Lt. McCluskey surrounded the shack with his commandos and, gun in hand, kicked in the door of the building and rushed in upon three men who were resting in their bunks. The German radiomen quickly surrendered and told all they knew. Their radio equipment and code were also taken. Under pretense of building a fire to make coffee for the Americans, the radiomen tried to burn some papers, but the Coast Guard party was too quick for the Nazis and the papers were seized. They turned out to be confidential instructions – Hitler’s plans for radio stations in the far north – and of considerable value to the Coast Guard.”

Much of this is contradicted in FBI-papers and Norwegian sources, but the account illustrates how Americans perceived and reacted to the incident. Thus, the official history of the U.S. Navy in World War II states: “The capture of the BUSKOE expedition by Commander Smith marks the first blow struck by the United States Navy against Germany, and as such was the first violation of the United States Neutrality policy.”

The arrival of Buskø with 21 Norwegian captives on 14 October was extensively covered in the American press. On 12 October, the New York Times held that a Nazi spy ship with a “Gestapo agent” had been caught in the Western Hemisphere, and reported rumors about extensive German activities in the island. The paper wrote: “The seized vessel, so sea-worn that little of her paint remained, was ketch rigged and equipped with an auxiliary steam engine. Norwegian colors flew at her masthead and were painted on her sides. She was extremely filthy, according to members of the prize crew. Piled on the deckhouse were skis and dog sleds, and a husky and a huge black Newfoundland dog wandered about the decks.”

== Resolution ==
Buskø′s crew, initially held for lacking “proper traveling documents,” was set free, except for Bradley who was detained until the end of the war. With the German declaration of war on the United States two months later, the affair disappeared from public memory except as a footnote.

Buskø eventually returned to Norway. She remained in service after the Second World War but sank with the loss of 20 men in 1952.

The episode came on the heels of an engagement involving the destroyer USS Greer (DD-145), revealed by President Roosevelt to the nation on the same day Buskø was seized, and thus played a role in the formation of American opinion in the last months of neutrality.

== Notes ==
=== References used ===
- New York Times: 12 October 1941: Party of 20 is Held and First Reported Direct Action; 13 October 1941: Nazi Radio Seizure Pleases Capital; Germans in Greenland; Intensified Hunt is Expected; Inquiry on Norse Crew; 15 October 1941: Enemy Planes, Boats, seen off Baffin Island; Immigration Inquiry Rushed; Brings Seized Ship from Greenland; 16 October 1941: 21 Norwegians held in seized ship case; 20 November 1941: 20 Norwegians Freed
- U.S. Naval Administration in World War II, C-in-C, U.S. Atlantic Fleet, Commander, Task Force 24, CXXXIX. Section of official series of U.S. Navy in World War II.
- Apollonio, Spencer (2008). Lands That Hold One Spellbound: A Story of East Greenland. University of Calgary Press. ISBN 978-1-55238-240-0.
- Johnson, Robert Irwin (1987). Guardians of the Sea, History of the United States Coast Guard, 1915 to the Present. Naval Institute Press, Annapolis, Maryland. ISBN 978-0-87021-720-3.
- Lauridsen, John T. Over Stregen under Besaettelsen (Dan.). Gyldendal, Copenhagen 2007 (discusses Furenak).
- Mikkelsen, Peter Schmidt Northeast Greenland, 1908-60 (Dan.). Danish Polar Center, Copenhagen 1994.
- Skarstein, Frode. Buskø-affæren. Historie/1, 2007 (Norw.), and Polar Record/2007/26/1, 1–14. (linked to English version "A cursed affair”—how a Norwegian expedition to Greenland became the USA's first maritime capture in World War II" in Polar Research)
- Walling, Michael G. (2004). Bloodstained Sea: the U.S. Coast Guard in the Battle of the Atlantic, 1941–1944. International Marine/McGraw-Hill, Camden, Maine. ISBN 978-0-07-142401-1.
- Willoughby, Malcolm (1989). U.S. Coast Guard in World War II (2 ed.). Naval Institute Press, Annapolis, Maryland. ISBN 978-0-87021-774-6.
