= Flårjuvnutane Peaks =

Mountains in Antarctica

The Flårjuvnutane Peaks (72°1′S 3°32′W) are a group of small rock peaks about 1 nautical mile (2 km) west of Flårjuven Bluff, on the Ahlmann Ridge in Queen Maud Land, Antarctica. They were mapped by Norwegian cartographers from surveys and air photos by the Norwegian–British–Swedish Antarctic Expedition (1949–52) and named Flårjuvnutane.
