= Styrbordsknattane Peaks =

Mountains in Queen Maud Land, Antarctica

Styrbordsknattane Peaks (72°13′S 3°26′W) is a cluster of small peaks just north of Kjolrabbane Hills, near the southwest end of Ahlmann Ridge in Queen Maud Land. Mapped by Norwegian cartographers from surveys and air photos by Norwegian-British-Swedish Antarctic Expedition (NBSAE) (1949–52) and named Styrbordsknattane (the starboard peaks).
