= Istind Peak =

Peak in Queen Maud Land, Antarctica

Istind Peak (72°6′S 2°23′W) is a partly ice-covered peak 1.5 km (1 mi) south of Tindeklypa, on the east side of Ahlmann Ridge in Queen Maud Land, Antarctica. It was photographed from the air by the Third German Antarctic Expedition (1938–39). It was mapped by Norwegian cartographers from air photos by the Norwegian–British–Swedish Antarctic Expedition (1949–1952), led by John Schjelderup Giæver, and from air photos by the Norwegian expedition (1958–59) and named "Istind" (ice peak).

An unsuccessful attempt to climb the mountain was made by Duncan Cromarty and Karel Koster in November 1999. Both climbers were members of the SANAE 38 overwintering team.
