= Hochstetter Bay =

Bay in Greenland

- Hochstetterbugten
- Location in Greenland
- Location: Arctic
- Coordinates: 74°53′N 18°45′W
- Ocean/sea sources: Greenland Sea
- Basin countries: Greenland

Hochstetter Bay (Danish: Hochstetterbugten) is a broad bay in northeastern Greenland. It is part of the Northeast Greenland National Park area.

The name is said to have been in use from 1929 by Danish hunters, and first appeared on the maps of the 1932 Gefion Expedition.

== Geography ==
This bay is located between Hochstetter Foreland and Shannon Island to the north, Kuhn Island to the west, and Wollaston Foreland and the Pendulum Islands to the south. To the east, the bay opens to the Greenland Sea. Ardencaple Fjord and Grandjean Fjord have their mouths in the northwestern area of the bay, and Lindeman Fjord and Albrecht Bay in the southwestern.

Map of Northeastern Greenland
