= Kullen Knoll =

Kullen Knoll (72°4′S 2°44′W) is a knoll 2 nautical miles (4 km) north of the Gösta Peaks, in the south part of Ahlmann Ridge in Queen Maud Land, Antarctica. It was mapped and named by Norwegian cartographers from surveys and air photos by the Norwegian–British–Swedish Antarctic Expedition (1949–52) and air photos by the Norwegian expedition (1958–59).
