= Klumpane Peaks =

Group of rock peaks in Queen Maud Land, Antarctica

Coordinates: 71°57′S 3°24′W

The Klumpane Peaks are a group of small rock peaks on the east side of the mouth of Strengen Valley, on the Ahlmann Ridge in Queen Maud Land, Antarctica. They were mapped by Norwegian cartographers from surveys and air photos by the Norwegian–British–Swedish Antarctic Expedition (1949–52) and named Klumpane (the lumps).
