= Vesletind Peak =

Mountain in Queen Maud Land, Antarctica

Vesletind Peak (72°10′S 3°2′W) is a small peak 3 nautical miles (6 km) east-southeast of Aurho Peak on the Ahlmann Ridge in Queen Maud Land. It was mapped by Norwegian cartographers from surveys and air photos by Norwegian-British-Swedish Antarctic Expedition (NBSAE) (1949–52) and named Vesletind, meaning "little peak."
