= Veslekletten Peak =

Mountain in Queen Maud Land, Antarctica

Veslekletten Peak (72°5′S 3°26′W) is a small mountain about 1 nautical mile (1.9 km) south of Storkletten Peak on the Ahlmann Ridge in Queen Maud Land. It was mapped by Norwegian cartographers from surveys and air photos by the Norwegian-British-Swedish Antarctic Expedition (NBSAE) (1949–52) and named Veslekletten, meaning "the little mountain."
