= Gösta Peaks =

Mountains in Antarctica

The Gösta Peaks (72°6′S 2°44′W) are the northeastern peaks of the Liljequist Heights, in the southern part of Ahlmann Ridge in Queen Maud Land, Antarctica. They were mapped by Norwegian cartographers from surveys and air photos by the Norwegian–British–Swedish Antarctic Expedition (NBSAE) (1949–52) and from air photos by the Norwegian expedition (1958–59), and were named for Gösta Hjalmar Liljequist, a Swedish meteorologist with the NBSAE.
