= Myggbukta =

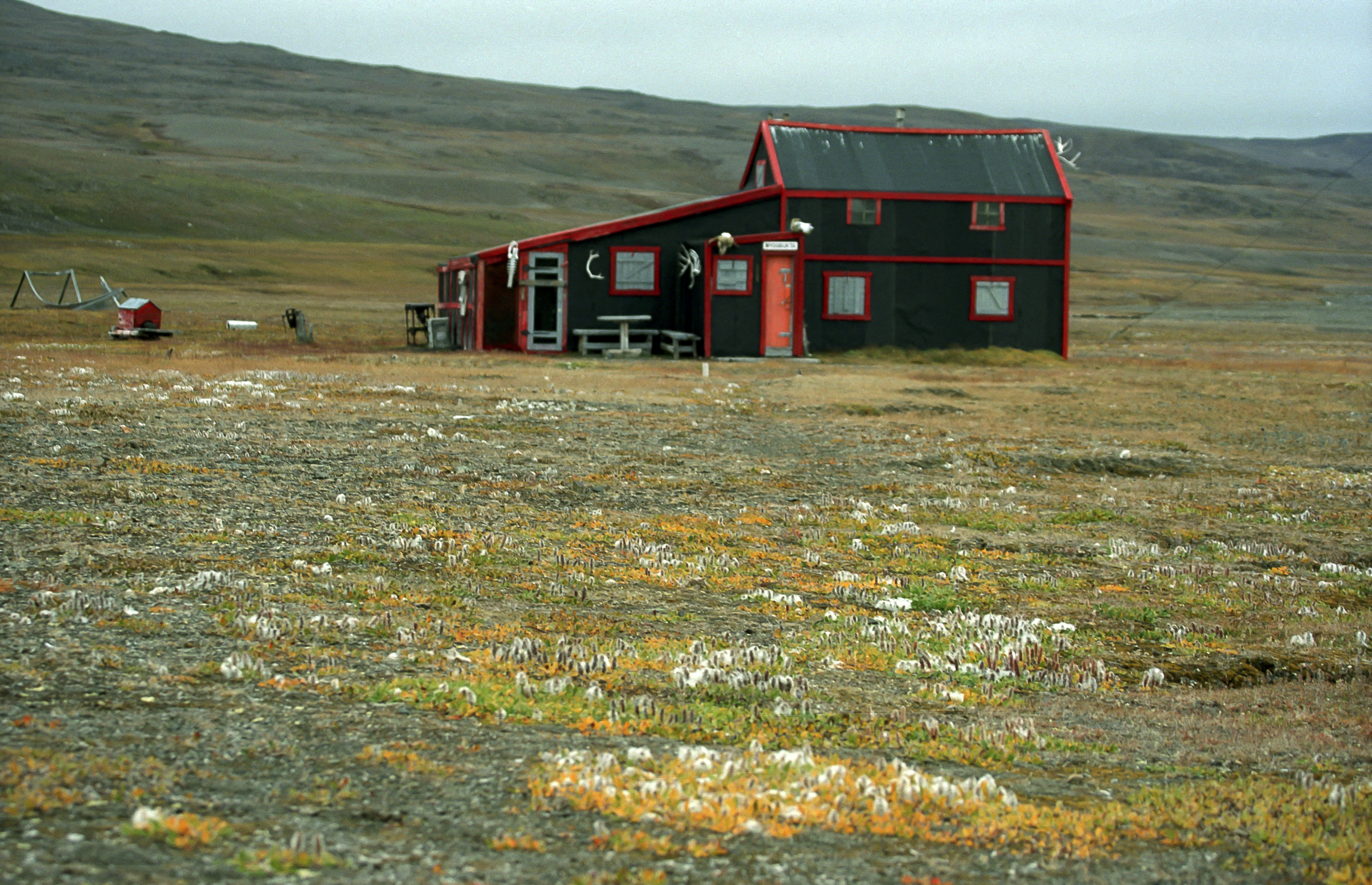
- Hut at Myggbukta

- Location within Greenland
- Coordinates: 73°29′28″N 21°32′26″W
- State: Denmark
- Constituent country: Greenland
- Zone: NE Greenland National Park
- Built /abandoned: 1932 - 1959

Population (2019)
  - Total: 0
- Time zone: UTC-01

Map of Greenland showing location of Myggbukta within Eirik Raudes Land (occupied by Norway 1931-1933)

Myggbukta (lit. 'Mosquito Bay') was a Norwegian whaling, meteorological and radio station (Myggbukta Radio/LMG) located on the coast of Eastern Greenland in present-day King Christian X Land.

The site is located at the head of Mackenzie Bay, in the area of the isthmus of Hold with Hope. Administratively it belongs to the Northeast Greenland National Park.

== History ==
The station was established by Johan A. Olsen in 1922, who named the place appropriately, for it is located in one of the worst mosquito-infested areas of Eastern Greenland (Norwegian: mygg). However, on the way back to Norway in 1923, the Norwegian sealer ANNI 1 which had brought the expedition to Greenland in 1922 was crushed in the offshore pack ice and all men on board perished. Thus the station was discontinued after only one year of operation.

In 1924 Myggbukta station was repaired by Gunnar Isachsen and it was manned by the Foldvik expedition in 1926. In 1930 was completely rebuilt and operation was continuous, sending daily weather reports from the site. On 27 June 1931 five Norwegian hunters with Hallvard Devold annexed Erik the Red's Land to Norway from the station, proclaiming:

"In the presence of Eiliv Herdal, Tor Halle, Ingvald Strøm and Søren Richter, the Norwegian flag is now hoisted in Mosquito Bay. And the land between Carlsberg Fjord in the south and Bessel Fjord in the north is occupied in His Majesty King Haakon's name."

Myggbukta thus served as de facto capital of this short-lived Norwegian territory, although sysselman ("Governor") Helge Ingstad overwintered at the more southerly station Antarctic Havn.

Together with Jónsbú Station in Hochstetter Foreland, as well as Storfjord, Torgilsbu and Finnsbu further south, Myggbukta became part of the Norwegian contribution to the International Polar Year 1932–33. During World War II, in September 1940, patrol boat Fridtjof Nansen of the Free Norwegian Navy, destroyed the radio equipment, leaving Myggbukta in bad condition. The station was rebuilt in the summer of 1946, resuming operation until 1959 when Norwegian state subsidies were withheld forcing the station to close down.

Map of Northeastern Greenland

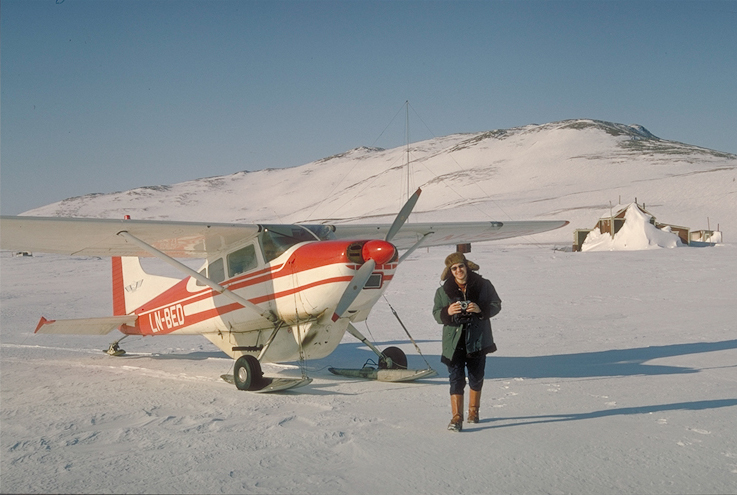
Remains of Myygbukta in 1973

== Bibliography ==
- Spencer Apollonio, Lands That Hold One Spellbound: A Story of East Greenland, 2008

== See also ==
- Antarctic Haven
- Arctic Trading Co.
