= Ove Peak =

Mountain in Queen Maud Land, Antarctica

Ove Peak (72°11′S 3°27′W) is the northernmost peak in the group at the west side of Wilson Saddle, near the southwest end of Ahlmann Ridge in Queen Maud Land. Mapped by Norwegian cartographers from surveys and air photos by Norwegian-British-Swedish Antarctic Expedition (NBSAE) (1949–52) and named for Ove Wilson, medical officer with NBSAE.
