= Lyftingen Peak =

Mountain in Queen Maud Land, Antarctica

Lyftingen Peak (72°17′S 3°15′W) is a peak just southeast of the Kjølrabbane Hills, near the southwest end of Ahlmann Ridge in Queen Maud Land, Antarctica. It was mapped and named by Norwegian cartographers from surveys and air photos by the Norwegian–British–Swedish Antarctic Expedition (1949–52).
