= Slettfjell =

Slettfjell (72°8′S 3°19′W) is a low, flattish mountain about 1 nautical mile (1.9 km) west of Aurho Peak, on the Ahlmann Ridge of Queen Maud Land. Mapped by Norwegian cartographers from surveys and air photos by Norwegian-British-Swedish Antarctic Expedition (NBSAE) (1949–52) and named Slettfjell (level mountain).
