= Trollkjelpiggen Peak =

Mountain in Queen Maud Land, Antarctica

Trollkjelpiggen Peak (71°35′S 1°9′W) is a peak 5 nautical miles (9 km) southwest of Utkikken Hill, on the east side of Ahlmann Ridge in Queen Maud Land. Mapped by Norwegian cartographers from surveys and air photos by Norwegian-British-Swedish Antarctic Expedition (NBSAE) (1949–52) and air photos by the Norwegian expedition (1958–59) and named Trollkjelpiggen (peak of the troll's cauldron).
