= Utkikken Hill =

Rock summit

Utkikken Hill (71°32′S 1°1′W) is the northeasternmost rock summit on the Ahlmann Ridge, standing 4 nautical miles (7 km) northeast of Trollkjelpiggen Peak where it overlooks the mouth of Jutulstraumen Glacier and the coastal ice shelf, in Queen Maud Land. Mapped by Norwegian cartographers from surveys and air photos by Norwegian-British-Swedish Antarctic Expedition (NBSAE) (1949–52) and air photos by the Norwegian expedition (1958–59) and named Utkikken (the look out).
