= Brautnuten Peak =

Peak in Antarctica

Brautnuten Peak (71°46′S 1°21′W) is a low peak 5 nautical miles (9 km) southeast of Snøkallen Hill, on the east side of Ahlmann Ridge in Queen Maud Land. It was mapped by Norwegian cartographers from surveys and air photos by the Norwegian–British–Swedish Antarctic Expedition (1949–52) and from air photos by the Norwegian expedition (1958–59) and named by the Norwegians.
