= Slettfjellnutane Peaks =

Mountain of Queen Maud Land

Coordinates: 72°5′S 3°18′W

Slettfjellnutane Peaks are two small rock peaks about 2 nautical miles (3.7 km) north of Slettfjell on the Ahlmann Ridge in Queen Maud Land. Mapped by Norwegian cartographers from surveys and air photos by Norwegian-British-Swedish Antarctic Expedition (NBSAE) (1949–52), and named Slettfjellnutane (the level mountain peaks) because of their proximity to Slettfjell.
