= Grandjean Fjord =

Fjord in Greenland

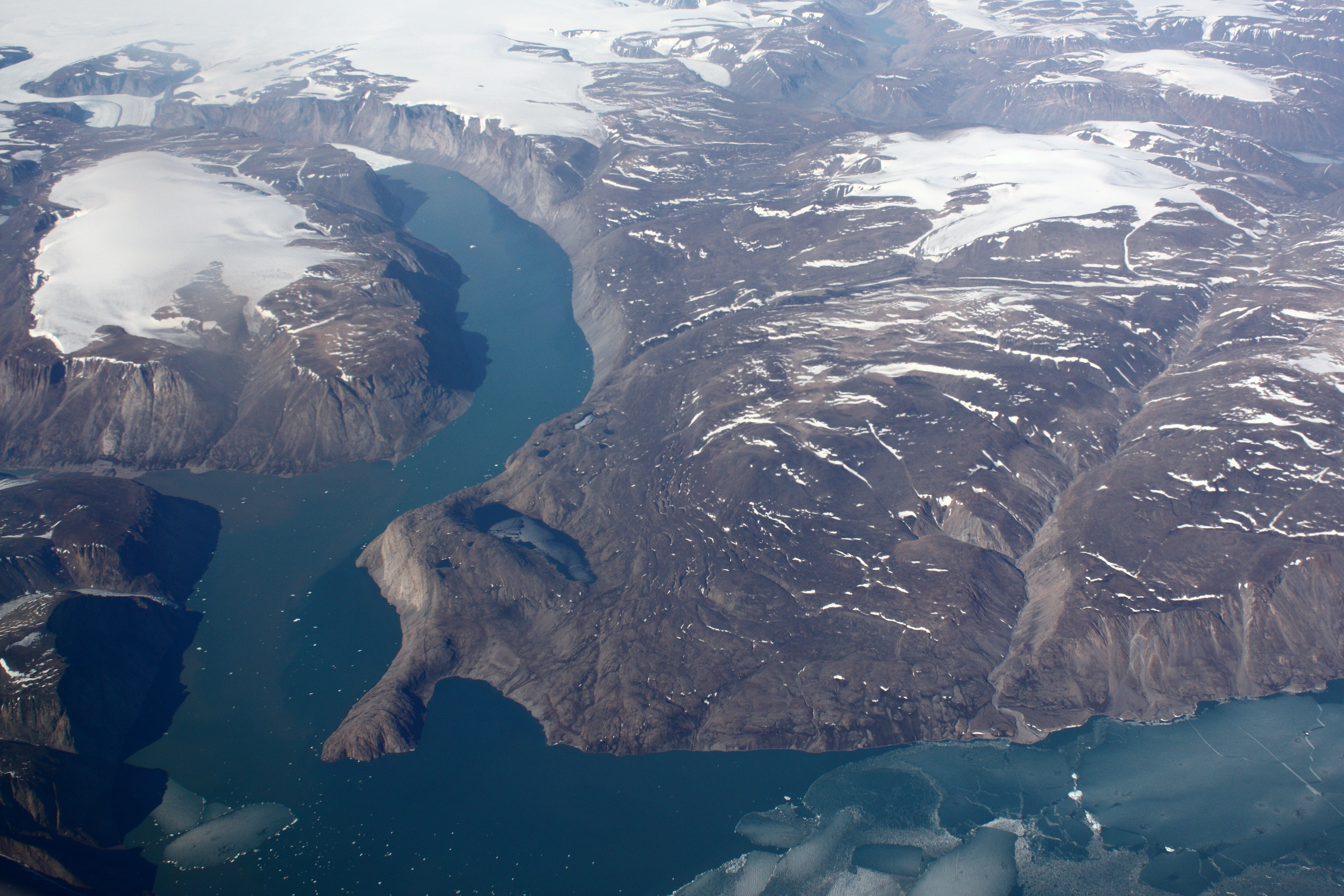
- View of the main bend of Grandjean Fjord, with Betulahavn on the left and the terminus of the Heinkel Glacier in the background.

- Location in Greenland
- Location: Arctic
- Coordinates: 75°0′N 21°30′W
- Ocean/sea sources: Hochstetter Bay; Greenland Sea
- Basin countries: Greenland
- Max. length: 75 kilometres (47 mi)
- Max. width: 5 kilometres (3.1 mi)
- Frozen: Most of the year
- Islands: Ulla Island

Grandjean Fjord is a fjord in King Christian X Land, East Greenland. Administratively it is part of the Northeast Greenland National Park zone.

== History ==
This fjord was mapped in 1932 during the Three-year Expedition to East Greenland led by Lauge Koch. In August of the same year it was surveyed by Gunnar Seidenfaden. Koch named it after Commander Emil Valdemar Asger Grandjean (1889–1948), then chief of the Royal Danish Navy Air Service

== Geography ==
Grandjean Fjord opens to the east, between Cape Negri to the south and Cape Buch to the north. Its mouth is located in the northwestern area of Hochstetter Bay, by the northern entrance of Fligely Fjord, northwest of Kuhn Island and south of the mouth area of Ardencaple Fjord. Ulla Island rises in the middle of mouth area of the fjord, about 7 kilometres (4.3 mi) from the entrance.

The fjord is about 5 kilometres (3.1 mi) wide at the mouth and stretches to the southwest for about 35 kilometres (22 mi), curving northwestwards and narrowing to about 3 kilometres (1.9 mi) in its inner half where the Heinkel Glacier flows into the head. Grandjean Fjord separates Thomas Thomsen Land in the south from C. H. Ostenfeldland to the north. There are high mountains on both sides of the fjord. Betulahavn is a bay in the SW side of the central stretch of the fjord.

Map of Northeastern Greenland

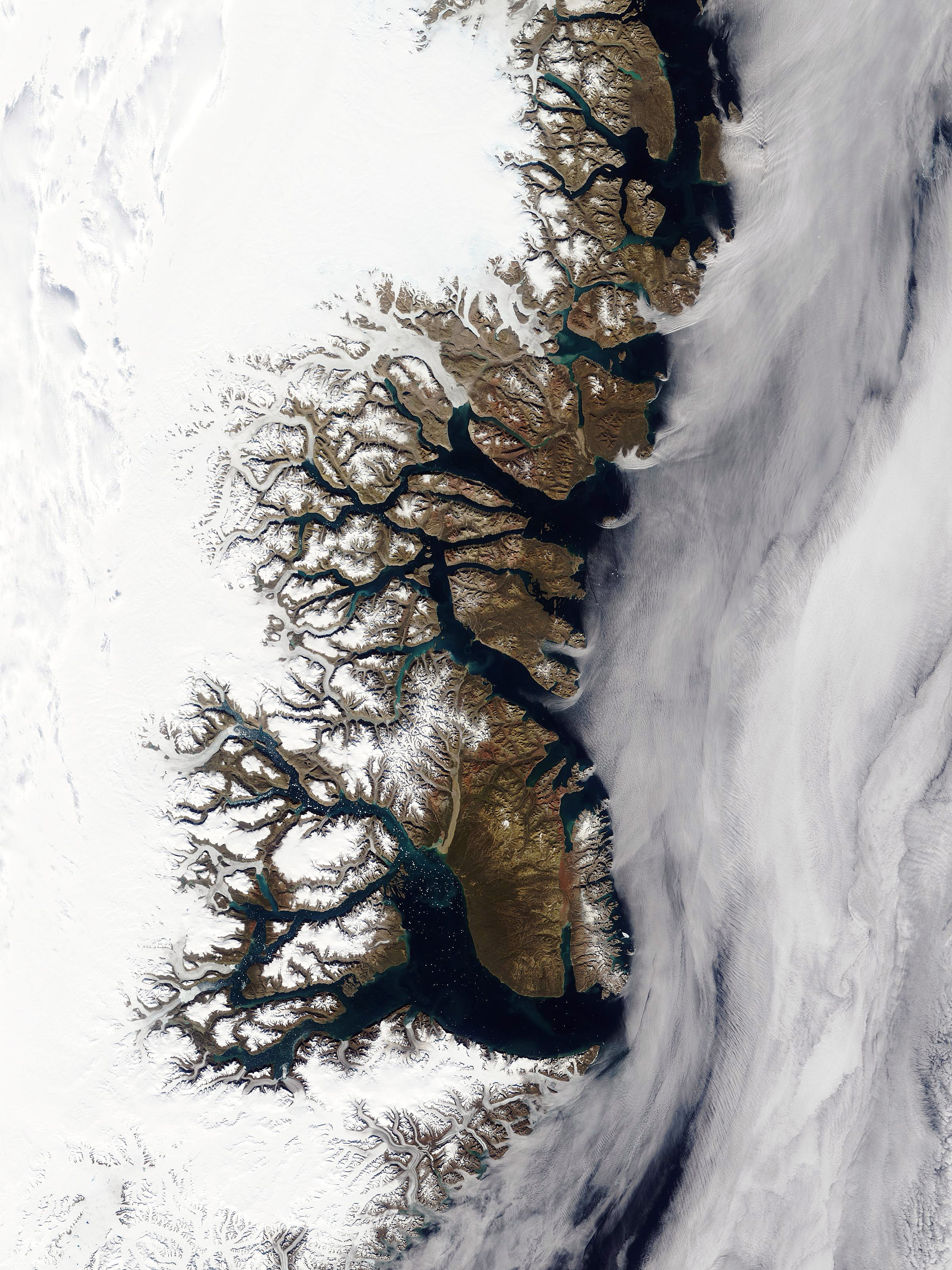
East Greenland Terra/MODIS satellite image

== Bibliography ==
- A. K. Higgins, Jane A. Gilotti, M. Paul Smith (eds.), The Greenland Caledonides: Evolution of the Northeast Margin of Laurentia.

== See also ==
- List of fjords of Greenland
