= Slettfjellklumpen Spur =

Slettfjellklumpen Spur (72°8′S 3°18′W) is a rock spur forming the north end of Slettfjell, on the Ahlmann Ridge in Queen Maud Land. Mapped by Norwegian cartographers from surveys and air photos by Norwegian-British-Swedish Antarctic Expedition (NBSAE) (1949–52), and named Slettfjellklumpen (the level mountain lump) in association with Slettfjell.
