= Kjølrabbane Hills =

Group of hills in Queen Maud Land, Antarctica

The Kjølrabbane Hills (72°16′S 3°22′W) are a small group of hills between Lyftingen Peak and the Styrbordsknattane Peaks, near the southwest end of Ahlmann Ridge in Queen Maud Land, Antarctica. They were mapped by Norwegian cartographers from surveys and air photos by the Norwegian–British–Swedish Antarctic Expedition (1949–52) and named Kjølrabbane (the keel hills).
