= Grunehogna Peaks =

- Location within Antarctica

Highest point
- Coordinates: 72°3′S 2°47′W

Geography
- Region: Queen Maud Land
- Parent range: Ahlmann Ridge

The Grunehogna Peaks are a group of peaks 2 nautical miles (4 km) north of the Liljequist Heights, in the south part of Ahlmann Ridge in Queen Maud Land, Antarctica. They were photographed from the air by the Third German Antarctic Expedition (1938–39). They were mapped by Norwegian cartographers from surveys and air photos by the Norwegian–British–Swedish Antarctic Expedition (1949–52) and the Norwegian expedition (1958–59) and named Grunehogna.

== Sarie Marais Field Base ==
Sarie Marais Field Base
- Antarctic research station
- Interactive map of Sarie Marais Field Base
- Coordinates: 72°01′35″S 2°48′18″W
- Established: 1982
- Decommissioned: 2001
- Named after: Sarie Marais

Government
  - Type: Administration
  - Body: SANAP, South Africa
- Active times: Every summer

The summer research station Sarie Marais was erected at Grunehogna for geological, geophysical, and surveying programs in the 1982/1983 summer by the South African National Antarctic Programme and decommissioned in the 2001/2002 summer season.
