= Erik the Red's Land =

Norwegian claim to an area of eastern Greenland from 1931 to 1933

Coordinates: 73.710°N 22.917°W

Erik the Red's Land Eirik Raudes Land (Norwegian) Erik Aappaluttup Nuna (Greenlandic)
- Unrecognized territory
- 1931–1933
- Flag of Norway

- Erik the Red's Land
- Capital: Myggbukta (unofficial)
- Government
- King
  - 1931–1933: Haakon VII
- Governor
  - 1932–1933: Helge Ingstad
- History
  - Norwegian proclamation: 10 July 1931
  - Territory awarded to Denmark: 5 April 1933
Preceded by	Succeeded by
North Greenland	North Greenland
- Today part of: Northeast Greenland National Park

Erik the Red's Land (Norwegian: Eirik Raudes Land) was the name given by Norwegians to an area on the coast of eastern Greenland occupied by Norway in the early 1930s. It was named after Erik the Red, the founder of the first Norse or Viking settlements in Greenland in the 10th century. The Permanent Court of International Justice ruled against Norway in the Eastern Greenland Case in 1933, and the country subsequently abandoned its claims.

The area once had an Inuit population, but the last member was seen in 1823 by Douglas Clavering on Clavering Island. By 1931, that part of Greenland was uninhabited and included only three main Norwegian stations (Jonsbu, Myggbukta and Antarctic Havn) and numerous smaller ones.

== Origin of the claim ==
The first European settlement in Greenland was established by Norse colonists from Iceland around the year 1000. There were two main Norse settlements on Greenland, but both were on the southwestern coast of the island, far away from the area that later became Erik the Red's Land. From the 1260s the Norse colony in Greenland recognized the King of Norway as its overlord. When Norway was a part of Denmark-Norway, from 1537 until 1814, official documents made it clear that Greenland was part of Norway. However, contact with the settlements there was lost in the Late Middle Ages and the Norse population died out, possibly around 1500.

Centuries later a Dano-Norwegian evangelist, Hans Egede, heard about the Norse colony on Greenland. He then asked King Frederick IV of Denmark-Norway for permission to try to find the long-lost colony and eventually to establish a Protestant Christian mission there to convert the population of the land, who were presumed, if any survived, to still be Catholic or to have completely lost the Christian faith. Egede reached Greenland in 1721, and finding no Norse population there, started his mission among the Inuit. This led to his becoming known as the "Apostle of Greenland" and he was appointed Bishop of Greenland. He founded the current capital of Greenland, Nuuk (formerly Godthaab). In 1723, the Bergen Greenland Company (Det Bergenske Grønlandskompani) received a concession for all trade with Greenland.

For the remainder of the union between Norway and Denmark, the relationship between Greenland and the state was organised in different ways. Modern historians disagree as to what point in history Greenland went from being a Norwegian possession to being a Danish one. However, the Treaty of Kiel, signed in 1814, indicates that Greenland was at least politically regarded as having been Norwegian: "...the Kingdom of Norway ... as well as the dependencies (Greenland, the Faroes and Iceland not included) ... shall for the future belong to ... His Majesty the King of Sweden ...". Norway never recognised the validity of the Treaty of Kiel.

== History ==
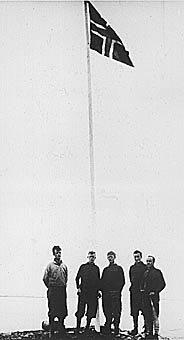
Raising of the Norwegian flag at Myggbukta, Eirik Raudes Land.

In 1919, Denmark claimed the whole of Greenland as its territory, with Norway's acquiescence (see Ihlen Declaration). However, in 1921, Denmark proposed to exclude all foreigners from Greenland, creating diplomatic conflict until July 1924, when Denmark agreed that Norwegians could establish hunting and scientific settlements north of 60°27' N.

In June 1931, Hallvard Devold, one of the founders of the Norwegian Arctic Trading Co., raised the Norwegian flag at Myggbukta and on 10 July 1931, a Norwegian royal proclamation was issued, claiming Eastern Greenland as Norwegian territory. Norway claimed that the area was terra nullius: it had no permanent inhabitants and was for the most part used by Norwegian trappers and fishermen. The area was defined as "situated between Carlsberg Fjord in the South and Bessel Fjord in the North", extending from latitude 71°30' to latitude 75°40'N. Although it was not explicitly stated in the proclamation itself, it was assumed that the area was limited to the eastern coast, so that the Inland Ice constituted its western limit. (The Inland Ice covers five sixths of Greenland's total area, so that only a narrow strip of varying width along the coast is free of permanent ice.)

Additionally, Iceland attempted to stake their own claim over the island, and tried to gain international recognition over their claim with little success.

Norway and Denmark agreed to settle their dispute over Eastern Greenland in what became known as the "Greenland case" (Grønlandssaken/Grønlandssagen) at the Permanent Court of International Justice in 1933. Norway lost and after the ruling it abandoned its claim.

During the 1940–1945 German occupation of Norway in World War II, the territorial claim was briefly revived by the puppet Quisling regime, which extended it to cover all of Greenland, which had been occupied by United States. A small-scale invasion to "reconquer" the island for Norway was proposed by Vidkun Quisling, but the Germans rejected this after deeming it not feasible in light of the then ongoing Battle of the Atlantic. One ship, SS Buskø, went there in the summer 1941 to establish a weather station, but was seized by the United States.

== See also ==
- Antarctic Haven
- Cartographic expeditions to Greenland
- King Christian X Land
- Finnsbu and Torgilsbu, part of a simultaneous claim in Southeast Greenland, which was called Fridtjof Nansen Land
