= Sabine Island =

Island in Greenland

Native name: Sabine Ø
- Location within Greenland

Geography
- Location: Greenland Sea, Eastern Greenland
- Coordinates: 74°36′N 18°59′W
- Archipelago: Pendulum Islands
- Total islands: 3
- Major islands: Sabine, Little Pendulum Island
- Area: 155.9 km^{2} (60.2 sq mi)
- Highest elevation: 699 m (2293 ft)
- Highest point: Keferstein

Administration
- Greenland

Demographics
- Population: 0

Sabine Island (/ˈseɪbɪn/ SAY-bin; Danish: Sabine Ø) is an island to the northeast of Wollaston Foreland, previously known as Inner Pendulum Island. It is in the Northeast Greenland National Park area.

== Geography ==
Sabine Island is 16 km (9.9 mi) long from Kap Neumayer in the north to Teddy Udkig in the south, and 14 km (8.7 mi) wide. The area measures 155.9 km^{2} (60.2 sq mi), and the shoreline 59.8 km (37.2 mi). The highest elevation is the 699 m (2,293 ft) high Keferstein. Other important peaks are Kronebjerg, Tafelbjerg and Søspidsen.

Together with an islet named Walrus Island (Danish: Hvalros Ø) off its southern point, and Little Pendulum Island located to the east, it constitutes the Pendulum Islands group. Numerous huts used by Inuit remain on the island.

There is also a small Sabine Island in Melville Bay, Northwest Greenland, as Mr. Sabine was also on the 1818 Ross expedition to these parts. That exposed islet was the site of a U.S. LORAN station in the post-war era.

== History ==
The North East Greenland coast was colonized by Palaeo- and Neo-Eskimo groups in the past. The Inuit and their ancestors colonized and abandoned the area at least four times during the last four thousand years. There are remains of Inuit dwellings in Sabine Island that were first reported by Carl Koldewey during the Second German North Polar Expedition 1869–70.

Sabine Island was named Sabine Insel by Koldewey's expedition after the geophysicist General Sir Edward Sabine, who carried out pendulum gravimetric experiments on the island in 1823. Sabine had been aboard the Clavering 1823 Arctic expedition, the only one to encounter living Inuit in Northeast Greenland.

The Second German North Polar Expedition built a house at Germaniahafen on the south side. This station was later used by hunting expeditions.

From August 1942 to June 1943, the German meteorological expedition Unternehmen Holzauge under the command of Captain Hermann Ritter, with headquarters in Hansa Bay on the eastern side of the island, operated successfully on Sabine. It was discovered in March by the North-East Greenland Sledge Patrol, established by Greenland governor Eske Brun. In May, the station was bombed by U.S. aircraft from Iceland led by Colonel Bernt Balchen. In June, the surviving members of the German team were evacuated to Norway by air from a Dornier Do 18 seaplane launched from ship Schwabenland.

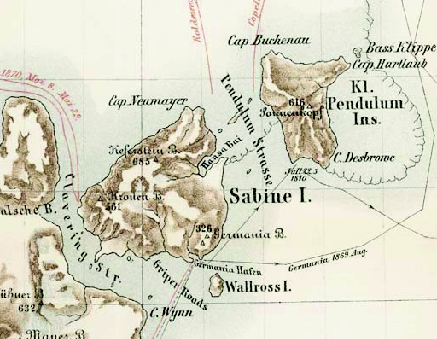
19th century map of the Pendulum Islands. 2nd German Polar Expedition 1869–70.

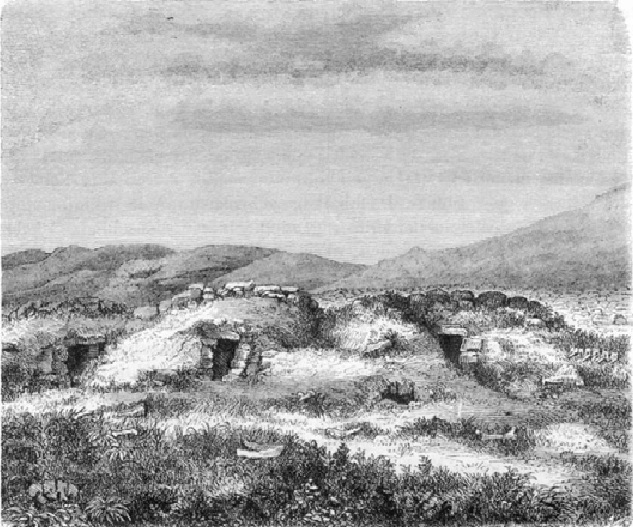
Inuit dwellings found by Carl Koldewey in 1869.

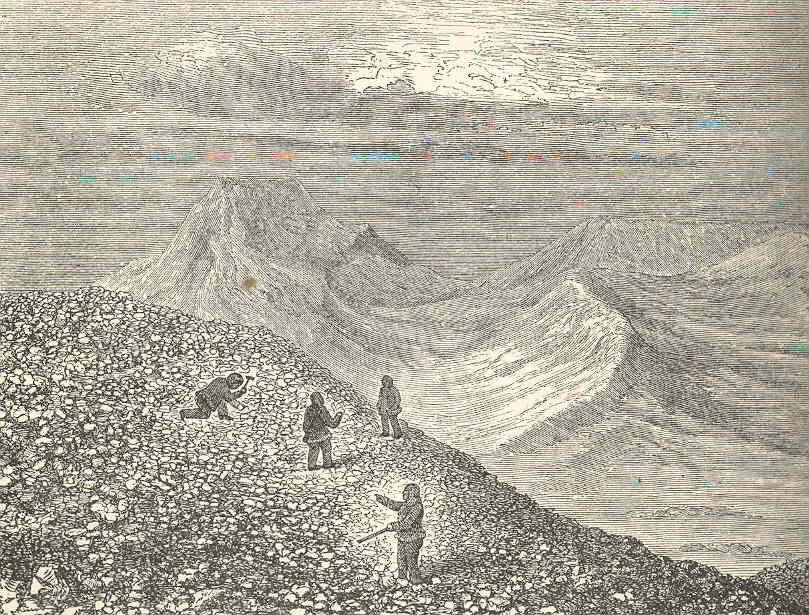
The Kronebjerg (German: Kronenberg), an unusually-shaped 487 m (1,598 ft) high mountain located on the western side of the island.

== See also ==
- List of islands of Greenland

== Bibliography ==
- Koldewey, Carl (1874) German Arctic Expedition of 1869-70, and Narrative of the Wreck of the 'Hansa' in the Ice, London: Sampson Low, Marston, Low, & Searle
