= Queen Margrethe II Land =

Peninsula in northeastern Greenland

Native name: Dronning Margrethe II Nuna (Greenlandic) Dronning Margrethe II Land (Danish)
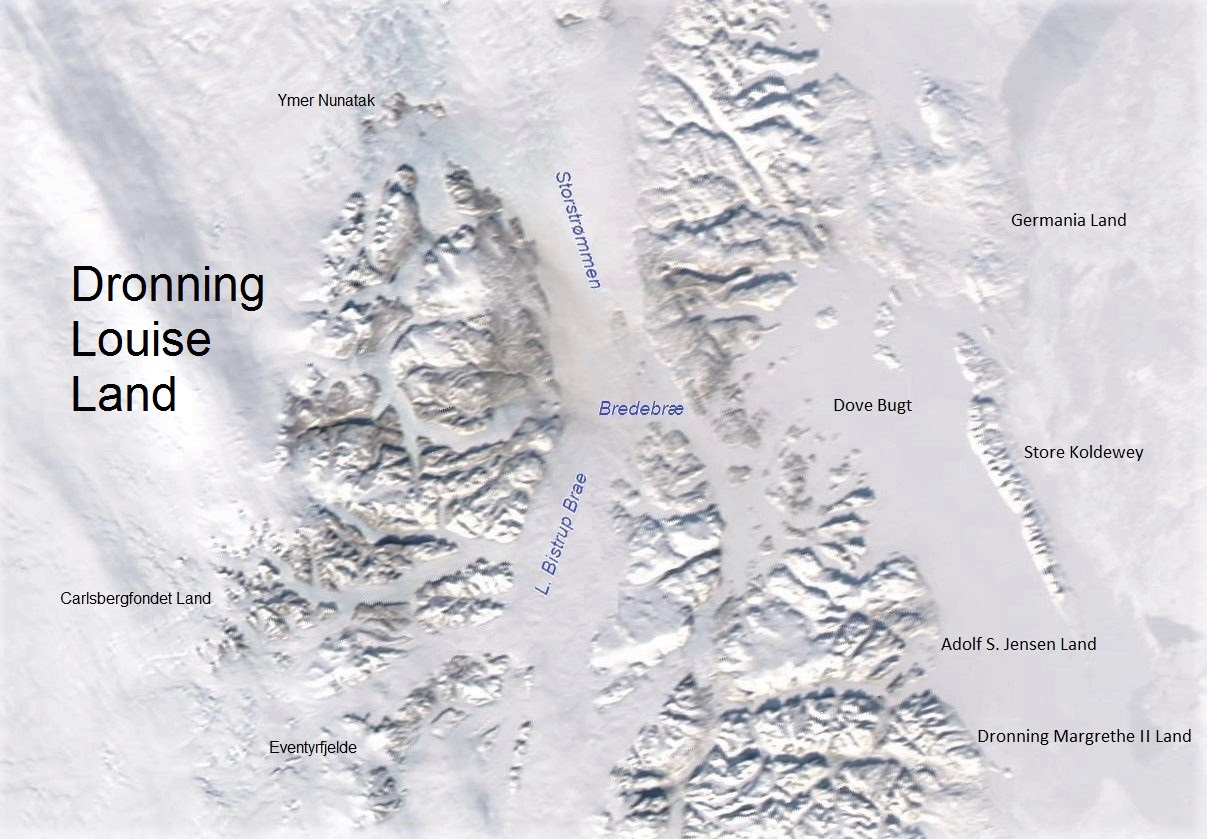
- Queen Margrethe II Land in the southeast

- Location within Greenland

Geography
- Location: East Greenland
- Coordinates: 75°40′N 21°0′W
- Adjacent to: Bessel Fjord; Greenland Sea; Shannon Sound; Ardencaple Fjord; Bredefjord
- Length: 112 km (69.6 mi)
- Width: 65 km (40.4 mi)
- Highest elevation: 1,756 m (5761 ft)

Administration
- Greenland (Kingdom of Denmark)
- Administrative division: Northeast Greenland National Park

Demographics
- Population: Uninhabited

Ramsar Wetland
- Official name: Hochstetter Forland
- Designated: 27 January 1988
- Reference no.: 390

Queen Margrethe II Land (Greenlandic: Dronning Margrethe II Nuna; Danish: Dronning Margrethe II Land) is a peninsula in the northern limit of King Christian X Land, northeastern Greenland. Administratively it belongs to the NE Greenland National Park area.

== History ==
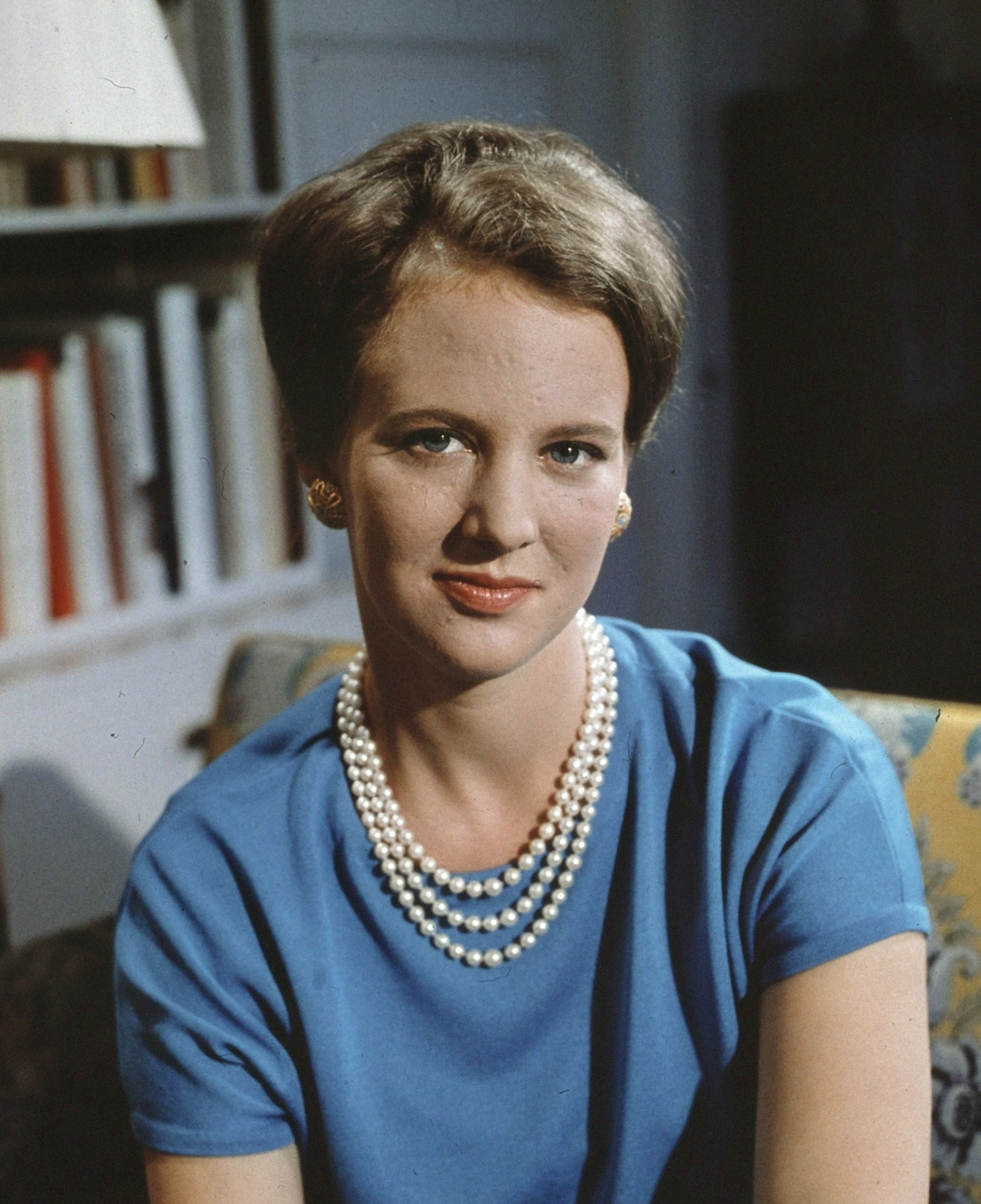
Margrethe II (r. 1972–2024)

The peninsula was named after Queen Margrethe II of Denmark on 16 April 1990 on the occasion of her 50th birthday.

In 1932 a Norwegian hunting station was built at the southern end of Hochstetter Foreland, on the western shore of Peters Bay, by the mouth of Ardencaple Fjord. It was named Jonsbu (Jónsbú) after Norwegian trapper John Schjelderup Giæver (1901–1970). The station was destroyed in World War II.

== Geography ==
Queen Margrethe II Land is bounded in the west by the Ejnar Mikkelsen Glacier, in the north by the Bessel Fjord, in the east by the Greenland Sea, in the southeast by the Shannon Sound —with Shannon Island across it to the east, and in the south by the Ardencaple Fjord and the Bredefjord. Adolf S. Jensen Land lies to the north of the Bessel Fjord. Haystack is the peninsula's easternmost point.

The peninsula has two distinct parts:

- Nørlund Land (Nørlund Land), the northern section, all mountainous. The name was given by Lauge Koch following aerial observations during the 1931 - 1934 Three-year Expedition to East Greenland in honour of N.E. Nørlund (1885–1980), the director of the Danish Geodesic Institute at that time. In the same manner as with the Norlund Alps further south, Norlund requested that the name should not be printed on official maps until after his death.
- Hochstetter Foreland (Hochstetter Forland) is the flat part jutting to the south and southeast. The wetlands of Hochstetter Foreland are mostly tundra dotted with small lakes. Since it is an important place for staging geese in their long journeys —such as the Pink-footed goose (Anser brachyrhynchus), as well as for different species of waterbirds, the area was declared a Ramsar site in 1988.

=== Mountains ===
The highest elevation of Queen Margrethe II Land is a 1,756 m (5,761 ft) high unnamed mountain in the southern part of Norlund Land. The main mountains in the peninsula are Møbius Bjerg and Schneekoppe in the north and the Barth Range, Matterhorn and Wildspitze in the southern area.

Map of Northeastern Greenland.

== See also ==
- Erik the Red's Land
- SS Buskø
