= Snøhetta Dome =

Mountain in Antarctica

Snøhetta Dome (72°11′S 2°48′W) is a dome-shaped elevation which is snow-covered except for a few rock exposures, situated 3 nautical miles (5.6 km) east of Hornet Peak in the Ahlmann Ridge of Queen Maud Land. It was mapped by Norwegian cartographers from surveys and air photos by the Norwegian-British-Swedish Antarctic Expedition (1949–52) and air photos by the Norwegian expedition of 1958–59, and named Snøhetta ("the snow cap").
