= Jonsbu =

Jónsbú Norsk Petersbugt Station
- Map of Greenland showing location of Jónsbú Station within Erik the Red's Land.

- Location within Greenland
- Coordinates: 75°19′23″N 20°22′24″W
- State: Denmark
- Constituent country: Greenland
- Zone: NE Greenland National Park
- Built: 1932

Population (2019)
  - Total: 0
- Time zone: UTC-01

Jonsbu was a Norwegian hunting and radio station (Jonsbu Radio/LMW) located on the coast of Eastern Greenland in present-day King Christian X Land.

Administratively the area where the hut stood belongs now to the Northeast Greenland National Park.

The site is located in southern Hochstetter Foreland on the western side of Peters Bay, northeast of the mouth of Ardencaple Fjord, about 15 km (9.3 mi) from Cape Klinkerfues.

== History ==
The station was built in 1932 by John Giæver's expedition, about 15 km (9.3 mi) northeast of the mouth of Ardencaple Fjord. It was named "Jónsbú" after Norwegian journalist John Schjelderup Giæver (1901–1970), who lived as a hunter and trapper in East Greenland from 1929 to 1934. The station had also been known as "Norsk Petersbugt Station".

Together with Myggbukta, as well as Storfjord, Torgilsbu and Finnsbu further south, Jonsbu became part of the Norwegian contribution to the International Polar Year 1932–33.

The original station was burnt down in August 1943 during World War II in an attack by Greenland Patrol ship USCGC Northland. The ship destroyed the station in order to prevent its facilities from being used by the military of the Third Reich.

In 1948, well after the end of the war, the new Jónsbú Station was built in a new location south of Peters Bay, on the other side of Ardencaple Fjord by the mouth of Kildedal at 75°14.8′N 20°52.6′W. In order to differentiate the two huts, the ruin of the old station is also known as "Gamle Jonsbu" (Old Jonsbu) —although the name "Jónsbú Station" is still officially applied to it— and the new one as "Ny Jonsbu".

== Bibliography ==
- Spencer Apollonio, Lands That Hold One Spellbound: A Story of East Greenland, 2008
- Frode Skarstein, “A cursed affair”—how a Norwegian expedition to Greenland became the USA’s first maritime capture in World War II. Norwegian Polar Institute,

== See also ==
- Antarctic Haven
- Cape Biot
- Myggbukta
