= Arctic Trading Co. =

Norwegian hunting and trading company

Arctic Trading Co. (Norwegian: Arktisk Næringsdrift) was a Norwegian company founded on 24 June 1929.

The company had commercial interests in East Greenland in the areas of fishing, hunting and trapping. It also operated the Myggbukta radio and meteorological station on behalf of the Norwegian state.

The company was founded in Norway by a group of people with interests in the polar regions, including trapper Hallvard Devold who was CEO in the first years, and the head of the Norwegian Svalbard and Arctic Ocean Survey (NSIU), Adolf Hoel. Hoel was the chairman of the company until 1945. Since its foundation Arctic Trading Co. was run through the NSIU, which from 1948 became the Norwegian Polar Institute.

The company helped to create a network of Norwegian hunting stations in East Greenland in the second half of the 1920s. Arctic Trading Co. provided free travel and equipment to the hunters and trappers manning the cabins, but they had to bring their own weapons and supplies. The company retained 40% of the gross value of the furs and 25% of the arctic char and salmon catch, leaving the rest to the trapper. Furs were mainly from the Arctic fox, white fox fur and blue fox fur.

Norwegian operations in East Greenland were concluded in 1959, but the company was not closed pending other possible business opportunities in the area. Finally, at the request of the Ministry of Trade and Industry, which was one of the shareholders, an extraordinary general meeting was called on 26 May 1981 to wrap up the company.

The company's archives are kept at the State Archives in Tromsø.

== See also ==
- Erik the Red's Land
