= Lindeman Fjord =

Fjord in Greenland

- Lindeman Bugt
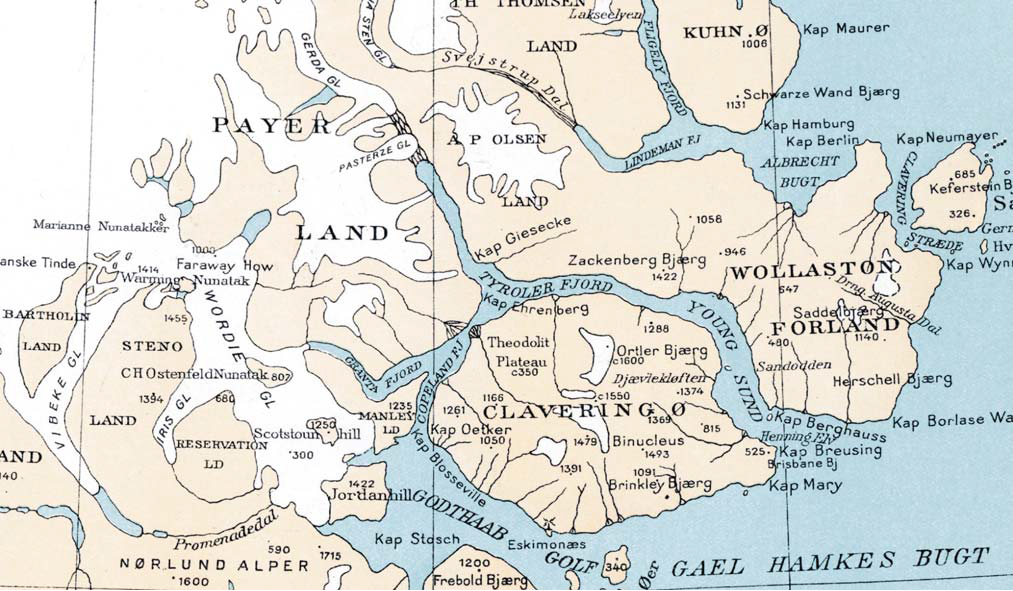
- Map section showing the Lindeman Fjord area.

- Location in Greenland
- Location: Arctic
- Coordinates: 74°40′N 20°45.4′W
- Ocean/sea sources: Hochstetter Bay; Greenland Sea
- Basin countries: Greenland
- Max. length: 25 kilometres (16 mi)
- Max. width: 5 kilometres (3.1 mi)
- Frozen: Most of the year

Lindeman Fjord is a fjord in King Christian X Land, East Greenland. Administratively it is part of the Northeast Greenland National Park zone.

== History ==
The outer part of the fjord was first surveyed by Carl Koldewey during the 1869–70 Second German North Polar Expedition. Koldewey named it Lindeman Bai after Moritz Karl Adolf Lindeman (1823 – 1908), secretary of the Association for German Polar Exploration (Verein für die Deutsche Nordpolarfahrt) in Bremen.

Later, during the 1929–1930 Expedition to East Greenland led by Lauge Koch, more thorough surveys were made and the fjord was found to become narrow to the west and extend further inland, thus the water body was renamed "Lindeman Fjord".

== Geography ==
Lindeman Fjord opens to the east, southwest of Kuhn Island and south of the mouth area of Fligely Fjord. It extends southwest of Kuhn Island, west of Cape Schumacher at the southern end of the island. To the south lies A. P. Olsen Land and Thomas Thomsen Land lies to the north.

The fjord is about 5 kilometres (3.1 mi) wide at the entrance and stretches to the west for about 25 kilometres (16 mi), curving slightly southwestwards and narrowing to less than 2.5 kilometres (1.6 mi) before the head. A massive mountain named Hohe Kugel rises north of the mouth of the fjord. Svejstrup Dal, a long valley at the head of Lindemann Fjord, stretches northwestwards between A. P. Olsen Land and Thomas Thomsen Land

Map of Northeastern Greenland

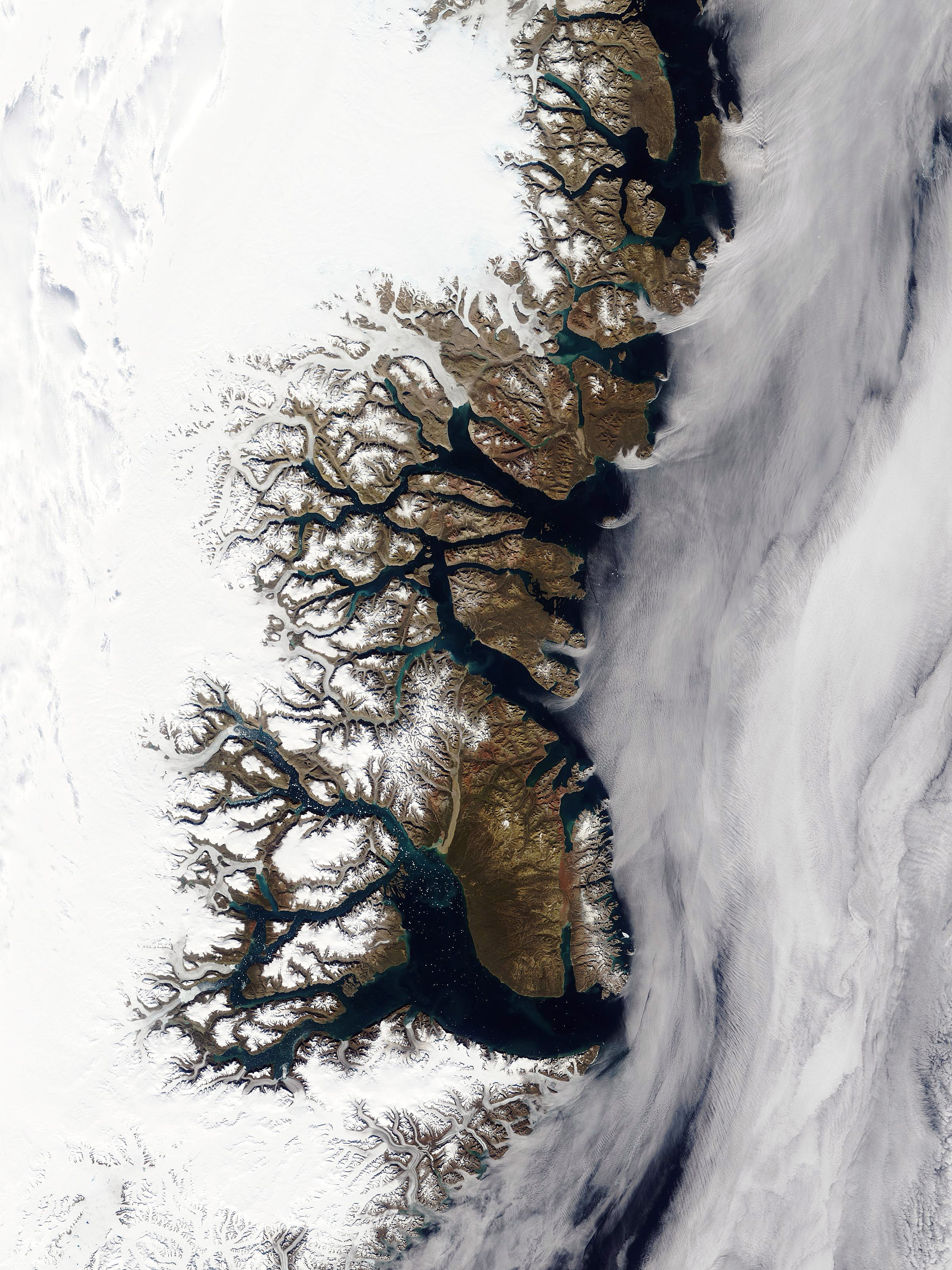
East Greenland Terra/MODIS satellite image

== See also ==
- List of fjords of Greenland
