= Adolf S. Jensen Land =

Peninsula in Greenland

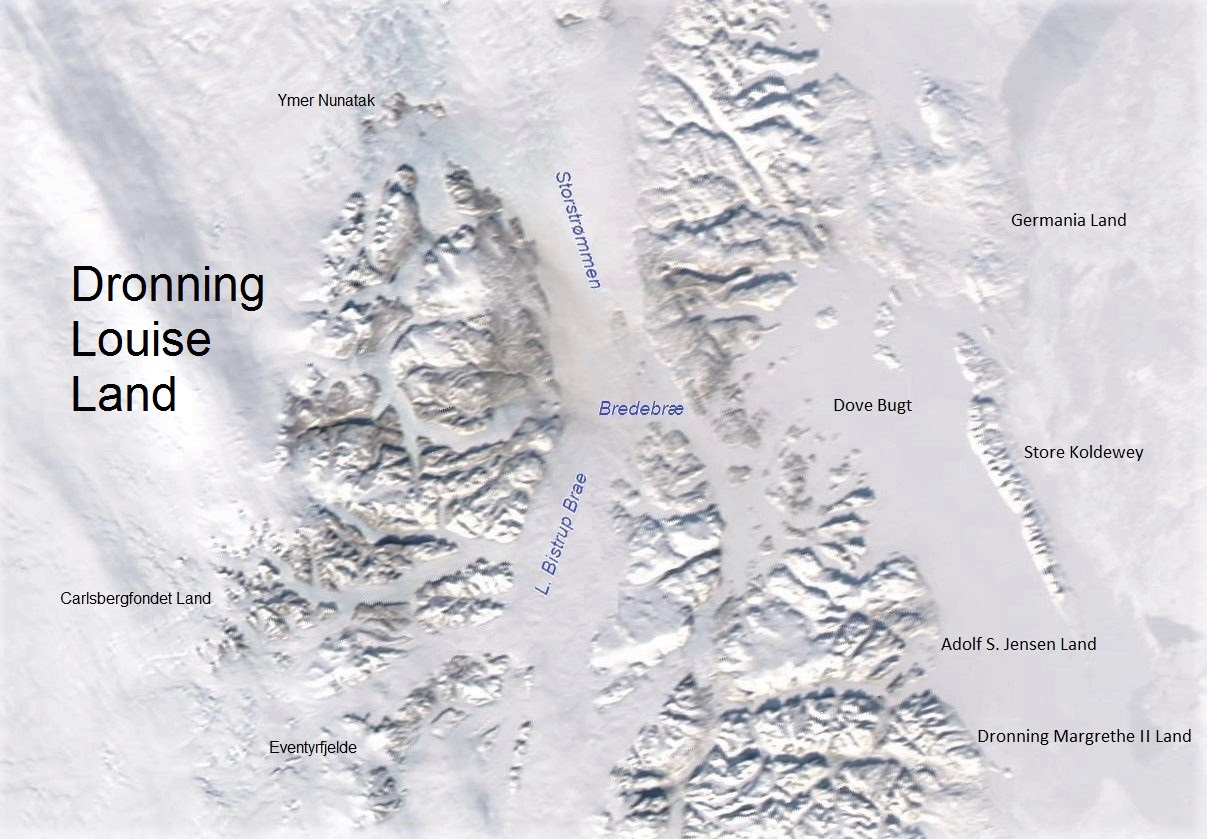
- Adolf S. Jensen Land in the southeast

- Location within Greenland

Geography
- Location: East Greenland
- Coordinates: 76°5′N 20°50′W
- Adjacent to: Inderbredningen; Dove Bay; Store Baelt; Bessel Fjord
- Length: 55 km (34.2 mi)
- Width: 30 km (19 mi)
- Highest elevation: 1,058 m (3471 ft)

Administration
- Greenland (Denmark)
- Zone: NE Greenland National Park

Demographics
- Population: Uninhabited

Adolf S. Jensen Land (Danish: Ad. S. Jensen Land) is a peninsula in the southern limit of King Frederick VIII Land, northeastern Greenland. Administratively it belongs to the NE Greenland National Park area.

== History ==
The landmass north of Bessel Fjord was deemed to be an island by the Second German North Polar Expedition led by Carl Koldewey that partially explored the area in 1869–70. Koldewey used the name 'Peschel Island' in the English edition of his 1869–70 narrative.

The area was later visited by the ill-fated 1906–08 Denmark Expedition (Danmark Ekspeditionen) which named a few landmarks, such as the narrow Syttendemajfjorden in the north. Finally the peninsula was surveyed and mapped in 1932 by Lauge Koch during aerial surveys made during the 1931–34 Three-year Expedition to East Greenland (Treårsekspeditionen). It was named after Danish zoologist Adolf Severin Jensen (1866 - 1953), professor at the University of Copenhagen, who had carried out extensive research on the fisheries of West Greenland, and who was a member of the committee of the 1931–34 Three-year Expedition.

Besselfjord Station was built in Adolf S. Jensen Land's southeastern shore. Also the Alf Bruun Hytta and the Carl Ritterhytta, Strømsbukta and Johns Hytta hunting huts were built in the eastern part of the peninsula, the latter three by John Giæver while he lived as a trapper in north-eastern Greenland from 1929 to 1934. The Nanok East Greenland Fishing Company built the hunting huts Laksehytten in 1939 and Fiskerhytten in 1951, both located at the head of Syttendemajfjorden, and Påskehytten, a hut in the east coast in 1938.

== Geography ==
Adolf S. Jensen Land is bounded in the west by the Soranerbraen Glacier —beyond which lies Rechnitzer Land, in the north by the Fangersund of the Inderbredningen and the Trangsund of the Dove Bay, in the east by the Storebaelt that opens into the Greenland Sea, and in the south by the Bessel Fjord. Queen Margrethe II Land lies to the south of the Bessel Fjord. Cape Karl Ritter is the peninsula's easternmost point and the Hawkins Vandfald waterfall is located in the southeastern part. There is an ice cap in the SW.

Adolf S. Jensen Land is hilly, except for a small area in the southeast, and its coastline is very indented. The peninsula in the north is almost separated from the southern part by a fjord and Elizabeth Sharon Lake. The highest elevations are in the southern part and are unnamed. Vivian Fjeld is a 1,003 m (3,291 ft) high mountain in the northern subpeninsula, Kapspidsen is a 502 m (1,647 ft) high mountain near the NE end.

Map of Northeastern Greenland.

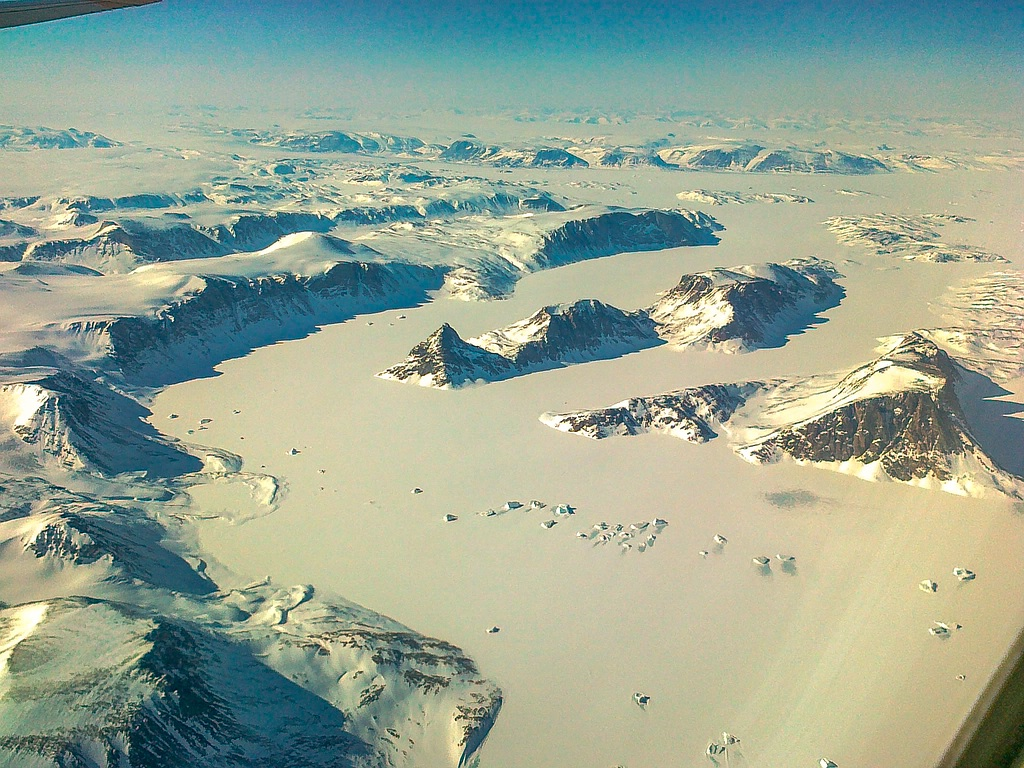
Northern shore of Adolf S. Jensen Land. Vivian Fjeld is the peak visible on the upper left. Tvillingerne island is in the middle and Nanok on the right.
