= Straumsida Bluff =

Straumsida Bluff (71°44′S 1°15′W) is an ice-covered bluff about 25 nautical miles (46 km) long, rising as part of the east slope of Ahlmann Ridge and overlooking the terminus of Jutulstraumen Glacier, in Queen Maud Land. Mapped by Norwegian cartographers from surveys and air photos by Norwegian-British-Swedish Antarctic Expedition (NBSAE) (1949–52) and air photos by the Norwegian expedition (1958–59) and named Straumsida (the stream side).
