= Storkletten Peak =

Mountain in Queen Maud Land, Antarctica

Storkletten Peak (72°3′S 3°25′W) is an ice-free mountain 1 nautical mile (1.9 km) south of Flarjuven Bluff on the Ahlmann Ridge in Queen Maud Land, Antarctica. It was mapped by Norwegian cartographers from surveys and air photos by Norwegian-British-Swedish Antarctic Expedition (NBSAE) (1949–52) and named Storkletten, meaning the big, steep mountain.
