= Antarctic Haven =

Bay in King Christian X Land, Northeastern Greenland

- Danish: Antarctichavn
- Location in Greenland
- Interactive map of Antarctic Haven
- Location: Arctic
- Coordinates: 72°2′N 23°7′W
- Ocean/sea sources: Davy Sound; Greenland Sea
- Basin countries: Greenland
- Max. length: 5 km (3.1 mi)
- Max. width: 3.5 km (2.2 mi)
- Settlements: Karlsbak Station, abandoned

Antarctic Haven (Danish: Antarctichavn) is a bay in King Christian X Land, Northeastern Greenland.

Administratively it lies in the Northeast Greenland National Park area.

== History ==
This natural harbour was named "Antarctics Hamn" by Swedish Arctic explorer Alfred Gabriel Nathorst after his ship Antarctic, which anchored there on 20 August 1899 during the Swedish Greenland Expedition in search of survivors of S. A. Andrée's Arctic balloon expedition of 1897.

J. K. Tornøe advanced the hypothesis that this bay might correspond to the ‘Finnsbúdir’ of the Sagas of Icelanders.

In the southern corner of the head of the bay there is a Norwegian hunting hut that originally had been known as "Karlsbak Station". It was built by Jonas Karlsbak and Odd Åmbak in 1930. The hut had a meteorological facility and Karlsbak/LMU was its radio station. The station was active in 1930–38 and again in 1946–59.

Close to the building there is a memorial to Norwegian explorer Helge Ingstad (1899 – 2001), who was using the Antarctic Haven hut as his residence when he wintered there as the Governor of Erik the Red's Land in the winter of 1932–33. Nowadays the name "Karlsbak" is used for a mountain to the east of the bay.

The historical Norwegian Antarctic Haven Station was restored in the summer 2001 by the Nanok East Greenland Fishing Company. It was destroyed in 2002 by an avalanche.

== Geography ==
This northeast-facing bay is located in NE Scoresby Land, at the southern end of the King Oscar Fjord, in the Davy Sound area. It is one of the small branches of the King Oscar Fjord system. Its mouth opens between Cape Syenit to the northwest and Knivodden to the southeast, about 20 km (12 mi) southeast of Mesters Vig. There are drying flats at the head of the bay.

The bay is mostly surrounded by high mountains. The Pictet Range is located to the west of the bay and Karlsbak to the southeast.

Map of Northeastern Greenland

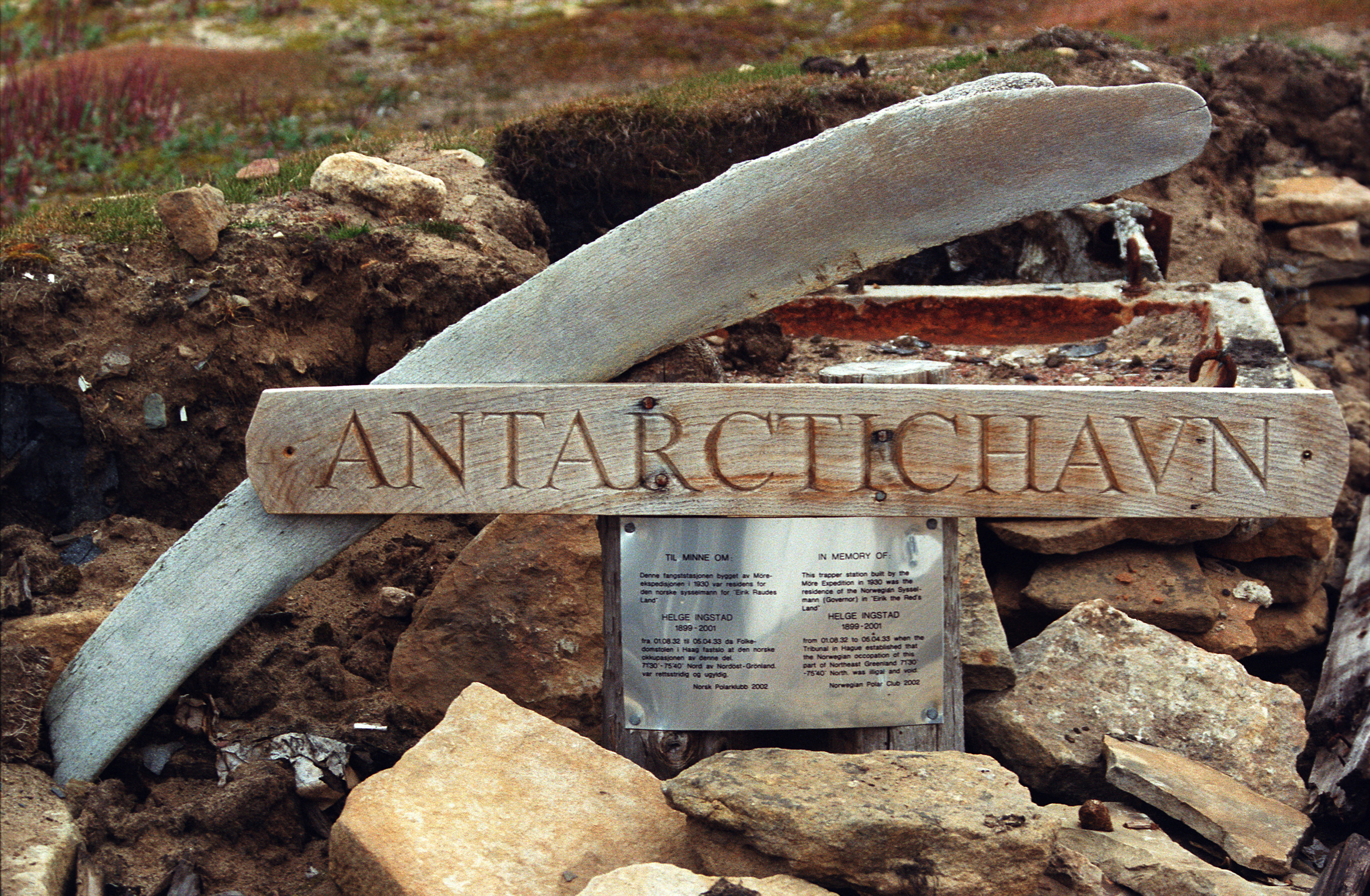
Helge Ingstad memorial in Antarctic Haven

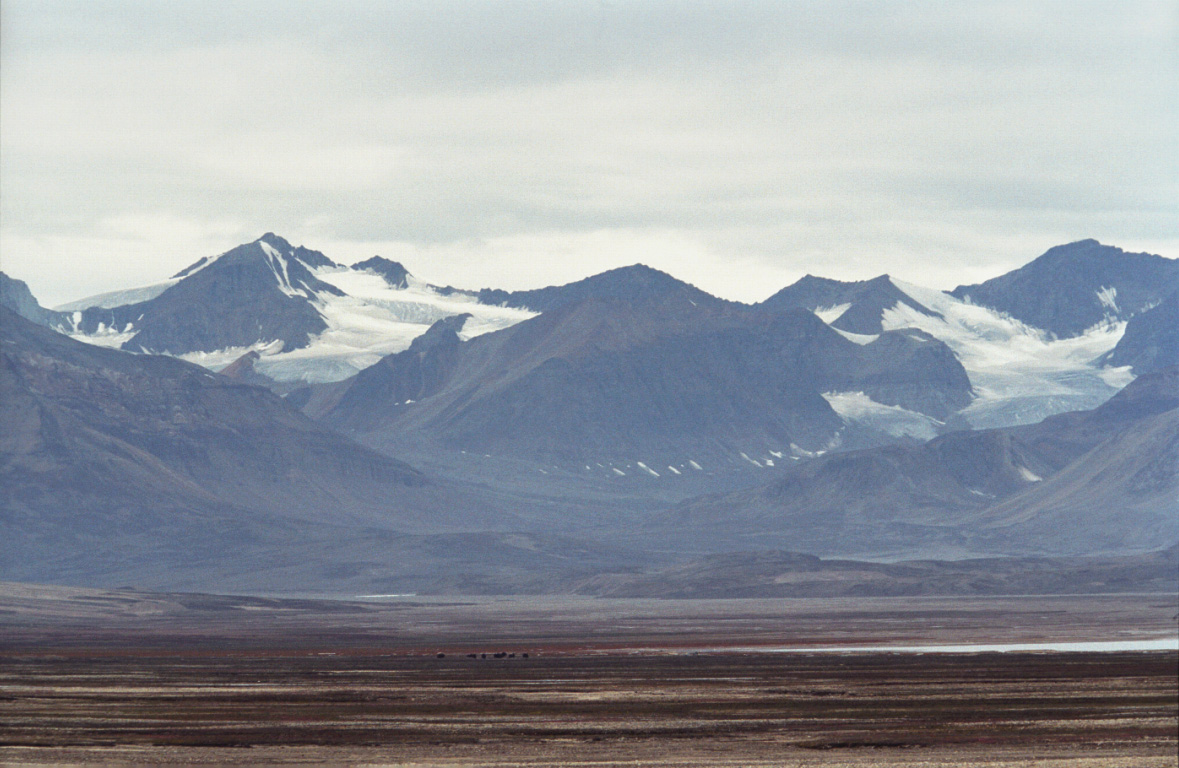
View of the mountains of the Pictet Range rising to the NW of the bay.

== Bibliography ==
- Spencer Apollonio, Lands That Hold One Spellbound: A Story of East Greenland, 2008

== See also ==
- List of fjords of Greenland
- Jónsbú Station
- Myggbukta
