= Horten Peak =

Mountain in Queen Maud Land, Antarctica

Horten Peak (72°4′S 3°11′E) is a small rock peak, 2,470 metres (8,100 ft) high, rising south of the summit of Risemedet Mountain in the Gjelsvik Mountains of Queen Maud Land, Antarctica. It was mapped by Norwegian cartographers from surveys and air photos by the Sixth Norwegian Antarctic Expedition (1956–60) and named by them.
