= Snøkallen Hill =

Snøkallen Hill (71°42′S 1°32′W) is a hill 3 nautical miles (5.6 km) south-southeast of Snøkjerringa Hill, on the east side of Ahlmann Ridge in Queen Maud Land, Antarctica. It was mapped by Norwegian cartographers from surveys and air photos by the Norwegian-British-Swedish Antarctic Expedition (1949–52). The name, snøkallen, comes from the Norwegian word for "the snowman," with the name of the neighboring hill, snøkjerringa, meaning "the snow woman".
