= Aurhø Peak =

Peak in Queen Maud Land, Antarctica

Highest point
- Coordinates: 72°8′S 3°11′W

Naming
- English translation: "Gravel height"

Geography
- Continent: Antarctica
- Range coordinates: 71°50′S 2°25′W
- Parent range: Ahlmann Ridge

Geology
- Mountain type: Peak

Aurhø Peak is a peak with a gravel moraine on the northwest side, situated 1 mile (1.6 km) east of Slettfjell in the Ahlmann Ridge of Queen Maud Land. It was mapped by Norwegian cartographers from surveys and from air photos by the Norwegian-British-Swedish Antarctic Expedition (1949–1952), led by John Schjelderup Giæver, and named "Aurhø" (gravel height).
