= Bessel Fjord =

Fjord in Greenland

- Location
- Location: Arctic
- Coordinates: 75°59′N 21°10′W
- Ocean/sea sources: Greenland Sea
- Basin countries: Greenland
- Max. length: 53 km (33 mi)
- Max. width: 4 km (2.5 mi)
- Frozen: Most of the year

Bessel Fjord is a fjord in northeastern Greenland. Administratively it belongs to the NE Greenland National Park area.

== History ==
The area around the mouth of this fjord was referred to as "Bessel Bay" at the time of the 1869–70 Second German North Polar Expedition led by Carl Koldewey. It was named after German astronomer and director of the Königsberg university observatory Friedrich Wilhelm Bessel (1784–1846). Later, the 1906–08 Denmark expedition applied the name to the fjord itself.

This fjord marked the northern border of Erik the Red's Land in 1932–1933.

== Geography ==
Bessel Fjord stretches north of Norlund Land from west to east for about 53 km. Troms Island lies in its mouth in the Greenland Sea. This fjord marks the border between King Frederick VIII Land to the north and King Christian X Land to the south. It is located in Erik the Red's Land, in the Greenland Caledonites. Adolf S. Jensen Land lies north of the fjord and Queen Margrethe II Land (Dronning Margrethe II Land) to the south.

== See also ==
- List of fjords of Greenland
