= Little Pendulum Island =

Island in Eastern Greenland

Native name: Lille Pedulum Ø
- Location within Greenland

Geography
- Location: Greenland Sea, Eastern Greenland
- Coordinates: 74°40′N 18°28′W
- Archipelago: Pendulum Islands
- Total islands: 3
- Major islands: Sabine Island, Little Pendulum
- Area: 57.8 km^{2} (22.3 sq mi)
- Highest elevation: 602 m (1975 ft)

Administration
- Greenland

Demographics
- Population: 0

Little Pendulum Island (Danish: Lille Pedulum Ø) is an island in Eastern Greenland, in the Northeast Greenland National Park.

== History ==
The island was named by Douglas Charles Clavering’s 1823 expedition, during which the Irish scientist Edward Sabine swung the pendulum on the largest of the islands (Sabine Island).

== Geography ==
Little Pendulum Island is located to the north east of Wollaston Foreland, and to the south of Shannon Island. Together with Sabine Island (formerly Inner Pendulum Island) and an islet named Walrus Island (Danish: Hvalros Ø) south of Sabine, it constitutes the Pendulum Islands.

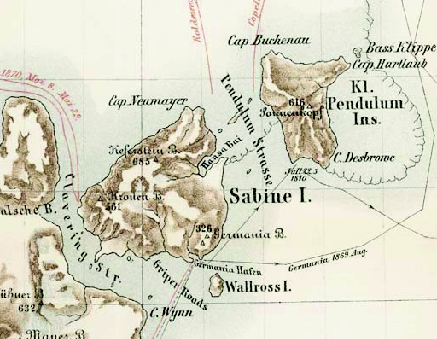
19th-century map of the Pendulum Islands. 2nd German Polar Expedition 1869–70.

== See also ==
- List of islands of Greenland
