= Flårjuven Bluff =

Bluff in Queen Maud Land, Antarctica

Flårjuven Bluff (72°2′S 3°24′W) is a flat-topped, largely ice-free bluff about 1 nautical mile (2 km) north of Storkletten Peak, on the Ahlmann Ridge in Queen Maud Land, Antarctica. It was mapped by Norwegian cartographers from surveys and air photos by the Norwegian–British–Swedish Antarctic Expedition (1949–52) and named Flårjuven. Aurnupen Peak lies 1 mile (1.6 km) north.
