= Douglas Clavering =

British naval officer and explorer

Douglas Charles Clavering
- Born: 8 September 1794; Edinburgh, Scotland
- Died: June 1827 (aged 32–33); Off the coast of West Africa
- Military career
- Allegiance: United Kingdom
- Branch: Royal Navy
- Service years: 1808–1827
- Rank: Captain
- Commands: Pheasant; Griper; Redwing
- Conflicts: Napoleonic Wars; War of 1812

Captain Douglas Charles Clavering RN FRS (8 September 1794 – mid-1827) was an officer of the British Royal Navy and Arctic explorer.

== Biography ==
=== Early life and career ===
Clavering was born at Holyrood House, the eldest son of Brigadier-General Henry Mordaunt Clavering and Lady Augusta Campbell, the daughter of John Campbell, 5th Duke of Argyll. His grandfather was Lieutenant-General John Clavering, who had served as Commander-in-Chief, India, from 1774.

Despite his impeccable military antecedents Clavering elected to serve in the Navy. Joining at a young age, he served as a midshipman under Sir Philip Broke in the frigate Shannon. Clavering distinguished himself during the battle with USS Chesapeake in June 1813, and was honourably mentioned in Broke's report. He then served as a lieutenant aboard the sloop-of-war Spey in the Mediterranean, and in 1821 was appointed commander of the sloop Pheasant, on the coast of Africa.

While on passage to join his ship, he struck up a close friendship with Captain Edward Sabine, who was travelling to Africa to commence a series of observations on the length of the seconds pendulum. At Clavering's request the Pheasant was chosen to carry Sabine while making his observations. These were made at Sierra Leone, the Island of St Thomas, Ascension Island, Bahia, Maranhão, Trinidad, Jamaica, and New York City. In the course of the voyage Clavering also made an extensive series of observations on the direction and force of the equatorial current and the Gulf Stream.

The results of Sabine's observations were published on the return of Pheasant to England, and the Board of Longitude determined that they should be continued to the most northerly latitude which was possible to reach. For this purpose the brig HMS Griper, which had already adapted for Arctic voyages, and used in William Parry's first expedition in 1819–20, was selected, and Clavering appointed to command her on 1 March 1823.

=== Arctic voyage, 1823 ===
Clavering prepared his ship at Deptford, loading enough stores to see the ship through an entire winter, should they become trapped in the ice. The Griper set sail on 11 May, sailing across the North Sea, and then north along the coast of Norway, making good time as far as the Lofoten islands, where calms and light airs delayed them slightly. They arrived at Hammerfest on 2 June. Sabine set up camp ashore and made his first set of observations, which were completed by 23 June.

Griper then sailed north for Spitsbergen in the Svalbard archipelago, landing on 1 June and setting up a camp of tents and huts for six men, Sabine, and his instruments. Meanwhile, Clavering sailed north, until blocked by pack ice at 80° 21' N, and returned on the 11th. While Sabine completed his observations Clavering made surveys, and his men supplemented their diet with fresh reindeer meat.

Griper sailed from Spitsbergen on 23 June, and headed for the east coast of Greenland. After making their way through ice floes, the ship finally reached the shore on 8 July, at around latitude 74°. They sailed north-east looking for a suitable landing place, and on 10 July discovered two islands, which Clavering later named the Pendulum Islands, (Little Pendulum Island and Sabine Island). The Griper continued north until blocked by ice. Clavering landed on an island he named Shannon Island, but realized he could go no further, so retraced his steps, and landed on the larger of the Pendulum Islands on 14 July to allow Sabine to set up camp and make his observations. The camp was located at 74°32′19″N 18°50′00″W. On the 16th Clavering set off in two boats, and with his midshipman Henry Foster, surveyed the coast between 72°30'N and 74°N, extending the 1822 observations of William Scoresby. Clavering also explored and named Loch Fyne. He observed several traces of habitation, and later made contact with a group of Northeast-Greenland Inuit. Clavering returned to the camp on 29 August to find that Sabine had almost completed his measurements. They struck camp and returned to the ship the next day.

Griper set sail on 31 August, heading south along the coast through ice floes, finally reaching open sea on 13 September. On the 23rd she arrived off the coast of Norway, finally anchoring off Trondheim on 6 October. Sabine completed his final set of observations, and Griper set sail for England on the 13th, though gales and unfavourable winds kept her embayed until 3 December, when she finally gained the open sea. Violent gales and electrical storms delayed her further, and she eventually returned to Deptford on 19 December 1823.

The website Glasgow's Cultural History includes an article about Clavering's Greenland voyages, noting that he named a small island "Jordanhill" and including a map of it and the surrounding area. The article is headed "“A Little Piece of Greenland that is forever Jordanhill”".

=== Disappearance and death ===
In January 1825 Clavering was appointed commander of brig-sloop Redwing on the West Africa Squadron, engaged in the suppression of the slave trade. Redwing sailed from Sierra Leone in June 1827 and was never seen again. Wreckage washed ashore in November near Mataceney suggested that lightning had started a fire that destroyed her.

== See also ==
- Clavering baronets
- Clavering Island
- List of people who disappeared mysteriously at sea
