= Shannon Island =

Large island in Northeast Greenland

Native name: Shannon Ø
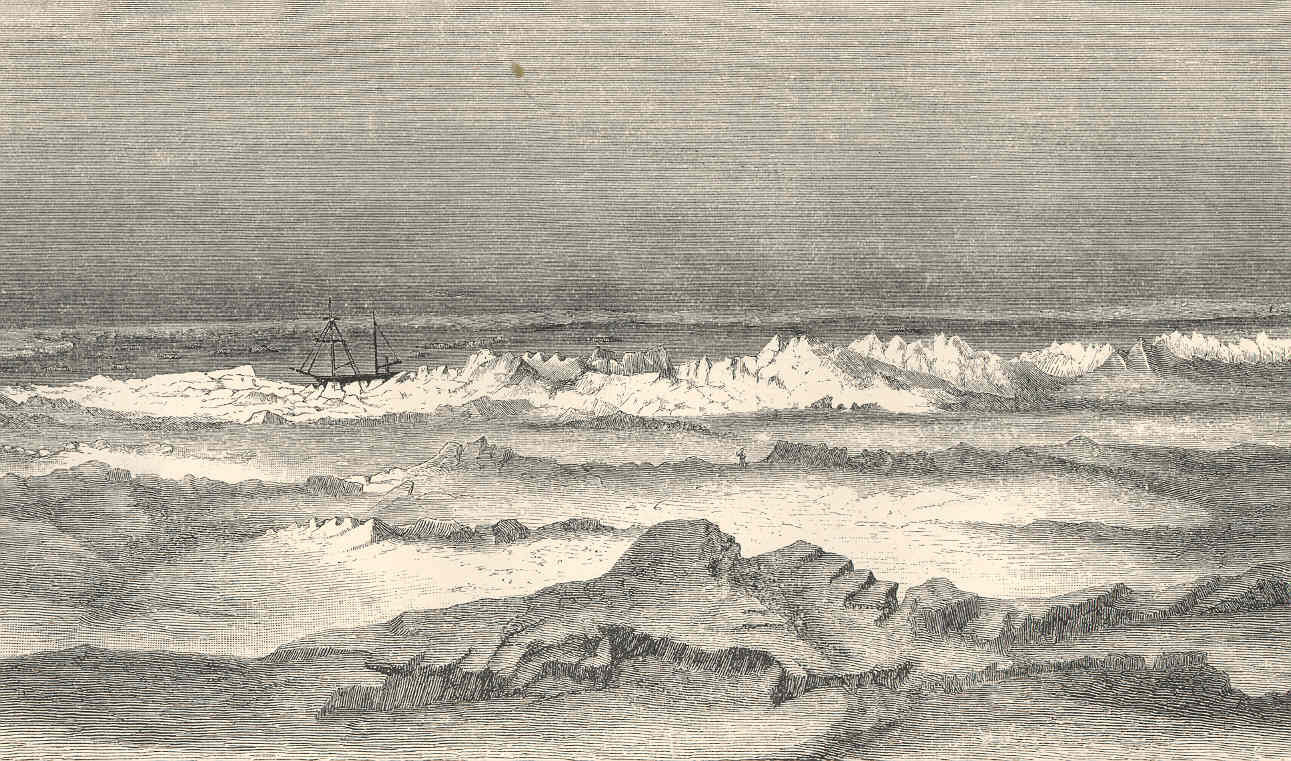
- The Germania on the Northern Coast of Shannon Island.

- Location of Shannon Island in Greenland
- Interactive map of Shannon Island
- Etymology: Named after the frigate HMS Shannon

Geography
- Location: Greenland Sea
- Coordinates: 75°10′N 18°20′W
- Area: 1,258.5 km^{2} (485.9 sq mi)
- Area rank: 9th largest in Greenland; 281st largest in world
- Highest elevation: 305 m (1001 ft)
- Highest point: Meyerstein Bjerg

Administration
- Greenland
- Unincorporated area: NE Greenland National Park

Demographics
- Population: 0 (2021)
- Pop. density: 0/km^{2} (0/sq mi)
- Ethnic groups: none

Shannon Island (Danish: Shannon Ø) is a large island in Northeast Greenland National Park in eastern Greenland, to the east of Hochstetter Foreland, with an area of 1,258.5 km^{2} (485.9 sq mi). It was named by Douglas Charles Clavering on his 1823 expedition for the Royal Navy frigate HMS Shannon, a 38-gun frigate on which he served as midshipman under Sir Philip Broke.

The island is also home to many different types of animals such as polar bears, walruses, ravens, and oxen.

== History ==
Most landmarks in the area were named by the Second German Polar Expedition under Carl Koldewey in 1869–70. Between October 1943 and June 1944, the German meteorological expedition Bassgeiger operated under difficult conditions at Kap Sussi on Shannon. Their ship Coburg was wrecked off Shannon. The station was discovered by hunters, but the crew was evacuated by air to Norway.

The island is the site of several hunter's cabins and is reputed to have especially favorable ice conditions.

Shannon Island is the setting for Jules Verne's novel "A Winter amid the Ice".

== Geography ==
Shannon Island is a coastal island, separated from Hochstetter Foreland in the mainland by the Shannon Sound, a 200 m deep sound of the Greenland Sea.

The islands that are located nearby are Kuhn Island to the southwest further inshore and the Pendulum Islands about 12 km to the south.

== Image gallery ==
Map of Northeastern Greenland

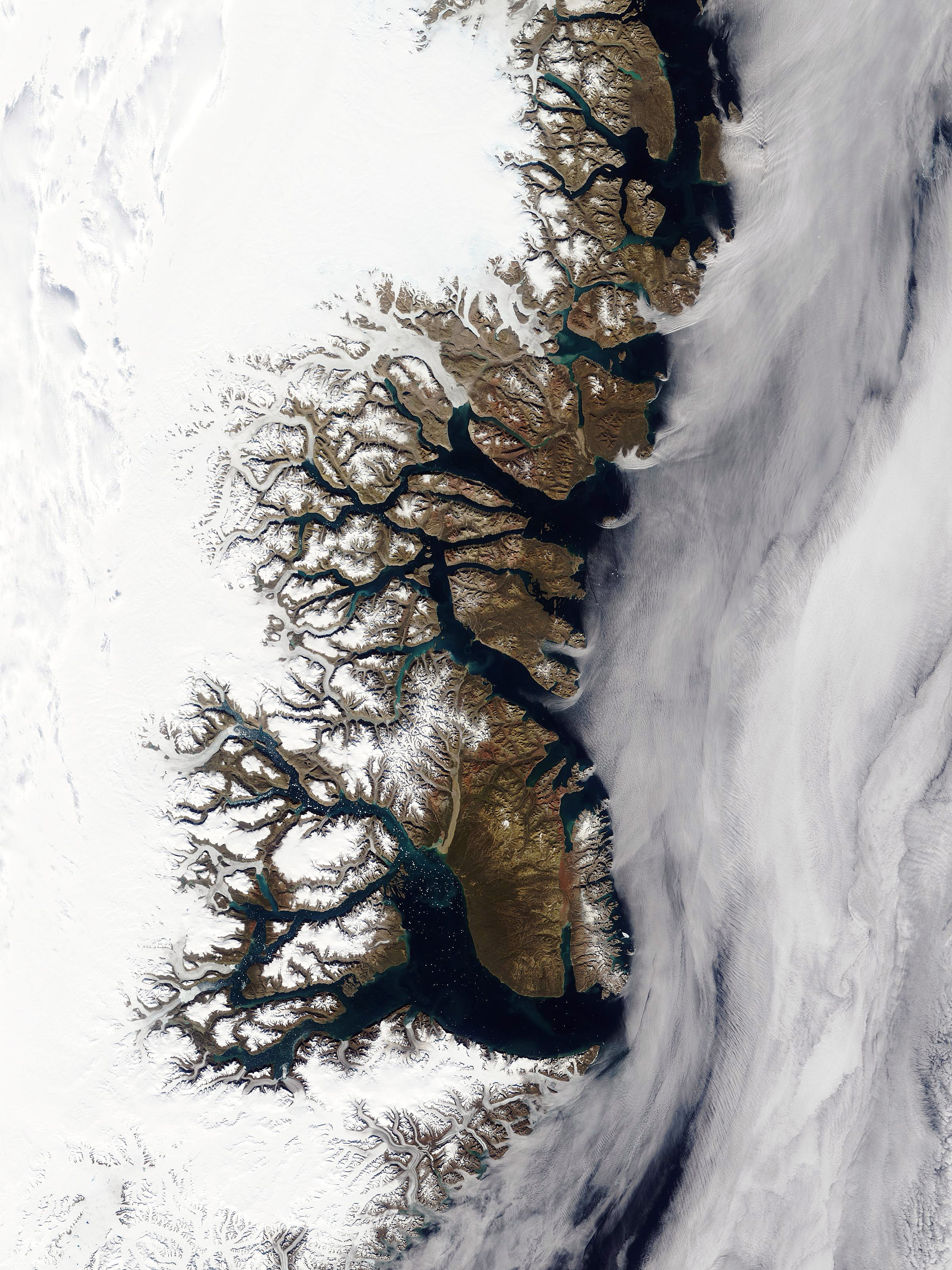
East Greenland Terra/MODIS satellite image

== See also ==
- List of islands of Greenland
