= John Schjelderup Giæver =

Norwegian author and polar researcher

- Born: 31 December 1901; Tromsø
- Died: 9 November 1970 (aged 68); Oslo
- Occupations: Author and polar researcher
- Spouse(s): Oddbjørg Jacobsen; Anna Margrethe Gløersen
- Children: 2
- Relatives: John Schjelderup Giæver; Thyra Høegh; Jens Holmboe
- Writing career
- Notable works: Illgjæringsmann, Maudheim. To år i Antarktis, Ishavets glade borgere
- Notable awards: Maudheim medal, Royal Geographical Society's Founder's Medal, St. Olav's Medal With Oak Branch

John Schjelderup Giæver (31 December 1901 – 9 November 1970) was a Norwegian author and polar researcher.

Jónsbú Station in NE Greenland was named after him.

== Personal life ==
He was born in Tromsø in Troms, Norway. He was the son of lawyer John Schjelderup Giæver (1864–1914) and his wife Thyra Høegh (1879–1954). He was the great-great-great-grandson of Jens Holmboe.

John Schjelderup Giæver married Oddbjørg Jacobsen in March 1940 and they had a son in April the same year. However, the marriage was dissolved. Giæver married Anna Margrethe Gløersen in 1948; this time they had a daughter, born 1954.

== Career ==
He took his secondary education in Trondheim in 1920, and then moved back to Tromsø. He started a newspaper career, as sub-editor of Tromsø Stiftstidende from 1921 to 1922. He was editor-in-chief in Vesteraalens Avis from 1922 to 1928 and Tromsø Stiftstidende from 1928 to 1929. He lived as a trapper in north-eastern Greenland from 1929 to 1934. In 1935 he was hired as secretary for Norges Svalbard- og Ishavsundersøkelser, the Norwegian institution for exploration of Svalbard and the Arctic Sea, later renamed into the Norwegian Polar Institute.

During World War II, he first fled to London where he worked as a secretary for the exiled government. From 1941 to 1944, he served with the Royal Norwegian Air Force-in-exile at Little Norway, Canada. In 1944, with the rank of Major, he was sent to Northern Norway to participate in the successful liberation from Nazi occupation. In 1947 he returned to the Norwegian Polar Institute as secretary, and from 1948 to 1960 he was office manager. However, he was still involved in the field as well, leading the wintering party of the Norwegian-British-Swedish Antarctic Expedition from 1949 to 1952.

Giæver published several books. His literary career began with Illgjerningsmand (A Misdeeder) (1921), which was translated into German in 1923. His book Maudheim. To år i Antarktis (1952), describing the Antarctic Expedition was translated into English, French, Dutch, Danish, Swedish, Finnish, German and Croatian. From 1955 on he renewed his literary authorship with numerous books of documentary and partly autobiographical topics, covering Arctic trapping, fishing and warfare.

Other books include Ishavets glade borgere (1956); Langt der oppe mot nord (1958), Rabagaster under polarstjernen (1959), Fra min barndoms elv til fjerne veidemarker (1960), Fra Little Norway til Karasjok (1964), Med rev bak øret (1965), Dyretråkk og fugletrekk på 74° nord (1967), Lys og skygger i sjøgata (1969), Den gang jeg drog av sted (1970) and Soldøgn og mørketid (1971).

Giæver was awarded the Maudheim medal in 1952 and the Royal Geographical Society's Founder's Medal in 1956, both for his leadership in the Norwegian-British-Swedish Antarctic Expedition. He also held the St. Olav's Medal With Oak Branch, the Defence Medal 1940 – 1945, the Haakon VII 70th Anniversary Medal and Knight first class of the Order of Vasa. He also received the King's Medal of Merit in gold and he was a member of the Explorer's Club in New York. In 1952, he was awarded the 25th Silver Wolf, the highest commendation of Norwegian Scouting.

He died in November 1970 in Oslo.

== See also ==
- Adolf S. Jensen Land
- Jonsbu
