= Ahlmann Ridge =

Ridge in Antarctica

Coordinates: 71°50′S 2°25′W

Ahlmann Ridge, also known as Ahlmannryggen, is a broad, mainly ice-covered ridge, about 110 km (70 mi) long, surmounted by scattered, low peaks. It rises between Schytt Glacier and Jutulstraumen Glacier and extends from Borg Massif northward to Fimbul Ice Shelf in Queen Maud Land. The area was first photographed from aircraft of the Third German Antarctic Expedition (1938–39) and peaks in this vicinity were roughly plotted. The Stein Nunataks and Witte Peaks, named by the German Antarctic Expedition, appear to coincide with the northeast part of the Ahlmann Ridge. The feature was mapped in detail from surveys and air photos by the Norwegian-British-Swedish Antarctic Expedition (NBSAE) (1949–1952) and air photos by the Norwegian expedition (1958–59). Named for Hans Wilhelmsson Ahlmann, chairman of the Swedish committee for the NBSAE.

Istindhalsen Saddle is an ice saddle between Istind Peak and the Grunehogna Peaks on the Ahlmann Ridge. Like the ridge, it was mapped by the NBSAE and the Norwegian expedition. It was named Istindhalsen meaning "the ice peak neck" in association with Istind Peak.

== Features ==
- Brautnuten Peak
- Kullen Knoll
- Ove Peak
- Nupshamrane Peaks
- Slettfjellklumpen Spur
- Slettfjellnutane Peaks
- Snøkallen Hill
- Straumsida Bluff
- Veslekletten Peak
- Vesletind Peak
