= List of ultras of North America =

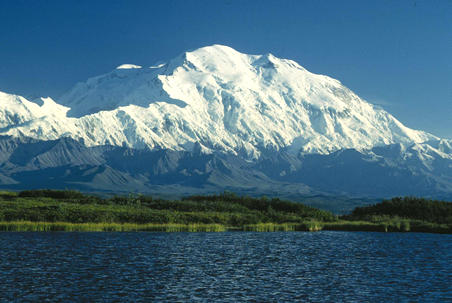
Denali in Alaska is the highest mountain peak of North America. Federally designated as Mount McKinley, it is the third most topographically prominent and third most topographically isolated summit on Earth after Mount Everest and Aconcagua.

The following sortable tables comprise the most topographically prominent mountain peaks of greater North America. Each of these 353 summits has at least 1500 meters (4921 feet) of topographic prominence.

This article defines greater North America as the portion of the continental landmass of the Americas extending westward and northward from the Isthmus of Panama plus the islands surrounding that landmass. This article defines the islands of North America to include the coastal islands of North America, the islands of the Caribbean Sea, the Lucayan Archipelago, the Bermuda Islands, the Islands of Greenland (Kalaallit Nunaat), the islands of Northern Canada, the islands of Alaska, and the islands of the northeastern Pacific Ocean. The Hawaiian Islands are not included because they are considered part of Oceania. With the exceptions of North Carolina's Mount Mitchell and New Hampshire's Mount Washington, all of the ultras in the United States are found west of the 100th parallel.

Topographic elevation is the vertical distance above the reference geoid, a mathematical model of the Earth's sea level as an equipotential gravitational surface. The topographic prominence of a summit is the elevation difference between that summit and the highest or key col to a higher summit. The topographic isolation of a summit is the minimum great-circle distance to a point of equal elevation.

All elevations in the 48 states of the contiguous United States include an elevation adjustment from the National Geodetic Vertical Datum of 1929 (NGVD 29) to the North American Vertical Datum of 1988 (NAVD 88). For further information, please see this United States National Geodetic Survey note. If a summit elevation or prominence has a range of values, the arithmetic mean is cited.

== Distribution ==
The majority of ultra-prominent peaks are in western North America (especially Alaska, Yukon, and British Columbia), as well as a sizeable minority of peaks along the coast of the southern half of Greenland and the northeastern part of Nunavut.

Country	Number
Canada	143 (Note: Six ultra-prominent peaks are on the Canada-US border and are counted for both countries' totals: Mount Fairweather, Mount Saint Elias, Mount Hubbard, Mount Cook, Mount Augusta, Devils Paw)
United States	122 (Note: Six ultra-prominent peaks are on the Canada-US border and are counted for both countries' totals: Mount Fairweather, Mount Saint Elias, Mount Hubbard, Mount Cook, Mount Augusta, Devils Paw)
Greenland (Denmark)	38
Mexico	26
Honduras	8 (Note: Cerro El Pital, which lies on the Honduras-El Salvador border, is counted for both countries' total)
Guatemala	6
El Salvador	4 (Note: Cerro El Pital, which lies on the Honduras-El Salvador border, is counted for both countries' total)
Costa Rica	3
Dominican Republic	3
Haiti	2
Nicaragua	2
Jamaica	1
Cuba	1
Panama	1

Subdivision	Number
British Columbia	103 (Note: Includes two summits on the BC-Alaska border: Mount Fairweather and Devils Paw)
Alaska	65 (Note: Includes four summits on the Alaska-Yukon border (Mount Saint Elias, Mount Hubbard, Mount Cook, and Mount Augusta), and two summits on the Alaska-British Columbia border (Mount Fairweather and Devils Paw))
Greenland	38
Yukon	19 (Note: Includes four summits on the Alaska-Yukon border (Mount Saint Elias, Mount Hubbard, Mount Cook, and Mount Augusta))
Nunavut	16
Alberta	9
California	9
Nevada	8
Utah	8
Washington	7
Arizona	5
Montana	4
Nuevo León	4
Oaxaca	4
Oregon	4
Puebla	4
Colorado	3
Idaho	3
Jalisco	3
México	3
Wyoming	3
Baja California Sur	2
Coahuila	2
Michoacán	2
Veracruz	2
Baja California	1
Guerrero	1
New Mexico	1
New Hampshire	1
Morelos	1
North Carolina	1
Northwest Territories	1
Querétaro	1
Tlaxcala	1

Incomplete list above

== Ultra-prominent summits ==
The following sortable table comprises the 353 ultra-prominent summits of greater North America. (Note: This article defines greater North America as the portion of the continental landmass of the Americas extending westward and northward from the Isthmus of Panama plus the ocean islands surrounding that landmass. This article defines the ocean islands of greater North America to include the coastal islands of North America, the islands of the Caribbean Sea, the Lucayan Archipelago, the islands of Greenland (Kalaallit Nunaat), the islands of Canada, and the islands of Alaska. The Hawaiian Islands are not included because they are considered part of Oceania.) Each of these peaks has at least 1500 meters (4921 feet) of topographic prominence. (Note: This article defines a significant summit as a summit with at least 100 meters (328.1 feet) of topographic prominence, and a major summit as a summit with at least 500 meters (1640 feet) of topographic prominence. An ultra-prominent summit is a summit with at least 1500 meters (4921 feet) of topographic prominence.)

The summit of a mountain or hill may be measured in three principal ways:

1. The topographic elevation of a summit measures the height of the summit above a geodetic sea level.
2. The topographic prominence of a summit is a measure of how high the summit rises above its surroundings.
3. The topographic isolation (or radius of dominance) of a summit measures how far the summit lies from its nearest point of equal elevation.

Denali is one of only three summits on Earth with more than 6000 meters (19,685 feet) of topographic prominence. Mount Logan exceeds 5000 meters (16,404 feet) of prominence. Four peaks of greater North America exceed 4000 meters (13,123 feet), ten exceed 3500 meters (11,483 feet), 17 exceed 3000 meters (9843 feet), 34 exceed 2500 meters (8202 feet), 100 exceed 2000 meters (6562 feet), and the following 353 ultra-prominent summits exceed 1500 meters (4921 feet) of topographic prominence.

The 353 ultra-prominent summits of greater North America
Rank	Mountain peak	Region	Mountain range	Elevation	Prominence	Isolation	Location
1	Denali (Note: The summit of Denali is the highest point of the Alaska Range, the State of Alaska, the United States of America, and greater North America. Federally designated as Mount McKinley, it is the third most topographically prominent and third most topographically isolated summit on Earth after Mount Everest and Aconcagua.) (Mount McKinley)	Alaska	Alaska Range	6190.5 m 20,310 ft	6141 m 20,146 ft	7,450.24	63.0690°N 151.0063°W
2	Mount Logan (Note: The summit of Mount Logan is the highest point of the Saint Elias Mountains, Yukon, and all of Canada.)	Yukon	Saint Elias Mountains	5956 m 19,541 ft	5247 m 17,215 ft	623 km 387 mi	60.5671°N 140.4055°W
3	Pico de Orizaba (Note: The summit of Pico de Orizaba is the highest point of Estado Libre y Soberano de Puebla, Estado Libre y Soberano de Veracruz de Ignacio de la Llave, and all of México.) (Citlaltépetl)	Puebla; Veracruz	Cordillera Neovolcanica	5636 m 18,491 ft	4922 m 16,148 ft	2,690.14	19.0305°N 97.2698°W
4	Mount Rainier (Note: The summit of Mount Rainier is the highest point of the Cascade Range and the U.S. State of Washington. Mount Rainier is the most prominent summit in the contiguous United States and the fourth most prominent in North America.) (Note: The elevation of Mount Rainier includes an adjustment of +1.914 m (6.28 ft) from NGVD 29 to NAVD 88.)	Washington	Cascade Range	4394 m 14,417 ft	4026 m 13,210 ft	1,176.72	46.8529°N 121.7604°W
5	Volcán Tajumulco (Note: The summit of Volcán Tajumulco is the highest point of the Sierra de las Nubes, the Republic of Guatemala, and all of Central America.)	Guatemala	Sierra de las Nubes	4220 m 13,845 ft	3990 m 13,091 ft	722 km 448 mi	15.0430°N 91.9037°W
6	Mount Fairweather (Fairweather Mountain)	Alaska; British Columbia	Saint Elias Mountains	4671 m 15,325 ft	3961 m 12,995 ft	200 km 124.4 mi	58.9064°N 137.5265°W
7	Chirripó Grande (Note: The summit of Chirripó Grande is the highest point of the Republic of Costa Rica.) (Cerro Chirripó)	Costa Rica	Cordillera de Talamanca	3819 m 12,530 ft	3755 m 12,320 ft	878 km 546 mi	9.4843°N 83.4889°W
8	Gunnbjørn Fjeld (Note: The summit of Gunnbjørn Fjeld is the highest point of the Island of Greenland, Kalaallit Nunaat, the Kingdom of Denmark, and the entire Arctic.)	Greenland	Island of Greenland	3694 m 12,119 ft	3694 m 12,119 ft	3,254.13	68.9184°N 29.8991°W
9	Mount Blackburn (Note: The summit of Mount Blackburn is the highest point of the Wrangell Mountains.)	Alaska	Wrangell Mountains	4996 m 16,390 ft	3548 m 11,640 ft	97.6 km 60.7 mi	61.7305°N 143.4031°W
10	Mount Hayes (Note: The summit of Mount Hayes is the highest point of the Hayes Range.)	Alaska	Alaska Range	4216 m 13,832 ft	3507 m 11,507 ft	202 km 125.5 mi	63.6203°N 146.7178°W
11	Mount Saint Elias	Alaska; Yukon	Saint Elias Mountains	5489 m 18,009 ft	3429 m 11,250 ft	41.3 km 25.6 mi	60.2927°N 140.9307°W
12	Mount Waddington (Note: The summit of Mount Waddington is the highest point of the Coast Mountains.)	British Columbia	Coast Mountains	4019 m 13,186 ft	3289 m 10,791 ft	562 km 349 mi	51.3737°N 125.2636°W
13	Mount Marcus Baker (Note: The summit of Mount Marcus Baker is the highest point of the Chugach Mountains.)	Alaska	Chugach Mountains	4016 m 13,176 ft	3277 m 10,751 ft	203 km 126.3 mi	61.4374°N 147.7525°W
14	Pico Duarte (Note: The summit of Pico Duarte is the highest point of the Dominican Republic, the Island of Hispaniola, and all islands of the Caribbean Sea.)	Dominican Republic	Island of Hispaniola	3098 m 10,164 ft	3098 m 10,164 ft	941 km 584 mi	19.0231°N 70.9977°W
15	Mount Lucania (Note: The summit of Mount Lucania is the highest point of the northern Saint Elias Mountains.)	Yukon	Saint Elias Mountains	5260 m 17,257 ft	3080 m 10,105 ft	43 km 26.7 mi	61.0215°N 140.4661°W
16	Mount Whitney (Note: The summit of Mount Whitney is the highest point of the Sierra Nevada, the State of California, and the contiguous United States.)	California	Sierra Nevada	4421 m 14,505 ft	3072 m 10,080 ft	2,649.47	36.5786°N 118.2920°W
17	Popocatépetl	México; Morelos; Puebla	Cordillera Neovolcanica	5410 m 17,749 ft	3040 m 9,974 ft	143 km 88.8 mi	19.0225°N 98.6278°W
18	Mount Shasta (Note: The summit of Mount Shasta is the highest point of the southern Cascade Range.)	California	Cascade Range	4321.8 m 14,179 ft	2979 m 9,772 ft	539 km 335 mi	41.4092°N 122.1949°W
19	Monarch Mountain (Note: The summit of Monarch Mountain is the highest point of the Monarch Icefield.)	British Columbia	Coast Mountains	3555 m 11,663 ft	2925 m 9,596 ft	71.4 km 44.4 mi	51.8995°N 125.8760°W
20	Shishaldin Volcano (Note: The summit of Shishaldin Volcano is the highest point of Unimak Island and the Aleutian Islands.)	Alaska	Unimak Island	2869 m 9,414 ft	2869 m 9,414 ft	877 km 545 mi	54.7554°N 163.9709°W
21	Mount Robson (Note: The summit of Mount Robson is the highest point of the Canadian Rockies.)	British Columbia	Canadian Rockies	3959 m 12,989 ft	2829 m 9,281 ft	460 km 286 mi	53.1105°N 119.1566°W
22	Redoubt Volcano (Note: The summit of Redoubt Volcano is the highest point of the Chigmit Mountains.)	Alaska	Chigmit Mountains	3108 m 10,197 ft	2788 m 9,147 ft	94.5 km 58.7 mi	60.4854°N 152.7442°W
23	Mount Elbert (Note: The summit of Mount Elbert is the highest point of the U.S. State of Colorado, the Rocky Mountains of North America, and the entire Mississippi River drainage basin.)	Colorado	Sawatch Range	4401.2 m 14,440 ft	2772 m 9,093 ft	1,079.15	39.1178°N 106.4454°W
24	Mount Sir Wilfrid Laurier (Note: The summit of Mount Sir Wilfrid Laurier is the highest point of the Cariboo Mountains.)	British Columbia	Columbia Mountains	3516 m 11,535 ft	2728 m 8,950 ft	51.7 km 32.1 mi	52.8015°N 119.7315°W
25	Nevado de Colima (Note: The summit of Nevado de Colima is the highest point of Estado Libre y Soberano de Jalisco.)	Jalisco	Cordillera Neovolcanica	4270 m 14,009 ft	2720 m 8,924 ft	405 km 252 mi	19.5633°N 103.6087°W
26	Mount Vancouver	Yukon	Saint Elias Mountains	4812 m 15,787 ft	2712 m 8,898 ft	44 km 27.4 mi	60.3589°N 139.6980°W
27	Mount Sir Sandford (Note: The summit of Mount Sir Sandford is the highest point of the Columbia Mountains.)	British Columbia	Columbia Mountains	3519 m 11,545 ft	2703 m 8,868 ft	62 km 38.5 mi	51.6566°N 117.8676°W
28	Mount Baker (Note: The summit of Mount Baker is the highest point of the northern Cascade Range.) (Note: The elevation of Mount Baker includes an adjustment of +1.43 m (4.69 ft) from NGVD 29 to NAVD 88.)	Washington	Skagit Range	3287 m 10,786 ft	2696 m 8,845 ft	212 km 131.5 mi	48.7768°N 121.8145°W
29	Mount Torbert (Note: The summit of Mount Torbert is the highest point of the Tordrillo Mountains.)	Alaska	Alaska Range	3479 m 11,413 ft	2648 m 8,688 ft	157.3 km 97.7 mi	61.4086°N 152.4125°W
30	Pic la Selle (Note: The summit of Pic la Selle is the highest point of the Republic of Haiti.)	Haiti	Island of Hispaniola	2674 m 8,773 ft	2644 m 8,675 ft	126.6 km 78.7 mi	18.3602°N 71.9767°W
31	Barbeau Peak (Note: The summit of Barbeau Peak is the highest point of Ellesmere Island and Nunavut of Canada.)	Nunavut	Ellesmere Island	2616 m 8,583 ft	2616 m 8,583 ft	796 km 495 mi	81.9148°N 75.0093°W
32	San Jacinto Peak (Note: The summit of San Jacinto Peak is the highest point of the San Jacinto Mountains.)	California	San Jacinto Mountains	3302.3 m 10,834 ft	2542 m 8,339 ft	32.7 km 20.3 mi	33.8147°N 116.6794°W
33	San Gorgonio Mountain (Note: The summit of San Gorgonio Mountain is the highest point of the San Bernardino Mountains.) (Note: The elevation of San Gorgonio Mountain includes an adjustment of +1.303 m (4.27 ft) from NGVD 29 to NAVD 88.)	California	San Bernardino Mountains	3506 m 11,503 ft	2528 m 8,294 ft	262 km 162.5 mi	34.0992°N 116.8249°W
34	Charleston Peak (Note: The summit of Charleston Peak is the highest point of the Spring Mountains.) (Mount Charleston)	Nevada	Spring Mountains	3632 m 11,916 ft	2517 m 8,258 ft	218 km 135.1 mi	36.2716°N 115.6956°W
35	Mount Pavlof (Note: The summit of Mount Pavlof is the highest point of the Alaska Peninsula.)	Alaska	Alaska Peninsula	2515 m 8,250 ft	2499 m 8,200 ft	151.8 km 94.3 mi	55.4173°N 161.8932°W
35	Mount Veniaminof (Note: The summit of Mount Veniaminof is the highest point of the Alaska Peninsula.)	Alaska	Alaska Peninsula	2507 m 8,225 ft	2499 m 8,200 ft	337 km 209 mi	56.2194°N 159.2975°W
37	Mount Adams	Washington	Cascade Range	3743.4 m 12,281 ft	2480 m 8,136 ft	73.6 km 45.8 mi	46.2024°N 121.4909°W
38	Skihist Mountain (Note: The summit of Skihist Mountain is the highest point of the Lillooet Range.)	British Columbia	Coast Mountains	2968 m 9,738 ft	2458 m 8,064 ft	157.1 km 97.6 mi	50.1878°N 121.9032°W
39	Mount Hubbard	Alaska; Yukon	Saint Elias Mountains	4557 m 14,951 ft	2457 m 8,061 ft	34.4 km 21.3 mi	60.3194°N 139.0726°W
40	Mount Ratz (Note: The summit of Mount Ratz is the highest point of the Boundary Ranges.)	British Columbia	Coast Mountains	3090 m 10,138 ft	2430 m 7,972 ft	311 km 193.4 mi	57.3930°N 132.3031°W
41	Mount Odin (Note: The summit of Mount Odin is the highest point of the Gold Range.)	British Columbia	Columbia Mountains	2971 m 9,747 ft	2409 m 7,904 ft	65.4 km 40.7 mi	50.5518°N 118.1293°W
42	Mount Isto (Note: The summit of Mount Isto is the highest point of the Brooks Range.)	Alaska	Brooks Range	2736 m 8,976 ft	2408 m 7,901 ft	634 km 394 mi	69.2025°N 143.8020°W
43	Mount Monashee (Note: The summit of Mount Monashee is the highest point of the Monashee Mountains.)	British Columbia	Columbia Mountains	3274 m 10,741 ft	2404 m 7,887 ft	51.8 km 32.2 mi	52.3853°N 118.9399°W
44	Iliamna Volcano	Alaska	Chigmit Mountains	3053 m 10,016 ft	2398 m 7,866 ft	54.1 km 33.6 mi	60.0321°N 153.0915°W
45	Mount Olympus (Note: The summit of Mount Olympus is the highest point of the Olympic Mountains.)	Washington	Olympic Mountains	2432.3 m 7,980 ft	2389 m 7,838 ft	173.7 km 108 mi	47.8013°N 123.7108°W
46	Mount Columbia	Alberta; British Columbia	Canadian Rockies	3741 m 12,274 ft	2371 m 7,779 ft	158 km 98.2 mi	52.1473°N 117.4416°W
47	Mount Queen Bess (Note: The summit of Mount Queen Bess is the highest point of the Homathko Icefield.)	British Columbia	Coast Mountains	3298 m 10,820 ft	2355 m 7,726 ft	45.5 km 28.2 mi	51.2714°N 124.5682°W
48	Mount Cook	Alaska; Yukon	Saint Elias Mountains	4194 m 13,760 ft	2350 m 7,710 ft	23.4 km 14.54 mi	60.1816°N 139.9811°W
49	Mount Hood (Note: The summit of Mount Hood is the highest point of the Oregon Cascades and the U.S. State of Oregon.)	Oregon	Cascade Range	3428.8 m 11,249 ft	2349 m 7,706 ft	92.2 km 57.3 mi	45.3735°N 121.6959°W
50	Mount Sanford	Alaska	Wrangell Mountains	4949 m 16,237 ft	2343 m 7,687 ft	64.8 km 40.3 mi	62.2132°N 144.1292°W
51	Mount Tom White	Alaska	Chugach Mountains	3411 m 11,191 ft	2329 m 7,641 ft	117.6 km 73 mi	60.6518°N 143.6972°W
52	Mount Cooper (Note: The summit of Mount Cooper is the highest point of the Goat Range.)	British Columbia	Columbia Mountains	3094 m 10,151 ft	2319 m 7,608 ft	42.5 km 26.4 mi	50.1797°N 117.1992°W
53	Wheeler Peak (Note: The summit of Wheeler Peak is the highest point of the Snake Range.)	Nevada	Snake Range	3982.3 m 13,065 ft	2307 m 7,568 ft	373 km 232 mi	38.9858°N 114.3139°W
54	Ulysses Mountain (Note: The summit of Ulysses Mountain is the highest point of the Far Northern Rockies.) (Note: Ulysses Mountain is the northernmost 3000-metre (9843-foot) summit of the Rocky Mountains.) (Mount Ulysses)	British Columbia	Muskwa Ranges	3024 m 9,921 ft	2294 m 7,526 ft	436 km 271 mi	57.3464°N 124.0928°W
55	Glacier Peak (Note: The elevation of Glacier Peak includes an adjustment of +1.492 m (4.9 ft) from NGVD 29 to NAVD 88.)	Washington	Cascade Range	3214 m 10,545 ft	2291 m 7,518 ft	90.2 km 56 mi	48.1125°N 121.1138°W
56	Mount Kimball (Note: The summit of Mount Kimball is the highest point of the Delta Range.)	Alaska	Alaska Range	3155 m 10,350 ft	2263 m 7,425 ft	89.8 km 55.8 mi	63.2390°N 144.6419°W
57	Blue Mountain Peak	Jamaica	Island of Jamaica	2256 m 7,402 ft	2256 m 7,402 ft	273 km 169.5 mi	18.0465°N 76.5788°W
58	Wedge Mountain	British Columbia	Coast Mountains	2892 m 9,488 ft	2249 m 7,379 ft	63.9 km 39.7 mi	50.1330°N 122.7933°W
59	Otter Mountain	British Columbia	Coast Mountains	2692 m 8,832 ft	2242 m 7,356 ft	25.4 km 15.78 mi	56.0066°N 129.6928°W
60	Mount Griggs	Alaska	Alaska Peninsula	2332 m 7,650 ft	2225 m 7,300 ft	218 km 135.4 mi	58.3534°N 155.0958°W
61	Nevado de Toluca (Volcán Xinantécatl)	México	Cordillera Neovolcanica	4690 m 15,387 ft	2225 m 7,300 ft	118.4 km 73.6 mi	19.1020°N 99.7677°W
61	Kwatna Peak	British Columbia	Coast Mountains	2290 m 7,513 ft	2225 m 7,300 ft	36.9 km 22.9 mi	52.0706°N 126.9630°W
63	Outlook Peak (Note: The summit of Outlook Peak is the highest point of Axel Heiberg Island.)	Nunavut	Axel Heiberg Island	2210 m 7,251 ft	2210 m 7,251 ft	268 km 166.3 mi	79.7397°N 91.4061°W
64	Mount Foraker	Alaska	Alaska Range	5304 m 17,400 ft	2210 m 7,250 ft	23 km 14.27 mi	62.9604°N 151.3998°W
65	Golden Hinde (Note: The summit of Golden Hinde is the highest point of Vancouver Island.)	British Columbia	Vancouver Island	2197 m 7,208 ft	2197 m 7,208 ft	134.3 km 83.4 mi	49.6627°N 125.7470°W
66	White Mountain Peak (Note: The summit of White Mountain Peak is the highest point of the White Mountains.)	California	White Mountains	4344 m 14,252 ft	2193 m 7,196 ft	108.6 km 67.4 mi	37.6341°N 118.2557°W
67	Mount Crillon	Alaska	Saint Elias Mountains	3879 m 12,726 ft	2187 m 7,176 ft	31.4 km 19.52 mi	58.6625°N 137.1712°W
68	Stauning Alper	Greenland	Island of Greenland	2831 m 9,288 ft	2181 m 7,156 ft	164.9 km 102.5 mi	72.1167°N 24.9000°W
69	Cerro Teotepec (Note: The summit of Cerro Teotepec is the highest point of Estado Libre y Soberano de Guerrero.)	Guerrero	Sierra Madre del Sur	3550 m 11,647 ft	2180 m 7,152 ft	185 km 114.9 mi	17.4682°N 100.1364°W
70	Scud Peak	British Columbia	Coast Mountains	2987 m 9,800 ft	2172 m 7,126 ft	57.4 km 35.7 mi	57.2412°N 131.1676°W
71	Keele Peak (Note: The summit of Keele Peak is the highest point of the Mackenzie Mountains.)	Yukon	Mackenzie Mountains	2952 m 9,685 ft	2161 m 7,090 ft	543 km 337 mi	63.4314°N 130.3243°W
72	Cloud Peak (Note: The summit of Cloud Peak is the highest point of the Bighorn Mountains.)	Wyoming	Bighorn Mountains	4013.3 m 13,167 ft	2157 m 7,077 ft	233 km 145 mi	44.3821°N 107.1739°W
73	Gannett Peak (Note: The summit of Gannett Peak is the highest point of the Wind River Range, the U.S. State of Wyoming, and the central Rocky Mountains.)	Wyoming	Wind River Range	4209.1 m 13,809 ft	2157 m 7,076 ft	467 km 290 mi	43.1842°N 109.6542°W
74	Razorback Mountain (Note: The summit of Razorback Mountain is the highest point of the Niut Range.)	British Columbia	Coast Mountains	3183 m 10,443 ft	2153 m 7,064 ft	36.5 km 22.7 mi	51.5905°N 124.6912°W
75	Mount Vsevidof (Note: The summit of Mount Vsevidof is the highest point of Umnak Island.)	Alaska	Umnak Island	2149 m 7,051 ft	2149 m 7,051 ft	358 km 223 mi	53.1256°N 168.6938°W
76	Mount Odin (Note: The summit of Mount Odin is the highest point of Baffin Island.)	Nunavut	Baffin Island	2143 m 7,031 ft	2143 m 7,031 ft	586 km 364 mi	66.5468°N 65.4289°W
77	Cerro el Nacimiento (Note: The summit of Cerro el Nacimiento is the highest point of Sierra Madre del Sur and Estado Libre y Soberano de Oaxaca.)	Oaxaca	Sierra Madre del Sur	3710 m 12,172 ft	2140 m 7,021 ft	329 km 205 mi	16.2115°N 96.1967°W
78	Mount Hesperus (Note: The summit of Mount Hesperus is the highest point of the western Alaska Range.)	Alaska	Alaska Range	2996 m 9,828 ft	2127 m 6,978 ft	93.5 km 58.1 mi	61.8036°N 154.1469°W
79	Picacho del Diablo	Baja California	Sierra de San Pedro Mártir	3095 m 10,154 ft	2125 m 6,972 ft	335 km 208 mi	30.9925°N 115.3753°W
80	Mount Farnham (Note: The summit of Mount Farnham is the highest point of the Purcell Mountains.)	British Columbia	Columbia Mountains	3493 m 11,460 ft	2123 m 6,965 ft	72.7 km 45.2 mi	50.4888°N 116.4871°W
81	Palup Qaqa High Point	Greenland	Island of Palup Qaqa	2105 m 6,906 ft	2105 m 6,906 ft	31.2 km 19.4 mi	71.3333°N 52.8167°W
82	Mount Bona (Note: The summit of Mount Bona is the highest point of the northwest Saint Elias Mountains.)	Alaska	Saint Elias Mountains	5044 m 16,550 ft	2103 m 6,900 ft	80 km 49.7 mi	61.3856°N 141.7495°W
83	Oscar Peak	British Columbia	Coast Mountains	2336 m 7,664 ft	2099 m 6,886 ft	35.5 km 22 mi	54.9289°N 129.0594°W
84	Pic Macaya	Haiti	Island of Hispaniola	2347 m 7,700 ft	2087 m 6,847 ft	216 km 134.5 mi	18.3822°N 74.0243°W
85	Montaña de Santa Bárbara	Honduras	Santa Bárbara	2744 m 9,003 ft	2084 m 6,837 ft	74 km 46 mi	14.9137°N 88.1145°W
86	Mount Assiniboine	Alberta; British Columbia	Canadian Rockies	3616 m 11,864 ft	2082 m 6,831 ft	141.8 km 88.1 mi	50.8696°N 115.6509°W
87	Mount Jancowski	British Columbia	Coast Mountains	2729 m 8,953 ft	2079 m 6,821 ft	124 km 77.1 mi	56.3372°N 129.9817°W
88	Cerro Las Minas (Note: The summit of Cerro Las Minas is the highest point of the Republic of Honduras.)	Honduras	Sierra de las Nubes	2849 m 9,347 ft	2069 m 6,788 ft	132 km 82 mi	14.5340°N 88.6804°W
89	Mount Drum	Alaska	Wrangell Mountains	3661 m 12,010 ft	2060 m 6,760 ft	28.5 km 17.73 mi	62.1159°N 144.6394°W
90	Gladsheim Peak	British Columbia	Columbia Mountains	2830 m 9,285 ft	2056 m 6,745 ft	53.4 km 33.2 mi	49.7867°N 117.6272°W
91	Milne Land High Point	Greenland	Island of Milne Land	2050 m 6,726 ft	2050 m 6,726 ft	58.1 km 36.1 mi	70.8194°N 26.5956°W
92	Mount Dawson	British Columbia	Columbia Mountains	3377 m 11,079 ft	2045 m 6,709 ft	63.4 km 39.4 mi	51.1516°N 117.4206°W
92	Payers Tinde	Greenland	Island of Greenland	2320 m 7,612 ft	2045 m 6,709 ft	26.1 km 16.24 mi	73.1333°N 26.3667°W
94	Beitstad Peak	Nunavut	Ellesmere Island	2347 m 7,700 ft	2044 m 6,706 ft	354 km 220 mi	78.8007°N 79.5292°W
95	Mount Chiginagak	Alaska	Aleutian Range	2111 m 6,925 ft	2035 m 6,675 ft	157 km 97.6 mi	57.1334°N 156.9912°W
96	Mount Edith Cavell	Alberta	Canadian Rockies	3363 m 11,033 ft	2033 m 6,670 ft	47.2 km 29.3 mi	52.6672°N 118.0569°W
97	Alsek Peak	Yukon	Saint Elias Mountains	2740 m 8,990 ft	2025 m 6,644 ft	68.5 km 42.5 mi	60.0325°N 137.5915°W
98	Mount Valpy	British Columbia	Coast Mountains	2219 m 7,280 ft	2014 m 6,608 ft	49.4 km 30.7 mi	54.2750°N 129.0564°W
99	Perserajoq	Greenland	Island of Greenland	2259 m 7,411 ft	2009 m 6,591 ft	527 km 328 mi	71.4000°N 51.9667°W
100	Mount Cairnes	Yukon	Saint Elias Mountains	2820 m 9,252 ft	2000 m 6,562 ft	40.2 km 25 mi	60.8683°N 138.2764°W
101	Grand Teton (Note: The summit of Grand Teton is the highest point of the Teton Range.)	Wyoming	Teton Range	4198.7 m 13,775 ft	1995 m 6,545 ft	111.6 km 69.4 mi	43.7412°N 110.8024°W
102	Volcán de Agua	Guatemala	Escuintla	3761 m 12,339 ft	1981 m 6,499 ft	14.86 km 9.23 mi	14.4654°N 90.7428°W
102	Chatsquot Mountain	British Columbia	Coast Mountains	2365 m 7,759 ft	1981 m 6,499 ft	57.7 km 35.8 mi	53.1422°N 127.4773°W
104	Pico Turquino (Note: The summit of Pico Turquino is the highest point of the island and Republic of Cuba.)	Cuba	Island of Cuba	1974 m 6,476 ft	1974 m 6,476 ft	217 km 134.7 mi	19.9898°N 76.8360°W
105	Buckwell Peak	British Columbia; Yukon	Saint Elias Mountains	2721 m 8,927 ft	1971 m 6,467 ft	56.4 km 35 mi	59.4188°N 136.7653°W
106	Sierra de Minas Viejas	Nuevo León	Sierra Madre Oriental	2710 m 8,891 ft	1965 m 6,447 ft	54.9 km 34.1 mi	26.1196°N 100.5568°W
107	Cerro Las Conchas	Michoacán	Michoacán	2890 m 9,482 ft	1960 m 6,430 ft	103.3 km 64.2 mi	18.7215°N 102.9740°W
108	Renland High Point	Greenland	Island of Greenland	2200 m 7,218 ft	1950 m 6,398 ft	100.8 km 62.6 mi	71.3333°N 26.3333°W
109	Sacajawea Peak (Oregon) (Note: The summit of Sacajawea Peak (Oregon) is the highest point of the Wallowa Mountains and the Columbia Plateau.) (Note: The elevation of Sacajawea Peak (Oregon) includes an adjustment of +1.56 m (5.12 ft) from NGVD 29 to NAVD 88.)	Oregon	Wallowa Mountains	3000 m 9,843 ft	1949 m 6,393 ft	202 km 125.5 mi	45.2450°N 117.2929°W
110	Mount Priestley	British Columbia	Coast Mountains	2366 m 7,762 ft	1945 m 6,381 ft	50.4 km 31.3 mi	55.2297°N 128.8759°W
111	Angilaaq Mountain (Note: The summit of Angilaaq Mountain is the highest point of Bylot Island.)	Nunavut	Bylot Island	1944 m 6,378 ft	1944 m 6,378 ft	622 km 387 mi	73.2298°N 78.6230°W
112	Mount Neacola (Note: The summit of Mount Neacola is the highest point of the Neacola Mountains.)	Alaska	Aleutian Range	2873 m 9,426 ft	1943 m 6,376 ft	49.9 km 31 mi	60.7981°N 153.3959°W
113	Kings Peak (Note: The summit of Kings Peak is the highest point of the Uinta Mountains, the U.S. State of Utah, and the western Rocky Mountains.) (Note: The elevation of Kings Peak includes an adjustment of +1.807 m (5.93 ft) from NGVD 29 to NAVD 88.)	Utah	Uinta Mountains	4125 m 13,534 ft	1938 m 6,358 ft	268 km 166.6 mi	40.7763°N 110.3729°W
114	Mount Graham (Note: The summit of Mount Graham is the highest point of the Pinaleño Mountains.)	Arizona	Pinaleño Mountains	3268.6 m 10,724 ft	1932 m 6,340 ft	132.6 km 82.4 mi	32.7017°N 109.8714°W
115	Mount Douglas	Alaska	Alaska Peninsula	2149 m 7,050 ft	1920 m 6,300 ft	69 km 42.9 mi	58.8598°N 153.5353°W
115	Devon Ice Cap High Point (Note: The summit of Devon Ice Cap High Point is the highest point of Devon Island.)	Nunavut	Devon Island	1920 m 6,300 ft	1920 m 6,300 ft	265 km 164.6 mi	75.3429°N 82.6186°W
117	La Malintzin (La Malinche)	Puebla; Tlaxcala	Cordillera Neovolcanica	4430 m 14,534 ft	1920 m 6,299 ft	63.9 km 39.7 mi	19.2310°N 98.0321°W
117	Pico La Laguna (Note: The summit of Pico La Laguna is the highest point of Sierra San Lazaro and Estado Libre y Soberano de Baja California Sur.)	Baja California Sur	Sierra La Laguna	2090 m 6,857 ft	1920 m 6,299 ft	343 km 213 mi	23.5392°N 109.9542°W
119	Mount Goodsir (Note: The summit of Mount Goodsir is the highest point of the Ottertail Range.)	British Columbia	Canadian Rockies	3567 m 11,703 ft	1917 m 6,289 ft	64.1 km 39.8 mi	51.2021°N 116.3975°W
120	Sharks Teeth Peaks	British Columbia	Coast Mountains	2304 m 7,559 ft	1914 m 6,280 ft	21.9 km 13.6 mi	53.0071°N 127.2400°W
121	Detour Peak	British Columbia; Yukon	Saint Elias Mountains	2550 m 8,366 ft	1906 m 6,253 ft	21.2 km 13.16 mi	59.8424°N 137.5856°W
122	Sierra la Madera	Coahuila	Mexican Plateau	3030 m 9,941 ft	1905 m 6,250 ft	226 km 140.7 mi	27.0345°N 102.3922°W
123	Pyramiden (Note: The summit of Pyramiden is the highest point of Disko Island.)	Greenland	Disko Island	1904 m 6,247 ft	1904 m 6,247 ft	32.7 km 20.3 mi	70.1195°N 53.3890°W
124	Mount San Antonio (Note: The summit of Mount San Antonio is the highest point of the San Gabriel Mountains.) (Note: The elevation of Mount San Antonio includes an adjustment of +1.214 m (3.98 ft) from NGVD 29 to NAVD 88.)	California	San Gabriel Mountains	3069 m 10,068 ft	1903 m 6,244 ft	68.4 km 42.5 mi	34.2891°N 117.6463°W
125	Kichatna Spire	Alaska	Alaska Range	2739 m 8,985 ft	1900 m 6,235 ft	60 km 37.3 mi	62.4231°N 152.7231°W
126	De Long Peak (Peak 8084)	Alaska	Chugach Mountains	2464 m 8,084 ft	1900 m 6,234 ft	69.3 km 43.1 mi	60.8299°N 145.1335°W
127	Cerro la Joya	Querétaro	Sierra Madre Oriental	2950 m 9,678 ft	1900 m 6,234 ft	66.1 km 41.1 mi	21.4309°N 99.1326°W
127	Angelin Bjerg (Note: The summit of Angelin Bjerg is the highest point of Ymer Island.)	Greenland	Ymer Island	1900 m 6,234 ft	1900 m 6,234 ft	43.7 km 27.1 mi	73.1667°N 24.3167°W
129	Volcán Irazú	Costa Rica	Cordillera Central, Costa Rica	3432 m 11,260 ft	1897 m 6,224 ft	47.8 km 29.7 mi	9.9764°N 83.8534°W
130	Telescope Peak (Note: The summit of Telescope Peak is the highest point of the Panamint Range.)	California	Panamint Range	3366 m 11,043 ft	1886 m 6,188 ft	92 km 57.2 mi	36.1698°N 117.0892°W
131	Traill Island High Point	Greenland	Traill Island	1884 m 6,181 ft	1884 m 6,181 ft	50.8 km 31.6 mi	72.7167°N 24.0667°W
132	Mount Peale (Note: The summit of Mount Peale is the highest point of the La Sal Mountains and the Colorado Plateau.)	Utah	La Sal Mountains	3879 m 12,726 ft	1884 m 6,181 ft	117.1 km 72.8 mi	38.4385°N 109.2292°W
132	Pogromni Volcano	Alaska	Unimak Island	1991 m 6,531 ft	1884 m 6,181 ft	50.9 km 31.7 mi	54.5705°N 164.6926°W
134	Dewey Peak (Alaska) (Peak 8010)	Alaska	Chugach Mountains	2441 m 8,010 ft	1878 m 6,160 ft	40.7 km 25.3 mi	61.1605°N 144.8129°W
135	Alto Cuchumatanes	Guatemala	Huehuetenango	3837 m 12,589 ft	1877 m 6,158 ft	65.2 km 40.5 mi	15.5182°N 91.5445°W
136	Mount Washington (Note: The summit of Mount Washington is the highest point of the White Mountains, the State of New Hampshire, and the northeastern United States.)	New Hampshire	White Mountains	1917 m 6,288 ft	1877 m 6,158 ft	1,318.95	44.2705°N 71.3032°W
137	Cerro El Potosí (Note: The summit of Cerro El Potosí is the highest point of Estado Libre y Soberano de Nuevo León.)	Nuevo León	Sierra Madre Oriental	3720 m 12,205 ft	1875 m 6,152 ft	571 km 355 mi	24.8719°N 100.2327°W
138	Mount Igikpak (Note: The summit of Mount Igikpak is the highest point of the Schwatka Mountains.)	Alaska	Brooks Range	2523 m 8,276 ft	1867 m 6,126 ft	453 km 282 mi	67.4129°N 154.9656°W
139	Silvertip Mountain (Note: The summit of Silvertip Mountain is the highest point of the Hope Mountains.)	British Columbia	Cascade Range	2596 m 8,517 ft	1866 m 6,122 ft	19.55 km 12.15 mi	49.1633°N 121.2161°W
140	Snow Tower	Alaska	Coast Mountains	2003 m 6,572 ft	1866 m 6,122 ft	16.28 km 10.12 mi	58.1724°N 133.4009°W
141	Seven Sisters Peaks	British Columbia	Coast Mountains	2747 m 9,012 ft	1862 m 6,109 ft	68.8 km 42.7 mi	54.9678°N 128.2319°W
142	Montañas Peña Blanca	Guatemala	Sierra Madre de Chiapas	3518 m 11,542 ft	1858 m 6,096 ft	39.8 km 24.7 mi	15.4996°N 91.9151°W
143	Mount Mitchell (Note: The summit of Mount Mitchell is the highest point of the Appalachian Mountains, the State of North Carolina, and the eastern United States.)	North Carolina	Blue Ridge Mountains	2037 m 6,684 ft	1857 m 6,092 ft	1,913.49	35.7649°N 82.2651°W
144	Mount Saugstad	British Columbia	Coast Mountains	2908 m 9,541 ft	1850 m 6,070 ft	38.6 km 24 mi	52.2542°N 126.5148°W
145	Truuli Peak (Note: The summit of Truuli Peak is the highest point of the Kenai Mountains.)	Alaska	Kenai Mountains	2015 m 6,612 ft	1848 m 6,062 ft	141.3 km 87.8 mi	59.9129°N 150.4348°W
146	Victoria Peak	British Columbia	Vancouver Island	2159 m 7,083 ft	1845 m 6,053 ft	35.4 km 22 mi	50.0547°N 126.1008°W
147	Humphreys Peak (Note: The summit of Humphreys Peak is the highest point of the San Francisco Peaks and the U.S. State of Arizona.) (Note: The elevation of Humphreys Peak includes an adjustment of +1.345 m (4.41 ft) from NGVD 29 to NAVD 88.)	Arizona	San Francisco Peaks	3852 m 12,637 ft	1841 m 6,039 ft	396 km 246 mi	35.3464°N 111.6780°W
148	Volcán Acatenango	Guatemala	Chimaltenango	3975 m 13,041 ft	1835 m 6,020 ft	125.9 km 78.2 mi	14.5016°N 90.8755°W
149	Brian Boru Peak	British Columbia	Coast Mountains	2507 m 8,225 ft	1832 m 6,010 ft	32.8 km 20.4 mi	55.0739°N 127.5742°W
150	Volcán San Miguel	El Salvador	Sierra Madre de Chiapas	2131 m 6,991 ft	1831 m 6,007 ft	64.1 km 39.8 mi	13.4348°N 88.2691°W
151	Borah Peak (Note: The summit of Borah Peak is the highest point of the Lost River Range and the U.S. State of Idaho.)	Idaho	Lost River Range	3861.2 m 12,668 ft	1829 m 6,002 ft	243 km 150.8 mi	44.1374°N 113.7811°W
152	Howson Peak (Note: The summit of Howson Peak is the highest point of the Hazleton Mountains.)	British Columbia	Coast Mountains	2759 m 9,052 ft	1829 m 6,001 ft	254 km 158 mi	54.4185°N 127.7441°W
153	Atna Peak	British Columbia	Coast Mountains	2724 m 8,937 ft	1828 m 5,997 ft	56.8 km 35.3 mi	53.9398°N 128.0456°W
154	Tsaydaychuz Peak	British Columbia	Coast Mountains	2758 m 9,049 ft	1826 m 5,991 ft	82.8 km 51.4 mi	53.0212°N 126.6401°W
155	Mount Natazhat	Alaska	Saint Elias Mountains	4095 m 13,435 ft	1824 m 5,985 ft	24.9 km 15.49 mi	61.5217°N 141.1030°W
156	Parnaqussuit Qavaat High Point	Greenland	Island of Greenland	1860 m 6,102 ft	1820 m 5,971 ft	36.9 km 23 mi	66.4333°N 52.9167°W
157	Hanagita Peak	Alaska	Chugach Mountains	2592 m 8,504 ft	1815 m 5,954 ft	35.3 km 22 mi	61.0670°N 143.7075°W
158	Tanaga Volcano (Note: The summit of Tanaga Volcano is the highest point of Tanaga Island and the Andreanof Islands.)	Alaska	Tanaga Island	1806 m 5,925 ft	1806 m 5,925 ft	656 km 407 mi	51.8838°N 178.1429°W
159	Kootenay Mountain (Note: The summit of Kootenay Mountain is the highest point of the Nelson Range.)	British Columbia	Columbia Mountains	2456 m 8,058 ft	1801 m 5,909 ft	60 km 37.3 mi	49.2407°N 116.8226°W
160	Makushin Volcano (Note: The summit of Makushin Volcano is the highest point of Unalaska Island.)	Alaska	Unalaska Island	1800 m 5,905 ft	1800 m 5,905 ft	133.8 km 83.1 mi	53.8782°N 166.9299°W
161	Shedin Peak (Note: The summit of Shedin Peak is the highest point of the Skeena Mountains.)	British Columbia	Skeena Mountains	2588 m 8,491 ft	1798 m 5,899 ft	118.2 km 73.4 mi	55.9392°N 127.4799°W
162	Mount Martha Black	Yukon	Saint Elias Mountains	2512 m 8,241 ft	1797 m 5,896 ft	18.59 km 11.55 mi	60.6716°N 137.6224°W
163	Sovereign Mountain (Note: The summit of Sovereign Mountain is the highest point of the Talkeetna Mountains.)	Alaska	Talkeetna Mountains	2697 m 8,849 ft	1790 m 5,874 ft	73.5 km 45.6 mi	62.1311°N 148.6044°W
164	Mount Jefferson (Note: The summit of Mount Jefferson is the highest point of the Toquima Range.) (Note: The elevation of Mount Jefferson includes an adjustment of +1.666 m (5.47 ft) from NGVD 29 to NAVD 88.)	Nevada	Toquima Range	3641 m 11,946 ft	1789 m 5,871 ft	158.7 km 98.6 mi	38.7519°N 116.9267°W
165	Mount Ellen (Note: The summit of Mount Ellen is the highest point of the Henry Mountains.) (Note: The elevation of Mount Ellen includes an adjustment of +1.486 m (4.88 ft) from NGVD 29 to NAVD 88.)	Utah	Henry Mountains	3513 m 11,527 ft	1787 m 5,862 ft	90.2 km 56 mi	38.1089°N 110.8136°W
166	Isanotski Peaks	Alaska	Unimak Island	2471 m 8,106 ft	1785 m 5,856 ft	15.62 km 9.71 mi	54.7680°N 163.7291°W
167	Birkenhead Peak	British Columbia	Coast Mountains	2506 m 8,222 ft	1781 m 5,843 ft	10.14 km 6.3 mi	50.5112°N 122.6210°W
168	Loma Gajo en Medio	Dominican Republic	Island of Hispaniola	2279 m 7,477 ft	1779 m 5,837 ft	57.5 km 35.7 mi	18.6292°N 71.5108°W
169	Deseret Peak (Note: The summit of Deseret Peak is the highest point of the Stansbury Mountains.)	Utah	Stansbury Mountains	3364 m 11,035 ft	1772 m 5,812 ft	74 km 46 mi	40.4595°N 112.6264°W
170	Mount Harrison	British Columbia	Canadian Rockies	3360 m 11,024 ft	1770 m 5,807 ft	52.1 km 32.4 mi	50.0604°N 115.2057°W
170	Cerro Tacarcuna	Panama	Darién	1875 m 6,152 ft	1770 m 5,807 ft	174.4 km 108.3 mi	8.1659°N 77.2959°W
170	Storo High Point	Greenland	Island of Storo	1770 m 5,807 ft	1770 m 5,807 ft	32.6 km 20.3 mi	70.8333°N 27.4833°W
173	Mount Jefferson (Note: The elevation of Mount Jefferson includes an adjustment of +1.388 m (4.55 ft) from NGVD 29 to NAVD 88.)	Oregon	Cascade Range	3201 m 10,502 ft	1767 m 5,797 ft	77.5 km 48.1 mi	44.6743°N 121.7996°W
174	Snehaetten (Note: The summit of Snehaetten is the highest point of the Qeqertaq Island.)	Greenland	Qeqertaq Island	1765 m 5,791 ft	1765 m 5,791 ft	34.4 km 21.4 mi	71.6542°N 53.1641°W
175	Mount Edziza	British Columbia	Tahltan Highland	2793 m 9,163 ft	1763 m 5,784 ft	61.8 km 38.4 mi	57.7156°N 130.6345°W
176	Isthmus Peak	Alaska	Kenai Mountains	1991 m 6,532 ft	1762 m 5,782 ft	52 km 32.3 mi	60.5772°N 148.8915°W
177	Mount Sir Alexander	British Columbia	Canadian Rockies	3275 m 10,745 ft	1762 m 5,781 ft	87.8 km 54.5 mi	53.9360°N 120.3869°W
178	Mount Hector	Alberta	Canadian Rockies	3394 m 11,135 ft	1759 m 5,771 ft	21.5 km 13.34 mi	51.5752°N 116.2590°W
179	Chutine Peak	British Columbia	Coast Mountains	2903 m 9,524 ft	1758 m 5,768 ft	42.6 km 26.5 mi	57.7753°N 132.3346°W
180	Volcán Atitlán	Guatemala	Sierra Madre de Chiapas	3537 m 11,604 ft	1754 m 5,755 ft	33.2 km 20.6 mi	14.5834°N 91.1864°W
181	Frosty Peak	Alaska	Aleutian Range	1769 m 5,803 ft	1754 m 5,753 ft	56.9 km 35.4 mi	55.0672°N 162.8351°W
182	Whitehorn Mountain	British Columbia	Canadian Rockies	3399 m 11,152 ft	1747 m 5,732 ft	7.94 km 4.93 mi	53.1370°N 119.2667°W
183	Pilot Peak (Note: The summit of Pilot Peak is the highest point of the Pilot Range.)	Nevada	Pilot Range	3267.6 m 10,720 ft	1747 m 5,731 ft	86.4 km 53.7 mi	41.0211°N 114.0774°W
184	Mount Chown	Alberta	Canadian Rockies	3316 m 10,879 ft	1746 m 5,728 ft	30.7 km 19.05 mi	53.3971°N 119.4173°W
185	Peak 08-46	Nunavut	Ellesmere Island	2181 m 7,156 ft	1745 m 5,725 ft	35.1 km 21.8 mi	80.1370°N 76.7763°W
186	Crazy Peak (Note: The summit of Crazy Peak is the highest point of the Crazy Mountains.) (Note: The elevation of Crazy Peak includes an adjustment of +1.421 m (4.66 ft) from NGVD 29 to NAVD 88.)	Montana	Crazy Mountains	3418 m 11,214 ft	1743 m 5,719 ft	71.8 km 44.6 mi	46.0181°N 110.2768°W
187	Great Sitkin Volcano (Note: The summit of Great Sitkin Volcano is the highest point of Great Sitkin Island.)	Alaska	Great Sitkin Island	1740 m 5,710 ft	1740 m 5,710 ft	141.3 km 87.8 mi	52.0763°N 176.1108°W
188	Thudaka Peak (Note: The summit of Thudaka Peak is the highest point of Cassiar Mountains.)	British Columbia	Cassiar Mountains	2748 m 9,016 ft	1739 m 5,705 ft	103.5 km 64.3 mi	57.9272°N 126.8485°W
189	Azimuthbjerg (Note: The summit of Azimuthbjerg is the highest point of the island of Skjoldungen.)	Greenland	Island of Skjoldungen	1738 m 5,702 ft	1738 m 5,702 ft	140.5 km 87.3 mi	63.4552°N 41.8508°W
190	Svedenborg Bjerg (Note: The summit of Svedenborg Bjerg is the highest point of Geographical Society Island.)	Greenland	Geographical Society Island	1730 m 5,676 ft	1730 m 5,676 ft	24.9 km 15.48 mi	72.9436°N 24.3412°W
191	Mount Cleveland (Note: The summit of Mount Cleveland is the highest point of Chuginadak Island.)	Alaska	Chuginadak Island	1730 m 5,675 ft	1730 m 5,675 ft	90.6 km 56.3 mi	52.8230°N 169.9465°W
192	Qiajivik Mountain	Nunavut	Baffin Island	1905 m 6,250 ft	1729 m 5,673 ft	143.8 km 89.3 mi	72.1809°N 75.9090°W
193	Unuk Peak	British Columbia	Coast Mountains	2595 m 8,514 ft	1725 m 5,659 ft	13.79 km 8.57 mi	56.3764°N 130.1933°W
194	McDonald Peak (Note: The summit of McDonald Peak is the highest point of the Mission Range.) (Note: The elevation of McDonald Peak includes an adjustment of +1.318 m (4.32 ft) from NGVD 29 to NAVD 88.)	Montana	Mission Range	2994 m 9,824 ft	1722 m 5,650 ft	127.8 km 79.4 mi	47.3826°N 113.9191°W
195	Cond Peak (Note: The summit of Cond Peak is the highest point of the Kokanee Range.)	British Columbia	Columbia Mountains	2801 m 9,190 ft	1720 m 5,643 ft	35.3 km 21.9 mi	49.7462°N 117.1419°W
196	Appaalik (Note: The summit of Appaalik is the highest point of Appat Island.)	Greenland	Agpat Island	1711 m 5,614 ft	1711 m 5,614 ft	45.6 km 28.3 mi	70.9474°N 51.9918°W
197	Mount Wrangell	Alaska	Wrangell Mountains	4317 m 14,163 ft	1711 m 5,613 ft	23.8 km 14.79 mi	62.0059°N 144.0187°W
198	Pico Bonito	Honduras	Cordillera Nombre de Dios	2450 m 8,038 ft	1710 m 5,610 ft	151 km 93.8 mi	15.5575°N 86.8756°W
198	Sittakanay Peak (Bel Canto Peak)	British Columbia	Coast Mountains	2415 m 7,923 ft	1710 m 5,610 ft	38.9 km 24.1 mi	58.4786°N 133.3623°W
200	South Sister	Oregon	Cascade Range	3158.5 m 10,363 ft	1705 m 5,593 ft	63.4 km 39.4 mi	44.1035°N 121.7693°W
201	Devils Paw (Note: The summit of Devils Paw is the highest point of the Juneau Icefield.)	Alaska; British Columbia	Coast Mountains	2593 m 8,507 ft	1703 m 5,587 ft	136.3 km 84.7 mi	58.7289°N 133.8402°W
202	Montaña San Ildefonso	Honduras	Cortés	2242 m 7,356 ft	1702 m 5,584 ft	68.6 km 42.7 mi	15.5167°N 88.2333°W
203	Pukeashun Mountain	British Columbia	Columbia Mountains	2301 m 7,549 ft	1696 m 5,564 ft	56.4 km 35.1 mi	51.2046°N 119.2353°W
204	Mount Seattle	Alaska	Saint Elias Mountains	3155 m 10,350 ft	1695 m 5,561 ft	19.26 km 11.97 mi	60.0680°N 139.1893°W
204	Morton Peak	British Columbia	Columbia Mountains	2250 m 7,382 ft	1695 m 5,561 ft	30.5 km 18.94 mi	50.7653°N 118.8430°W
206	Thunder Mountain	British Columbia	Coast Mountains	2664 m 8,740 ft	1694 m 5,558 ft	27.6 km 17.14 mi	52.5531°N 126.3698°W
206	Hahn Land High Point (Note: The apex of Hahn Land is the easternmost ultra-prominent summit of Greenland and greater North America.)	Greenland	Island of Greenland	1744 m 5,722 ft	1694 m 5,558 ft	347 km 216 mi	80.4333°N 19.8333°W
208	Sierra Blanca Peak (Note: The summit of Sierra Blanca Peak is the highest point of the Sacramento Mountains.)	New Mexico	Sacramento Mountains	3651.8 m 11,981 ft	1693 m 5,553 ft	267 km 165.7 mi	33.3743°N 105.8087°W
209	Pikes Peak	Colorado	Front Range	4302.31 m 14,115 ft	1686 m 5,530 ft	97.6 km 60.6 mi	38.8405°N 105.0442°W
210	Mount Perseus	British Columbia	Quesnel Highland	2553 m 8,376 ft	1683 m 5,522 ft	24.9 km 15.48 mi	52.3541°N 120.5327°W
211	Mount Russell	Alaska	Alaska Range	3557 m 11,670 ft	1682 m 5,520 ft	22.7 km 14.07 mi	62.7984°N 151.8845°W
212	Overseer Mountain (Note: The summit of Overseer Mountain is the highest point of the Pemberton Icefield.)	British Columbia	Coast Mountains	2749 m 9,019 ft	1679 m 5,509 ft	19.39 km 12.05 mi	50.5288°N 123.3809°W
212	Farquhar Peak (Note: The summit of Farquhar Peak is the highest point of King Island.)	British Columbia	King Island	1679 m 5,509 ft	1679 m 5,509 ft	22.9 km 14.23 mi	52.3216°N 127.3065°W
214	Mount Nebo (Note: The summit of Mount Nebo is the highest point of the Wasatch Range.) (Note: The elevation of Mount Nebo includes an adjustment of +1.395 m (4.58 ft) from NGVD 29 to NAVD 88.)	Utah	Wasatch Range	3637 m 11,933 ft	1679 m 5,508 ft	121.6 km 75.6 mi	39.8219°N 111.7603°W
215	Mount Archibald	Yukon	Saint Elias Mountains	2588 m 8,491 ft	1678 m 5,505 ft	23.8 km 14.81 mi	60.7842°N 137.8736°W
216	Talchako Mountain	British Columbia	Coast Mountains	3037 m 9,964 ft	1676 m 5,499 ft	19.23 km 11.95 mi	52.0919°N 126.0159°W
217	Whiting Peak	British Columbia	Coast Mountains	2524 m 8,281 ft	1669 m 5,476 ft	53.9 km 33.5 mi	58.1389°N 132.9346°W
217	Faisal Peak	British Columbia	Coast Mountains	2239 m 7,346 ft	1669 m 5,476 ft	34 km 21.1 mi	56.8857°N 130.5798°W
217	Nuussuaq High Point (Note: The apex of the Nuussuaq Peninsula is the westernmost 2000-meter (6562-foot) summit in Greenland.)	Greenland	Island of Greenland	2144 m 7,034 ft	1669 m 5,476 ft	86.6 km 53.8 mi	70.6966°N 52.9728°W
220	North Pinnacle (Note: The summit of North Pinnacle is the highest point of the Whatshan Range.)	British Columbia	Columbia Mountains	2573 m 8,442 ft	1667 m 5,469 ft	31.8 km 19.74 mi	50.1953°N 118.2290°W
221	Volcán Tancítaro (Note: The summit of Volcán Tancítaro is the highest point of Estado Libre y Soberano de Michoacán de Ocampo.)	Michoacán	Cordillera Neovolcanica	3840 m 12,598 ft	1665 m 5,463 ft	136.3 km 84.7 mi	19.4166°N 102.3198°W
221	Volcán San Cristóbal	Nicaragua	Cordillera Los Maribios	1745 m 5,725 ft	1665 m 5,463 ft	134.5 km 83.6 mi	12.7026°N 87.0057°W
223	Mount Nirvana (Note: The summit of Mount Nirvana is the highest point of the Northwest Territories of Canada.)	Northwest Territories	Mackenzie Mountains	2773 m 9,098 ft	1663 m 5,456 ft	220 km 136.8 mi	61.8752°N 127.6807°W
224	Mount Thomlinson	British Columbia	Skeena Mountains	2451 m 8,041 ft	1661 m 5,449 ft	44 km 27.4 mi	55.5439°N 127.4864°W
225	Sillem Peak (Note: The summit of Sillem Peak is the highest point of Sillem Island.)	Nunavut	Sillem Island	1660 m 5,446 ft	1660 m 5,446 ft	23.8 km 14.77 mi	71.0018°N 71.8531°W
226	Lehua Mountain	British Columbia	Coast Mountains	2469 m 8,100 ft	1659 m 5,443 ft	40 km 24.9 mi	56.4910°N 130.7710°W
227	Mount Lester Jones	British Columbia	Coast Mountains	2408 m 7,900 ft	1658 m 5,440 ft	27.7 km 17.21 mi	58.7174°N 133.2306°W
227	Hardersbjerg	Greenland	Island of Greenland	1679 m 5,509 ft	1658 m 5,440 ft	56.2 km 34.9 mi	73.4333°N 22.8333°W
229	Snowshoe Peak (Note: The summit of Snowshoe Peak is the highest point of the Cabinet Mountains.) (Note: The elevation of Snowshoe Peak includes an adjustment of +1.367 m (4.48 ft) from NGVD 29 to NAVD 88.)	Montana	Cabinet Mountains	2665 m 8,743 ft	1658 m 5,438 ft	133.5 km 82.9 mi	48.2231°N 115.6890°W
230	Cerro El Centinela	Coahuila	Mexican Plateau	3122 m 10,243 ft	1657 m 5,436 ft	186.9 km 116.1 mi	25.1359°N 103.2304°W
230	Jeanette Peak	British Columbia	Canadian Rockies	3089 m 10,135 ft	1657 m 5,436 ft	17.54 km 10.9 mi	52.6357°N 118.6166°W
232	Mount Porsild	Yukon	Coast Mountains	2545 m 8,350 ft	1655 m 5,430 ft	82 km 51 mi	60.0840°N 136.0154°W
233	Sharktooth Mountain	British Columbia	Cassiar Mountains	2668 m 8,753 ft	1653 m 5,423 ft	98.4 km 61.2 mi	58.5876°N 127.9625°W
234	Picacho San Onofre (Sierra Peña Nevada)	Nuevo León	Sierra Madre Oriental	3550 m 11,647 ft	1650 m 5,413 ft	125 km 77.6 mi	23.8007°N 99.8464°W
234	El Aguacate Oeste	Oaxaca	Sierra Madre del Sur	2830 m 9,285 ft	1650 m 5,413 ft	57.3 km 35.6 mi	16.5812°N 95.8035°W
234	Ukpik Peak	Nunavut	Baffin Island	1809 m 5,935 ft	1650 m 5,413 ft	17.28 km 10.74 mi	70.6882°N 71.3232°W
237	North Schell Peak (Note: The summit of North Schell Peak is the highest point of the Schell Creek Range.)	Nevada	Schell Creek Range	3625.6 m 11,895 ft	1650 m 5,413 ft	37.9 km 23.5 mi	39.4132°N 114.5997°W
238	Hayford Peak (Note: The summit of Hayford Peak is the highest point of the Sheep Range.)	Nevada	Sheep Range	3024.9 m 9,924 ft	1650 m 5,412 ft	54.3 km 33.8 mi	36.6577°N 115.2008°W
239	Mount Forbes (Note: The summit of Mount Forbes is the highest point of the entire Hudson Bay drainage basin.)	Alberta	Canadian Rockies	3617 m 11,867 ft	1649 m 5,410 ft	47.4 km 29.5 mi	51.8600°N 116.9316°W
240	Mount Foresta	Alaska	Saint Elias Mountains	3368 m 11,050 ft	1646 m 5,400 ft	20.1 km 12.51 mi	60.1912°N 139.4323°W
240	Star Peak (Note: The summit of Star Peak is the highest point of the Humboldt Range.)	Nevada	Humboldt Range	2999.1 m 9,840 ft	1646 m 5,400 ft	111.1 km 69 mi	40.5224°N 118.1708°W
242	Upper Saddle Mountain	British Columbia	Columbia Mountains	2330 m 7,644 ft	1645 m 5,397 ft	23.6 km 14.68 mi	50.1726°N 117.9000°W
243	Veniaminof Peak (Note: The summit of Veniaminof Peak is the highest point of Baranof Island.)	Alaska	Baranof Island	1643 m 5,390 ft	1643 m 5,390 ft	128.3 km 79.7 mi	57.0151°N 134.9882°W
244	Diamond Peak (Note: The summit of Diamond Peak is the highest point of the Lemhi Range.)	Idaho	Lemhi Range	3719.3 m 12,202 ft	1642 m 5,387 ft	51.2 km 31.8 mi	44.1414°N 113.0827°W
245	Flat Top Mountain (Note: The summit of Flat Top Mountain is the highest point of the Oquirrh Mountains.) (Note: The elevation of Flat Top Mountain includes an adjustment of +1.329 m (4.36 ft) from NGVD 29 to NAVD 88.)	Utah	Oquirrh Mountains	3238 m 10,624 ft	1641 m 5,383 ft	38.4 km 23.8 mi	40.3724°N 112.1888°W
246	Hubris Peak	British Columbia	Coast Mountains	2445 m 8,022 ft	1640 m 5,381 ft	51.9 km 32.2 mi	56.5518°N 130.9733°W
247	Tupeq Mountain	Nunavut	Baffin Island	2020 m 6,627 ft	1638 m 5,374 ft	14.21 km 8.83 mi	66.5737°N 65.0717°W
248	Bearhole Peak (Note: The summit of Bearhole Peak is the highest point of the Granite Range.)	Alaska	Saint Elias Mountains	2596 m 8,517 ft	1636 m 5,367 ft	15.62 km 9.71 mi	60.9283°N 142.5237°W
249	Mount Steller (Note: The summit of Mount Steller is the highest point of Waxell Ridge.)	Alaska	Chugach Mountains	3205 m 10,515 ft	1635 m 5,365 ft	36.2 km 22.5 mi	60.5199°N 143.0932°W
250	Klosterbjerge	Greenland	Island of Greenland	2410 m 7,907 ft	1635 m 5,364 ft	38.8 km 24.1 mi	72.2500°N 25.9500°W
251	Qingagssat Qaqit	Greenland	Island of Greenland	1782 m 5,846 ft	1632 m 5,354 ft	23.3 km 14.47 mi	60.5654°N 44.6949°W
252	Mount Stuart (Note: The summit of Mount Stuart is the highest point of the Wenatchee Mountains.) (Note: The elevation of Mount Stuart includes an adjustment of +1.388 m (4.55 ft) from NGVD 29 to NAVD 88.)	Washington	Wenatchee Mountains	2871 m 9,420 ft	1632 m 5,354 ft	71.6 km 44.5 mi	47.4751°N 120.9024°W
253	Mount Judge Howay	British Columbia	Coast Mountains	2262 m 7,421 ft	1627 m 5,338 ft	35.7 km 22.2 mi	49.5072°N 122.3218°W
254	Volcán Las Tres Vírgenes	Baja California Sur	Tres Virgenes	1951 m 6,401 ft	1626 m 5,335 ft	340 km 211 mi	27.4700°N 112.5919°W
255	Ejnar Mikkelsen Fjeld	Greenland	Island of Greenland	3325 m 10,909 ft	1625 m 5,331 ft	16.29 km 10.12 mi	68.8957°N 28.6279°W
256	Blanca Peak (Note: The summit of Blanca Peak is the highest point of the Sangre de Cristo Mountains and the entire Rio Grande drainage basin.)	Colorado	Sangre de Cristo Mountains	4374 m 14,351 ft	1623 m 5,326 ft	166.4 km 103.4 mi	37.5775°N 105.4856°W
257	Sierra de Santa Martha	Veracruz	Cordillera Neovolcanica	1690 m 5,545 ft	1620 m 5,315 ft	180.1 km 111.9 mi	18.3455°N 94.8576°W
258	Mount Pattullo	British Columbia	Coast Mountains	2727 m 8,947 ft	1617 m 5,305 ft	23.1 km 14.37 mi	56.2339°N 129.6576°W
258	Touak Peak (Peak 1840)	Nunavut	Baffin Island	1840 m 6,037 ft	1617 m 5,305 ft	84.9 km 52.8 mi	66.1519°N 63.4918°W
260	Mount Miller (Note: The summit of Mount Miller is the highest point of Barkley Ridge.)	Alaska	Chugach Mountains	3277 m 10,750 ft	1615 m 5,300 ft	64.9 km 40.3 mi	60.4605°N 142.3012°W
261	Agssaussat	Greenland	Island of Greenland	2140 m 7,021 ft	1615 m 5,299 ft	18.06 km 11.22 mi	65.8833°N 52.1167°W
262	Mount Tatlow	British Columbia	Coast Mountains	3063 m 10,049 ft	1613 m 5,292 ft	34.4 km 21.4 mi	51.3843°N 123.8641°W
262	Kloftbjerge	Greenland	Island of Greenland	2163 m 7,096 ft	1613 m 5,292 ft	92.3 km 57.4 mi	71.3333°N 25.7500°W
264	Carlisle Volcano (Note: The summit of Carlisle Volcano is the highest point of Carlisle Island.)	Alaska	Carlisle Island	1610 m 5,283 ft	1610 m 5,283 ft	10.68 km 6.64 mi	52.8913°N 170.0580°W
265	Salliaruseq High Point	Greenland	Salliaruseq Island	1610 m 5,282 ft	1610 m 5,282 ft	29.5 km 18.32 mi	64.3913°N 51.1134°W
266	Mount Timpanogos (Note: The summit of Mount Timpanogos is the highest point of the central Wasatch Range.)	Utah	Wasatch Range	3582 m 11,752 ft	1609 m 5,279 ft	63.8 km 39.6 mi	40.3908°N 111.6459°W
267	Hudson Bay Mountain	British Columbia	Coast Mountains	2589 m 8,494 ft	1609 m 5,279 ft	51 km 31.7 mi	54.8116°N 127.3396°W
267	Corsan Peak	British Columbia	Coast Mountains	1934 m 6,345 ft	1609 m 5,279 ft	28.4 km 17.64 mi	51.0175°N 126.4058°W
269	Mount Fryatt (Note: The summit of Mount Fryatt is the highest point of the Hooker Icefield.)	Alberta	Canadian Rockies	3361 m 11,027 ft	1608 m 5,276 ft	16.37 km 10.17 mi	52.5503°N 117.9104°W
270	Bashful Peak (Note: The summit of Bashful Peak is the highest point of the western Chugach Mountains.)	Alaska	Chugach Mountains	2440 m 8,005 ft	1608 m 5,275 ft	35.5 km 22.1 mi	61.3076°N 148.8697°W
271	Basement Peak	British Columbia	Saint Elias Mountains	2706 m 8,878 ft	1606 m 5,269 ft	23.6 km 14.66 mi	59.3551°N 137.1614°W
272	Ibapah Peak (Note: The summit of Ibapah Peak is the highest point of the Deep Creek Range.) (Note: The elevation of Ibapah Peak includes an adjustment of +1.517 m (4.98 ft) from NGVD 29 to NAVD 88.)	Utah	Deep Creek Range	3686 m 12,092 ft	1605 m 5,267 ft	98.5 km 61.2 mi	39.8282°N 113.9200°W
273	Kisimngiuqtuq Peak	Nunavut	Baffin Island	1905 m 6,250 ft	1605 m 5,266 ft	362 km 225 mi	70.7993°N 71.6502°W
274	Clavering Island High Point	Greenland	Clavering Island	1604 m 5,262 ft	1604 m 5,262 ft	77.1 km 47.9 mi	74.3667°N 21.1833°W
275	Monmouth Mountain (Note: The summit of Monmouth Mountain is the highest point of the Lillooet Icefield.) (Mount Monmouth)	British Columbia	Coast Mountains	3182 m 10,440 ft	1602 m 5,256 ft	31.6 km 19.6 mi	50.9924°N 123.7900°W
275	Volcán de Santa Ana	El Salvador	Sierra Madre de Chiapas	2362 m 7,749 ft	1602 m 5,256 ft	69.1 km 42.9 mi	13.8557°N 89.6288°W
277	Mount Ovington	British Columbia	Hart Ranges	2949 m 9,675 ft	1600 m 5,249 ft	18.75 km 11.65 mi	54.1433°N 120.5740°W
278	Mount Cleveland (Note: The summit of Mount Cleveland is the highest point of the Lewis Range.)	Montana	Lewis Range	3194 m 10,479 ft	1599 m 5,246 ft	159.9 km 99.4 mi	48.9249°N 113.8482°W
279	She Devil (mountain) (Note: The summit of She Devil (mountain) is the highest point of the Seven Devils Mountains.) (Note: The elevation of She Devil (mountain) includes an adjustment of +1.365 m (4.48 ft) from NGVD 29 to NAVD 88.)	Idaho	Seven Devils Mountains	2873 m 9,424 ft	1597 m 5,240 ft	50.6 km 31.5 mi	45.3240°N 116.5406°W
279	Tetlin Peak	Alaska	Alaska Range	2550 m 8,365 ft	1597 m 5,240 ft	41.1 km 25.5 mi	62.6215°N 143.1084°W
281	Schweizerland High Point	Greenland	Island of Greenland	1671 m 5,482 ft	1596 m 5,236 ft	95.4 km 59.3 mi	66.1203°N 37.4420°W
282	Arc Dome (Note: The summit of Arc Dome is the highest point of the Toiyabe Range.) (Note: The elevation of Arc Dome includes an adjustment of +1.665 m (5.46 ft) from NGVD 29 to NAVD 88.)	Nevada	Toiyabe Range	3590 m 11,778 ft	1595 m 5,233 ft	37.2 km 23.1 mi	38.8327°N 117.3531°W
283	Lassen Peak	California	Cascade Range	3188.7 m 10,462 ft	1594 m 5,229 ft	114.9 km 71.4 mi	40.4882°N 121.5050°W
284	Mount Addenbroke (Note: The summit of Mount Addenbroke is the highest point of East Redonda Island and the Inside Passage Islands.)	British Columbia	East Redonda Island	1591 m 5,220 ft	1591 m 5,220 ft	13.09 km 8.13 mi	50.2316°N 124.6861°W
285	Cerro las Capillas	Jalisco	Jalisco	2890 m 9,482 ft	1590 m 5,217 ft	55.8 km 34.7 mi	19.5552°N 104.1472°W
286	Estero Peak	British Columbia	Coast Mountains	1664 m 5,459 ft	1589 m 5,213 ft	12.57 km 7.81 mi	50.4620°N 125.1860°W
287	Margaretatopp	Greenland	Island of Greenland	2360 m 7,743 ft	1585 m 5,200 ft	69 km 42.9 mi	73.3667°N 26.3000°W
287	Paatuut	Greenland	Island of Greenland	2010 m 6,594 ft	1585 m 5,200 ft	45.8 km 28.4 mi	70.2966°N 52.7017°W
287	Agdleruussakasit	Greenland	Island of Greenland	1763 m 5,784 ft	1585 m 5,200 ft	5.75 km 3.57 mi	60.1364°N 44.5293°W
290	Mount Deborah	Alaska	Alaska Range	3761 m 12,339 ft	1582 m 5,189 ft	25.9 km 16.08 mi	63.6377°N 147.2384°W
291	Mont Forel	Greenland	Island of Greenland	3391 m 11,125 ft	1581 m 5,187 ft	357 km 222 mi	66.9354°N 36.7873°W
292	Necons Peak (Peak 8336)	Alaska	Alaska Range	2541 m 8,336 ft	1581 m 5,186 ft	35.3 km 21.9 mi	61.1125°N 153.4690°W
293	Cerro Zempoaltépetl	Oaxaca	Sierra Madre del Sur	3420 m 11,220 ft	1580 m 5,184 ft	103.2 km 64.1 mi	17.1324°N 96.0125°W
293	Mount Seton (Note: The summit of Mount Seton is the highest point of the Cayoosh Range.) (Goat Mountain)	British Columbia	Coast Mountains	2855 m 9,367 ft	1580 m 5,184 ft	20.4 km 12.64 mi	50.6237°N 122.2600°W
295	Volcán Concepción	Nicaragua	Rivas	1610 m 5,282 ft	1579 m 5,180 ft	69.6 km 43.3 mi	11.5380°N 85.6226°W
296	Abercrombie Mountain (Note: The elevation of Abercrombie Mountain includes an adjustment of +1.345 m (4.41 ft) from NGVD 29 to NAVD 88.)	Washington	Columbia Mountains	2229 m 7,312 ft	1578 m 5,178 ft	22.6 km 14.04 mi	48.9284°N 117.4600°W
297	Pico Pijol	Honduras	Yoro	2320 m 7,612 ft	1578 m 5,177 ft	65.1 km 40.4 mi	15.1833°N 87.5667°W
298	Mount Lemmon (Note: The summit of Mount Lemmon is the highest point of the Santa Catalina Mountains.) (Note: The elevation of Mount Lemmon includes an adjustment of +1.004 m (3.29 ft) from NGVD 29 to NAVD 88.)	Arizona	Santa Catalina Mountains	2792 m 9,160 ft	1578 m 5,177 ft	82.9 km 51.5 mi	32.4430°N 110.7885°W
299	Blaskbjerg	Greenland	Island of Greenland	1600 m 5,249 ft	1575 m 5,167 ft	17.46 km 10.85 mi	73.3000°N 24.0333°W
300	Kaza Mountain	British Columbia	Columbia Mountains	2543 m 8,343 ft	1573 m 5,161 ft	35.5 km 22 mi	53.0711°N 121.0089°W
301	Gareloi Volcano (Note: The summit of Gareloi Volcano is the highest point of Gareloi Island.) (Note: Gareloi Volcano is the westernmost ultra-prominent summit of Alaska, the United States, and greater North America.)	Alaska	Gareloi Island	1573 m 5,160 ft	1573 m 5,160 ft	46.1 km 28.6 mi	51.7880°N 178.7940°W
302	Mount Cronin	British Columbia	Skeena Mountains	2396 m 7,861 ft	1571 m 5,154 ft	33.3 km 20.7 mi	54.9301°N 126.8638°W
302	Rugged Mountain	British Columbia	Vancouver Island	1861 m 6,106 ft	1571 m 5,154 ft	35.1 km 21.8 mi	50.0252°N 126.6778°W
304	Chiricahua Peak (Note: The summit of Chiricahua Peak is the highest point of the Chiricahua Mountains.) (Note: The elevation of Chiricahua Peak includes an adjustment of +1.173 m (3.85 ft) from NGVD 29 to NAVD 88.)	Arizona	Chiricahua Mountains	2976 m 9,763 ft	1569 m 5,149 ft	103.3 km 64.2 mi	31.8456°N 109.2910°W
305	Stony Peak (Peak 8488)	Alaska	Alaska Range	2587 m 8,488 ft	1566 m 5,138 ft	19.19 km 11.92 mi	61.4950°N 153.6224°W
306	McBeth-Inugsuin Peak (Peak 39-18)	Nunavut	Baffin Island	1721 m 5,646 ft	1564 m 5,131 ft	138.5 km 86.1 mi	69.6524°N 69.3059°W
307	Mount Eddy (Note: The summit of Mount Eddy is the highest point of the Klamath Mountains.)	California	Klamath Mountains	2754.6 m 9,037 ft	1562 m 5,125 ft	23.5 km 14.58 mi	41.3196°N 122.4790°W
308	Volcán de San Vicente	El Salvador	Sierra Madre de Chiapas	2182 m 7,159 ft	1562 m 5,125 ft	90.3 km 56.1 mi	13.5965°N 88.8376°W
309	Kispiox Mountain	British Columbia	Skeena Mountains	2096 m 6,877 ft	1561 m 5,121 ft	33.1 km 20.6 mi	55.3985°N 127.9435°W
310	Iztaccíhuatl	México; Puebla	Cordillera Neovolcanica	5230 m 17,159 ft	1560 m 5,118 ft	17.51 km 10.88 mi	19.1802°N 98.6415°W
311	Mount Sylvia	British Columbia	Muskwa Ranges	2940 m 9,646 ft	1559 m 5,115 ft	73.8 km 45.9 mi	58.0820°N 124.4688°W
311	Eglinton-Sam Ford Peak (Peak 35-44)	Nunavut	Baffin Island	1562 m 5,125 ft	1559 m 5,115 ft	25.1 km 15.61 mi	70.5800°N 70.7283°W
313	Mount Wotzke (Note: The summit of Mount Wotzke is the highest point of the Quesnel Highland.)	British Columbia	Quesnel Highland	2597 m 8,520 ft	1556 m 5,105 ft	26.1 km 16.19 mi	52.7131°N 120.6507°W
314	Mount Macdonald (Note: The summit of Mount Macdonald is the highest point of the Bonnet Plume Mountains.)	Yukon	Mackenzie Mountains	2760 m 9,055 ft	1555 m 5,102 ft	187.5 km 116.5 mi	64.7256°N 132.7781°W
314	Kinaussak	Greenland	Island of Greenland	1630 m 5,348 ft	1555 m 5,102 ft	88.3 km 54.9 mi	64.4500°N 50.5167°W
316	Mount Crysdale	British Columbia	Misinchinka Ranges	2429 m 7,969 ft	1554 m 5,098 ft	147.3 km 91.5 mi	55.9383°N 123.4210°W
317	Vile Peak	British Columbia	Skeena Mountains	2189 m 7,182 ft	1551 m 5,089 ft	46.5 km 28.9 mi	56.2711°N 128.3401°W
318	Gaaseland High Point	Greenland	Island of Greenland	2100 m 6,890 ft	1550 m 5,085 ft	135.6 km 84.3 mi	70.2000°N 27.6667°W
319	Mount Augusta	Alaska; Yukon	Saint Elias Mountains	4289 m 14,070 ft	1549 m 5,082 ft	23.2 km 14.41 mi	60.3074°N 140.4584°W
319	Dalton Peak	Yukon	Saint Elias Mountains	2329 m 7,641 ft	1549 m 5,082 ft	32.9 km 20.4 mi	60.4767°N 137.1728°W
319	Sangmissoq High Point	Greenland	Island of Sangmissoq	1549 m 5,082 ft	1549 m 5,082 ft	35.5 km 22.1 mi	60.0502°N 43.9164°W
322	Favres Bjerg	Greenland	Island of Greenland	2000 m 6,562 ft	1546 m 5,072 ft	117.1 km 72.8 mi	73.9500°N 23.2000°W
323	Copper Peak (Peak 6915)	Alaska	Chugach Mountains	2108 m 6,915 ft	1544 m 5,065 ft	17.87 km 11.1 mi	61.3297°N 144.9599°W
324	Mount Bear	Alaska	Saint Elias Mountains	4520 m 14,831 ft	1540 m 5,054 ft	32.4 km 20.1 mi	61.2834°N 141.1433°W
325	Johnstrup Bjerge	Greenland	Island of Greenland	2000 m 6,562 ft	1540 m 5,052 ft	30.9 km 19.21 mi	73.0000°N 25.5333°W
326	Berzelius Bjerg	Greenland	Island of Greenland	1810 m 5,938 ft	1535 m 5,036 ft	38.5 km 23.9 mi	72.4667°N 25.0667°W
327	Korovin Volcano (Note: The summit of Korovin Volcano is the highest point of Atka Island.)	Alaska	Atka Island	1533 m 5,030 ft	1533 m 5,030 ft	137.2 km 85.2 mi	52.3816°N 174.1653°W
328	Whitecap Mountain (Note: The summit of Whitecap Mountain is the highest point of the Bendor Range.)	British Columbia	Coast Mountains	2918 m 9,573 ft	1533 m 5,030 ft	71.4 km 44.4 mi	50.7162°N 122.5085°W
329	Dunn Peak (Note: The summit of Dunn Peak is the highest point of the Shuswap Highland.)	British Columbia	Columbia Mountains	2636 m 8,648 ft	1531 m 5,023 ft	87.1 km 54.1 mi	51.4372°N 119.9546°W
330	Mount Temple (Note: The summit of Mount Temple is the highest point of the Bow Range.)	Alberta	Canadian Rockies	3540 m 11,614 ft	1530 m 5,020 ft	21.3 km 13.22 mi	51.3511°N 116.2063°W
330	Mount Ida	British Columbia	Canadian Rockies	3200 m 10,499 ft	1530 m 5,020 ft	14.14 km 8.79 mi	54.0580°N 120.3268°W
330	Volcán de Tequila	Jalisco	Jalisco	2930 m 9,613 ft	1530 m 5,020 ft	63.4 km 39.4 mi	20.7872°N 103.8468°W
330	Cerro El Pital	El Salvador; Honduras	Sierra de las Nubes	2730 m 8,957 ft	1530 m 5,020 ft	51.1 km 31.8 mi	14.3844°N 89.1292°W
334	Mount Monkley	British Columbia	Coast Mountains	1967 m 6,453 ft	1529 m 5,016 ft	29.3 km 18.23 mi	54.8914°N 129.6477°W
335	Volcán Miravalles	Costa Rica	Cordillera de Guanacaste	2028 m 6,654 ft	1528 m 5,013 ft	99.4 km 61.8 mi	10.7469°N 85.1505°W
336	Miller Peak (Note: The summit of Miller Peak is the highest point of the Huachuca Mountains.) (Note: The elevation of Miller Peak includes an adjustment of +1.067 m (3.5 ft) from NGVD 29 to NAVD 88.)	Arizona	Huachuca Mountains	2886 m 9,470 ft	1527 m 5,011 ft	107 km 66.5 mi	31.3928°N 110.2930°W
337	The Horn	British Columbia	Coast Mountains	2907 m 9,537 ft	1527 m 5,010 ft	20.3 km 12.63 mi	52.3190°N 126.2363°W
338	Pass Mountain (Note: The summit of Pass Mountain is the highest point of the Wernecke Mountains.)	Yukon	Mackenzie Mountains	2515 m 8,250 ft	1524 m 5,000 ft	46.9 km 29.1 mi	64.5140°N 133.6254°W
339	Mount Tod	British Columbia	Thompson Plateau	2155 m 7,070 ft	1523 m 4,997 ft	57.9 km 36 mi	50.9166°N 119.9407°W
340	Grey Hunter Peak	Yukon	North Yukon Plateau	2214 m 7,264 ft	1519 m 4,984 ft	178.7 km 111 mi	63.1357°N 135.6359°W
341	Gataga Peak	British Columbia	Muskwa Ranges	2533 m 8,310 ft	1515 m 4,970 ft	35.3 km 21.9 mi	58.0697°N 125.7010°W
342	Ambition Mountain	British Columbia	Coast Mountains	2953 m 9,688 ft	1513 m 4,964 ft	25.7 km 15.95 mi	57.3949°N 131.4851°W
343	Loma Alto de la Bandera	Dominican Republic	Island of Hispaniola	2842 m 9,324 ft	1512 m 4,961 ft	43.4 km 27 mi	18.8126°N 70.6268°W
344	Cerro Atravesado (Sierra el Cerro Azul)	Oaxaca	Oaxaca	2310 m 7,579 ft	1510 m 4,954 ft	109.6 km 68.1 mi	16.7652°N 94.4514°W
344	Sierra del Fraile	Nuevo León	Sierra Madre Oriental	2310 m 7,579 ft	1510 m 4,954 ft	26.2 km 16.26 mi	25.8645°N 100.6095°W
344	Angna Mountain	Nunavut	Baffin Island	1710 m 5,610 ft	1510 m 4,954 ft	73.7 km 45.8 mi	66.5595°N 62.0273°W
347	Hkusam Mountain	British Columbia	Vancouver Island	1645 m 5,397 ft	1508 m 4,948 ft	34.2 km 21.3 mi	50.3349°N 125.8407°W
348	Montaña los Comayagua	Honduras	Comayagua	2407 m 7,897 ft	1507 m 4,944 ft	80.1 km 49.7 mi	14.5000°N 87.5000°W
349	Mount Joffre	Alberta; British Columbia	Canadian Rockies	3433 m 11,263 ft	1505 m 4,938 ft	49.2 km 30.6 mi	50.5285°N 115.2069°W
349	Sierra de Agalta High Point	Honduras	Sierra de Agalta	2335 m 7,661 ft	1505 m 4,938 ft	122.6 km 76.1 mi	14.9576°N 85.9165°W
349	Kitlope Peak	British Columbia	Coast Mountains	1950 m 6,398 ft	1505 m 4,938 ft	15.97 km 9.92 mi	53.0381°N 127.6414°W
352	Robertson Peak	British Columbia	Coast Mountains	2252 m 7,388 ft	1502 m 4,928 ft	16.29 km 10.12 mi	49.6460°N 122.2502°W
352	Mount Van der Est	British Columbia	Coast Mountains	1801 m 5,909 ft	1502 m 4,928 ft	35.4 km 22 mi	50.5565°N 125.2832°W

== By region ==
=== Greenland ===
The 38 mountain peaks of Greenland with at least 1500 meters of topographic prominence
Rank	Mountain Peak	Mountain Range	Elevation	Prominence	Isolation	Location
1	Gunnbjørn Fjeld	Island of Greenland	3694 m 12,119 ft	3694 m 12,119 ft	3,254.13	68.9184°N; 29.8991°W
2	Stauning Alper	Island of Greenland	2831 m 9,288 ft	2181 m 7,156 ft	164.9 km 102.5 mi	72.1167°N; 24.9000°W
3	Palup Qaqa high point	Upernivik Island	2105 m 6,906 ft	2105 m 6,906 ft	31.2 km 19.4 mi	71.3333°N; 52.8167°W
4	Milne Land high point	Island of Milne Land	2050 m 6,726 ft	2050 m 6,726 ft	58.1 km 36.1 mi	70.8194°N; 26.5956°W
5	Payers Tinde	Island of Greenland	2320 m 7,612 ft	2045 m 6,709 ft	26.1 km 16.24 mi	73.1333°N; 26.3667°W
6	Perserajoq	Island of Greenland	2259 m 7,411 ft	2009 m 6,591 ft	527 km 328 mi	71.4000°N; 51.9667°W
7	Renland high point	Island of Greenland	2200 m 7,218 ft	1950 m 6,398 ft	100.8 km 62.6 mi	71.3333°N; 26.3333°W
8	Pyramiden	Disko Island	1904 m 6,247 ft	1904 m 6,247 ft	32.7 km 20.3 mi	70.1195°N; 53.3890°W
9	Angelin Bjerg	Ymer Island	1900 m 6,234 ft	1900 m 6,234 ft	43.7 km 27.1 mi	73.1667°N; 24.3167°W
10	Traill Island high point	Traill Island	1884 m 6,181 ft	1884 m 6,181 ft	50.8 km 31.6 mi	72.7167°N; 24.0667°W
11	Parnaqussuit Qavaat high point	Island of Greenland	1860 m 6,102 ft	1820 m 5,971 ft	36.9 km 23 mi	66.4333°N; 52.9167°W
12	Storo high point	Island of Storo	1770 m 5,807 ft	1770 m 5,807 ft	32.6 km 20.3 mi	70.8333°N; 27.4833°W|
13	Snehaetten	Qeqertaq Island	1765 m 5,791 ft	1765 m 5,791 ft	34.4 km 21.4 mi	71.6542°N; 53.1641°W
14	Azimuthbjerg	Island of Skjoldungen	1738 m 5,702 ft	1738 m 5,702 ft	140.5 km 87.3 mi	63.4552°N; 41.8508°W
15	Svedenborg Bjerg	Geographical Society Island	1730 m 5,676 ft	1730 m 5,676 ft	24.9 km 15.48 mi	72.9436°N; 24.3412°W
16	Appaalik	Appat Island	1711 m 5,614 ft	1711 m 5,614 ft	45.6 km 28.3 mi	70.9474°N; 51.9918°W
17	Hahn Land high point	Island of Greenland	1744 m 5,722 ft	1694 m 5,558 ft	347 km 216 mi	80.4333°N; 19.8333°W
18	Nuussuaq high point	Island of Greenland	2144 m 7,034 ft	1669 m 5,476 ft	86.6 km 53.8 mi	70.6966°N; 52.9728°W
19	Hardersbjerg	Island of Greenland	1679 m 5,509 ft	1658 m 5,440 ft	56.2 km 34.9 mi	73.4333°N; 22.8333°W
20	Klosterbjerge	Island of Greenland	2410 m 7,907 ft	1635 m 5,364 ft	38.8 km 24.1 mi	72.2500°N; 25.9500°W
21	Qingagssat Qaqit	Island of Greenland	1782 m 5,846 ft	1632 m 5,354 ft	23.3 km 14.47 mi	60.5654°N; 44.6949°W
22	Ejnar Mikkelsen Fjeld	Island of Greenland	3325 m 10,909 ft	1625 m 5,331 ft	16.29 km 10.12 mi	68.8957°N; 28.6279°W
23	Agssaussat	Island of Greenland	2140 m 7,021 ft	1615 m 5,299 ft	18.06 km 11.22 mi	65.8833°N; 52.1167°W
24	Kloftbjerge	Island of Greenland	2163 m 7,096 ft	1613 m 5,292 ft	92.3 km 57.4 mi	71.3333°N; 25.7500°W
25	Salliaruseq high point	Salliaruseq Island	1610 m 5,282 ft	1610 m 5,282 ft	29.5 km 18.32 mi	64.3913°N; 51.1134°W
26	Clavering Island high point	Clavering Island	1604 m 5,262 ft	1604 m 5,262 ft	77.1 km 47.9 mi	74.3667°N; 21.1833°W
27	Schweizerland high point	Island of Greenland	1671 m 5,482 ft	1596 m 5,236 ft	95.4 km 59.3 mi	66.1203°N; 37.4420°W
28	Margaretatopp	Island of Greenland	2360 m 7,743 ft	1585 m 5,200 ft	69 km 42.9 mi	73.3667°N; 26.3000°W
28	Paatuut	Island of Greenland	2010 m 6,594 ft	1585 m 5,200 ft	45.8 km 28.4 mi	70.2966°N; 52.7017°W
28	Agdleruussakasit	Island of Greenland	1763 m 5,784 ft	1585 m 5,200 ft	5.75 km 3.57 mi	60.1364°N; 44.5293°W
31	Mont Forel	Schweizerland	3391 m 11,125 ft	1581 m 5,187 ft	357 km 222 mi	66.9354°N; 36.7873°W
32	Blaskbjerg	Island of Greenland	1600 m 5,249 ft	1575 m 5,167 ft	17.46 km 10.85 mi	73.3000°N; 24.0333°W
33	Kinaussak	Island of Greenland	1630 m 5,348 ft	1555 m 5,102 ft	88.3 km 54.9 mi	64.4500°N; 50.5167°W
34	Gaaseland high point	Island of Greenland	2100 m 6,890 ft	1550 m 5,085 ft	135.6 km 84.3 mi	70.2000°N; 27.6667°W
35	Sangmissoq high point	Island of Sammisoq	1549 m 5,082 ft	1549 m 5,082 ft	35.5 km 22.1 mi	60.0502°N; 43.9164°W
36	Favres Bjerg	Island of Greenland	2000 m 6,562 ft	1546 m 5,072 ft	117.1 km 72.8 mi	73.9500°N; 23.2000°W
37	Johnstrup Bjerge	Island of Greenland	2000 m 6,562 ft	1540 m 5,052 ft	30.9 km 19.21 mi	73.0000°N; 25.5333°W
38	Berzelius Bjerg	Island of Greenland	1810 m 5,938 ft	1535 m 5,036 ft	38.5 km 23.9 mi	72.4667°N; 25.0667°W

=== Canadian Arctic Archipelago ===
The 16 mountain peaks of the Canadian Arctic Archipelago with at least 1500 meters of topographic prominence
Rank	Mountain Peak	Mountain Range	Elevation	Prominence	Isolation	Location
1	Barbeau Peak	Ellesmere Island	2616 m 8,583 ft	2616 m 8,583 ft	796 km 495 mi	81.9138°N; 75.0116°W
2	Outlook Peak	Axel Heiberg Island	2210 m 7,251 ft	2210 m 7,251 ft	268 km 166.3 mi	79.7397°N; 91.4061°W
3	Mount Odin	Baffin Island	2143 m 7,031 ft	2143 m 7,031 ft	586 km 364 mi	66.5468°N; 65.4289°W
4	South Ellesmere Ice Cap High Point	Ellesmere Island	2347 m 7,700 ft	2044 m 6,706 ft	350 km 217 mi	78.8007°N; 79.5292°W
5	Angilaaq Mountain	Bylot Island	1944 m 6,378 ft	1944 m 6,378 ft	147.6 km 91.7 mi	73.2298°N; 78.6230°W
6	Devon Ice Cap High Point	Devon Island	1920 m 6,300 ft	1920 m 6,300 ft	265 km 164.6 mi	75.3429°N; 82.6186°W
7	Qiajivik Mountain	Baffin Island	1963 m 6,440 ft	1787 m 5,863 ft	725 km 450 mi	72.1806°N; 75.9111°W
8	Peak 08-46	Ellesmere Island	2181 m 7,156 ft	1745 m 5,725 ft	35.1 km 21.8 mi	80.1370°N; 76.7763°W
9	Ukpik Peak	Baffin Island	1809 m 5,935 ft	1650 m 5,413 ft	16.35 km 10.16 mi	70.6942°N; 71.3417°W
10	Tupeq Mountain	Baffin Island	2020 m 6,627 ft	1638 m 5,374 ft	14.21 km 8.83 mi	66.5737°N; 65.0717°W
11	Peak 1840	Baffin Island	1840 m 6,037 ft	1617 m 5,305 ft	84.9 km 52.8 mi	66.1519°N; 63.4918°W
12	Kisimngiuqtuq Peak	Baffin Island	1905 m 6,250 ft	1605 m 5,266 ft	216 km 134.1 mi	70.7972°N; 71.6500°W
13	Sillem Island High Point	Sillem Island	1590 m 5,217 ft	1590 m 5,217 ft	23.9 km 14.86 mi	71.0017°N; 71.8550°W
14	Peak 39-18	Baffin Island	1721 m 5,646 ft	1564 m 5,131 ft	139 km 86.4 mi	69.6500°N; 69.3000°W
15	Peak 35-44	Baffin Island	1562 m 5,125 ft	1559 m 5,115 ft	10.81 km 6.72 mi	70.5800°N; 70.7283°W
16	Angna Mountain	Baffin Island	1710 m 5,610 ft	1510 m 4,954 ft	73.7 km 45.8 mi	66.5595°N; 62.0273°W

=== Brooks Range ===
The 2 mountain peaks of the Brooks Range with at least 1500 meters of topographic prominence
Rank	Mountain Peak	Mountain Range	Elevation	Prominence	Isolation	Location
1	Mount Isto	Brooks Range	2736 m 8,976 ft	2401 m 7,877 ft	635 km 395 mi	69.2020°N; 143.80196°W
2	Mount Igikpak	Brooks Range	2523 m 8,276 ft	1867 m 6,126 ft	453 km 282 mi	67.4129°N; 154.9656°W

=== Aleutian Islands ===
The 11 mountain peaks of the Aleutian Islands with at least 1500 meters of topographic prominence
Rank	Mountain Peak	Mountain Range	Elevation	Prominence	Isolation	Location
1	Shishaldin Volcano	Unimak Island	2869 m 9,414 ft	2869 m 9,414 ft	877 km 545 mi	54.7554°N; 163.9709°W
2	Mount Vsevidof	Umnak Island	2149 m 7,051 ft	2149 m 7,051 ft	359 km 223 mi	53.1251°N; 168.6947°W
3	Pogromni Volcano	Unimak Island	1991 m 6,531 ft	1884 m 6,181 ft	50.9 km 31.7 mi	54.5705°N; 164.6926°W
4	Tanaga Volcano	Tanaga Island	1806 m 5,925 ft	1806 m 5,925 ft	656 km 407 mi	51.8833°N; 178.1333°W
5	Makushin Volcano	Unalaska Island	1800 m 5,905 ft	1800 m 5,905 ft	133.9 km 83.2 mi	53.8782°N; 166.9299°W
6	Isanotski Peaks	Unimak Island	2471 m 8,106 ft	1785 m 5,856 ft	15.62 km 9.71 mi	54.7515°N; 163.7288°W
7	Great Sitkin Volcano	Great Sitkin Island	1740 m 5,710 ft	1740 m 5,710 ft	139.9 km 86.9 mi	52.0756°N; 176.1114°W
8	Mount Cleveland	Chuginadak Island	1730 m 5,675 ft	1730 m 5,675 ft	90.7 km 56.3 mi	52.8230°N; 169.9465°W
9	Carlisle Volcano	Carlisle Island	1610 m 5,283 ft	1610 m 5,283 ft	10.53 km 6.54 mi	52.8913°N; 170.0580°W
10	Mount Gareloi	Gareloi Island	1573 m 5,160 ft	1573 m 5,160 ft	46.3 km 28.7 mi	51.7880°N; 178.7940°W
11	Korovin Volcano	Atka Island	1533 m 5,030 ft	1533 m 5,030 ft	138.3 km 85.9 mi	52.3789°N; 174.1561°W

=== Aleutian Range ===
The 9 mountain peaks of the Aleutian Range with at least 1500 meters of topographic prominence
Rank	Mountain Peak	Mountain Range	Elevation	Prominence	Isolation	Location
1	Redoubt Volcano	Aleutian Range	3108 m 10,197 ft	2788 m 9,147 ft	94.5 km 58.7 mi	60.4851°N; 152.7439°W
2	Pavlof Volcano	Aleutian Range	2515 m 8,250 ft	2507 m 8,225 ft	151.8 km 94.3 mi	55.4175°N; 161.8932°W
3	Mount Veniaminof	Aleutian Range	2507 m 8,225 ft	2499 m 8,200 ft	337 km 210 mi	56.2191°N; 159.2980°W
4	Iliamna Volcano	Aleutian Range	3053 m 10,016 ft	2398 m 7,866 ft	54.1 km 33.6 mi	60.0321°N; 153.0915°W
5	Mount Griggs	Aleutian Range	2332 m 7,650 ft	2225 m 7,300 ft	219 km 136.3 mi	58.3534°N; 155.0958°W
6	Mount Chiginagak	Aleutian Range	2111 m 6,925 ft	2035 m 6,675 ft	157.2 km 97.7 mi	57.1312°N; 156.9836°W
7	Mount Neacola	Aleutian Range	2873 m 9,426 ft	1943 m 6,376 ft	49.9 km 31 mi	60.7981°N; 153.3959°W
8	Mount Douglas	Aleutian Range	2149 m 7,050 ft	1920 m 6,300 ft	69 km 42.9 mi	58.8598°N; 153.5353°W
9	Frosty Peak	Aleutian Range	1769 m 5,803 ft	1754 m 5,753 ft	56.9 km 35.4 mi	55.0672°N; 162.8349°W

=== Alaska Range ===
The 12 mountain peaks of the Alaska Range with at least 1500 meters of topographic prominence
Rank	Mountain Peak	Mountain Range	Elevation	Prominence	Isolation	Location
1	Denali	Alaska Range	6191 m 20,310 ft	6141 m 20,146 ft	7,450 km 4,629 mi	63.0690°N; 151.0063°W
2	Mount Hayes	Alaska Range	4216 m 13,832 ft	3507 m 11,507 ft	205 km 127.2 mi	63.6199°N; 146.7174°W
3	Mount Torbert	Alaska Range	3479 m 11,413 ft	2648 m 8,688 ft	157.3 km 97.8 mi	61.4086°N; 152.4125°W
4	Mount Kimball	Alaska Range	3155 m 10,350 ft	2263 m 7,425 ft	89.8 km 55.8 mi	63.2390°N; 144.6419°W
5	Mount Foraker	Alaska Range	5304 m 17,400 ft	2210 m 7,250 ft	23 km 14.27 mi	62.9605°N; 151.3992°W
6	Mount Hesperus	Alaska Range	2996 m 9,828 ft	2127 m 6,978 ft	93.5 km 58.1 mi	61.8036°N; 154.1469°W
7	Kichatna Spire	Alaska Range	2739 m 8,985 ft	1900 m 6,235 ft	60 km 37.3 mi	62.4231°N; 152.7231°W
8	Mount Russell	Alaska Range	3557 m 11,670 ft	1682 m 5,520 ft	24.2 km 15.04 mi	62.7983°N; 151.8844°W
9	Tetlin Peak	Alaska Range	2550 m 8,365 ft	1597 m 5,240 ft	41.1 km 25.5 mi	62.6215°N; 143.1084°W
10	Mount Deborah	Alaska Range	3761 m 12,339 ft	1582 m 5,189 ft	25.9 km 16.08 mi	63.6379°N; 147.2382°W
11	Necous Peak	Alaska Range	2541 m 8,336 ft	1581 m 5,186 ft	35.3 km 21.9 mi	61.1125°N; 153.4690°W
12	Stony Peak	Alaska Range	2587 m 8,488 ft	1566 m 5,138 ft	19.19 km 11.92 mi	61.4950°N; 153.6224°W

=== Wrangell Mountains ===
The 4 mountain peaks of the Wrangell Mountains with at least 1500 meters of topographic prominence
Rank	Mountain Peak	Mountain Range	Elevation	Prominence	Isolation	Location
1	Mount Blackburn	Wrangell Mountains	4996 m 16,390 ft	3548 m 11,640 ft	97.6 km 60.7 mi	61.7305°N; 143.4031°W
2	Mount Sanford	Wrangell Mountains	4949 m 16,237 ft	2343 m 7,687 ft	64.8 km 40.3 mi	62.2132°N; 144.1292°W
3	Mount Drum	Wrangell Mountains	3661 m 12,010 ft	2060 m 6,760 ft	28.5 km 17.73 mi	62.1159°N; 144.6394°W
4	Mount Wrangell	Wrangell Mountains	4317 m 14,163 ft	1711 m 5,613 ft	23.8 km 14.79 mi	62.0059°N; 144.0187°W

=== Talkeetna Mountains ===
The one mountain peak of the Talkeetna Mountains with at least 1500 meters of topographic prominence
Rank	Mountain Peak	Mountain Range	Elevation	Prominence	Isolation	Location
1	Sovereign Mountain	Talkeetna Mountains	2697 m 8,849 ft	1790 m 5,874 ft	76.6 km 47.6 mi	62.1311°N; 148.6044°W

=== Kenai Mountains ===
The 2 mountain peaks of the Kenai Mountains with at least 1500 meters of topographic prominence
Rank	Mountain Peak	Mountain Range	Elevation	Prominence	Isolation	Location
1	Truuli Peak	Kenai Mountains	2015 m 6,612 ft	1848 m 6,062 ft	143.1 km 88.9 mi	59.9129°N; 150.4348°W
2	Isthmus Peak	Kenai Mountains	1991 m 6,532 ft	1762 m 5,782 ft	52 km 32.3 mi	60.5772°N; 148.8908°W

=== Chugach Mountains ===
The 8 mountain peaks of the Chugach Mountains with at least 1500 meters of topographic prominence
Rank	Mountain Peak	Mountain Range	Elevation	Prominence	Isolation	Location
1	Mount Marcus Baker	Chugach Mountains	4016 m 13,176 ft	3277 m 10,751 ft	204 km 126.8 mi	61.4374°N; 147.7525°W
2	Mount Tom White	Chugach Mountains	3411 m 11,191 ft	2329 m 7,641 ft	117.6 km 73 mi	60.6512°N; 143.6970°W
3	De Long Peak	Chugach Mountains	2464 m 8,084 ft	1900 m 6,234 ft	80.8 km 50.2 mi	60.8299°N; 145.1335°W
4	Dewey Peak(Alaska)	Chugach Mountains	2441 m 8,010 ft	1878 m 6,160 ft	40.7 km 25.3 mi	61.1605°N; 144.8129°W
5	Hanagita Peak	Chugach Mountains	2592 m 8,504 ft	1815 m 5,954 ft	45.1 km 28 mi	61.0670°N; 143.7075°W
6	Mount Steller	Chugach Mountains	3216 m 10,550 ft	1635 m 5,365 ft	36.2 km 22.5 mi	58.4299°N; 154.3893°W
7	Bashful Peak	Chugach Mountains	2440 m 8,005 ft	1608 m 5,275 ft	36.8 km 22.9 mi	61.3076°N; 148.8697°W
8	Copper Peak	Chugach Mountains	2108 m 6,915 ft	1544 m 5,065 ft	17.87 km 11.1 mi	61.3297°N; 144.9599°W

=== Saint Elias Mountains ===
The 23 mountain peaks of the Saint Elias Mountains with at least 1500 meters of topographic prominence
Rank	Mountain Peak	Region	Mountain Range	Elevation	Prominence	Isolation	Location
1	Mount Logan	Yukon	Saint Elias Mountains	5959 m 19,551 ft	5247 m 17,215 ft	623 km 387 mi	60.5666°N; 140.4072°W
2	Mount Fairweather (Fairweather Mountain)	Alaska; British Columbia	Saint Elias Mountains	4671 m 15,325 ft	3961 m 12,995 ft	201 km 124.7 mi	58.9064°N; 137.5265°W
3	Mount Saint Elias	Alaska; Yukon	Saint Elias Mountains	5489 m 18,008 ft	3429 m 11,250 ft	41.2 km 25.6 mi	60.2927°N; 140.9307°W
4	Mount Lucania	Yukon	Saint Elias Mountains	5260 m 17,257 ft	3080 m 10,105 ft	43 km 26.7 mi	61.0215°N; 140.4661°W
5	Mount Vancouver	Yukon	Saint Elias Mountains	4812 m 15,787 ft	2712 m 8,898 ft	44.1 km 27.4 mi	60.3589°N; 139.6980°W
6	Mount Hubbard	Alaska; Yukon	Saint Elias Mountains	4557 m 14,950 ft	2457 m 8,061 ft	34.4 km 21.3 mi	60.3194°N; 139.0726°W
7	Mount Cook	Alaska; Yukon	Saint Elias Mountains	4194 m 13,760 ft	2350 m 7,710 ft	23.4 km 14.54 mi	60.1816°N; 139.9811°W
8	Mount Crillon	Alaska	Saint Elias Mountains	3879 m 12,726 ft	2187 m 7,176 ft	31.4 km 19.52 mi	58.6625°N; 137.1716°W
9	Mount Bona	Alaska	Saint Elias Mountains	5044 m 16,550 ft	2103 m 6,900 ft	80 km 49.7 mi	61.3845°N; 141.7529°W
10	Alsek Peak	Yukon	Saint Elias Mountains	2720 m 8,924 ft	2025 m 6,644 ft	68.5 km 42.5 mi	60.0325°N; 137.5915°W
11	Mount Cairnes	Yukon	Saint Elias Mountains	2820 m 9,252 ft	2000 m 6,562 ft	40.2 km 25 mi	60.8683°N; 138.2764°W
12	Buckwell Peak	British Columbia; Yukon	Saint Elias Mountains	2721 m 8,927 ft	1971 m 6,467 ft	56.4 km 35 mi	59.4188°N; 136.7653°W
13	Detour Peak	British Columbia; Yukon	Saint Elias Mountains	2550 m 8,366 ft	1906 m 6,253 ft	21.2 km 13.16 mi	59.8424°N; 137.5856°W
14	Mount Natazhat	Alaska	Saint Elias Mountains	4095 m 13,435 ft	1824 m 5,985 ft	24.9 km 15.49 mi	61.5217°N; 141.1030°W
15	Mount Martha Black	Yukon	Saint Elias Mountains	2512 m 8,241 ft	1797 m 5,896 ft	18.59 km 11.55 mi	60.6716°N; 137.6224°W
16	Mount Seattle	Alaska	Saint Elias Mountains	3155 m 10,350 ft	1695 m 5,561 ft	19.26 km 11.97 mi	60.0664°N; 139.1908°W
17	Mount Archibald	Yukon	Saint Elias Mountains	2588 m 8,491 ft	1678 m 5,505 ft	23.8 km 14.81 mi	60.7842°N; 137.8736°W
18	Mount Foresta	Alaska	Saint Elias Mountains	3368 m 11,050 ft	1646 m 5,400 ft	20.1 km 12.51 mi	60.1912°N; 139.4323°W
19	Bearhole Peak	Alaska	Saint Elias Mountains	2596 m 8,517 ft	1636 m 5,367 ft	43.5 km 27 mi	60.9283°N; 142.5237°W
20	Mount Miller	Alaska	Saint Elias Mountains	3277 m 10,750 ft	1615 m 5,300 ft	64.9 km 40.3 mi	60.4605°N; 142.3012°W
21	Mount Augusta	Alaska; Yukon	Saint Elias Mountains	4289 m 14,070 ft	1549 m 5,082 ft	23.2 km 14.41 mi	60.3074°N; 140.4584°W
22	Dalton Peak	Yukon	Saint Elias Mountains	2329 m 7,641 ft	1549 m 5,082 ft	32.9 km 20.4 mi	60.4767°N; 137.1728°W
23	Mount Bear	Alaska	Saint Elias Mountains	4520 m 14,831 ft	1540 m 5,052 ft	32.4 km 20.1 mi	61.2834°N; 141.1433°W

=== Mackenzie Mountains and the Yukon Plateau ===
The 5 mountain peaks of the Mackenzie Mountains and the Yukon plateau with at least 1500 meters of topographic prominence
Rank	Mountain Peak	Region	Mountain Range	Elevation	Prominence	Isolation	Location
1	Keele Peak	Yukon	Mackenzie Mountains	2952 m 9,685 ft	2161 m 7,090 ft	543 km 337 mi	63.4314°N; 130.3243°W
2	Mount Nirvana	Northwest Territories	Mackenzie Mountains	2773 m 9,098 ft	1663 m 5,456 ft	220 km 136.8 mi	61.8752°N; 127.6807°W
3	Mount Macdonald	Yukon	Mackenzie Mountains	2760 m 9,055 ft	1555 m 5,102 ft	187.5 km 116.5 mi	64.7256°N; 132.7781°W
4	Pass Mountain	Yukon	Mackenzie Mountains	2515 m 8,250 ft	1524 m 5,000 ft	29.2 km 18.11 mi	64.5140°N; 133.6254°W
5	Grey Hunter Peak	Yukon	North Yukon Plateau	2214 m 7,264 ft	1519 m 4,984 ft	178.7 km 111 mi	63.1357°N; 135.6359°W

=== Alexander Archipelago and Vancouver Island ===
The 5 mountain peaks of the Alexander Archipelago and Vancouver Island with at least 1500 meters of topographic prominence
Rank	Mountain Peak	Region	Mountain Range	Elevation	Prominence	Isolation	Location
1	Golden Hinde	British Columbia	Vancouver Island	2195 m 7,201 ft	2195 m 7,201 ft	154.8 km 96.2 mi	49.6627°N; 125.7470°W
2	Victoria Peak	British Columbia	Vancouver Island	2159 m 7,083 ft	1845 m 6,053 ft	35.4 km 22 mi	50.0547°N; 126.1008°W
3	Baranof Island High Point	Alaska	Baranof Island	1643 m 5,390 ft	1643 m 5,390 ft	128.3 km 79.7 mi	57.0151°N; 134.9882°W
4	Rugged Mountain	British Columbia	Vancouver Island	1861 m 6,106 ft	1571 m 5,154 ft	41.5 km 25.8 mi	50.0252°N; 126.6778°W
5	Hkusam Mountain	British Columbia	Vancouver Island	1645 m 5,397 ft	1508 m 4,948 ft	36.3 km 22.5 mi	50.3349°N; 125.8407°W

=== Coast Mountains ===
The 53 mountain peaks of the Coast Mountains with at least 1500 meters of topographic prominence
Rank	Mountain Peak	Region	Mountain Range	Elevation	Prominence	Isolation	Location
1	Mount Waddington	British Columbia	Coast Mountains	4019 m 13,186 ft	3289 m 10,791 ft	562 km 349 mi	51.3737°N; 125.2636°W
2	Monarch Mountain	British Columbia	Coast Mountains	3555 m 11,663 ft	2925 m 9,596 ft	71.4 km 44.4 mi	51.8995°N; 125.8760°W
3	Skihist Mountain	British Columbia	Coast Mountains	2968 m 9,738 ft	2458 m 8,064 ft	157.1 km 97.6 mi	50.1878°N; 121.9032°W
4	Mount Ratz	British Columbia	Coast Mountains	3090 m 10,138 ft	2430 m 7,972 ft	311 km 193.4 mi	57.3930°N; 132.3031°W
5	Mount Queen Bess	British Columbia	Coast Mountains	3298 m 10,820 ft	2355 m 7,726 ft	45.5 km 28.3 mi	51.2714°N; 124.5682°W
6	Wedge Mountain	British Columbia	Coast Mountains	2892 m 9,488 ft	2249 m 7,379 ft	63.9 km 39.7 mi	50.1330°N; 122.7933°W
7	Otter Mountain	British Columbia	Coast Mountains	2692 m 8,832 ft	2242 m 7,356 ft	25.4 km 15.78 mi	56.0066°N; 129.6928°W
8	Kwatna Peak	British Columbia	Coast Mountains	2290 m 7,513 ft	2225 m 7,300 ft	36.9 km 22.9 mi	52.0706°N; 126.9630°W
9	Scud Peak	British Columbia	Coast Mountains	2987 m 9,800 ft	2172 m 7,126 ft	57.4 km 35.7 mi	57.2412°N; 131.1676°W
10	Razorback Mountain	British Columbia	Coast Mountains	3183 m 10,443 ft	2153 m 7,064 ft	36.5 km 22.7 mi	51.5905°N; 124.6912°W
11	Oscar Peak	British Columbia	Coast Mountains	2336 m 7,664 ft	2099 m 6,886 ft	35.5 km 22 mi	54.9289°N; 129.0594°W
12	Mount Jancowski	British Columbia	Coast Mountains	2729 m 8,953 ft	2079 m 6,821 ft	124 km 77.1 mi	56.3372°N; 129.9817°W
13	Mount Valpy	British Columbia	Coast Mountains	2219 m 7,280 ft	2014 m 6,608 ft	49.4 km 30.7 mi	54.2750°N; 129.0564°W
14	Chatsquot Mountain	British Columbia	Coast Mountains	2365 m 7,759 ft	1981 m 6,499 ft	57.7 km 35.8 mi	53.1422°N; 127.4773°W
15	Mount Priestley	British Columbia	Coast Mountains	2366 m 7,762 ft	1945 m 6,381 ft	50.4 km 31.3 mi	55.2297°N; 128.8759°W
16	Sharks Teeth Peaks	British Columbia	Coast Mountains	2304 m 7,559 ft	1914 m 6,280 ft	21.9 km 13.6 mi	53.0071°N; 127.2400°W
17	Snow Tower	Alaska	Coast Mountains	2003 m 6,572 ft	1866 m 6,122 ft	24.3 km 15.07 mi	58.1724°N; 133.4009°W
18	Seven Sisters Peaks	British Columbia	Coast Mountains	2747 m 9,012 ft	1862 m 6,109 ft	68.8 km 42.7 mi	54.9678°N; 128.2319°W
19	Mount Saugstad	British Columbia	Coast Mountains	2908 m 9,541 ft	1850 m 6,070 ft	38.6 km 24 mi	52.2542°N; 126.5148°W
20	Brian Boru Peak	British Columbia	Coast Mountains	2507 m 8,225 ft	1832 m 6,010 ft	32.8 km 20.4 mi	55.0739°N; 127.5742°W
21	Howson Peak	British Columbia	Coast Mountains	2759 m 9,052 ft	1829 m 6,001 ft	254 km 158 mi	54.4185°N; 127.7441°W
22	Atna Peak	British Columbia	Coast Mountains	2724 m 8,937 ft	1828 m 5,997 ft	56.8 km 35.3 mi	53.9398°N; 128.0456°W
23	Tsaydaychuz Peak	British Columbia	Coast Mountains	2758 m 9,049 ft	1826 m 5,991 ft	82.8 km 51.4 mi	53.0212°N; 126.6401°W
24	Birkenhead Peak	British Columbia	Coast Mountains	2506 m 8,222 ft	1781 m 5,843 ft	21 km 13.06 mi	50.5112°N; 122.6210°W
25	Chutine Peak	British Columbia	Coast Mountains	2903 m 9,524 ft	1758 m 5,768 ft	42.6 km 26.5 mi	57.7753°N; 132.3346°W
26	Unuk Peak	British Columbia	Coast Mountains	2595 m 8,514 ft	1725 m 5,659 ft	13.79 km 8.57 mi	56.3764°N; 130.1933°W
27	Devils Paw	Alaska; British Columbia	Coast Mountains	2593 m 8,507 ft	1720 m 5,643 ft	138.3 km 85.9 mi	58.7296°N; 133.8407°W
28	Sittakanay Peak	British Columbia	Coast Mountains	2415 m 7,923 ft	1710 m 5,610 ft	39.4 km 24.5 mi	58.4786°N; 133.3623°W
29	Thunder Mountain	British Columbia	Coast Mountains	2664 m 8,740 ft	1694 m 5,558 ft	27.6 km 17.14 mi	52.5531°N; 126.3698°W
30	Overseer Mountain	British Columbia	Coast Mountains	2749 m 9,019 ft	1679 m 5,509 ft	19.39 km 12.05 mi	50.5288°N; 123.3809°W
31	King Island High Point	British Columbia	King Island	1679 m 5,509 ft	1679 m 5,509 ft	36.5 km 22.7 mi	52.3216°N; 127.3065°W
32	Talchako Mountain	British Columbia	Coast Mountains	3037 m 9,964 ft	1676 m 5,499 ft	23.5 km 14.58 mi	52.0919°N; 126.0159°W
33	Whiting Peak	British Columbia	Coast Mountains	2524 m 8,281 ft	1669 m 5,476 ft	53.9 km 33.5 mi	58.1389°N; 132.9346°W
34	Faisal Peak	British Columbia	Coast Mountains	2239 m 7,346 ft	1669 m 5,476 ft	34 km 21.1 mi	56.8857°N; 130.5798°W
35	Mount Lester Jones	British Columbia	Coast Mountains	2408 m 7,900 ft	1658 m 5,440 ft	27.7 km 17.21 mi	58.7174°N; 133.2306°W
36	Hubris Peak	British Columbia	Coast Mountains	2445 m 8,022 ft	1640 m 5,381 ft	51.9 km 32.2 mi	56.5518°N; 130.9733°W
37	Mount Porsild	Yukon	Coast Mountains	2540 m 8,333 ft	1630 m 5,348 ft	NA	60.0839°N; 136.0153°W
38	Mount Judge Howay	British Columbia	Coast Mountains	2262 m 7,421 ft	1627 m 5,338 ft	36.7 km 22.8 mi	49.5072°N; 122.3218°W
39	Mount Pattullo	British Columbia	Coast Mountains	2727 m 8,947 ft	1617 m 5,305 ft	23.1 km 14.37 mi	56.2339°N; 129.6576°W
40	Mount Tatlow	British Columbia	Coast Mountains	3063 m 10,049 ft	1613 m 5,292 ft	34.4 km 21.4 mi	51.3843°N; 123.8641°W
41	Hudson Bay Mountain	British Columbia	Coast Mountains	2589 m 8,494 ft	1609 m 5,279 ft	51 km 31.7 mi	54.8116°N; 127.3396°W
42	Corsan Peak	British Columbia	Coast Mountains	1934 m 6,345 ft	1609 m 5,279 ft	59.3 km 36.8 mi	51.0175°N; 126.4058°W
43	Monmouth Mountain (Mount Monmouth)	British Columbia	Coast Mountains	3182 m 10,440 ft	1602 m 5,256 ft	31.6 km 19.6 mi	50.9924°N; 123.7900°W
44	Mount Addenbroke	British Columbia	East Redonda Island	1591 m 5,220 ft	1591 m 5,220 ft	43.9 km 27.2 mi	50.2316°N; 124.6861°W
45	Estero Peak	British Columbia	Coast Mountains	1664 m 5,459 ft	1589 m 5,213 ft	12.57 km 7.81 mi	50.4620°N; 125.1860°W
46	Mount Seton	British Columbia	Coast Mountains	2855 m 9,367 ft	1580 m 5,184 ft	20.4 km 12.64 mi	50.6237°N; 122.2600°W
47	Whitecap Mountain	British Columbia	Coast Mountains	2918 m 9,573 ft	1533 m 5,030 ft	72.8 km 45.2 mi	50.7162°N; 122.5085°W
48	Mount Monkley	British Columbia	Coast Mountains	1967 m 6,453 ft	1529 m 5,016 ft	29.3 km 18.23 mi	54.8914°N; 129.6477°W
49	The Horn	British Columbia	Coast Mountains	2907 m 9,537 ft	1527 m 5,010 ft	20.3 km 12.63 mi	52.3190°N; 126.2363°W
50	Ambition Mountain	British Columbia	Coast Mountains	2953 m 9,688 ft	1513 m 4,964 ft	25.7 km 15.95 mi	57.3949°N; 131.4851°W
51	Kitlope Peak	British Columbia	Coast Mountains	1950 m 6,398 ft	1505 m 4,938 ft	15.97 km 9.92 mi	53.0381°N; 127.6414°W
52	Robertson Peak	British Columbia	Coast Mountains	2252 m 7,388 ft	1502 m 4,928 ft	16.29 km 10.12 mi	49.6460°N; 122.2502°W
53	Mount Van der Est	British Columbia	Coast Mountains	1801 m 5,909 ft	1502 m 4,928 ft	35.7 km 22.2 mi	50.5565°N; 125.2832°W

=== Interior Mountains and Interior Plateau ===
The 13 mountain peaks of the Interior Mountains and the Interior Plateau with at least 1500 meters of topographic prominence
Rank	Mountain Peak	Region	Mountain Range	Elevation	Prominence	Isolation	Location
1	Shedin Peak	British Columbia	Skeena Mountains	2588 m 8,491 ft	1798 m 5,899 ft	118.2 km 73.4 mi	55.9392°N; 127.4799°W
2	Mount Edziza	British Columbia	Tahltan Highland	2793 m 9,163 ft	1763 m 5,784 ft	61.8 km 38.4 mi	57.7156°N; 130.6345°W
3	Thudaka Peak	British Columbia	Cassiar Mountains	2748 m 9,016 ft	1739 m 5,705 ft	103.5 km 64.3 mi	57.9272°N; 126.8485°W
4	Mount Perseus	British Columbia	Quesnel Highland	2553 m 8,376 ft	1683 m 5,522 ft	40.7 km 25.3 mi	52.3541°N; 120.5327°W
5	Mount Thomlinson	British Columbia	Skeena Mountains	2451 m 8,041 ft	1661 m 5,449 ft	44 km 27.4 mi	55.5439°N; 127.4864°W
6	Sharktooth Mountain	British Columbia	Cassiar Mountains	2668 m 8,753 ft	1653 m 5,423 ft	98.4 km 61.2 mi	58.5876°N; 127.9625°W
7	Mount Cronin	British Columbia	Skeena Mountains	2396 m 7,861 ft	1571 m 5,154 ft	33.3 km 20.7 mi	54.9301°N; 126.8638°W
8	Kispiox Mountain	British Columbia	Skeena Mountains	2096 m 6,877 ft	1561 m 5,121 ft	33.1 km 20.6 mi	55.3985°N; 127.9435°W
9	Mount Wotzke	British Columbia	Quesnel Highland	2597 m 8,520 ft	1556 m 5,105 ft	58.8 km 36.6 mi	52.7131°N; 120.6507°W
10	Mount Sylvia	British Columbia	Muskwa Ranges	2940 m 9,646 ft	1559 m 5,115 ft	84.9 km 52.8 mi	58.0820°N; 124.4688°W
11	Vile Peak	British Columbia	Skeena Mountains	2189 m 7,182 ft	1551 m 5,089 ft	65 km 40.4 mi	56.2711°N; 128.3401°W
12	Mount Tod	British Columbia	Thompson Plateau	2155 m 7,070 ft	1523 m 4,997 ft	57.9 km 36 mi	50.9166°N; 119.9407°W
13	Gataga Peak	British Columbia	Muskwa Ranges	2533 m 8,310 ft	1515 m 4,970 ft	35.3 km 21.9 mi	58.0697°N; 125.7010°W

=== Columbia Mountains ===
The 17 mountain peaks of the Columbia Mountains with at least 1500 meters of topographic prominence
Rank	Mountain Peak	Region	Mountain Range	Elevation	Prominence	Isolation	Location
1	Mount Sir Wilfrid Laurier	British Columbia	Columbia Mountains	3516 m 11,535 ft	2728 m 8,950 ft	51.7 km 32.1 mi	52.8015°N; 119.7315°W
2	Mount Sir Sandford	British Columbia	Columbia Mountains	3519 m 11,545 ft	2703 m 8,868 ft	62 km 38.5 mi	51.6566°N; 117.8676°W
3	Mount Odin	British Columbia	Columbia Mountains	2971 m 9,747 ft	2409 m 7,904 ft	65.4 km 40.7 mi	50.5518°N; 118.1293°W
4	Mount Monashee	British Columbia	Columbia Mountains	3274 m 10,741 ft	2404 m 7,887 ft	51.8 km 32.2 mi	52.3853°N; 118.9399°W
5	Mount Cooper	British Columbia	Columbia Mountains	3094 m 10,151 ft	2319 m 7,608 ft	49.9 km 31 mi	50.1797°N; 117.1992°W
6	Mount Farnham	British Columbia	Columbia Mountains	3493 m 11,460 ft	2113 m 6,932 ft	72.7 km 45.2 mi	50.4888°N; 116.4871°W
7	Gladsheim Peak	British Columbia	Columbia Mountains	2830 m 9,285 ft	2056 m 6,745 ft	53.4 km 33.2 mi	49.7867°N; 117.6272°W
8	Mount Dawson	British Columbia	Columbia Mountains	3377 m 11,079 ft	2045 m 6,709 ft	63.4 km 39.4 mi	51.1516°N; 117.4206°W
9	Kootenay Mountain	British Columbia	Columbia Mountains	2456 m 8,058 ft	1801 m 5,909 ft	60 km 37.3 mi	49.2407°N; 116.8226°W
10	Cond Peak	British Columbia	Columbia Mountains	2801 m 9,190 ft	1720 m 5,643 ft	35.3 km 21.9 mi	49.7462°N; 117.1419°W
11	Pukeashun Mountain	British Columbia	Columbia Mountains	2301 m 7,549 ft	1696 m 5,564 ft	56.4 km 35.1 mi	51.2046°N; 119.2353°W
12	Morton Peak	British Columbia	Columbia Mountains	2250 m 7,382 ft	1695 m 5,561 ft	43.5 km 27 mi	50.7653°N; 118.8430°W
13	The Pinnacles	British Columbia	Columbia Mountains	2573 m 8,442 ft	1667 m 5,469 ft	40.3 km 25 mi	50.1953°N; 118.2290°W
14	Upper Saddle Mountain	British Columbia	Columbia Mountains	2330 m 7,644 ft	1645 m 5,397 ft	23.6 km 14.68 mi	50.1726°N; 117.9000°W
15	Abercrombie Mountain	Washington	Columbia Mountains	2229 m 7,312 ft	1578 m 5,178 ft	22.6 km 14.06 mi	48.9283°N; 117.4601°W
16	Kaza Mountain	British Columbia	Columbia Mountains	2543 m 8,343 ft	1573 m 5,161 ft	35.5 km 22 mi	53.0711°N; 121.0089°W
17	Dunn Peak	British Columbia	Columbia Mountains	2636 m 8,648 ft	1531 m 5,023 ft	87.1 km 54.1 mi	51.4372°N; 119.9546°W

=== Canadian Rockies ===
The 19 mountain peaks of the Rocky Mountains of Canada with at least 1500 meters of topographic prominence
Rank	Mountain Peak	Region	Mountain Range	Elevation	Prominence	Isolation	Location
1	Mount Robson	British Columbia	Canadian Rockies	3959 m 12,989 ft	2829 m 9,281 ft	460 km 286 mi	53.1105°N; 119.1566°W
2	Mount Columbia	Alberta; British Columbia	Canadian Rockies	3741 m 12,274 ft	2371 m 7,779 ft	158 km 98.2 mi	52.1473°N; 117.4416°W
3	Ulysses Mountain	British Columbia	Muskwa Ranges	3024 m 9,921 ft	2294 m 7,526 ft	436 km 271 mi	57.3464°N; 124.0928°W
4	Mount Assiniboine	Alberta; British Columbia	Canadian Rockies	3616 m 11,864 ft	2082 m 6,831 ft	141.8 km 88.1 mi	50.8696°N; 115.6509°W
5	Mount Edith Cavell	Alberta	Canadian Rockies	3363 m 11,033 ft	2033 m 6,670 ft	47.2 km 29.3 mi	52.6672°N; 118.0569°W
6	Mount Goodsir	British Columbia	Canadian Rockies	3567 m 11,703 ft	1917 m 6,289 ft	64.1 km 39.8 mi	51.2021°N; 116.3975°W
7	Mount Harrison	British Columbia	Canadian Rockies	3360 m 11,024 ft	1770 m 5,807 ft	52.1 km 32.4 mi	50.0604°N; 115.2057°W
8	Mount Sir Alexander	British Columbia	Canadian Rockies	3275 m 10,745 ft	1762 m 5,781 ft	87.8 km 54.5 mi	53.9360°N; 120.3869°W
9	Mount Hector	Alberta	Canadian Rockies	3394 m 11,135 ft	1759 m 5,771 ft	21.5 km 13.34 mi	51.5752°N; 116.2590°W
10	Whitehorn Mountain	British Columbia	Canadian Rockies	3399 m 11,152 ft	1747 m 5,732 ft	7.94 km 4.93 mi	53.1370°N; 119.2667°W
11	Mount Chown	Alberta	Canadian Rockies	3316 m 10,879 ft	1746 m 5,728 ft	30.7 km 19.05 mi	53.3971°N; 119.4173°W
12	Jeanette Peak	British Columbia	Canadian Rockies	3089 m 10,135 ft	1657 m 5,436 ft	20.3 km 12.6 mi	52.6357°N; 118.6166°W
13	Mount Forbes	Alberta	Canadian Rockies	3617 m 11,867 ft	1649 m 5,410 ft	47.4 km 29.5 mi	51.8600°N; 116.9316°W
14	Mount Fryatt	Alberta	Canadian Rockies	3361 m 11,027 ft	1608 m 5,276 ft	16.37 km 10.17 mi	52.5503°N; 117.9104°W
15	Mount Ovington	British Columbia	Hart Ranges	2949 m 9,675 ft	1600 m 5,249 ft	18.75 km 11.65 mi	54.1433°N; 120.5740°W
16	Mount Crysdale	British Columbia	Misinchinka Ranges	2429 m 7,969 ft	1554 m 5,098 ft	147.3 km 91.5 mi	55.9383°N; 123.4210°W
17	Mount Temple	Alberta	Canadian Rockies	3540 m 11,614 ft	1530 m 5,020 ft	21.3 km 13.22 mi	51.3511°N; 116.2063°W
18	Mount Ida	British Columbia	Canadian Rockies	3200 m 10,499 ft	1530 m 5,020 ft	14.14 km 8.79 mi	54.0580°N; 120.3268°W
19	Mount Joffre	Alberta; British Columbia	Canadian Rockies	3433 m 11,263 ft	1505 m 4,938 ft	49.2 km 30.6 mi	50.5285°N; 115.2069°W

=== US Coast Ranges ===
The 2 mountain peaks of the Coast Range with at least 1500 meters of topographic prominence
Rank	Mountain Peak	Region	Mountain Range	Elevation	Prominence	Isolation	Location
1	Mount Olympus	Washington	Olympic Mountains	2432 m 7,980 ft	2389 m 7,838 ft	173.7 km 108 mi	47.8013°N; 123.7108°W
2	Mount Eddy	California	Klamath Mountains	2755 m 9,037 ft	1571 m 5,153 ft	23.5 km 14.58 mi	41.3196°N; 122.4790°W

=== Cascade Range and Sierra Nevada ===
The 12 mountain peaks of the Cascade Range and Sierra Nevada with at least 1500 meters of topographic prominence
Rank	Mountain Peak	Region	Mountain Range	Elevation	Prominence	Isolation	Location
1	Mount Rainier	Washington	Cascade Range	4394 m 14,417 ft	4034 m 13,236 ft	1,177 km 731 mi	46.8521°N; 121.7579°W
2	Mount Whitney	California	Sierra Nevada	4421 m 14,505 ft	3072 m 10,079 ft	2,649 km 1,646 mi	36.5786°N; 118.2920°W
3	Mount Shasta	California	Cascade Range	4322 m 14,179 ft	2997 m 9,832 ft	539 km 335 mi	41.4092°N; 122.1949°W
4	Mount Baker	Washington	Cascade Range	3287 m 10,786 ft	2696 m 8,845 ft	212 km 131.5 mi	48.7768°N; 121.8145°W
5	Mount Adams	Washington	Cascade Range	3743 m 12,281 ft	2480 m 8,136 ft	73.6 km 45.8 mi	46.2024°N; 121.4909°W
6	Mount Hood	Oregon	Cascade Range	3429 m 11,249 ft	2349 m 7,706 ft	92.2 km 57.3 mi	45.3735°N; 121.6959°W
7	Glacier Peak	Washington	Cascade Range	3214 m 10,545 ft	2291 m 7,518 ft	90.2 km 56 mi	48.1125°N; 121.1138°W
8	Silvertip Mountain	British Columbia	Cascade Range	2596 m 8,517 ft	1876 m 6,155 ft	19.55 km 12.15 mi	49.1633°N; 121.2161°W
9	Mount Jefferson	Oregon	Cascade Range	3201 m 10,502 ft	1767 m 5,797 ft	77.5 km 48.1 mi	44.6743°N; 121.7996°W
10	South Sister	Oregon	Cascade Range	3159 m 10,363 ft	1709 m 5,608 ft	63.4 km 39.4 mi	44.1035°N; 121.7693°W
11	Mount Stuart	Washington	Cascade Range	2871 m 9,420 ft	1632 m 5,354 ft	71.6 km 44.5 mi	47.4751°N; 120.9024°W
12	Lassen Peak	California	Cascade Range	3189 m 10,462 ft	1594 m 5,229 ft	114.9 km 71.4 mi	40.4882°N; 121.5050°W

=== Transverse Ranges and US Peninsular Ranges ===
The 3 mountain peaks of the Transverse Ranges and the US part of the Peninsular Ranges with at least 1500 meters of topographic prominence
Rank	Mountain Peak	Region	Mountain Range	Elevation	Prominence	Isolation	Location
1	San Jacinto Peak	California	San Jacinto Mountains	3302 m 10,834 ft	2542 m 8,339 ft	32.7 km 20.3 mi	33.8147°N; 116.6794°W
2	San Gorgonio Mountain	California	San Bernardino Mountains	3506 m 11,503 ft	2528 m 8,294 ft	262 km 162.5 mi	34.0992°N; 116.8249°W
3	Mount San Antonio	California	San Gabriel Mountains	3069 m 10,068 ft	1903 m 6,244 ft	68.4 km 42.5 mi	34.2892°N; 117.6464°W

=== Intermontane Plateaus ===
The 21 mountain peak of the Intermontane Plateaus with at least 1500 meters of topographic prominence
Rank	Mountain Peak	Region	Mountain Range	Elevation	Prominence	Isolation	Location
1	Charleston Peak (Mount Charleston)	Nevada	Spring Mountains	3632 m 11,916 ft	2517 m 8,257 ft	218 km 135.1 mi	36.2716°N; 115.6956°W
2	Wheeler Peak	Nevada	Snake Range	3982 m 13,065 ft	2307 m 7,568 ft	373 km 232 mi	38.9858°N; 114.3139°W
3	White Mountain Peak	California	White Mountains	4344 m 14,252 ft	2193 m 7,196 ft	108.6 km 67.4 mi	37.6341°N; 118.2557°W
4	Sacajawea Peak (Oregon)	Oregon	Wallowa Mountains	3000 m 9,843 ft	1944 m 6,377 ft	202 km 125.5 mi	45.2450°N; 117.2929°W
5	Mount Graham	Arizona	Pinaleño Mountains	3269 m 10,724 ft	1932 m 6,340 ft	132.7 km 82.5 mi	32.7017°N; 109.8714°W
6	Telescope Peak	California	Panamint Range	3366 m 11,043 ft	1886 m 6,188 ft	92 km 57.2 mi	36.1698°N; 117.0892°W
7	Humphreys Peak	Arizona	San Francisco Peaks	3852 m 12,637 ft	1841 m 6,039 ft	396 km 246 mi	35.3463°N; 111.6779°W
8	Mount Jefferson	Nevada	Toquima Range	3642 m 11,949 ft	1789 m 5,869 ft	158.7 km 98.6 mi	38.7520°N; 116.9268°W
9	Deseret Peak	Utah	Stansbury Mountains	3364 m 11,035 ft	1772 m 5,812 ft	74.2 km 46.1 mi	40.4595°N; 112.6263°W
10	Mount Wrightson	Arizona	Santa Rita Mountains	2881 m 9,452 ft	1754 m 5,755 ft	81 km 50.3 mi	31.4144°N; 110.5055°W
11	Pilot Peak	Nevada	Pilot Range	3268 m 10,720 ft	1747 m 5,731 ft	88.3 km 54.9 mi	41.0211°N; 114.0774°W
12	Sierra Blanca Peak	New Mexico	Sierra Blanca	3652 m 11,981 ft	1693 m 5,553 ft	267 km 166.2 mi	33.3743°N; 105.8087°W
13	North Schell Peak	Nevada	Schell Creek Range	3624 m 11,888 ft	1650 m 5,413 ft	37.9 km 23.5 mi	39.4132°N; 114.5997°W
14	Hayford Peak	Nevada	Sheep Range	3025 m 9,924 ft	1650 m 5,412 ft	55.8 km 34.7 mi	36.6577°N; 115.2008°W
15	Star Peak	Nevada	Humboldt Range	2999 m 9,840 ft	1646 m 5,400 ft	111.2 km 69.1 mi	40.5224°N; 118.1708°W
16	Flat Top Mountain	Utah	Oquirrh Mountains	3238 m 10,624 ft	1640 m 5,382 ft	38.4 km 23.8 mi	40.3724°N; 112.1888°W
17	Ibapah Peak	Utah	Deep Creek Range	3686 m 12,093 ft	1605 m 5,267 ft	98.7 km 61.3 mi	39.8282°N; 113.9198°W
18	Arc Dome	Nevada	Toiyabe Range	3591 m 11,781 ft	1595 m 5,233 ft	37.2 km 23.1 mi	38.8327°N; 117.3530°W
19	Mount Lemmon	Arizona	Santa Catalina Mountains	2792 m 9,159 ft	1578 m 5,177 ft	82.9 km 51.5 mi	32.4430°N; 110.7885°W
20	Chiricahua Peak	Arizona	Chiricahua Mountains	2976 m 9,763 ft	1569 m 5,149 ft	103.5 km 64.3 mi	31.8465°N; 109.2910°W
21	Miller Peak	Arizona	Huachuca Mountains	2886 m 9,470 ft	1527 m 5,011 ft	107.6 km 66.8 mi	31.3928°N; 110.2930°W

=== US Rocky Mountains ===
The 17 mountain peaks of the Rocky Mountains of the United States with at least 1500 meters of topographic prominence
Rank	Mountain Peak	Region	Mountain Range	Elevation	Prominence	Isolation	Location
1	Mount Elbert	Colorado	Sawatch Range	4401 m 14,440 ft	2772 m 9,093 ft	1,079 km 671 mi	39.1178°N; 106.4454°W
2	Cloud Peak	Wyoming	Bighorn Mountains	4013 m 13,167 ft	2157 m 7,077 ft	233 km 145 mi	44.3821°N; 107.1739°W
3	Gannett Peak	Wyoming	Wind River Range	4209 m 13,809 ft	2157 m 7,076 ft	467 km 290 mi	43.1842°N; 109.6542°W
4	Grand Teton	Wyoming	Teton Range	4199 m 13,775 ft	1995 m 6,545 ft	111.6 km 69.4 mi	43.7412°N; 110.8024°W
5	Kings Peak	Utah	Uinta Mountains	4120 m 13,518 ft	1938 m 6,358 ft	268 km 166.6 mi	40.7659°N; 110.3779°W
6	Mount Peale	Utah	La Sal Mountains	3879 m 12,726 ft	1884 m 6,181 ft	117.8 km 73.2 mi	38.4385°N; 109.2292°W
7	Borah Peak	Idaho	Lost River Range	3861 m 12,668 ft	1829 m 6,002 ft	243 km 150.8 mi	44.1374°N; 113.7811°W
8	Mount Ellen	Utah	Henry Mountains	3513 m 11,527 ft	1787 m 5,862 ft	90.2 km 56 mi	38.1089°N; 110.8136°W
9	Crazy Peak	Montana	Crazy Mountains	3418 m 11,214 ft	1743 m 5,719 ft	71.8 km 44.6 mi	46.0182°N; 110.2766°W
10	McDonald Peak	Montana	Mission Mountains	2994 m 9,824 ft	1722 m 5,650 ft	127.9 km 79.5 mi	47.3826°N; 113.9191°W
11	Pikes Peak	Colorado	Pikes Peak Massif	4302 m 14,115 ft	1686 m 5,530 ft	97.8 km 60.8 mi	38.8405°N; 105.0442°W
12	Mount Nebo	Utah	Wasatch Range	3637 m 11,933 ft	1679 m 5,508 ft	121.7 km 75.6 mi	39.8219°N; 111.7603°W
13	Snowshoe Peak	Montana	Cabinet Mountains	2665 m 8,742 ft	1658 m 5,441 ft	133.7 km 83.1 mi	48.2231°N; 115.6890°W
14	Diamond Peak	Idaho	Lemhi Range	3719 m 12,202 ft	1642 m 5,387 ft	51.2 km 31.8 mi	44.1414°N; 113.0827°W
15	Blanca Peak	Colorado	Sangre de Cristo Range	4374 m 14,351 ft	1623 m 5,326 ft	166.4 km 103.4 mi	37.5775°N; 105.4857°W
16	Mount Timpanogos	Utah	Wasatch Range	3582 m 11,752 ft	1609 m 5,279 ft	63.9 km 39.7 mi	40.3908°N; 111.6459°W
17	Mount Cleveland	Montana	Canadian Rockies	3194 m 10,479 ft	1599 m 5,246 ft	159.9 km 99.4 mi	48.9249°N; 113.8482°W

=== Appalachian Mountains ===
The 2 mountain peaks of the Appalachian Mountains with at least 1500 meters of topographic prominence
Rank	Mountain Peak	Region	Mountain Range	Elevation	Prominence	Isolation	Location
1	Mount Washington	New Hampshire	White Mountains	1917 m 6,288 ft	1877 m 6,158 ft	1,319 km 820 mi	44.2705°N; 71.3032°W
2	Mount Mitchell	North Carolina	Blue Ridge Mountains	2037 m 6,684 ft	1857 m 6,091 ft	1,913 km 1,189 mi	35.7650°N; 82.2652°W

=== Mexico ===
The 26 mountain peaks of Mexico with at least 1500 meters of topographic prominence
Rank	Mountain Peak	Region	Mountain Range	Elevation	Prominence	Isolation	Location
1	Volcán Citlaltépetl (Pico de Orizaba)	Puebla; Veracruz	Cordillera Neovolcanica	5636 m 18,491 ft	4922 m 16,148 ft	2,690 km 1,672 mi	19.0305°N; 97.2698°W
2	Volcán Popocatépetl	México; Morelos; Puebla	Cordillera Neovolcanica	5410 m 17,749 ft	3040 m 9,974 ft	143 km 88.8 mi	19.0225°N; 98.6278°W
3	Nevado de Colima	Jalisco	Cordillera Neovolcanica	4270 m 14,009 ft	2720 m 8,924 ft	407 km 253 mi	19.5629°N; 103.6083°W
4	Nevado de Toluca (Volcán Xinantécatl)	México	Cordillera Neovolcanica	4690 m 15,387 ft	2225 m 7,300 ft	118.4 km 73.6 mi	19.1020°N; 99.7676°W
5	Cerro Tiotepec (Cerro Teotepec)	Guerrero	Sierra Madre del Sur	3550 m 11,647 ft	2180 m 7,152 ft	185 km 115 mi	17.4667°N; 100.1333°W
6	Cerro El Nacimiento (Cerro Nube Flane)	Oaxaca	Sierra Madre del Sur	3710 m 12,172 ft	2140 m 7,021 ft	1.58 km 0.98 mi	16.2113°N; 96.1967°W
7	Picacho del Diablo	Baja California	Sierra de San Pedro Mártir	3110 m 10,203 ft	2140 m 7,021 ft	334 km 208 mi	30.9928°N; 115.3752°W
8	Cerro Las Conchas	Michoacán	Michoacán	2890 m 9,482 ft	1960 m 6,430 ft	104.5 km 65 mi	18.7167°N; 102.9667°W
9	Volcán Matlalcuéyetl (La Malinche)	Puebla; Tlaxcala	Cordillera Neovolcanica	4430 m 14,534 ft	1940 m 6,365 ft	63.5 km 39.5 mi	19.2500°N; 98.0333°W
10	Sierra La Laguna High Point	Baja California Sur	Sierra La Laguna	2090 m 6,857 ft	1920 m 6,299 ft	342 km 213 mi	23.5399°N; 109.9543°W
11	Sierra La Madera	Coahuila	Mexican Plateau	3030 m 9,941 ft	1905 m 6,250 ft	227 km 140.9 mi	27.0333°N; 102.4000°W
12	Sierra de Minas Viejas	Nuevo León	Sierra Madre Oriental	2630 m 8,629 ft	1885 m 6,184 ft	55 km 34.2 mi	26.1198°N; 100.5569°W
13	Cerro El Potosí	Nuevo León	Sierra Madre Oriental	3720 m 12,205 ft	1875 m 6,152 ft	570 km 354 mi	24.8719°N; 100.2327°W
14	Cerro La Joya	Querétaro	Sierra Madre Oriental	2920 m 9,580 ft	1870 m 6,135 ft	65.6 km 40.8 mi	21.4333°N; 99.1333°W
15	Volcán Tancítaro	Michoacán	Cordillera Neovolcanica	3840 m 12,598 ft	1665 m 5,463 ft	137.9 km 85.7 mi	19.4167°N; 102.3000°W
16	Picacho San Onofre (Sierra Peña Nevada)	Nuevo León	Sierra Madre Oriental	3540 m 11,614 ft	1640 m 5,381 ft	125 km 77.6 mi	23.8006°N; 99.8466°W
17	Cerro El Centinela	Coahuila	Mexican Plateau	3120 m 10,236 ft	1640 m 5,381 ft	186.6 km 115.9 mi	25.1333°N; 103.2333°W
18	El Aguacate Oeste	Oaxaca	Sierra Madre del Sur	2820 m 9,252 ft	1640 m 5,381 ft	57.4 km 35.6 mi	16.5833°N; 95.8000°W
19	Volcán Las Tres Vírgenes	Baja California Sur	Tres Virgenes	1950 m 6,398 ft	1625 m 5,331 ft	340 km 211 mi	27.4712°N; 112.5900°W
20	Sierra de Santa Martha	Veracruz	Cordillera Neovolcanica	1690 m 5,545 ft	1620 m 5,315 ft	179.3 km 111.4 mi	18.3833°N; 94.8667°W
21	Cerro Las Capillas	Jalisco	Jalisco	2890 m 9,482 ft	1590 m 5,217 ft	56 km 34.8 mi	19.5500°N; 104.1500°W
22	Sierra del Fraile	Nuevo León	Sierra Madre Oriental	2390 m 7,841 ft	1590 m 5,217 ft	26.3 km 16.37 mi	25.8652°N; 100.6089°W
23	Cerro Zempoaltepetl	Oaxaca	Sierra Madre de Oaxaca	3420 m 11,220 ft	1580 m 5,184 ft	107.5 km 66.8 mi	17.1667°N; 95.9833°W
24	Volcán Iztaccíhuatl	México; Puebla	Cordillera Neovolcanica	5230 m 17,159 ft	1560 m 5,118 ft	17.41 km 10.82 mi	19.1792°N; 98.6419°W
25	Volcán de Tequila	Jalisco	Jalisco	2930 m 9,613 ft	1530 m 5,020 ft	63.4 km 39.4 mi	20.7833°N; 103.8500°W
26	Cerro Atravesado (Sierra el Cerro Azul)	Oaxaca	Oaxaca	2310 m 7,579 ft	1510 m 4,954 ft	108.9 km 67.6 mi	16.7667°N; 94.4500°W

=== Central America ===
The 23 mountain peaks of Central America with at least 1500 meters of topographic prominence
Rank	Mountain Peak	Region	Mountain Range	Elevation	Prominence	Isolation	Location
1	Volcán Tajumulco	Guatemala	Sierra Madre de Chiapas	4220 m 13,845 ft	3980 m 13,058 ft	722 km 448 mi	15.0445°N; 91.9035°W
2	Chirripó Grande (Cerro Chirripó)	Costa Rica	Cordillera de Talamanca	3819 m 12,530 ft	3726 m 12,224 ft	864 km 537 mi	09.4841°N; 83.4887°W
3	Montaña de Santa Bárbara	Honduras	Santa Bárbara	2744 m 9,003 ft	2084 m 6,837 ft	73.8 km 45.9 mi	14.9167°N; 88.1167°W
4	Cerro Las Minas	Honduras	Lempira	2849 m 9,347 ft	2069 m 6,788 ft	129.9 km 80.7 mi	14.5333°N; 88.6833°W
5	Volcán de Agua	Guatemala	Sierra Madre de Chiapas	3761 m 12,339 ft	1981 m 6,499 ft	15.68 km 9.74 mi	14.4667°N; 90.7333°W
6	Alto Cuchumatanes	Guatemala	Sierra de los Cuchumatanes	3837 m 12,589 ft	1877 m 6,158 ft	65.1 km 40.5 mi	15.5167°N; 91.5333°W
7	Volcán Irazú	Costa Rica	Cordillera Central, Costa Rica	3402 m 11,161 ft	1872 m 6,142 ft	47.9 km 29.8 mi	09.9770°N; 83.8541°W
8	Montañas Peña Blanca	Guatemala	Sierra Madre de Chiapas	3518 m 11,542 ft	1858 m 6,096 ft	42.1 km 26.1 mi	15.5000°N; 91.9167°W
9	Volcán Acatenango	Guatemala	Sierra Madre de Chiapas	3975 m 13,041 ft	1835 m 6,020 ft	125.8 km 78.2 mi	14.5000°N; 90.8667°W
10	Volcán San Miguel	El Salvador	Sierra Madre de Chiapas	2131 m 6,991 ft	1831 m 6,007 ft	63.8 km 39.6 mi	13.4333°N; 88.2667°W
11	Cerro Tacarcuna	Panama	Darién	1875 m 6,152 ft	1770 m 5,807 ft	98.6 km 61.3 mi	08.1667°N; 77.3000°W
12	Volcán Atitlán	Guatemala	Sierra Madre de Chiapas	3537 m 11,604 ft	1754 m 5,755 ft	34.6 km 21.5 mi	14.5833°N; 91.1833°W
13	Pico Bonito	Honduras	Cordillera Nombre de Dios	2450 m 8,038 ft	1710 m 5,610 ft	152.2 km 94.6 mi	15.5667°N; 86.8667°W
14	Montaña San Ildefonso	Honduras	Cortés	2242 m 7,356 ft	1702 m 5,584 ft	68.4 km 42.5 mi	15.5167°N; 88.2333°W
15	Volcán San Cristóbal	Nicaragua	Cordillera Los Maribios	1745 m 5,725 ft	1665 m 5,463 ft	134.2 km 83.4 mi	12.7000°N; 87.0167°W
16	Volcán de Santa Ana	El Salvador	Sierra Madre de Chiapas	2362 m 7,749 ft	1602 m 5,256 ft	70.1 km 43.6 mi	13.8500°N; 89.6333°W
17	Volcán Concepción	Nicaragua	Rivas	1610 m 5,282 ft	1579 m 5,180 ft	69.6 km 43.2 mi	11.5333°N; 85.6167°W
18	Pico Pijol	Honduras	Yoro	2320 m 7,612 ft	1578 m 5,177 ft	66 km 41 mi	15.1833°N; 87.5667°W
19	Volcán de San Vicente	El Salvador	Sierra Madre de Chiapas	2182 m 7,159 ft	1562 m 5,125 ft	90.5 km 56.2 mi	13.6000°N; 88.8333°W
20	Cerro El Pital	El Salvador; Honduras	Sierra Madre de Chiapas	2730 m 8,957 ft	1530 m 5,020 ft	49.1 km 30.5 mi	14.3833°N; 89.1167°W
21	Volcán Miravalles	Costa Rica	Cordillera de Guanacaste	2028 m 6,654 ft	1528 m 5,013 ft	102.7 km 63.8 mi	10.7333°N; 85.1333°W
22	Montaña los Comayagua	Honduras	Comayagua	2407 m 7,897 ft	1507 m 4,944 ft	80.9 km 50.3 mi	14.5000°N; 87.5000°W
23	Sierra de Agalta High Point	Honduras	Sierra de Agalta	2335 m 7,661 ft	1505 m 4,938 ft	122.7 km 76.2 mi	14.9500°N; 85.9167°W

=== Caribbean ===
The 7 mountain peaks of the Islands of the Caribbean Sea with at least 1500 meters of topographic prominence
Rank	Mountain Peak	Region	Mountain Range	Elevation	Prominence	Isolation	Location
1	Pico Duarte	Dominican Republic	Cordillera Central	3098 m 10,164 ft	3098 m 10,164 ft	941 km 584 mi	19.0230°N; 70.9981°W
2	Pic la Selle	Haiti	Chaîne de la Selle	2680 m 8,793 ft	2650 m 8,694 ft	126.6 km 78.7 mi	18.3601°N; 71.9764°W
3	Blue Mountain Peak	Jamaica	Blue Mountains	2256 m 7,402 ft	2256 m 7,402 ft	273 km 169.4 mi	18.0465°N; 76.5788°W
4	Pic Macaya	Haiti	Massif de la Hotte	2347 m 7,700 ft	2087 m 6,847 ft	217 km 134.6 mi	18.3830°N; 74.0256°W
5	Pico Turquino	Cuba	Sierra Maestra	1974 m 6,476 ft	1974 m 6,476 ft	217 km 134.7 mi	19.9898°N; 76.8360°W
6	Loma Gajo en Medio	Dominican Republic	Sierra de Neiba	2279 m 7,477 ft	1779 m 5,837 ft	56.9 km 35.3 mi	18.6358°N; 71.5219°W
7	Loma Alto de la Bandera	Dominican Republic	Cordillera Central	2842 m 9,324 ft	1502 m 4,928 ft	43.4 km 27 mi	18.8123°N; 70.6267°W

== Gallery ==
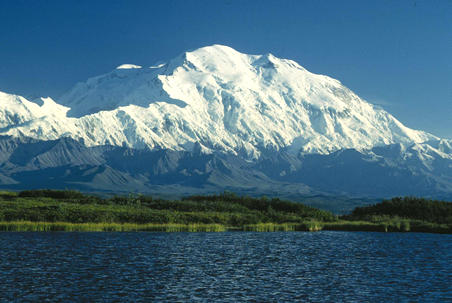
1. Denali (also known as Mount McKinley) in Alaska is the highest summit of the United States and North America.

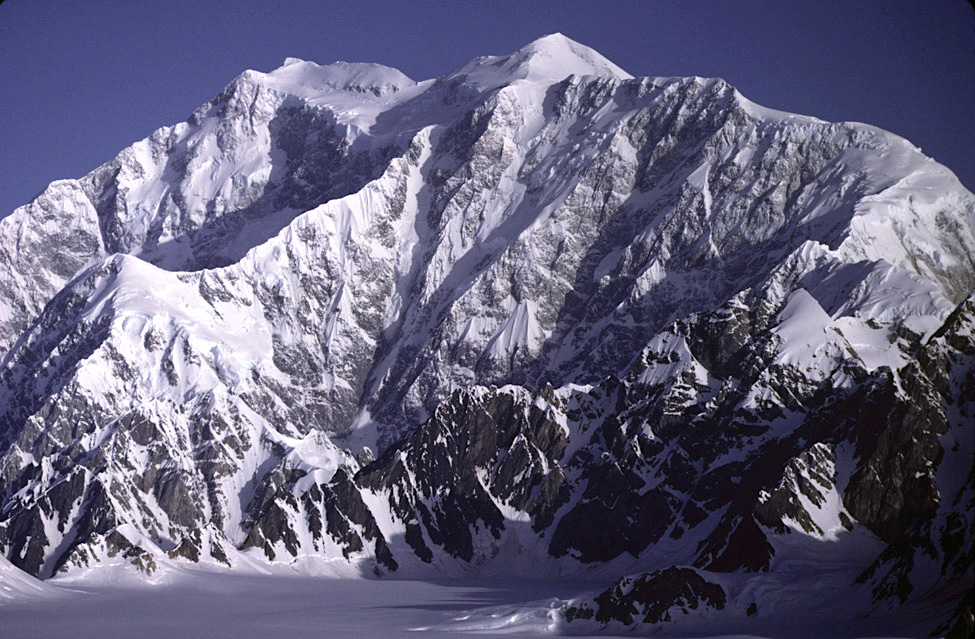
2. Mount Logan in Yukon is the highest summit of Canada.

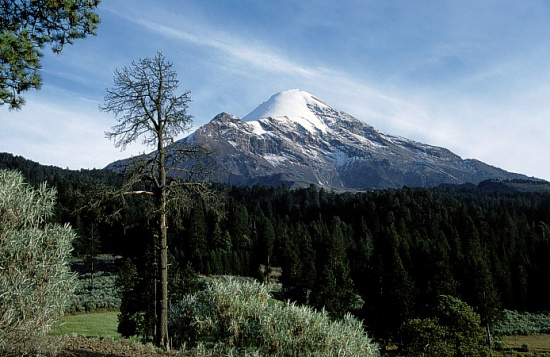
3. Pico de Orizaba is the highest summit of México.

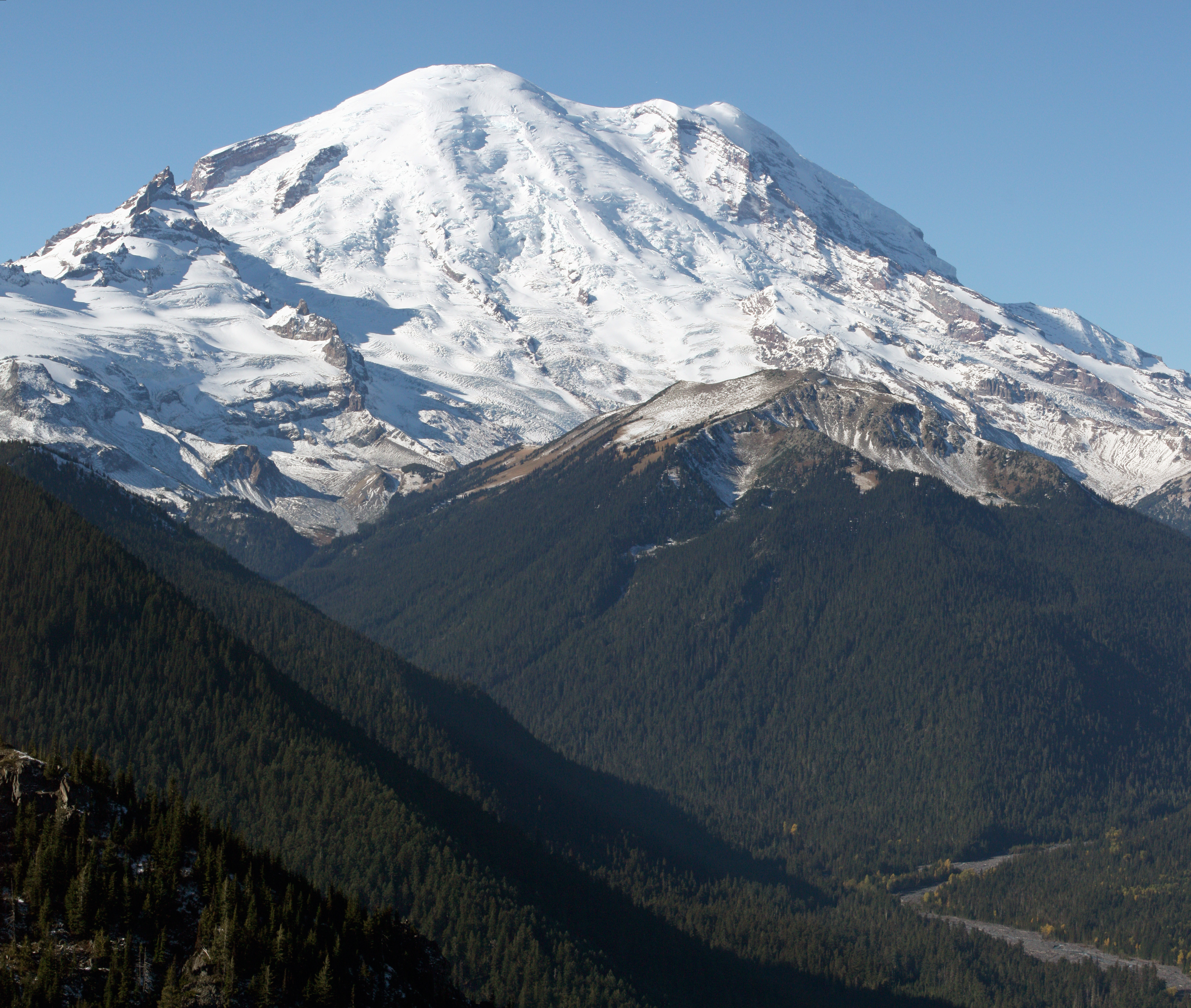
4. Mount Rainier is the highest summit of Washington and the Cascade Range.

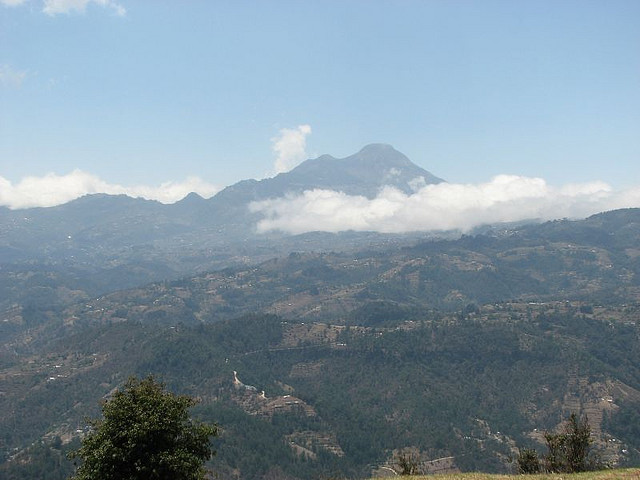
5. Volcán Tajumulco is the highest summit in Guatemala and all of Central America.

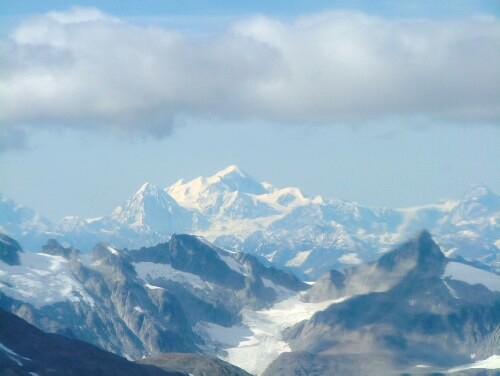
6. Mount Fairweather on the Alaska border is the highest summit of British Columbia.

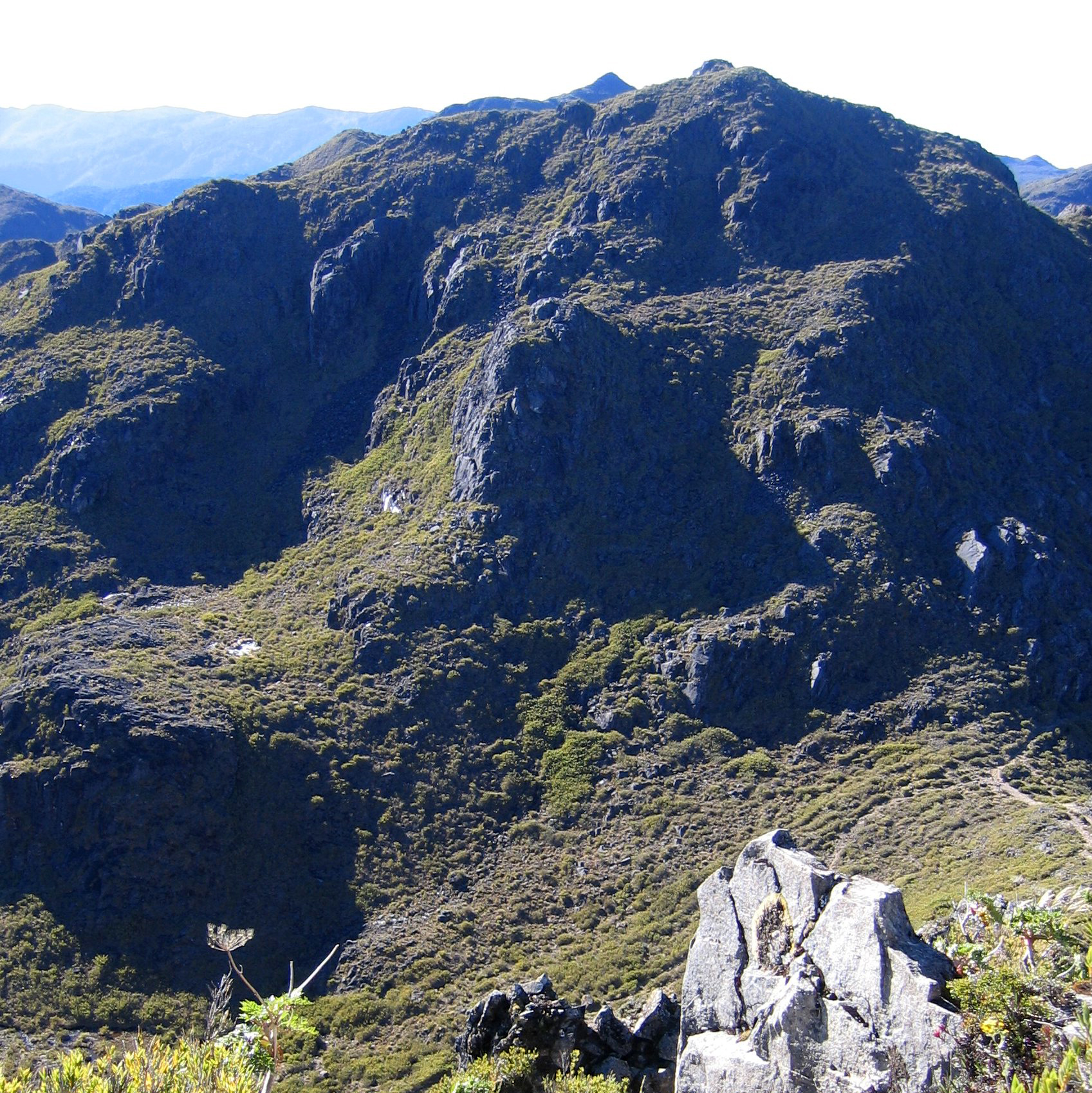
7. Chirripó Grande is the highest summit of Costa Rica.

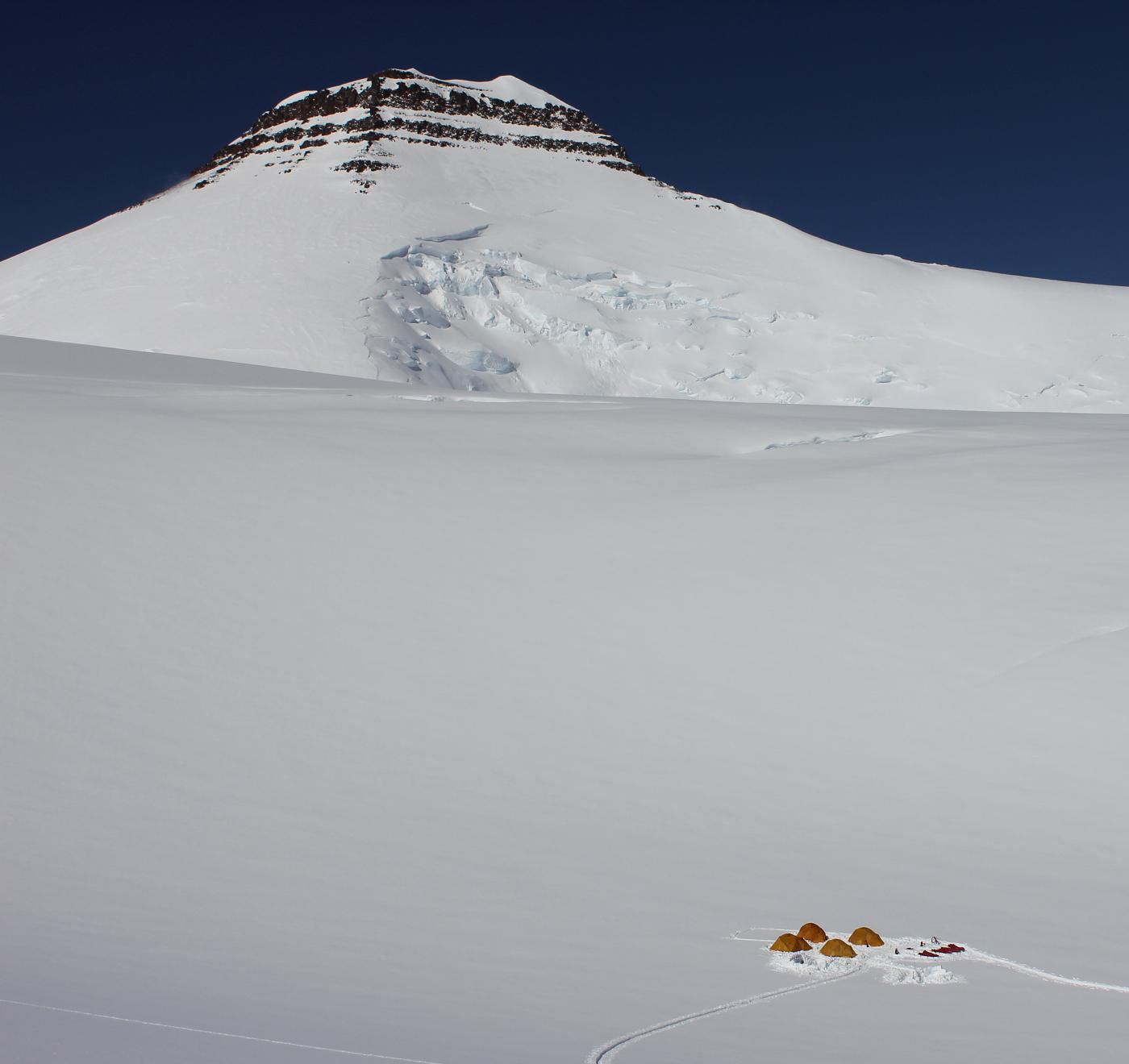
8. Gunnbjørn Fjeld is the highest summit of Greenland and all of the Arctic.

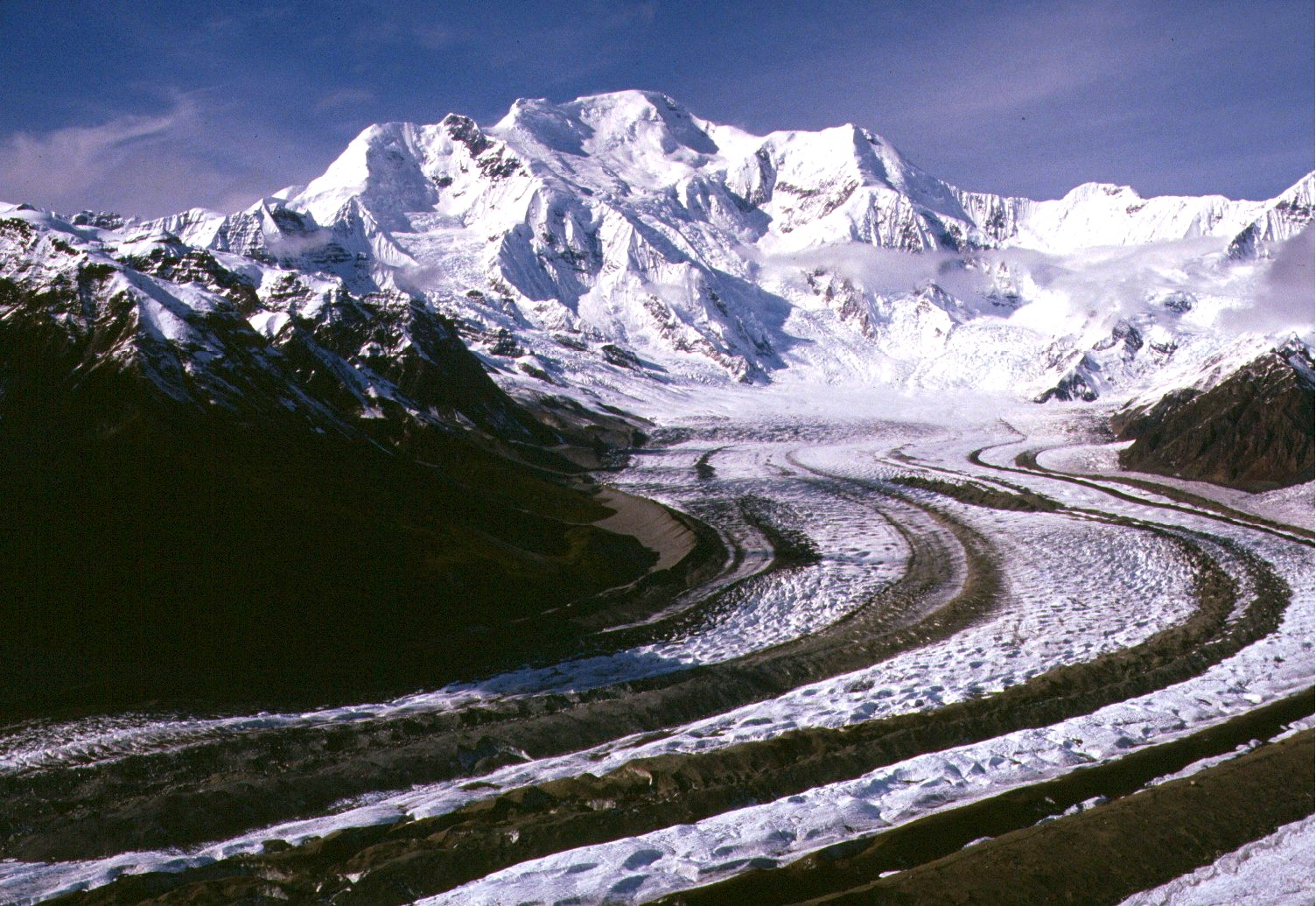
9. Mount Blackburn in Alaska is the highest summit of the Wrangell Mountains.

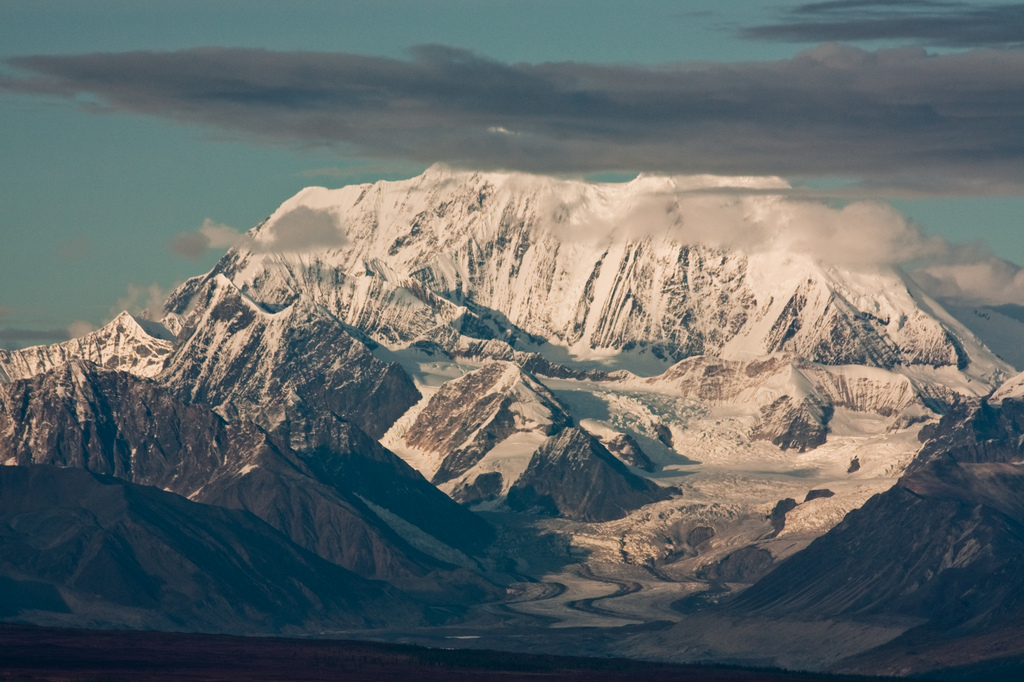
10. Mount Hayes is the highest summit of the eastern Alaska Range.

11. Mount Saint Elias is the second highest summit of both Canada and the United States.

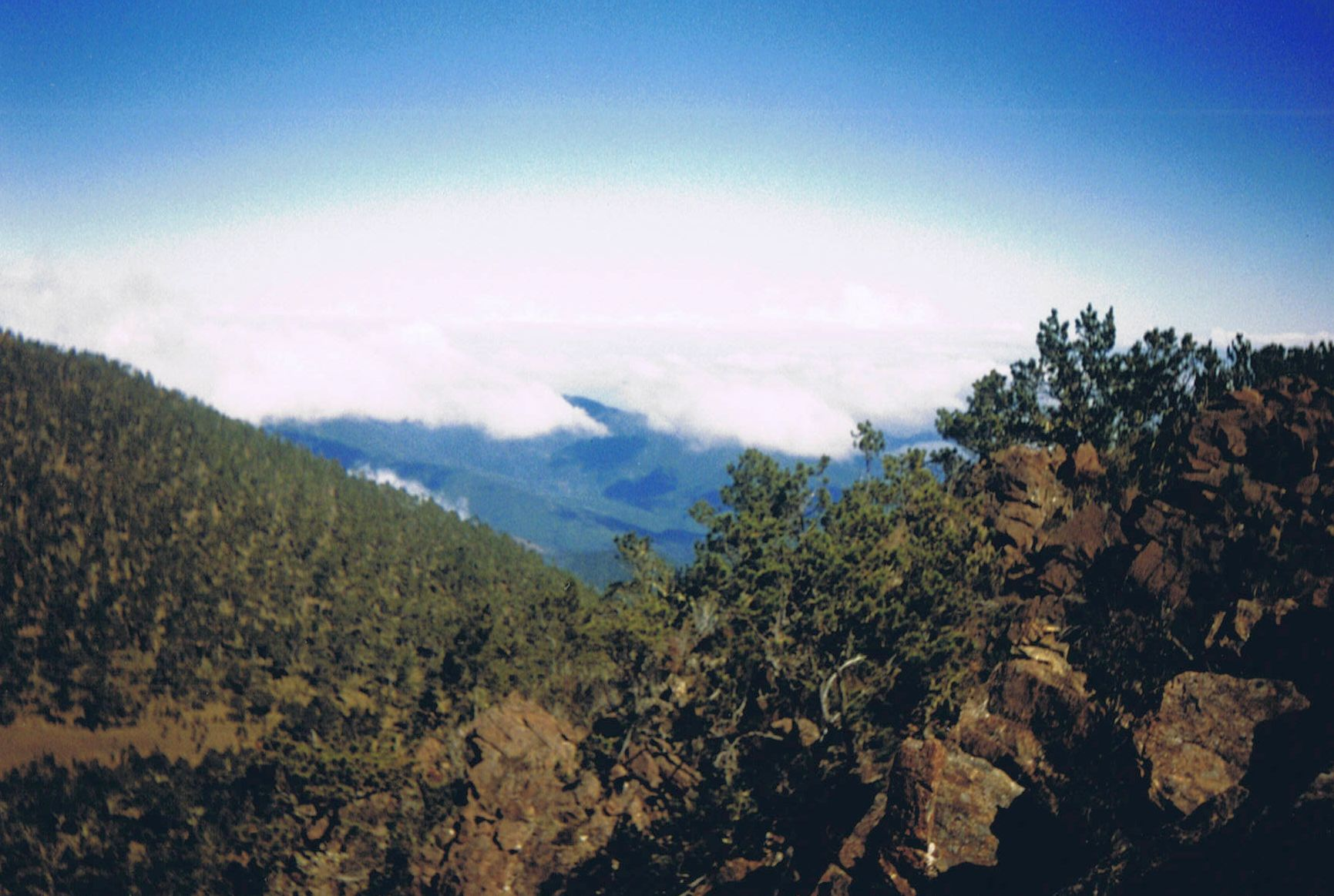
14. Pico Duarte in the Dominican Republic on Hispaniola is the highest summit in the Caribbean.

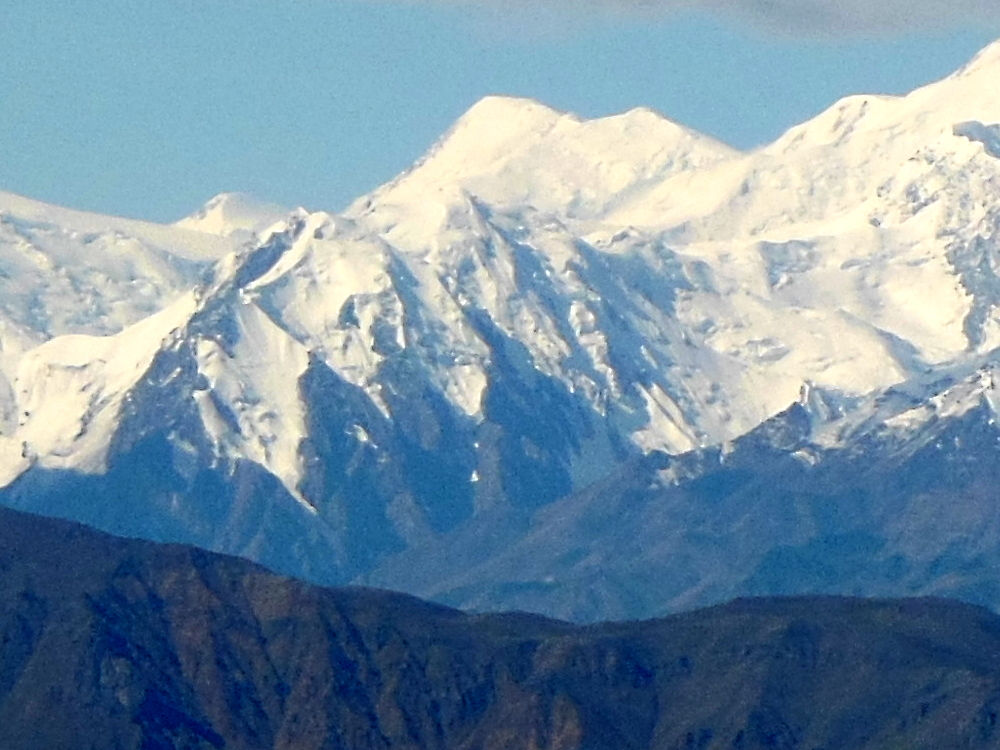
15. Mount Lucania in Yukon is the highest summit of the northern Saint Elias Mountains.

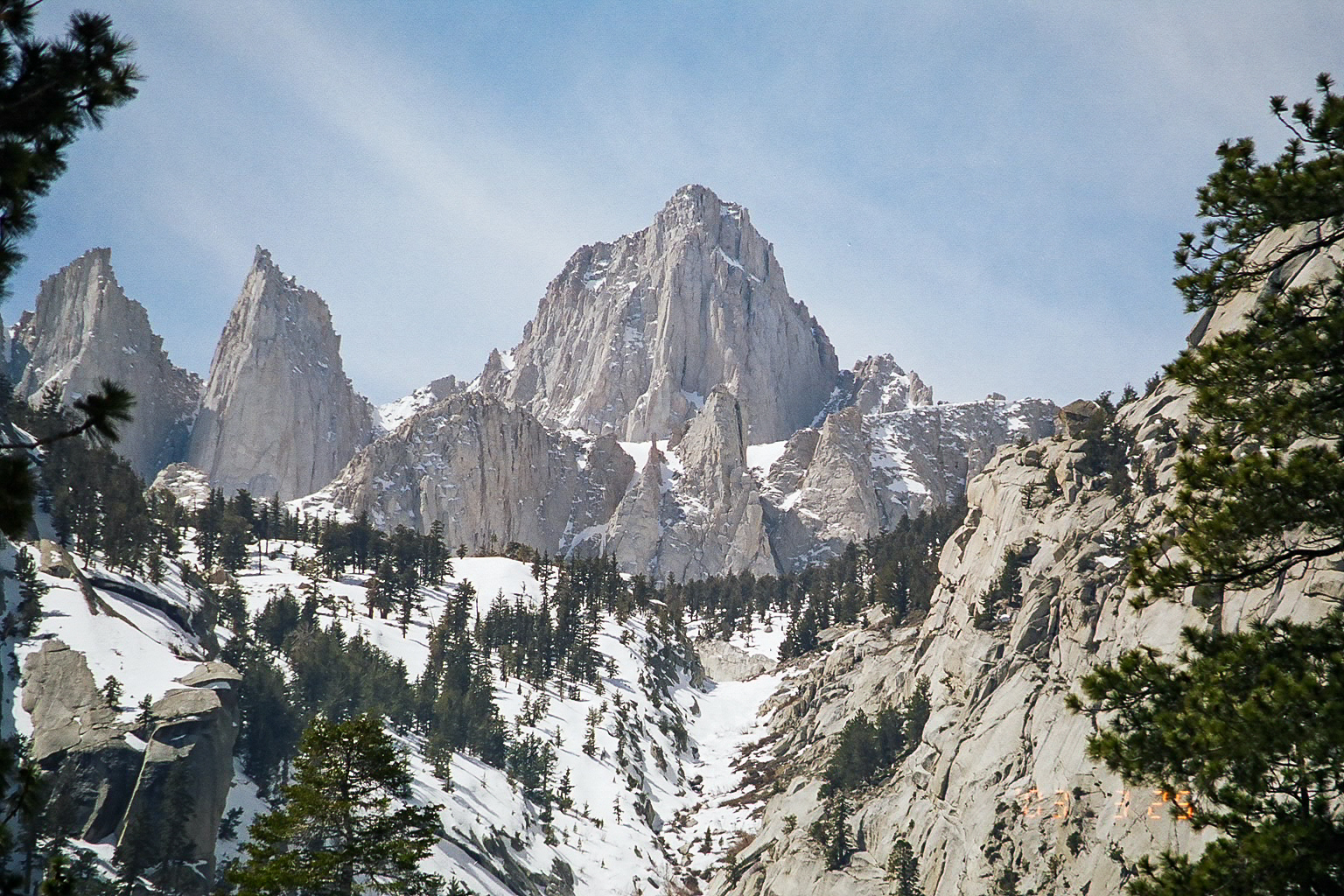
16. Mount Whitney highest summit of the Sierra Nevada and California.

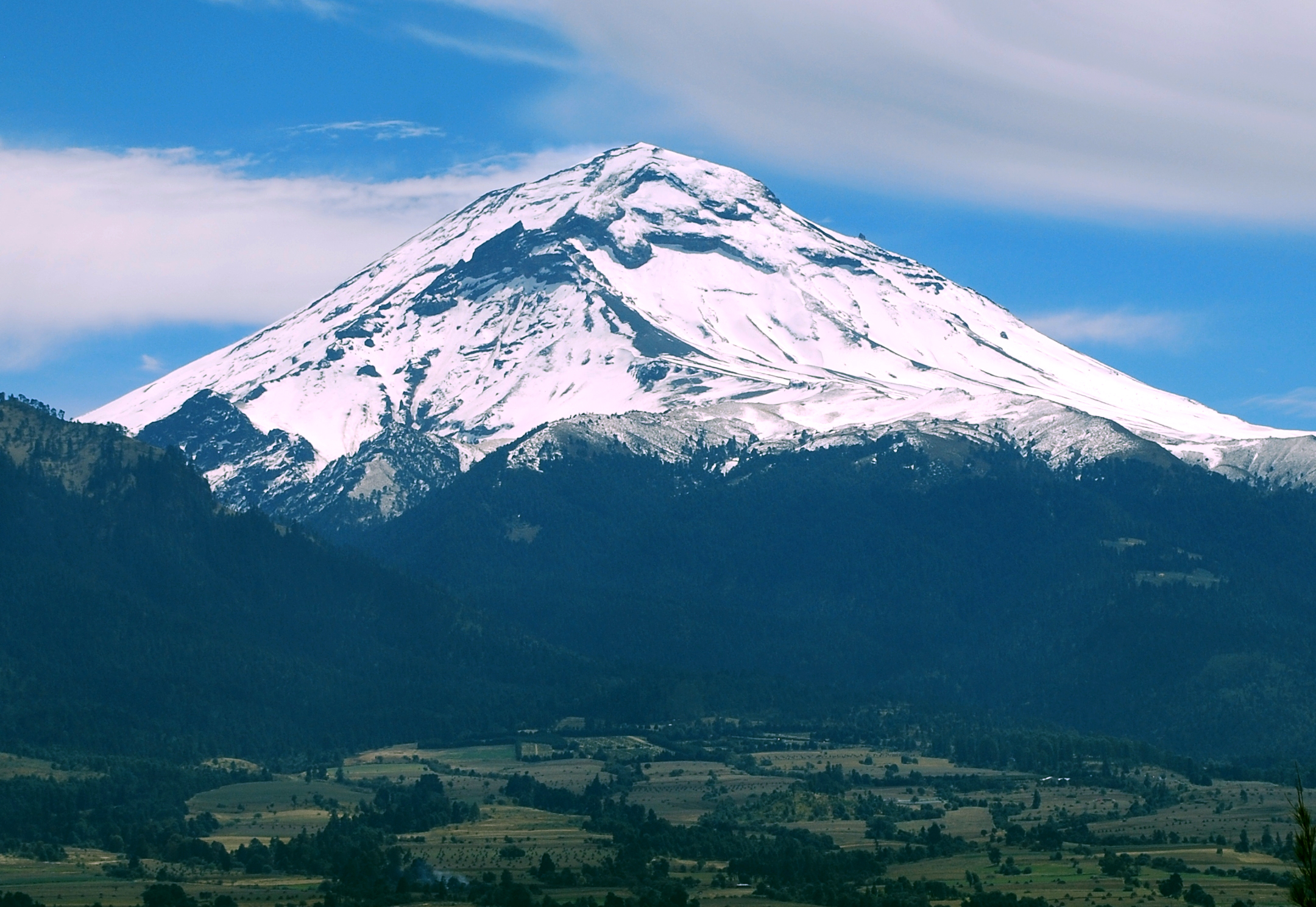
17. Popocatépetl is the second highest summit of México.

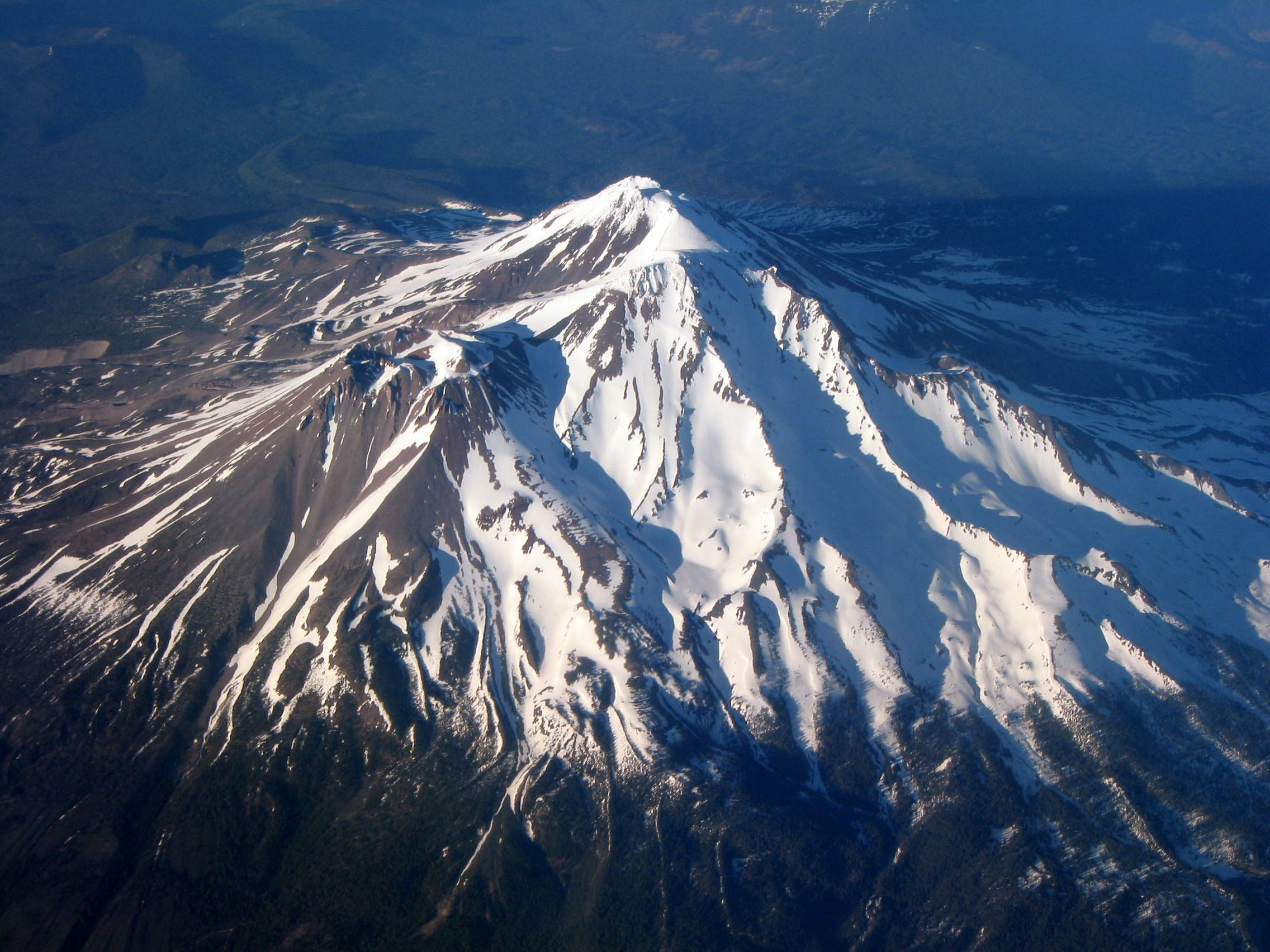
18. Mount Shasta in California is the highest summit of the southern Cascade Range.

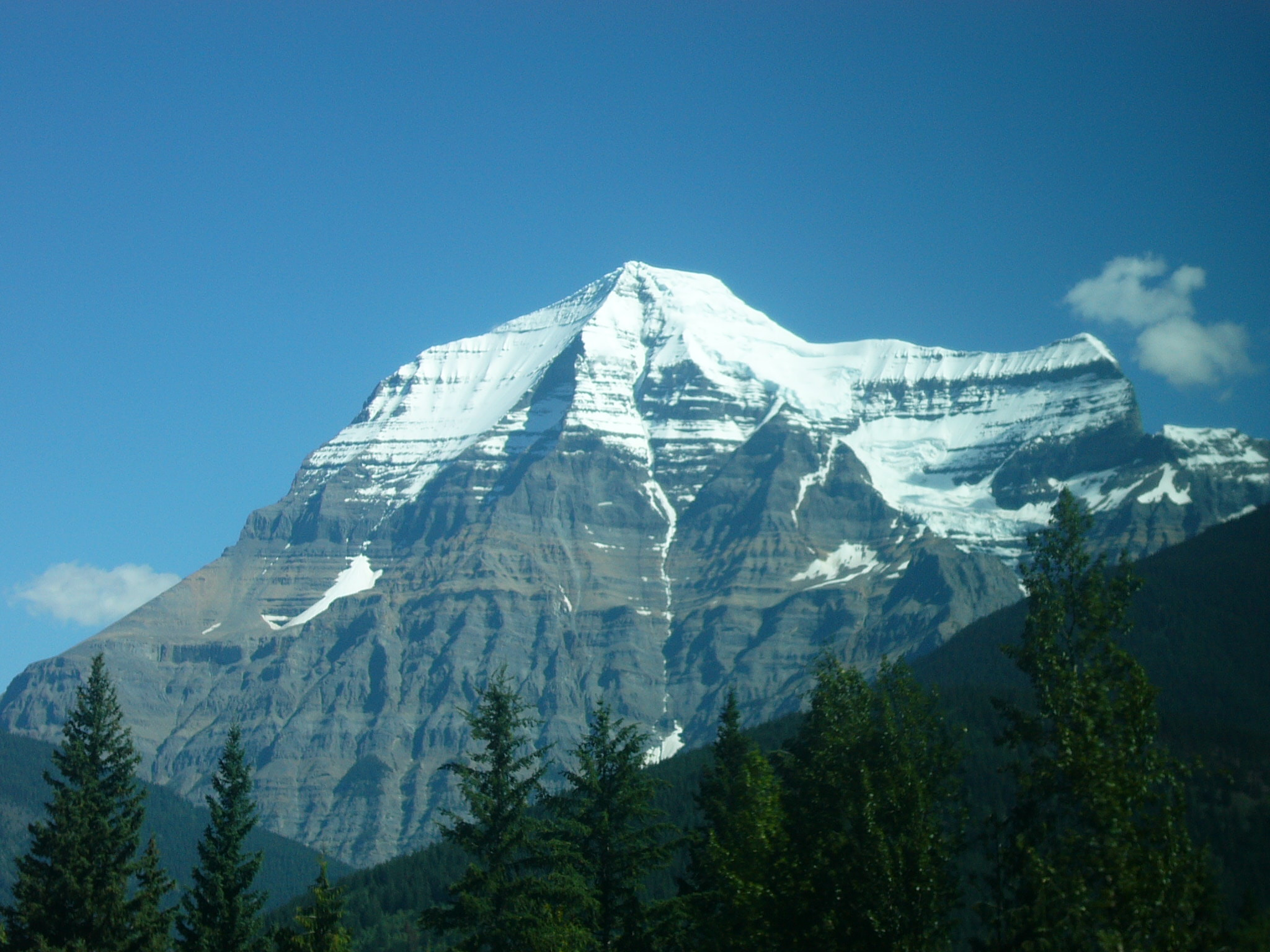
21. Mount Robson in British Columbia is the highest summit of the Canadian Rockies.

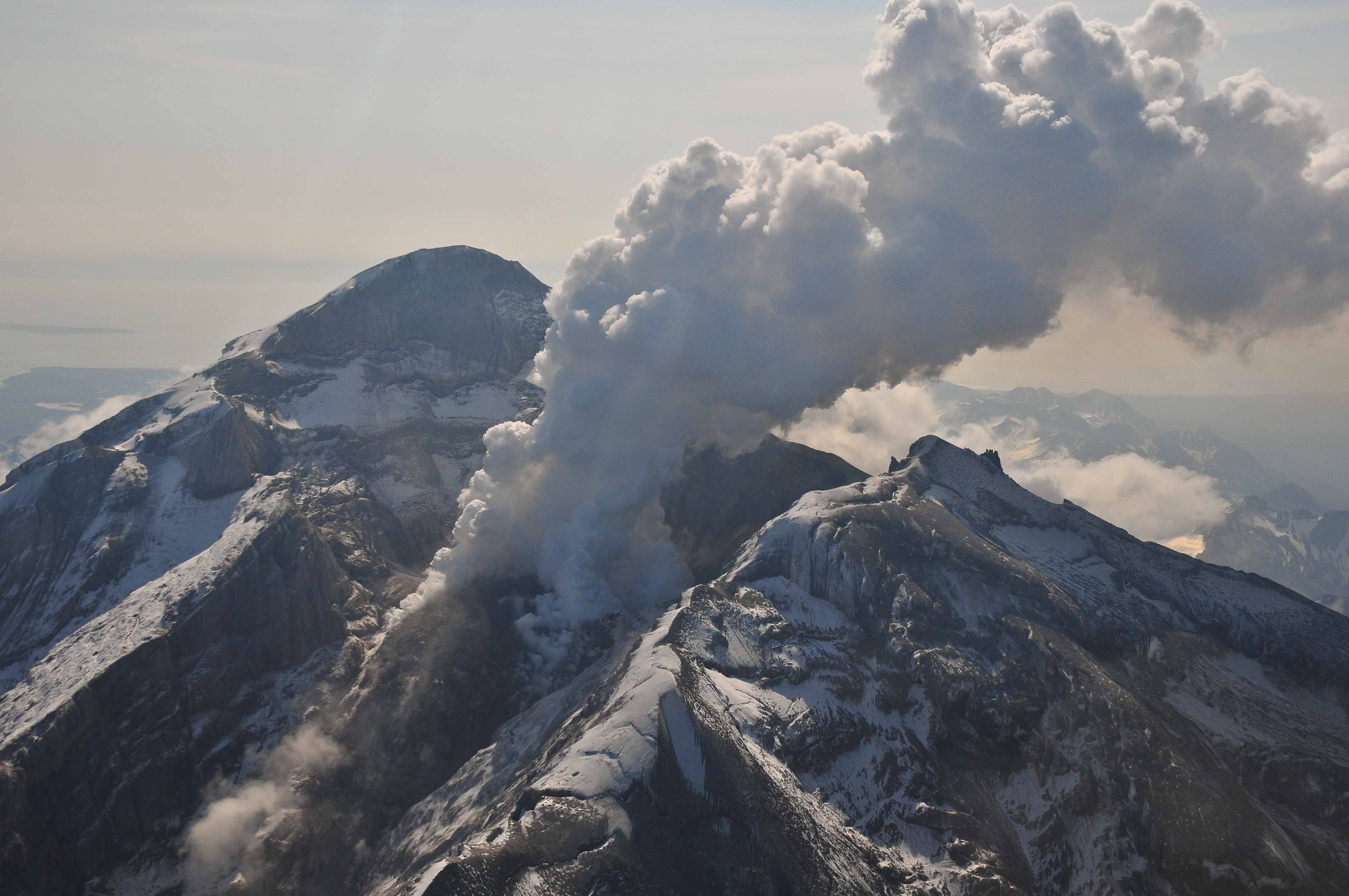
22. Redoubt Volcano is the highest summit of the Aleutian Range.

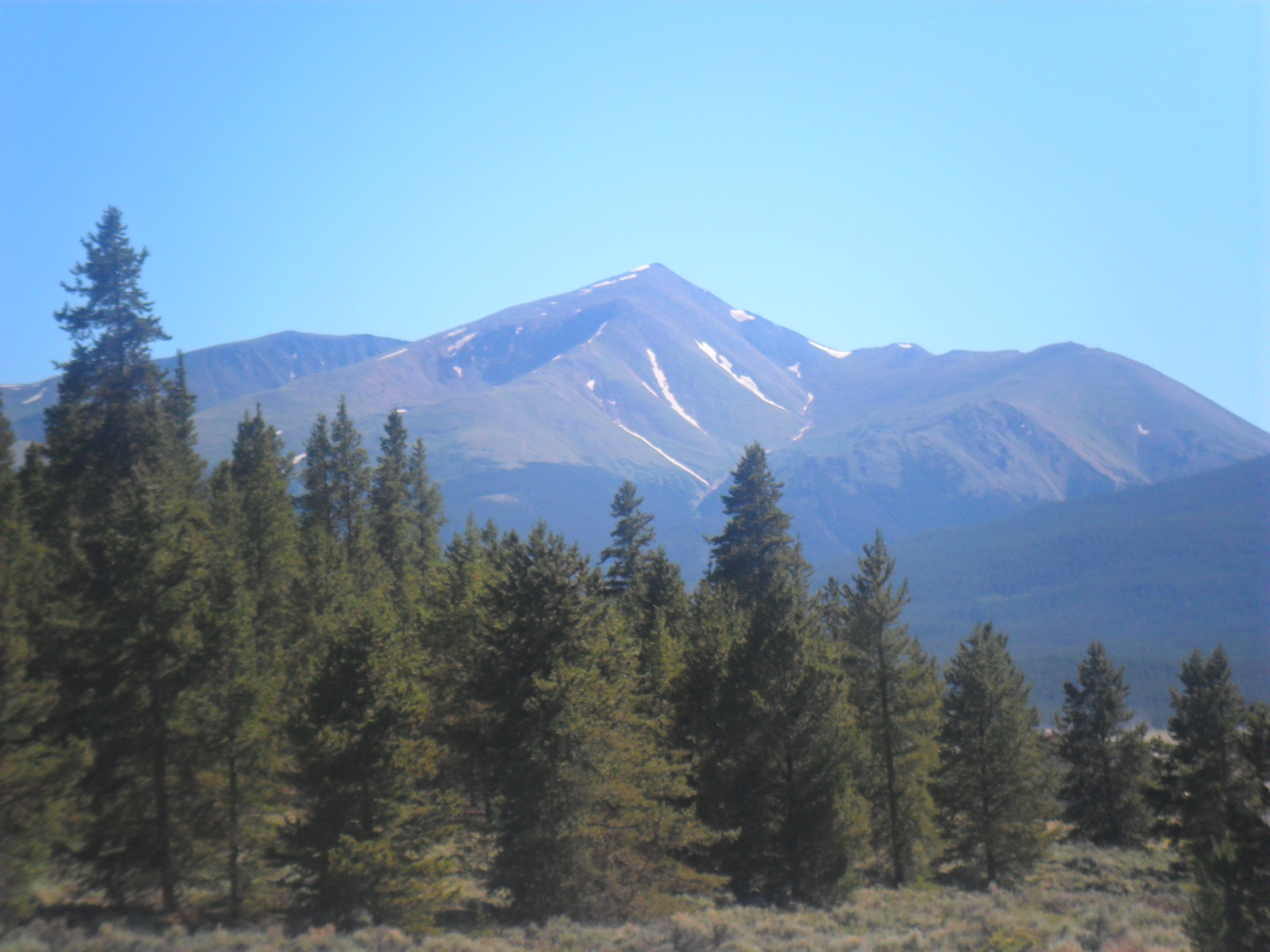
23. Mount Elbert is the highest summit of Colorado and the Rocky Mountains.

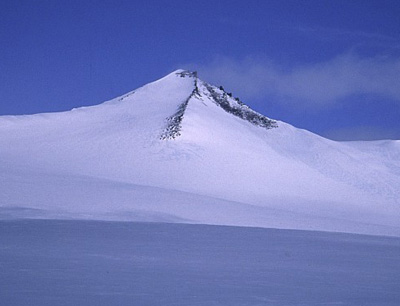
31. Barbeau Peak is the highest summit of Ellesmere Island and Nunavut.

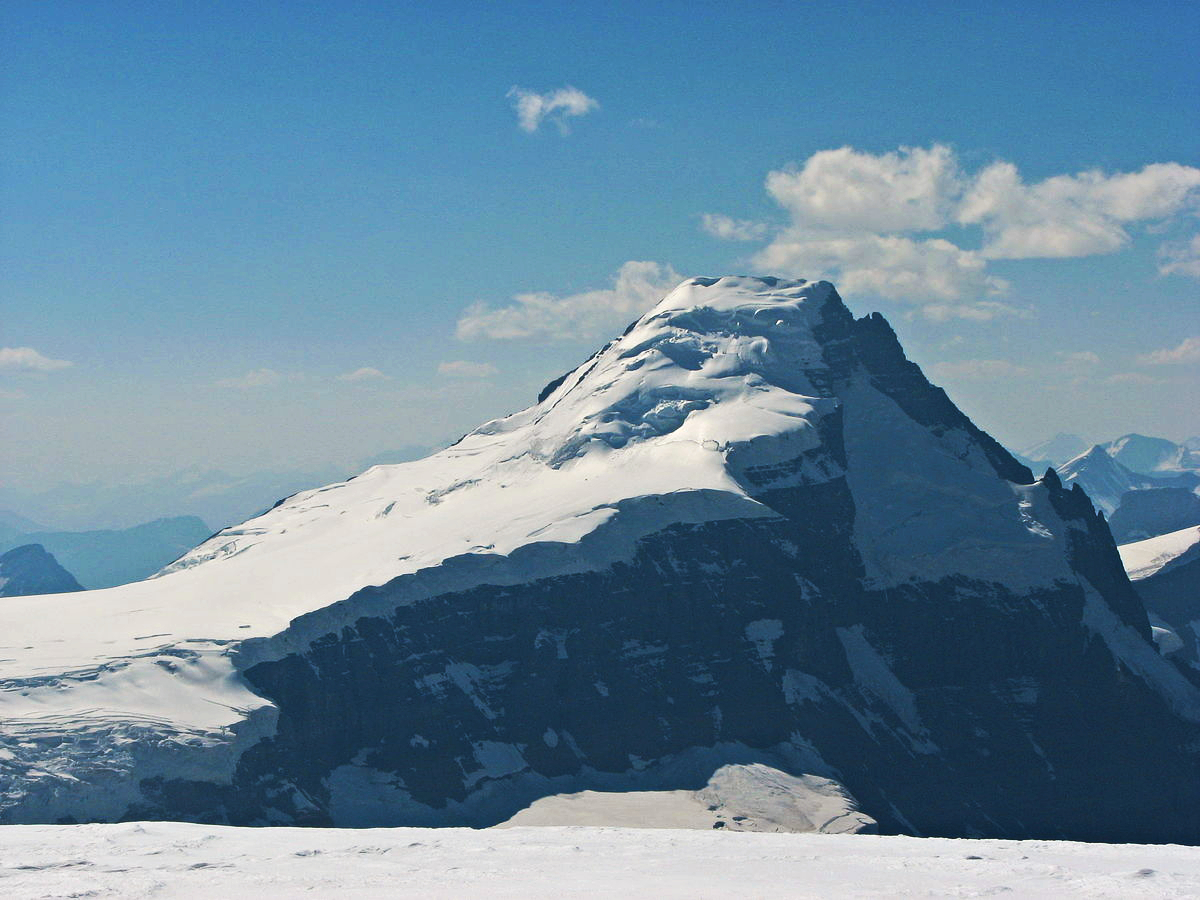
46. Mount Columbia on the British Columbia border is the highest summit of Alberta.

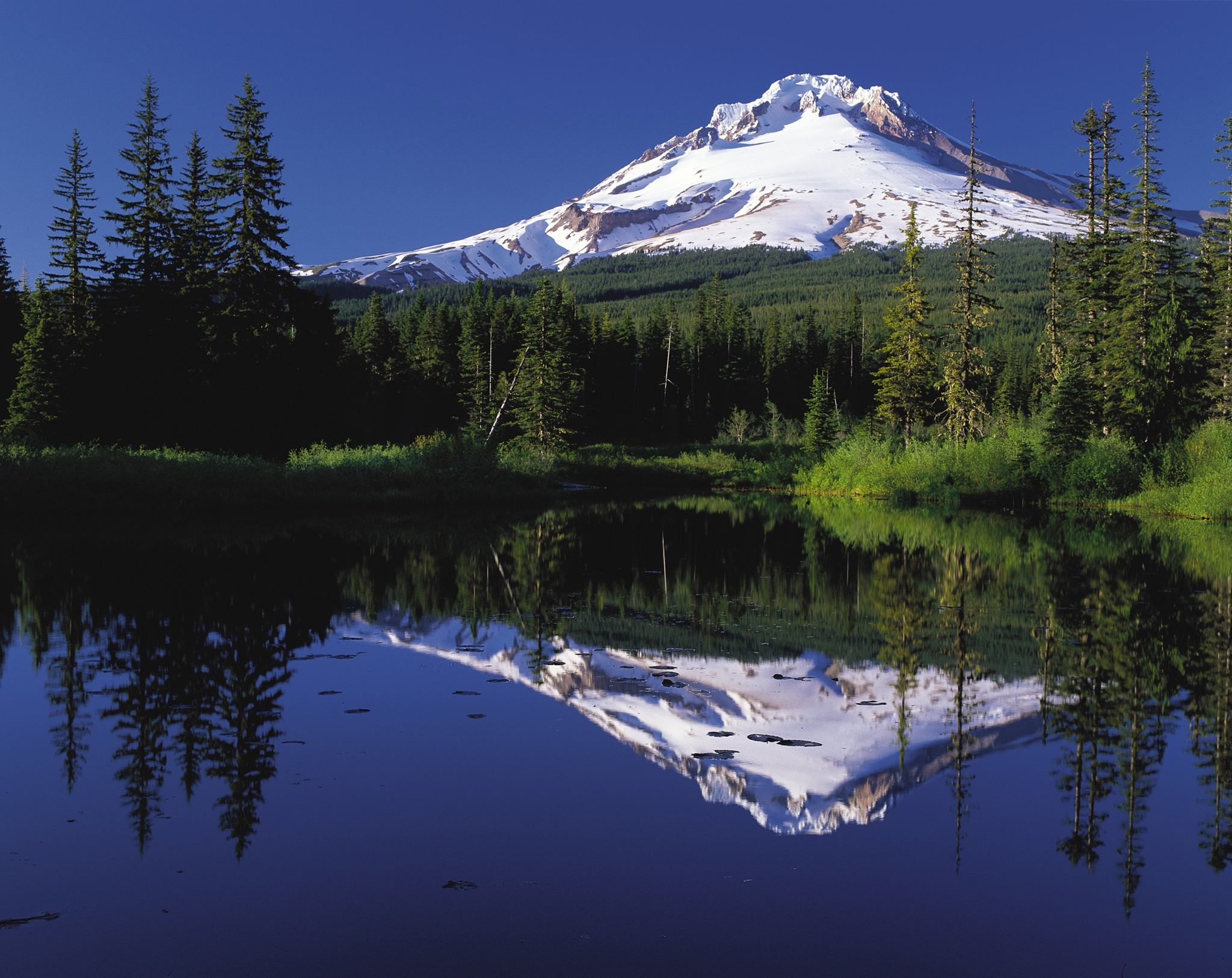
49. Mount Hood is the highest summit of Oregon.

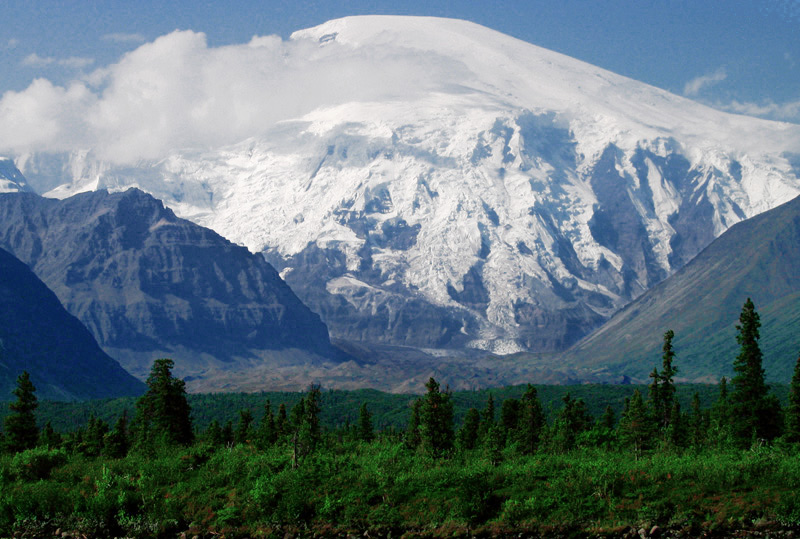
50. Mount Sanford in Alaska is the third highest volcano in the United States.

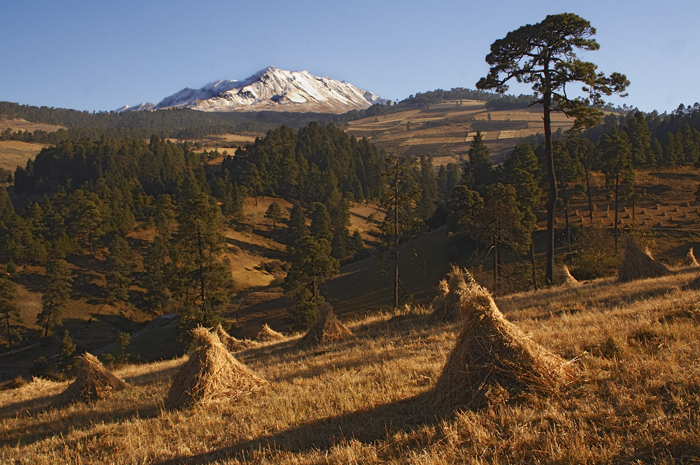
61. Nevado de Toluca is the fourth highest summit of México.

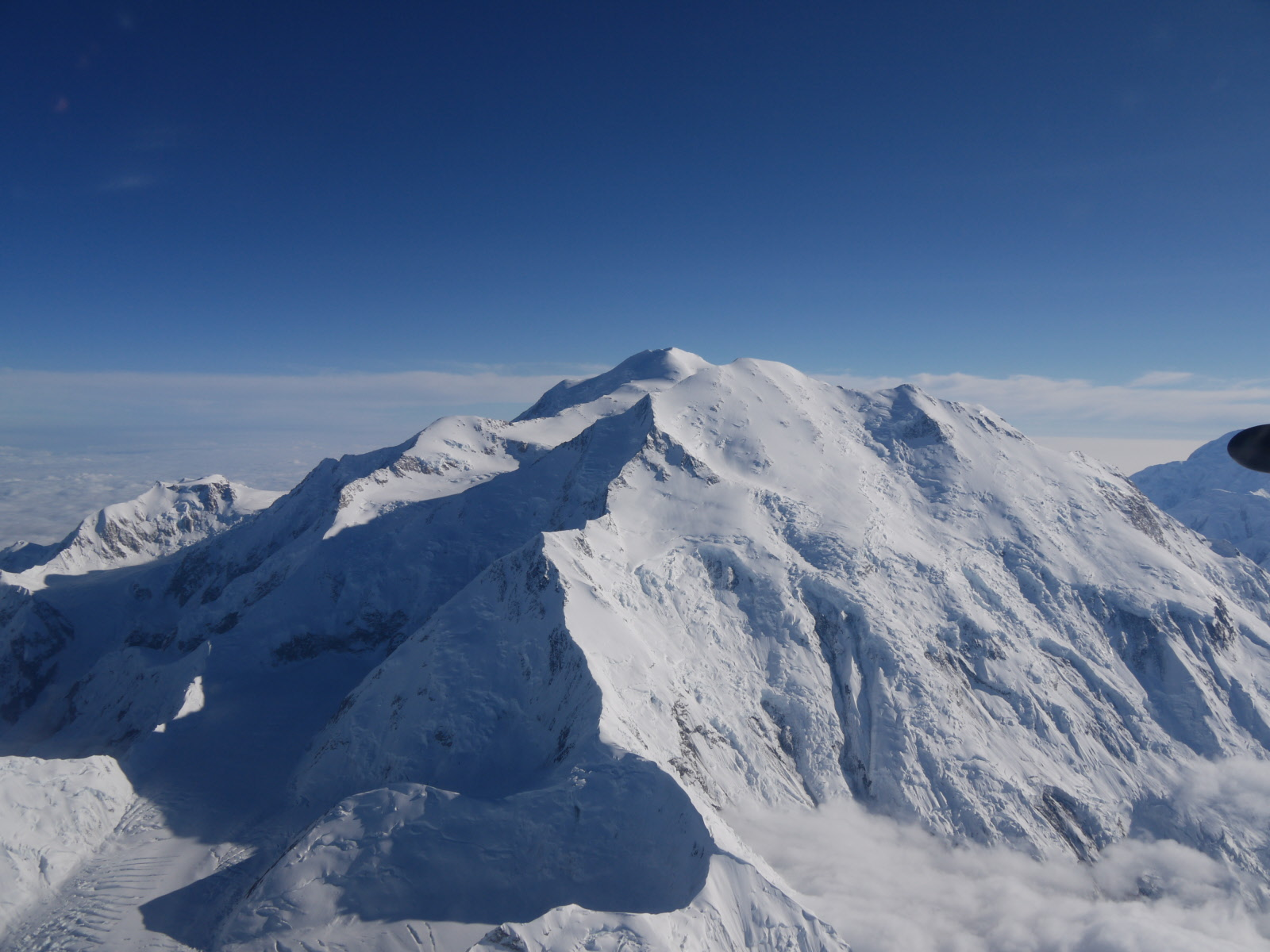
64. Mount Foraker is the second highest major summit of the Alaska Range.

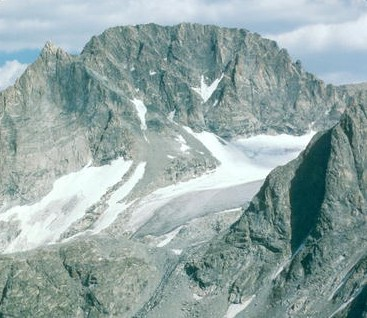
73. Gannett Peak is the highest summit of the Wind River Range and Wyoming.

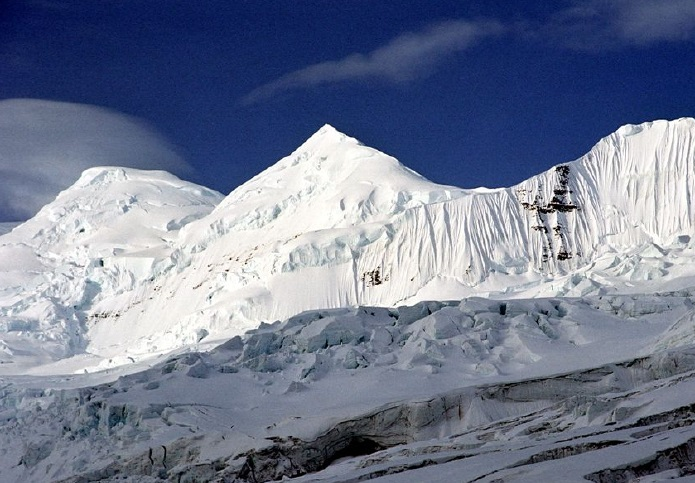
82. Mount Bona in Alaska is the highest volcano in the United States.

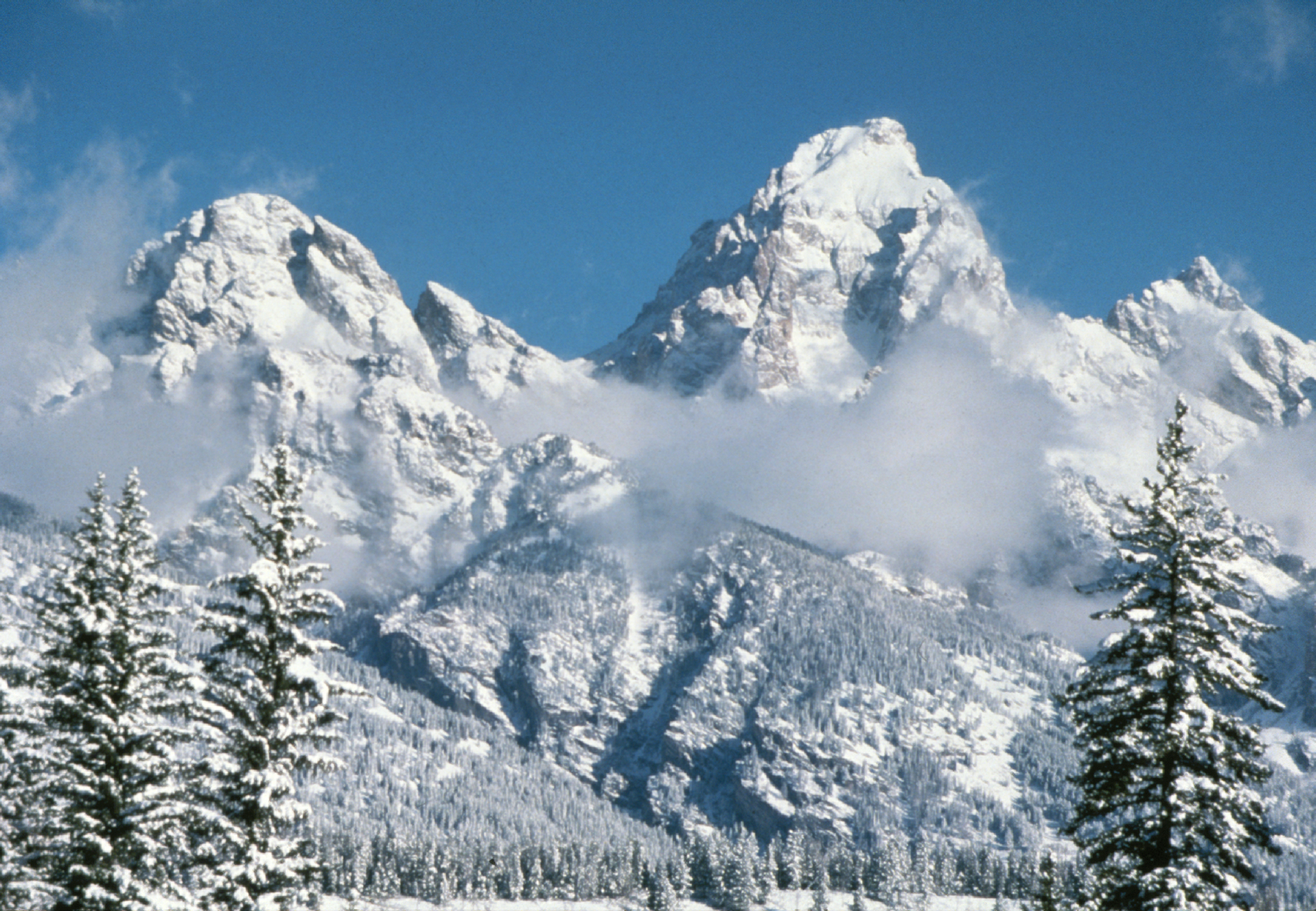
101. Grand Teton in Wyoming is the highest summit of the Teton Range.

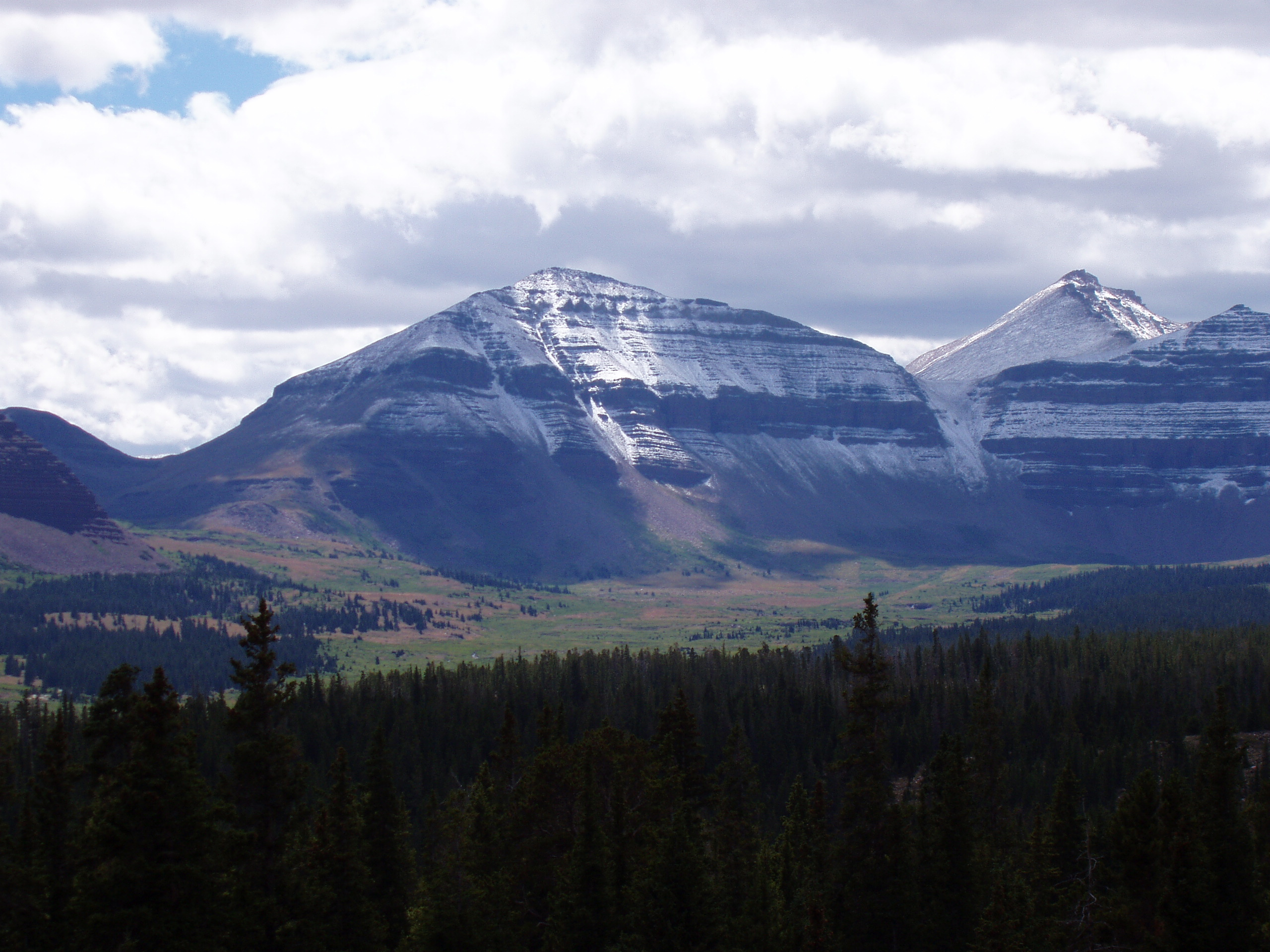
113. Kings Peak is the highest summit of the Uinta Range and Utah.

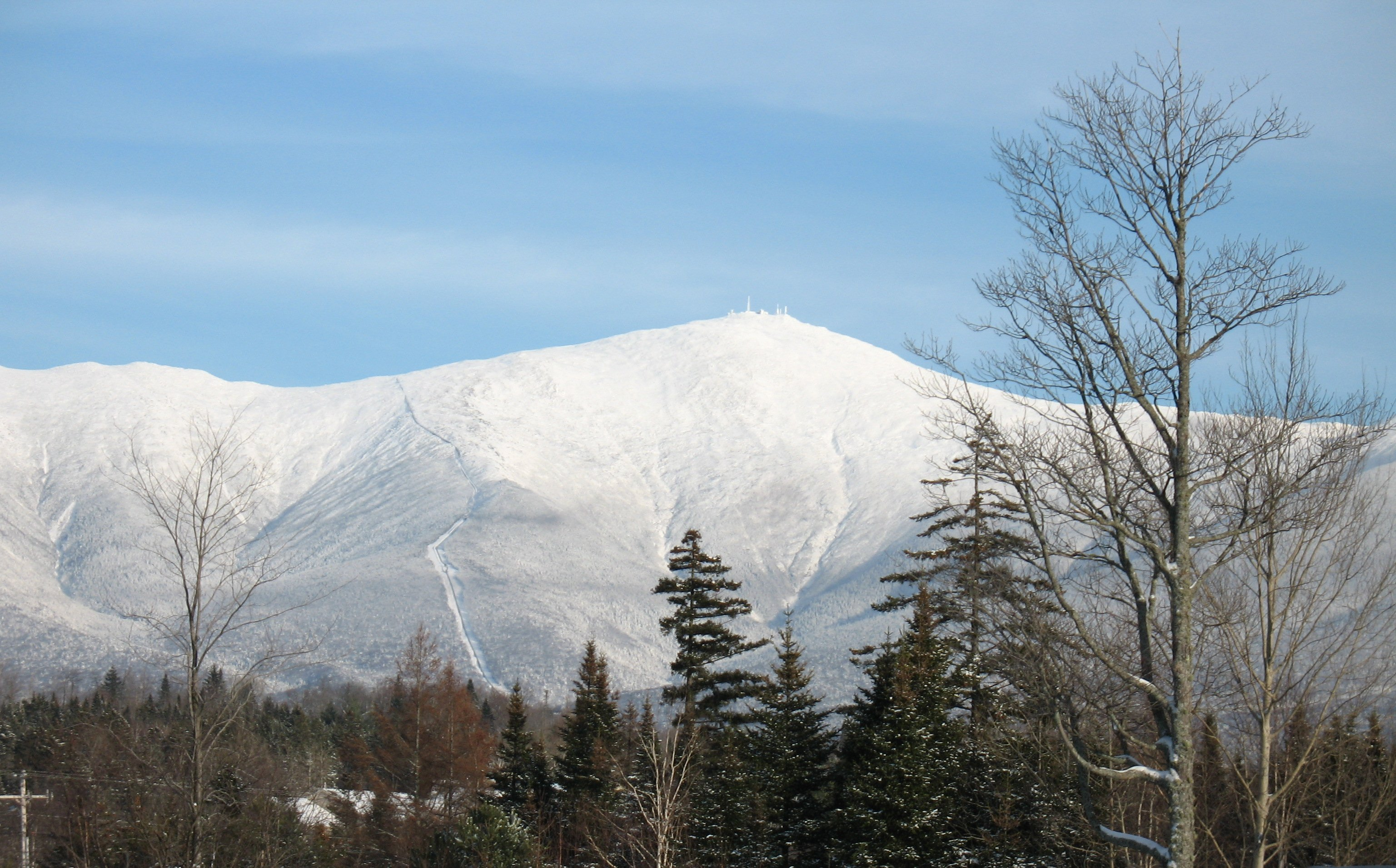
136. Mount Washington is the highest summit of the White Mountains and New Hampshire.

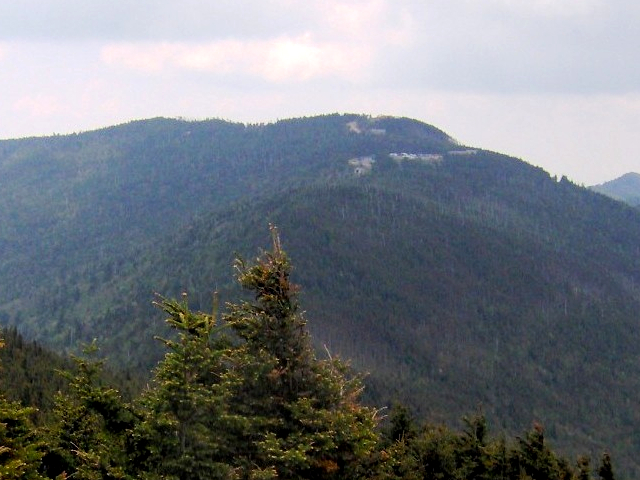
143. Mount Mitchell is the highest summit of North Carolina and the Appalachian Mountains.

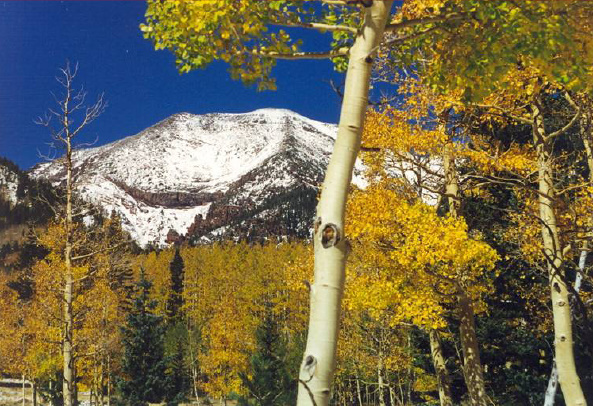
147. Humphreys Peak is the highest summit of the San Francisco Peaks and Arizona.

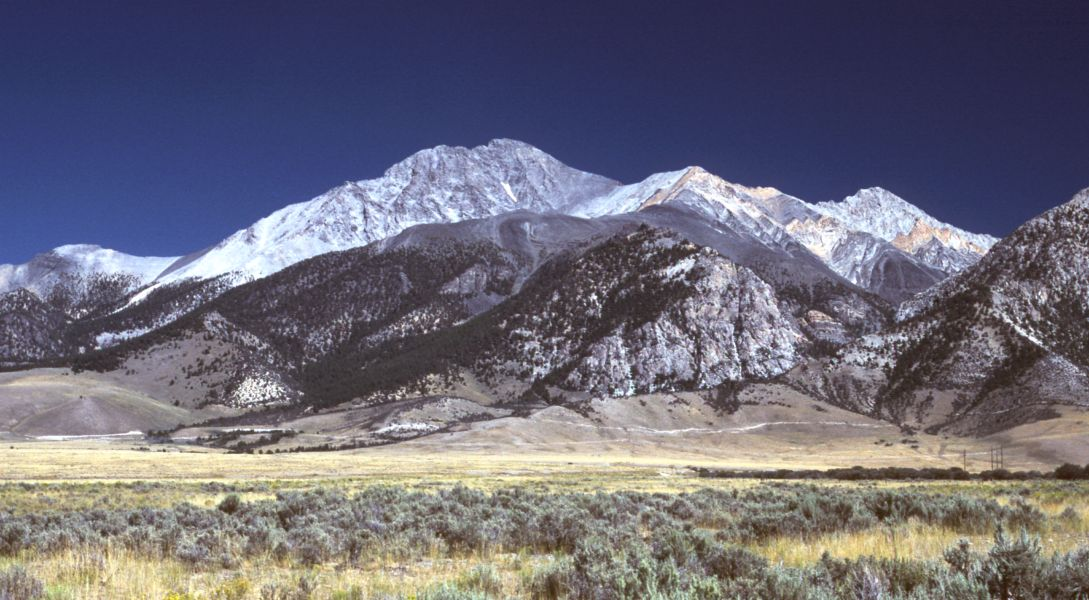
151. Borah Peak is the highest summit of the Lost River Range and Idaho.

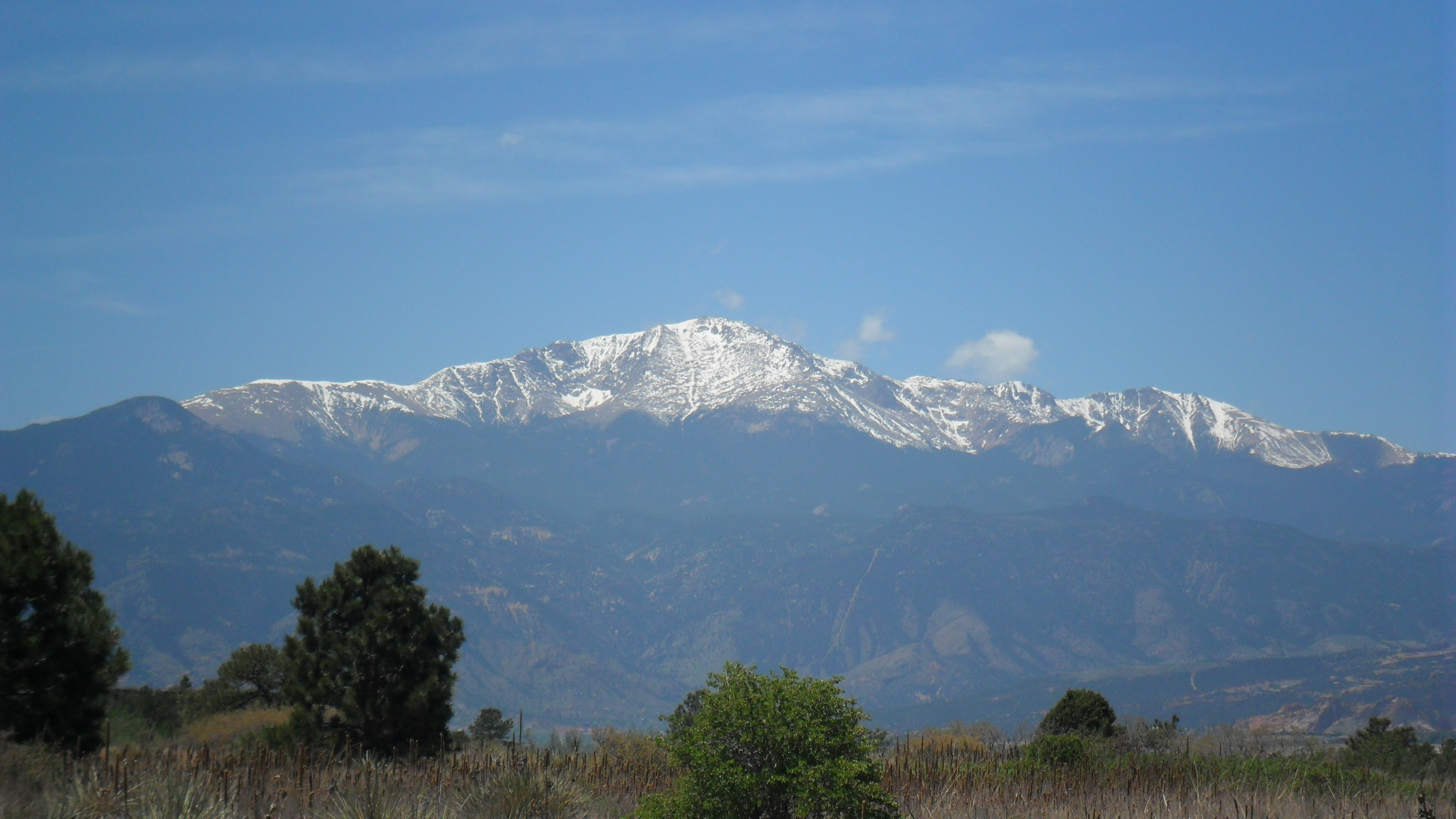
209. Pikes Peak in Colorado was the inspiration for America the Beautiful.

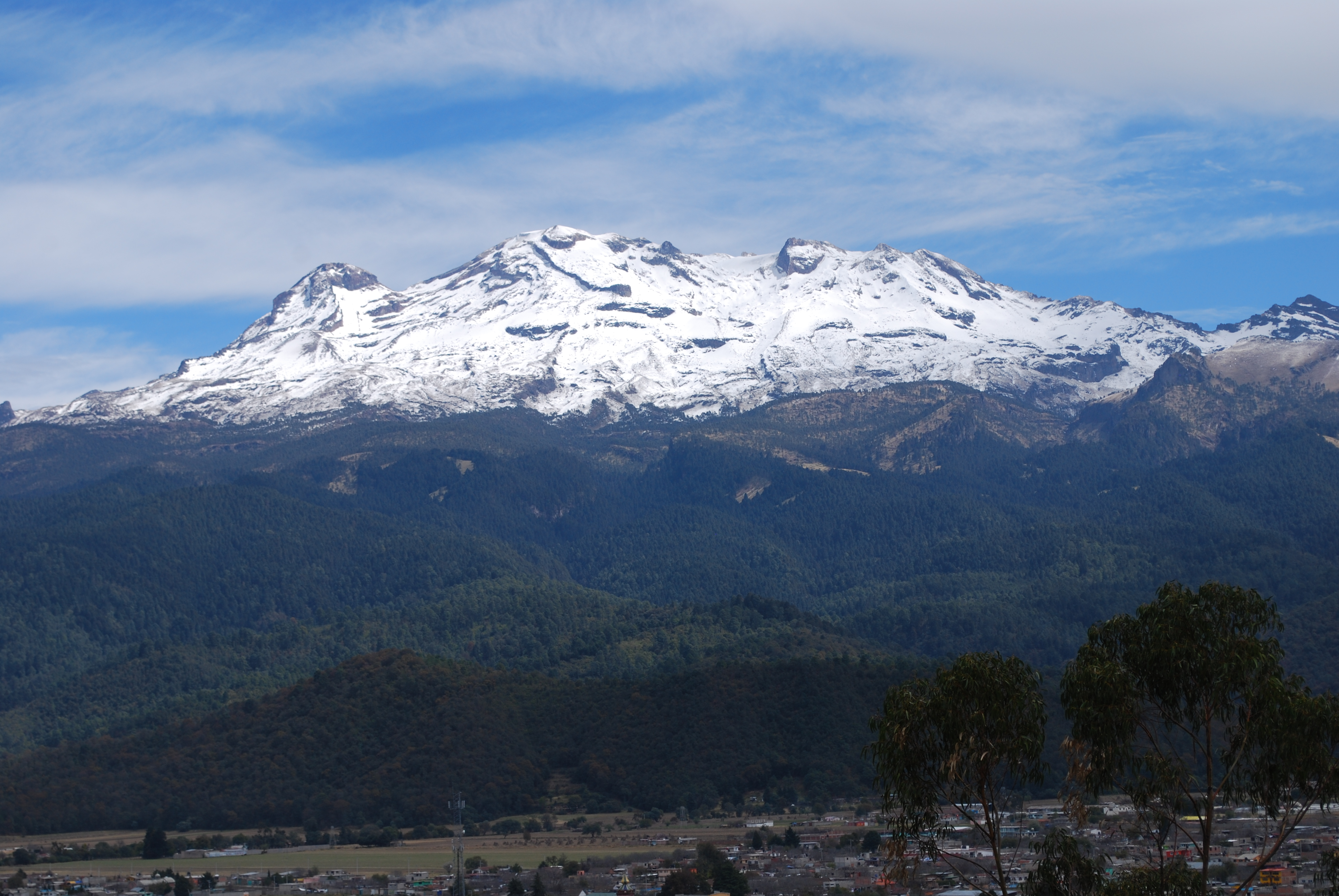
310. Iztaccihuatl is the third highest summit of México.

== See also ==
- List of mountain peaks of North America
  - List of the highest major summits of North America
  - List of the most isolated major summits of North America
  - List of mountain peaks of Greenland
  - List of mountain peaks of Canada
  - List of mountain peaks of the Rocky Mountains
  - List of mountain peaks of the United States
    - List of mountain peaks of Alaska
    - List of mountain peaks of California
    - List of mountain peaks of Colorado
    - List of mountain peaks of Hawaiʻi
  - List of mountain peaks of México
  - List of mountain peaks of Central America
  - List of mountain peaks of the Caribbean
- North America
  - Geography of North America
    - Category:Mountains of North America
      - commons:Category:Mountains of North America
- Physical geography
  - Topography
    - Topographic elevation
    - Topographic prominence
    - Topographic isolation
