= List of mountain peaks of Alaska =

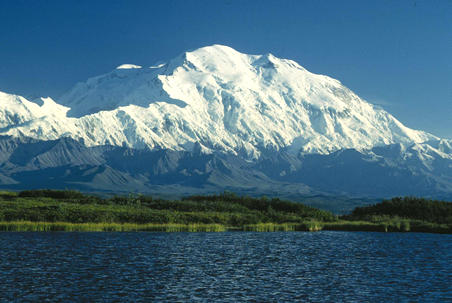
Denali in Alaska is the highest mountain peak of North America. Denali is the third most topographically prominent and third most topographically isolated summit on Earth after Mount Everest and Aconcagua.

This article comprises three sortable tables of major mountain peaks (Note: This article defines a major summit with at least 500 meters (1640 feet) of topographic prominence. An ultra-prominent summit is a summit with at least 1500 meters (4921 feet) of topographic prominence.) of the U.S. State of Alaska.

The summit of a mountain or hill may be measured in three principal ways:

1. The topographic elevation of a summit measures the height of the summit above a geodetic sea level. (Note: If the elevation or prominence of a summit is calculated as a range of values, the arithmetic mean is shown.) The first table below ranks the 100 highest major summits of Alaska by elevation.
2. The topographic prominence of a summit is a measure of how high the summit rises above its surroundings. (Note: The topographic prominence of a summit is the topographic elevation difference between the summit and its highest or key col to a higher summit. The summit may be near its key col or quite far away. The key col for Denali in Alaska is the Isthmus of Rivas in Nicaragua, 7642 kilometers (4749 miles) away.) The second table below ranks the 100 most prominent summits of Alaska.
3. The topographic isolation (or radius of dominance) of a summit measures how far the summit lies from its nearest point of equal elevation. (Note: The topographic isolation of a summit is the great-circle distance to its nearest point of equal elevation.) The third table below ranks the 50 most isolated major summits of Alaska.

== Highest major summits ==
Of the 100 highest major summits of Alaska, only Denali exceeds 6000 meters (19,685 feet) elevation, four peaks exceed 5000 meters (16,404 feet), 23 peaks exceed 4000 meters (13,123 feet), 61 peaks exceed 3000 meters (9843 feet), and 92 peaks exceed 2000 meters (6562 feet) elevation. Five of these peaks lie on the international border with Yukon and five lie on the international border with British Columbia. All ten of the highest major summits of the United States are in Alaska.

The 100 highest summits of Alaska with at least 500 meters of topographic prominence
Rank	Mountain peak	Mountain range	Elevation	Prominence	Isolation	Location
1	Denali (Note: The summit of Denali is the highest point of the Alaska Range, the State of Alaska, the United States of America, and all of North America. Denali is the third most topographically prominent and third most topographically isolated summit on Earth after Mount Everest and Aconcagua.)	Alaska Range	20,310 ft 6190.5 m	20,146 ft 6141 m	4,630 mi 7,451 km	63.0690°N 151.0063°W
2	Mount Saint Elias (Note: Mount Saint Elias is the second highest major summit of both Canada and the United States.)	Saint Elias Mountains	18,009 ft 5489 m	11,250 ft 3429 m	25.6 mi 41.3 km	60.2927°N 140.9307°W
3	Mount Foraker	Alaska Range	17,400 ft 5304 m	7,250 ft 2210 m	14.27 mi 23 km	62.9604°N 151.3998°W
4	Mount Bona (Note: The summit of Mount Bona is the highest point of the northwest Saint Elias Mountains.)	Saint Elias Mountains	16,550 ft 5044 m	6,900 ft 2103 m	49.7 mi 80 km	61.3856°N 141.7495°W
5	Mount Blackburn (Note: The summit of Mount Blackburn is the highest point of the Wrangell Mountains.)	Wrangell Mountains	16,390 ft 4996 m	11,640 ft 3548 m	60.7 mi 97.6 km	61.7305°N 143.4031°W
6	Mount Sanford	Wrangell Mountains	16,237 ft 4949 m	7,687 ft 2343 m	40.3 mi 64.8 km	62.2132°N 144.1292°W
7	Mount Fairweather (Note: Mount Fairweather on the international border of Alaska is the highest point the Canadian Province of British Columbia.) (Fairweather Mountain)	Saint Elias Mountains	15,325 ft 4671 m	12,995 ft 3961 m	124.7 mi 201 km	58.9064°N 137.5265°W
8	Mount Hubbard	Saint Elias Mountains	14,951 ft 4557 m	8,061 ft 2457 m	21.3 mi 34.4 km	60.3194°N 139.0726°W
9	Mount Bear	Saint Elias Mountains	14,831 ft 4520 m	5,054 ft 1540 m	20.1 mi 32.4 km	61.2834°N 141.1433°W
10	Mount Hunter	Alaska Range	14,573 ft 4442 m	4,653 ft 1418 m	6.88 mi 11.07 km	62.9504°N 151.0915°W
11	Mount Alverstone (Boundary Point 180)	Saint Elias Mountains	14,500 ft 4420 m	1,950 ft 594 m	2.25 mi 3.62 km	60.3518°N 139.0749°W
12	University Peak	Saint Elias Mountains	14,470 ft 4410 m	3,210 ft 978 m	3.71 mi 5.97 km	61.3272°N 141.7867°W
13	Mount Wrangell	Wrangell Mountains	14,163 ft 4317 m	5,613 ft 1711 m	14.79 mi 23.8 km	62.0059°N 144.0187°W
14	Mount Augusta	Saint Elias Mountains	14,070 ft 4289 m	5,082 ft 1549 m	14.41 mi 23.2 km	60.3074°N 140.4584°W
15	Atna Peaks	Wrangell Mountains	13,860 ft 4225 m	2,210 ft 674 m	3.64 mi 5.86 km	61.7495°N 143.2414°W
16	Regal Mountain	Wrangell Mountains	13,845 ft 4220 m	4,395 ft 1340 m	12.25 mi 19.72 km	61.7438°N 142.8675°W
17	Mount Hayes (Note: The summit of Mount Hayes is the highest point of the Hayes Range.)	Alaska Range	13,832 ft 4216 m	11,507 ft 3507 m	127.2 mi 205 km	63.6203°N 146.7178°W
18	Mount Cook	Saint Elias Mountains	13,760 ft 4194 m	7,710 ft 2350 m	14.54 mi 23.4 km	60.1816°N 139.9811°W
19	Mount Natazhat	Saint Elias Mountains	13,435 ft 4095 m	5,985 ft 1824 m	15.49 mi 24.9 km	61.5217°N 141.1030°W
20	Mount Jarvis	Wrangell Mountains	13,421 ft 4091 m	4,771 ft 1454 m	11.15 mi 17.95 km	62.0234°N 143.6198°W
21	Tressider Peak	Saint Elias Mountains	13,315 ft 4058 m	1,665 ft 507 m	3.32 mi 5.34 km	61.3590°N 141.6664°W
22	Mount Silverthrone	Alaska Range	13,220 ft 4029 m	3,240 ft 988 m	7.9 mi 12.72 km	63.1157°N 150.6755°W
23	Mount Marcus Baker (Note: The summit of Mount Marcus Baker is the highest point of the Chugach Mountains.)	Chugach Mountains	13,176 ft 4016 m	10,751 ft 3277 m	126.8 mi 204 km	61.4374°N 147.7525°W
24	Mount Moffit	Alaska Range	13,020 ft 3969 m	3,970 ft 1210 m	10.2 mi 16.41 km	63.5683°N 146.3982°W
25	Mount Root	Saint Elias Mountains	12,887 ft 3928 m	2,979 ft 908 m	5.46 mi 8.79 km	58.9854°N 137.5001°W
26	Mount Crosson	Alaska Range	12,800 ft 3901 m	1,650 ft 503 m	5.11 mi 8.22 km	63.0081°N 151.2763°W
27	Mount Crillon	Saint Elias Mountains	12,726 ft 3879 m	7,176 ft 2187 m	19.52 mi 31.4 km	58.6625°N 137.1712°W
28	Mount Gunnar Naslund	Saint Elias Mountains	12,658 ft 3858 m	2,108 ft 643 m	6.86 mi 11.04 km	61.2282°N 141.3140°W
29	Mount Tlingit	Saint Elias Mountains	12,606 ft 3842 m	2,006 ft 611 m	2.26 mi 3.63 km	58.8931°N 137.3938°W
30	Mount Carpe	Alaska Range	12,550 ft 3825 m	1,800 ft 549 m	4.1 mi 6.6 km	63.1521°N 150.8616°W
31	Kahiltna Dome	Alaska Range	12,525 ft 3818 m	2,175 ft 663 m	3.45 mi 5.55 km	63.0550°N 151.2394°W
32	Mount Thor	Chugach Mountains	12,521 ft 3816 m	3,271 ft 997 m	20.4 mi 32.8 km	61.4854°N 147.1460°W
33	Mount Watson	Saint Elias Mountains	12,497 ft 3809 m	1,932 ft 589 m	2.52 mi 4.05 km	59.0088°N 137.5541°W
34	Moby Dick	Alaska Range	12,360 ft 3767 m	2,910 ft 887 m	4.78 mi 7.7 km	63.5561°N 146.6026°W
35	Mount Deborah	Alaska Range	12,339 ft 3761 m	5,189 ft 1582 m	16.08 mi 25.9 km	63.6377°N 147.2384°W
36	Mount Huntington	Alaska Range	12,240 ft 3731 m	2,890 ft 881 m	3.88 mi 6.24 km	62.9677°N 150.8996°W
37	Mount Huxley	Saint Elias Mountains	12,216 ft 3723 m	2,066 ft 630 m	5.49 mi 8.84 km	60.3279°N 141.1554°W
38	Mount Jordan	Saint Elias Mountains	12,190 ft 3716 m	2,340 ft 713 m	7.08 mi 11.4 km	61.3987°N 141.4700°W
39	Mount Salisbury	Saint Elias Mountains	12,170 ft 3709 m	4,020 ft 1225 m	3.04 mi 4.9 km	58.8505°N 137.3719°W
40	Mount Mather	Alaska Range	12,123 ft 3695 m	2,873 ft 876 m	9.27 mi 14.92 km	63.1946°N 150.4362°W
41	Siris Peak	Saint Elias Mountains	12,050 ft 3673 m	2,600 ft 792 m	16.05 mi 25.8 km	60.7340°N 141.0138°W
42	Mount Witherspoon	Chugach Mountains	12,012 ft 3661 m	2,162 ft 659 m	5.98 mi 9.63 km	61.3954°N 147.2010°W
43	Mount Drum	Wrangell Mountains	12,010 ft 3661 m	6,760 ft 2060 m	17.73 mi 28.5 km	62.1159°N 144.6394°W
44	Mount Hope	Saint Elias Mountains	11,950 ft 3642 m	2,000 ft 610 m	2.64 mi 4.25 km	60.7039°N 141.0614°W
45	Hess Mountain	Alaska Range	11,940 ft 3639 m	2,490 ft 759 m	2.78 mi 4.47 km	63.6382°N 147.1482°W
45	Mount Brooks	Alaska Range	11,940 ft 3639 m	1,790 ft 546 m	5.03 mi 8.09 km	63.1875°N 150.6479°W
47	The Grand Parapet	Saint Elias Mountains	11,930 ft 3636 m	2,180 ft 664 m	5.26 mi 8.47 km	61.4103°N 142.0266°W
48	Lituya Mountain	Saint Elias Mountains	11,924 ft 3634 m	3,674 ft 1120 m	3.9 mi 6.27 km	58.8054°N 137.4367°W
48	Haydon Peak	Saint Elias Mountains	11,924 ft 3634 m	1,674 ft 510 m	2.97 mi 4.78 km	60.2606°N 140.9881°W
50	Mount Donna	Saint Elias Mountains	11,915 ft 3632 m	2,665 ft 812 m	6.63 mi 10.67 km	61.1341°N 141.3509°W
51	Mount Russell	Alaska Range	11,670 ft 3557 m	5,520 ft 1682 m	14.07 mi 22.7 km	62.7984°N 151.8845°W
52	Mount Torbert (Note: The summit of Mount Torbert is the highest point of the Tordrillo Mountains.)	Alaska Range	11,413 ft 3479 m	8,688 ft 2648 m	97.8 mi 157.3 km	61.4086°N 152.4125°W
53	Mount Tom White	Chugach Mountains	11,191 ft 3411 m	7,641 ft 2329 m	73 mi 117.6 km	60.6518°N 143.6972°W
54	Mount Foresta	Saint Elias Mountains	11,050 ft 3368 m	5,400 ft 1646 m	12.51 mi 20.1 km	60.1912°N 139.4323°W
55	Mount Miller (Note: The summit of Mount Miller is the highest point of the Barkley Ridge.)	Chugach Mountains	10,750 ft 3277 m	5,300 ft 1615 m	40.3 mi 64.9 km	60.4605°N 142.3012°W
56	Mount Steller	Chugach Mountains	10,515 ft 3205 m	5,365 ft 1635 m	22.5 mi 36.2 km	60.5199°N 143.0932°W
57	Mount Kimball (Note: The summit of Mount Kimball is the highest point of the Delta Range.)	Alaska Range	10,350 ft 3155 m	7,425 ft 2263 m	55.8 mi 89.8 km	63.2390°N 144.6419°W
57	Mount Seattle	Saint Elias Mountains	10,350 ft 3155 m	5,561 ft 1695 m	11.97 mi 19.26 km	60.0680°N 139.1893°W
59	Redoubt Volcano (Note: The summit of Redoubt Volcano is the highest point of the Chigmit Mountains.)	Chigmit Mountains	10,197 ft 3108 m	9,147 ft 2788 m	58.7 mi 94.5 km	60.4854°N 152.7442°W
60	Iliamna Volcano	Chigmit Mountains	10,016 ft 3053 m	7,866 ft 2398 m	33.6 mi 54.1 km	60.0321°N 153.0915°W
60	Kates Needle	Coast Mountains	10,016 ft 3053 m	4,537 ft 1383 m	26 mi 41.8 km	57.0449°N 132.0451°W
62	Mount Hesperus (Note: The summit of Mount Hesperus is the highest point of the West Alaska Range.)	Alaska Range	9,828 ft 2996 m	6,978 ft 2127 m	58.1 mi 93.5 km	61.8036°N 154.1469°W
63	Mount Neacola (Note: The summit of Mount Neacola is the highest point of the Neacola Mountains.)	Aleutian Range	9,426 ft 2873 m	6,376 ft 1943 m	31 mi 49.9 km	60.7981°N 153.3959°W
64	Shishaldin Volcano (Note: The summit of Shishaldin Volcano is the highest point of Unimak Island and all the Aleutian Islands.)	Unimak Island	9,414 ft 2869 m	9,414 ft 2869 m	545 mi 877 km	54.7554°N 163.9709°W
65	Mount Aylesworth	Saint Elias Mountains	9,285 ft 2830 m	4,659 ft 1420 m	16.81 mi 27.1 km	59.9242°N 138.7985°W
66	Kichatna Spire	Alaska Range	8,985 ft 2739 m	6,235 ft 1900 m	37.3 mi 60 km	62.4231°N 152.7231°W
67	Mount Isto (Note: The summit of Mount Isto is the highest point of the Brooks Range.)	Brooks Range	8,976 ft 2736 m	7,901 ft 2408 m	394 mi 634 km	69.2025°N 143.8020°W
68	Mount Chamberlin	Brooks Range	8,901 ft 2713 m	4,151 ft 1265 m	27.3 mi 43.9 km	69.2775°N 144.9107°W
69	Sovereign Mountain (Note: The summit of Sovereign Mountain is the highest point of the Talkeetna Mountains.)	Talkeetna Mountains	8,849 ft 2697 m	5,874 ft 1790 m	45.6 mi 73.5 km	62.1311°N 148.6044°W
70	Bearhole Peak (Note: The summit of Bearhole Peak is the highest point of the Granite Range.)	Saint Elias Mountains	8,517 ft 2596 m	5,367 ft 1636 m	9.71 mi 15.62 km	60.9283°N 142.5237°W
71	Devils Paw (Note: The summit of Devils Paw is the highest point of the Juneau Icefield.)	Coast Mountains	8,507 ft 2593 m	5,587 ft 1703 m	84.7 mi 136.3 km	58.7289°N 133.8402°W
72	Hanagita Peak	Chugach Mountains	8,504 ft 2592 m	5,954 ft 1815 m	22 mi 35.3 km	61.0670°N 143.7075°W
73	Stony Peak (Peak 8488)	Alaska Range	8,488 ft 2587 m	5,138 ft 1566 m	11.92 mi 19.19 km	61.4950°N 153.6224°W
74	Tetlin Peak	Alaska Range	8,365 ft 2550 m	5,240 ft 1597 m	25.5 mi 41.1 km	62.6215°N 143.1084°W
75	Necons Peak (Peak 8336)	Alaska Range	8,336 ft 2541 m	5,186 ft 1581 m	21.9 mi 35.3 km	61.1125°N 153.4690°W
76	Mount Igikpak (Note: The summit of Mount Igikpak is the highest point of the Schwatka Mountains.)	Brooks Range	8,276 ft 2523 m	6,126 ft 1867 m	282 mi 453 km	67.4129°N 154.9656°W
77	Pavlof Volcano (Note: The summit of Pavlof Volcano is the highest point of the Alaska Peninsula.)	Alaska Peninsula	8,250 ft 2515 m	8,200 ft 2499 m	94.3 mi 151.8 km	55.4173°N 161.8932°W
78	Mount Veniaminof	Alaska Peninsula	8,225 ft 2507 m	8,200 ft 2499 m	210 mi 337 km	56.2194°N 159.2975°W
79	Isanotski Peaks	Unimak Island	8,106 ft 2471 m	5,856 ft 1785 m	9.71 mi 15.62 km	54.7680°N 163.7291°W
80	De Long Peak (Peak 8084)	Chugach Mountains	8,084 ft 2464 m	6,234 ft 1900 m	43.1 mi 69.3 km	60.8299°N 145.1335°W
81	Accomplishment Peak (Note: The summit of Accomplishment Peak is the highest point of the Philip Smith Mountains.)	Brooks Range	8,045 ft 2452 m	4,195 ft 1279 m	86.5 mi 139.2 km	68.4433°N 148.0947°W
82	Twin Dewey Peaks (Alaska) (Peak 8010)	Chugach Mountains	8,010 ft 2441 m	6,160 ft 1878 m	25.3 mi 40.7 km	61.1605°N 144.8129°W
83	Bashful Peak (Note: The summit of Bashful Peak is the highest point of the western Chugach Mountains.)	Chugach Mountains	8,005 ft 2440 m	5,275 ft 1608 m	22.1 mi 35.5 km	61.3076°N 148.8697°W
84	Mount Griggs	Alaska Peninsula	7,650 ft 2332 m	7,300 ft 2225 m	136.3 mi 219 km	58.3534°N 155.0958°W
85	Cleave Peak (Peak 7500)	Chugach Mountains	7,550 ft 2301 m	4,779 ft 1457 m	11.86 mi 19.08 km	61.1256°N 145.3006°W
86	Mount Vsevidof (Note: The summit of Mount Vsevidof is the highest point of Umnak Island and the westernmost 2000 meter (6562-foot) summit of greater North America.)	Umnak Island	7,051 ft 2149 m	7,051 ft 2149 m	223 mi 359 km	53.1256°N 168.6938°W
87	Mount Douglas	Alaska Peninsula	7,050 ft 2149 m	6,300 ft 1920 m	42.9 mi 69 km	58.8598°N 153.5353°W
88	Mount Chiginagak	Aleutian Range	6,925 ft 2111 m	6,675 ft 2035 m	97.7 mi 157.2 km	57.1334°N 156.9912°W
89	Copper Peak (Peak 6915)	Chugach Mountains	6,915 ft 2108 m	5,065 ft 1544 m	11.1 mi 17.87 km	61.3297°N 144.9599°W
90	Double Peak	Chigmit Mountains	6,818 ft 2078 m	4,701 ft 1433 m	17.75 mi 28.6 km	60.7296°N 152.5861°W
91	Truuli Peak (Note: The summit of Truuli Peak is the highest point of the Kenai Mountains.)	Kenai Mountains	6,612 ft 2015 m	6,062 ft 1848 m	88.9 mi 143.1 km	59.9129°N 150.4348°W
92	Snow Tower	Coast Mountains	6,572 ft 2003 m	6,122 ft 1866 m	10.12 mi 16.28 km	58.1724°N 133.4009°W
93	Mount Harper	Yukon–Tanana uplands	6,543 ft 1994 m	1,640 ft 500 m	63.8 mi 102.7 km	64.2370°N 143.8442°W
94	Isthmus Peak	Kenai Mountains	6,532 ft 1991 m	5,782 ft 1762 m	32.3 mi 52 km	60.5772°N 148.8915°W
95	Pogromni Volcano	Unimak Island	6,531 ft 1991 m	6,181 ft 1884 m	31.7 mi 50.9 km	54.5705°N 164.6926°W
96	Tanaga Volcano (Note: The summit of Tanaga Volcano is the highest point of Tanaga Island and the Andreanof Islands.)	Tanaga Island	5,925 ft 1806 m	5,925 ft 1806 m	408 mi 656 km	51.8838°N 178.1429°W
97	Makushin Volcano (Note: The summit of Makushin Volcano is the highest point of Unalaska Island.)	Unalaska Island	5,905 ft 1800 m	5,905 ft 1800 m	83.1 mi 133.8 km	53.8782°N 166.9299°W
98	Frosty Peak Volcano	Aleutian Range	5,803 ft 1769 m	5,753 ft 1754 m	35.4 mi 56.9 km	55.0672°N 162.8351°W
99	Chunekukleik Mountain	Saint Elias Mountains	5,780 ft 1762 m	4,730 ft 1442 m	7.61 mi 12.24 km	59.2919°N 135.9529°W
100	Great Sitkin Volcano (Note: The summit of Great Sitkin Volcano is the highest point of Great Sitkin Island.)	Great Sitkin Island	5,710 ft 1740 m	5,710 ft 1740 m	87.8 mi 141.3 km	52.0763°N 176.1108°W

== Most prominent summits ==
Of the 100 most prominent summits of Alaska, only Denali exceeds 4000 meters (13,123 feet) of topographic prominence, six peaks exceed 3000 meters (9843 feet), 26 peaks exceed 2000 meters (6562 feet), and 65 peaks are ultra-prominent summits with at least 1500 meters (4921 feet) of topographic prominence. Four of these peaks lie on the international border with British Columbia and four lie on the international border with Yukon.

The 100 most topographically prominent summits of Alaska
Rank	Mountain peak	Mountain range	Elevation	Prominence	Isolation	Location
1	Denali	Alaska Range	20,310 ft 6190.5 m	20,146 ft 6141 m	4,630 mi 7,451 km	63.0690°N 151.0063°W
2	Mount Fairweather (Fairweather Mountain)	Saint Elias Mountains	15,325 ft 4671 m	12,995 ft 3961 m	124.7 mi 201 km	58.9064°N 137.5265°W
3	Mount Blackburn	Wrangell Mountains	16,390 ft 4996 m	11,640 ft 3548 m	60.7 mi 97.6 km	61.7305°N 143.4031°W
4	Mount Hayes	Alaska Range	13,832 ft 4216 m	11,507 ft 3507 m	127.2 mi 205 km	63.6203°N 146.7178°W
5	Mount Saint Elias	Saint Elias Mountains	18,009 ft 5489 m	11,250 ft 3429 m	25.6 mi 41.3 km	60.2927°N 140.9307°W
6	Mount Marcus Baker	Chugach Mountains	13,176 ft 4016 m	10,751 ft 3277 m	126.8 mi 204 km	61.4374°N 147.7525°W
7	Shishaldin Volcano	Unimak Island	9,414 ft 2869 m	9,414 ft 2869 m	545 mi 877 km	54.7554°N 163.9709°W
8	Redoubt Volcano	Chigmit Mountains	10,197 ft 3108 m	9,147 ft 2788 m	58.7 mi 94.5 km	60.4854°N 152.7442°W
9	Mount Torbert	Alaska Range	11,413 ft 3479 m	8,688 ft 2648 m	97.8 mi 157.3 km	61.4086°N 152.4125°W
10	Pavlof Volcano	Alaska Peninsula	8,250 ft 2515 m	8,200 ft 2499 m	94.3 mi 151.8 km	55.4173°N 161.8932°W
10	Mount Veniaminof	Alaska Peninsula	8,225 ft 2507 m	8,200 ft 2499 m	210 mi 337 km	56.2194°N 159.2975°W
12	Mount Hubbard	Saint Elias Mountains	14,951 ft 4557 m	8,061 ft 2457 m	21.3 mi 34.4 km	60.3194°N 139.0726°W
13	Mount Isto	Brooks Range	8,976 ft 2736 m	7,901 ft 2408 m	394 mi 634 km	69.2025°N 143.8020°W
14	Iliamna Volcano	Chigmit Mountains	10,016 ft 3053 m	7,866 ft 2398 m	33.6 mi 54.1 km	60.0321°N 153.0915°W
15	Mount Cook	Saint Elias Mountains	13,760 ft 4194 m	7,710 ft 2350 m	14.54 mi 23.4 km	60.1816°N 139.9811°W
16	Mount Sanford	Wrangell Mountains	16,237 ft 4949 m	7,687 ft 2343 m	40.3 mi 64.8 km	62.2132°N 144.1292°W
17	Mount Tom White	Chugach Mountains	11,191 ft 3411 m	7,641 ft 2329 m	73 mi 117.6 km	60.6518°N 143.6972°W
18	Mount Kimball	Alaska Range	10,350 ft 3155 m	7,425 ft 2263 m	55.8 mi 89.8 km	63.2390°N 144.6419°W
19	Mount Griggs	Alaska Peninsula	7,650 ft 2332 m	7,300 ft 2225 m	136.3 mi 219 km	58.3534°N 155.0958°W
20	Mount Foraker	Alaska Range	17,400 ft 5304 m	7,250 ft 2210 m	14.27 mi 23 km	62.9604°N 151.3998°W
21	Mount Crillon	Saint Elias Mountains	12,726 ft 3879 m	7,176 ft 2187 m	19.52 mi 31.4 km	58.6625°N 137.1712°W
22	Mount Vsevidof	Umnak Island	7,051 ft 2149 m	7,051 ft 2149 m	223 mi 359 km	53.1256°N 168.6938°W
23	Mount Hesperus	Alaska Range	9,828 ft 2996 m	6,978 ft 2127 m	58.1 mi 93.5 km	61.8036°N 154.1469°W
24	Mount Bona	Saint Elias Mountains	16,550 ft 5044 m	6,900 ft 2103 m	49.7 mi 80 km	61.3856°N 141.7495°W
25	Mount Drum	Wrangell Mountains	12,010 ft 3661 m	6,760 ft 2060 m	17.73 mi 28.5 km	62.1159°N 144.6394°W
26	Mount Chiginagak	Aleutian Range	6,925 ft 2111 m	6,675 ft 2035 m	97.7 mi 157.2 km	57.1334°N 156.9912°W
27	Mount Neacola	Aleutian Range	9,426 ft 2873 m	6,376 ft 1943 m	31 mi 49.9 km	60.7981°N 153.3959°W
28	Mount Douglas	Alaska Peninsula	7,050 ft 2149 m	6,300 ft 1920 m	42.9 mi 69 km	58.8598°N 153.5353°W
29	Kichatna Spire	Alaska Range	8,985 ft 2739 m	6,235 ft 1900 m	37.3 mi 60 km	62.4231°N 152.7231°W
30	De Long Peak (Peak 8084)	Chugach Mountains	8,084 ft 2464 m	6,234 ft 1900 m	43.1 mi 69.3 km	60.8299°N 145.1335°W
31	Pogromni Volcano	Unimak Island	6,531 ft 1991 m	6,181 ft 1884 m	31.7 mi 50.9 km	54.5705°N 164.6926°W
32	Twin Dewey Peaks (Alaska) (Peak 8010)	Chugach Mountains	8,010 ft 2441 m	6,160 ft 1878 m	25.3 mi 40.7 km	61.1605°N 144.8129°W
33	Mount Igikpak	Brooks Range	8,276 ft 2523 m	6,126 ft 1867 m	282 mi 453 km	67.4129°N 154.9656°W
34	Snow Tower	Coast Mountains	6,572 ft 2003 m	6,122 ft 1866 m	10.12 mi 16.28 km	58.1724°N 133.4009°W
35	Truuli Peak	Kenai Mountains	6,612 ft 2015 m	6,062 ft 1848 m	88.9 mi 143.1 km	59.9129°N 150.4348°W
36	Mount Natazhat	Saint Elias Mountains	13,435 ft 4095 m	5,985 ft 1824 m	15.49 mi 24.9 km	61.5217°N 141.1030°W
37	Hanagita Peak	Chugach Mountains	8,504 ft 2592 m	5,954 ft 1815 m	22 mi 35.3 km	61.0670°N 143.7075°W
38	Tanaga Volcano	Tanaga Island	5,925 ft 1806 m	5,925 ft 1806 m	408 mi 656 km	51.8838°N 178.1429°W
39	Makushin Volcano	Unalaska Island	5,905 ft 1800 m	5,905 ft 1800 m	83.1 mi 133.8 km	53.8782°N 166.9299°W
40	Sovereign Mountain	Talkeetna Mountains	8,849 ft 2697 m	5,874 ft 1790 m	45.6 mi 73.5 km	62.1311°N 148.6044°W
41	Isanotski Peaks	Unimak Island	8,106 ft 2471 m	5,856 ft 1785 m	9.71 mi 15.62 km	54.7680°N 163.7291°W
42	Isthmus Peak	Kenai Mountains	6,532 ft 1991 m	5,782 ft 1762 m	32.3 mi 52 km	60.5772°N 148.8915°W
43	Frosty Peak Volcano	Aleutian Range	5,803 ft 1769 m	5,753 ft 1754 m	35.4 mi 56.9 km	55.0672°N 162.8351°W
44	Great Sitkin Volcano	Great Sitkin Island	5,710 ft 1740 m	5,710 ft 1740 m	87.8 mi 141.3 km	52.0763°N 176.1108°W
45	Mount Cleveland (Note: The summit of Mount Cleveland is the highest point of Chuginadak Island.)	Chuginadak Island	5,675 ft 1730 m	5,675 ft 1730 m	56.3 mi 90.6 km	52.8230°N 169.9465°W
46	Mount Wrangell	Wrangell Mountains	14,163 ft 4317 m	5,613 ft 1711 m	14.79 mi 23.8 km	62.0059°N 144.0187°W
47	Devils Paw	Coast Mountains	8,507 ft 2593 m	5,587 ft 1703 m	84.7 mi 136.3 km	58.7289°N 133.8402°W
48	Mount Seattle	Saint Elias Mountains	10,350 ft 3155 m	5,561 ft 1695 m	11.97 mi 19.26 km	60.0680°N 139.1893°W
49	Mount Russell	Alaska Range	11,670 ft 3557 m	5,520 ft 1682 m	14.07 mi 22.7 km	62.7984°N 151.8845°W
50	Mount Foresta	Saint Elias Mountains	11,050 ft 3368 m	5,400 ft 1646 m	12.51 mi 20.1 km	60.1912°N 139.4323°W
51	Veniaminof Peak (Note: The summit of Veniaminof Peak is the highest point of Baranof Island.)	Baranof Island	5,390 ft 1643 m	5,390 ft 1643 m	79.7 mi 128.3 km	57.0151°N 134.9882°W
52	Bearhole Peak	Saint Elias Mountains	8,517 ft 2596 m	5,367 ft 1636 m	9.71 mi 15.62 km	60.9283°N 142.5237°W
53	Mount Steller	Chugach Mountains	10,515 ft 3205 m	5,365 ft 1635 m	22.5 mi 36.2 km	60.5199°N 143.0932°W
54	Mount Miller	Chugach Mountains	10,750 ft 3277 m	5,300 ft 1615 m	40.3 mi 64.9 km	60.4605°N 142.3012°W
55	Carlisle Volcano (Note: The summit of Carlisle Volcano is the highest point of Carlisle Island.)	Carlisle Island	5,283 ft 1610 m	5,283 ft 1610 m	6.64 mi 10.68 km	52.8913°N 170.0580°W
56	Bashful Peak	Chugach Mountains	8,005 ft 2440 m	5,275 ft 1608 m	22.1 mi 35.5 km	61.3076°N 148.8697°W
57	Tetlin Peak	Alaska Range	8,365 ft 2550 m	5,240 ft 1597 m	25.5 mi 41.1 km	62.6215°N 143.1084°W
58	Mount Deborah	Alaska Range	12,339 ft 3761 m	5,189 ft 1582 m	16.08 mi 25.9 km	63.6377°N 147.2384°W
59	Necons Peak (Peak 8336)	Alaska Range	8,336 ft 2541 m	5,186 ft 1581 m	21.9 mi 35.3 km	61.1125°N 153.4690°W
60	Gareloi Volcano (Note: The summit of Gareloi Volcano is the highest point of Gareloi Island.)	Gareloi Island	5,160 ft 1573 m	5,160 ft 1573 m	28.6 mi 46.1 km	51.7880°N 178.7940°W
61	Stony Peak (Peak 8488)	Alaska Range	8,488 ft 2587 m	5,138 ft 1566 m	11.92 mi 19.19 km	61.4950°N 153.6224°W
62	Mount Augusta	Saint Elias Mountains	14,070 ft 4289 m	5,082 ft 1549 m	14.41 mi 23.2 km	60.3074°N 140.4584°W
63	Copper Peak (Peak 6915)	Chugach Mountains	6,915 ft 2108 m	5,065 ft 1544 m	11.1 mi 17.87 km	61.3297°N 144.9599°W
64	Mount Bear	Saint Elias Mountains	14,831 ft 4520 m	5,054 ft 1540 m	20.1 mi 32.4 km	61.2834°N 141.1433°W
65	Korovin Volcano (Note: The summit of Korovin Volcano is the highest point of Atka Island.)	Atka Island	5,030 ft 1533 m	5,030 ft 1533 m	85.2 mi 137.2 km	52.3816°N 174.1653°W
66	Kootznoowoo Peak (Note: The summit of Kootznoowoo Peak is the highest point of Admiralty Island.)	Admiralty Island	4,850 ft 1478 m	4,850 ft 1478 m	35.7 mi 57.5 km	57.7891°N 134.4546°W
67	Cleave Peak (Peak 7500)	Chugach Mountains	7,550 ft 2301 m	4,779 ft 1457 m	11.86 mi 19.08 km	61.1256°N 145.3006°W
68	Mount Jarvis	Wrangell Mountains	13,421 ft 4091 m	4,771 ft 1454 m	11.15 mi 17.95 km	62.0234°N 143.6198°W
69	Chunekukleik Mountain	Saint Elias Mountains	5,780 ft 1762 m	4,730 ft 1442 m	7.61 mi 12.24 km	59.2919°N 135.9529°W
70	Double Peak	Chigmit Mountains	6,818 ft 2078 m	4,701 ft 1433 m	17.75 mi 28.6 km	60.7296°N 152.5861°W
71	Mount Aylesworth	Saint Elias Mountains	9,285 ft 2830 m	4,659 ft 1420 m	16.81 mi 27.1 km	59.9242°N 138.7985°W
72	Mount Hunter	Alaska Range	14,573 ft 4442 m	4,653 ft 1418 m	6.88 mi 11.07 km	62.9504°N 151.0915°W
73	Mount Reid (Note: The summit of Mount Reid is the highest point of Revillagigedo Island.)	Revillagigedo Island	4,592 ft 1400 m	4,592 ft 1400 m	23.3 mi 37.5 km	55.7065°N 131.2472°W
74	Mount Leeper (Note: The summit of Mount Leeper is the highest point of the Robinson Mountains, subrange of Chugach Mountains.)	Chugach Mountains	9,603 ft 2927 m	4,544 ft 1385 m	13.52 mi 21.8 km	60.2860°N 142.1031°W
75	Kates Needle	Coast Mountains	10,016 ft 3053 m	4,537 ft 1383 m	26 mi 41.8 km	57.0449°N 132.0451°W
76	Koniag Peak (Note: The summit of Koniag Peak is the highest point of Kodiak Island.)	Kodiak Island	4,520 ft 1378 m	4,520 ft 1378 m	84.2 mi 135.5 km	57.3548°N 153.3235°W
77	Dillingham High Point (Note: The summit of Dillingham High Point is the highest point of the Kuskokwim Mountains.)	Kuskokwim Mountains	5,250 ft 1600 m	4,475 ft 1364 m	193.3 mi 311 km	60.1159°N 159.3241°W
78	Regal Mountain	Wrangell Mountains	13,845 ft 4220 m	4,395 ft 1340 m	12.25 mi 19.72 km	61.7438°N 142.8675°W
79	Mount Osborn (Note: The summit of Mount Osborn is the highest point of the Seward Peninsula.)	Seward Peninsula	4,714 ft 1437 m	4,377 ft 1334 m	282 mi 454 km	64.9922°N 165.3294°W
80	Herbert Volcan (Note: The summit of Herbert Volcan is the highest point of Herbert Island.)	Herbert Island	4,300 ft 1311 m	4,300 ft 1311 m	9.07 mi 14.59 km	52.7405°N 170.1142°W
81	Mount Kanaga (Note: The summit of Mount Kanaga is the highest point of Kanaga Island.)	Kanaga Island	4,287 ft 1307 m	4,287 ft 1307 m	42 mi 67.6 km	51.9238°N 177.1623°W
82	Mount Akutan (Note: The summit of Mount Akutan is the highest point of Akutan Island.)	Akutan Island	4,251 ft 1296 m	4,251 ft 1296 m	42.3 mi 68.1 km	54.1330°N 165.9854°W
83	Accomplishment Peak	Brooks Range	8,045 ft 2452 m	4,195 ft 1279 m	86.5 mi 139.2 km	68.4433°N 148.0947°W
84	Mount Tozi (Note: The summit of Mount Tozi is the highest point of the Ray Mountains.)	Ray Mountains	5,519 ft 1682 m	4,169 ft 1271 m	99.6 mi 160.3 km	65.6865°N 150.9498°W
85	Mount Chamberlin	Brooks Range	8,901 ft 2713 m	4,151 ft 1265 m	27.3 mi 43.9 km	69.2775°N 144.9107°W
86	Augustine Volcano (Note: The summit of Augustine Volcano is the highest point of Augustine Island.)	Augustine Island	4,025 ft 1227 m	4,025 ft 1227 m	35 mi 56.3 km	59.3622°N 153.4330°W
87	Mount Salisbury	Saint Elias Mountains	12,170 ft 3709 m	4,020 ft 1225 m	3.04 mi 4.9 km	58.8505°N 137.3719°W
88	Anvil Peak (Note: The summit of Anvil Peak is the highest point of Semisopochnoi Island and the Rat Islands.)	Semisopochnoi Island	4,007 ft 1221 m	4,007 ft 1221 m	70 mi 112.6 km	51.9859°N 179.6021°E
89	Kiska Volcano (Note: The summit of Kiska Volcano is the highest point of Kiska Island.)	Kiska Island	4,004 ft 1220 m	4,004 ft 1220 m	85.6 mi 137.8 km	52.1027°N 177.6030°E
90	Prince of Wales Island High Point	Prince of Wales Island	3,996 ft 1218 m	3,996 ft 1218 m	56.3 mi 90.6 km	55.5373°N 132.8773°W
91	Mount Moffit	Alaska Range	13,020 ft 3969 m	3,970 ft 1210 m	10.2 mi 16.41 km	63.5683°N 146.3982°W
92	Etolin Island High Point	Etolin Island	3,960 ft 1207 m	3,960 ft 1207 m	22.5 mi 36.2 km	56.1196°N 132.3253°W
93	Sherman Peak (Note: The summit of Sherman Peak is the highest point of Kupreanof Island.)	Kupreanof Island	3,950 ft 1204 m	3,950 ft 1204 m	14.27 mi 23 km	56.8969°N 133.0476°W
94	Mount Moffett (Note: The summit of Mount Moffett is the highest point of Adak Island.)	Adak Island	3,924 ft 1196 m	3,924 ft 1196 m	18.03 mi 29 km	51.9363°N 176.7409°W
95	Chichagof Island High Point	Chichagof Island	3,909 ft 1191 m	3,909 ft 1191 m	23.5 mi 37.9 km	57.8149°N 135.1801°W
96	Segula Peak (Note: The summit of Segula Peak is the highest point of Segula Island.)	Segula Island	3,817 ft 1163 m	3,817 ft 1163 m	23.5 mi 37.8 km	52.0147°N 178.1356°E
97	Chagulak Volcano (Note: The summit of Chagulak Volcano is the highest point of Chagulak Island.)	Chagulak Island	3,750 ft 1143 m	3,750 ft 1143 m	44.6 mi 71.9 km	52.5711°N 171.1388°W
98	Lituya Mountain	Saint Elias Mountains	11,924 ft 3634 m	3,674 ft 1120 m	3.9 mi 6.27 km	58.8054°N 137.4367°W
99	Tamgas Mountain (Note: The summit of Tamgas Mountain is the highest point of Annette Island.)	Annette Island	3,591 ft 1095 m	3,591 ft 1095 m	33.3 mi 53.6 km	55.0660°N 131.4077°W
100	Kuiu Island High Point	Kuiu Island	3,542 ft 1080 m	3,542 ft 1080 m	14.69 mi 23.6 km	56.8031°N 134.3800°W

== Most isolated major summits ==
Of the 50 most isolated major summits of Alaska, only Denali exceeds 1000 kilometers (621 miles) of topographic isolation, four peaks exceed 500 kilometers (310.7 miles), 16 peaks exceed 200 kilometers (124.3 miles), and 38 peaks exceed 100 kilometers (62.14 miles) of topographic isolation. Two of these peaks lie on the international border with British Columbia.

The 50 most topographically isolated summits of Alaska with at least 500 meters of topographic prominence
Rank	Mountain peak	Mountain range	Elevation	Prominence	Isolation	Location
1	Denali	Alaska Range	20,310 ft 6190.5 m	20,146 ft 6141 m	4,630 mi 7,451 km	63.0690°N 151.0063°W
2	Shishaldin Volcano	Unimak Island	9,414 ft 2869 m	9,414 ft 2869 m	545 mi 877 km	54.7554°N 163.9709°W
3	Tanaga Volcano	Tanaga Island	5,925 ft 1806 m	5,925 ft 1806 m	408 mi 656 km	51.8838°N 178.1429°W
4	Mount Isto	Brooks Range	8,976 ft 2736 m	7,901 ft 2408 m	394 mi 634 km	69.2025°N 143.8020°W
5	Mount Osborn	Seward Peninsula	4,714 ft 1437 m	4,377 ft 1334 m	282 mi 454 km	64.9922°N 165.3294°W
6	Mount Igikpak	Brooks Range	8,276 ft 2523 m	6,126 ft 1867 m	282 mi 453 km	67.4129°N 154.9656°W
7	Mount Vsevidof	Umnak Island	7,051 ft 2149 m	7,051 ft 2149 m	223 mi 359 km	53.1256°N 168.6938°W
8	Mount Veniaminof	Alaska Peninsula	8,225 ft 2507 m	8,200 ft 2499 m	210 mi 337 km	56.2194°N 159.2975°W
9	Dillingham High Point	Kuskokwim Mountains	5,250 ft 1600 m	4,475 ft 1364 m	193.3 mi 311 km	60.1159°N 159.3241°W
10	Hall Island High Point	Hall Island	1,665 ft 507 m	1,665 ft 507 m	193 mi 311 km	60.6647°N 173.0887°W
11	Peak 4030 (Note: The summit of Peak 4030 is the highest point of the Nulato Hills.)	Nulato Hills	4,030 ft 1228 m	1,640 ft 500 m	158.2 mi 255 km	64.4535°N 159.4152°W
12	Tooth Benchmark (Note: The summit of Tooth Benchmark is the highest point of Saint Lawrence Island and all the Bering Sea Islands.)	Saint Lawrence Island	2,207 ft 673 m	2,207 ft 673 m	154.6 mi 249 km	63.5920°N 170.3804°W
13	Mount Griggs	Alaska Peninsula	7,650 ft 2332 m	7,300 ft 2225 m	136.3 mi 219 km	58.3534°N 155.0958°W
14	Mount Hayes	Alaska Range	13,832 ft 4216 m	11,507 ft 3507 m	127.2 mi 205 km	63.6203°N 146.7178°W
15	Mount Marcus Baker	Chugach Mountains	13,176 ft 4016 m	10,751 ft 3277 m	126.8 mi 204 km	61.4374°N 147.7525°W
16	Mount Fairweather (Fairweather Mountain)	Saint Elias Mountains	15,325 ft 4671 m	12,995 ft 3961 m	124.7 mi 201 km	58.9064°N 137.5265°W
17	Black Mountain (Note: The summit of Black Mountain is the highest point of the De Long Mountains.)	Brooks Range	5,020 ft 1530 m	3,346 ft 1020 m	106 mi 170.6 km	68.5598°N 160.3281°W
18	Mount Tozi	Ray Mountains	5,519 ft 1682 m	4,169 ft 1271 m	99.6 mi 160.3 km	65.6865°N 150.9498°W
19	Mount Torbert	Alaska Range	11,413 ft 3479 m	8,688 ft 2648 m	97.8 mi 157.3 km	61.4086°N 152.4125°W
20	Mount Chiginagak	Aleutian Range	6,925 ft 2111 m	6,675 ft 2035 m	97.7 mi 157.2 km	57.1334°N 156.9912°W
21	Pavlof Volcano	Alaska Peninsula	8,250 ft 2515 m	8,200 ft 2499 m	94.3 mi 151.8 km	55.4173°N 161.8932°W
22	Truuli Peak	Kenai Mountains	6,612 ft 2015 m	6,062 ft 1848 m	88.9 mi 143.1 km	59.9129°N 150.4348°W
23	Great Sitkin Volcano	Great Sitkin Island	5,710 ft 1740 m	5,710 ft 1740 m	87.8 mi 141.3 km	52.0763°N 176.1108°W
24	Accomplishment Peak	Brooks Range	8,045 ft 2452 m	4,195 ft 1279 m	86.5 mi 139.2 km	68.4433°N 148.0947°W
25	Kiska Volcano	Kiska Island	4,004 ft 1220 m	4,004 ft 1220 m	85.6 mi 137.8 km	52.1027°N 177.6030°E
26	Korovin Volcano	Atka Island	5,030 ft 1533 m	5,030 ft 1533 m	85.2 mi 137.2 km	52.3816°N 174.1653°W
27	Devils Paw	Coast Mountains	8,507 ft 2593 m	5,587 ft 1703 m	84.7 mi 136.3 km	58.7289°N 133.8402°W
28	Koniag Peak	Kodiak Island	4,520 ft 1378 m	4,520 ft 1378 m	84.2 mi 135.5 km	57.3548°N 153.3235°W
29	Makushin Volcano	Unalaska Island	5,905 ft 1800 m	5,905 ft 1800 m	83.1 mi 133.8 km	53.8782°N 166.9299°W
30	Veniaminof Peak	Baranof Island	5,390 ft 1643 m	5,390 ft 1643 m	79.7 mi 128.3 km	57.0151°N 134.9882°W
31	Blackburn Hills	Nulato Hills	3,295 ft 1004 m	1,640 ft 500 m	73.9 mi 118.9 km	63.4107°N 159.6559°W
32	Buldir Volcano (Note: The summit of Buldir Volcano is the highest point of Buldir Island.)	Buldir Island	2,152 ft 656 m	2,152 ft 656 m	73.8 mi 118.7 km	52.3482°N 175.9105°E
33	Mount Tom White	Chugach Mountains	11,191 ft 3411 m	7,641 ft 2329 m	73 mi 117.6 km	60.6518°N 143.6972°W
34	Anvil Peak	Semisopochnoi Island	4,007 ft 1221 m	4,007 ft 1221 m	70 mi 112.6 km	51.9859°N 179.6021°E
35	Kusilvak High Point	Nulato Hills	2,905 ft 885 m	1,830 ft 558 m	65.7 mi 105.8 km	62.9285°N 161.7461°W
36	Mount Harper	Yukon–Tanana uplands	6,543 ft 1994 m	1,640 ft 500 m	63.8 mi 102.7 km	64.2370°N 143.8442°W
37	Mount Angayukaqsraq (Note: The summit of Mount Angayukaqsraq is the highest point of the Baird Mountains.)	Brooks Range	4,750 ft 1448 m	3,500 ft 1067 m	63.6 mi 102.4 km	67.7083°N 159.4053°W
38	Mount Prindle	Yukon–Tanana uplands	5,286 ft 1611 m	2,836 ft 864 m	62.9 mi 101.2 km	65.4610°N 146.4758°W
39	Pyre Peak (Note: The summit of Pyre Peak is the highest point of Seguam Island.)	Seguam Island	3,458 ft 1054 m	3,458 ft 1054 m	60.7 mi 97.7 km	52.3159°N 172.5106°W
40	Mount Blackburn	Wrangell Mountains	16,390 ft 4996 m	11,640 ft 3548 m	60.7 mi 97.6 km	61.7305°N 143.4031°W
41	Redoubt Volcano	Chigmit Mountains	10,197 ft 3108 m	9,147 ft 2788 m	58.7 mi 94.5 km	60.4854°N 152.7442°W
42	Mooseheart Mountain	Kuskokwim Mountains	2,136 ft 651 m	1,640 ft 500 m	58.5 mi 94.1 km	64.7452°N 151.0514°W
43	Mount Hesperus	Alaska Range	9,828 ft 2996 m	6,978 ft 2127 m	58.1 mi 93.5 km	61.8036°N 154.1469°W
44	Mount Cleveland	Chuginadak Island	5,675 ft 1730 m	5,675 ft 1730 m	56.3 mi 90.6 km	52.8230°N 169.9465°W
44	Prince of Wales Island High Point	Prince of Wales Island	3,996 ft 1218 m	3,996 ft 1218 m	56.3 mi 90.6 km	55.5373°N 132.8773°W
46	Mount Kimball	Alaska Range	10,350 ft 3155 m	7,425 ft 2263 m	55.8 mi 89.8 km	63.2390°N 144.6419°W
47	Mount Bona	Saint Elias Mountains	16,550 ft 5044 m	6,900 ft 2103 m	49.7 mi 80 km	61.3856°N 141.7495°W
48	Peak 4085	Kobuk-Koyukuk Ranges	4,085 ft 1245 m	1,640 ft 500 m	49.4 mi 79.5 km	66.2398°N 156.0071°W
49	Sovereign Mountain	Talkeetna Mountains	8,849 ft 2697 m	5,874 ft 1790 m	45.6 mi 73.5 km	62.1311°N 148.6044°W
50	Chagulak Volcano	Chagulak Island	3,750 ft 1143 m	3,750 ft 1143 m	44.6 mi 71.9 km	52.5711°N 171.1388°W

== Gallery ==
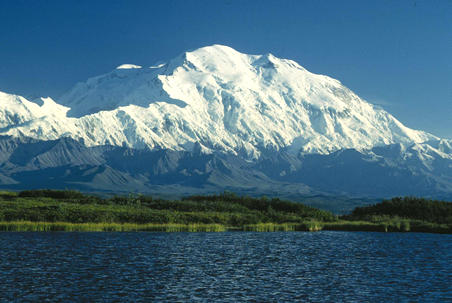
Denali is the highest mountain peak of the State of Alaska, the United States of America, and all of North America.

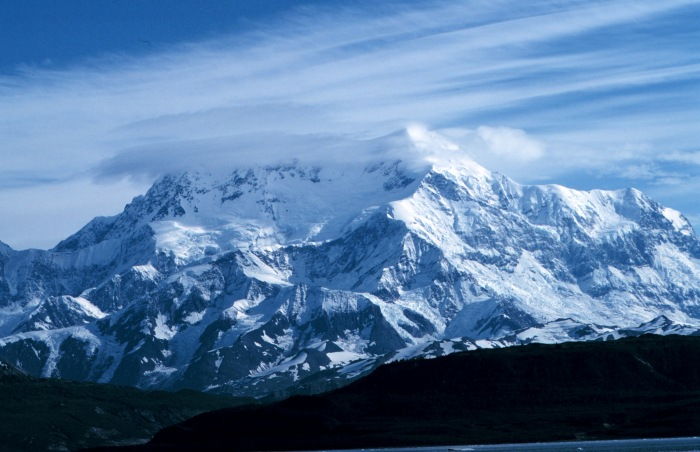
Mount Saint Elias on the boundary between Alaska and the Yukon is the second highest peak of both the United States and Canada.

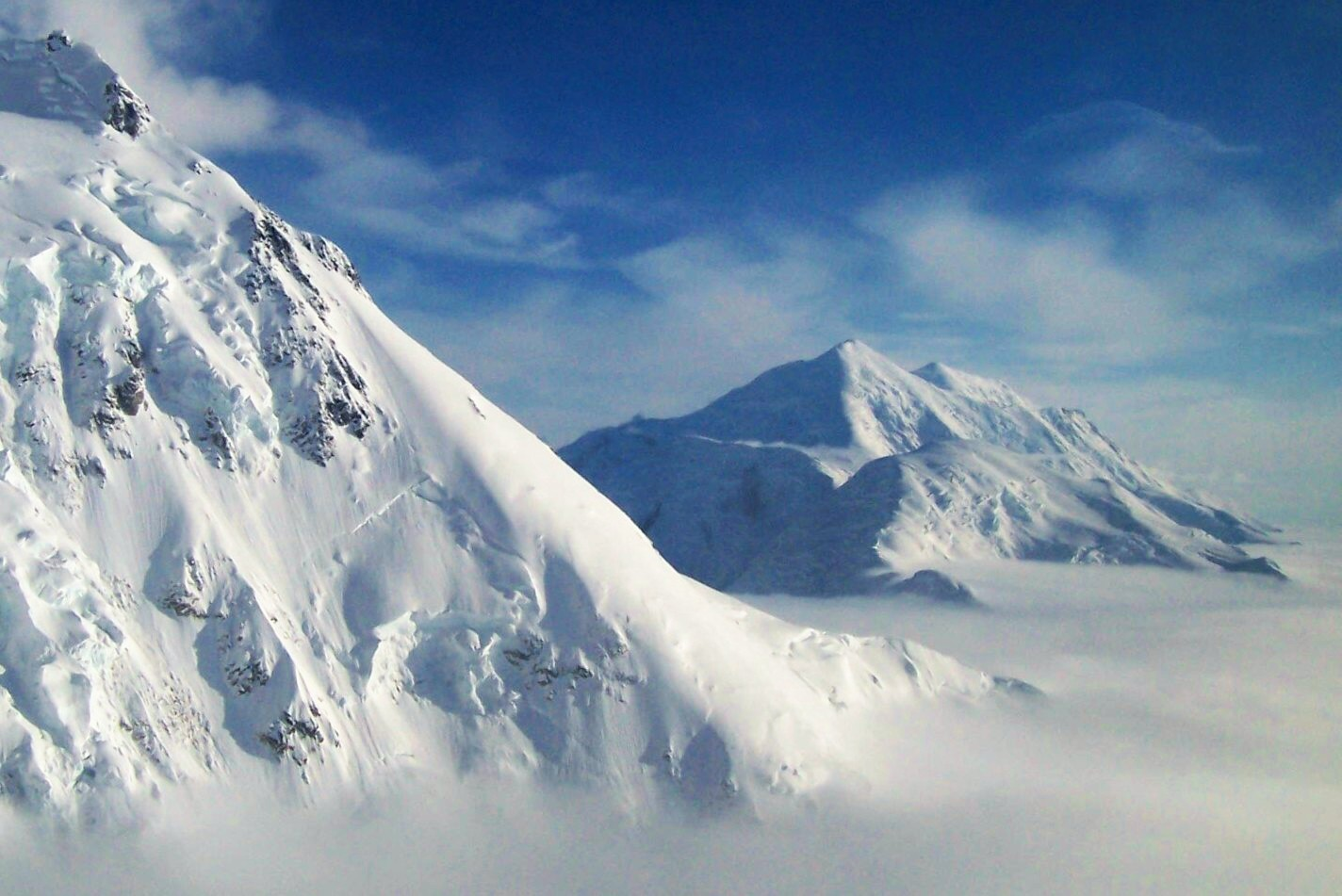
Mount Foraker is the third highest major mountain peak of Alaska.

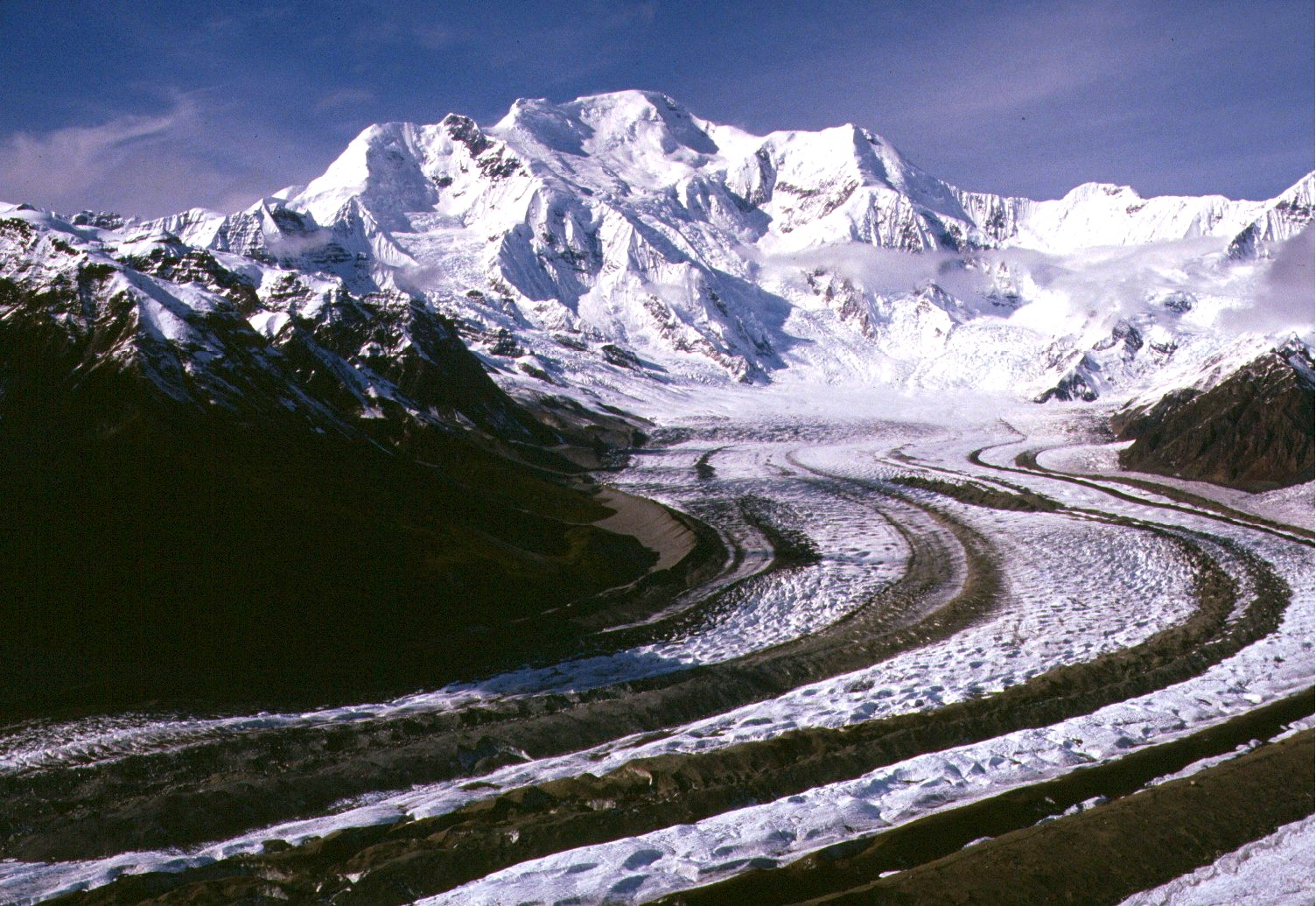
Mount Blackburn is the highest peak of the Wrangell Mountains.

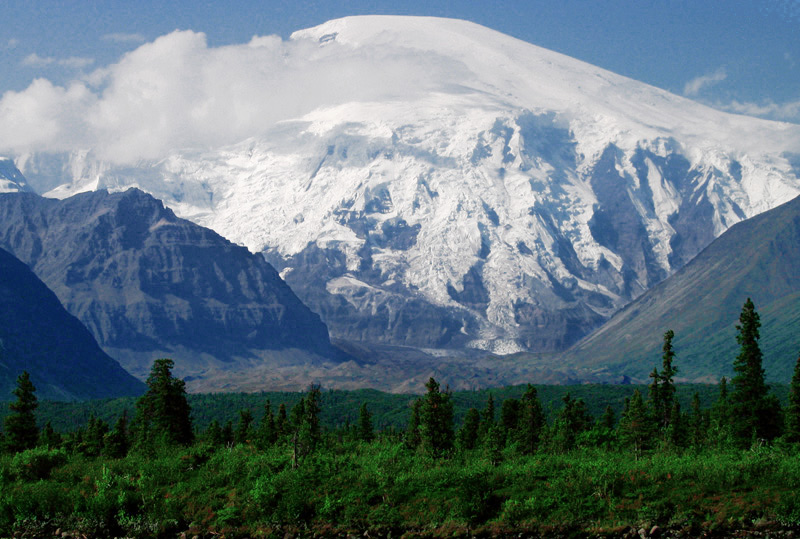
Mount Sanford is the second highest peak of the Wrangell Mountains.

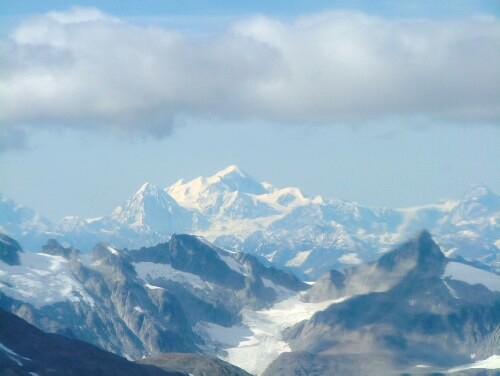
Mount Fairweather on the boundary between Alaska and British Columbia is the second most topographically prominent mountain peak of Alaska.

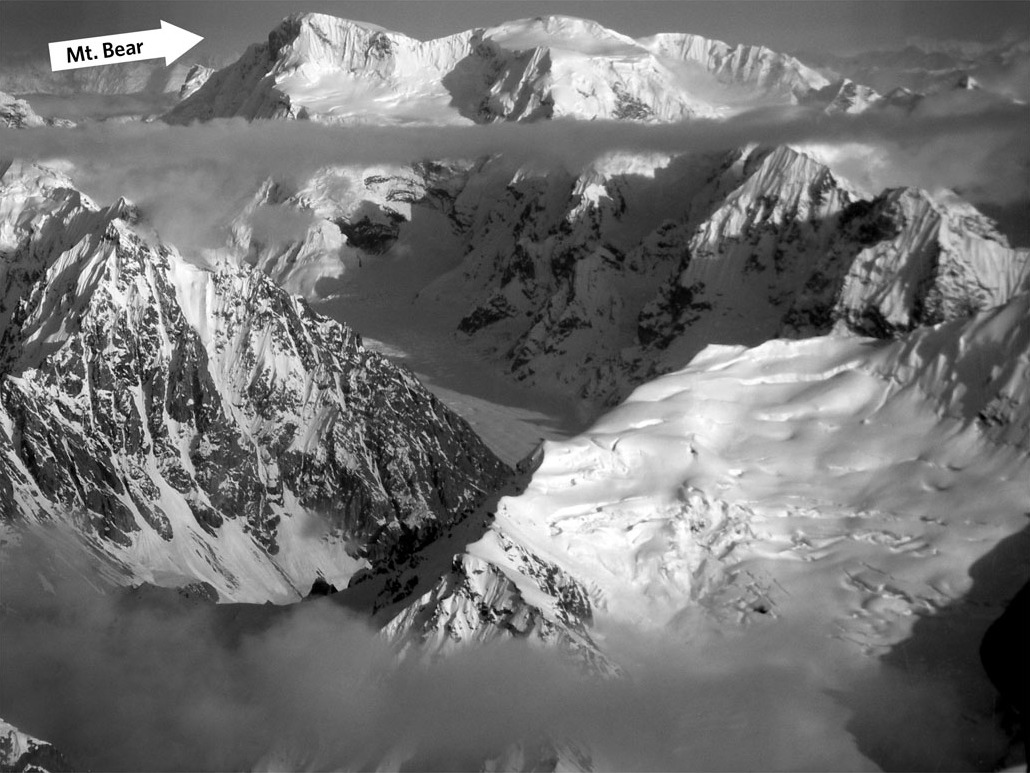
Mount Bear in the Saint Elias Mountains.

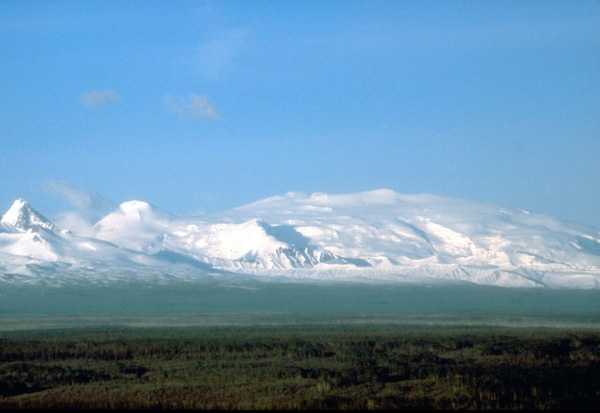
The massive shield volcano Mount Wrangell in the Wrangell Mountains.

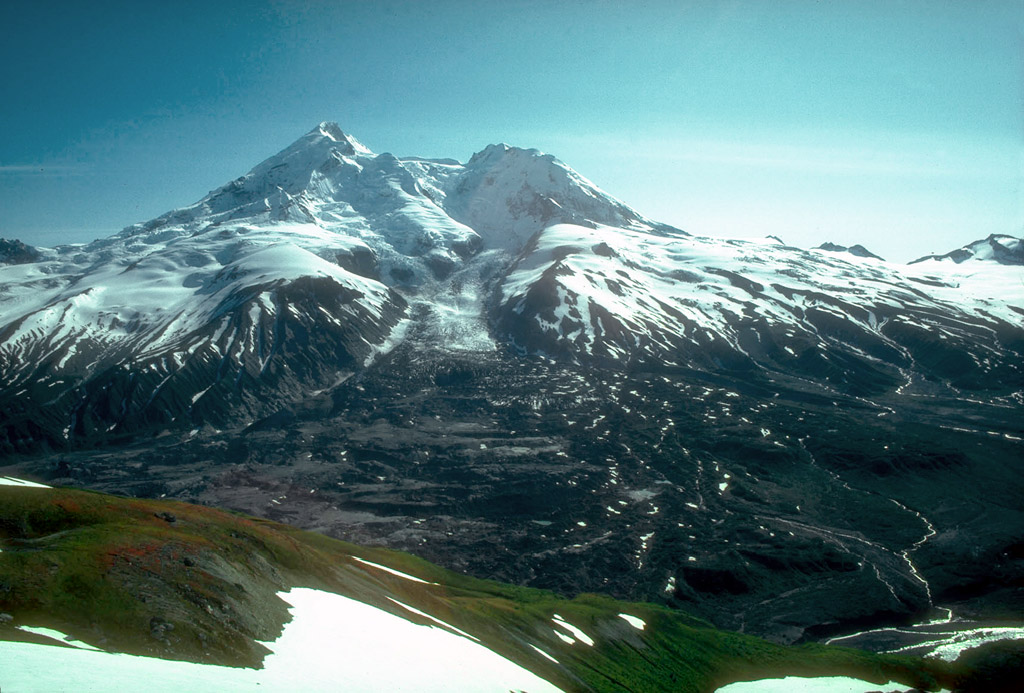
The active volcano Mount Redoubt is the highest summit of the Aleutian Range.

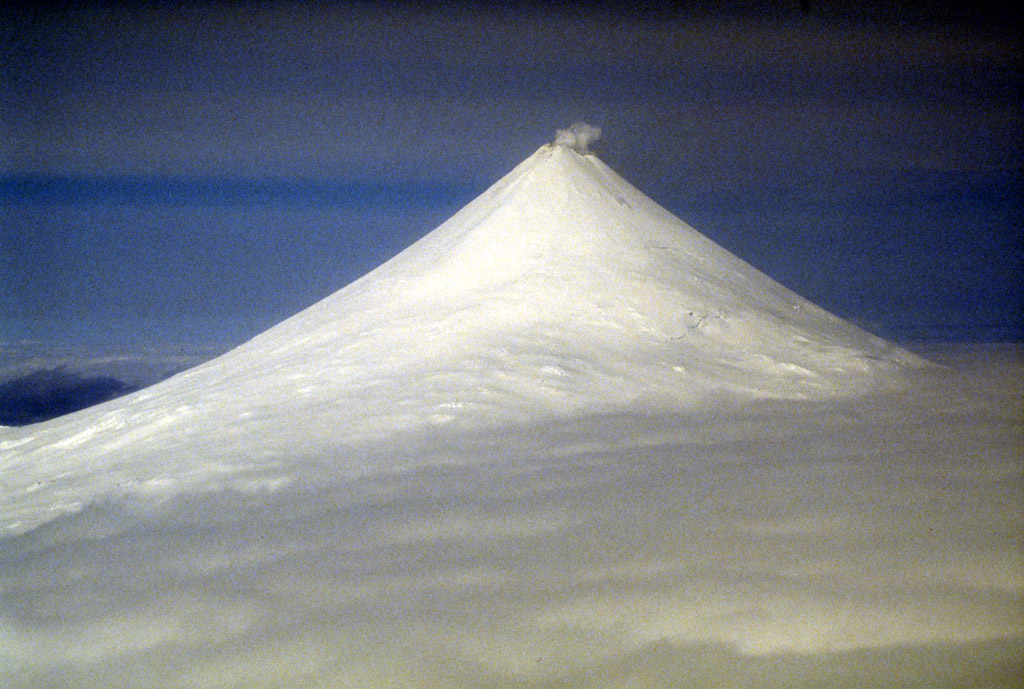
Mount Shishaldin on Unimak Island is the highest point in the Aleutian Islands.

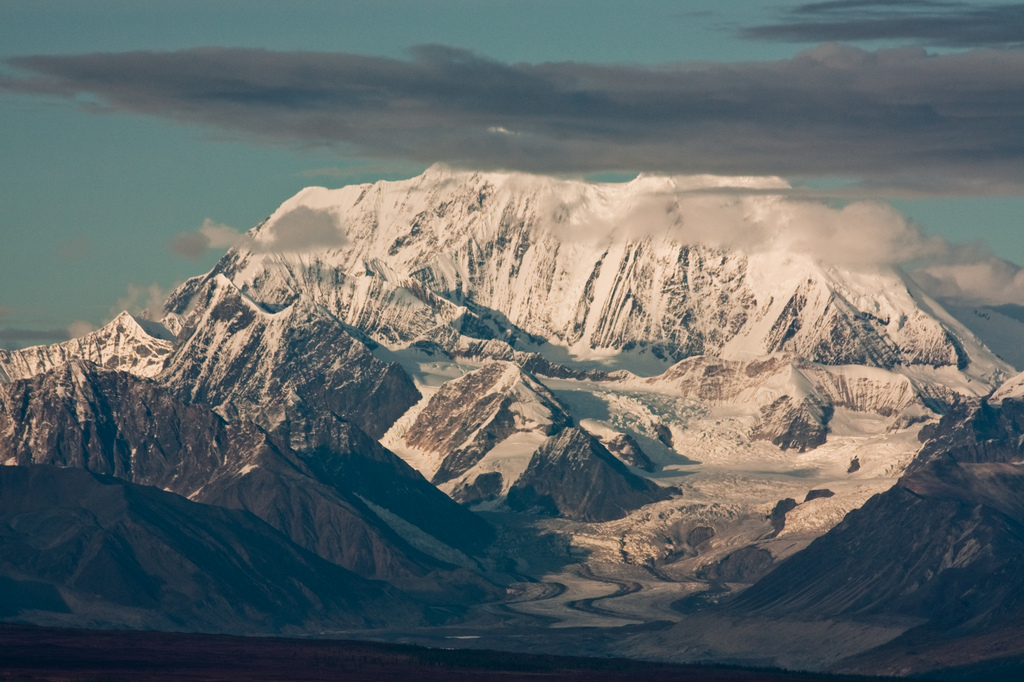
Mount Hayes is the highest mountain in the eastern Alaska Range and the sixth most prominent peak in Alaska.

== See also ==
- List of mountain peaks of North America
  - List of mountain peaks of Greenland
  - List of mountain peaks of Canada
  - List of mountain peaks of the Rocky Mountains
  - List of mountain peaks of the United States
    - List of mountain peaks of Alaska
      - List of mountains of the United States#Alaska
      - List of the major 4000-meter summits of Alaska
      - List of the ultra-prominent summits of Alaska
    - List of mountain peaks of Arizona
    - List of mountain peaks of California
    - List of mountain peaks of Colorado
    - List of mountain peaks of Hawaiʻi
    - List of mountain peaks of Idaho
    - List of mountain peaks of Montana
    - List of mountain peaks of Nevada
    - List of mountain peaks of New Mexico
    - List of mountain peaks of Oregon
    - List of mountain peaks of Utah
    - List of mountain peaks of Washington (state)
    - List of mountain peaks of Wyoming
  - List of mountain peaks of México
  - List of mountain peaks of Central America
  - List of mountain peaks of the Caribbean
- Alaska
  - Geography of Alaska
    - Category:Mountains of Alaska
      - commons:Category:Mountains of Alaska
- Physical geography
  - Topography
    - Topographic elevation
    - Topographic prominence
    - Topographic isolation
