= Mount Prindle =

Mountain in Alaska, United States

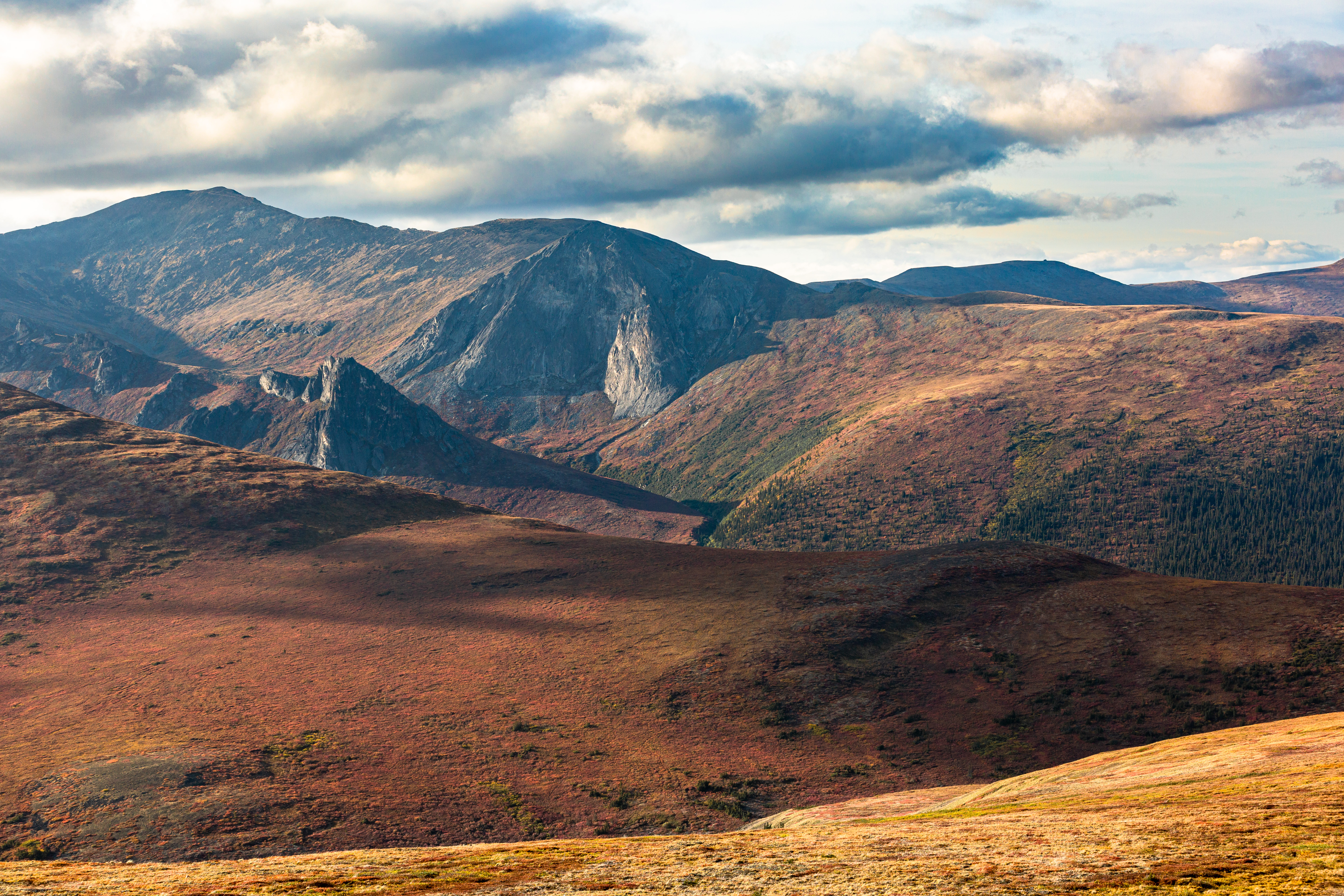
- Mount Prindle, east aspect

Highest point
- Elevation: 5,286 ft (1,611 m) NGVD 29
- Prominence: 2,786 ft (849 m)
- Coordinates: 65°27′39″N 146°28′32″W

Geography
- Location within Alaska
- Location: Yukon–Koyukuk Census Area, Alaska
- Topo map: USGS Circle B-5

Mount Prindle is a granitic mountain in the Yukon–Tanana uplands, and is located approximately 45 miles (72 km) north-northeast of Fairbanks, Alaska. The plutons that form the core of the Mount Prindle massif are Late Cretaceous or early Tertiary age. These plutons intruded older (Precambrian to Paleozoic) metamorphic rocks. Mount Prindle exhibits classic glacial landforms, unlike most of the surrounding Yukon–Tanana uplands. It is in the Circle Mining District and many of the surrounding creeks have been or are being mined for placer gold. The area has also been prospected for tin and rare earth minerals. Mine roads and hiking trails provide access to the mountain. A 900 feet (270 m) granite wall on an eastern spur of the massif is an attraction for rock climbers.

The mountain is named for Louis Marcus Prindle (1865–1956), a U.S. Geological Survey geologist, who worked in the Fairbanks, Circle, and Fortymile areas of Alaska from 1902 through 1911.

== See also ==
- List of mountain peaks of North America
  - List of mountain peaks of the United States
    - List of mountain peaks of Alaska
