= Mount Steller (Chugach Mountains) =

Mountain in Alaska, United States

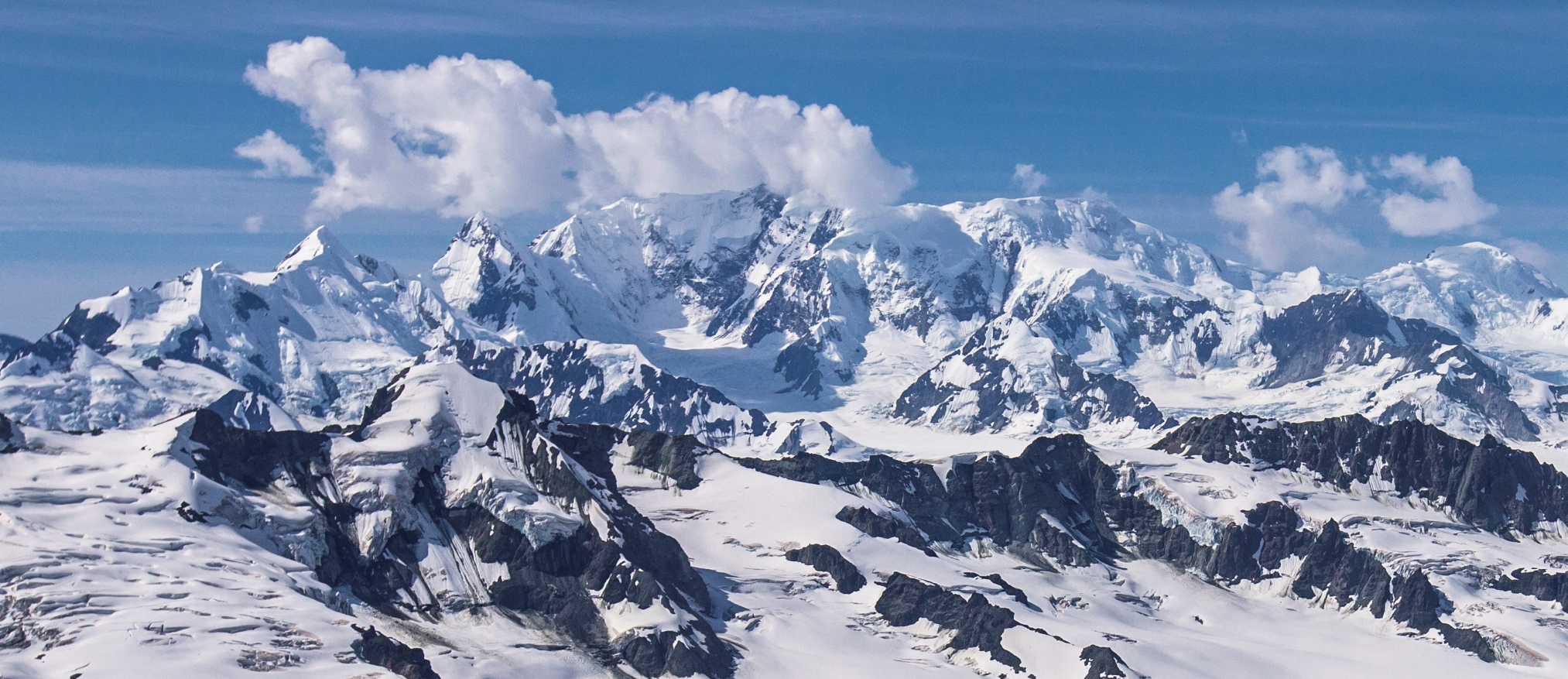
- Aerial view from northeast

Highest point
- Elevation: 10,715 ft (3,266 m)
- Prominence: 5,515 ft (1,681 m)
- Listing: US most prominent peaks 101st
- Coordinates: 60°31′13″N 143°05′27″W

Geography
- Location within Alaska
- Interactive map of Mount Steller
- Location: Yakutat City and Borough; Alaska U.S.
- Parent range: Chugach Mountains
- Topo map: USGS Bering Glacier C-6

Climbing
- First ascent: 1992 by B Jacobs, G Anderson, M Bowling, R Wesson

Mount Steller is a peak at the far eastern end of the Chugach Mountains of Alaska, United States. It is notable for its isolated location among extensive icefields, and for its large rise above local terrain. For example, it rises 8,000 feet (2,400 m) above the Bering Glacier to the south in about 4 horizontal miles (6.4 km).

Mount Steller is the high point of Waxell Ridge, an east–west trending ridge on the south side of the Bagley Icefield, one of the largest icefields in North America. The large Bering Glacier flows past the east and south slopes of the ridge, while the Steller Glacier flows from its west side.

The mountain was named for the naturalist Georg Wilhelm Steller.

Due to its isolated location, poor weather, and comparatively low absolute elevation by Alaskan standards, Mount Steller was not climbed until recently. The first ascent was in 1992.

== Climate ==
Based on the Köppen climate classification, Mount Steller is located in a subarctic climate zone with long, cold, snowy winters, and mild summers. Weather systems coming off the Gulf of Alaska are forced upwards by the Chugach Mountains (orographic lift), causing heavy precipitation in the form of rainfall and snowfall. Winter temperatures can drop below −20 °C with wind chill factors below −30 °C. The months May through June offer the most favorable weather for climbing or viewing.

== Gallery ==
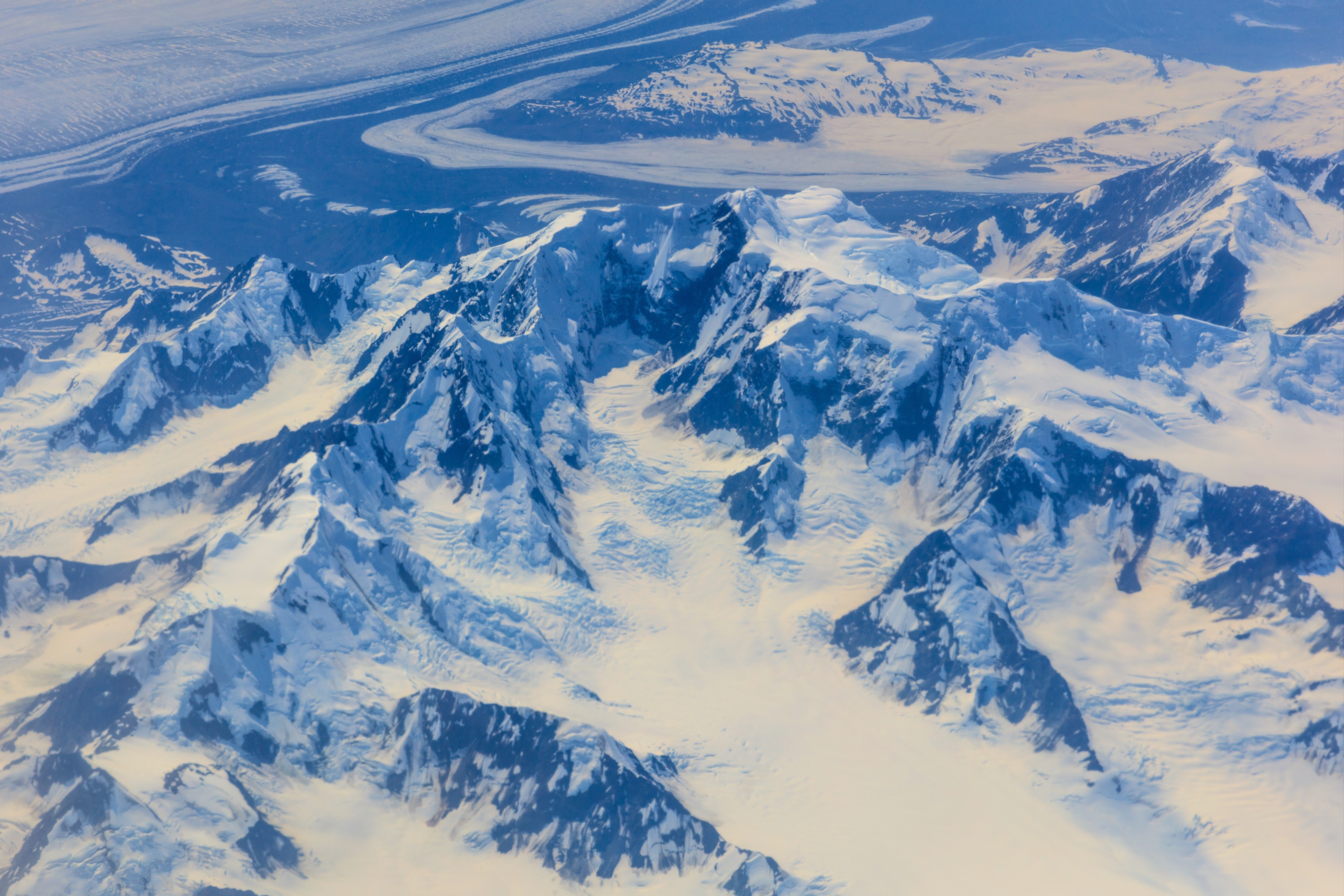
Mount Steller, looking southwest

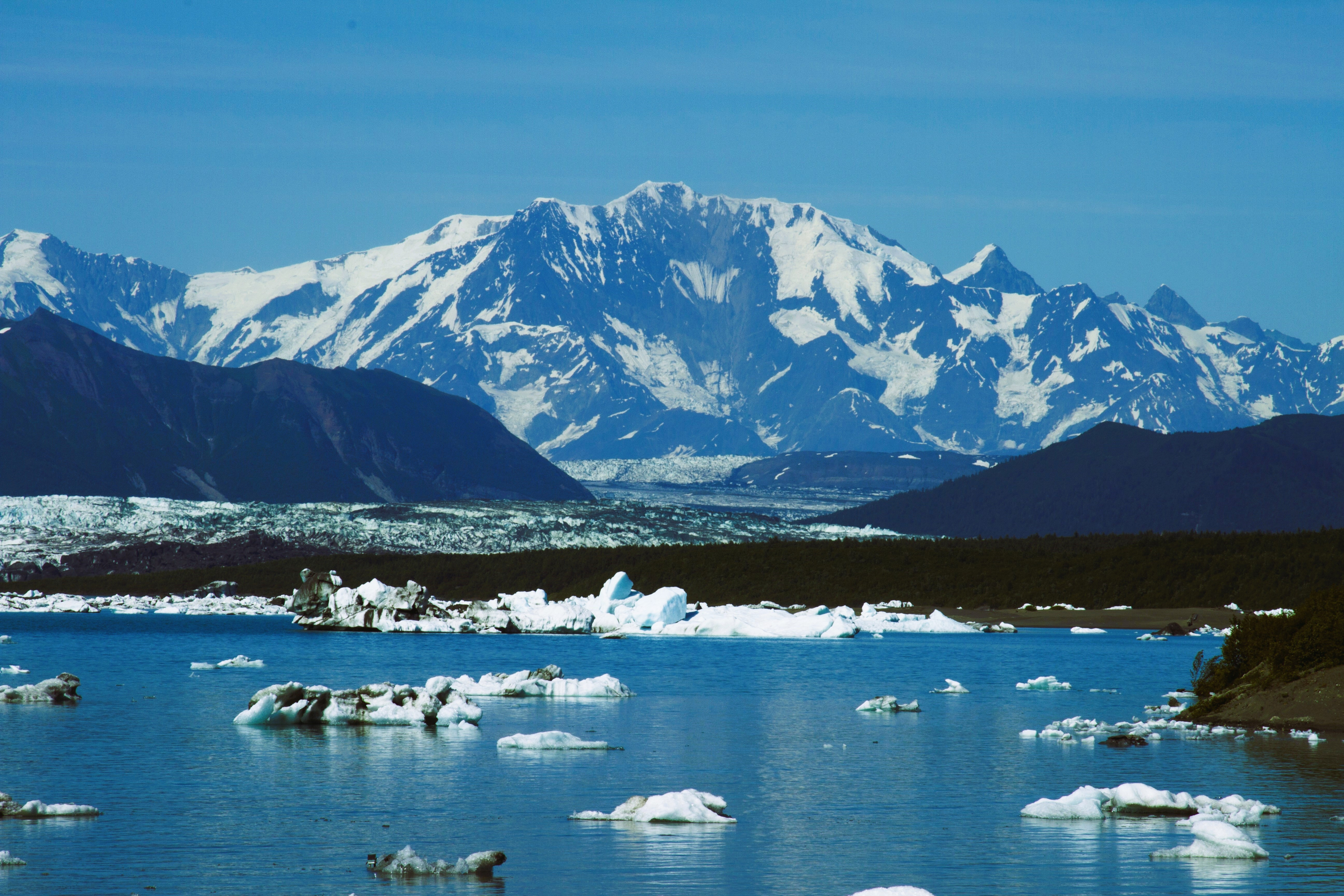
South aspect of Mount Steller

== See also ==
- List of mountain peaks of North America
  - List of mountain peaks of the United States
    - List of mountain peaks of Alaska
- List of Ultras of the United States
