= Mount Foresta =

Mountain in Alaska, United States

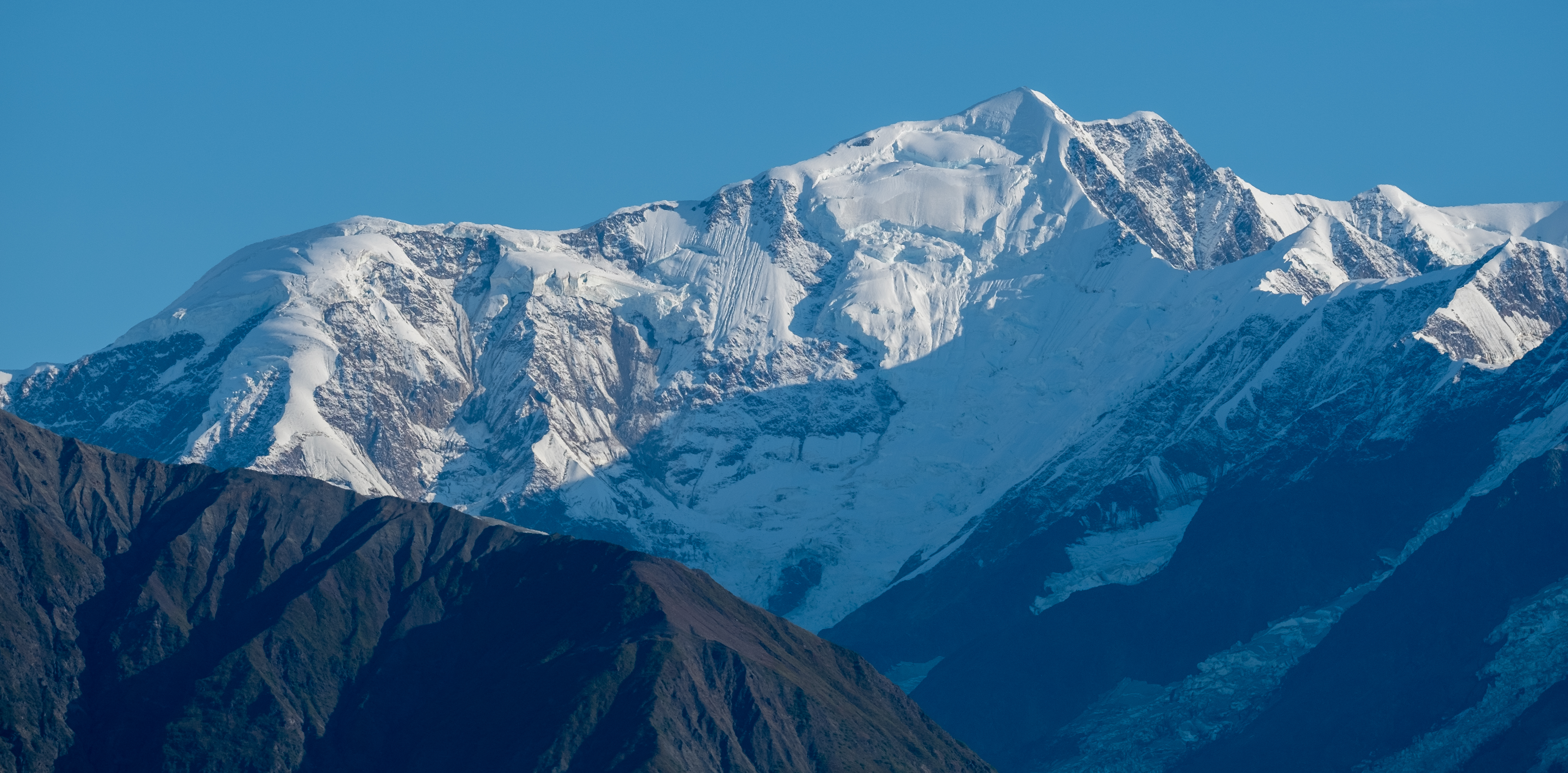
- South aspect, from Disenchantment Bay

Highest point
- Elevation: 11,000+ ft (3,350+ m)
- Prominence: 5,300 ft (1,615 m)
- Isolation: 12.48 mi (20.08 km)
- Listing: Ultras of the United States 95th
- Coordinates: 60°11′26″N 139°26′01″W

Geography
- Location within Alaska
- Interactive map of Mount Foresta
- Location: Wrangell–St. Elias National Park; Alaska, United States
- Parent range: Saint Elias Mountains
- Topo map: USGS Mount Saint Elias A-4

Climbing
- First ascent: 1979 Fred Beckey

Mount Foresta is an 11,000+ ft (3,350+ m) multi-peak massif located in Wrangell–St. Elias National Park, in the Saint Elias Mountains of Alaska in the United States. Rising high above the lower western margin of the Hubbard Glacier, the summit of Mount Foresta is just over nine miles (14 km) from tidewater at Disenchantment Bay, 12 mi (19 km) northwest of Mount Seattle, 14.5 mi (23 km) southeast of Mount Vancouver, and 46 mi (74 km) north of Yakutat.

== History ==
The mountain was named for Foresta Hodgson Wood (1904–1951), who was responsible for the logistics planning of the Project Snow Cornice of the Arctic Institute of North America. Foresta, with her daughter Valerie F. Wood (1933–1951), were killed in an airplane crash in the vicinity of this mountain on July 27, 1951, during this scientific expedition. The Valerie Glacier flows along the southwest aspect of Mount Foresta. The toponyms were proposed in 1957 by the Arctic Institute of North America and officially adopted in 1960 by the U.S. Board on Geographic Names.

The first ascent of Mount Foresta was made on July 24, 1979, by Fred Beckey, Rick Nolting, John Rupley, and Craig Tillery.

== Climate ==
Based on the Köppen climate classification, Mount Foresta is located in a subarctic climate zone with long, cold, snowy winters, and cool summers. Weather systems coming off the Gulf of Alaska are forced upwards by the Saint Elias Mountains (orographic lift), causing heavy precipitation in the form of rainfall and snowfall. Winter temperatures can drop below −20 °C with wind chill factors below −30 °C. The months May through June offer the most favorable weather for viewing and climbing.

== Gallery ==
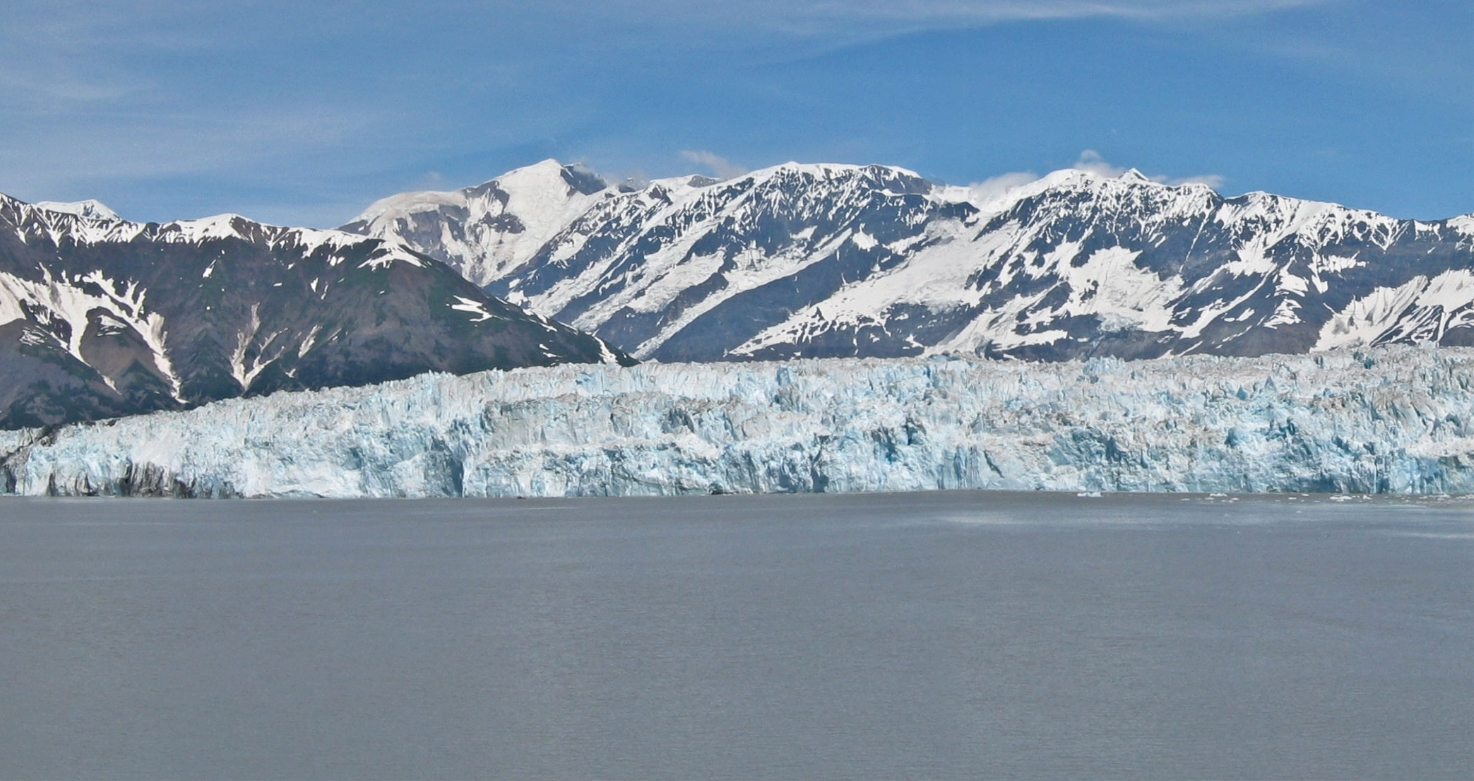
Mount Foresta seen from Disenchantment Bay with Hubbard Glacier

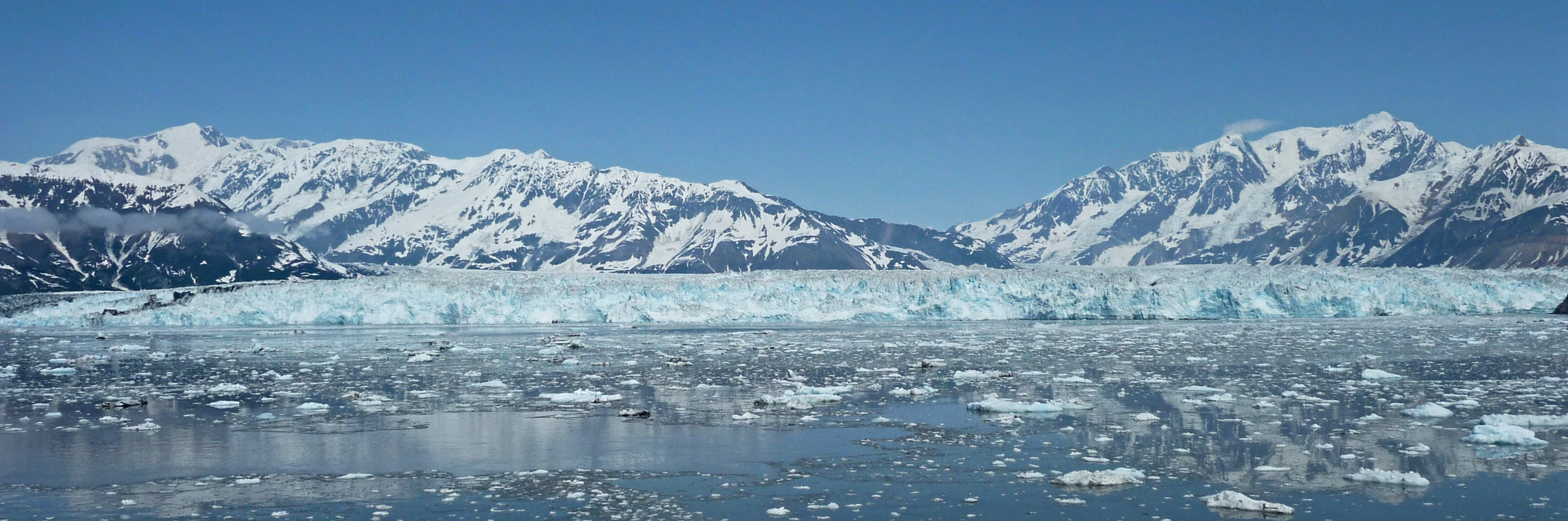
Mt. Foresta (left), Hubbard Glacier, Mt. Seattle (right)

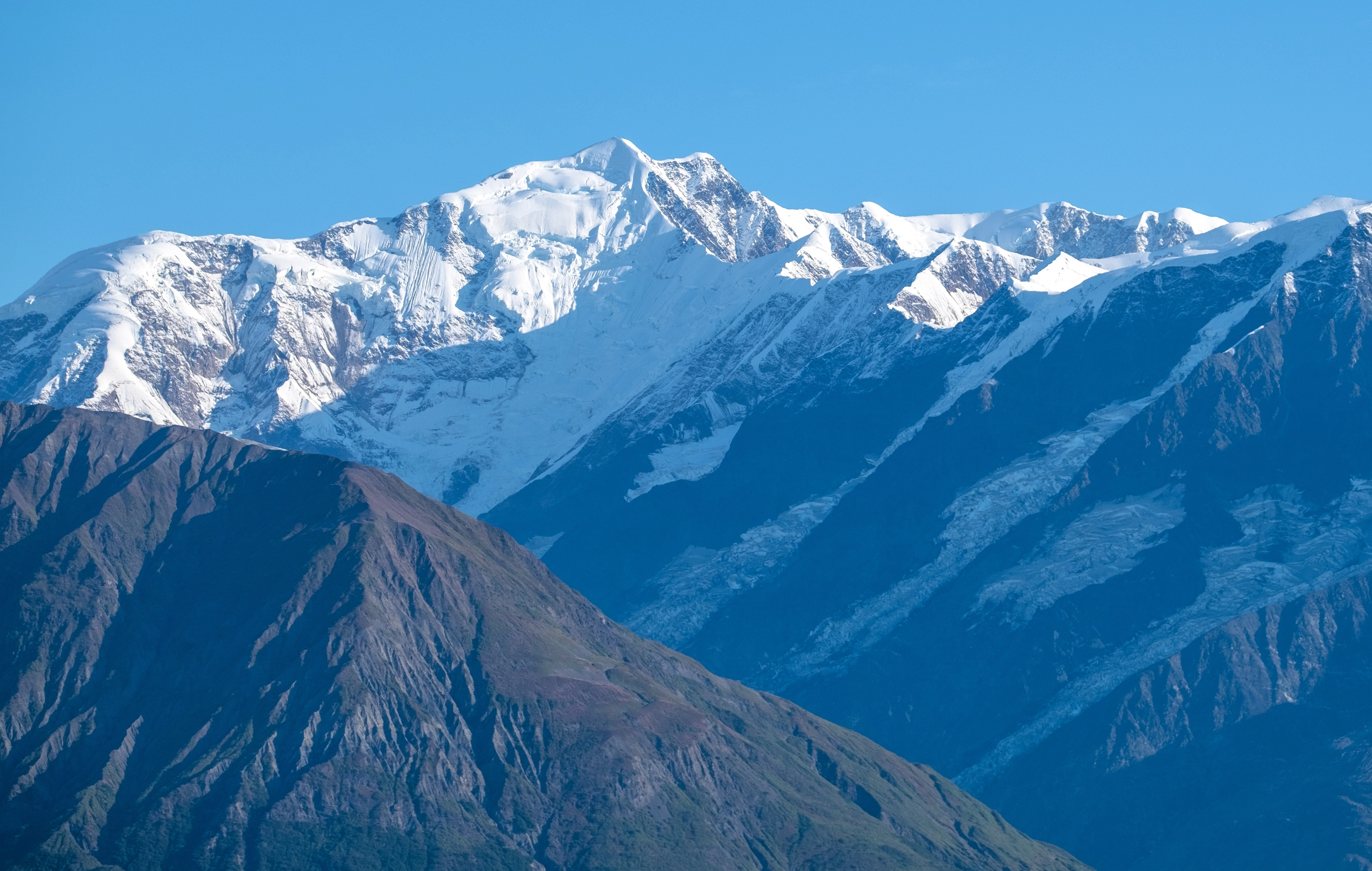
South aspect

== See also ==
- List of mountain peaks of North America
  - List of mountain peaks of the United States
    - List of mountain peaks of Alaska
