= Mount Igikpak =

Mountain in Alaska, U.S.

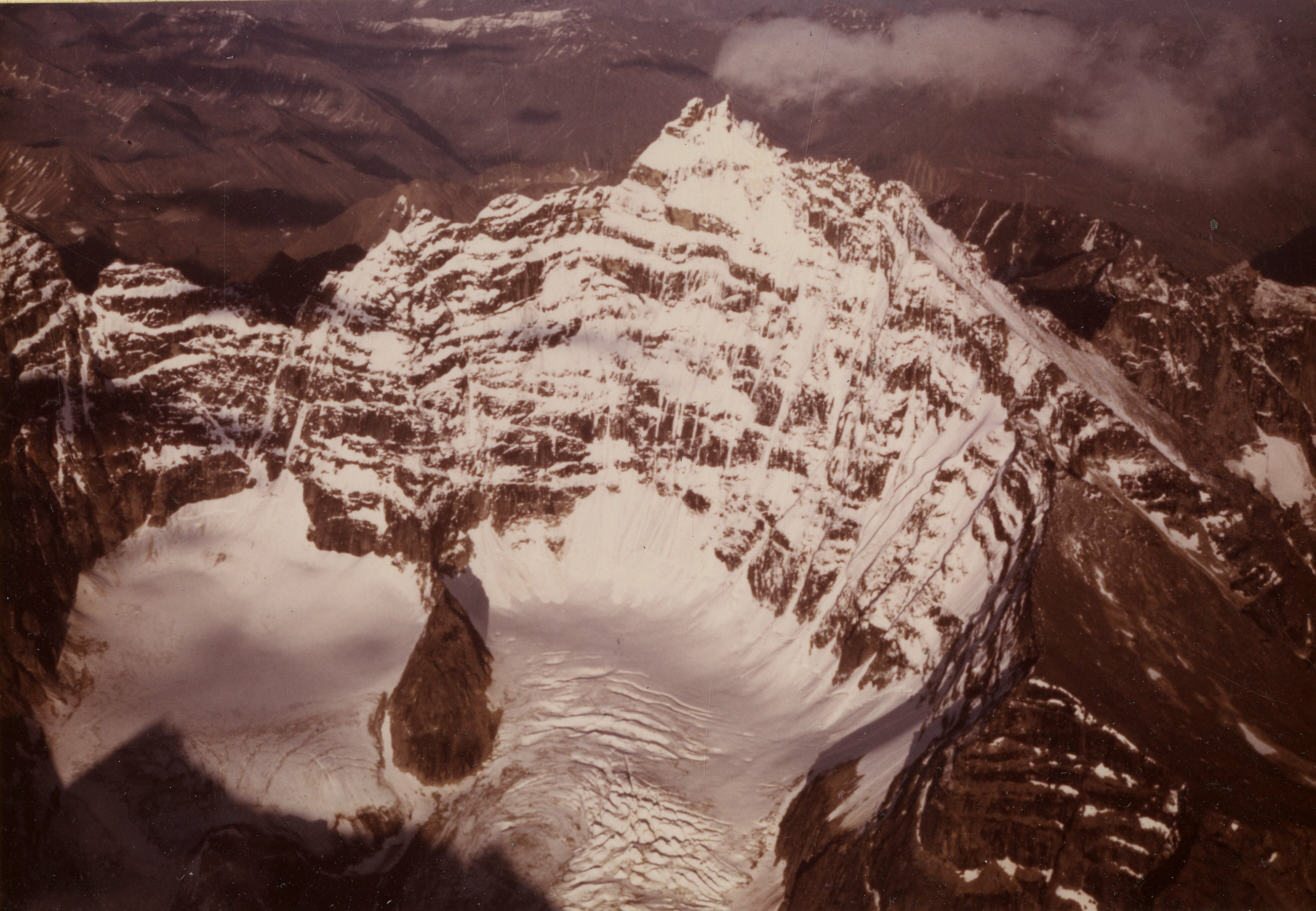
- Northwest face, 1973

Highest point
- Elevation: 8,276 ft (2,523 m)
- Prominence: 6,076 ft (1,852 m)
- Listing: North America isolated peaks 41st; US most prominent peaks 60th
- Coordinates: 67°24′47″N 154°57′59″W

Naming
- Native name: Iġġiqpak (Inupiaq)

Geography
- Location within Alaska
- Location: Northwest Arctic Borough, Alaska
- Parent range: Brooks Range
- Topo map: USGS Survey Pass B-4

Climbing
- First ascent: 1968 by David Roberts, Chuck Loucks and Al De Maria

Mount Igikpak (Iñupiaq: Iġġiqpak) is the highest peak in the Schwatka Mountains region of the Brooks Range. It is also the tallest mountain in Gates of the Arctic National Park, located in the US state of Alaska. Some sources list the height of its summit at 8,510 ft (2,590 m). Mount Igikpak is in the south central part of the national park, very close to the source of the Noatak River and not far from the Arrigetch Peaks. Its name comes from the Iñupiaq word Iġġiqpak, meaning 'big mountain'.

== Climbing History ==
The first ascent of Mount Igikpak was completed August 9, 1968 by David Roberts, Chuck Loucks, and Al De Maria.

== See also ==
- List of mountain peaks of North America
  - List of mountain peaks of the United States
    - List of mountain peaks of Alaska
- List of Ultras of the United States
