= Hanagita Peak =

Mountain in Alaska, United States

- Location within Alaska

Highest point
- Elevation: 8,462 ft (2,579 m)
- Prominence: 6,004 ft (1,830 m)
- Isolation: 21.94 mi (35.31 km)
- Coordinates: 61°04′02″N 143°42′28″W

Geography
- Location: Wrangell-St. Elias National Park and Preserve of Alaska, United States
- Parent range: Chugach Mountains

Climbing
- Easiest route: hike

Hanagita Peak is a summit in the Chugach Mountains in the Wrangell-St. Elias National Park and Preserve of Alaska, United States. The prominent is 6,004-foot (1,830 m) ranking it 67th on the list of prominent peaks in the United States.

The peak was named in 1911 and is named after Chief Hanagita of Chitina.

== See also ==
- List of mountain peaks of Alaska
  - List of the most prominent summits of Alaska
