= Double Peak (Alaska) =

Mountain in Alaska, United States

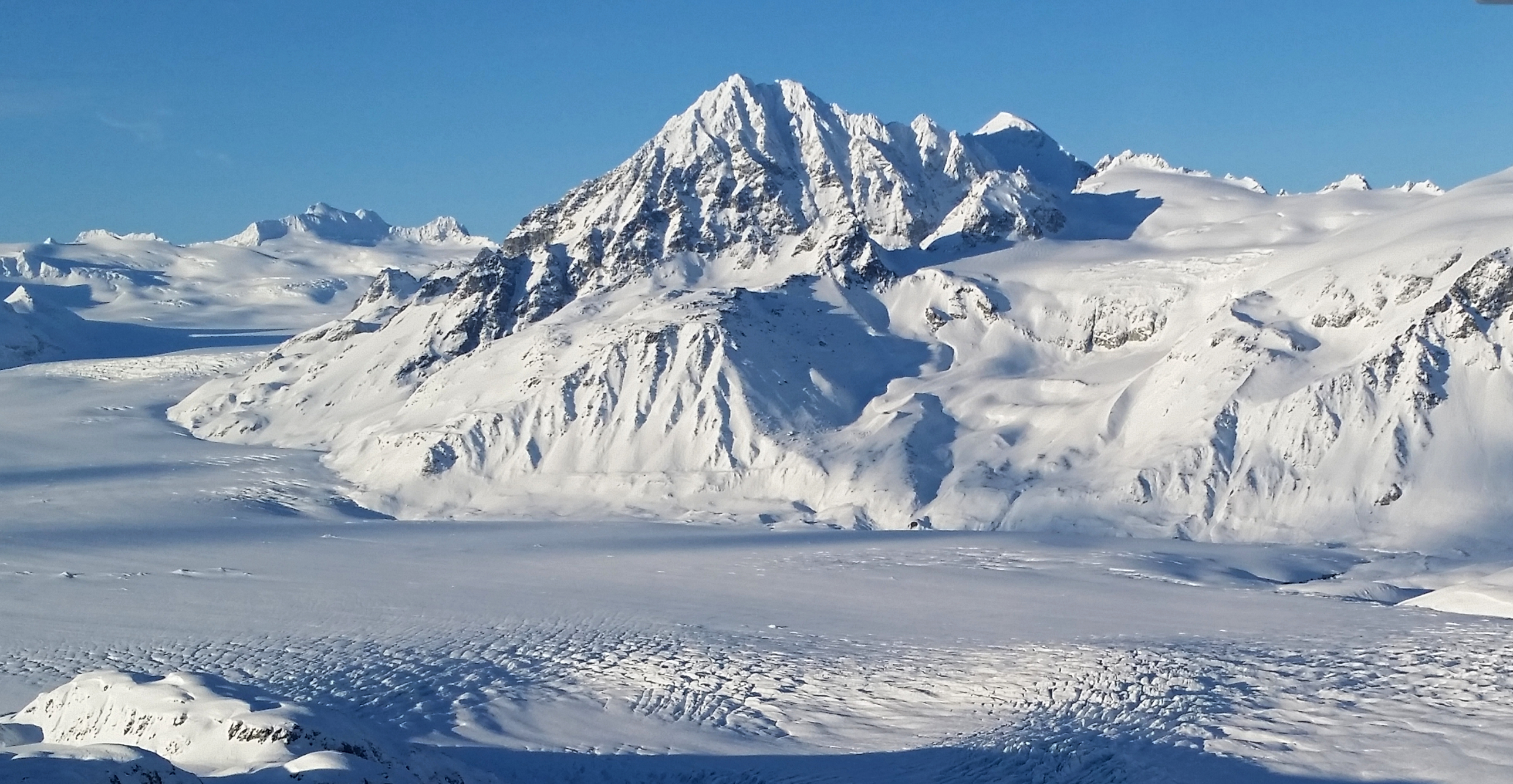
- Double Peak, southeast aspect

Highest point
- Elevation: 6,818 ft (2,078 m)
- Prominence: 4,610 ft (1,410 m)
- Parent peak: Redoubt Volcano (10,197 ft)
- Isolation: 15.8 mi (25.4 km)
- Coordinates: 60°43′47″N 152°35′10″W

Geography
- Location within Alaska
- Interactive map of Double Peak
- Location: Lake Clark National Park; Kenai Peninsula Borough; Alaska, United States
- Parent range: Chigmit Mountains; Aleutian Range
- Topo map: USGS Kenai C-7

Climbing
- First ascent: 1973

Double Peak is a prominent 6,818 foot (2,078 meter) mountain summit located in Lake Clark National Park and Preserve, in the Chigmit Mountains of the Aleutian Range, in the US state of Alaska. It is the highest non-volcanic peak in the Chigmit Mountains, and third-highest overall. The mountain is situated immediately north of Double Glacier, 100 mi (161 km) west-southwest of Anchorage, and 17.74 mi (29 km) north-northeast of Redoubt Volcano, which is the nearest higher peak. Although modest in elevation, relief is significant since the mountain rises up from tidewater at Cook Inlet in about 20 miles, and it ranks 71st in prominence for all peaks in Alaska. Double Peak was considered to be a volcano by the International Association of Volcanology and Chemistry of the Earth's Interior in 1973, but subsequent reconnaissance mapping indicates the peak is likely made of plutonic rocks of Jurassic age.

Published in 1912 by the United States Coast and Geodetic Survey, the mountain takes its name from the Double Glacier which the peak overlooks. The first ascent of the mountain was made May 19, 1973, by Steve Hackett, John Samuelson, Helmut Tschaffert, Toby Wheeler, Daniel Hurd, and Daniel Jones via the steep northwest snow face. The months May through June offer the most favorable weather for viewing or climbing the peak.

== Climate ==
Based on the Köppen climate classification, Double Peak is located in a subarctic climate zone, with long, cold, snowy winters, and cool summers. Temperatures can drop below −20 °C with wind chill factors below −30 °C. Precipitation runoff from the mountain drains into Cook Inlet via Big River.

== See also ==
- List of the most prominent summits of the United States (149th)
- List of mountain peaks of Alaska
- Geography of Alaska
