= Mount Chosin Few =

Mountain in Alaska, United States

- Peak 8084, De Long Peak
- Location within Alaska
- Interactive map of Mount Chosin Few

Highest point
- Elevation: 8,042 ft (2,451 m)
- Prominence: 6,184 ft (1,885 m)
- Isolation: 42.84 mi (68.94 km)
- Coordinates: 60°49′47″N 145°07′58″W

Geography
- Country: United States
- State: Alaska
- Protected area: Chugach National Forest
- Parent range: Chugach Mountains

Climbing
- Easiest route: hike

Mount Chosin Few is a summit in the Chugach Mountains in the Chugach National Forest of Alaska, United States. The prominence is 6,145-foot (1,873 m) ranking it 54th on the list of prominent peaks in the United States.

The peak was named in 2012 by the United States Board on Geographic Names after local and state efforts to rename the peak. The name was in recognition of those who fought at the Battle of Chosin Reservoir in 1950. Those who survived the battle are referred to as The Chosin Few.

== See also ==
- List of mountain peaks of Alaska
  - List of the most prominent summits of Alaska
