= Sovereign Mountain =

Mountain in Alaska, United States

- Location within Alaska

Highest point
- Elevation: 8,731 ft (2,661 m)
- Prominence: 5,899 ft (1,798 m)
- Isolation: 43.9 mi (70.7 km)
- Coordinates: 62°07′52″N 148°36′18″W

Geography
- Location: Matanuska-Susitna Borough of Alaska, United States
- Parent range: Talkeetna Mountains

Climbing
- Easiest route: hike

Sovereign Mountain is a summit in the Talkeetna Mountains in the Matanuska-Susitna Borough of Alaska, United States. The prominence is 5,899-foot (1,798 m) ranking it 70th on the List of the most prominent summits of the United States.

With an elevation of 8,849-foot (2,697 m) it is the highest peak in the Talkeetna Mountains.

== See also ==
- List of mountain peaks of Alaska
  - List of the most prominent summits of Alaska
