= Black Mountain (Alaska) =

Mountain in Alaska, United States

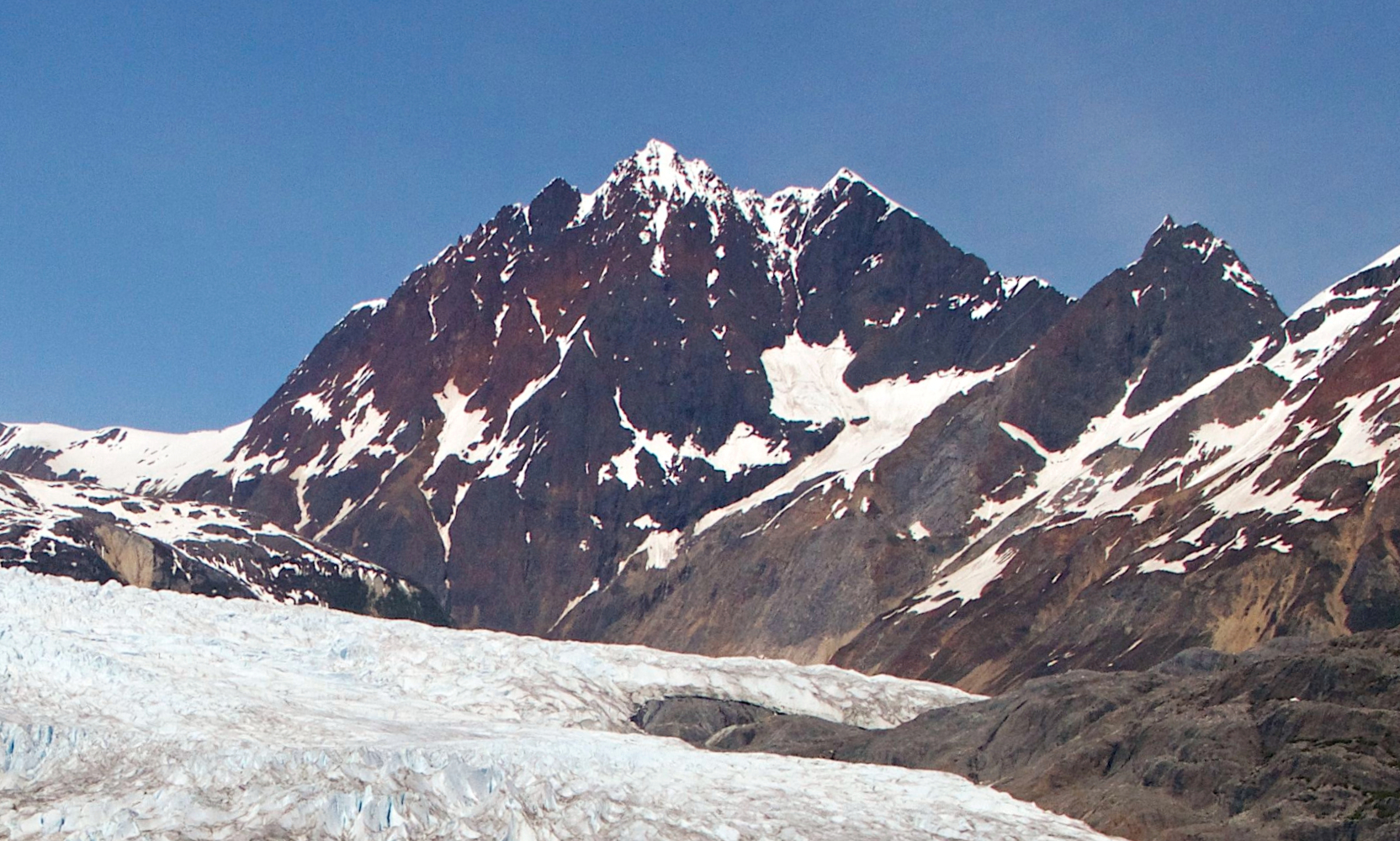
- Black Mountain, southwest aspect

Highest point
- Elevation: 5,891 ft (1,796 m)
- Prominence: 1,548 ft (472 m)
- Isolation: 4.2 mi (6.8 km)
- Coordinates: 59°06′55″N 136°07′18″W

Geography
- Location within Alaska
- Interactive map of Black Mountain
- Location: Glacier Bay National Park; Hoonah-Angoon; Alaska, United States
- Parent range: Alsek Ranges; Saint Elias Mountains
- Topo map: USGS Skagway A-3

Climbing
- Easiest route: North slope

Black Mountain is a prominent, 5,891-foot-high (1,796-meter) mountain summit located in the Alsek Ranges of the Saint Elias Mountains in southeast Alaska. The mountain is situated in Glacier Bay National Park and Preserve, 75 mi (121 km) northwest of Juneau, between the Riggs and McBride glaciers. The months May through June offer the most favorable weather for viewing or climbing Black Mountain. Weather permitting, Black Mountain can be seen from Muir Inlet of Glacier Bay, which is a popular destination for cruise ships.

== Climate ==
Based on the Köppen climate classification, Black Mountain has a subarctic climate with cold, snowy winters, and cool summers. Weather systems coming off the Gulf of Alaska are forced upwards by the Saint Elias Mountains (orographic lift), causing heavy precipitation in the form of rainfall and snowfall. Temperatures can drop below −20 °C with wind chill factors below −30 °C. This climate supports the Riggs Glacier below the west slopes, and McBride Glacier to the east.

== Gallery ==
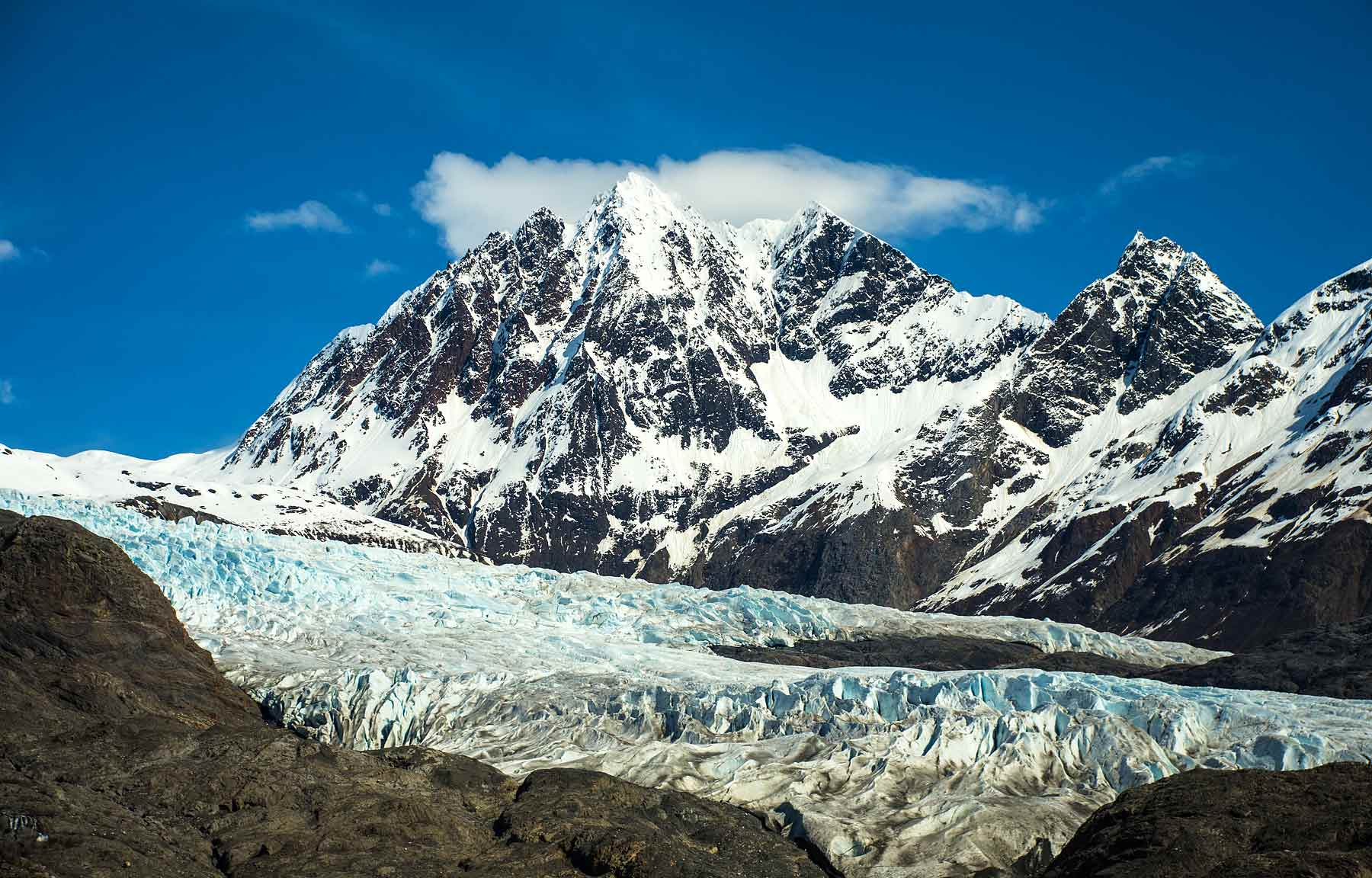
Black Mountain and Riggs Glacier

== See also ==
- List of mountain peaks of Alaska
- Geography of Alaska
