= Mount Bear =

Mountain in Alaska, United States

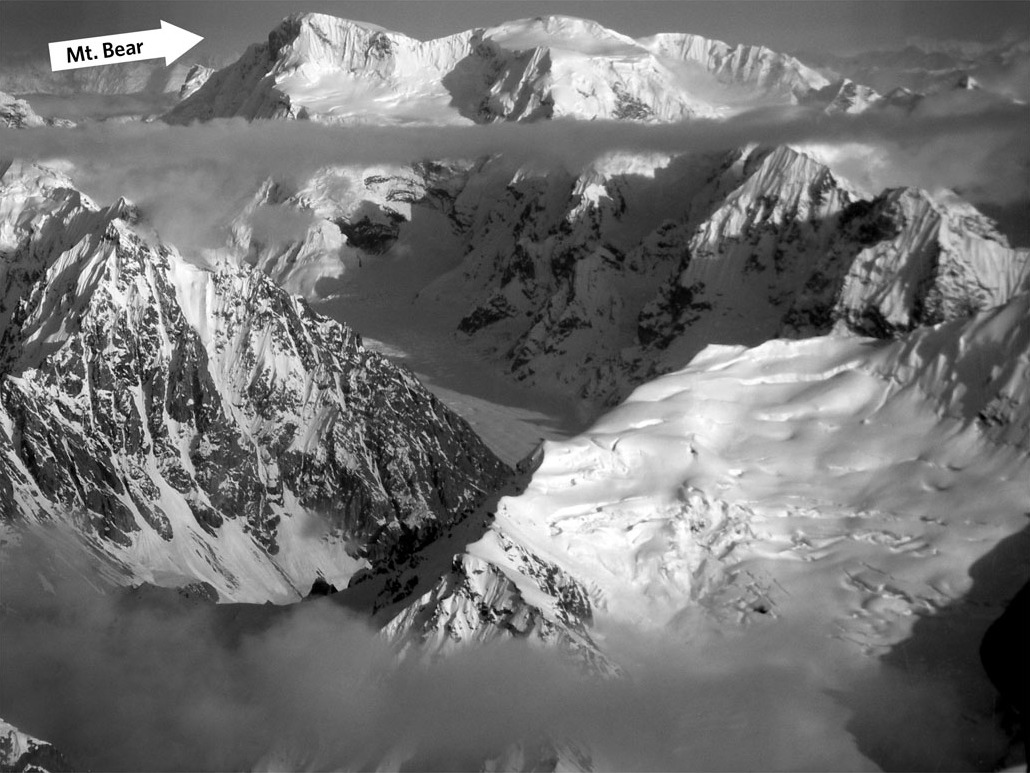

Highest point
- Elevation: 14,831 ft (4,520 m); NAVD88
- Prominence: 5054 ft (1540 m)
- Isolation: 20.1 mi (32.4 km)
- Listing: North America highest peaks 20th; US highest major peaks 9th; US most prominent peaks 124th; Alaska highest major peaks 9th
- Coordinates: 61°17′02″N 141°08′32″W

Geography
- Location within Alaska
- Location: Wrangell-St. Elias National Park and Preserve, Alaska, U.S.
- Parent range: Saint Elias Mountains
- Topo map: USGS McCarthy B-1

Mount Bear is a high, glaciated peak in the Saint Elias Mountains of Alaska. It lies within Wrangell-Saint Elias National Park, about 4 miles (6.4 km) west of the Yukon border. The Barnard Glacier flows from its southwest slopes, while the Klutlan Glacier lies to the north. Its principal claim to fame is that it is a fourteener, and in fact one of the highest 20 peaks in the United States.

Despite its height, Mount Bear is a little-visited peak, being surrounded by higher and better-known peaks such as Mount Bona on the west, and Mount Lucania and Mount Logan on the east. However it is a large peak even in relative terms: for example, the drop from the summit to the Barnard Glacier is 8,000 ft (2,440 m) in less than 5 miles (8 km), and 10,000 ft (3,050 m) in less than 12 miles (19.3 km).

== See also ==
- List of mountain peaks of North America
  - List of mountain peaks of the United States
    - List of mountain peaks of Alaska
- List of the highest major summits of the United States
- List of the most prominent summits of the United States
