= Kahiltna Dome =

Mountain in Alaska, United States

- Location within Alaska

Highest point
- Elevation: 12,411 ft (3,783 m)
- Prominence: 2,175 ft (663 m)
- Parent peak: Denali
- Coordinates: 63°03′18″N 151°14′11″W

Geography
- Location: Denali Borough, Alaska, United States
- Parent range: Alaska Range
- Topo map: USGS Mount McKinley A-3

Climbing
- Easiest route: North ridge

Kahiltna Dome is a 12,411-foot (3,783 m) mountain in the central Alaska Range, in Denali National Park, 7.3 mi (12 km) west of Denali. It is separated from Denali by a deep glacial valley occupied by Kahiltna Glacier, with Kahiltna Pass at its head. It is described as an ice-covered dome, the 56th-highest peak in Alaska.

== See also ==
- Mountain peaks of Alaska
