= Mount Neacola =

Mountain in the U.S. state of Alaska

- Location within Alaska

Highest point
- Elevation: 9,426 ft (2,873 m)
- Prominence: 6,326 ft (1,928 m)
- Listing: US most prominent peaks 48th
- Coordinates: 60°47′55″N 153°23′38″W

Geography
- Location: Lake Clark National Park and Preserve, Alaska, U.S.
- Parent range: Neacola Mountains (Aleutian Range)

Climbing
- First ascent: May 20, 1991 by James Garrett, Loren Glick, Kennan Harvey
- Easiest route: West Face: snow/ice climb

Mount Neacola (or Neacola Peak) is the unofficial name for the high point of the Neacola Mountains, the northernmost section of the Aleutian Range of Alaska, United States. Despite its low elevation compared to many of the major Alaskan peaks, Mount Neacola is an impressive peak, due to its steep, pointed shape and its low base.

Mount Neacola was first climbed in 1991 by James Garrett, Loren Glick, and Kennan Harvey, on an expedition inspired by Fred Beckey. They climbed a notable couloir on the West Face to the North Ridge, and thence to the summit. The route involves 4,600 feet (1,400 m) of ascent, mostly on ice up to an angle of 65 degrees. New Hampshire climbers Ryan Driscoll, Justin Guarino, and Nick Aiello-Popeo have reported the first complete ascent of the north face in April 2021.

== See also ==
- List of mountain peaks of North America
  - List of mountain peaks of the United States
    - List of mountain peaks of Alaska
- List of Ultras of the United States

== Sources ==
- American Alpine Journal, 1992.
- Michael Wood and Colby Coombs, Alaska: a climbing guide, The Mountaineers, 2001.
- Alaska Ultra-Prominence List
- American Alpine Journal, 2021.(podcast)
