= Isthmus Peak =

Summit in Alaska, United States

- Location within Alaska

Highest point
- Elevation: 6,532 ft (1,991 m)
- Prominence: 5,810 ft (1,770 m)
- Isolation: 32.33 mi (52.03 km)
- Coordinates: 60°34′38″N 148°53′29″W

Geography
- Location: Chugach National Forest of Alaska, United States
- Parent range: Kenai Mountains

Climbing
- Easiest route: hike

Isthmus Peak is the unofficial name of a 6,532-foot (1,991 m) summit in the Kenai Mountains on the Kenai Peninsula in Alaska, United States. The prominent is 5,810-foot (1,771 m) ranking it 76th on the list of prominent peaks in the United States.

== See also ==
- List of mountain peaks of Alaska
  - List of the most prominent summits of Alaska
