= Mount Moffett =

Mountain in Alaska, United States

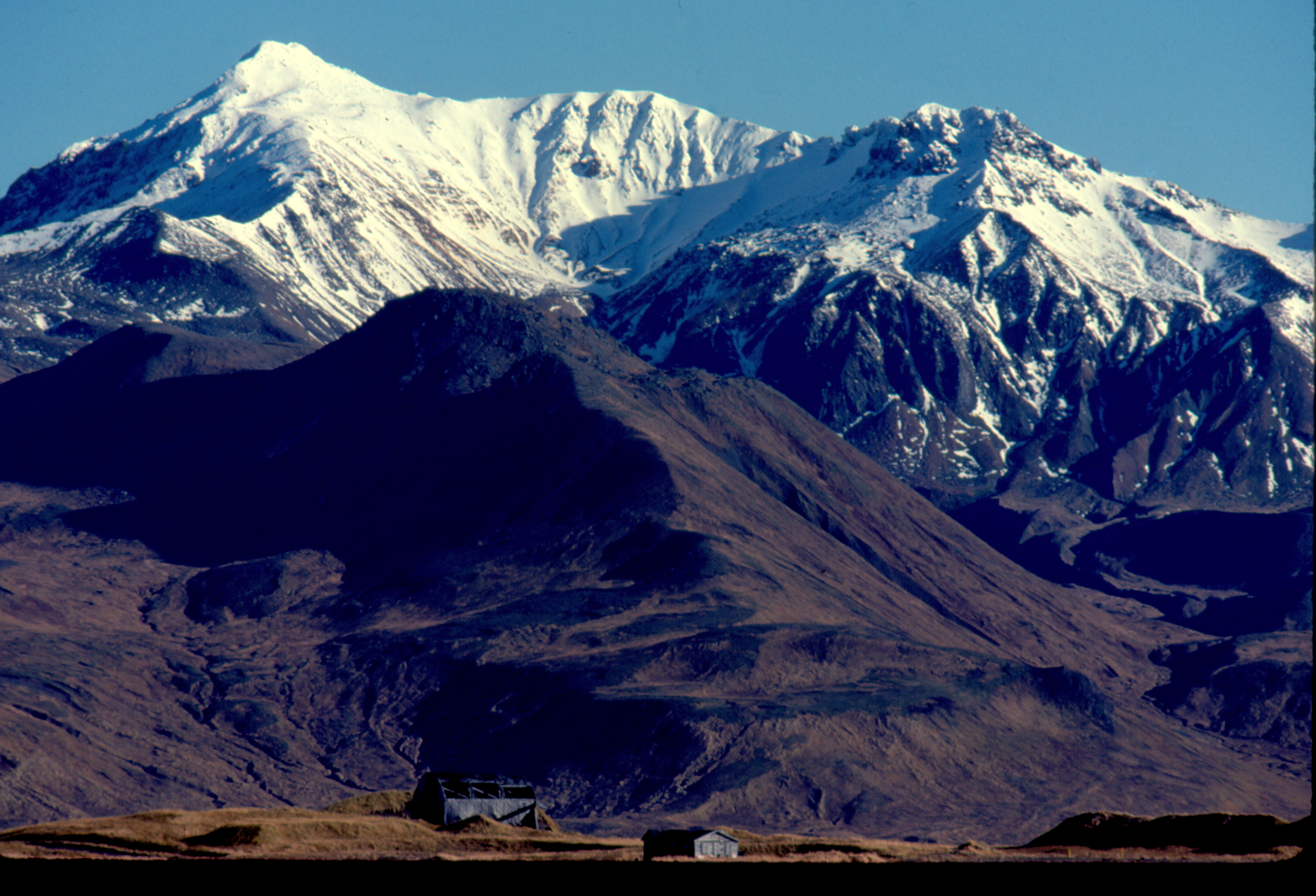
- Mount Moffett in 1990.

Highest point
- Elevation: 3,924 ft (1,196 m)
- Prominence: 1,196 m (3,924 ft)
- Coordinates: 51°56′11″N 176°44′34″W

Geography
- Location within Alaska
- Location: Adak Island, Alaska, United States
- Parent range: Aleutian Range
- Topo map: USGS Adak C-3

Geology
- Mountain type: Stratovolcano
- Last eruption: 1600 BCE (?)

Mount Moffett is a mountainous stratovolcano that forms the summit of Adak Island of the Aleutian Islands in the U.S. state of Alaska. Its peak reaches 3,924 feet (1,196 m). It is heavily glaciated and is made primarily of high alumina basalt and andesite. It has never had an eruption in recorded history. The southern flank of the mountain is assumed to be its youngest side. In comparison to other Aleutian stratovolcanoes, Moffett is a small vent, characteristic of its mixed composition.

It was named by the U.S. Navy in 1936 for Rear Admiral William Adger Moffett.

It has occasionally been skied with there once being a ski-lift on the lower portion.
