= Neacola Mountains =

Mountain range in Alaska

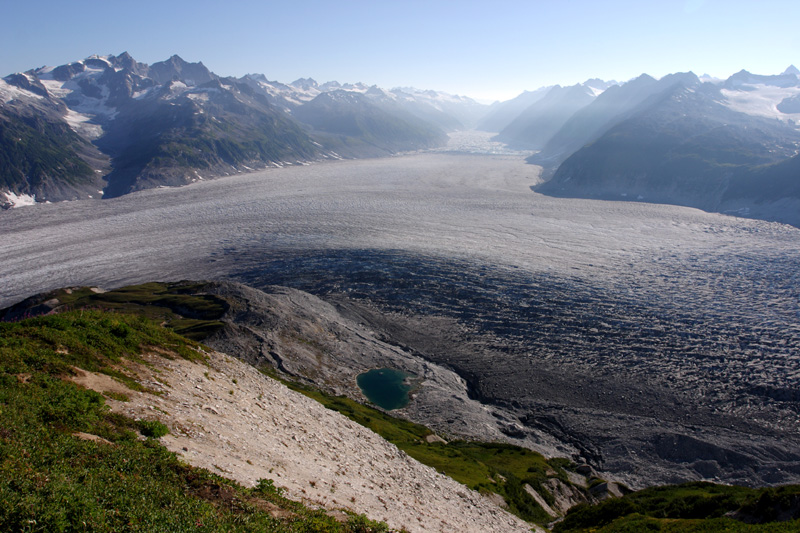
- Blockade Glacier in the Neacola Mountains

Highest point
- Peak: Mount Neacola
- Elevation: 9,426 ft (2,873 m)
- Coordinates: 60°47′55″N 153°23′38″W

Dimensions
- Length: 88 mi (142 km) North-South
- Width: 157 mi (253 km) East-West

Naming
- Etymology: Named for the Neacola River

Geography
- Location within Alaska
- Country: United States
- State: Alaska
- Range coordinates: 60°37′N 154°05′W
- Parent range: Aleutian Range
- Borders on: Chigmit Mountains, Tordrillo Mountains and Alaska Range

The Neacola Mountains are the northernmost subrange of the Aleutian Range in the U.S. state of Alaska. The range is named for the Neacola River which bounds it to the north and drains the highest and most rugged peaks of the group. They are bordered on the southeast by the Chigmit Mountains, another subrange of the Aleutian Range, on the northeast by the Tordrillo Mountains, and on the west and southwest by the lakes and lowlands of Lake Clark National Park and Preserve. The highest peak is Mount Neacola (also known as "Neacola Peak"), 9,426 feet (2,873 m) although the name is not officially recognized.

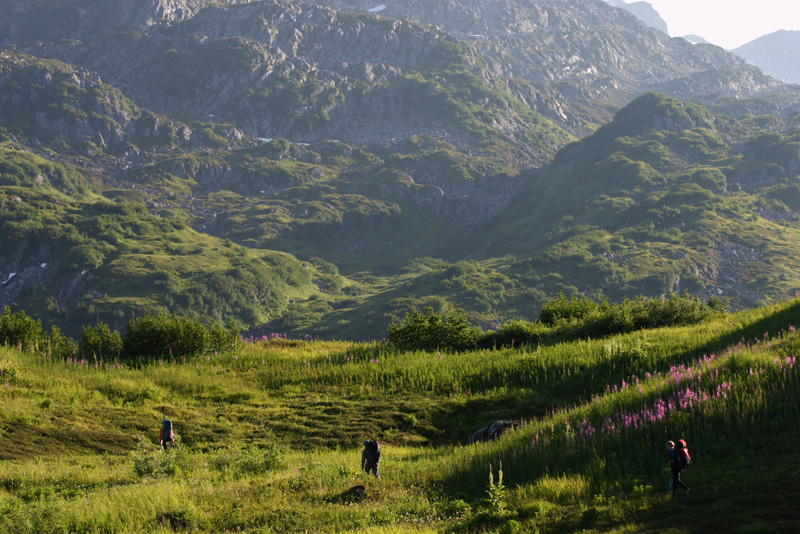
Meadow in the Neacola Mountains

These mountains have not seen extensive exploration, due to their remoteness, typically poor weather, and lack of truly high peaks. However they are rugged and offer many climbing possibilities of an exploratory nature. Noted climber Fred Beckey visited the range in the early 1970s; in 1991, when he was "spiritual leader" of the expedition which made the first ascent of Mount Neacola; and again in 2004. Other recorded climbing visits occurred in 1979 and 1995.

== Sources ==
- American Alpine Journal, 1980, 1992, 1996, 2005.
- Wood, Michael; Coombs, Colby (2001). Alaska: a climbing guide. The Mountaineers.
