= Tressider Peak =

Mountain in Alaska, 13315 feet high United States of America

- Location within Alaska Location within North America

Highest point
- Elevation: 13,315 ft (4,060 m)
- Prominence: 1,615 ft (490 m)
- Coordinates: 61°21′32″N 141°39′59″W

Geography
- Location: Copper River Census Area, Alaska U.S.
- Parent range: Saint Elias Range
- Topo map: USGS McCarthy

Tressider Peak (13,315 ft; 4,060 m) is in Wrangell-St. Elias National Park and Preserve in the U.S. state of Alaska. The peak is less than 2 mi (3.2 km) southeast of Mount Bona.
