= Pyre Peak =

Volcano in Alaska, United States

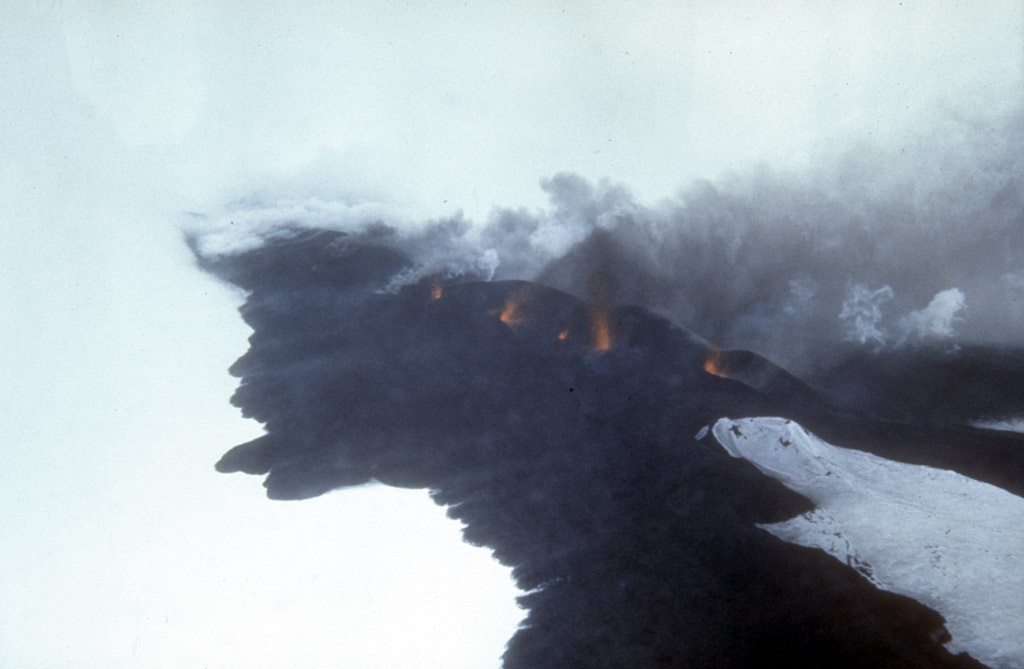
- Incandescent lava fountaining from a fissure eruption near Pyre Peak

Highest point
- Elevation: 3,458 ft (1,054 m)
- Prominence: 3,458 ft (1,054 m)
- Isolation: 60.68 mi (97.65 km)
- Coordinates: 52°18′54″N 172°30′37″W

Geography
- Location within Alaska
- Location: Seguam Island, Alaska, U.S.
- Parent range: Aleutian Range
- Topo map: USGS Seguam D-2

Geology
- Formed by: Subduction zone volcanism
- Mountain type: Stratovolcano
- Volcanic arc: Aleutian Arc
- Last eruption: 1993

Pyre Peak, also called Seguam Volcano, is an active stratovolcano on Seguam Island in the Aleutian Islands of Alaska.

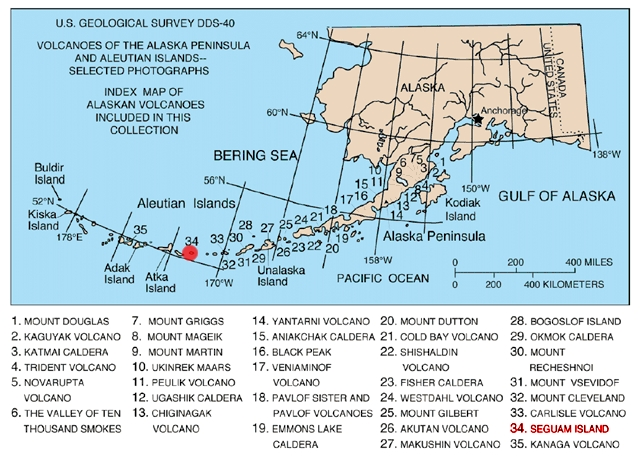
Map showing volcanoes of Alaska. The mark is set at the location of Pyre Peak.

== Sources ==
- "Seguam". Global Volcanism Program. Smithsonian Institution.
- Volcanoes of the Alaska Peninsula and Aleutian Islands-Selected Photographs
- Alaska Volcano Observatory
