= Snow Tower =

Mountain in Alaska

- Location within Alaska

Highest point
- Elevation: 6,572 ft (2,003 m)
- Prominence: 6,122 ft (1,866 m)
- Isolation: 10.15 mi (16.33 km)
- Coordinates: 58°10′24″N 133°24′00″W

Geography
- Location: Juneau; Alaska, United States
- Parent range: Coast Mountains

Snow Tower is a mountain summit located in the state capital Juneau, in the U.S. state of Alaska. It is part of the Coast Mountains.
