= Truuli Peak =

Mountain on Kenai Peninsula, Alaska, United States

- Location within Alaska

Highest point
- Elevation: 6,612 ft (2,015 m)
- Prominence: 6,062 ft (1,848 m)
- Isolation: 87.72 mi (141.17 km)
- Coordinates: 59°54′48″N 150°26′01″W

Geography
- Location: Kenai Peninsula Borough; Alaska, United States
- Parent range: Kenai Mountains

Truuli Peak is a mountain summit located in the Kenai Mountains, in the U.S. state of Alaska. At 6,612 ft (2,015 m), Truuli Peak is the highest mountain in the Kenai Mountains on the Kenai Peninsula in southern Alaska. It is located in the Kenai National Wildlife Refuge in the southwest of the Harding Icefield between the Chernof and Truuli glaciers.

The closest higher peak is Mount Redoubt, 143 km (89 mi) away in the Chigmit Mountains west of the Cook Inlet.

The first ascent of the Truuli Peaks took place in 1968 under the direction of Vinn Hoeman as part of the first recorded crossing of the Harding Icefield, which led from Kachemak Bay to the Exit Glacier. The name "Truuli" was given by Hoeman and comes from the Indian name for the Kenai Mountains.
