= List of mountain peaks of Greenland =

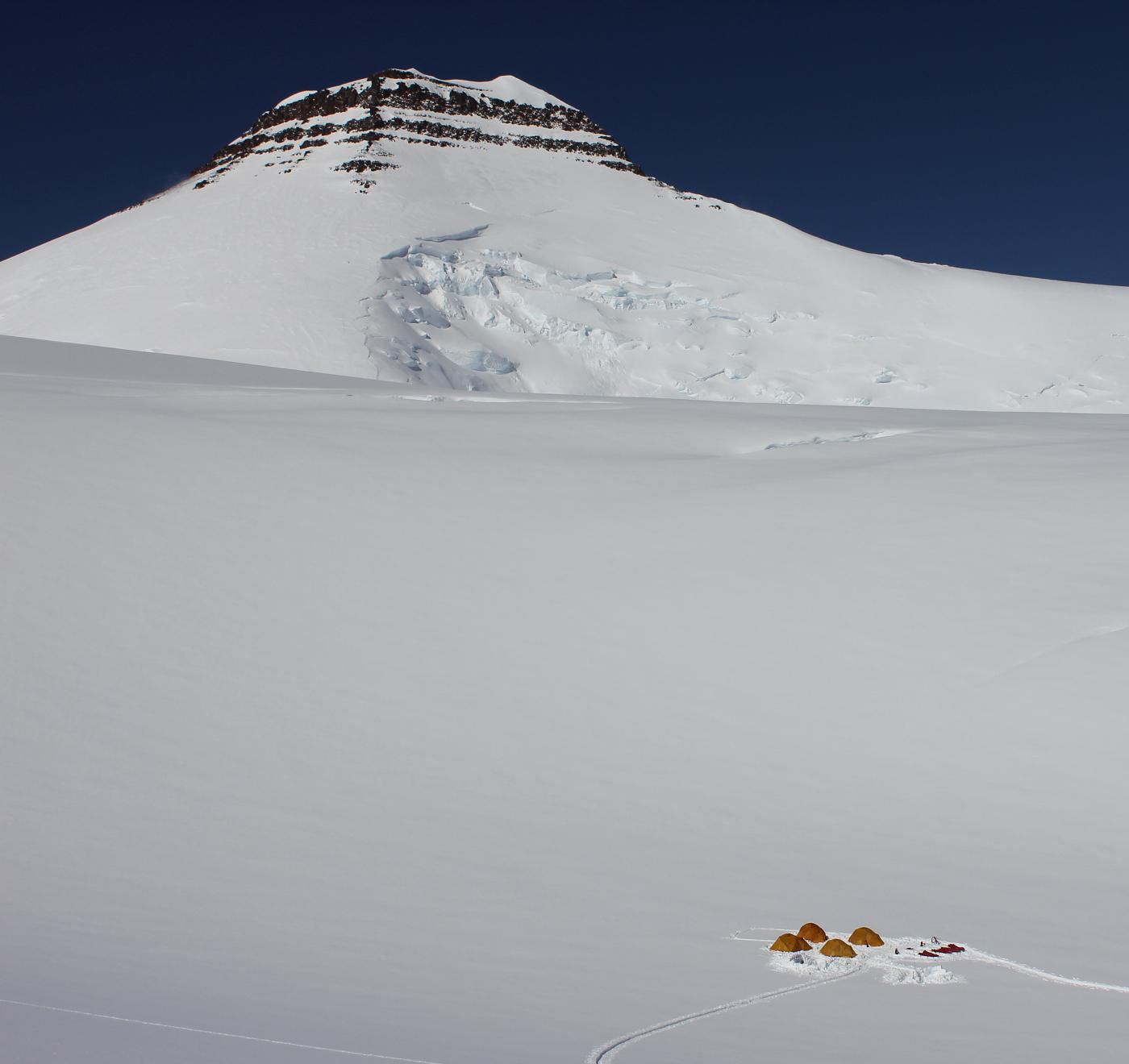
The summit of Gunnbjørn Fjeld is the highest point on the Island of Greenland, Kalaallit Nunaat, the Kingdom of Denmark, and the entire Arctic.

This article comprises three sortable tables of major mountain peaks of the nation of Greenland (Kalaallit Nunaat). Kalaallit Nunaat includes the Island of Greenland and surrounding islands.

The summit of a mountain or hill may be measured in three principal ways:

1. The topographic elevation of a summit measures the height of the summit above a geodetic sea level. The first table below ranks the 40 highest major summits of Greenland by elevation.
2. The topographic prominence of a summit is a measure of how high the summit rises above its surroundings. The second table below ranks the 40 most prominent summits of Greenland.
3. The topographic isolation (or radius of dominance) of a summit measures how far the summit lies from its nearest point of equal elevation. The third table below ranks the 40 most isolated major summits of Greenland.

== Highest major summits ==
Of the highest major summits of Greenland, four peaks exceed 3000 meters (9843 feet) elevation and 24 peaks equal or exceed 2000 meters (6562 feet) elevation. 29, or about three-quarters, of these peaks are on Greenland's main island, while 11 peaks are on smaller islands off the main island's coast.

The 40 highest summits of Greenland with at least 500 meters of topographic prominence
Rank	Mountain peak	Island	Elevation	Prominence	Isolation	Location
1	Gunnbjørn Fjeld (Note: The summit of Gunnbjørn Fjeld is the highest point of the Island of Greenland, Kalaallit Nunaat, the Kingdom of Denmark, and the entire Arctic.) (Note: Gunnbjørn Fjeld is the easternmost summit of its elevation in greater North America.)	Island of Greenland	3694 m 12,119 ft	3694 m 12,119 ft	3,254 km 2,022 mi	68.9184°N 29.8991°W
2	Mont Forel (Note: Mont Forel is the southernmost and westernmost summit of its elevation in Greenland.)	Island of Greenland	3391 m 11,125 ft	1581 m 5,187 ft	357 km 222 mi	66.9354°N 36.7873°W
3	Ejnar Mikkelsen Fjeld (Note: Ejnar Mikkelsen Fjeld is the easternmost 3000-meter (9843-foot) summit of Greenland and greater North America.)	Island of Greenland	3325 m 10,909 ft	1625 m 5,331 ft	16.29 km 10.12 mi	68.8957°N 28.6279°W
4	Greenland Ice Sheet high point (Note: The apex of the Greenland Ice Sheet is the northernmost 3000-meter (9843-foot) summit of Greenland and greater North America.)	Island of Greenland	3238 m 10,623 ft	500 m 1,640 ft	476 km 296 mi	72.4667°N 37.1000°W
5	Petermann Bjerg (Note: Petermann Bjerg is the northernmost and easternmost summit of its elevation of Greenland and greater North America.)	Island of Greenland	2933 m 9,623 ft	1200 m 3,937 ft	288 km 179.1 mi	73.0905°N 28.6187°W
6	Dansketinden (Note: Dansketinden is the highest peak of the Stauning Alps and the easternmost summit of its elevation of Greenland and greater North America.)	Island of Greenland	2842 m 9,324 ft	2257 m 7,405 ft	164.9 km 102.5 mi	72.1262°N 24.9512°W
7	Patuersoq (Note: Patuersoq is the southernmost and westernmost summit of its elevation in Greenland.)	Island of Greenland	2740 m 8,990 ft	500 m 1,640 ft	291 km 181.1 mi	60.8333°N 44.2333°W
8	Avannaarsua high point (Note: The apex of Avannaarsua is the northernmost and westernmost summit of its elevation in Greenland.)	Island of Greenland	2600 m 8,530 ft	500 m 1,640 ft	636 km 395 mi	77.5000°N 47.6167°W
9	Sukkertoppen (Note: Sukkertoppen is the westernmost summit of its elevation in Greenland.)	Island of Greenland	2440 m 8,005 ft	500 m 1,640 ft	401 km 249 mi	66.2000°N 52.3500°W
10	Klosterbjerge	Island of Greenland	2410 m 7,907 ft	1635 m 5,364 ft	38.8 km 24.1 mi	72.2500°N 25.9500°W
11	Margaretatopp	Island of Greenland	2360 m 7,743 ft	1585 m 5,200 ft	69 km 42.9 mi	73.3667°N 26.3000°W
12	Reval Toppen	Queen Louise Land	2320 m 7,612 ft	500 m 1,640 ft	368 km 229 mi	76.6606°N 25.7067°W
12	Payers Tinde	Island of Greenland	2320 m 7,612 ft	2045 m 6,709 ft	26.1 km 16.24 mi	73.1333°N 26.3667°W
14	Perserajoq	Island of Greenland	2259 m 7,411 ft	2009 m 6,591 ft	527 km 328 mi	71.4000°N 51.9667°W
15	Renland high point	Island of Greenland	2200 m 7,218 ft	1950 m 6,398 ft	100.8 km 62.6 mi	71.3333°N 26.3333°W
16	Kloftbjerge	Island of Greenland	2163 m 7,096 ft	1613 m 5,292 ft	92.3 km 57.4 mi	71.3333°N 25.7500°W
17	Nuussuaq high point (Note: The apex of the Nuussuaq Peninsula is the westernmost 2000-meter (6562-foot) summit in Greenland.)	Island of Greenland	2144 m 7,034 ft	1669 m 5,476 ft	86.6 km 53.8 mi	70.6966°N 52.9728°W
18	Agssaussat	Island of Greenland	2140 m 7,021 ft	1615 m 5,299 ft	18.06 km 11.22 mi	65.8833°N 52.1167°W
19	Palup Qaqa high point	Island of Upernivik	2105 m 6,906 ft	2105 m 6,906 ft	31.2 km 19.4 mi	71.3333°N 52.8167°W
20	Gaaseland high point	Island of Greenland	2100 m 6,890 ft	1550 m 5,085 ft	135.6 km 84.3 mi	70.2000°N 27.6667°W
21	Milne Land high point	Island of Milne Land	2050 m 6,726 ft	2050 m 6,726 ft	58.1 km 36.1 mi	70.8194°N 26.5956°W
22	Paatuut	Island of Greenland	2010 m 6,594 ft	1585 m 5,200 ft	45.8 km 28.4 mi	70.2966°N 52.7017°W
23	Favres Bjerg (Note: Favres Bjerg is the easternmost 2000-meter (6562-foot) summit of Greenland and greater North America.)	Island of Greenland	2000 m 6,562 ft	1546 m 5,072 ft	117.1 km 72.8 mi	73.9500°N 23.2000°W
23	Johnstrup Bjerge	Island of Greenland	2000 m 6,562 ft	1540 m 5,052 ft	30.9 km 19.21 mi	73.0000°N 25.5333°W
25	Peary Land high point (Note: The apex of Peary Land is the northernmost summit of its elevation of Greenland and greater North America.)	Island of Greenland	1910 m 6,266 ft	500 m 1,640 ft	509 km 317 mi	83.3167°N 35.3333°W
26	Pyramiden (Note: The summit of Pyramiden is the highest point of Disko Island.) (Note: Pyramiden is the westernmost summit of its elevation in the Greenland.)	Disko Island	1904 m 6,247 ft	1904 m 6,247 ft	32.7 km 20.3 mi	70.1195°N 53.3890°W
27	Angelin Bjerg (Note: The summit of Angelin Bjerg is the highest point of Ymer Island.)	Ymer Island	1900 m 6,234 ft	1900 m 6,234 ft	43.7 km 27.1 mi	73.1667°N 24.3167°W
28	Traill Island high point	Traill Island	1884 m 6,181 ft	1884 m 6,181 ft	50.8 km 31.6 mi	72.7167°N 24.0667°W
29	Parnaqussuit Qavaat high point	Island of Greenland	1860 m 6,102 ft	1820 m 5,971 ft	36.9 km 23 mi	66.4333°N 52.9167°W
30	Berzelius Bjerg	Island of Greenland	1810 m 5,938 ft	1535 m 5,036 ft	38.5 km 23.9 mi	72.4667°N 25.0667°W
31	Qingagssat Qaqit (Note: Qingagssat Qaqit is the southernmost summit of its elevation in Greenland.)	Island of Greenland	1782 m 5,846 ft	1632 m 5,354 ft	23.3 km 14.47 mi	60.5654°N 44.6949°W
32	Storo high point	Island of Storo	1770 m 5,807 ft	1770 m 5,807 ft	32.6 km 20.3 mi	70.8333°N 27.4833°W
33	Snehaetten (Note: The summit of Snehaetten is the highest point of the Qeqertaq Island.)	Qeqertaq Island	1765 m 5,791 ft	1765 m 5,791 ft	34.4 km 21.4 mi	71.6542°N 53.1641°W
34	Agdleruussakasit (Note: Agdleruussakasit is the southernmost summit of its elevation in Greenland.)	Island of Greenland	1763 m 5,784 ft	1585 m 5,200 ft	5.75 km 3.57 mi	60.1364°N 44.5293°W
35	Hahn Land high point (Note: The apex of Hahn Land is the easternmost ultra-prominent summit of Greenland and greater North America.)	Island of Greenland	1744 m 5,722 ft	1694 m 5,558 ft	347 km 216 mi	80.4333°N 19.8333°W
36	Point 1740	Island of Greenland	1740 m 5,709 ft	500 m 1,640 ft	263 km 163.4 mi	63.6667°N 50.2167°W
37	Azimuthbjerg (Note: The summit of Azimuthbjerg is the highest point of the island of Skjoldungen.)	Island of Skjoldungen	1738 m 5,702 ft	1738 m 5,702 ft	140.5 km 87.3 mi	63.4552°N 41.8508°W
38	Svedenborg Bjerg (Note: The summit of Svedenborg Bjerg is the highest point of Geographical Society Island.)	Geographical Society Island	1730 m 5,676 ft	1730 m 5,676 ft	24.9 km 15.48 mi	72.9436°N 24.3412°W
39	Appaalik (Note: The summit of Appaalik is the highest point of Appat Island.)	Appat Island	1711 m 5,614 ft	1711 m 5,614 ft	45.6 km 28.3 mi	70.9474°N 51.9918°W
40	Hardersbjerg	Island of Greenland	1679 m 5,509 ft	1658 m 5,440 ft	56.2 km 34.9 mi	73.4333°N 22.8333°W

== Most prominent summits ==
Of the most prominent summits of Greenland, only Gunnbjørn Fjeld exceeds 3000 meters (9843 feet) of topographic prominence. Six peaks exceed 2000 meters (6562 feet) and 38 peaks are ultra-prominent summits with at least 1500 meters (4921 feet) of topographic prominence.

The 40 most topographically prominent summits of Greenland
Rank	Mountain peak	Island	Elevation	Prominence	Isolation	Location
1	Gunnbjørn Fjeld	Island of Greenland	3694 m 12,119 ft	3694 m 12,119 ft	3,254.13	68.9184°N 29.8991°W
2	Dansketinden	Island of Greenland	2842 m 9,324 ft	2257 m 7,405 ft	164.9 km 102.5 mi	72.1262°N 24.9512°W
3	Palup Qaqa high point	Island of Palup Qaqa	2105 m 6,906 ft	2105 m 6,906 ft	31.2 km 19.4 mi	71.3333°N 52.8167°W
4	Milne Land high point	Island of Milne Land	2050 m 6,726 ft	2050 m 6,726 ft	58.1 km 36.1 mi	70.8194°N 26.5956°W
5	Payers Tinde	Island of Greenland	2320 m 7,612 ft	2045 m 6,709 ft	26.1 km 16.24 mi	73.1333°N 26.3667°W
6	Perserajoq	Island of Greenland	2259 m 7,411 ft	2009 m 6,591 ft	527 km 328 mi	71.4000°N 51.9667°W
7	Renland high point	Island of Greenland	2200 m 7,218 ft	1950 m 6,398 ft	100.8 km 62.6 mi	71.3333°N 26.3333°W
8	Pyramiden	Disko Island	1904 m 6,247 ft	1904 m 6,247 ft	32.7 km 20.3 mi	70.1195°N 53.3890°W
9	Angelin Bjerg	Ymer Island	1900 m 6,234 ft	1900 m 6,234 ft	43.7 km 27.1 mi	73.1667°N 24.3167°W
10	Traill Island high point	Traill Island	1884 m 6,181 ft	1884 m 6,181 ft	50.8 km 31.6 mi	72.7167°N 24.0667°W
11	Parnaqussuit Qavaat high point	Island of Greenland	1860 m 6,102 ft	1820 m 5,971 ft	36.9 km 23 mi	66.4333°N 52.9167°W
12	Storo high point	Island of Storo	1770 m 5,807 ft	1770 m 5,807 ft	32.6 km 20.3 mi	70.8333°N 27.4833°W
13	Snehaetten	Qeqertaq Island	1765 m 5,791 ft	1765 m 5,791 ft	34.4 km 21.4 mi	71.6542°N 53.1641°W
14	Azimuthbjerg	Island of Skjoldungen	1738 m 5,702 ft	1738 m 5,702 ft	140.5 km 87.3 mi	63.4552°N 41.8508°W
15	Svedenborg Bjerg	Geographical Society Island	1730 m 5,676 ft	1730 m 5,676 ft	24.9 km 15.48 mi	72.9436°N 24.3412°W
16	Appaalik	Agpat Island	1711 m 5,614 ft	1711 m 5,614 ft	45.6 km 28.3 mi	70.9474°N 51.9918°W
17	Hahn Land high point	Island of Greenland	1744 m 5,722 ft	1694 m 5,558 ft	347 km 216 mi	80.4333°N 19.8333°W
18	Nuussuaq high point	Island of Greenland	2144 m 7,034 ft	1669 m 5,476 ft	86.6 km 53.8 mi	70.6966°N 52.9728°W
19	Hardersbjerg	Island of Greenland	1679 m 5,509 ft	1658 m 5,440 ft	56.2 km 34.9 mi	73.4333°N 22.8333°W
20	Klosterbjerge	Island of Greenland	2410 m 7,907 ft	1635 m 5,364 ft	38.8 km 24.1 mi	72.2500°N 25.9500°W
21	Qingagssat Qaqit	Island of Greenland	1782 m 5,846 ft	1632 m 5,354 ft	23.3 km 14.47 mi	60.5654°N 44.6949°W
22	Ejnar Mikkelsen Fjeld	Island of Greenland	3325 m 10,909 ft	1625 m 5,331 ft	16.29 km 10.12 mi	68.8957°N 28.6279°W
23	Agssaussat	Island of Greenland	2140 m 7,021 ft	1615 m 5,299 ft	18.06 km 11.22 mi	65.8833°N 52.1167°W
24	Kloftbjerge	Island of Greenland	2163 m 7,096 ft	1613 m 5,292 ft	92.3 km 57.4 mi	71.3333°N 25.7500°W
25	Salliaruseq high point	Salliaruseq Island	1610 m 5,282 ft	1610 m 5,282 ft	29.5 km 18.32 mi	64.3913°N 51.1134°W
26	Clavering Island high point	Clavering Island	1604 m 5,262 ft	1604 m 5,262 ft	77.1 km 47.9 mi	74.3667°N 21.1833°W
27	Schweizerland high point	Island of Greenland	1671 m 5,482 ft	1596 m 5,236 ft	95.4 km 59.3 mi	66.1203°N 37.4420°W
28	Margaretatopp	Island of Greenland	2360 m 7,743 ft	1585 m 5,200 ft	69 km 42.9 mi	73.3667°N 26.3000°W
28	Paatuut	Island of Greenland	2010 m 6,594 ft	1585 m 5,200 ft	45.8 km 28.4 mi	70.2966°N 52.7017°W
28	Agdleruussakasit	Island of Greenland	1763 m 5,784 ft	1585 m 5,200 ft	5.75 km 3.57 mi	60.1364°N 44.5293°W
31	Mont Forel	Island of Greenland	3391 m 11,125 ft	1581 m 5,187 ft	357 km 222 mi	66.9354°N 36.7873°W
32	Blaskbjerg	Island of Greenland	1600 m 5,249 ft	1575 m 5,167 ft	17.46 km 10.85 mi	73.3000°N 24.0333°W
33	Kinaussak	Island of Greenland	1630 m 5,348 ft	1555 m 5,102 ft	88.3 km 54.9 mi	64.4500°N 50.5167°W
34	Gaaseland high point	Island of Greenland	2100 m 6,890 ft	1550 m 5,085 ft	135.6 km 84.3 mi	70.2000°N 27.6667°W
35	Sangmissoq high point (Note: Sangmissoq high point is the southernmost 1000-meter (3281-foot) summit of Greenland.)	Island of Sangmissoq	1549 m 5,082 ft	1549 m 5,082 ft	35.5 km 22.1 mi	60.0502°N 43.9164°W
36	Favres Bjerg	Island of Greenland	2000 m 6,562 ft	1546 m 5,072 ft	117.1 km 72.8 mi	73.9500°N 23.2000°W
37	Johnstrup Bjerge	Island of Greenland	2000 m 6,562 ft	1540 m 5,052 ft	30.9 km 19.21 mi	73.0000°N 25.5333°W
38	Berzelius Bjerg	Island of Greenland	1810 m 5,938 ft	1535 m 5,036 ft	38.5 km 23.9 mi	72.4667°N 25.0667°W
39	Ammassalik Island high point	Ammassalik Island	1335 m 4,380 ft	1335 m 4,380 ft	32.8 km 20.4 mi	65.8343°N 37.6118°W
40	Petermann Bjerg	Island of Greenland	2933 m 9,623 ft	1200 m 3,937 ft	288 km 179.1 mi	73.0905°N 28.6187°W

== Most isolated major summits ==
Of the most isolated major summits of Greenland, only Gunnbjørn Fjeld exceeds 3000 kilometers (1864 miles) of topographic isolation. Four peaks exceed 500 kilometers (310.7 miles) of topographic isolation, 13 peaks exceed 200 kilometers (124.3 miles), and 21 peaks exceed 100 kilometers (62.14 miles) of topographic isolation.

The 40 most topographically isolated summits of Greenland with at least 500 meters of topographic prominence
Rank	Mountain peak	Island	Elevation	Prominence	Isolation	Location
1	Gunnbjørn Fjeld	Island of Greenland	3694 m 12,119 ft	3694 m 12,119 ft	3,254.13	68.9184°N 29.8991°W
2	Avannaarsua high point	Island of Greenland	2600 m 8,530 ft	500 m 1,640 ft	636 km 395 mi	77.5000°N 47.6167°W
3	Perserajoq	Island of Greenland	2259 m 7,411 ft	2009 m 6,591 ft	527 km 328 mi	71.4000°N 51.9667°W
4	Peary Land high point (Note: The apex of Peary Land is the northernmost summit of its elevation of Greenland and greater North America.)	Island of Greenland	1910 m 6,266 ft	500 m 1,640 ft	509 km 317 mi	83.3167°N 35.3333°W
5	Greenland Ice Sheet high point	Island of Greenland	3238 m 10,623 ft	500 m 1,640 ft	476 km 296 mi	72.4667°N 37.1000°W
6	Sukkertoppen	Island of Greenland	2440 m 8,005 ft	500 m 1,640 ft	401 km 249 mi	66.2000°N 52.3500°W
7	Haffner Bjerg (Note: Haffner Bjerg is the westernmost 1000-meter (3281-foot) summit in Greenland.)	Island of Greenland	1050 m 3,445 ft	500 m 1,640 ft	393 km 244 mi	76.3426°N 62.3453°W
8	Reval Toppen	Island of Greenland	2320 m 7,612 ft	500 m 1,640 ft	368 km 229 mi	76.6606°N 25.7067°W
9	Mont Forel	Island of Greenland	3391 m 11,125 ft	1581 m 5,187 ft	357 km 222 mi	66.9354°N 36.7873°W
10	Hahn Land high point	Island of Greenland	1744 m 5,722 ft	1694 m 5,558 ft	347 km 216 mi	80.4333°N 19.8333°W
11	Patuersoq	Island of Greenland	2740 m 8,990 ft	500 m 1,640 ft	291 km 181.1 mi	60.8333°N 44.2333°W
12	Petermann Bjerg	Island of Greenland	2933 m 9,623 ft	1200 m 3,937 ft	288 km 179.1 mi	73.0905°N 28.6187°W
13	Point 1740	Island of Greenland	1740 m 5,709 ft	500 m 1,640 ft	263 km 163.4 mi	63.6667°N 50.2167°W
14	Point 813 (Note: Point 813 is the westernmost 500-meter (1640-foot) summit in Greenland.)	Island of Greenland	813 m 2,667 ft	500 m 1,640 ft	168 km 104.4 mi	76.4035°N 68.7271°W
15	Dansketinden	Island of Greenland	2842 m 9,324 ft	2257 m 7,405 ft	164.9 km 102.5 mi	72.1262°N 24.9512°W
16	Azimuthbjerg	Island of Skjoldungen	1738 m 5,702 ft	1738 m 5,702 ft	140.5 km 87.3 mi	63.4552°N 41.8508°W
17	Gaaseland high point	Island of Greenland	2100 m 6,890 ft	1550 m 5,085 ft	135.6 km 84.3 mi	70.2000°N 27.6667°W
18	Point 574	Island of Greenland	574 m 1,883 ft	500 m 1,640 ft	122.2 km 76 mi	82.0000°N 59.1667°W
19	J.A.D. Jensen Nunatakker	Island of Greenland	1668 m 5,472 ft	500 m 1,640 ft	119.5 km 74.2 mi	62.7920°N 48.8483°W
20	Favres Bjerg	Island of Greenland	2000 m 6,562 ft	1546 m 5,072 ft	117.1 km 72.8 mi	73.9500°N 23.2000°W
21	Renland high point	Island of Greenland	2200 m 7,218 ft	1950 m 6,398 ft	100.8 km 62.6 mi	71.3333°N 26.3333°W
22	Schweizerland high point	Island of Greenland	1671 m 5,482 ft	1596 m 5,236 ft	95.4 km 59.3 mi	66.1203°N 37.4420°W
23	Kloftbjerge	Island of Greenland	2163 m 7,096 ft	1613 m 5,292 ft	92.3 km 57.4 mi	71.3333°N 25.7500°W
24	Kinaussak	Island of Greenland	1630 m 5,348 ft	1555 m 5,102 ft	88.3 km 54.9 mi	64.4500°N 50.5167°W
25	Nuussuaq high point	Island of Greenland	2144 m 7,034 ft	1669 m 5,476 ft	86.6 km 53.8 mi	70.6966°N 52.9728°W
26	Clavering Island high point	Clavering Island	1604 m 5,262 ft	1604 m 5,262 ft	77.1 km 47.9 mi	74.3667°N 21.1833°W
27	Margaretatopp	Island of Greenland	2360 m 7,743 ft	1585 m 5,200 ft	69 km 42.9 mi	73.3667°N 26.3000°W
28	Alabama Nunatak	Island of Greenland	993 m 3,258 ft	500 m 1,640 ft	62.3 km 38.7 mi	77.9329°N 23.8749°W
29	Milne Land high point	Island of Milne Land	2050 m 6,726 ft	2050 m 6,726 ft	58.1 km 36.1 mi	70.8194°N 26.5956°W
30	Hardersbjerg	Island of Greenland	1679 m 5,509 ft	1658 m 5,440 ft	56.2 km 34.9 mi	73.4333°N 22.8333°W
31	Traill Island high point	Traill Island	1884 m 6,181 ft	1884 m 6,181 ft	50.8 km 31.6 mi	72.7167°N 24.0667°W
32	Paatuut	Island of Greenland	2010 m 6,594 ft	1585 m 5,200 ft	45.8 km 28.4 mi	70.2966°N 52.7017°W
33	Appaalik	Agpat Island	1711 m 5,614 ft	1711 m 5,614 ft	45.6 km 28.3 mi	70.9474°N 51.9918°W
34	Angelin Bjerg	Ymer Island	1900 m 6,234 ft	1900 m 6,234 ft	43.7 km 27.1 mi	73.1667°N 24.3167°W
35	Klosterbjerge	Island of Greenland	2410 m 7,907 ft	1635 m 5,364 ft	38.8 km 24.1 mi	72.2500°N 25.9500°W
36	Berzelius Bjerg	Island of Greenland	1810 m 5,938 ft	1535 m 5,036 ft	38.5 km 23.9 mi	72.4667°N 25.0667°W
37	Mara Mountain (Note: Mara Mountain is the northernmost 1000-meter (3281-foot) summit on Earth.)	Island of Greenland	1155 m 3,790 ft	1149 m 3,770 ft	37.5 km 23.3 mi	83.5715°N 30.4784°W
38	Parnaqussuit Qavaat high point	Island of Greenland	1860 m 6,102 ft	1820 m 5,971 ft	36.9 km 23 mi	66.4333°N 52.9167°W
39	Sangmissoq high point	Island of Sangmissoq	1549 m 5,082 ft	1549 m 5,082 ft	35.5 km 22.1 mi	60.0502°N 43.9164°W
40	Snehaetten	Qeqertaq Island	1765 m 5,791 ft	1765 m 5,791 ft	34.4 km 21.4 mi	71.6542°N 53.1641°W

== Gallery ==
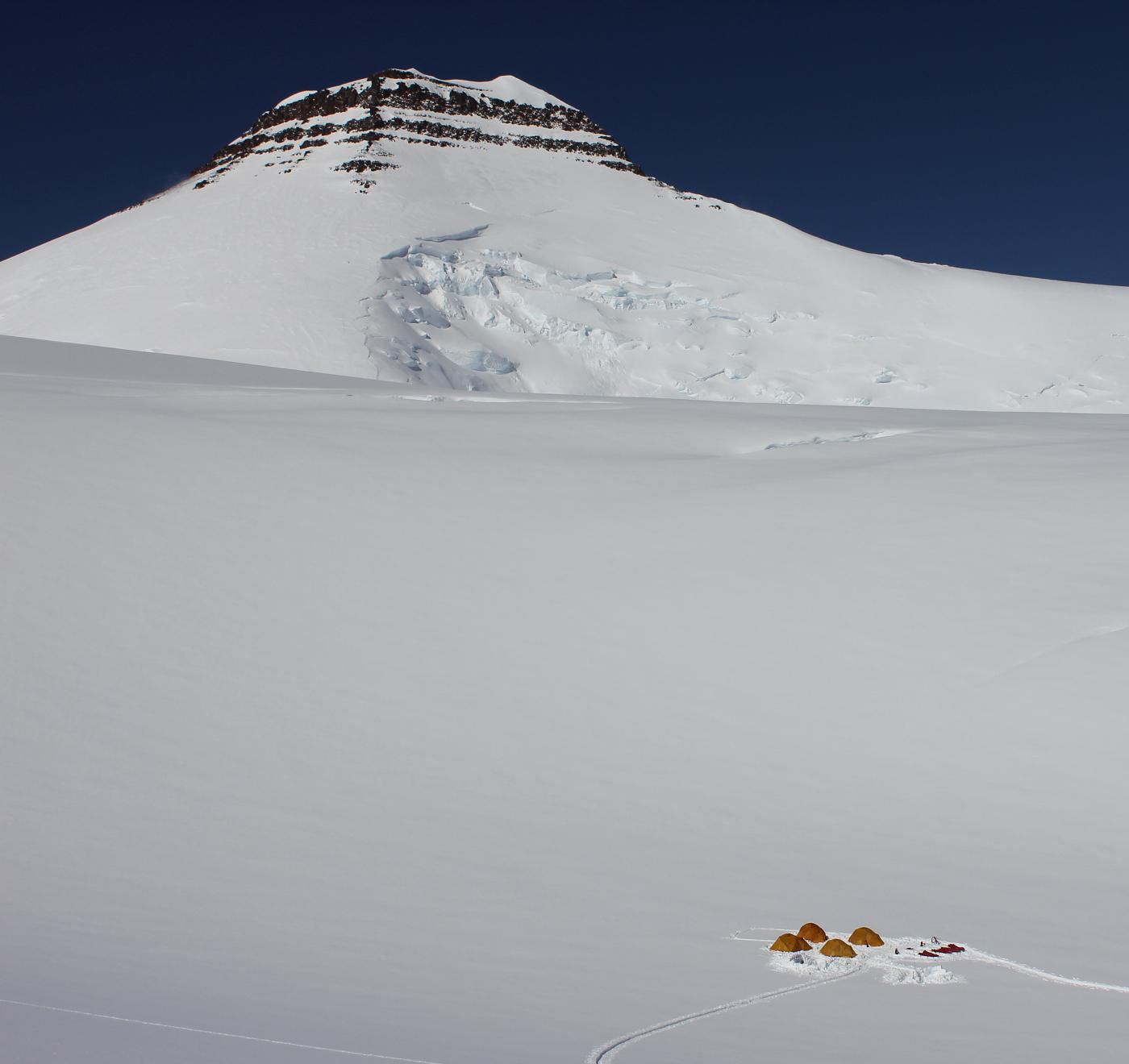
The summit of Gunnbjørn Fjeld is the highest point on the Island of Greenland, Kalaallit Nunaat, the Kingdom of Denmark, and the entire Arctic.

== See also ==
- List of mountain peaks of North America
  - List of mountain peaks of Greenland
  - List of mountain peaks of Canada
  - List of mountain peaks of the Rocky Mountains
  - List of mountain peaks of the United States
  - List of mountain peaks of México
  - List of mountain peaks of Central America
  - List of mountain peaks of the Caribbean
- Physical geography
  - Topography
    - Topographic elevation
    - Topographic prominence
    - Topographic isolation
