= List of ultras of Greenland =

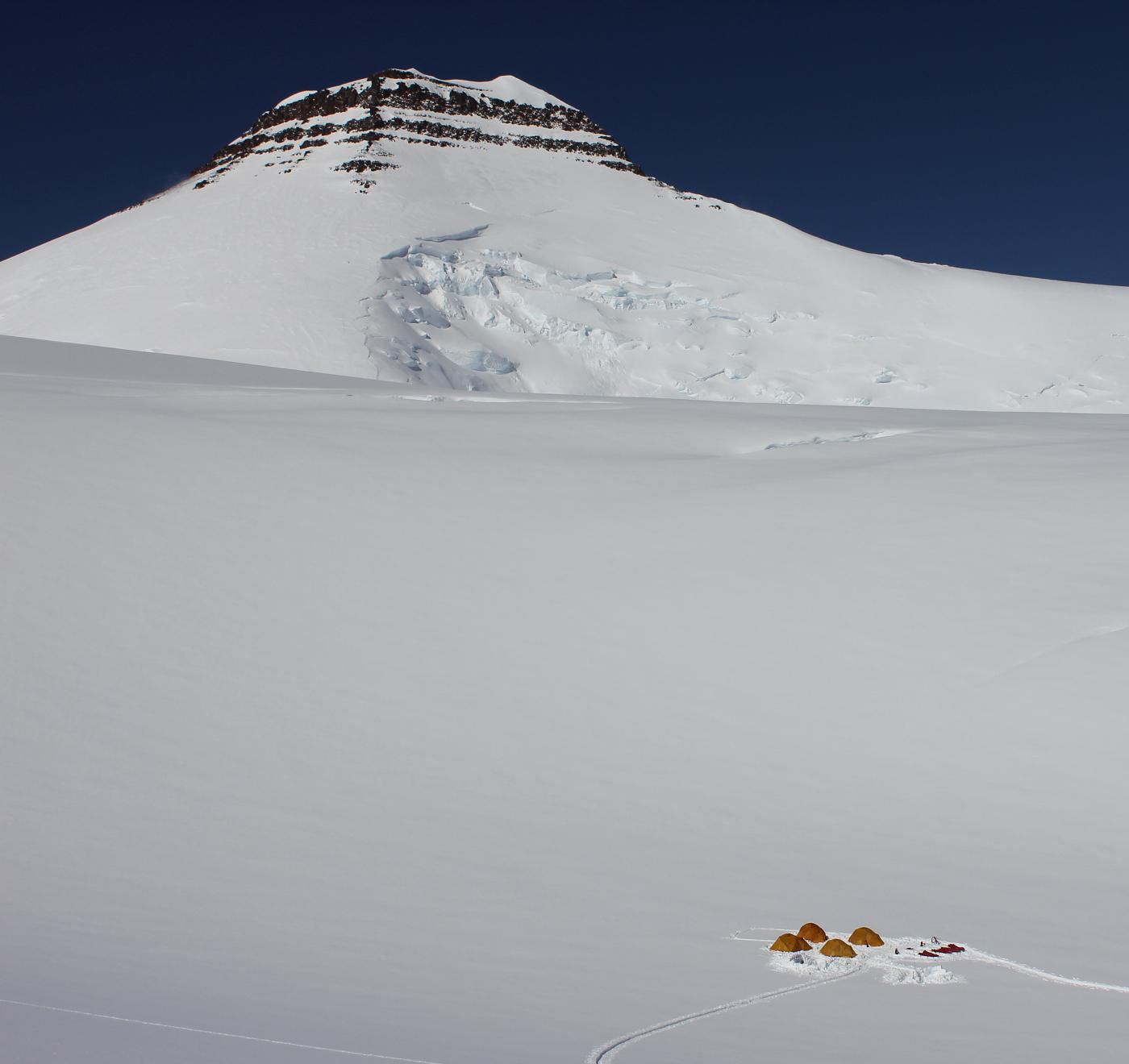
The summit of Gunnbjørn Fjeld is the highest point on the Island of Greenland, Kalaallit Nunaat, the Kingdom of Denmark, and the entire Arctic.

The following sortable table comprises the 38 ultra-prominent summits of the nation of Greenland (Kalaallit Nunaat). Each of these peaks has at least 1500 meters (4921 feet) of topographic prominence.

The summit of a mountain or hill may be measured in three principal ways:

1. The topographic elevation of a summit measures the height of the summit above a geodetic sea level.
2. The topographic prominence of a summit is a measure of how high the summit rises above its surroundings.
3. The topographic isolation (or radius of dominance) of a summit measures how far the summit lies from its nearest point of equal elevation.

== Ultra-prominent summits ==
Gunnbjørn Fjeld exceeds 3000 meters (9843 feet) of topographic prominence. Six peaks of Greenland exceed 2000 meters (6562 feet), and the following 38 peaks are ultra-prominent summits with at least 1500 meters (4921 feet) of topographic prominence.

The 38 ultra-prominent mountain peaks of Greenland
Rank	Mountain Peak	Island	Elevation	Prominence	Isolation	Location
1	Gunnbjørn Fjeld (Note: The summit of Gunnbjørn Fjeld is the highest point of the Island of Greenland, Kalaallit Nunaat, the Kingdom of Denmark, and the entire Arctic.) (Note: Gunnbjørn Fjeld is the easternmost summit of its elevation in greater North America.)	Island of Greenland	3694 m 12,119 ft	3694 m 12,119 ft	3,254.13	68.9184°N 29.8991°W
2	Stauning Alper (Note: Stauning Alper is the easternmost summit of its elevation of Greenland and greater North America.)	Island of Greenland	2831 m 9,288 ft	2181 m 7,156 ft	164.9 km 102.5 mi	72.1167°N 24.9000°W
3	Palup Qaqa high point	Upernivik Island	2105 m 6,906 ft	2105 m 6,906 ft	31.2 km 19.4 mi	71.3333°N 52.8167°W
4	Milne Land high point	Island of Milne Land	2050 m 6,726 ft	2050 m 6,726 ft	58.1 km 36.1 mi	70.8194°N 26.5956°W
5	Payers Tinde	Island of Greenland	2320 m 7,612 ft	2045 m 6,709 ft	26.1 km 16.24 mi	73.1333°N 26.3667°W
6	Perserajoq	Island of Greenland	2259 m 7,411 ft	2009 m 6,591 ft	527 km 328 mi	71.4000°N 51.9667°W
7	Renland high point	Island of Greenland	2200 m 7,218 ft	1950 m 6,398 ft	100.8 km 62.6 mi	71.3333°N 26.3333°W
8	Pyramiden (Note: The summit of Pyramiden is the highest point of Disko Island.) (Note: Pyramiden is the westernmost summit of its elevation in the Greenland.)	Disko Island	1904 m 6,247 ft	1904 m 6,247 ft	32.7 km 20.3 mi	70.1195°N 53.3890°W
9	Angelin Bjerg (Note: The summit of Angelin Bjerg is the highest point of Ymer Island.)	Ymer Island	1900 m 6,234 ft	1900 m 6,234 ft	43.7 km 27.1 mi	73.1667°N 24.3167°W
10	Traill Island high point	Traill Island	1884 m 6,181 ft	1884 m 6,181 ft	50.8 km 31.6 mi	72.7167°N 24.0667°W
11	Parnaqussuit Qavaat high point	Island of Greenland	1860 m 6,102 ft	1820 m 5,971 ft	36.9 km 23 mi	66.4333°N 52.9167°W
12	Storo high point	Island of Storo	1770 m 5,807 ft	1770 m 5,807 ft	32.6 km 20.3 mi	70.8333°N 27.4833°W
13	Snehaetten (Note: The summit of Snehaetten is the highest point of the Qeqertaq Island.)	Qeqertaq Island	1765 m 5,791 ft	1765 m 5,791 ft	34.4 km 21.4 mi	71.6542°N 53.1641°W
14	Azimuthbjerg (Note: The summit of Azimuthbjerg is the highest point of the island of Skjoldungen.)	Island of Skjoldungen	1738 m 5,702 ft	1738 m 5,702 ft	140.5 km 87.3 mi	63.4552°N 41.8508°W
15	Svedenborg Bjerg (Note: The summit of Svedenborg Bjerg is the highest point of Geographical Society Island.)	Geographical Society Island	1730 m 5,676 ft	1730 m 5,676 ft	24.9 km 15.48 mi	72.9436°N 24.3412°W
16	Appaalik (Note: The summit of Appaalik is the highest point of Appat Island.)	Appat Island	1711 m 5,614 ft	1711 m 5,614 ft	45.6 km 28.3 mi	70.9474°N 51.9918°W
17	Hahn Land high point (Note: The apex of Hahn Land is the easternmost ultra-prominent summit of Greenland and greater North America.)	Island of Greenland	1744 m 5,722 ft	1694 m 5,558 ft	347 km 216 mi	80.4333°N 19.8333°W
18	Nuussuaq high point (Note: The apex of the Nuussuaq Peninsula is the westernmost 2000-meter (6562-foot) summit in Greenland.)	Island of Greenland	2144 m 7,034 ft	1669 m 5,476 ft	86.6 km 53.8 mi	70.6966°N 52.9728°W
19	Hardersbjerg	Island of Greenland	1679 m 5,509 ft	1658 m 5,440 ft	56.2 km 34.9 mi	73.4333°N 22.8333°W
20	Klosterbjerge	Island of Greenland	2410 m 7,907 ft	1635 m 5,364 ft	38.8 km 24.1 mi	72.2500°N 25.9500°W
21	Qingagssat Qaqit (Note: Qingagssat Qaqit is the southernmost summit of its elevation in Greenland.)	Island of Greenland	1782 m 5,846 ft	1632 m 5,354 ft	23.3 km 14.47 mi	60.5654°N 44.6949°W
22	Ejnar Mikkelsen Fjeld (Note: Ejnar Mikkelsen Fjeld is the easternmost 3000-meter (9843-foot) summit of Greenland and greater North America.)	Island of Greenland	3325 m 10,909 ft	1625 m 5,331 ft	16.29 km 10.12 mi	68.8957°N 28.6279°W
23	Agssaussat	Island of Greenland	2140 m 7,021 ft	1615 m 5,299 ft	18.06 km 11.22 mi	65.8833°N 52.1167°W
24	Kloftbjerge	Island of Greenland	2163 m 7,096 ft	1613 m 5,292 ft	92.3 km 57.4 mi	71.3333°N 25.7500°W
25	Salliaruseq high point	Salliaruseq Island	1610 m 5,282 ft	1610 m 5,282 ft	29.5 km 18.32 mi	64.3913°N 51.1134°W
26	Clavering Island high point	Clavering Island	1604 m 5,262 ft	1604 m 5,262 ft	77.1 km 47.9 mi	74.3667°N 21.1833°W
27	Schweizerland high point	Island of Greenland	1671 m 5,482 ft	1596 m 5,236 ft	95.4 km 59.3 mi	66.1203°N 37.4420°W
28	Margaretatopp	Island of Greenland	2360 m 7,743 ft	1585 m 5,200 ft	69 km 42.9 mi	73.3667°N 26.3000°W
28	Paatuut	Island of Greenland	2010 m 6,594 ft	1585 m 5,200 ft	45.8 km 28.4 mi	70.2966°N 52.7017°W
28	Agdleruussakasit (Note: Agdleruussakasit is the southernmost summit of its elevation in Greenland.)	Island of Greenland	1763 m 5,784 ft	1585 m 5,200 ft	5.75 km 3.57 mi	60.1364°N 44.5293°W
31	Mont Forel (Note: Mont Forel is the southernmost and westernmost summit of its elevation in Greenland.)	Schweizerland	3391 m 11,125 ft	1581 m 5,187 ft	357 km 222 mi	66.9354°N 36.7873°W
32	Blaskbjerg	Island of Greenland	1600 m 5,249 ft	1575 m 5,167 ft	17.46 km 10.85 mi	73.3000°N 24.0333°W
33	Kinaussak	Island of Greenland	1630 m 5,348 ft	1555 m 5,102 ft	88.3 km 54.9 mi	64.4500°N 50.5167°W
34	Gaaseland high point	Island of Greenland	2100 m 6,890 ft	1550 m 5,085 ft	135.6 km 84.3 mi	70.2000°N 27.6667°W
35	Sangmissoq high point (Note: Sangmissoq high point is the southernmost 1000-meter (3281-foot) summit of Greenland.)	Island of Sammisoq	1549 m 5,082 ft	1549 m 5,082 ft	35.5 km 22.1 mi	60.0502°N 43.9164°W
36	Favres Bjerg (Note: Favres Bjerg is the easternmost 2000-meter (6562-foot) summit of Greenland and greater North America.)	Island of Greenland	2000 m 6,562 ft	1546 m 5,072 ft	117.1 km 72.8 mi	73.9500°N 23.2000°W
37	Johnstrup Bjerge	Island of Greenland	2000 m 6,562 ft	1540 m 5,052 ft	30.9 km 19.21 mi	73.0000°N 25.5333°W
38	Berzelius Bjerg	Island of Greenland	1810 m 5,938 ft	1535 m 5,036 ft	38.5 km 23.9 mi	72.4667°N 25.0667°W

== Gallery ==
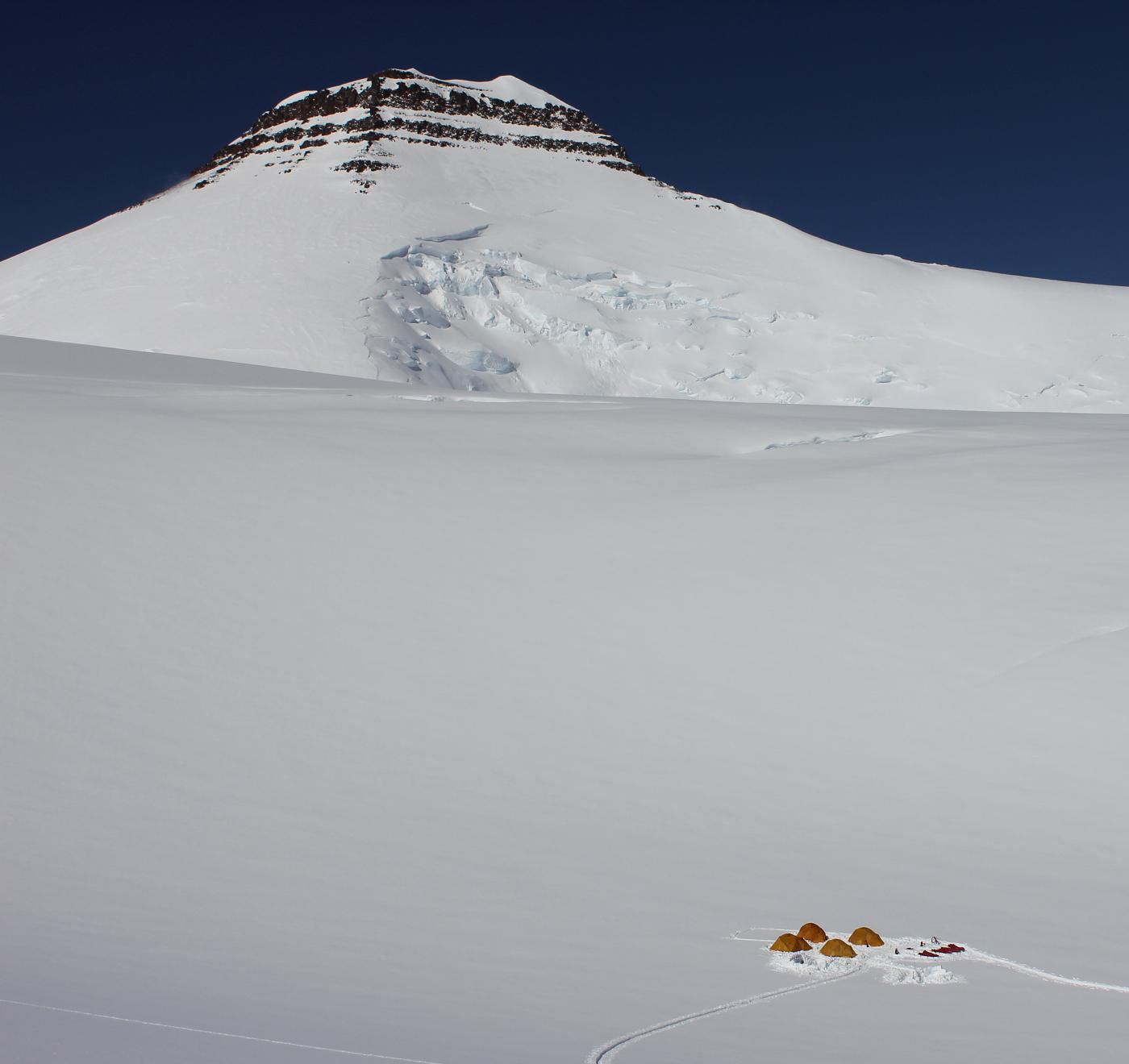
The summit of Gunnbjørn Fjeld is the highest point on the Island of Greenland, Kalaallit Nunaat, the Kingdom of Denmark, and the entire Arctic.

== See also ==
- List of mountain peaks of North America
  - List of mountain peaks of Greenland
    - List of the ultra-prominent summits of Greenland
  - List of mountain peaks of Canada
  - List of mountain peaks of the Rocky Mountains
  - List of mountain peaks of the United States
  - List of mountain peaks of México
  - List of mountain peaks of Central America
  - List of mountain peaks of the Caribbean
- Greenland
  - Geography of Greenland
  - Geology of Greenland
    - Category:Mountains of Greenland
      - commons:Category:Mountains of Greenland
- Physical geography
  - Topography
    - Topographic elevation
    - Topographic prominence
    - Topographic isolation

=== Other mountains ===
- Angiartarfik
- Nalumasortoq
- Tiningnertok (Apostelen Tommelfinger)
- Ulamertorsuaq
