= Petermann Peak =

Mountain in Greenland

- Petermann Bjerg
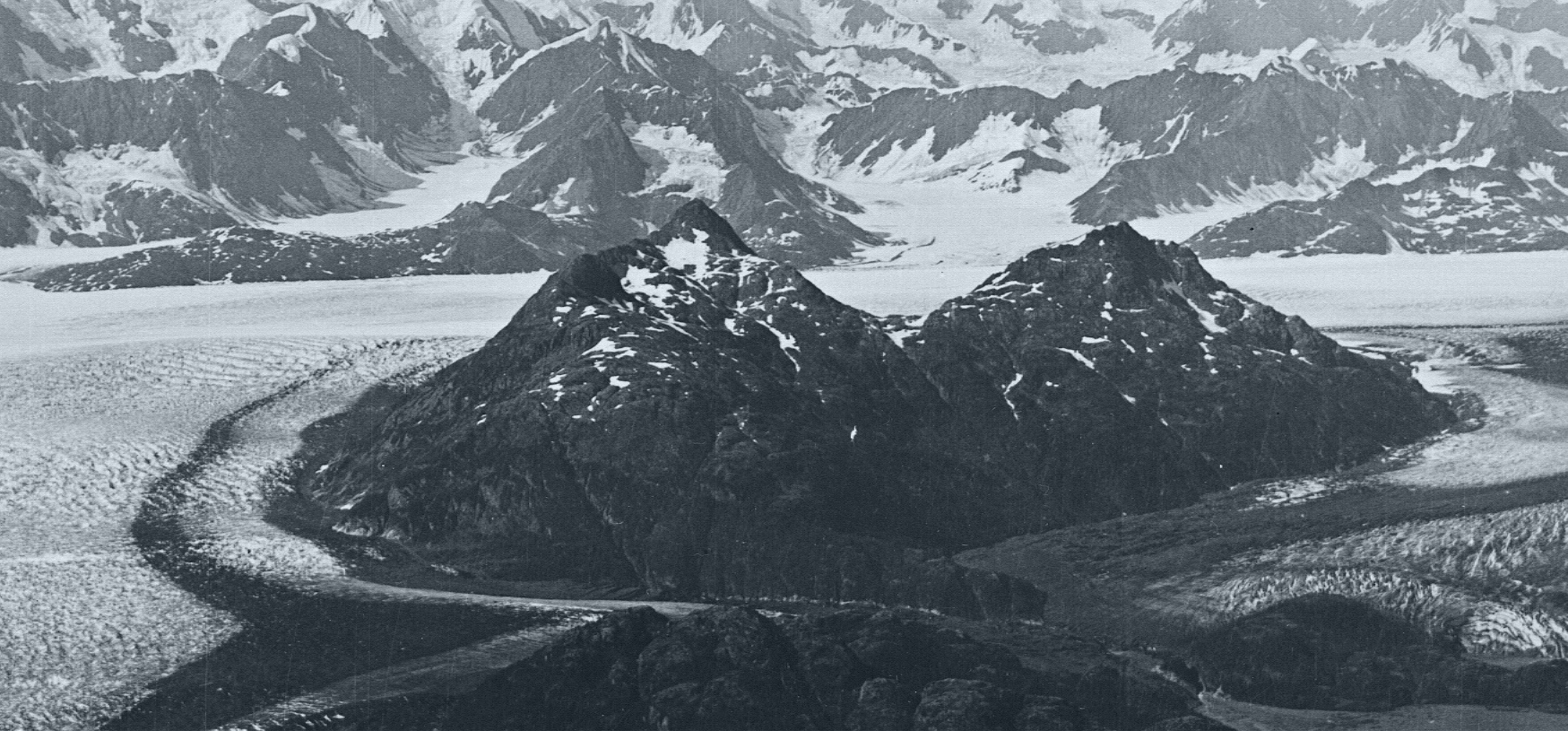
- Aerial view from the north in 1988

Highest point
- Elevation: 2,943 m (9,656 ft)
- Listing: North America prominent peaks; North America most isolated peaks; North America Ultra prominent peak; Greenland Ultra prominent peak
- Coordinates: 73°5′24″N 26°23′25″W

Geography
- Location within Greenland
- Location: Fraenkel Land, NE Greenland

Climbing
- First ascent: 1929

Petermann Peak (Danish: Petermann Bjerg), also known as Petermann Fjeld, Petermanns Topp and Petermann Point is a mountain in King Christian X Land, Northeast Greenland. Administratively it is part of the Northeast Greenland National Park zone.

The area around Petermann Peak is uninhabited. This mountain is located in the high Arctic zone, where Polar climate prevails. The average annual temperature in the area is −16 °C. The warmest month is June, when the average temperature rises to −2 °C, and the coldest is January, with −22 °C.

== Geography ==
Petermann Peak rises to a height of 2,943 metres (9,656 ft) on a nunatak located the northern side of the Nordenskiöld Glacier, in western Fraenkel Land in the inner Kaiser Franz Joseph Fjord. It has a magnificent appearance, dominating the surrounding landscape. The Gregory Glacier flows from its northeastern side into the Knækdalen valley. The Kalifbjerg (2667 m), Kerberus (c. 2500 m), Gog (c. 2600 m) and Magog (c. 2400 m) peaks are located to the north of Petermann Peak. Initially believed to be the highest peak in Greenland, this mountain is one of the most renowned summits in northeastern Greenland together with Payer Peak located nearby.

The Petermann Peak is marked as a 2,940-metre-high (9,646 ft) peak in the Defense Mapping Agency Greenland Navigation charts and as a 2,790-metre-high (9,154 ft) mountain in other sources.

=== Historical background ===
Petermann Peak was first seen in August 1870 by Julius Payer and Ralph Copeland when they climbed Payer Peak. It was named Petermanns Spitze by Carl Koldewey during the Second German North Polar Expedition he led while first surveying and partially exploring Kaiser Franz Joseph Fjord in 1869–70. The peak was named after German geographer August Heinrich Petermann (1822–78) who was a great supporter of the expedition. In 1899 A.G. Nathorst mistook a lower peak in the vicinity, now named Nathorst Tinde, for Petermann Bjerg. At the turn of the century Petermann Peak was assumed to be the highest peak in all Greenland.

The first ascent of the peak was made on 15 August 1929 by the Cambridge Expedition to East Greenland led by Scottish polar explorer James Wordie (1890–1962). the second ascent by John Haller and Wolfgang Diehl on 9 August 1951.

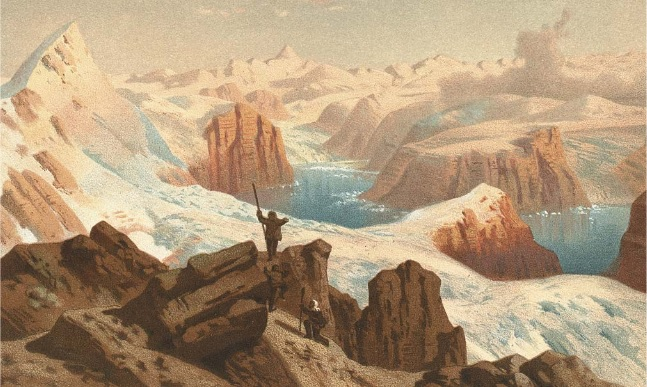
Representation of the 12 August 1870 discovery of Petermann Peak by Julius Payer, Ralph Copeland and Peter Ellinger after climbing onto Payer Peak.

Map of Northeastern Greenland.

== See also ==
- List of mountain peaks of Greenland
- List of mountains in Greenland
- List of the ultra-prominent summits of North America
- List of the major 100-kilometer summits of North America
