= Geography of Greenland =

Greenland
Native name: Grønland Kalaallit Nunaat
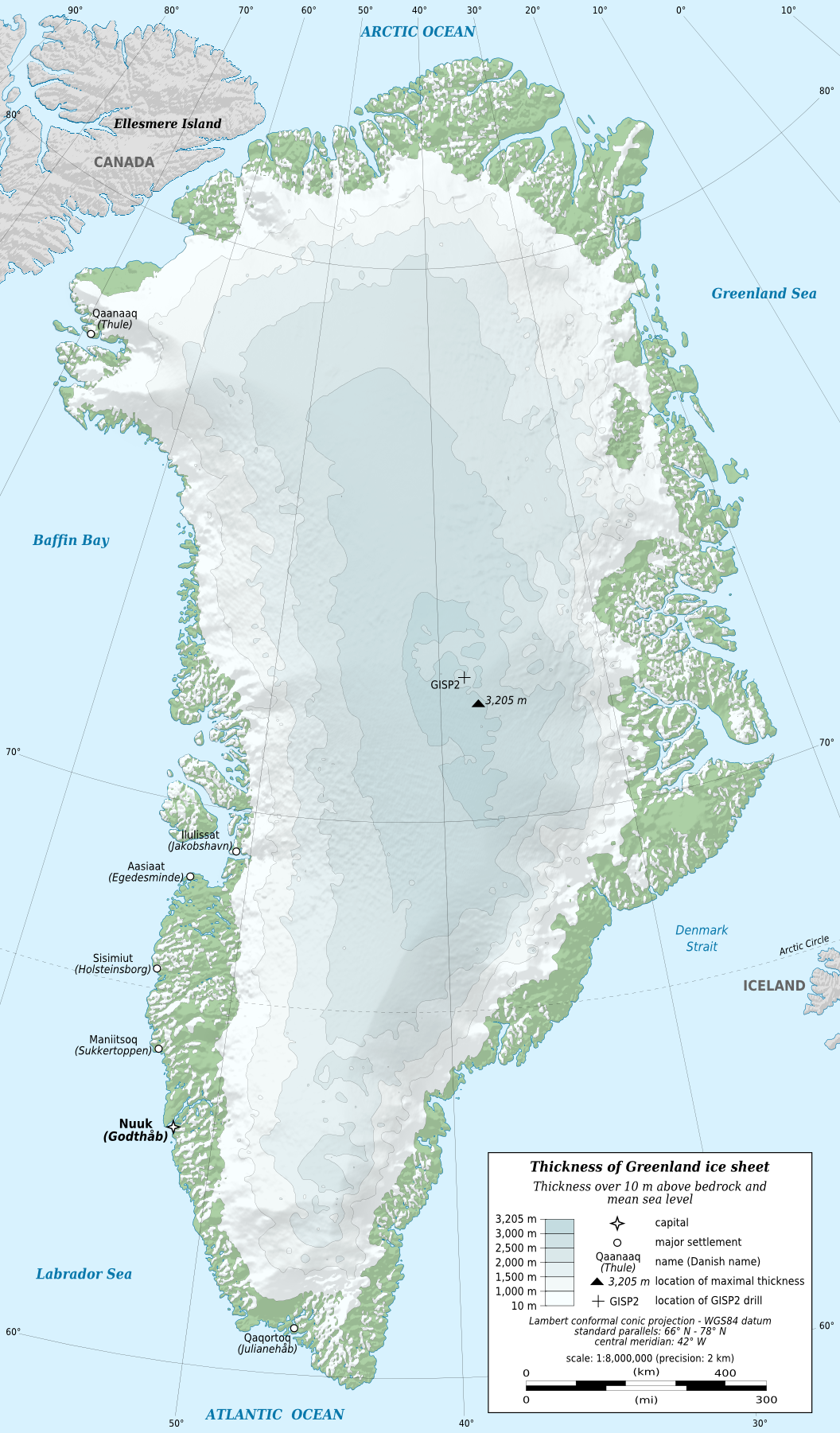
- Outline map of Greenland with ice sheet depths. (Much of the area in green has permanent snow cover, but less than 10m (33ft) thick.)
- Interactive map of Greenland

Geography
- Location: Between the Arctic Ocean and the North Atlantic Ocean
- Coordinates: 64°10′N 51°43′W
- Area: 2,166,086 km^{2} (836,330 sq mi)
- Area rank: 1st
- Coastline: 44,087 km (27394.4 mi)
- Highest elevation: 3,694 m (12119 ft)
- Highest point: Gunnbjørn

Administration
- Kingdom of Denmark
- Province: Greenland
- Largest settlement: Nuuk (Godthåb) (pop. 17,984)

Demographics
- Population: 56,732 (8 February 2020)
- Pop. density: 0.028/km^{2} (0.073/sq mi)
- Ethnic groups: 88% Inuit (Inuit-Danish and Inuit-European mixed); 12% Europeans, mostly Danish.

Greenland is located between the Arctic Ocean and the North Atlantic Ocean, northeast of Canada and northwest of Iceland. The territory comprises the island of Greenland—the largest island in the world—and more than a hundred other smaller islands (see alphabetic list). Greenland has a 1.2-kilometre-long (0.75 mi) border with Canada on Hans Island. A sparse population is confined to small settlements along certain sectors of the coast. Greenland possesses the world's second-largest ice sheet.

Greenland sits atop the Greenland plate, a subplate of the North American Plate. The Greenland craton is made up of some of the oldest rocks on the face of the earth. The Isua greenstone belt in southwestern Greenland contains some of the oldest dated rocks on Earth, dated at 3.7–3.8 billion years old.

The vegetation is generally sparse, with the only patch of forested land being found in Nanortalik Municipality in the extreme south near Cape Farewell.

The climate is arctic to subarctic, with cool summers and cold winters. The terrain is mostly a flat but gradually sloping icecap that covers all land except for a narrow, mountainous, barren, rocky coast. The lowest elevation is sea level and the highest elevation is the summit of Gunnbjørn Fjeld, the highest point in the Arctic at 3,694 metres (12,119 ft). The northernmost point of the island of Greenland is Cape Morris Jesup, discovered by Admiral Robert Peary in 1900. Natural resources include zinc, lead, iron ore, coal, molybdenum, gold, platinum, uranium, hydropower and fish.

== Area ==
Total area: 2,166,086 km^{2}

Land area: 2,166,086 km^{2} (410,449 km^{2} ice-free, 1,755,637 km^{2} ice-covered)

Maritime claims:

Territorial sea: 3 nautical miles (5.6 km; 3.5 mi)

Exclusive fishing zone: 200 nautical miles (370.4 km; 230.2 mi)

== Land use ==
Arable land: estimated at approximately 243,000 ha. or 0.1% of total land area; some land is used to grow silage.
Permanent crops: Approximately 0%
Other: 100% (2012 est.)

The total population comprises around 56,000 inhabitants, of whom approximately 18,000 live in the capital, Nuuk.

== Natural hazards ==
Continuous ice sheet covers 84% of the country; the rest is permafrost.

== Environment – current issues ==
Protection of the Arctic environment, climate change, pollution of the food chain, excessive hunting of endangered species (walrus, polar bears, narwhal, beluga whale and several sea birds).

== Climate ==
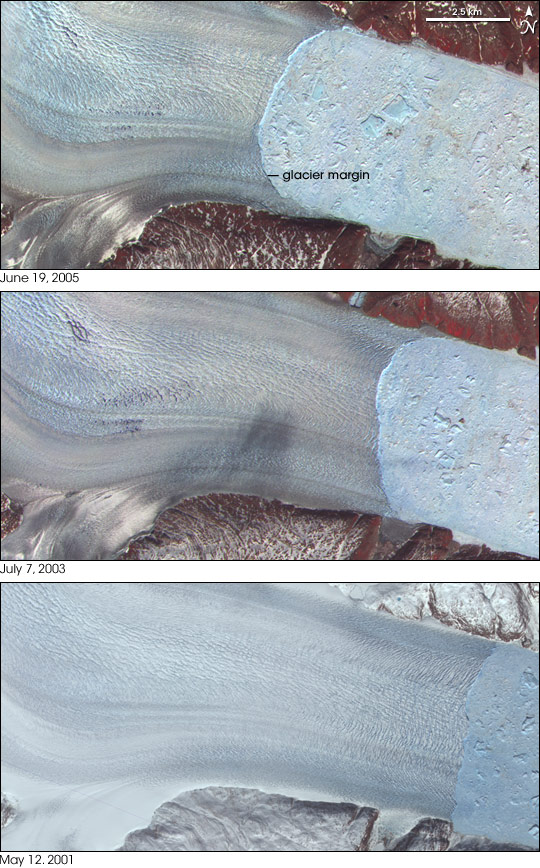
Retreat of the Helheim Glacier, Greenland

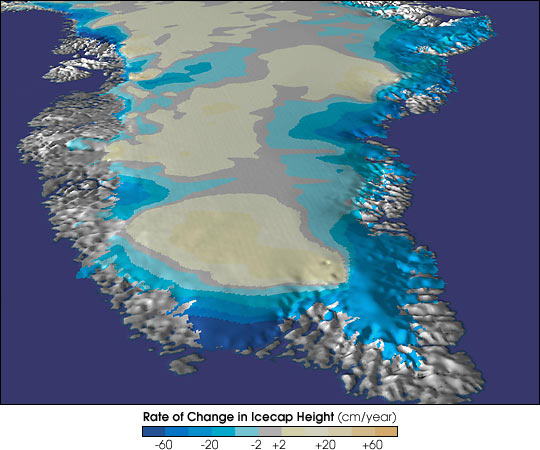
Map of Greenland's rate of change in ice sheet height

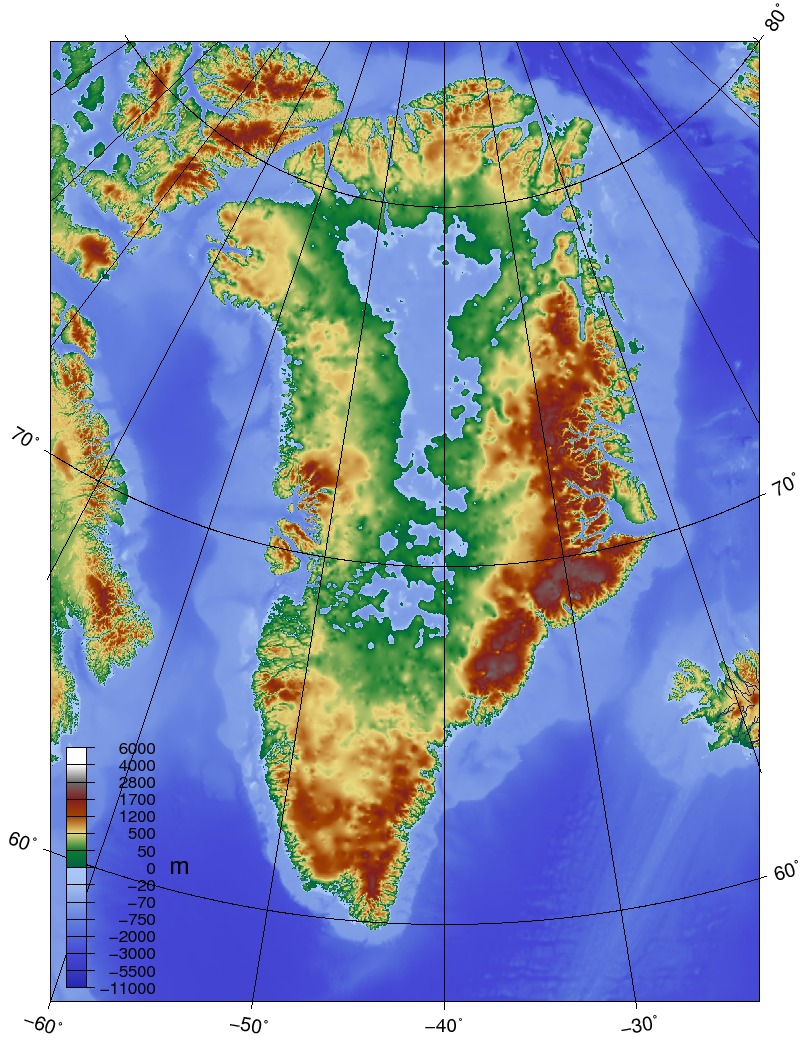
Map of Greenland bedrock

Köppen–Geiger climate classification map at 1-km resolution for Greenland 1991–2020

Greenland's climate is a tundra climate on and near the coasts and an ice cap climate in inland areas. It typically has short, cool summers and long, moderately cold winters.

Due to Gulf Stream influences, Greenland's winter temperatures are very mild for its latitude. In Nuuk, the capital, average winter temperatures are only −9 °C (16 °F). In comparison, the average winter temperatures for Iqaluit, Nunavut, Canada, are around −27 °C (−17 °F). Conversely, summer temperatures are very low, with an average high around 10 °C (50 °F). This is too low to sustain trees, and the land is treeless tundra.

On the Greenland ice sheet, the temperature is far below freezing throughout the year, and record high temperatures have peaked only slightly above freezing. The record high temperature at Summit Camp is 2.2 °C (36.0 °F).

In the far south of Greenland, there is a very small forest in the Qinngua Valley, due to summer temperatures being barely high enough to sustain trees. There are mountains over 1,500 metres (4,900 ft) high surrounding the valley, which protect it from cold, fast winds travelling across the ice sheet. It is the only natural forest in Greenland, but is only 15 kilometres (9.3 mi) long.

Climate data for Nuuk
Month	Jan	Feb	Mar	Apr	May	Jun	Jul	Aug	Sep	Oct	Nov	Dec	Year
Record high °C (°F)	13.5 (56.3)	13.0 (55.4)	13.2 (55.8)	14.6 (58.3)	18.3 (64.9)	23.8 (74.8)	26.3 (79.3)	25.1 (77.2)	23.8 (74.8)	19.9 (67.8)	15.8 (60.4)	13.2 (55.8)	26.3 (79.3)
Mean daily maximum °C (°F)	−5.6 (21.9)	−6.3 (20.7)	−6.8 (19.8)	−1.4 (29.5)	3.4 (38.1)	7.7 (45.9)	10.2 (50.4)	10.4 (50.7)	6.3 (43.3)	1.8 (35.2)	−1.1 (30.0)	−3.4 (25.9)	1.3 (34.3)
Daily mean °C (°F)	−8.2 (17.2)	−9.1 (15.6)	−9.2 (15.4)	−3.6 (25.5)	0.8 (33.4)	4.4 (39.9)	6.8 (44.2)	7.3 (45.1)	3.7 (38.7)	−0.3 (31.5)	−3.4 (25.9)	−5.8 (21.6)	−1.4 (29.5)
Mean daily minimum °C (°F)	−10.4 (13.3)	−11.5 (11.3)	−11.4 (11.5)	−5.7 (21.7)	−2.5 (27.5)	1.7 (35.1)	3.8 (38.8)	4.0 (39.2)	2.8 (37.0)	−2.1 (28.2)	−5.4 (22.3)	−8 (18)	−3.7 (25.3)
Record low °C (°F)	−32.5 (−26.5)	−29.6 (−21.3)	−27.5 (−17.5)	−30.0 (−22.0)	−19.0 (−2.2)	−10.3 (13.5)	−6.6 (20.1)	−4.7 (23.5)	−8.2 (17.2)	−16.6 (2.1)	−24.4 (−11.9)	−25.2 (−13.4)	−32.5 (−26.5)
Average precipitation mm (inches)	54.7 (2.15)	51.1 (2.01)	49.1 (1.93)	45.6 (1.80)	56.5 (2.22)	60.6 (2.39)	81.3 (3.20)	89.1 (3.51)	90.2 (3.55)	66.5 (2.62)	75.2 (2.96)	62.0 (2.44)	781.6 (30.77)
Average precipitation days (≥ 0.1 mm)	13.8	12.7	15.1	13.2	13.0	10.5	12.5	12.5	14.1	13.5	14.3	14.4	159.6
Average snowy days	13.6	12.1	14.5	11.4	9.4	2.8	0.1	0.2	4.3	9.8	12.7	13.8	104.7
Average relative humidity (%)	78	79	81	81	84	84	87	87	83	78	76	77	81
Mean monthly sunshine hours	15.5	65.0	148.8	180.0	189.1	204.0	195.3	164.3	141.0	80.6	30.0	6.2	1,419.8
Mean daily sunshine hours	0.5	2.3	4.8	6.0	6.1	6.8	6.3	5.3	4.7	2.6	1.0	0.2	3.9
Source 1: Danish Meteorological Institute
Source 2: Meteo Climat (record highs and lows), Deutscher Wetterdienst (humidity 1961–1990, sun 1980–1990)

=== Climate change ===
The Greenland ice sheet is 3 kilometres (1.9 mi) thick and broad enough to blanket an area the size of Mexico. The ice is so massive that its weight presses the bedrock of Greenland below sea level and is so all-concealing that not until recently did scientists discover Greenland's Grand Canyon or the possibility that Greenland might actually be three islands.

If the ice melted, the interior bedrock below sea level would be covered by water. It is not clear whether this water would be at sea level or a lake above sea level. If it would be at sea level it could connect to the sea at Ilulissat Icefjord, in Baffin Bay and near Nordostrundingen, creating three large islands. But it is most likely that it would be a lake with one drain.

It is thought that before the last Ice Age, Greenland had mountainous edges and a lowland (and probably very dry) center which drained to the sea via one big river flowing out westwards, past where Disko Island is now.

There is concern about sea level rise caused by ice loss (melt and glaciers falling into the sea) on Greenland. Between 1997 and 2003 ice loss was 68–92 km^{3}/a (16–22 cu mi/a), compared to about 60 km^{3}/a (14 cu mi/a) for 1993/4–1998/9. Half of the increase was from higher summer melting, with the rest caused by the movements of some glaciers exceeding the speeds needed to balance upstream snow accumulation. A complete loss of ice on Greenland would cause a sea level rise of as much as 6.40 metres (21.0 ft).

Researchers at NASA's Jet Propulsion Laboratory and the University of Kansas reported in February 2006 that the glaciers are melting twice as fast as they were five years prior. By 2005, Greenland was beginning to lose more ice volume than anyone expected – an annual loss of up to 52 cubic miles or 217 cubic kilometres per year, according to more recent satellite gravity measurements released by JPL. The increased ice loss may be partially offset by increased snow accumulation due to increased precipitation.

Between 1991 and 2006, monitoring of the weather at one location (Swiss Camp) found that the average winter temperature had risen almost 10 °F (5.6 °C).

Recently, Greenland's three largest outlet glaciers have started moving faster, satellite data show. These are the Jacobshavn Isbræ at Ilulissat (Jacobshavn) on the western edge of Greenland, and the Kangerdlugssuaq and Helheim glaciers on the eastern edge of Greenland. The two latter accelerated greatly during the years 2004–2005, but returned to pre-2004 velocities in 2006. The accelerating ice flow has been accompanied by a dramatic increase in seismic activity. In March 2006, researchers at Harvard University and the Lamont–Doherty Earth Observatory at Columbia University reported that the glaciers now generate swarms of earthquakes up to magnitude 5.0.

The retreat of Greenland's ice is revealing islands that were thought to be part of the mainland. In September 2005 Dennis Schmitt discovered an island 400 miles (644 km) north of the Arctic Circle in eastern Greenland which he named Uunartoq Qeqertaq, Inuit for "warming island".

=== Future projections ===
In the Arctic, temperatures are rising faster than anywhere else in the world. Greenland is losing 200 billion tonnes of ice per year. Research suggests that this could increase the sea levels' rise by 30 centimetres (12 in) by the end of the century. These projections have the possibility of changing as satellite data only dates back to 40 years ago. This means that researchers must view old photographs of glaciers and compare them to ones taken today to determine the future of Greenland's ice.

=== Temperature extremes ===
Climate data for Greenland
Month	Jan	Feb	Mar	Apr	May	Jun	Jul	Aug	Sep	Oct	Nov	Dec	Year
Record high °C (°F)	15.3 (59.5)	16.0 (60.8)	16.0 (60.8)	19.1 (66.4)	24.8 (76.6)	30.1 (86.2)	26.3 (79.3)	25.2 (77.4)	24.9 (76.8)	19.3 (66.7)	21.6 (70.9)	15.9 (60.6)	30.1 (86.2)
Record low °C (°F)	−66.1 (−87.0)	−66.1 (−87.0)	−67.2 (−89.0)	−58.0 (−72.4)	−49.0 (−56.2)	−37.5 (−35.5)	−33.0 (−27.4)	−39.2 (−38.6)	−46.0 (−50.8)	−56.0 (−68.8)	−60.0 (−76.0)	−69.6 (−93.3)	−69.6 (−93.3)
Source 1: Weather Extremes Greenland, archived from the original on 9 August 2020 (all record lows except for Jan, Mar, May, Dec)(Jan and Feb record highs), Meteo Climat (Mar–Dec highs)
Source 2: Georgi, Johannes (1935), Eismitte record low, PANGAEA - Data Publisher for Earth & Environmental Science, doi:10.1594/PANGAEA.604003 (March record low), May record low at Summit (May record low), WUnderground (record low all time)

==== Highest temperatures ====
Month	Temperature	Date	Location
January	15.3 °C (59.5 °F)	29 January 2003	Nuuk, Sermersooq
February	16.0 °C (60.8 °F)	20 February 2005	Nanortailak, Kujalleq
March	16.0 °C (60.8 °F)	31 March 1975	Narsarsuaq, Kujalleq
April	19.1 °C (66.4 °F)	26 April 2016	Narsarsuaq, Kujalleq
May	24.8 °C (76.6 °F)	29 May 2012	Narsarsuaq, Kujalleq
June	30.1 °C (86.2 °F)	23 June 1915	Ivittuut, Sermersooq
July	26.3 °C (79.3 °F)	6 July 2008	Nuuk, Sermersooq
August	25.2 °C (77.4 °F)	3 August 1899	Tasillaq, Sermersooq
September	24.9 °C (76.8 °F)	2 September 2010	Nuuk, Sermersooq
October	19.3 °C (66.7 °F)	5 October 2016	Tasillaq, Sermersooq
November	21.6 °C (70.9 °F)	21 November 2015	Tasillaq, Sermersooq
December	15.9 °C (60.6 °F)	21 December 2001	Narsarsuaq, Kujalleq

==== Lowest temperatures ====
Month	Temperature	Date	Location
January	−66.1 °C (−87.0 °F)	9 January 1954	North Ice, Northeast Greenland
February	−66.1 °C (−87.0 °F)	21 February 1950	Eismitte, Northeast Greenland
March	−67.2 °C (−89.0 °F)	18 March 2011	Summit Camp Station, Northeast Greenland
April	−58.0 °C (−72.4 °F)	1931	Eismitte, Northeast Greenland
May	−49.0 °C (−56.2 °F)	9 May 2018	Summit Camp Station, Northeast Greenland
June	−37.5 °C (−35.5 °F)	1 June 2011	Summit Camp Station, Northeast Greenland
July	−33.0 °C (−27.4 °F)	4 July 2017	Summit Camp Station, Northeast Greenland
August	−39.2 °C (−38.6 °F)	29 August 2004	Summit Camp Station, Northeast Greenland
September	−46.0 °C (−50.8 °F)	24 September 2009	Summit Camp Station, Northeast Greenland
October	−56.0 °C (−68.8 °F)	1930	Eismitte, Northeast Greenland
November	−60.0 °C (−76.0 °F)	26 November 2001	Summit Camp Station, Northeast Greenland
December	−69.6 °C (−93.3 °F)	22 December 1991	Klinck Station, Northeast Greenland

== Geology ==
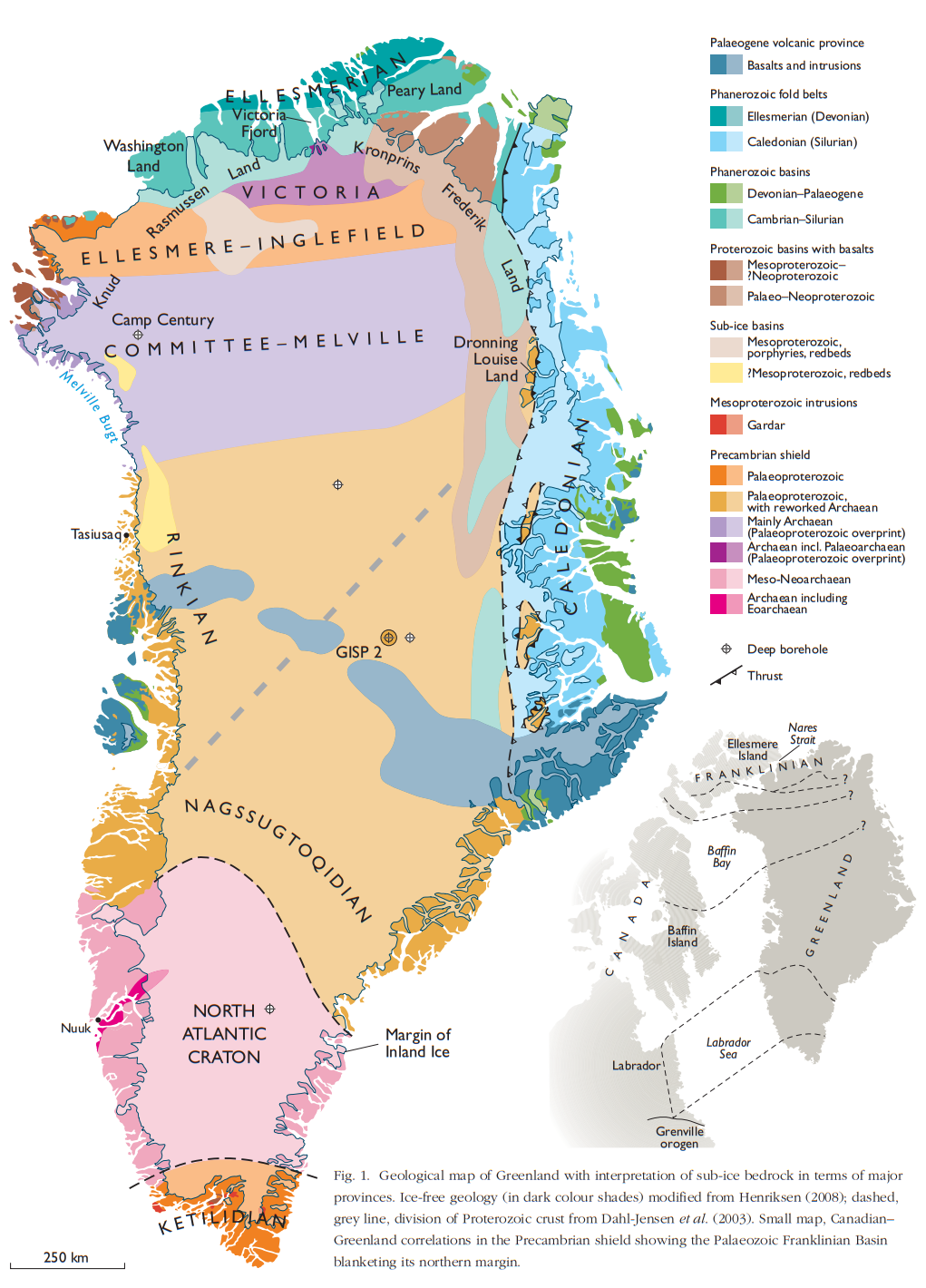
« Geological map of Greenland with interpretation of sub-ice bedrock in terms of major provinces. Ice-free geology (in dark colour shades) modified from Henriksen (2008); dashed, grey line, division of Proterozoic crust from Dahl-Jensen et al. (2003). Small map, Canadian– Greenland correlations in the Precambrian shield showing the Palaeozoic Franklinian Basin blanketing its northern margin ».

== Topography ==
The ice sheet covering Greenland varies significantly in elevation across the landmass, rising dramatically between the coastline at sea level and the East-Central interior, where elevations reach 3,200 metres (10,500 ft). The coastlines are rocky and predominantly barren with fjords. Numerous small islands spread from the Central to Southern coastlines.

Greenland's mountain ranges are partially or completely buried by ice. The highest mountains are in the Watkins Range, which runs along the eastern coast. Greenland's highest mountain is Gunnbjorn Fjeld with a height of 3,700 metres (12,139 ft).

Scientists discovered an asteroid impact crater in the northwestern region of Greenland, buried underneath the ice sheet. At a size larger than Washington, D.C., it is the first impact crater found beneath one of Earth's ice sheets.

== Extreme points ==
This is a list of the extreme points of Greenland, the points that are farther north, south, east or west than any other location.

=== Territory of Greenland ===
- Northernmost point — Kaffeklubben Island (83°40'N) – the northernmost permanent land in the world. There are also some shifting gravel bars that lie north of Kaffeklubben, the most northerly ever found being 83-42.
- Southernmost point — unnamed islet 2.3 km south of Cape Farewell, Egger Island (59°44'N)
- Westernmost point — Nordvestø, Carey Islands (73°10'W)
- Easternmost point — Nordostrundingen, Greenland (11°19'W)
- Highest point — Gunnbjørn Fjeld, 3,694 metres (12,119 ft)

=== Mainland Greenland ===
- Northernmost point — Cape Morris Jesup (83°39'N)
- Southernmost point — Peninsula near Tasiusaq, Kujalleq (59°58'26.4"N)
- Westernmost point — Cape Alexander (73°08'W)
- Easternmost point — Nordostrundingen, Greenland (11°19'W)
- Highest point — Gunnbjørn Fjeld, 3,694 metres (12,119 ft).

== Towns ==
Greenland has 17 towns – settlements with more than 500 inhabitants. Nuuk is the largest town – and the capital – with roughly one third of the country's urban population. Sisimiut with approximately 5,500 inhabitants is the second largest town, while Ilulissat is number three with around 5,000 inhabitants.

- Aasiaat (Egedesminde)
- Ilulissat (Jacobshavn)
- Ittoqqortoormiit (Scoresbysund)
- Kangaatsiaq
- Maniitsoq (Sukkertoppen)
- Nanortalik (Bjørnsted)
- Narsaq (Sletten)
- Nuuk (Godthåb)
- Paamiut (Frederikshåb)
- Qaanaaq (Thule)
- Qaqortoq (Julianehåb)
- Qasigiannguit (Christianshåb)
- Qeqertarsuaq (Godhavn)
- Sisimiut (Holstensborg)
- Tasiilaq (Oscarshavn)
- Upernavik
- Uummannaq

== Gallery ==
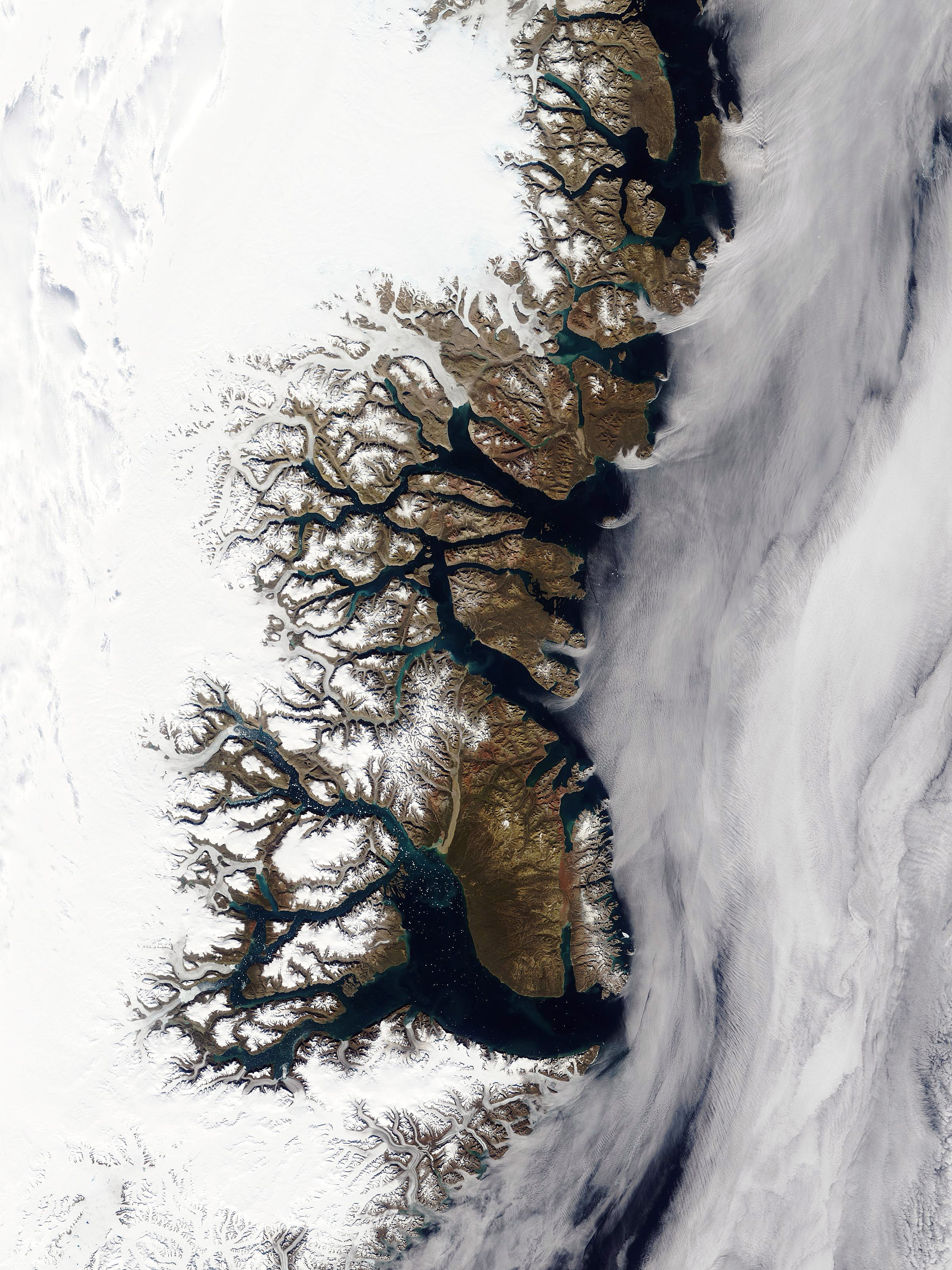
The fractal coastline of eastern Greenland, with its many fjords

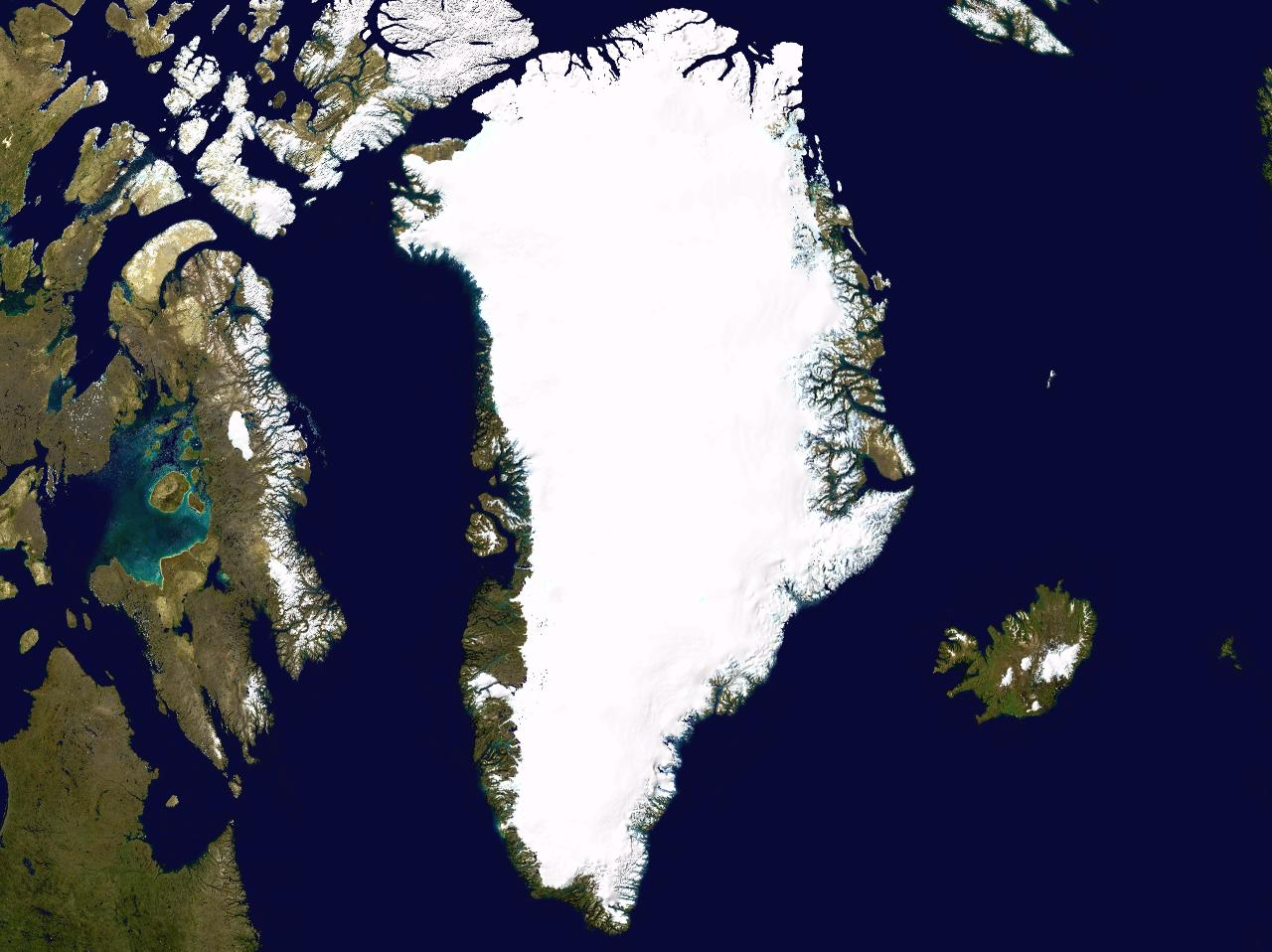
An enlargeable satellite composite image of Greenland

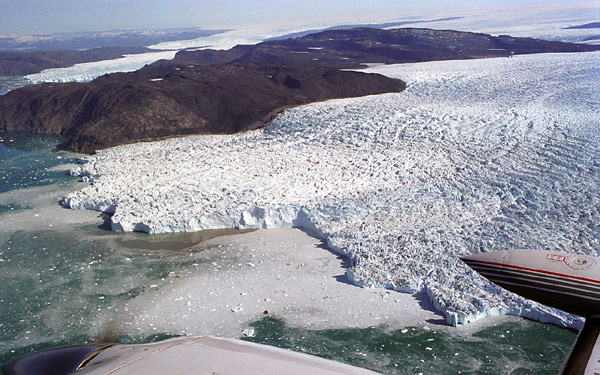
Sermeq Kujatdlek Glacier on Greenland's west coast

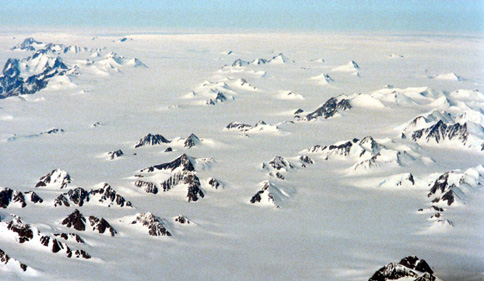
Nunataks on Greenland's east coast

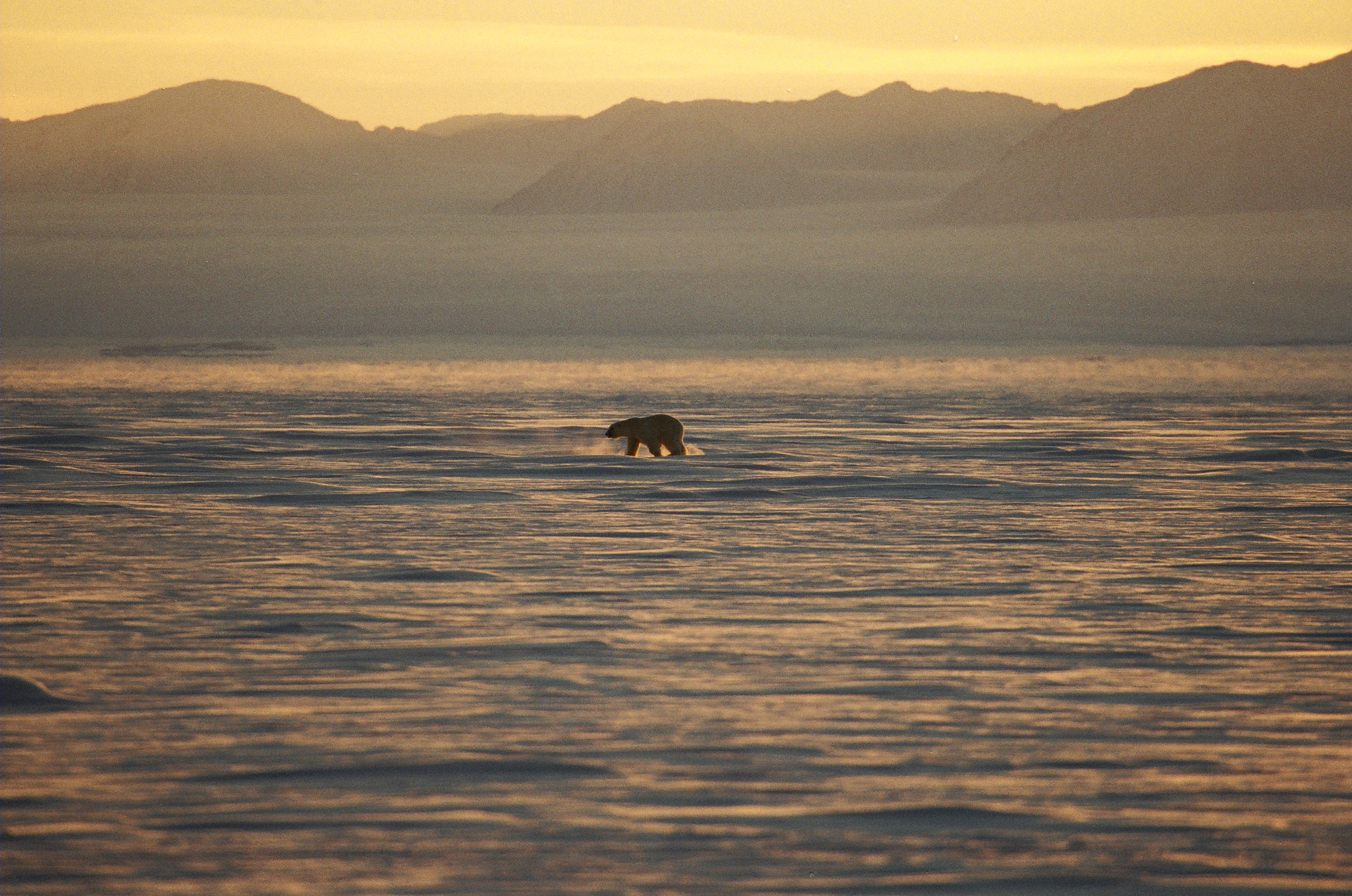
A polar bear on Greenland's eastern coast

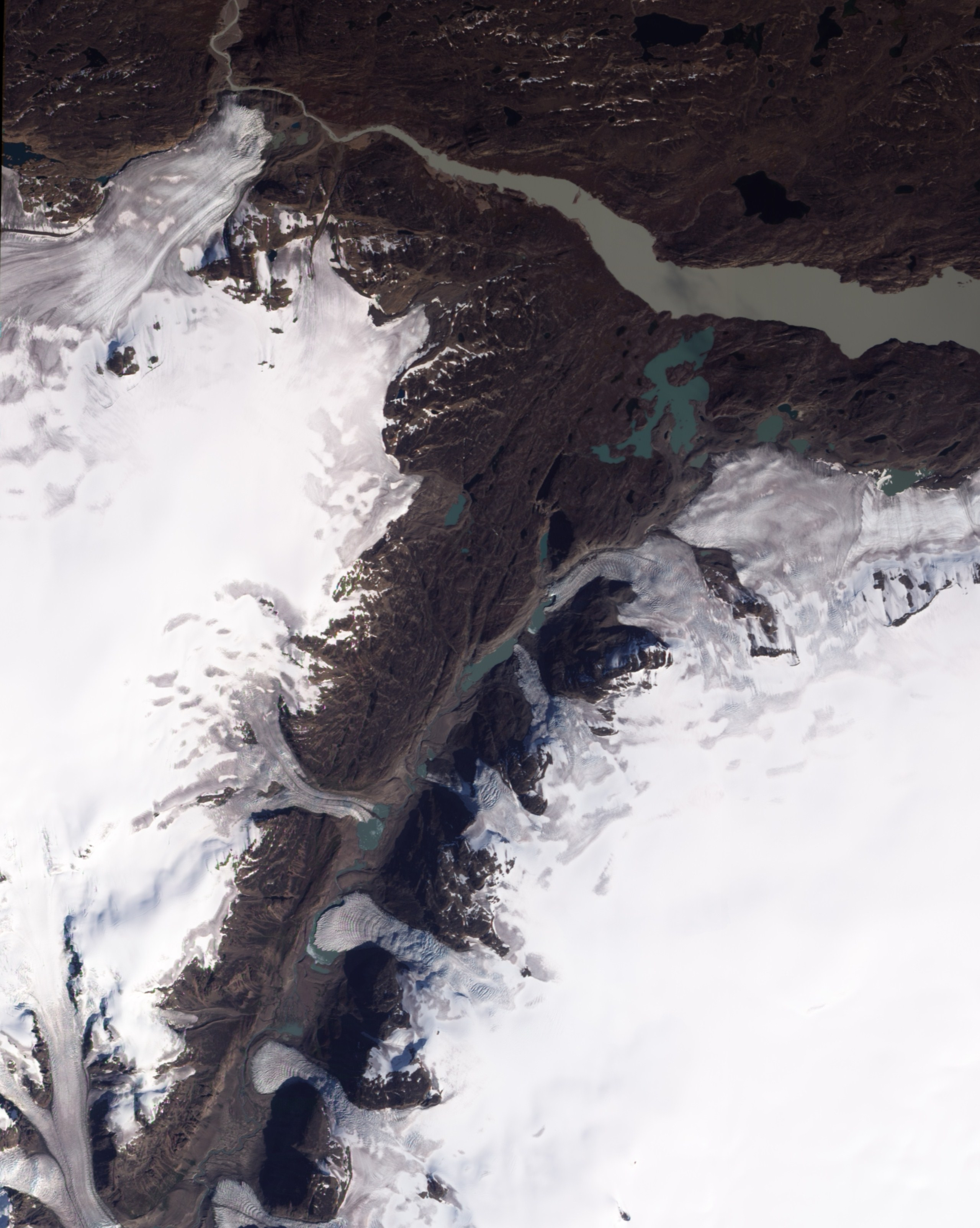
Small glaciers spilling into a mostly dry valley in western Greenland

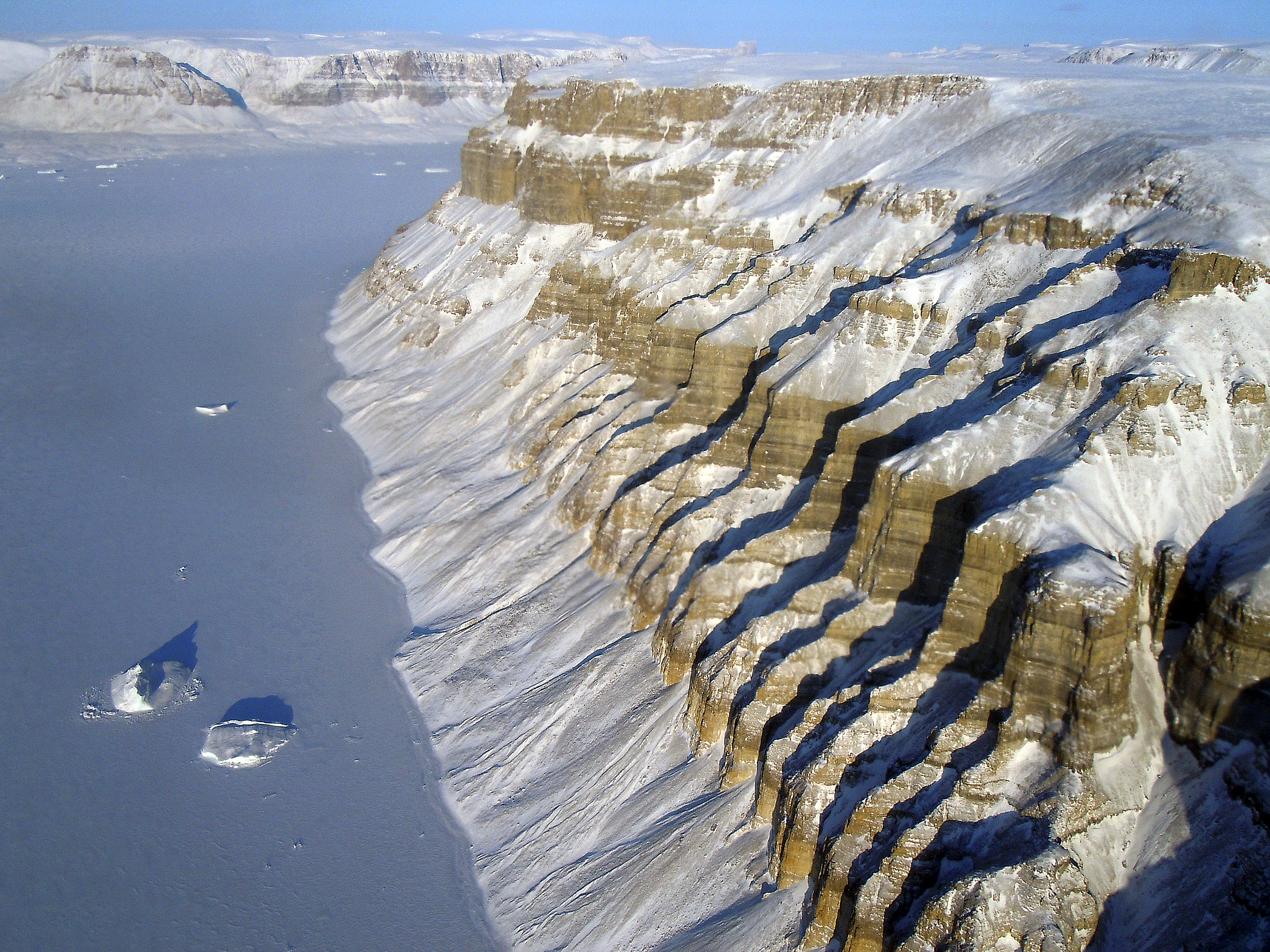
View of deep canyons, or fjords, along the coast of northwestern Greenland

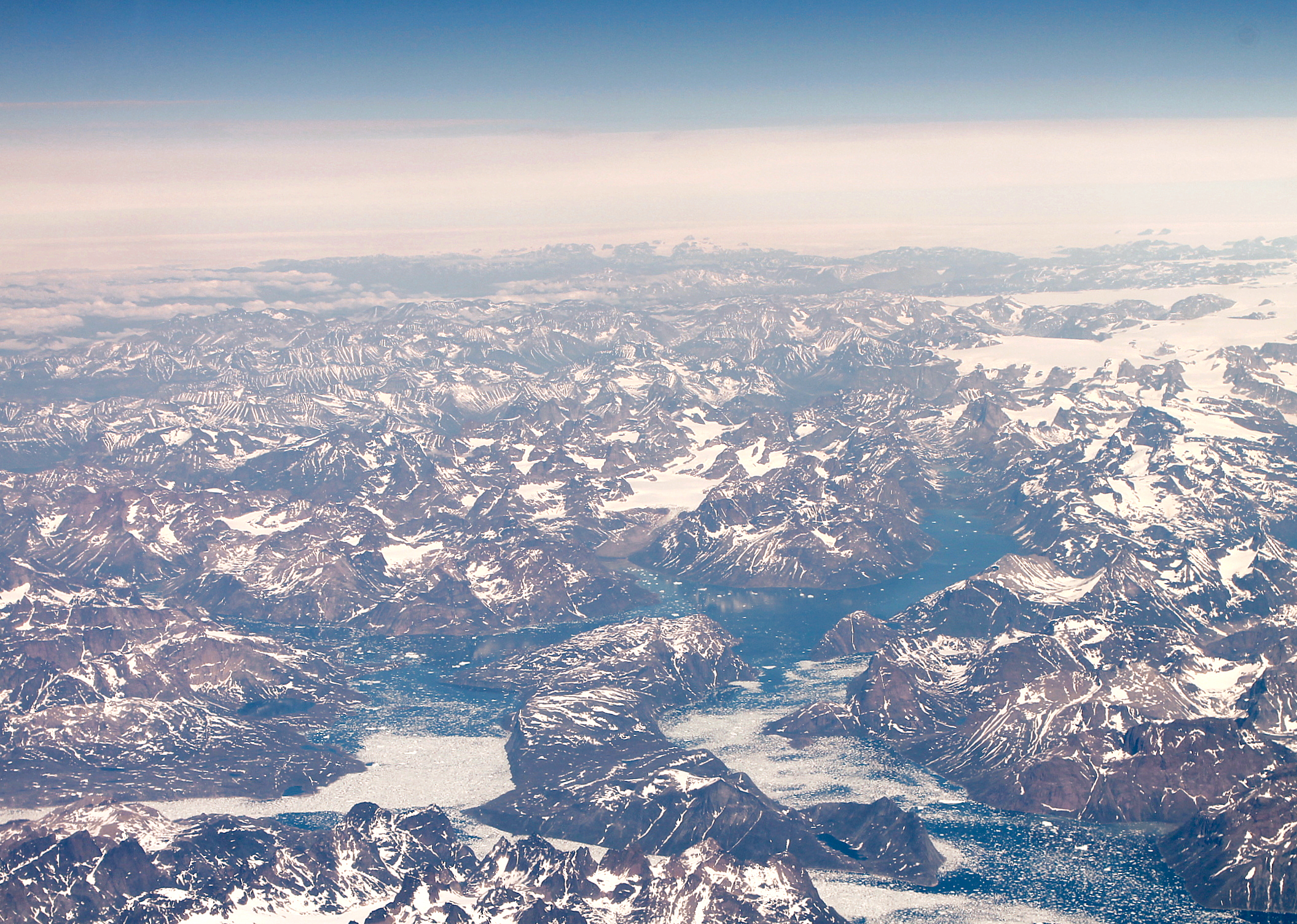
Mountains in southern Greenland, as seen from an altitude of approximately 34,000 feet

Greenland geography map

== See also ==
- List of mountain peaks of Greenland
- List of mountain ranges of Greenland
- Greenland's Grand Canyon
- Climate change adaptation in Greenland
