= Climate change in Greenland =

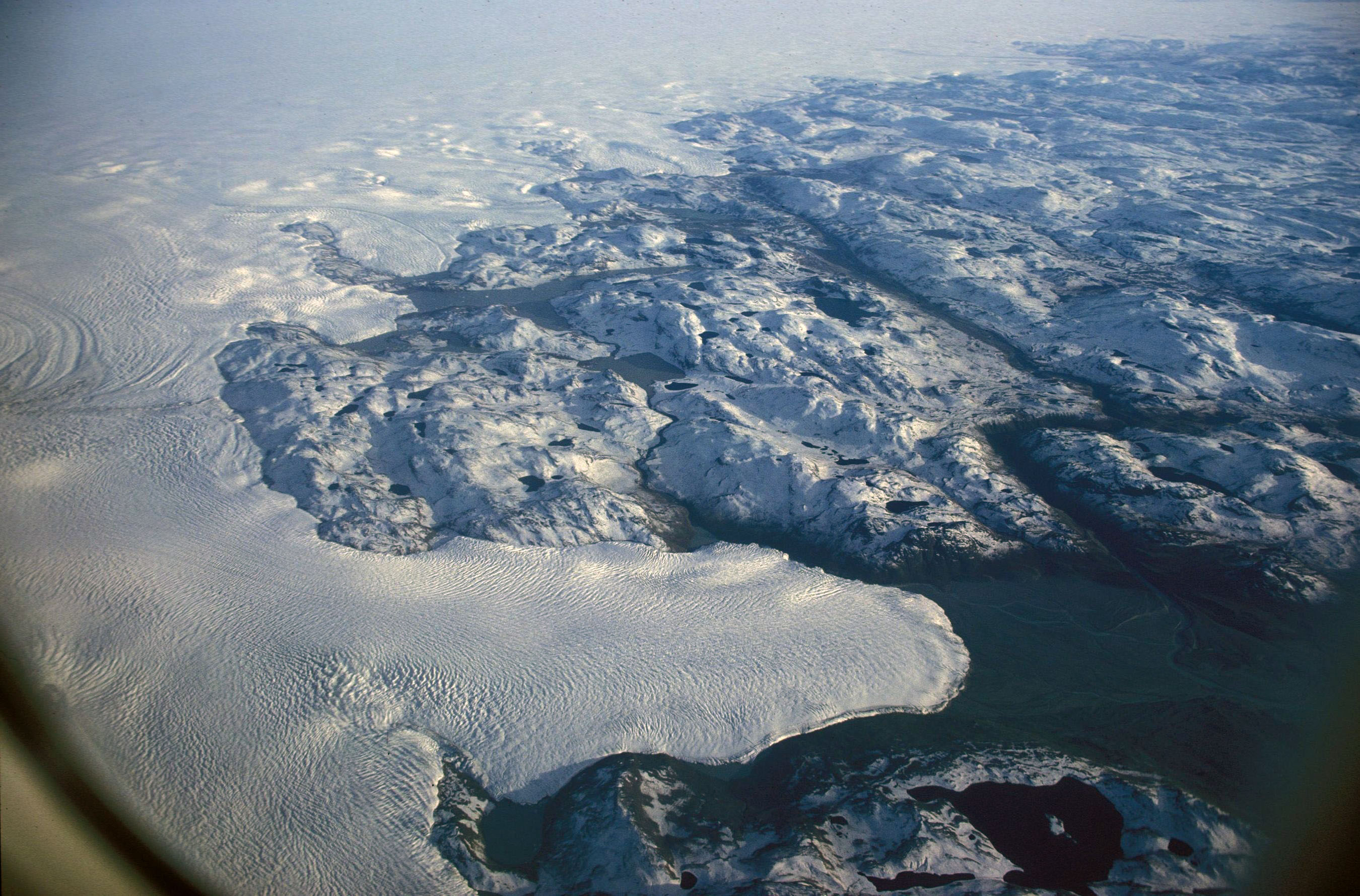
Greenland Ice Sheet

Climate change in Greenland is affecting the livelihood of the Greenlandic population. Geographically Greenland is situated between the Arctic and the Atlantic Ocean, with two thirds of the island being north of the Arctic Circle. Since the middle of the 20th century, the Arctic has been warming at about twice the global rate. Rising temperatures put increasing pressure on certain plant and tree species and contribute to Greenland's melting ice sheet. This affects and changes the livelihood of the Greenlandic population, particularly the Greenlandic Inuit, which make up to 80 percent of the total population. Besides the decline of fish stocks, the country's landscape is changing: the melting ice reveals minerals, oil and gas. This has attracted interest from local and foreign investors for potential resource extraction. As new industries are accompanied by new job opportunities and potential wealth, lifestyles are changing. Greenland is in transition, in terms of biophysical as well as cultural and social conditions.

== Impacts on the natural environment ==
=== Temperature and weather changes ===
Köppen climate classification map for Greenland for 1980–2016

2071–2100 map under the now impossible RCP 8.5 climate change scenario. Mid-range scenarios are currently considered more likely

Since the middle of the 20th century, the Arctic has been warming at about twice the global rate. Rising temperatures put increasing pressure on certain plant and tree species and contribute to Greenland's melting ice sheet.

=== Sea level rise ===
Due to its geographical location and global climatic patterns such as the North Atlantic Oscillation and volcanic activity, Greenland is exposed to high levels of fluctuations in the natural environment. The Greenland ice sheet is the second largest in the world. Consequently, its melting has a significant impact on a global scale. According to the European Environmental Agency "the cumulative ice loss from Greenland from 1992 to 2015 was 3 600 Gt (Gigatonnes) and contributed to global sea level rise by approximately 10 mm." The mass loss of Greenland over 2009-2018 was likely more than seven times higher than over 1992-2001. The anticipated warming of the oceans and resulting sea level rise result in coastal erosion, melting of permafrost and decreased sea ice thickness. The areas impacted most in Greenland are those with the highest population density.

== Impacts on people ==
=== Economic impacts ===
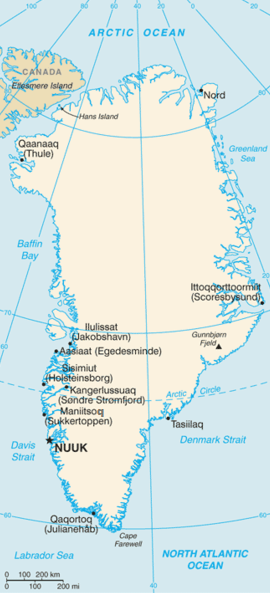
Map of Greenland

In July 2017, Greenland's population was 57,713. This number is expected to decline to 54,800 by 2030. Historically, the movement of people and the accompanying change of social conditions is nothing unusual for Greenlanders. Recorded shifts were primarily driven by the search for resources (of e.g. seals and cod). At the beginning of the 21st century, climate change has an unprecedented impact on Greenland. The melting ice sheet enables an easier access to oil, gas and minerals, the exploitation of which creates new economic opportunities. This prospect of new jobs, purchasing power, new shipping routes and the possibly resulting entrance into the global market system is linked to the potential of gaining greater independence from Denmark. Putting a damper on previously displayed optimism, the versatility of global commodity markets also poses potential threats.

Besides potential for tourism development which comes with numerous challenges, in south Greenland the melting ice provides more grazing opportunities for farmers. However, there is also apprehension particularly amongst smaller villages that rely on hunting and fishing (primarily Inuit communities), that climate change will contribute to the end of their traditional lifestyles.

==== Extraction industry ====
Although becoming increasingly autonomous, Greenland remains dependent on the Kingdom of Denmark since its colonisation in 1721. In 1979, the Home Rule Government was established in Greenland. It gained further rights in 2009, which moved Greenland towards self-rule. The government is financially dependent on Denmark which provides 60% of Greenland's annual budget revenue. One of the country's greatest challenges is to ensure modern life styles introduced primarily through the industrialisation processes and triggered by intensive fishery while pursuing economic wealth creation and further independence. It is for this reason or rather the desire to phase out Denmark's financial support entirely that the Home Rule Government strongly supports and even promotes arising opportunities in the extraction industry. The United States Geological Survey estimated a total of 141 billion barrels of hydrocarbons (approximately 13% of the world's undiscovered oil and 30% of the undiscovered natural gas) to be held beneath Greenlandic surfaces. In 2009, the Greenlandic Government published a lifecycle assessment for the production of aluminium in an Alcoa smelter. The construction of the aluminium smelter is planned in the town of Maniitsoq. In addition, in 2013 the government decided to lift the ban on the extraction of radioactive minerals such as uranium.

=== Impacts on indigenous people ===
Because of climate change, the Tunumiit Inuit, who reside in east Greenland, are seeing changes to their food systems and cultural interpretations as well. There has been a general change from seal hunting to fishing. Unlike seal hunting, fishing is deemed as a low-status activity to the Tunumiit. Before recent years, the Tunumiit would equate lack of ecological resources to a paucity of collective human respect. This cultural tradition no longer carries the same weight because the Tunumiit believe they are losing agency in controlling the unpredictable weather. Many traditional hunters are shifting towards the tourism sector because they can no longer provide for their families through traditional forms of hunting. Catering to tourists has modified their culture, relationship with food, and increased global carbon dioxide emissions by encouraging more travel to east Greenland.

==== Traditional ecological knowledge ====
Widely discussed in academic literature since the 1980s, traditional ecological knowledge cumulatively consists of knowledge, practices and beliefs about the interaction of living beings and their environment. In Greenland, traditional knowledge does not only underpin the life of subsistence hunters and fishermen but also more broadly community life and culture. While climate change is making practical aspects such as the prediction of weather or animal migration more difficult, it also highlights the importance of traditional knowledge for adaptive capacity building in other areas e.g. the recognition of approaching hazards and survival skills. The process of knowledge transfer between generations for building resilience is also important to address as it is weakened by trends of urbanisation and alternative livelihoods. Such trends can further lead to the alienation of people from their environment. This increases the need for the management of ecosystems which are the base of Greenland's economic activities, cultural characteristics and natural services.

==== The concept of anticipation ====
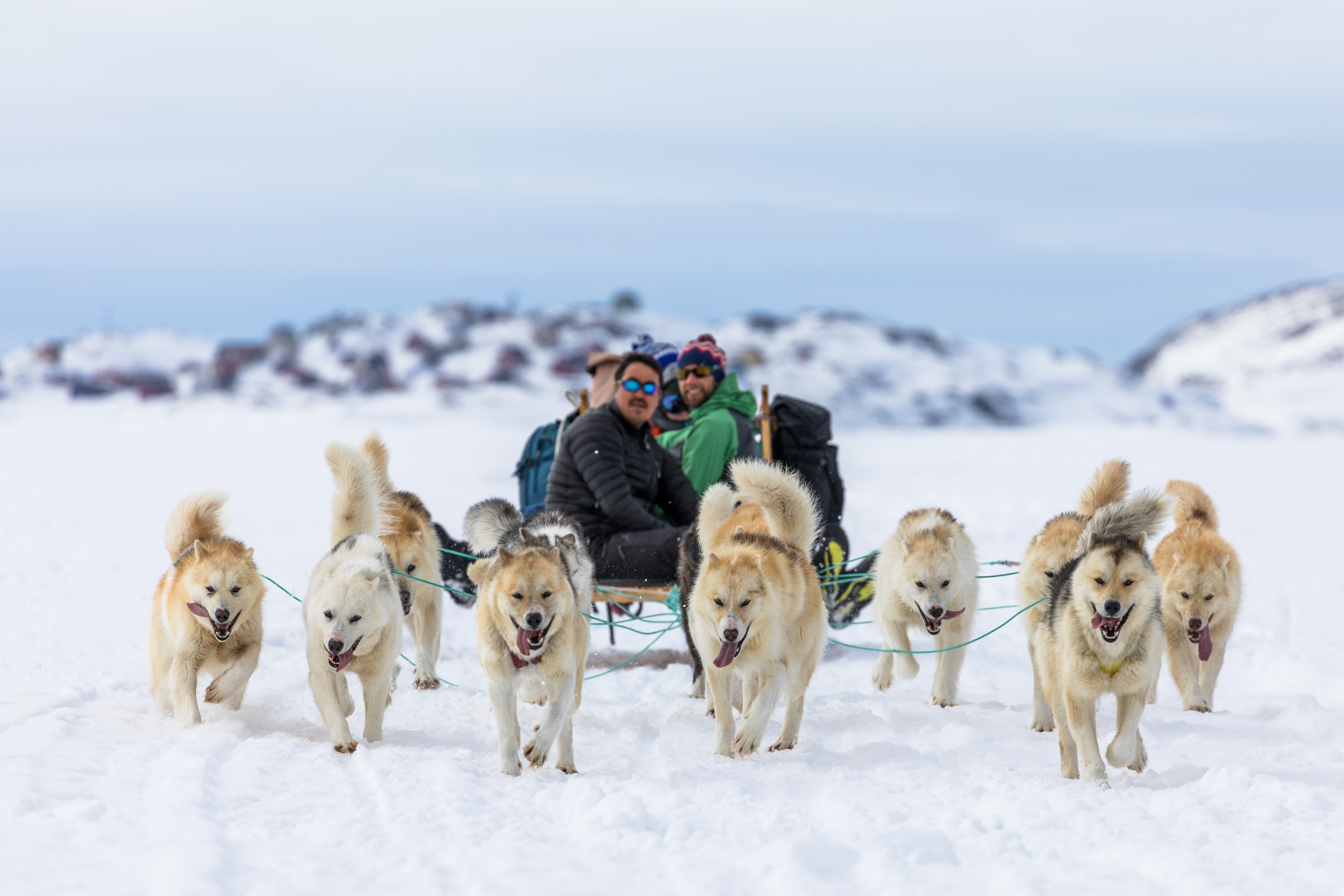
Inuit hunters near Kulusuk, Greenland

Greenlandic Inuit as a societal group are academically recognised for their "finely tuned ability to be flexible, to innovate, and to seize opportunities in the environment." This means that a successful adaptation to changing climatic conditions is attributed to a specific ontology which includes the ability to relate to one's world, making sense of it and reflecting on expectations about it; anticipation. In Greenlandic the term 'anticipation' is divided into two meanings which are primarily used by subsistence hunters and fishermen: neriguaa ("to hope for, or to be hopeful of something") and aarleraa ("to be fearful, especially of bad weather"). This distinction of meanings carries the acceptance of uncertainty as well as potential disappointments and failure.

== Mitigation and adaptation ==
=== Adaptation ===
Since the 1950s a stark rise in global temperatures has been observed. As climate change, whether natural or anthropogenic, impacts the livelihoods of people across the globe, responses i.e. ways to prepare and adjust under changing vulnerabilities become important. Such responses are commonly discussed under the term adaptation, "the process of adjustment to actual or expected climate and its effects", as defined by the IPCC.

In order to identify and implement effective measures of adaptation, current developments, such as demographic change and other non-climatic factors of change must be considered simultaneously. A study conducted by the AMAP, a working group of the Arctic Council, distinguishes between short-term and long-term adaptation measures, as well as climate-centered and vulnerability-centered options. In the short-term, adaptation measures can focus on immediate challenges caused by increased extreme weather events, such as heavy rainfalls or melting permafrost (climate-centered). In the long-term, other developments, such as the effects of demographic, social and economic change must be considered when determining how climate change will affect the population (vulnerability-centered).

==== Greenlandic Government ====
At the 2015 United Nations Climate Change Conference, the then Greenlandic Minister for Finance, Mineral Resources and Foreign Affairs, Vittus Qujaukitsoq described climate change adaptation in Greenland as being a policy priority. He underlined the importance of incorporating the knowledge and experience of the Inuit to gain an all-encompassing understanding of the ongoing climatic changes.

The government's website Climate Greenland is both a resource tool to find relevant organizations or stakeholders, as well as information on the impacts of climate change on Greenland and how the country is responding to it. It focuses on the four areas 'citizen', 'trade', 'municipality' and 'education'. Climate Change Adaptation is defined as "being prepared for the challenges caused by the climate changes and about relating to possibilities as well as challenges." The Government publishes adaptation reports for sectors, such as fisheries, hunting or tourism. The website is no longer accessible as of April 2025, with the last archive being from January 16th, 2023.

In 2009 the Greenland Climate Research Centre was set up in the capital of Greenland, Nuuk. The centre received a grant of DKK 35 million by the Danish Ministry of Science, Technology and Innovation. The aim of the centre is to study the impact of climate change on Greenland and the Arctic and the consequences for nature and society. It is linked to the Greenland Institute of Natural Resources and the University of Greenland, Ilisimatusarfik. Traditional knowledge is important for weather and animal migration, as well as for adaptive capacity building in areas such as the recognition of approaching hazards and survival skills.

==== Arctic Council ====
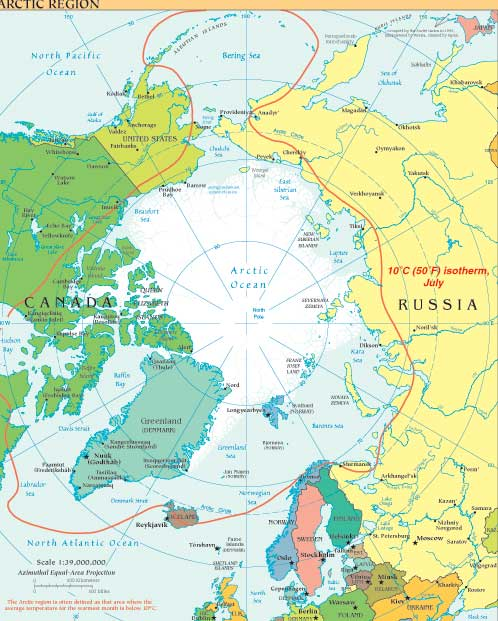
Countries within the Arctic Region

In 2008, following increased media attention for the Arctic, the five countries adjacent to the Arctic Ocean (Canada, Denmark (Greenland), Norway, Russia and the United States) published the Ilulissat Declaration. This proclaims the Arctic states' responsibility to protect the ecosystem of the Arctic Ocean. In addition, the Council's Arctic Monitoring and Assessment Programme (AMAP) has published a series of reports one of which looks at adaptation in particular. The 2017 Adaptation Actions for a Changing Arctic (AACA) Report covers the Baffin Bay/Davis Strait region which includes the western part of Greenland aiming to offer information "to assist local decision makers and stakeholders [...] in developing adaptation tools and strategies to better deal with climate change [...]." Following extensive stakeholder dialogues, the report identified seven themes of local adaptation:

1. Living resources
2. Non-living resources (e.g. mineral extraction)
3. Education
4. Human health and well-being
5. Tourism
6. Shipping
7. Infrastructure

The report concludes that it is crucial to consider the cumulative and cascading effects of change in order to build adaptive capacities. Suggested measures are structural/physical, social as well as institutional. Lastly, as a precursor to adaptation measures, the AACA points out six factors (political leadership, institutional organisation, local and regional leadership, the need for usable science and sufficient funding and public support) to build adaptive readiness.

== See also ==
- Geography of Greenland
- Climate change in the Arctic
