= Payer Peak =

Mountain in Greenland

- Payer Tinde, Payers Fjeld
- Location within Greenland

Highest point
- Elevation: 1,979 m (6,493 ft)
- Listing: North America prominent peaks; North America most isolated peaks; North America Ultra prominent peak; Greenland Ultra prominent peak
- Coordinates: 73°8′44″N 26°23′25″W

Geography
- Location: Suess Land, NE Greenland

Climbing
- First ascent: 1870

Payer Peak, (Danish: Payer Tinde or Payers Fjeld) is a mountain in King Christian X Land, Northeast Greenland. Administratively it is part of the Northeast Greenland National Park zone.

The region around Payer Peak is uninhabited. This mountain is located in the high Arctic zone, where Polar climate prevails. The average annual temperature in the area is −17 °C. The warmest month is June when the average temperature rises to −2 °C and the coldest is November with −23 °C.

== Geography ==
Payer Peak rises on the northern side of Suess Land in the inner Kaiser Franz Joseph Fjord only 4 km from the shore of the fjord. It is located south of Cape Payer, a headland in the fjord's southern coast.

Together with Petermann Peak this mountain was long believed to be one of the highest summits in northeastern Greenland, but its actual height does not reach 2,000 metres (6,562 ft). It is marked as a 7,692-foot-high (2,345 m) peak in the Defense Mapping Agency Greenland Navigation charts and as a 2,320-metre-high (7,612 ft) mountain in other sources.

=== Historical background ===
Payer Peak was named Payer Spitze by Carl Koldewey during the Second German North Polar Expedition he led while first surveying and partially exploring Kaiser Franz Joseph Fjord in 1869–70. The peak was named after Austro-Hungarian arctic explorer Julius von Payer (1842–1915) who was co-leader of the expedition. In August 1870 Julius Payer, Ralph Copeland and Peter Ellinger climbed to the ice plateau NE of Payer Peak via the Solklar Glacier and from here were able to view of inner Kaiser Franz Joseph Fjord and Petermann Peak.

Although much publicity was given to the 1870 ascent of Payer Peak in 1870 as a landmark in Arctic mountaineering, John Haller and Wolfgang Diehl, who climbed Payer Tinde in 1952 found no evidence of a previous ascent.

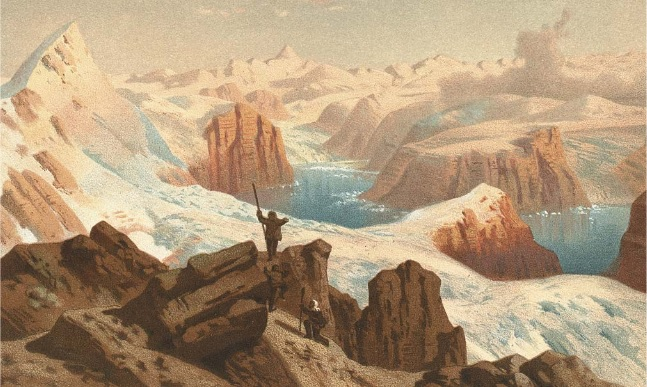
Representation of the 12 August 1870 discovery of Petermann Peak by Julius Payer, Ralph Copeland and Peter Ellinger after climbing onto Payer Peak.

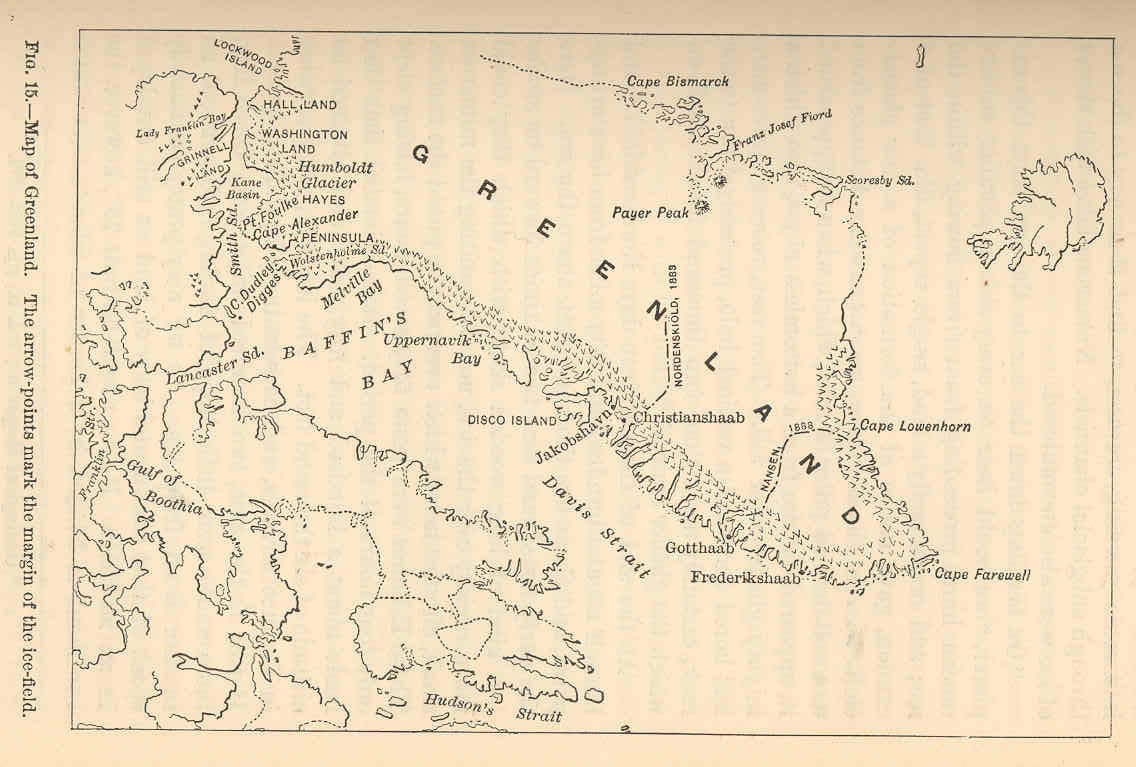
Payer Peak in a map of Greenland by George Frederick Wright (1838–1921).

== See also ==
- List of mountain peaks of Greenland
- List of mountains in Greenland
- List of the ultra-prominent summits of North America
- List of the major 100-kilometer summits of North America
