= Azimuthbjerg =

Highest mountain in Skjoldungen, Greenland

- Miialeqaaq
- Location within Greenland

Highest point
- Elevation: 1,738 m (5,702 ft)
- Prominence: 1,738 m (5,702 ft)
- Listing: North America prominent peaks; North America isolated peaks; North America Ultra prominent peak; Greenland Ultra prominent peak
- Coordinates: 63°27′21″N 41°50′58″W

Geography
- Location: Sermersooq, Greenland

Azimuthbjerg (Greenlandic: Miialeqaaq) is the highest mountain in Skjoldungen Island, SE Greenland.

== Geography ==
This multi-peaked mountain rises steeply from the shore of the northern end of the Southern Skjoldungen Fjord (Greenlandic: Iittuarmiit), at the NW corner of Skjoldungen Island in the Sermersooq municipality. It is a 1,738-metre-high (5,702 ft) ultra-prominent peak. This mountain is marked as a 5,266-foot-high (1,605 m) peak in the Defense Mapping Agency Greenland Navigation charts.

== See also ==
- List of mountain peaks of Greenland
- List of mountains of Greenland
- List of the ultra-prominent summits of North America
- List of the major 100-kilometer summits of North America
