= Pyramiden (Greenland) =

Mountain in Greenland

- Location within Greenland

Highest point
- Elevation: 1,410 m (4,630 ft)
- Coordinates: 61°38′51″N 43°1′3″W

Geography
- Location: Kujalleq, Greenland

Pyramiden is a mountain in King Frederick VI Coast, Kujalleq municipality, southern Greenland.

== Geography ==
This mountain is a 1,410 m high largely unglaciated rocky pyramidal peak rising from a nunatak located above the glacier that joins the confluence at the head of Anorituup Kangerlua fjord from the east.

== See also ==
- List of mountains in Greenland
- List of nunataks of Greenland
