= Klosterbjerge =

Mountain range in East Greenland

- Location within Greenland

Highest point
- Elevation: 2,410 m (7,910 ft)
- Listing: North America Ultra prominent peak; Greenland Ultra prominent peak

Geography
- Location: Northeast Greenland National Park
- Country: Greenland
- Range coordinates: 72°15′00″N 25°54′30″W

The Klosterbjerge are a mountain range in East Greenland. It is located in Nathorst Land, at the southern end of the Northeast Greenland National Park.

== Highest point ==
The 2,410 m (7,910 ft) highest peak of the range is one of the ultra-prominent summits of Greenland. It was first ascended in 1977 by a German expedition led by Karl Maria Herrligkoffer. The peak rises 69 km (43 mi) west of Mestersvig Airfield.

== See also ==
- List of mountain ranges of Greenland
