= Hillingar effect =

The hillingar effect or Arctic mirage is a mirage that occurs when cold air near the surface causes light rays to bend.

Light passing from an object through air to an observer always refracts, or bends, in the direction of increasing air density. Especially over cold ocean areas but also over snowfields or glaciers, air density can change with altitude so rapidly that the horizon appears to lift up like the edges of a saucer. Coastlines normally well below the horizon are raised up into view. Early Norsemen called these mirages hillingars.
