= Haffner Bjerg =

Mountain in Greenland

- Mount Haffner
- Location within Greenland

Highest point
- Elevation: 979 m (3,212 ft)
- Prominence: 392 m (1,286 ft)
- Coordinates: 76°20′37″N 62°20′46″W

Geography
- Location: Avannaata, Greenland

Mount Haffner (or Haffner Bjerg) is a 979-metre (3,212 ft) high mountain in north-west Greenland. It is located on the Hayes Peninsula.
