= Gunnbjørn Fjeld =

Tallest mountain in Greenland

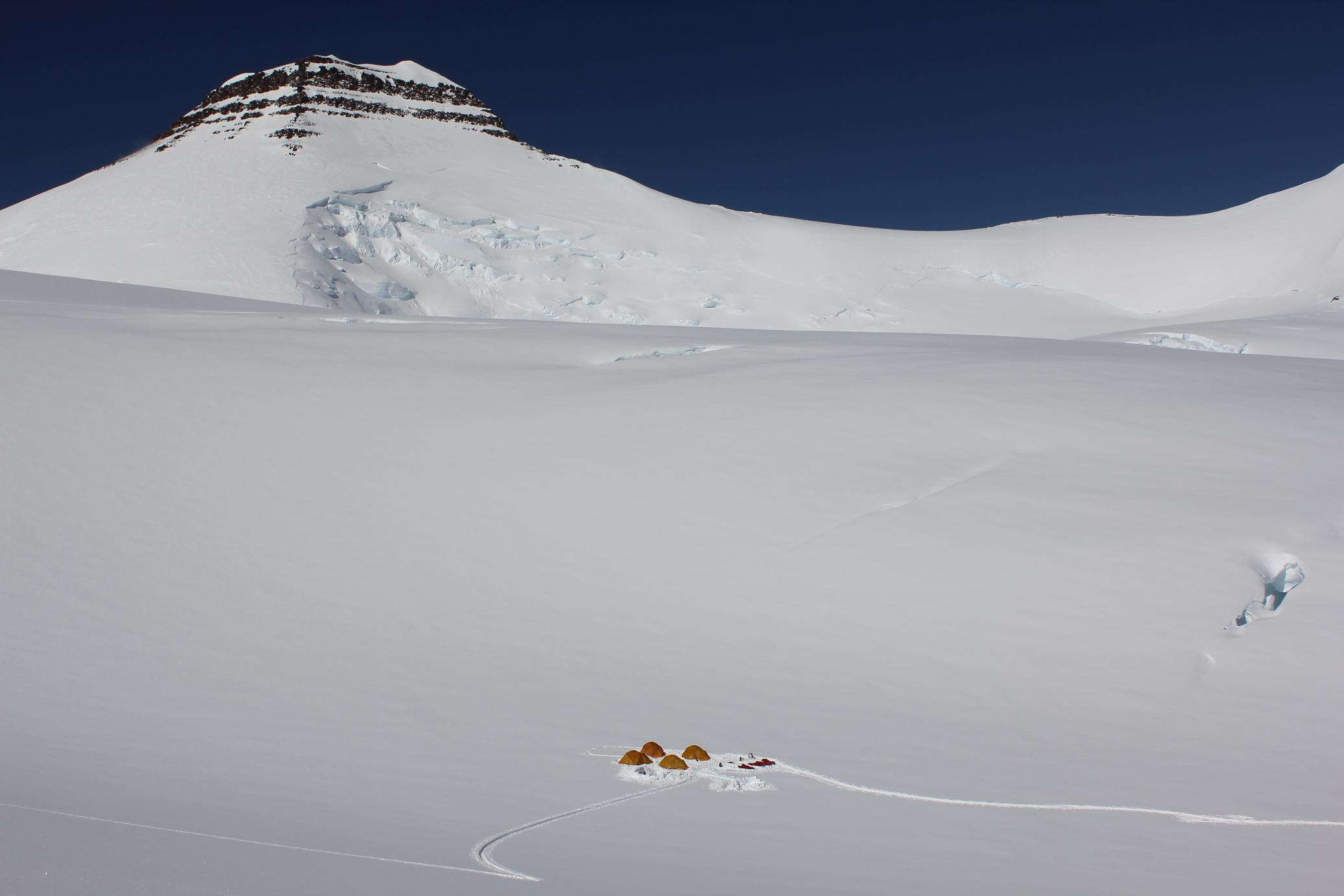

Highest point
- Elevation: 3,694 m (12,119 ft)
- Prominence: 3,694 m (12,119 ft)
- Isolation: 3,254 km (2,022 mi)
- Listing: Island high point 11th; World most prominent peaks 43rd; World most isolated peaks 9th; Country high point; Ultra prominent peak; Greenland highest peaks 1st
- Coordinates: 68°55′10.2″N 29°53′54.72″W

Geography
- Location within Greenland
- Location: Sermersooq, Greenland
- Parent range: Watkins Range

Climbing
- First ascent: 16 August 1935

Gunnbjørn Fjeld is the highest mountain in Greenland, north of the Arctic Circle, and the highest point in North America not on the mainland. It is situated in the east of the territory. It is a nunatak, a rocky peak protruding through glacial ice. Gunnbjørn Fjeld is ranked 9th by topographic isolation.

== Geography ==
Gunnbjørn Fjeld is located in the Watkins Range, an area of nunataks on the east coast, which contains several other summits above 3,500 metres. Its height is often given as 3,700 metres (12,139 ft), although figures vary slightly.

This is higher than Snæfellsjökull, 530.2 kilometers away on the west coast of Snæfellsnes on Iceland.

Normal straight light rays do not allow one to simultaneously see Gunnbjørn Fjeld and Snæfellsjökull. However, arctic mirages allow seeing long distances by refracting (bending) the light. This effect is caused by a thermal density gradient in the atmosphere. It has been suggested that mutual visibility may exist under hillingar effect or Arctic mirage conditions.

== History ==
Gunnbjørn Fjeld was first climbed on 16 August 1935 by Augustine Courtauld, Jack Longland, Ebbe Munck and Lawrence Wager. It is named after Gunnbjörn Ulfsson, the first European to have sighted Greenland.

The peak rises in an uninhabited part of the eastern coast of Greenland. The mountain is climbed infrequently due to its remote location. Access is often done with helicopter or ski-equipped plane (normally from Iceland).

== See also ==
- Mont Forel, formerly assumed to be the highest point of Greenland
- List of mountain peaks of Greenland
- List of mountains in Greenland
