= Favre Bjerg =

Mountain in eastern Greenland

- Location within Greenland

Highest point
- Elevation: 1,900 m (6,200 ft)
- Coordinates: 73°56.3′N 23°17.7′W

Geography
- Location: Hudson Land, Greenland

Favre Bjerg (Danish: Favres Bjerg) is a mountain in eastern Greenland. Administratively it is part of the Northeast Greenland National Park.

This peak was named at the time of Lauge Koch’s 1936–38 expedition after Swiss geologist Jean Alphonse Favre (1815–1890). The name was chosen by Heinrich Bütler (1893–1983), another Swiss geologist who worked for many years with Lauge Koch in his East Greenland expeditions.

== Geography ==
Favre Bjerg is a roughly 1,900 m (6,200 ft) high peak that rises in the northern part of central Hudson Land, west of the Stordalen valley and the Norlund Alps. It is the highest point of Hudson Land. This mountain is marked as a 6,544-foot-high (1,995 m) peak in the Defense Mapping Agency Greenland Navigation charts.

Map of Northeastern Greenland

== See also ==
- List of mountains in Greenland
