= Hjelm Range =

Mountain range in Greenland

- Hjelmbjergene
- Map of Northeastern Greenland.

Highest point
- Peak: Harder Bjerg
- Elevation: 1,627 m (5,338 ft)

Dimensions
- Length: 32 km (20 mi) NW/SE
- Width: 17 km (11 mi) NE/SW

Geography
- Location within Greenland
- Country: Greenland
- Range coordinates: 73°25′N 23°5′W

The Hjelm Range (Danish: Hjelmbjergene) is a mountain range in the Gauss Peninsula, King Christian X Land, northeastern Greenland. Administratively this range is part of the Northeast Greenland National Park zone.

The range was named by the 1931 - 1934 Three-year Expedition to East Greenland following a suggestion by expedition member Thyge Johansen, who said that the rounded mountaintops reminded him of the helmets worn by Roman soldiers.

== Geography ==
The Hjelm Range is a mountain chain located in the southern part of the Gauss Peninsula stretching roughly from NW to SE along the coast of the Kaiser Franz Joseph Fjord. Its northern limit is the Paralleldal and the highest point of the range is 1,627 m (5,338 ft) high Harder Bjerg (Hardersbjerg) The Vestre Plateau and the Margrethedal mark the eastern limit of the range. The area of the Hjelm mountains is uninhabited.

=== Mountains ===
- Bøggild Bjerg
- Gunnbjörnfjellet
- Harder Bjerg
- Langbjerg
- Smith Woodward Bjerg
- Stensiø Bjerg
- Torkjellfjellet

== See also ==
- List of mountain ranges of Greenland
