= List of mountains in Greenland =

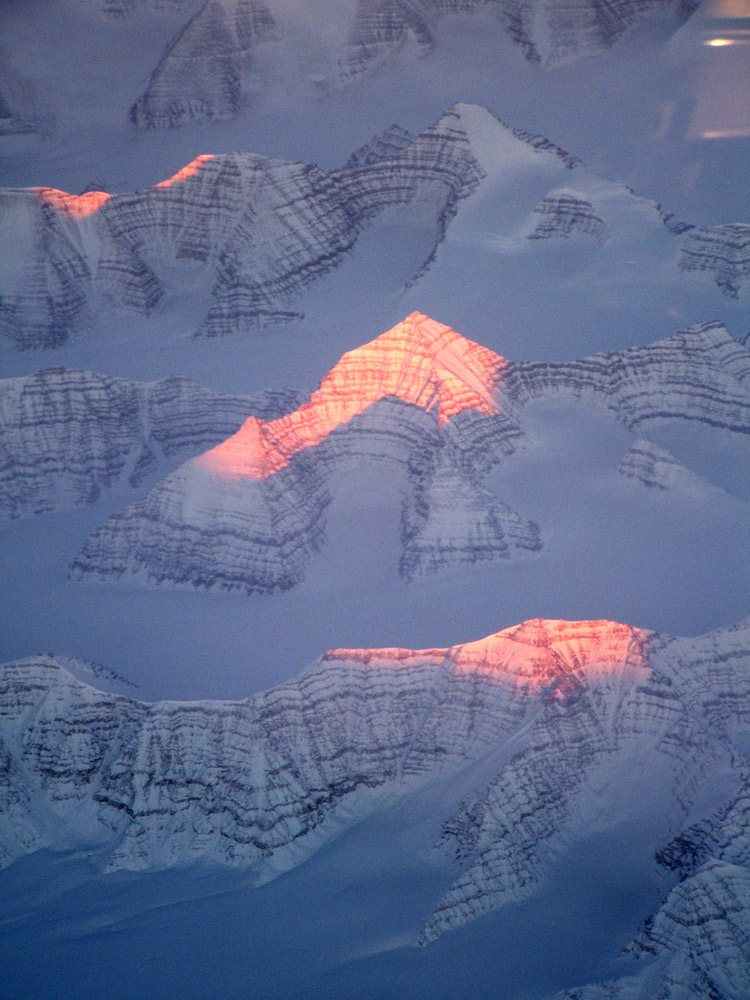
Mountain peaks lit by the sun in East Greenland

This is a list of mountains in Greenland.

== List ==
For each mountain, the municipality in which it is located is given, along with coordinates indicating the approximate centre of the mountain (follow the link to see satellite images of the location).

=== Above 3000 m ===
| Mountain | Coordinates | Region | Height (m) | Height (feet) | Notes |
|---|---|---|---|---|---|
| Gunnbjørn Fjeld | 68°55′N 29°47′W | Sermersooq | 3,694 | 12,119 | Watkins Range |
| Watkins Range (unnamed) | 68°48′40″N 29°33′26″W | Sermersooq | 3,606 | 11,831 | Part of a group of high peaks NE of Gunnbjørn Fjeld |
| Forel, Mont | 66°56′N 36°49′W | Sermersooq | 3,360 | 11,024 | Schweizerland |
| Watkins Range (unnamed) | 68°48′21″N 29°16′57″W | Sermersooq | 3,344 | 10,973 | Part of a group of high peaks NE of Gunnbjørn Fjeld |
| Ejnar Mikkelsen Fjeld | 68°53′N 28°37′W | Sermersooq | 3,282 | 10,769 | Ejnar Mikkelsen Range |
| Borgetinde | 68°51′N 28°14′W | Sermersooq | 3,267 | 10,719 | Borgtinderne |
| Crown Prince Frederick Range HP | 67°3′N 35°34′W | Sermersooq | 3,256 | 10,683 | Crown Prince Frederick Range |
| Summit —not a mountain in the strict sense | 72°32′N 37°29′W | NE Greenland National Park | 3,207 | 10,522 | Geographic high point on the Greenland ice sheet |
| Snebordet | 68°57′N 30°50′W | Sermersooq | 3,171 | 10,404 | Lindbergh Range |
| Crown Prince Frederick Range (unnamed) | 67°7′5″N 36°14′8″W | Sermersooq | 3,153 | 10,344 | Crown Prince Frederick Range |
| Crown Prince Frederick Range (unnamed) | 67°0′15″N 35°52′13″W | Sermersooq | 3,127 | 10,259 | Crown Prince Frederick Range, highest rocky peak of a massive nunatak with many peaks |
| Crown Prince Frederick Range (unnamed) | 67°3′3″N 35°44′47″W | Sermersooq | 3,108 | 10,196 | Crown Prince Frederick Range, the spectacular central summit of a nunatak with three peaks |
| Crown Prince Frederick Range (unnamed) | 67°9′23″N 35°36′9″W | Sermersooq | 3,092 | 10,144 | Crown Prince Frederick Range |
| Crown Prince Frederick Range (unnamed) | 67°8′39″N 35°44′33″W | Sermersooq | 3,088 | 10,131 | Crown Prince Frederick Range |
| Crown Prince Frederick Range (unnamed) | 67°4′22″N 36°2′31″W | Sermersooq | 3,075 | 10,089 | Crown Prince Frederick Range |
| Crown Prince Frederick Range (unnamed) | 67°0′10″N 35°52′50″W | Sermersooq | 3,069 | 10,068 | Crown Prince Frederick Range |
| Crown Prince Frederick Range (unnamed) | 67°4′17″N 36°12′59″W | Sermersooq | 3,056 | 10,026 | Crown Prince Frederick Range |
| Crown Prince Frederick Range (unnamed) | 66°59′20″N 35°34′8″W | Sermersooq | 3,021 | 9,911 | Crown Prince Frederick Range |
| Trillingerne High Point | 68°57′N 30°50′W | Sermersooq | 3,020 | 9,909 | Lindbergh Range |

=== Above 2000 m ===
| Mountain | Coordinates | Region | Height (m) | Height (feet) | Notes |
|---|---|---|---|---|---|
| Petermann Peak | 73°05′N 28°36′W | NE Greenland National Park | 2,940 | 9,646 | Fraenkel Land |
| Jaetteborg | 68°55′N 30°54′W | Sermersooq | 2,919 | 9,579 | Lindbergh Range |
| Dansketinden | 72°7′N 24°57′W | NE Greenland National Park | 2,842 | 9,324 | Stauning Alps highest point |
| Snekuplen | 68°53′N 31°11′W | Sermersooq | 2,825 | 9,270 | Lindbergh Range |
| Gronau Nunataks High Point | 69°27′N 30°8′W | Sermersooq | 2,812 | 9,227 | Gronau Nunataks |
| Norsketinden | 72°8′N 25°3′W | NE Greenland National Park | 2,756 | 9,042 | Stauning Alps |
| Sortebrae Range High Point | 69°2′N 26°49′W | Sermersooq | 2,734 | 8,970 | Sortebrae Range |
| Stockenbjoerg | 68°36′N 37°10′W | Schweizerland | 2,520 | 8,268 | |
| Actress | 68°35′N 31°50′W | Sermersooq | 2,514 | 8,248 | Lemon Range highest point |
| Mount Paatusoq | 60°52′N 43°44′W | Kujalleq | 2,488 | 8,163 | Paatusoq Fjord |
| Skærmen High Point | 60°50′N 30°13′W | Sermersooq | 2,449 | 8,035 | Skaermen |
| Lilloise Range High Point | 68°34′N 28°48′W | Sermersooq | 2,429 | 7,971 | Lilloise Range |
| Lilloise Range Northern Peak | 68°47′N 29°5′W | Sermersooq | 2,383 | 7,819 | Lilloise Range |
| Gefiontinde | 76°28′N 25°38′W | NE Greenland National Park | 2,364 | 7,756 | Queen Louise Land highest point |
| Margaretatop | 73°23.1′N 26°13.3′W | NE Greenland National Park | 2,360 | 7,740 | Andrée Land highest point |
| Revaltoppe | 76°39′N 25°42′W | NE Greenland National Park | 2,317 | 7,602 | Queen Louise Land |
| Tiningnertok (Apostelen Tommelfinger) | 60°35′N 43°49′W | Kujalleq | 2,291 | 7,518 | Lindenow Fjord |
| Rigny Bjerg | 69°10′N 26°24′W | Sermersooq | 2,224 | 7,299 | Blosseville Coast |
| Mount Lugano | 72°48′N 27°27′W | NE Greenland National Park | 2,194 | 7,200 | Gletscherland |
| Gaule Bjerg | 66°55′N 38°11′W | Sermersooq | 2,133 | 6,998 | off Schweizerland |
| Alpebjerg | 73°28′N 25°32′W | NE Greenland National Park | 2,052 | 6,732 | Andrée Land |
| Nalumasortoq | 60°23′N 44°28′W | Kujalleq | 2,045 | 6,709 | Tasermiut Fjord |
| Kangerluluk Range High Point | 61°9′N 43°44′W | Kujalleq | 2,020 | 6,630 | Kangerluluk Fjord |
| Ketil | 60°25′N 44°31′W | Kujalleq | 2,003 | 6,572 | Tasermiut Fjord |

=== Above 1000 m ===
| Mountain | Coordinates | Region | Height (m) | Height (feet) | Notes |
|---|---|---|---|---|---|
| Payer Peak | 73°8′N 26°23′W | NE Greenland National Park | 1,979 | 6,493 | Suess Land |
| Helvetia Tinde | 83°20′N 34°40′W | NE Greenland National Park | 1,929 | 6,329 | Roosevelt Range highest point; Peary Land |
| Ansbjerg | 63°34′N 41°40′W | Sermersooq | 1,917 | 6,289 | Thorland |
| Favre Bjerg | 73°56′N 23°17′W | NE Greenland National Park | 1,900 | 6,233 | Hudson Land High Point (height approximate) |
| Snehatten | 62°44′N 42°51′W | Sermersooq | 1,892 | 6,208 | Timmiarmiut Fjord |
| Ulamertorsuaq | 60°22′N 44°32′W | Kujalleq | 1,858 | 6,096 | Tasermiut Fjord |
| Tuvilissuaq | 60°11′N 44°30′W | Kujalleq | 1,838 | 6,030 | Torsukattak Fjord |
| Angiartarfik | 60°11′N 44°29′W | Kujalleq | 1,824 | 5,984 | Torsukattak Fjord |
| Angelin Bjerg | 73°9′N 24°19′W | NE Greenland National Park | 1,821 | 5,975 | Ymer Island |
| Hjelmen | 76°34′N 25°18′W | NE Greenland National Park | 1,758 | 5,767 | Queen Louise Land |
| Alleruusakasiit | 60°8′N 44°31′W | Kujalleq | 1,743 | 5,721 | Known for the Thumbnail cliff. Torsukattak Fjord |
| Azimuthbjerg | 63°27′N 41°50′W | Sermersooq | 1,738 | 5,702 | Skjoldungen Island |
| Mount Wistar | 82°53′N 32°30′W | NE Greenland National Park | 1,737 | 5,699 | Nordkrone |
| Qingassat Qaqqaat | 60°34′N 44°42′W | Kujalleq | 1,730 | 5,676 | |
| Tininnertuup Qaqqaat | 60°28′N 44°25′W | Kujalleq | 1,720 | 5,643 | |
| Wiedemann Range High Point | 68°39′N 28°29′W | Sermersooq | 1,715 | 5,627 | Wiedemann Range |
| Valhaltinde | 61°26′N 45°19′W | Kujalleq | 1,690 | 5,545 | |
| Qalutaassuaq | 60°12′N 44°31′W | Kujalleq | 1,665 | 5,463 | |
| Illerfissalik (Burjfjeld) | 61°03′N 45°17′W | Kujalleq | 1,662 | 5,453 | Near Igaliku |
| Sulussugutaasaa | 60°59′N 45°12′W | Kujalleq | 1,660 | 5,446 | |
| Taateraat (Mount Atter) | 66°02′N 52°16′W | Qeqqata | 1,640 | 5,380 | Evighedsfjord |
| Holm Land HP | 80°28′N 19°36′W | NE Greenland National Park | 1,627 | 5,340 | Princess Caroline-Mathilde Alps |
| Harder Bjerg | 73°25′N 22°50′W | NE Greenland National Park | 1,627 | 5,338 | Hjelm Range |
| Ensom Majestaet | 63°48′N 41°2′W | Sermersooq | 1,591 | 5,220 | Odinland |
| Allerulik | 61°04′N 45°10′W | Kujalleq | 1,587 | 5,207 | |
| Akuliarusersuaq | 60°34′N 43°44′W | Kujalleq | 1,534 | 5,034 | Lindenow Fjord |
| Suikkassuaq | 60°21′N 44°36′W | Kujalleq | 1,524 | 5,000 | |
| Putooruttoq | 60°14′N 44°40′W | Kujalleq | 1,519 | 4,984 | |
| Ingolf Fjeld | 66°25′N 35°38′W | Sermersooq | 1,503 | 4,931 | Kangertittivatsiaq |
| Iffit Qaqqaat | 60°30′N 44°35′W | Kujalleq | 1,488 | 4,882 | |
| Haffner Bjerg | 76°26′N 62°18′W | Avannaata | 1,483 | 4,865 | |
| Princess Elizabeth Alps HP | 80°44′N 18°47′W | NE Greenland National Park | 1,466 | 4,811 | Princess Elizabeth Alps |
| Utsussuatsiaat | 60°16′N 44°29′W | Kujalleq | 1,460 | 4,790 | |
| Issuttussoq | 60°11′N 44°22′W | Kujalleq | 1,457 | 4,780 | |
| Qasigeerneq | 60°17′N 44°41′W | Kujalleq | 1,450 | 4,757 | |
| Aqqutikitsoq | 67°06′N 53°13′W | Qeqqata | 1,448 | 4,751 | (old spelling:Avqutikitsoq) |
| Stjernebannertinde | 83°19′N 28°12′W | NE Greenland National Park | 1,433 | 4,701 | H. H. Benedict Range HP, Peary Land |
| Uumannanngua | 60°08′N 44°36′W | Kujalleq | 1,425 | 4,675 | |
| Kuunnaat | 61°13′N 48°25′W | Sermersooq | 1,418 | 4,652 | (old spelling: Kûngnât) |
| Sermitsiap Qaqqaat | 60°33′N 44°25′W | Kujalleq | 1,417 | 4,649 | |
| Daly Range HP | 83°20′N 27°26′W | NE Greenland National Park | 1,399 | 4,593 | Peary Land |
| Faraway How | 74°25′N 23°33′W | NE Greenland National Park | 1,398 | 4,587 | Wordie Glacier |
| Ilimmaasaq | 61°00′N 45°56′W | Kujalleq | 1,390 | 4,560 | (old spelling: Ilímaussaq) |
| Qassi | 64°09′N 51°17′W | Sermersooq | 1,382 | 4,534 | |
| Nasannguaq | 61°01′N 45°53′W | Kujalleq | 1,380 | 4,528 | |
| Ippissuasiip Qaqqaa | 60°25′N 44°49′W | Kujalleq | 1,376 | 4,514 | |
| Akuliaruseq | 60°29′N 44°46′W | Kujalleq | 1,352 | 4,436 | |
| Devil's Castle (Teufelsschloss) | 73°22′N 25°29′W | NE Greenland National Park | 1,303 | 4,275 | Andrée Land |
| Nuussuup Qaqqaa | 60°23′N 44°44′W | Kujalleq | 1,302 | 4,272 | |
| Niviarsiat | 61°25′N 45°13′W | Kujalleq | 1,300 | 4,265 | |
| Napasorsuaq (Kirkespiret) | 60°22′N 44°46′W | Kujalleq | 1,287 | 4,222 | Southern Sermilik fjord |
| Natinnguaq | 61°17′N 45°39′W | Kujalleq | 1,279 | 4,196 | |
| Killavaat (Savtakkerne) | 60°17′N 45°18′W | Kujalleq | 1,276 | 4,186 | (old spelling: Kitdlavât) |
| Qajuuttaa | 64°14′N 50°54′W | Sermersooq | 1,254 | 4,114 | |
| Usumeersip Qaqqaa | 60°30′N 44°52′W | Kujalleq | 1,248 | 4,094 | |
| Qajarsuup Qaqqaa | 60°29′N 44°53′W | Kujalleq | 1,229 | 4,032 | |
| Marrat Qaqqaat | 60°32′N 44°45′W | Kujalleq | 1,214 | 3,983 | |
| Naajarsuit | 61°02′N 45°48′W | Kujalleq | 1,212 | 3,976 | |
| Sermitsiaq | 64°18′N 51°30′W | Sermersooq | 1,210 | 3,970 | Sermitsiaq Island |
| Nakkaalaaq | 60°58′N 45°54′W | Kujalleq | 1,207 | 3,960 | |
| Naajatsiaat Qaqqaat | 60°32′N 44°47′W | Kujalleq | 1,196 | 3,924 | |
| Kingittorsuaq (Hjortetakken) | 64°07′N 51°35′W | Sermersooq | 1,184 | 3,885 | (old spelling: Kingigtorssuaq) near Nuuk |
| Ulunnguarsuaq | 61°14′N 45°47′W | Kujalleq | 1,160 | 3,806 | |
| Mara Mountain | 83°34′N 30°28′W | NE Greenland National Park | 1,155 | 3,790 | Roosevelt Range |
| Qaqqarsuaq | 64°14′N 51°03′W | Sermersooq | 1,154 | 3,786 | |
| Arpatsivik | 60°19′N 44°48′W | Kujalleq | 1,152 | 3,780 | |
| Ujarasussuttaliit Qaqqaa | 60°23′N 44°52′W | Kujalleq | 1,143 | 3,750 | |
| Uilorsuaq | 60°27′N 44°49′W | Kujalleq | 1,109 | 3,638 | |
| Arpatsiviip Qaqqaat | 60°18′N 44°53′W | Kujalleq | 1,107 | 3,632 | |
| Balkonen | 61°22′N 45°14′W | Kujalleq | 1,105 | 3,625 | |
| Paarnaliarsuup Qaqqaa | 60°18′N 44°52′W | Kujalleq | 1,101 | 3,612 | |
| Vegas Fjeld | 65°41′N 37°44′W | Sermersooq | 1,096 | 3,596 | |
| Ymer Nunatak | 77°27′N 24°37′W | NE Greenland National Park | 1,096 | 3,596 | |
| Kayser Mountain | 81°33′15″N 58°58′28″W | Avannaata | 1,094 | 3,589 | Haug Range, Hall Land |
| Qilakitsoq (Laksefjeld) | 61°16′N 47°56′W | Sermersooq | 1,091 | 3,579 | |
| Teqqiingalik | 64°08′N 51°27′W | Sermersooq | 1,075 | 3,527 | |
| Puilasorsuit Qaqqaat | 60°24′N 44°51′W | Kujalleq | 1,071 | 3,514 | |
| Uummannaq | 70°42′47″N 52°07′52″W | Avannaata | 1,070 | 3,839 | |
| Qupik | 64°13′N 51°06′W | Sermersooq | 1,069 | 3,507 | |
| Qaqortukuluup Qaqqaa | 60°51′N 45°47′W | Kujalleq | 1,059 | 3,474 | |
| Pisissarfik | 67°07′N 52°59′W | Qeqqata | 1,050 | 3,445 | (old spelling: Pisigsarfik) near Kapisillit |
| Qoornip Qaqqartivaa (Rødhorn) | 65°50′N 37°21′W | Sermersooq | 1,038 | 3,406 | |
| Matorsuaq | 60°45′N 45°16′W | Kujalleq | 1,023 | 3,356 | |
| Oriartorfik | 64°11′N 51°22′W | Sermersooq | 1,012 | 3,320 | |
| Imertivap Qaqqartivaa (Sofias Fjeld) | 65°42′N 37°35′W | Sermersooq | 1,010 | 3,314 | |
| Qimmeertaajaliip Qaqqartivaa (Polhems Fjeld) | 65°40′N 37°31′W | Sermersooq | 1,003 | 3,291 | |
| Inussussuaq | 64°04′N 51°12′W | Sermersooq | 1,001 | 3,284 | |

=== Other relevant mountains ===
| Mountain | Coordinates | Region | Height (m) | Height (feet) | Notes |
|---|---|---|---|---|---|
| Uunnguttoq | 65°37′N 37°48′W | Sermersooq | 973 | 3,192 | |
| Aqqitsoq | 64°11′N 51°26′W | Sermersooq | 943 | 3,094 | |
| Mittivakkat | 65°43′N 37°47′W | Sermersooq | 931 | 3,054 | |
| Pic de Gerlache | 78°36′N 21°40′W | NE Greenland National Park | 899 | 2,949 | Duke of Orleans Land |
| Qassinnguit | 64°10′N 51°20′W | Sermersooq | 895 | 2,936 | |
| Aqajarua | 67°06′N 53°34′W | Qeqqata | 894 | 2,933 | |
| Kangerluluup Qaqqaa | 60°36′N 45°31′W | Kujalleq | 890 | 2,920 | |
| Tasiusap Qaqqaa | 61°12′N 45°43′W | Kujalleq | 890 | 2,920 | |
| Meqqutoqqat Qaqqaa | 60°53′N 45°38′W | Kujalleq | 884 | 2,900 | |
| Kuannersuit (Kvanefjeld) | 60°59′N 45°59′W | Kujalleq | 879 | 2,884 | |
| Niaqornaarsuk | 60°18′N 44°41′W | Kujalleq | 876 | 2,874 | |
| Aajuitsoq | 64°07′N 51°28′W | Sermersooq | 855 | 2,805 | |
| Innajuattoq | 67°05′N 52°44′W | Qeqqata | 853 | 2,799 | |
| Mount Clarence Wyckoff | 82°48′N 23°20′W | NE Greenland National Park | 853 | 2,799 | |
| Mittivakkat | 65°46′N 37°29′W | Sermersooq | 852 | 2,795 | |
| Ittikasaat Qaqqaat (Blokken) | 65°48′N 36°56′W | Sermersooq | 851 | 2,792 | |
| Asingaleq | 65°52′N 37°40′W | Sermersooq | 847 | 2,779 | |
| Timilequssuanngua | 60°54′N 45°36′W | Kujalleq | 840 | 2,756 | |
| Niviarsiat | 73°4′N 25°13′W | NE Greenland National Park | 837 | 2,746 | Suess Land |
| Ymers Bjerg | 65°36′N 37°46′W | Sermersooq | 830 | 2,723 | |
| Avalaatseq | 65°51′N 36°57′W | Sermersooq | 829 | 2,720 | |
| Nuuluk | 60°58′N 45°26′W | Kujalleq | 823 | 2,700 | |
| Nina Bang Mountain | 81°38′22″N 57°38′58″W | Avannaata | 815 | 2.674 | Nyeboe Land |
| Sulussugutaasaasaq | 64°09′N 50°58′W | Sermersooq | 814 | 2,671 | |
| Taatsukajik | 65°36′N 37°03′W | Sermersooq | 807 | 2,648 | |
| Iviangiusaq Kangilleq | 60°51′N 45°54′W | Kujalleq | 805 | 2,641 | |
| Sisoorajooq | 64°08′N 51°31′W | Sermersooq | 792 | 2,598 | |
| Talut | 60°56′N 45°59′W | Kujalleq | 791 | 2,595 | |
| Ukkusissat Kangilequtaat | 64°11′N 51°33′W | Sermersooq | 787 | 2,582 | |
| Nasaasaaq (Kællingehætten) | 66°56′N 53°34′W | Qeqqata | 784 | 2,572 | |
| Ukkusissat (Store Malene) | 64°10′N 51°37′W | Sermersooq | 772 | 2,533 | |
| Nunasarnaasaq | 60°54′N 45°53′W | Kujalleq | 770 | 2,526 | |
| Mallemuk Mountain | 80°11′8″N 16°37′9″W | NE Greenland National Park | 762 | 2,500 | Holm Land |
| Erngata Qaqqaa | 61°17′N 45°34′W | Kujalleq | 749 | 2,457 | |
| Kiinaaliitaa | 60°35′N 45°40′W | Kujalleq | 730 | 2,395 | |
| Sivingasoq | 64°09′N 51°33′W | Sermersooq | 720 | 2,362 | |

== See also ==
- List of mountain peaks of Greenland
- List of mountain ranges of Greenland
- List of nunataks of Greenland
- List of Ultras of Greenland

== Bibliography ==
- Gazetteer of Greenland Compiled by Per Ivar Haug. UBiT, Universitetsbiblioteket i Trondheim, August 2005, ISBN 82-7113-114-1.
- Exploration and place names in Northeastern Greenland
