= List of mountain ranges of Greenland =

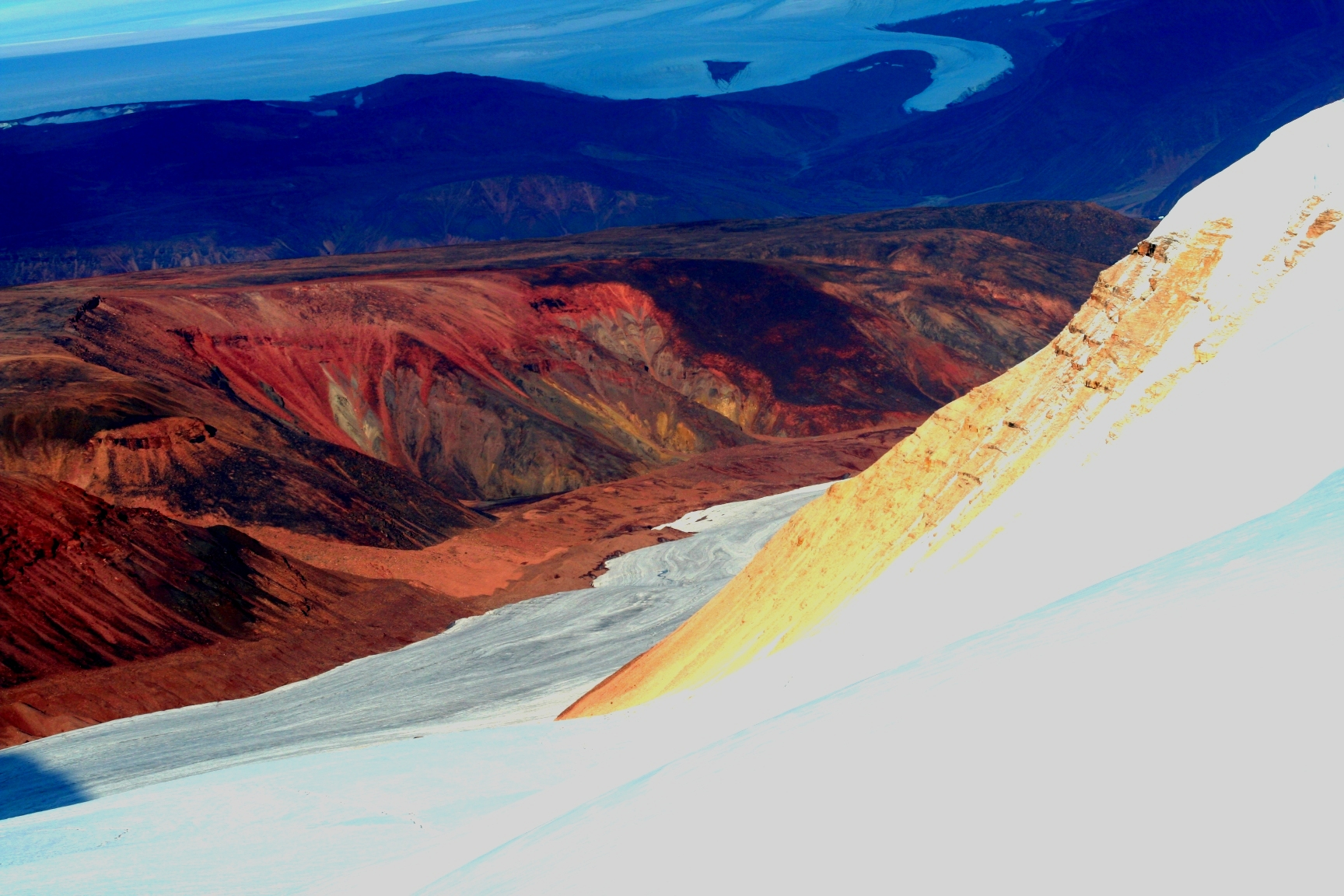
View of a range at the edge of the Greenland ice sheet. A great number of mountain ranges in Greenland are yet unnamed

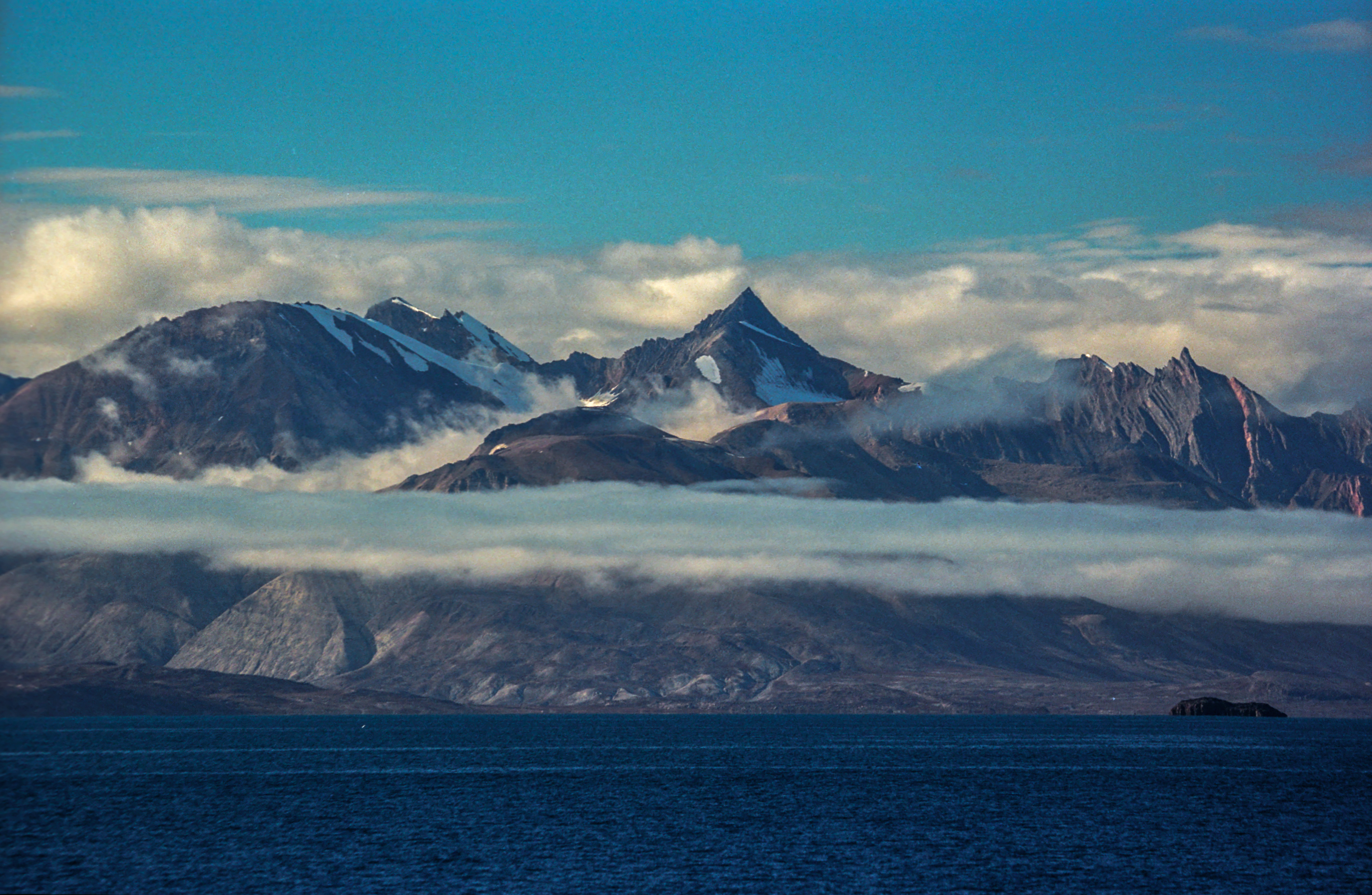
Mountains rising above Kaiser Franz Joseph Fjord

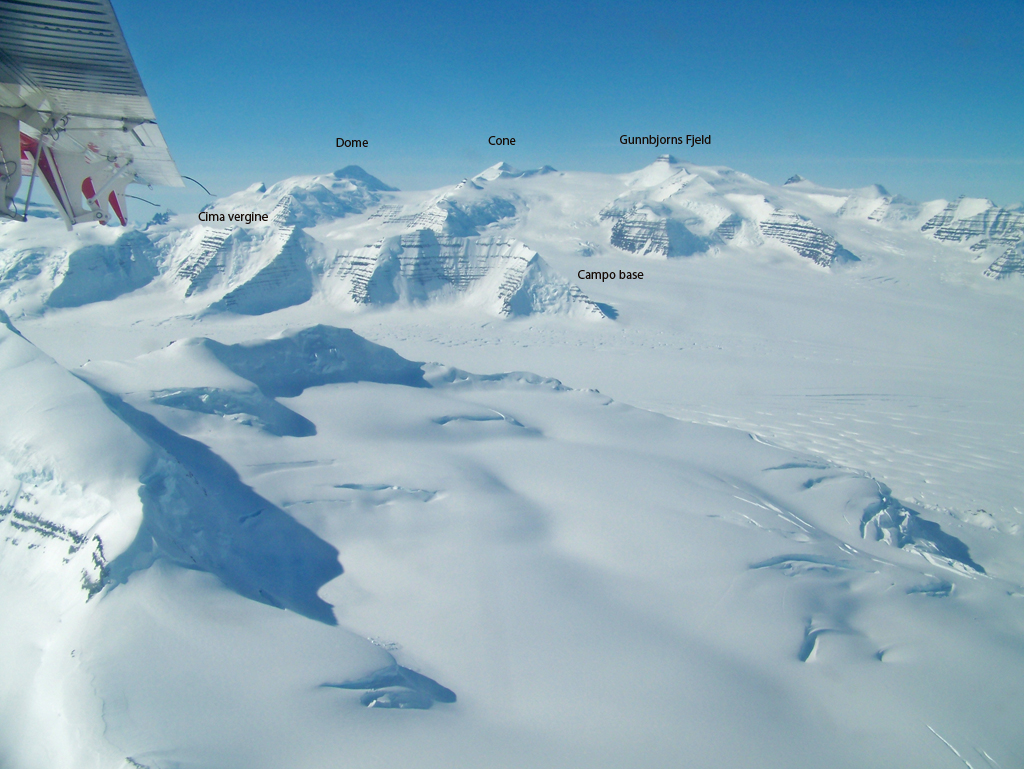
View of the Watkins Range

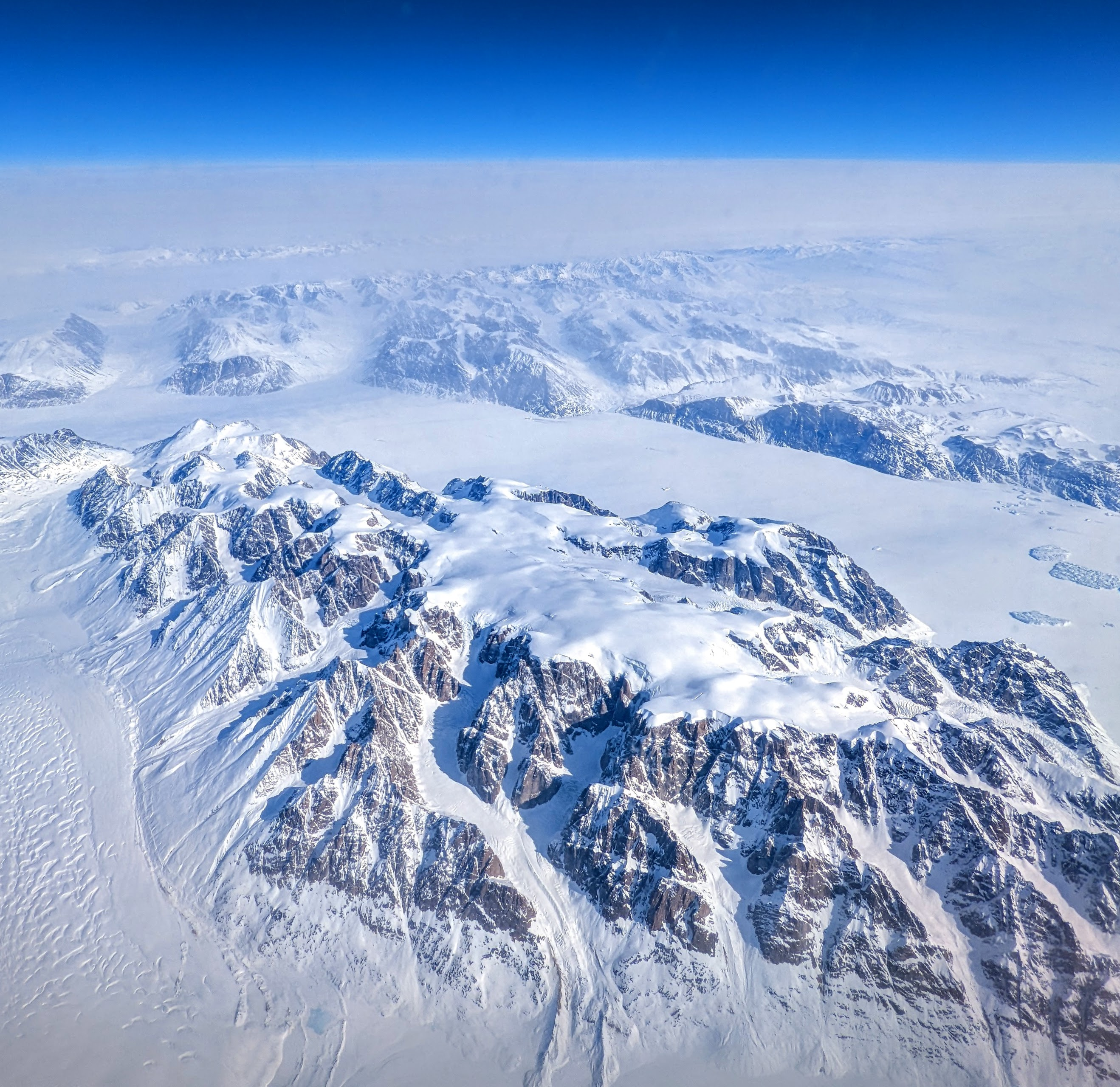
Kloftbjerge mountains in eastern Renland

This is a list of mountain ranges of Greenland.

== List by alphabetical order ==
- Alángup Qáqai, located in SW Disko Island
- Albert Heim Range (Albert Heim Bjerge), located in northern Hudson Land, north of Promenadedal.
- Alexandrine Range (Alexandrine Bjerge), rising above the southeastern shore of Denmark Fjord.
- Amitsorssûp Qulâ, located south of the Ameralik Fjord in West Greenland.
- Barth Range (Barth Bjerge), located in Queen Margrethe II Land.
- Borgtinderne, a long nunatak with multiple peaks east of the Ejnar Mikkelsen Range. Highest peak Borgetinde.
- Brages Range (Brages Bjerge), located at the western end of Odinland in a nunatak between the Fimbul and Sleipner glaciers at the head of the Bernstorff Fjord.
- Crown Prince Frederick Range (Kronprins Frederik Bjerge), very long range of nunataks stretching southwest of Kangerlussuaq Fjord, East Greenland.
- Daly Range (Daly Bjerge), a subrange of the Roosevelt Range located in Peary Land.
- Dannebrog Range (Dannebrogsfjeldene), chain of mountains and nunataks located in southwestern Queen Louise Land.
- Didrik Pining Range (Didrik Pining Bjerge), located in Liverpool Land.
- Dødemandstoppene (Danish for "Mountains of the Dead", lit. "Peaks of the Dead Men"), located in the Gronau Nunataks eastern zone.
- Ejnar Mikkelsen Range (Ejnar Mikkelsen Fjeld), a long nunatak with multiple peaks east of the Watkins Range.
- Ellemands Range (Ellemandsbjerge), located in Traill Island.
- Eventyrfjelde, a group of nunataks in southern Queen Louise Land.
- Fynske Alps (Fynske Alper), located north of the head of Denmark Fjord.
- Giesecke Range (Giesecke Bjerge), located in the east part of the Gauss Peninsula.
- Graah Mountains (Graah Fjelde), rise to the south of Kangerluluk fjord and are relatively free from snow.
- Gronau Nunataks (Gronau Nunatakker), a group of nunataks located in the area of the Gronau Glacier.
- Grønne Range (Grønnebjerge), located in Traill Island.
- H. H. Benedict Range (H. H. Benedict Bjerge), a subrange of the Roosevelt Range located in Peary Land.
- Halle Range (Hallebjergene), located in Clavering Island.
- Häsi Mountains (Häsi Bjerge), located northwest of Nathorst Land.
- Haug Range (Hauge Bjerge), located in Hall Land.
- Heywood Range (Heywood Bjerge), located in Liverpool Land.
- Hjelm Range (Hjelmbjergene), located on the southern coast of the Gauss Peninsula.
- J. A. D. Jensen Nunataks near the west coast of Greenland.
- Jyske Ridge (Jyske Ås), a ridge located south of Hagen Fjord.
- Kangerluluk Range (Kangerluluk Bjerge), rising on the northern flank of Kangerluluk fjord.
- Kangerlussuaq Peaks (Kangerlussuaq Tinder), located west of Kangerlussuaq Fjord, East Greenland.
- Kloftbjerge, rising at the eastern end of Renland.
- Klosterbjerge, located in Nathorst Land.
- Knud Rasmussen Range (Knud Rasmussen Bjerge), located in West Greenland, south of Tycho Brahe Lake at the terminus of J.P. Koch Glacier.
- Lacroix Range (Lacroix Bjerge), located in SW Andrée Land on the eastern flank of Isfjord.
- Lemon Range (Lemon Bjerge), located east of Courtauld Glacier which has its terminus in an arm of Kangerlussuaq Fjord, East Greenland.
- Lilloise Range (Lilloise Bjerge), located southeast of the Watkins Range in King Christian IX Land.
- Lindbergh Range (Lindbergh Fjelde), nunatak group located west of the Christian IV Glacier.
- Mary Peary Peaks (Mary Peary Tinder), Roosevelt Range located in Peary Land.
- Mols Range (Mols Bjerge), located in Traill Island.
- Murchison Range, a subrange of the Stauning Alps.
- Musk Ox Range (Moskusoksefjeldene), located in Germania Land.
- Nordfjord Plateau, located to the northeast of Kangerlussuaq Fjord, East Greenland.
- Nordkrone (Nordkronen), located in Peary Land.
- Norlund Alps (Nørlund Alper), located in northeastern Hudson Land, east of Stordalen.
- Paul Stern Land, an area of nunataks located in the SW area of inner Scoresby Sound.
- Pentamerus Range (Pentamerus Bjerge), located in far NW Greenland.
- Pictet Range (Pictet Bjerge), located NW of Antarctic Haven, on the southern side of Davy Sound.
- Prince of Wales Range (Prinsen af Wales Bjerge), located north of Kangerlussuaq Fjord, East Greenland.
- Princess Caroline-Mathilde Alps (Prinsesse Caroline Mathilde Alper), located in Holm Land.
- Princess Elizabeth Alps, located in Crown Prince Christian Land.
- Qalorujoorneq, located in Kulusuk Island.
- Qârusuit Range, located in the Nuussuaq Peninsula.
- Qivssakatdlagfik, located in Itilleq Island.
- Queen Louise Land (Dronning Louise Land), vast mountainous region located west of Dove Bay made up of several very large and numerous small nunataks.
- Rasmussens Range (Rasmussens Bjerge), name sometimes used to refer to the northern part of the Watkins Range between the 69th parallel north and the Gronau Nunataks.
- Rold Range (Rold Bjerge), located in Traill Island.
- Roosevelt Range (Roosevelt Fjelde), located in Peary Land.
- Roscoe Range (Roscoe Bjerge), located in Liverpool Land.
- Schweizerland, located north of the head of Sermilik in King Christian IX Land.
- Sioraq Range (Sioraq Fjelde), located near Tasiilaq.
- Sjælland Range (Sjællands Fjelde), located south of the head of Denmark Fjord.
- Skaermen (Skærmen), a long nunatak with multiple peaks west of the Watkins Range.
- Skirnir Mountains, west of Sehested Fjord.
- Sortebrae Range, located by the Sortebrae Glacier.
- Søbjergene, located in Liverpool Land.
- Stauning Alps (Stauning Alper), located in Scoresby Land.
- Svinhufvud Range (Svinhufvud Bjerge), located in Traill Island.
- Tågefjeldene (Ingolf Fjord), located on the west side of inner Ingolf Fjord.
- Tågefjeldene (Hold with Hope), located in the southern part of Hold with Hope.
- Wager Nunataks (Wager Nunatakker), a group of nunataks located southwest of the Magga Dan Glacier.
- Watkins Range, the highest point of Greenland is located in this range.
- Werner Range (Werner Bjerge), located in Scoresby Land, east of the Stauning Alps.
- Wiedemann Range (Wiedemann Bjerge), located in a nunatak stretching northwards at the head of the Wiedemann Fjord.

== See also ==
- Geography of Greenland
- List of mountain peaks of Greenland
- List of mountains of Greenland
- List of mountain ranges#Greenland
- List of Nunataks#Greenland
