= Rigny Bjerg =

Mountain peak in Greenland

Mount Rigny
- Rignys Bjerg
- Location within Greenland

Highest point
- Elevation: 2,734 m (8,970 ft)
- Listing: List of mountains in Greenland
- Coordinates: 69°2′55″N 26°49′23″W

Geography
- Location: Sermersooq, Greenland

Climbing
- First ascent: 2003

Mount Rigny (Danish: Rigny Bjerg, Rignys Bjerg) is a mountain peak in East Greenland. It is located in King Christian IX Land, Sermersooq Municipality.

The mountain was named by Jules de Blosseville, after French naval officer Marie Henri Daniel Gauthier, comte de Rigny (1782–1835).

== Geography ==
Mount Rigny is the highest peak in a mountainous area east of the Sortebrae Glacier close to the Blosseville Coast. Reaching 2,734 m (8,970 ft), Rigny Bjerg was marked on Jules de Blosseville's map of 1833 which also contained a drawing of the mountain's profile as seen from the sea. The mountain was then identified by the 1895-96 Ingolf Expedition led by C.F. Wandel, and its approximate position determined by the 1898–1900 Carlsbergfund Expedition to East Greenland led by G.C. Amdrup. This mountain's elevation and position are incorrect in the Defense Mapping Agency Greenland Navigation charts.

In Rigny Berg there are routes popular with mountaineers, such as "Snow Falcon", as well as neighboring peaks in the region such as RHARPeak. The first successful ascent in 1998 by Russ Hore and Al Read.

The first full ascent of Rigny Bjerg was made on 19 July 2003 by the 'Midnight Sun 03 Expedition'.

Certain studies claim that the mountain corresponds to the legendary Norsemen's Blåsærk and to the Mount of Gods Mercie named by Henry Hudson in 1607.

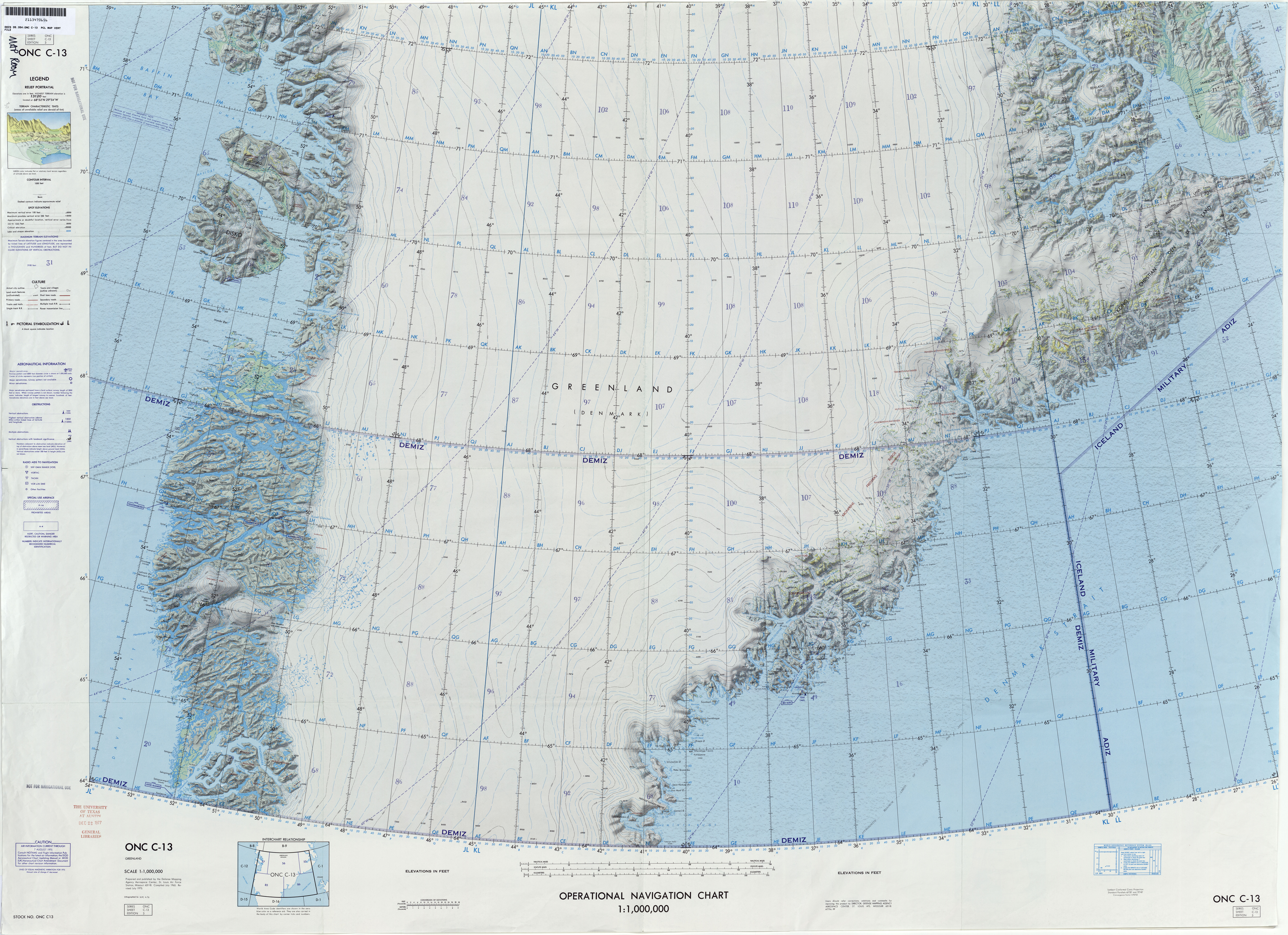
Defense Mapping Agency map of Greenland sheet.

== See also ==
- List of mountains in Greenland
