= Watkins Range =

Mountain range in Greenland

- Watkins Bjerge
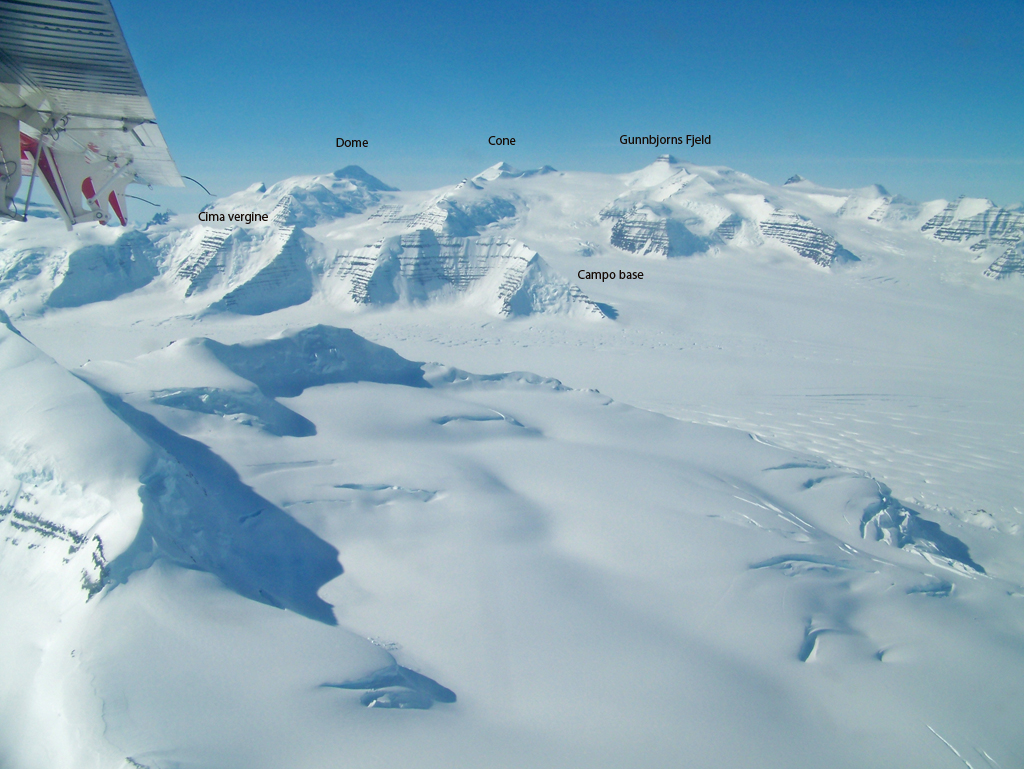
- Watkins Range

Highest point
- Peak: Gunnbjørn Fjeld
- Elevation: 3,649 m (11,972 ft)

Geography
- Location within Greenland
- Country: Greenland
- Municipality: Sermersooq
- Range coordinates: 68°45′N 29°38′W

The Watkins Range (Danish: Watkins Bjerge) is Greenland's highest mountain range. It is located in King Christian IX Land, Sermersooq municipality.

The range was named after British Arctic explorer Gino Watkins.

== History ==
Made up entirely of nunataks, this remote range was formerly an unknown area. In 1912 Swiss geophysicist and Arctic explorer Alfred De Quervain crossed the Greenland ice cap from Godhavn (Qeqertarsuaq) on the west, to Sermilik Fjord on the eastern side and saw a range system that he named 'Schweizerland', marking the position and approximate height of Mont Forel, the highest point of that area Lacking accurate data, Mont Forel was then thought to be the highest mountain in the Arctic Circle area, together with Petermann Peak far to the north.

However, in 1930 Gino Watkins, leader of the British Arctic Air Route Expedition, discovered a new mountain range from the air located over 350 km to the northeast of Schweizerland that he named 'New Mountains'. This was the higher Watkins Range with the Gunnbjørnsfjeld, the actual highest summit in Greenland.

In 1935 Lawrence Wager, who had been earlier with Watkins' 1930 expedition returned to East Greenland and opened a new route inland. During his venture he made the first ascent of the range's highest point, Gunnbjorns Fjeld. He was also able to sight as well the Lemon Range, a hitherto unknown range located to the north-east of Kangerlugssuaq Fjord.

== Geography ==
The Watkins Range is located in King Christian IX Land about 60 km inland from the Blosseville Coast. It is a system of nunataks surrounded by large active glaciers. The main glaciers are the large Christian IV Glacier to the west, the Rosenborg Glacier to the south and the Kronborg Glacier to the east. The range has massive ice-covered peaks and exposed cliffs. The primary summit of the range is Gunnbjørn Fjeld 3,694 m (12,119 ft), also the highest peak in the Arctic.

The Lindbergh Range rises to the west, beyond the Christian IV Glacier. Other high nunataks are located nearby, some being part of the greater Watkins Range system, such as the Skærmen to the west, the Ejnar Mikkelsen Range— and the Borgtinderne to the east, and the Lilloise Range to the southeast. The Gronau Nunataks are located to the north at the edge of the Greenland Ice Sheet, separated from the Watkins Range by the Christian IV Glacier.

'Rasmussens Range' (Knud Rasmussens Bjerge), from Knud Rasmussen Land mountains, is the name used in some sources to refer to the northern section of the range located between the 69th parallel north and the Gronau Nunataks. However, there is a mountain range located in West Greenland that is known by the name Knud Rasmussens Bjerge.

=== Mountains ===
The Watkins Range has a number of mountains higher than 3,000 m (9,800 ft), some of which are unnamed. Among these the following deserve mention:

- Gunnbjørn Fjeld - 3,694 m (12,119 ft)
- Gunnbjørn Dome - 3,682 m (12,080 ft)
- Gunnbjørn Cone - 3,669 m (12,037 ft)
- Peak - 3,606 m (11,831 ft) at 68°48′40″N 29°33′26″W, part of a group of high peaks north of Gunnbjørn Fjeld
- Deception Dome - 3,526 m (11,568 ft)
- Peak - 3,344.5 m (10,973 ft) at 68°48′21″N 29°16′57″W, part of a group of high peaks NE of Gunnbjørn Fjeld
- Istind - 2,667 m (8,750 ft)
- Ebeth - 2,595 m (8,514 ft)
- Lille Snefjeld - 2,511 m (8,238 ft)

=== Image gallery ===
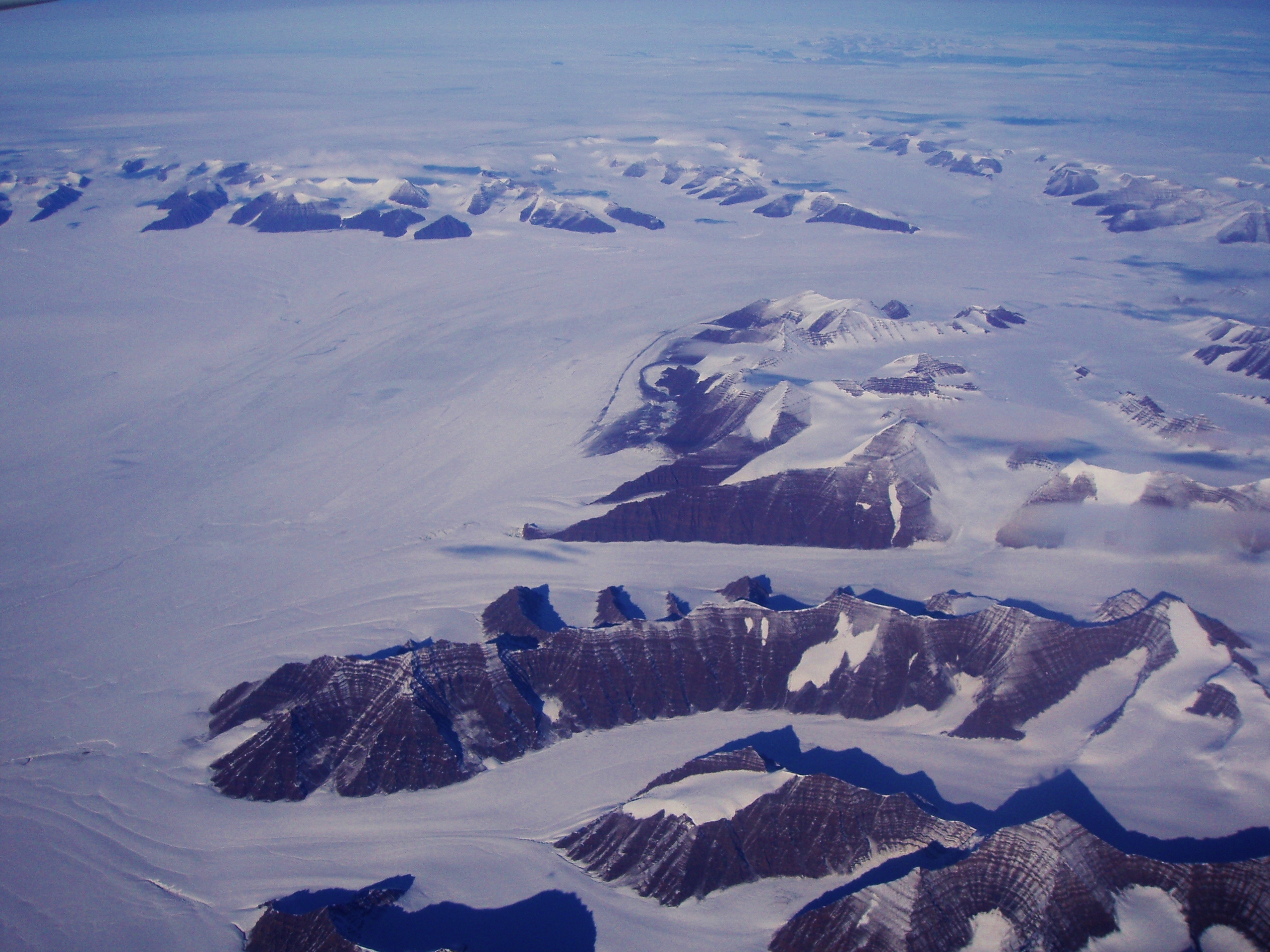
Southward bend in the Christian IV Glacier with the Gronau Nunataks in the background and the northwest part of the Watkins Range on the right

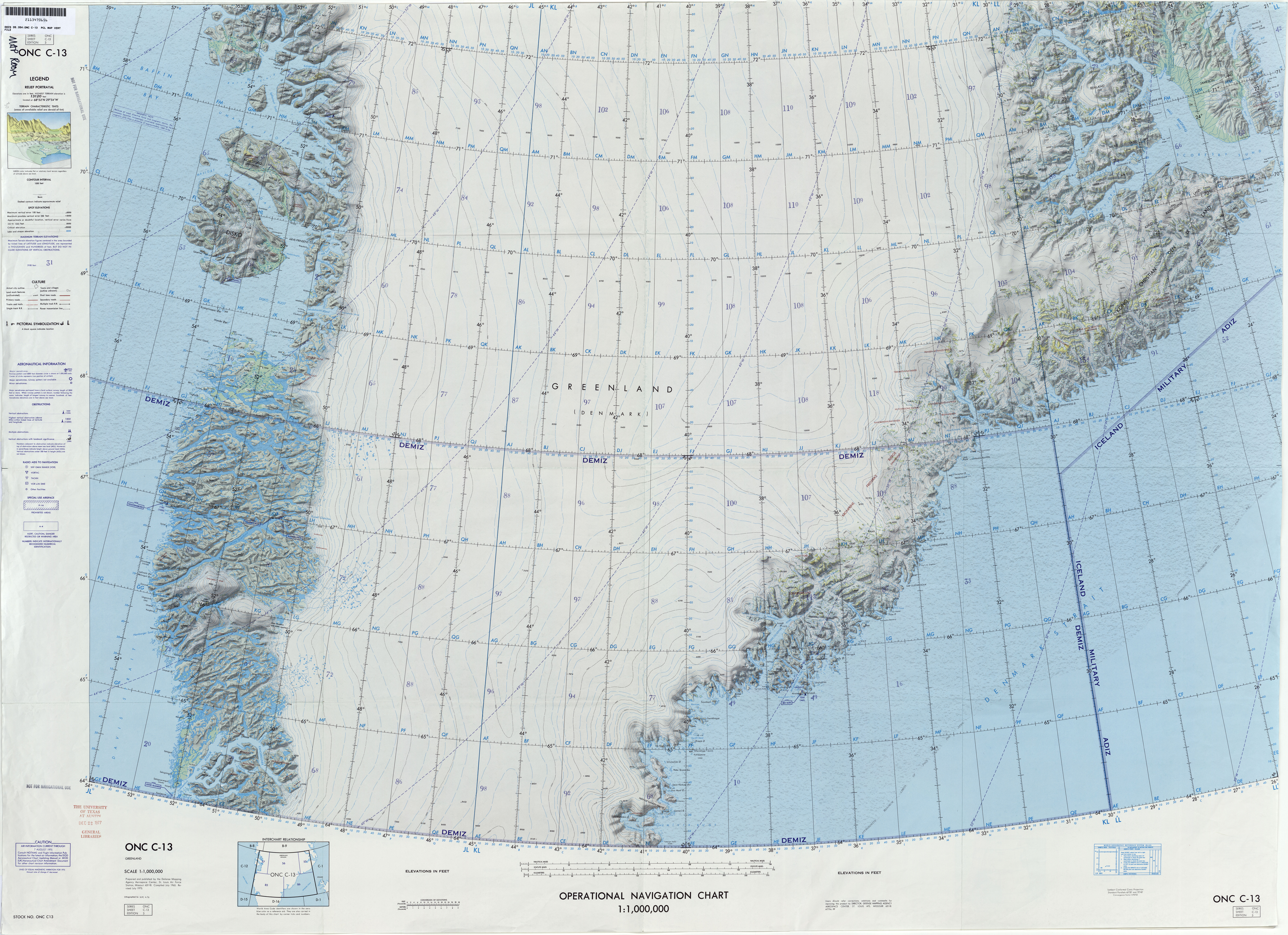
Defense Mapping Agency map of Greenland sheet

== Climbing ==
The Watkins Range has excellent snow as well as ice routes for experienced climbers. Good climbing conditions are present for the most part in July and August.

== See also ==
- East Greenland Orogen
- List of mountain ranges of Greenland
- List of Nunataks of Greenland
