= Ingolf Fjeld =

Mountain in Sermersooq, Greenland

- Location within Greenland

Highest point
- Elevation: 2,200 m (7,200 ft)
- Listing: List of mountains in Greenland
- Coordinates: 66°25′N 35°38′W

Geography
- Location: Sermersooq, Greenland

Ingolf Fjeld is a mountain in King Christian IX Land, Sermersooq, Eastern Greenland.

An attempt by Danish/British mountaineers to climb this peak was the subject of a 1981 Danish documentary movie named after the mountain.

== Geography ==
The mountain rises steeply from the shore at the northeastern end of the Kangertittivatsiaq fjord. Ingolf Fjeld was mentioned as a 7,300-foot-high (2,225 m) peak by Fridtjof Nansen, who further said that it is the first mountain one sees far out at sea in the Denmark Strait when approaching East Greenland from Iceland. Other sources give an elevation of 2,560 m (8,400 ft).

Freddie Spencer Chapman, the surveyor of the British Arctic Air Route Expedition described the mountain thus:

At the head of the fjord, away in the distance, was a superb pinnacled mountain reminiscent of St. Paul's Cathedral; this was Ingolfs Fjeld.

The South Face of Ingolfsfeld was climbed in 1975 by a team led by Steve Chadwick. The climb took four days in ascent and descent. 63 pitches, graded EDsup. The team also made the ascent and descent of the Croatian East Ridge in one 24-hour push.

== See also ==
- List of mountains in Greenland
