= Ejnar Mikkelsen Range =

Mountain range in Greenland

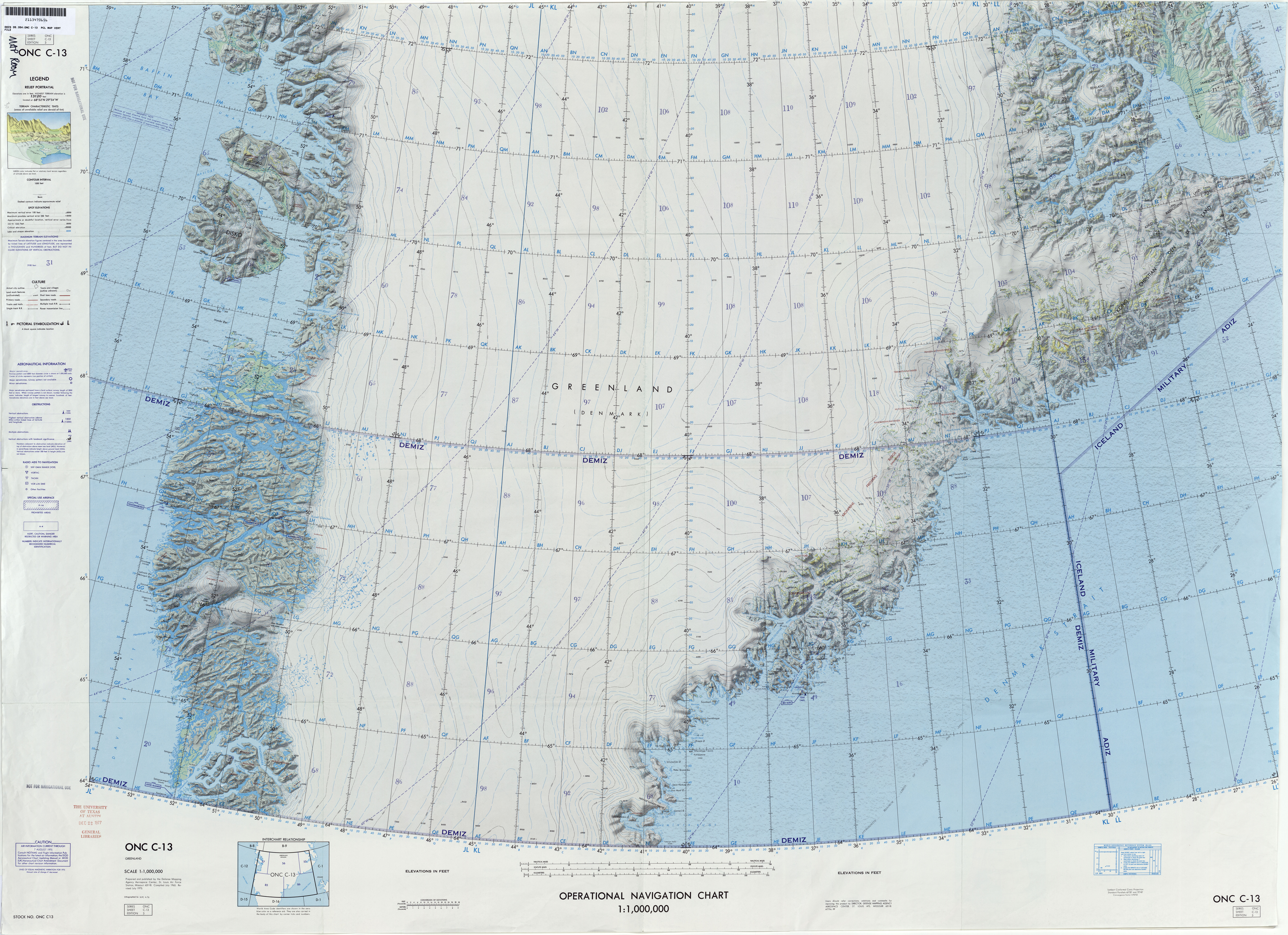
- Defense Mapping Agency map of Greenland sheet.

Highest point
- Peak: Ejnar Mikkelsen Fjeld
- Elevation: 3,282 m (10,768 ft)

Dimensions
- Length: 23 km (14 mi) N/S
- Width: 7 km (4.3 mi) E/W

Geography
- Location within Greenland
- Country: Greenland
- Range coordinates: 68°53′N 28°37′W
- Parent range: Watkins Range

Ejnar Mikkelsen Range (Danish: Ejnar Mikkelsen Fjeld) is a mountain range in King Christian IX Land, eastern Greenland. Administratively it is part of the Sermersooq Municipality.

The range is part of the greater Watkins Range and is named after Danish polar explorer Ejnar Mikkelsen. The highest peak is one of the most impressive mountains in Greenland and has a good reputation among alpinists. It was first climbed in 1970 by Andrew Ross leading a Scottish team, and for the second time in 1998 by Roland Aeschimann leading a Swiss team.

== Geography ==
The Ejnar Mikkelsen Range is a long nunatak with high peaks extending for about 23 km (14 mi) in a north–south direction. It is located east of the main Watkins Range on the eastern side of the Kronborg Glacier and west of the Borgtinderne, another nunatak with high peaks. Its northern end connects with the northern part of the Watkins Range. The area of this range is uninhabited.

=== Mountains ===
The highest point in the range is 3,282.7 m (10,770 ft) high Ejnar Mikkelsen Fjeld main peak, a massive mountain having a black rock needle at the top that marks the true summit. None of the other peaks in the nunatak rises above 3,000 m (9,800 ft). This summit is one of the highest summits in Greenland and it is marked as a 3,325 m (10,909 ft) peak in some sources.

- Ejnar Mikkelsen Fjeld (3,282 m); highest peak at 68°53′42″N 28°37′34″W
- Tall peak further south (2,724 m) at 68°50′54″N 28°37′34″W
- Tall peak further north (2,679 m) at 68°56′55″N 28°34′46″W

== Climate ==
Polar climate prevails in the region. The average annual temperature in the area of the range is -14 °C. The warmest month is July when the average temperature reaches -2 °C and the coldest is February when the temperature sinks to -22 °C.

== See also ==
- List of mountain ranges of Greenland
- List of mountains in Greenland
- List of Nunataks of Greenland
- List of the major 3000-meter summits of North America
- List of Ultras of North America
- Syenite
