= Lilloise Range =

Mountain range in eastern Greenland

- Lilloise Bjerge
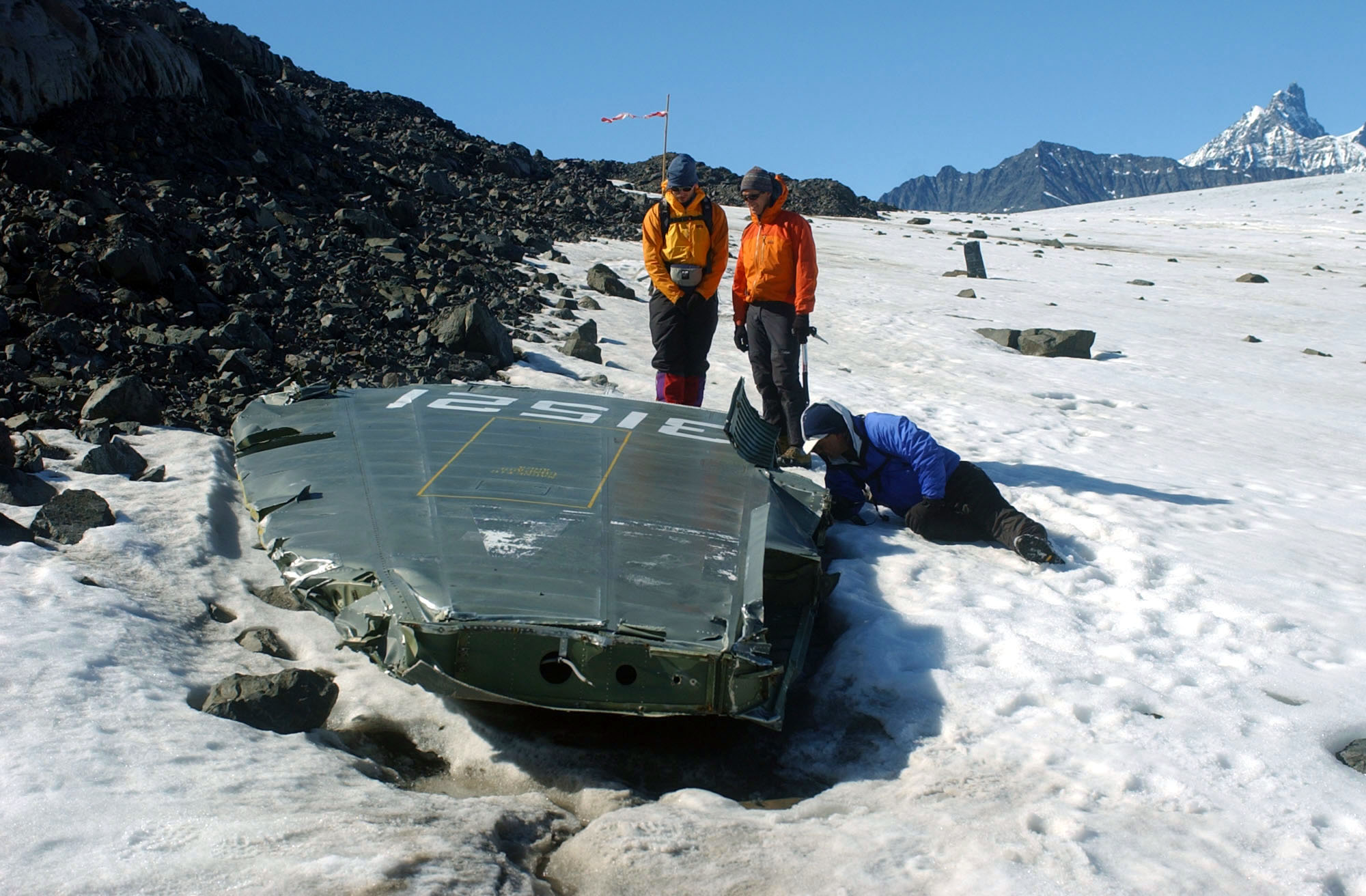
- Wreckage of a US Navy P-2V Neptune that crashed in the Kronborg Glacier with one of the peaks of the Lilloise Range rising in the distance.

Highest point
- Peak: Lilloise Range High Point
- Elevation: 2,429 m (7,969 ft)

Dimensions
- Length: 25 km (16 mi) N/S
- Width: 10 km (6.2 mi) E/W

Geography
- Location within Greenland
- Country: Greenland
- Range coordinates: 68°32′N 28°45′W

The Lilloise Range or Lilloise Mountains (Danish: Lilloise Bjerge) is a mountain range in King Christian IX Land, eastern Greenland. Administratively this range is part of the Sermersooq Municipality.

In petrology the Lilloise Intrusion is named after this range.

== History ==
The range was named after French Navy Lieutenant Jules de Blosseville's Brig of War La Lilloise that sank off the Blosseville Coast in 1833. Captain and crew perished and three expeditions organized to find the whereabouts of the ship failed to find any trace of the wreck.

In 1962, a VP-5 Lockheed P-2 Neptune on a patrol mission crashed into the slope of the Kronborg Glacier close to this range, killing all twelve men aboard. The crash site was finally discovered in 1966 when four geologists found it, but it was not until 2004 that the US Navy recovered all the crew remains and memorialized the deceased at the crash site.

In 1974 the Lilloise Range was explored by a team of mountaineers from the Sheffield and Aberdeen universities.

== Geography ==
The Lilloise Range is an up to 2,429 m (7,969 ft) high mountain massif made up of nunataks. It is located southeast of the Watkins Range between the Rosenborg Glacier to the west and the Kronborg Glacier —beyond which rises the Wiedemann Range— to the east. The southern end of the range rises close to the sea, in the Denmark Strait area, north of Cape Rink and NW of the Stephensen Fjord. The area of the range is uninhabited.

=== Mountains ===
- Highest Point (2,429 m) at 68°34′N 28°48′W
- Northern Peak (2,383 m) at 68°47′N 29°5′W

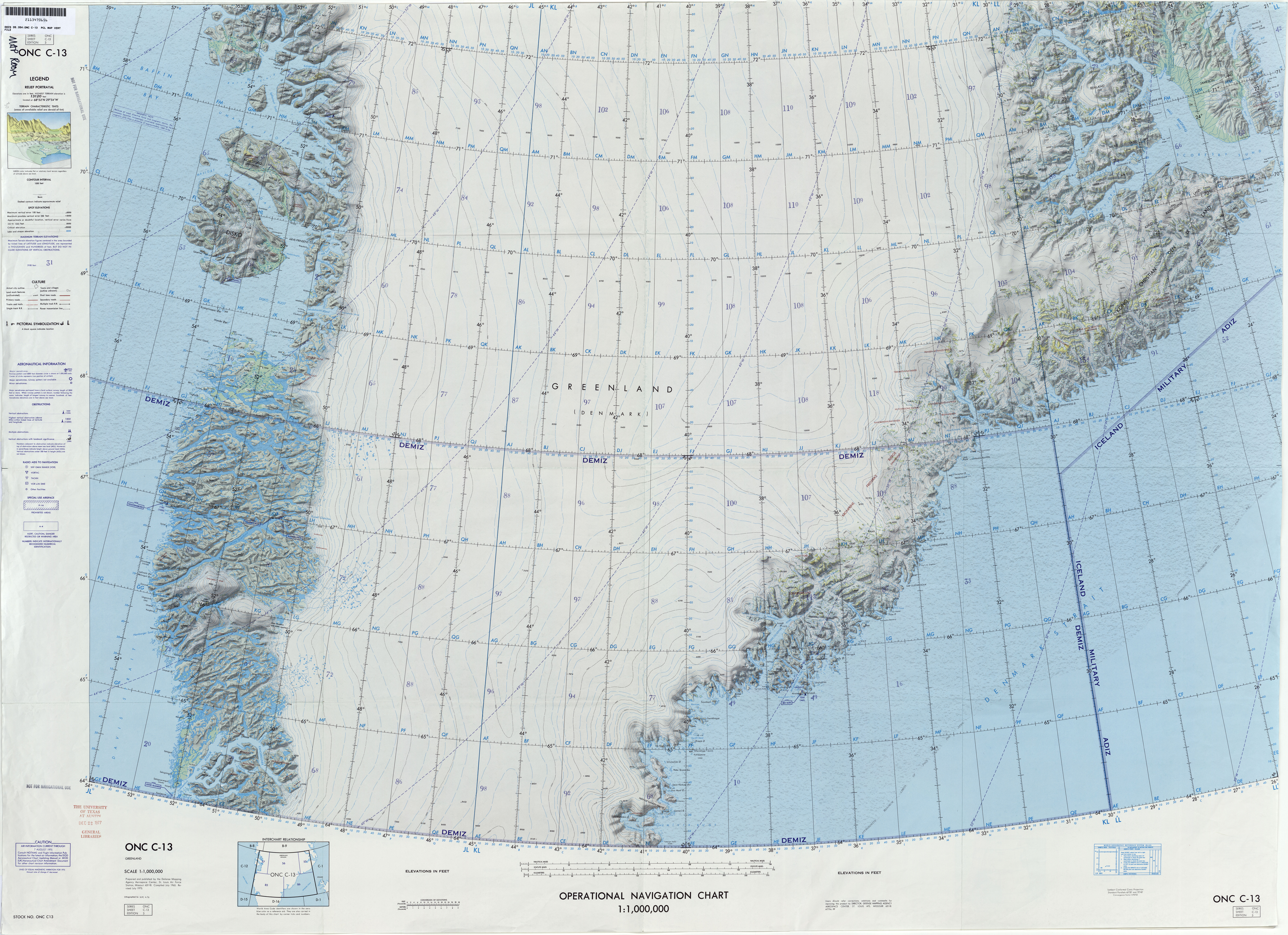
Defense Mapping Agency map of Greenland sheet showing the highest point of the Lilloise Range marked as 8202 ft, just below the Watkins Range

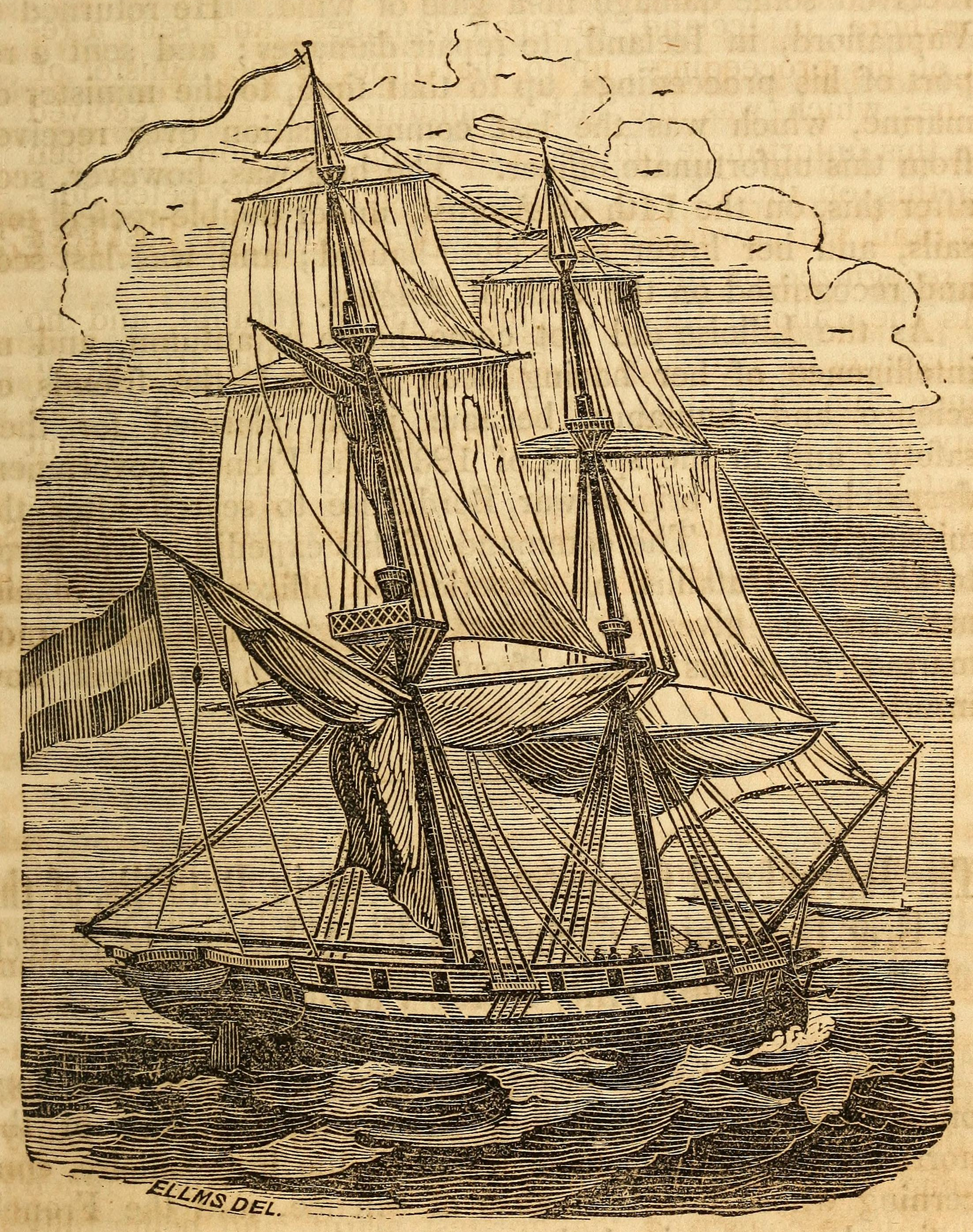
Ill-fated Brig La Lilloise, after which the range was named.

== See also ==
- List of mountain ranges of Greenland
- Blosseville Coast
