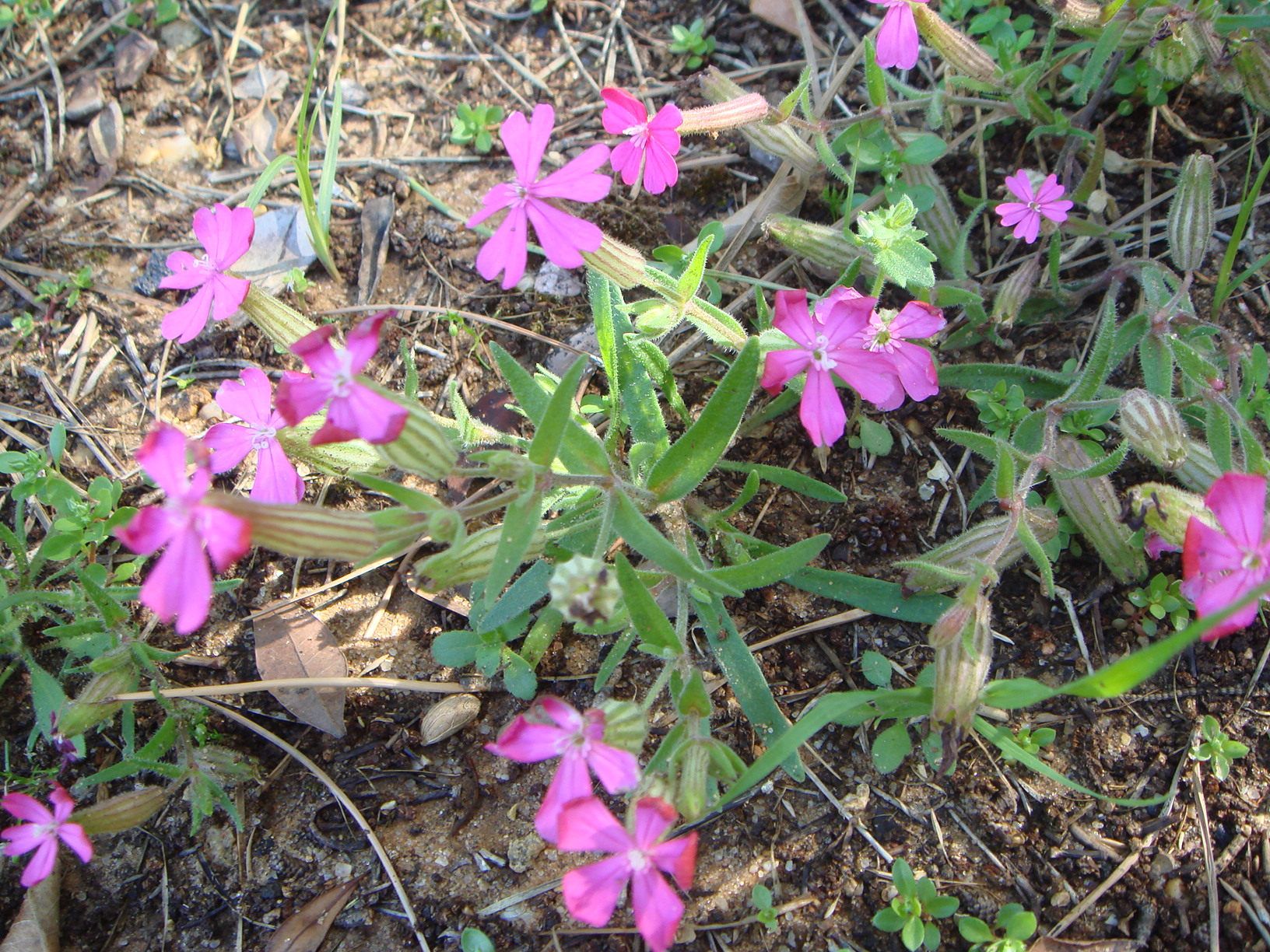

Conservation status
- Critically Endangered (IUCN 3.1)

Scientific classification
- Kingdom: Plantae
- Clade: Tracheophytes
- Clade: Angiosperms
- Clade: Eudicots
- Order: Caryophyllales
- Family: Caryophyllaceae
- Genus: Silene
- Species: S. stockenii

Binomial name
- Silene stockenii Chater

= Silene stockenii =

Species of flowering plant

Silene stockenii is a species of flowering plant in the Caryophyllaceae first described in 1973. The specific epithet is named after Christopher Maitland Stocken, who discovered it in 1962 in Bornos. It is native to Spain, where it is endemic to grasslands growing in calcareous soil on formations made from calcarenite (a type of limestone) west of Cádiz in Andalusia. It is currently listed as critically endangered. In 1993, the number of individuals belonging to this species was estimated to be below 2000.

Silene stockenii is a gynodioecious–gynomonoecious species. In this species 7% of individuals are females, 53.5% are hermaphrodites, and 39.5% are intermediate.
