= Wiedemann Range =

Mountain range in Greenland

- Wiedemann Bjerge
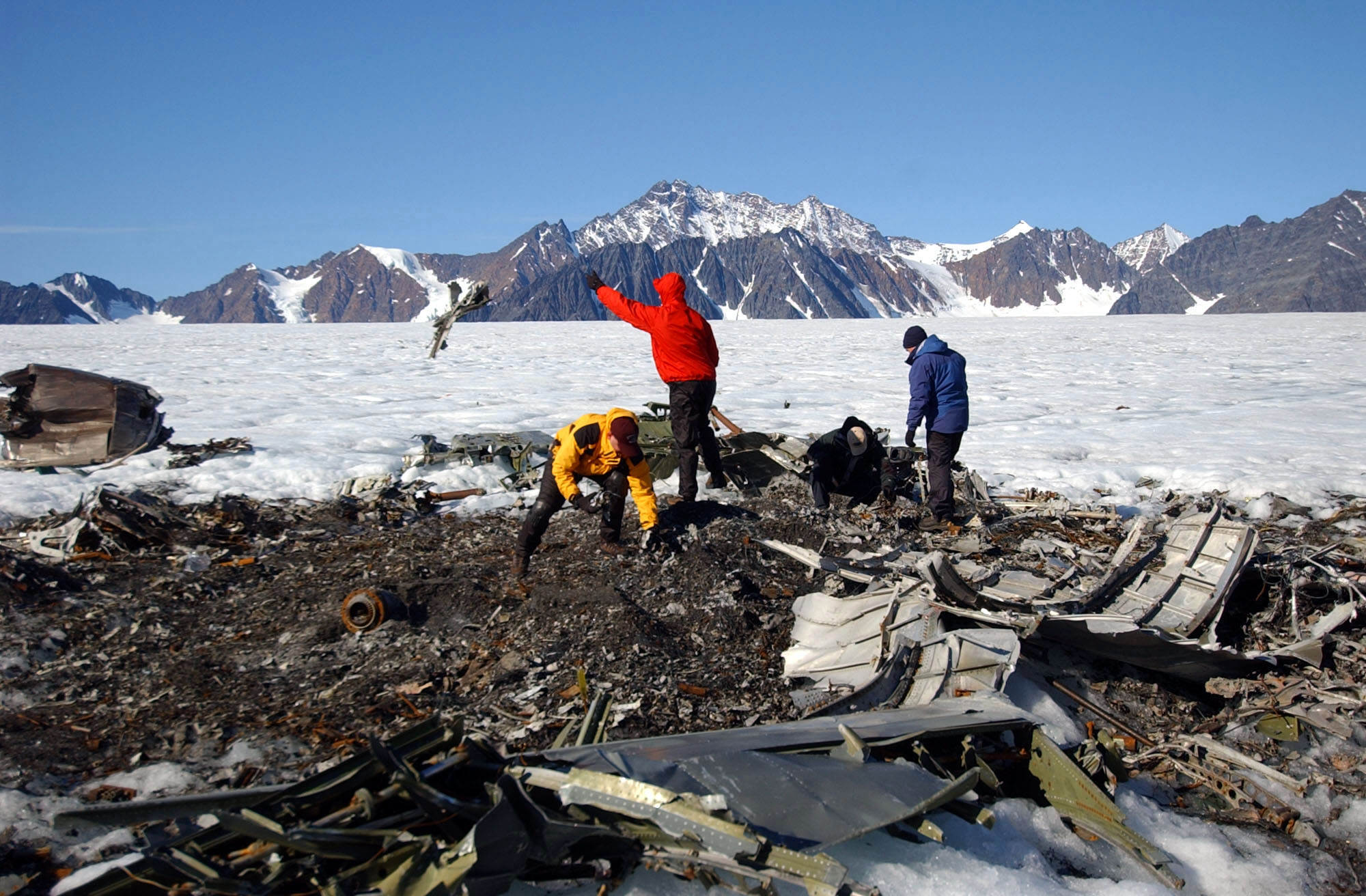
- Wreckage of a US Navy P-2V Neptune that crashed in the Kronborg Glacier with the Wiedeman Range rising in the background.

Highest point
- Peak: Wiedemann Range High Point
- Elevation: 115 m (377 ft)

Dimensions
- Length: 30 km (19 mi) N/S
- Width: 15 km (9.3 mi) E/W

Geography
- Location within Greenland
- Country: Greenland
- Range coordinates: 68°39′N 28°29′W

The Wiedemann Range (Danish: Wiedemann Bjerge) is a mountain range in King Christian IX Land, eastern Greenland. Administratively this range is part of the Sermersooq Municipality.

== History ==
The range was visited in 1932 by a team of geologists belonging to Ejnar Mikkelsen's Second East-Greenland Expedition. It was named after German naturalist Christian Rudolph Wilhelm Wiedemann (1770–1840).

In 1962, a VP-5 Lockheed P-2 Neptune on a patrol mission crashed into the slope of the Kronborg Glacier close to this range, killing all twelve men aboard. The crash site was finally discovered in 1966 when four geologists found it, but it was not until 2004 that the US Navy recovered all the crew remains and memorialized the deceased at the crash site.

== Geography ==
The Wiedemann Range is an up to 1,715 m (5,627 ft) high mountain massif made up of nunataks. The southern end of the range rises close to the sea, in the Denmark Strait area, north of Cape Stephensen and NW of the Vedel Fjord. It stretches northwards at the head of the Wiedemann Fjord, bound by the Kronborg Glacier to the west —beyond which rises the Lilloise Range— and the Borggraven Glacier to the east. The area of the range is uninhabited.

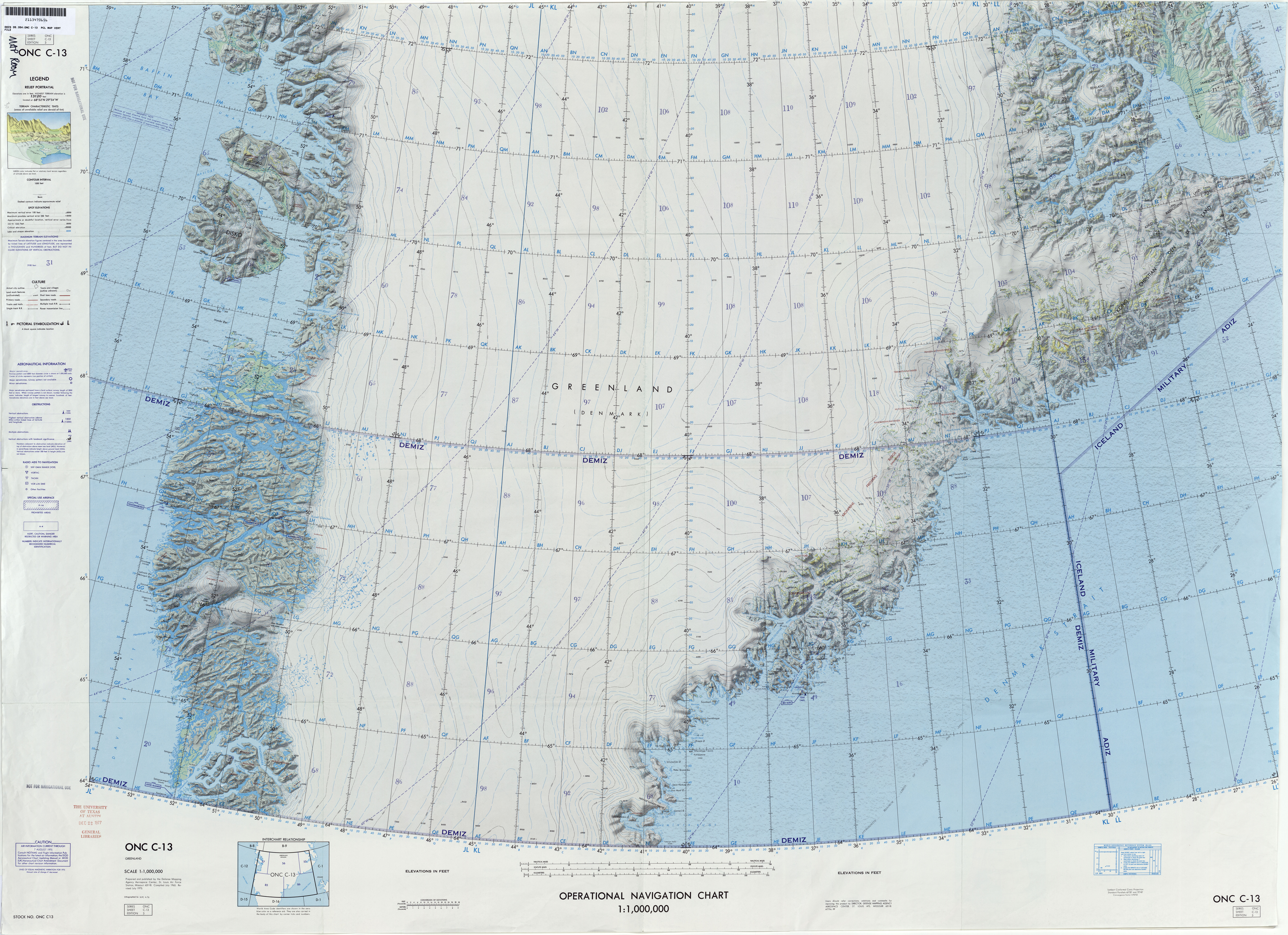
Defense Mapping Agency map of Greenland sheet.

== See also ==
- List of mountain ranges of Greenland
- List of Nunataks§Greenland
- Blosseville Coast
