= Pisissarfik =

Mountain in Greenland

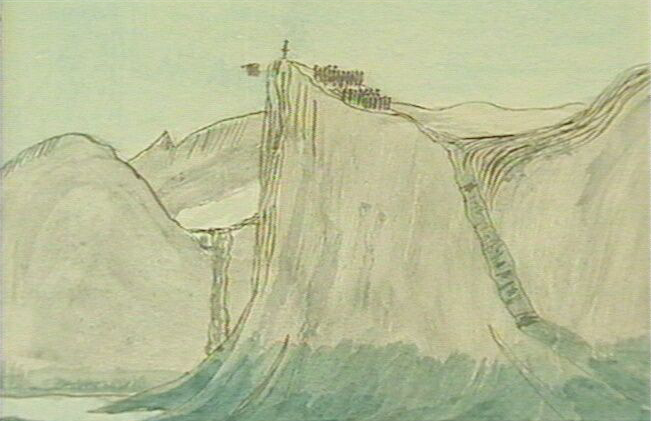
- Aron of Kangeq's illustration of the aftermath of the archery competition on the mountain

Highest point
- Elevation: 1,220 m (4,000 ft)
- Listing: List of mountains in Greenland
- Coordinates: 64°27′00″N 50°35′00″W

Geography
- Location within Greenland
- Location: Sermersooq, Greenland

Pisissarfik (old spelling Pisigsarfik) is a 1,220-metre-high (4,000 ft) mountain in the Sermersooq municipality, West Greenland. The mountain plays a major role in the Inuit mythology of Pisissarfik. It is also important as an archaeological site.

== Geography ==
The mountain is near the settlement of Kapisillit on the North bank of the Kapisillit Kangerluaq, a branch of the Nuup Kangerlua (Danish: Godthåbsfjord), about 150 km northeast of the Greenlandic capital Nuuk.

The inland side of the mountain is relatively smooth, but it forms a steep cliff by the coast. Pisissarfik is one of the most striking mountains of the region owing to its distinctive shape.

== History ==
Until about AD 1350 farmsteads forming part of the Western Settlement (Vestribyggð) were situated along the Kapisillit-Fjord. At that time there were often conflicts with the local Inuit; it is believed that this fighting (along with changes in climate) was one of the reasons for the disappearance of Scandinavian settlers from the region, and eventually from the whole of Greenland. The Kalaallisut name 'Pisissarfik' means 'shooting range' and derives from a legend of that time.

=== Legends ===
An Inuk and a Viking are said to have climbed to the summit and held a shooting competition with bow and arrow on a seal pelt, stretched on a bank of the fjord. The Inuk won and pushed the loser off the cliff to his death, per the terms of the Viking's agreement.

According to Inuit mythology, the final and decisive battle between the Nordic settlers and themselves took place at the foot of the mountain, and resulted in the extinction of the settlers. The people long considered numerous graves found at the bottom of the cliff to be those of people killed in this fight. However, scientists from the Danish National Museum, who examined the site between 1945 and 1952, found that they were in fact Inuit graves dating from the 16th to 17th century.

=== Archaeological Finds ===
The graves contained human corpses that had been preserved by natural mummification, as with those in Qilakitsoq. In one grave, three children were found, all under one year old. In another lay two women and two children, swathed in Reindeer skins. Even the clothing—anoraks made from bird and seal pelts, and Kamit (singular Kamik, seal skin boots)—were well preserved.

Pisissarfik played an important role in the Christianisation of the region in the 18th century: on Pentecost Sunday 1749 the first Deutsche Messe was celebrated at its foot.

== See also ==
- List of mountains in Greenland

== General references ==
- T. Ammitzbøll; M. Bencard; J. Bodenhoff; Rolf Gilberg; A. Johansson; Jørgen Meldgaard; Gerda Møller; Rigmor Møller; E. Svejgaard; L. Vanggaard (1991), "Clothing", in Jens Peder Hart Hansen; Jørgen Meldgaard; Jørgen Nordqvist (eds.), The Greenland Mummies (in German), London: British Museum Publications, pp. 116–149, ISBN 0-7141-2500-8
- "Siulleq Pisissarfik". Archived from the original on 15 July 2003. – Bilder des Pisissarfik
