= Kronborg Glacier =

Glacier in Greenland

- Kronborg Gletscher
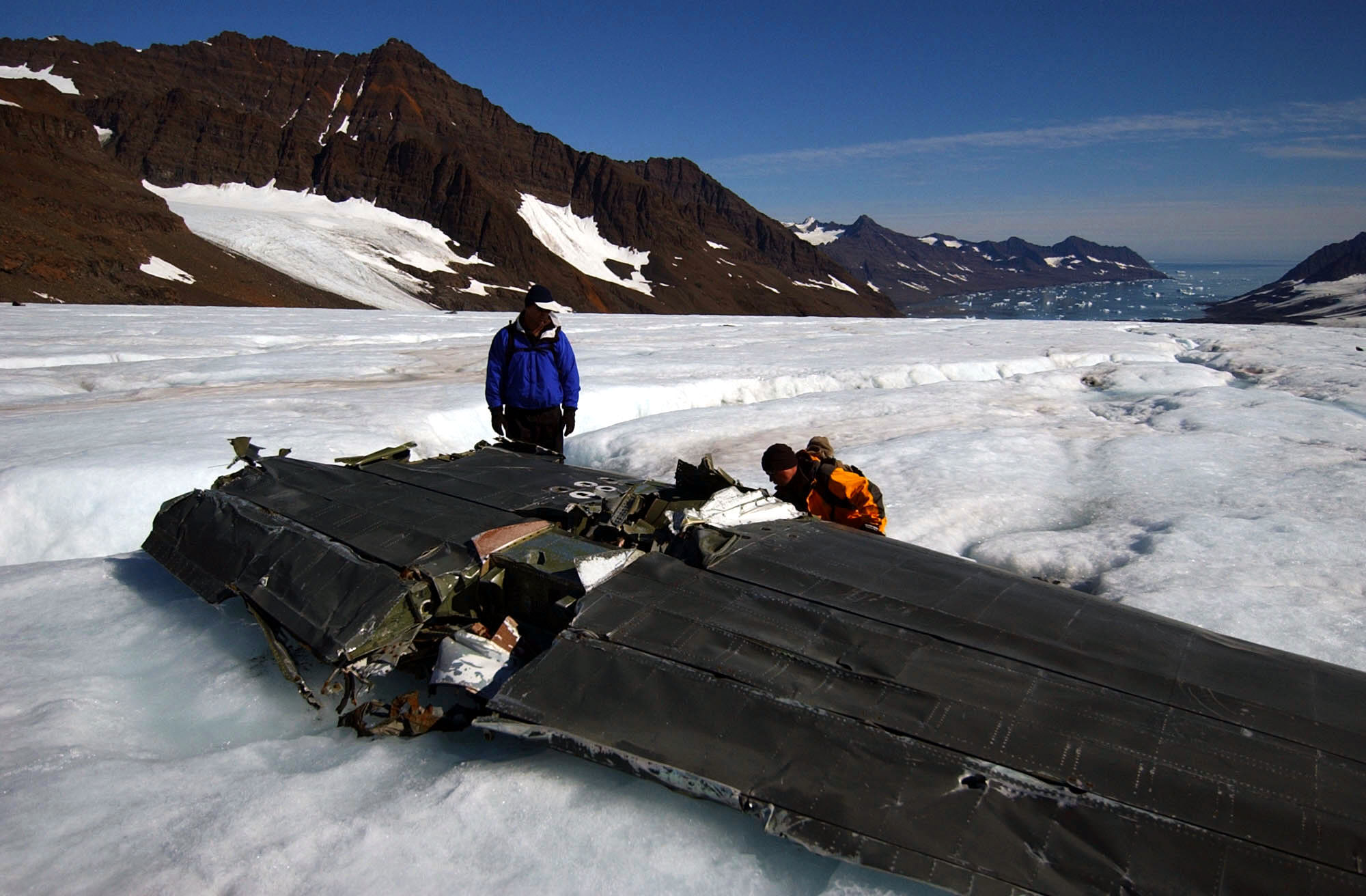
- US Navy personnel examining the wreckage of a Navy P-2V Neptune aircraft in the Kronborg Glacier with the Wiedemann Range in the background.

- Location within Greenland
- Type: Valley glacier
- Location: Greenland
- Coordinates: 68°45′N 28°37′W
- Terminus: Ravn Fjord; Denmark Strait

Kronborg Glacier (Danish: Kronborg Gletscher) is a glacier on the east coast of the Greenland ice sheet. It is named after Kronborg Castle in Denmark. Administratively this glacier is part of the Sermersooq Municipality. The area surrounding the Kronborg Glacier is remote and uninhabited.

== History ==
In 1962, a VP-5 Lockheed P-2 Neptune on a routine patrol mission crashed into the slope of the Kronborg Glacier in unknown circumstances, killing all twelve men aboard. The place where the plane had crashed was finally discovered in 1966 when four geologists found the remains, but it was not until 2004 that the US Navy recovered all the crew remains and memorialized the deceased at the crash site.

== Geography ==
The Kronborg Glacier is a non-surge type valley glacier that does not drain the Greenland ice sheet directly, but flows partly from it across mountainous areas in a roughly north–south direction. It separates the Ejnar Mikkelsen Range in the west from the Borgtinderne in the east. Further south it separates the Watkins Range and the Lilloise Range in the west from the Wiedemann Range in the east, until its terminus at the head of the Ravn Fjord in the East Greenland coast.

A fast-flowing glacier, it is similar in structure to the neighbouring Christian IV Glacier. The Rosenborg Glacier is a smaller glacier flowing between both.

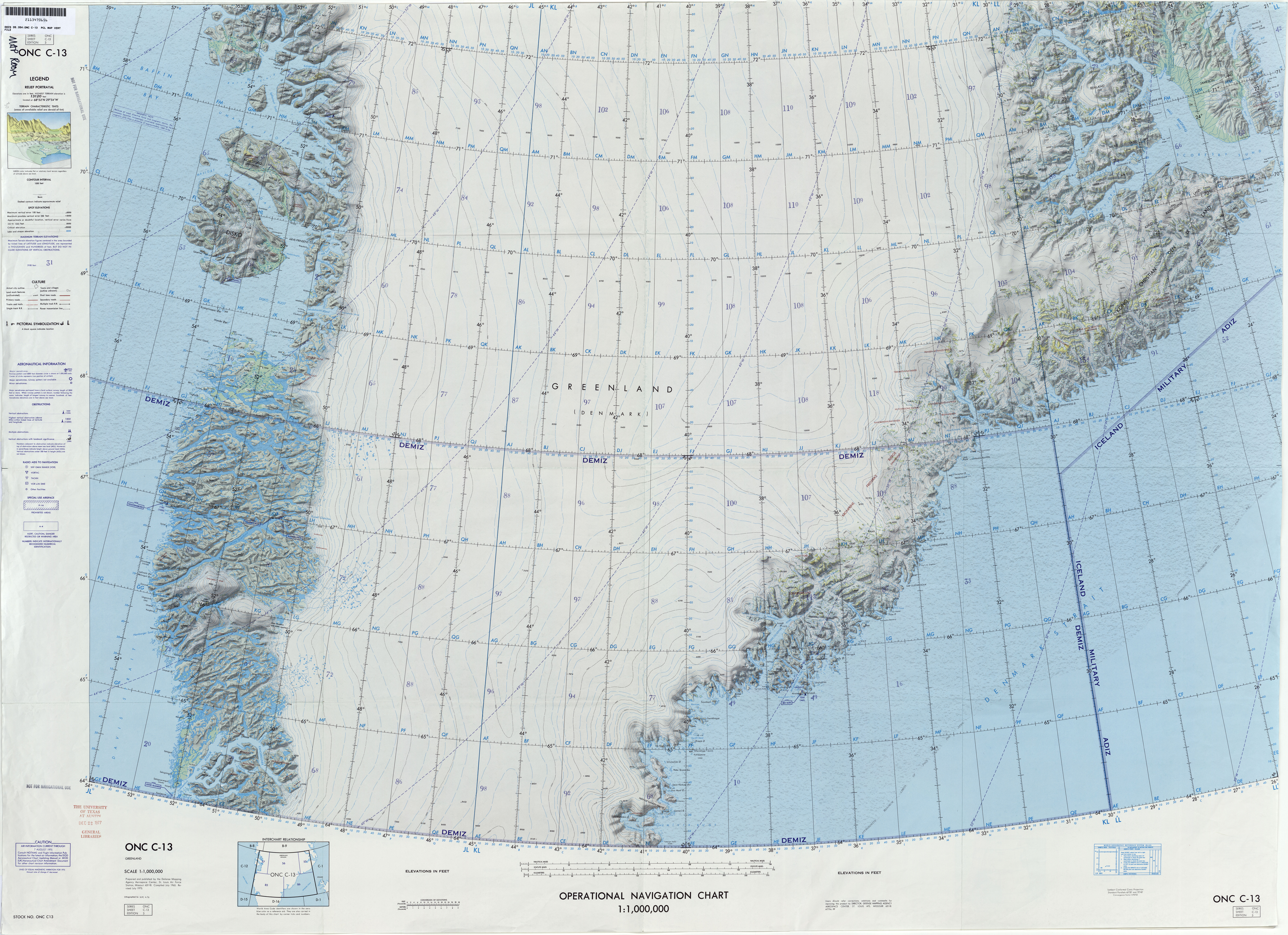
Defense Mapping Agency map of Greenland sheet showing the Kronborg Glacier.

== See also ==
- List of glaciers in Greenland
