= Borgtinderne =

Mountain range in Greenland

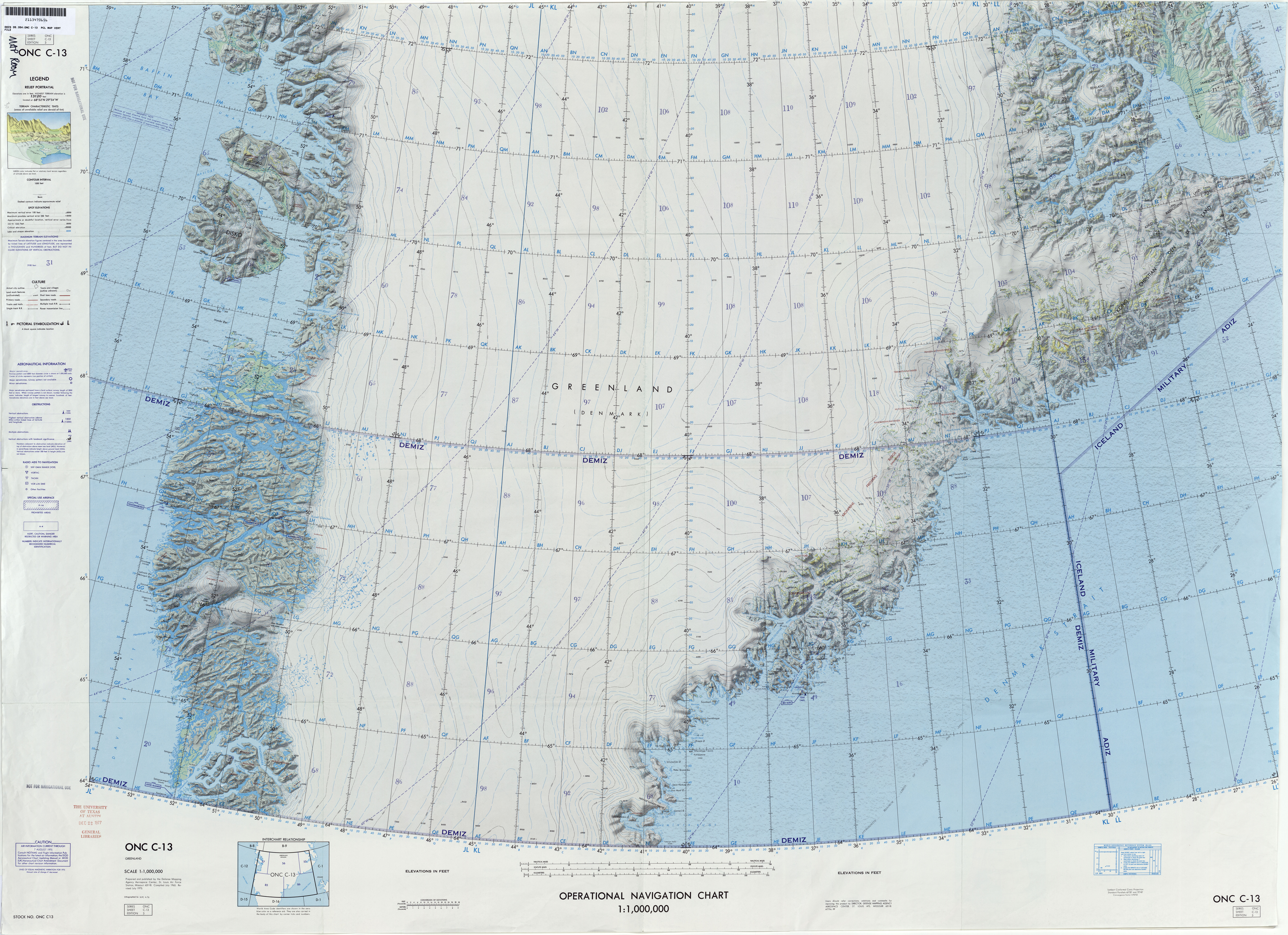
- Defense Mapping Agency map of Greenland sheet.

Highest point
- Peak: Borgetinde
- Elevation: 3,265 m (10,712 ft)

Dimensions
- Length: 57 km (35 mi) N/S
- Width: 17 km (11 mi) E/W

Geography
- Location within Greenland
- Country: Greenland
- Range coordinates: 68°51′N 28°14′W

Borgtinderne, meaning 'Castle Pinnacles' in the Danish language, is a mountain range in King Christian IX Land, eastern Greenland. Administratively, this range is part of the Sermersooq Municipality.

== Geography ==
The Borgtinderne is a long nunatak with high mountains. It is located east of the Ejnar Mikkelsen Range, between the Borggraven Glacier on its eastern and the Kronborg Glacier on its western side. The southern end of the range reaches the coast. The area of the Borgtinderne is uninhabited.

=== Mountains ===
The highest point is Borgetinde, a mountain which has a wide reputation among alpinists and which is the easternmost 3,000 m (9,800 ft) summit of Greenland and greater North America.

- Borgetinde (3,265 m); highest peak at 68°51′9″N 28°14′15″W
- Tall peak further north (3,197 m) at 68°55′12″N 28°14′21″W
- Peak SW of the tallest (2,909 m) at 68°49′45″N 28°20′39″W
- Northern end peak (2,389 m) at 68°57′45″N 28°14′30″W

== Climate ==
Tundra climate prevails in the region. The average annual temperature in the area of the range is −12 °C. The warmest month is July when the average temperature reaches 0 °C and the coldest is February when the temperature sinks to −21 °C.

== See also ==
- List of mountain ranges of Greenland
- List of mountains in Greenland
- List of Nunataks of Greenland
- Syenite
