= Knud Rasmussen Range =

Mountain range in Greenland

- Usugdluk
- Location within Greenland

Highest point
- Elevation: 408 m (1,339 ft)

Dimensions
- Length: 17 km (11 mi) NW/SE
- Width: 8 km (5.0 mi) NE/SW

Geography
- Country: Greenland
- Range coordinates: 68°2′N 50°17′W

The Knud Rasmussen Range (Danish: Knud Rasmussen Bjerge), also known as Usugdluk, is a mountain range in West Greenland. Administratively this range is part of Qeqertalik municipality.

The range is named after Greenlandic/Danish polar explorer Knud Rasmussen.

== Geography ==
The Knud Rasmussen Range is a low mountain chain located west of the Greenland Ice Sheet. It lies south of Tycho Brahe Lake at the terminus of J.P. Koch Glacier and north of Usulluup Sermia glacier. Its average elevation is 305 m (1,001 ft). The Otto Nordenskjöld Valley divides the range in two parts. The area of the mountain range is uninhabited.

== Climate ==
Tundra climate prevails in the Knud Rasmussen Range. The average annual temperature in the area of the range is -10 °C. The warmest month is July when the average temperature reaches 4 °C and the coldest is February when the temperature sinks to -20 °C.

== See also ==
- List of mountain ranges of Greenland
