= Kangertittivatsiaq =

Fjord in Greenland

- Kangerdlugssuatsiak
- Location in Greenland
- Location: East Greenland
- Coordinates: 66°22′N 35°46′W
- Ocean/sea sources: North Atlantic Ocean
- Basin countries: Greenland
- Max. length: 26 km (16 mi)
- Max. width: 3.5 km (2.2 mi)

Kangertittivatsiaq, old spelling Kangerdlugssuatsiak, meaning "The rather large fjord," is a fjord in Sermersooq, Eastern Greenland.

There are numerous ruins of former relatively large Inuit settlements near the mouth of the fjord. These were first reported by Georg Carl Amdrup at the turn of the 20th century when no Inuit were living in the area anymore.

== Geography ==
Kangertittivatsiaq

Kangertittivatsiaq is located in King Christian IX Land, north of Tasiilaq (Amassalik). It is a long fjord running roughly from northwest to southeast for about 26 km. Nordfjord branches northwards at the southern end of the fjord and Sammilik Fjord branches roughly southwestwards on the western side of its mouth. Storo Island and smaller Eskimo Island are located off the fjord's mouth to the south.

=== Mountains ===
There are high mountains on both sides of Kangertittivatsiaq. Well-known Ingolf Fjeld rises to a height of 1,503 m (4,931 ft) on the northeastern side of the inner fjord at 66°25′N 35°38′W.

== Bibliography ==
- Spencer Apollonio, Lands That Hold One Spellbound: A Story of East Greenland, 2008

== See also ==
- List of fjords of Greenland
