= Christian IV Glacier =

Glacier in Greenland

- Christian IV Gletscher
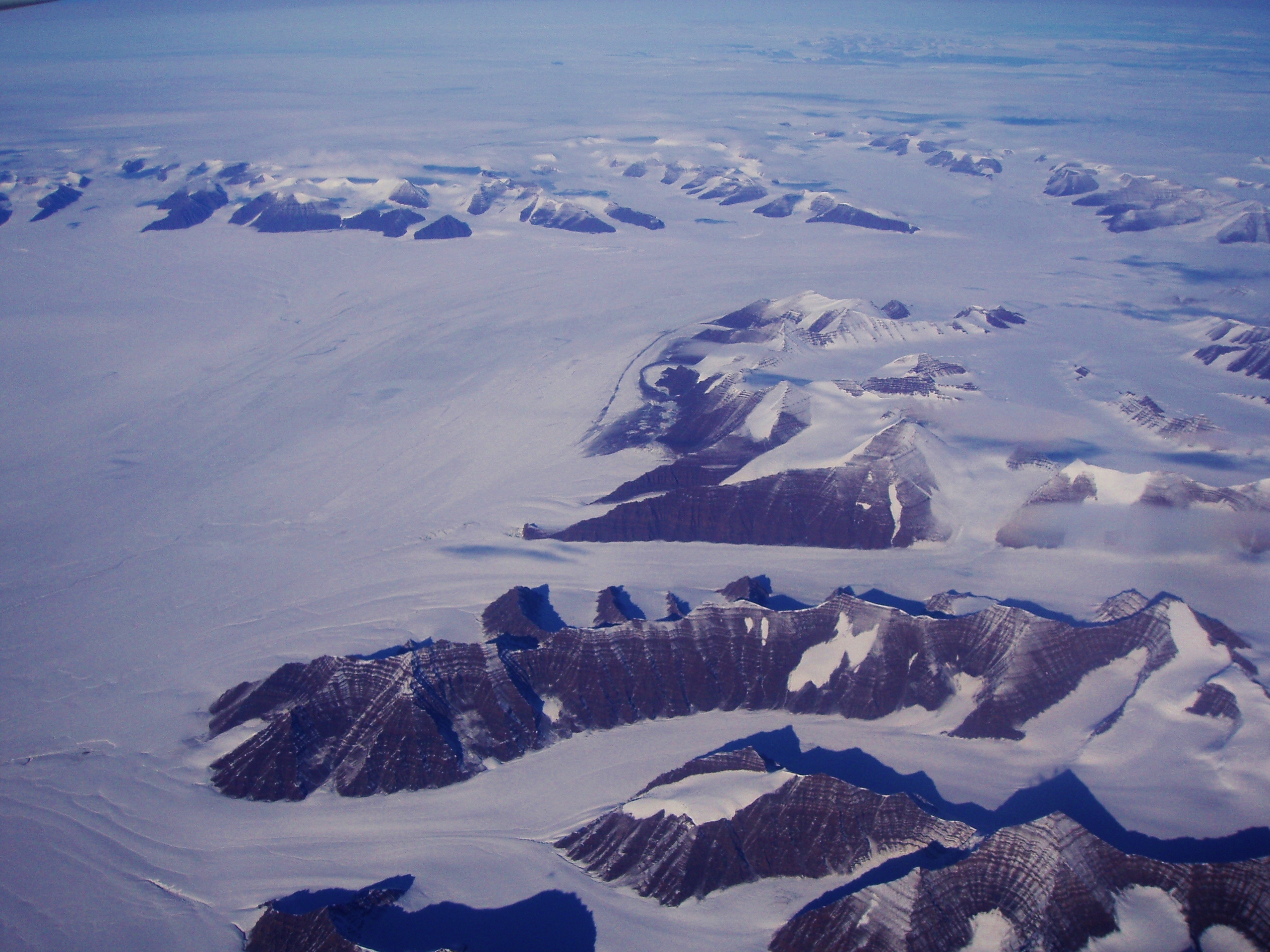
- The southward bend in the Christian IV Glacier with the Gronau Nunataks in the background and the NW part of the Watkins Range on the right.

- Location within Greenland
- Type: Valley glacier
- Location: Greenland
- Coordinates: 68°55′N 30°30′W
- Length: 177 km (110 mi)
- Terminus: Denmark Strait; North Atlantic Ocean

Christian IV Glacier (Danish: Christian IV Gletscher or Kong Christian den IV's Gletscher) is a large glacier on the east coast of the Greenland ice sheet. It is named after King Christian IV of Denmark (1577 – 1648). Administratively this glacier is part of the Sermersooq Municipality. The area surrounding Christian IV Glacier is uninhabited.

== Geography ==
The Christian IV Glacier is a non-surge type valley glacier that does not drain the ice sheet directly, but flows partly from it across the mountainous areas of the Gronau Nunataks through the Gronau Glacier and the Grønlands Styrelse Glacier tributaries. Further south it separates the Lindbergh Range in the west from the Watkins Range in the east, flowing in a roughly north–south direction until its terminus at the head of the Nansen Fjord in the East Greenland coast.

This fast-flowing glacier is similar in structure to the neighbouring Kronborg Glacier. It is one of the longest glaciers in Greenland, and with a width of up to 24 km (15 mi), it is comparable in approximate length and width to the Beardmore Glacier in Antarctica.

== See also ==
- List of glaciers in Greenland
