= Christopher Maitland Stocken =

English Lieutenant Commander of Royal Navy

Christopher Maitland Stocken, D.S.C., R.N. (Born Bristol 17 April 1922. Died eastern Greenland 23 August 1966). Lieut. Commander, Royal Navy. Led the R.N. expedition to East Greenland. An amateur botanist and a keen mountain climber.

== Background ==
He joined the navy in 1935, passing out at Dartmouth Royal Navy College in 1939. During World War II he was liaison officer with Yugoslav partisans and mentioned in despatches for a successful attack on heavily armed barges of the Istrian coast. He was awarded the Distinguished Service Cross in 1947 during the Palestine troubles. He was stationed in Gibraltar 1961-1965 where he explored the flora of Andalusia.

He was killed by a falling boulder when leading the R.N. expedition to East Greenland, and is buried in a crevasse with a memorial cairn at the Schweizerland base.

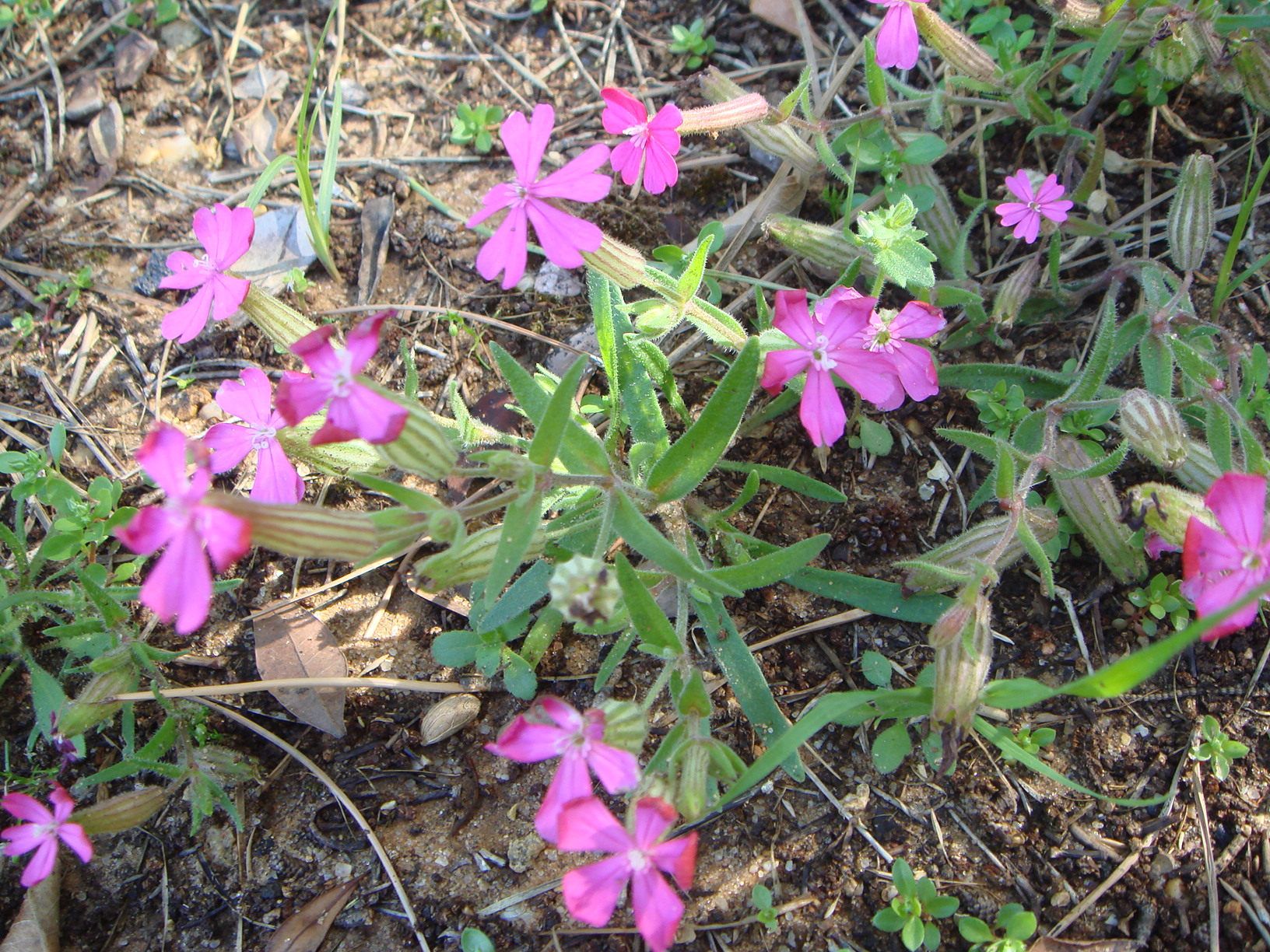
Silene stockenii

Commemorated by Silene stockenii Chater, which he had collected at Bornos, near Jerez. A mountain, Stockenbjoerg (66° 36' N 37° 10' W, 2520m altitude), in eastern Greenland is named after him as a memorial.

He was married in 1951 and had three children.

== Publications ==
"Andalusian Flowers and Countryside" (Published Privately (1969)).
