= Jules de Blosseville =

French naval officer, geographer and explorer

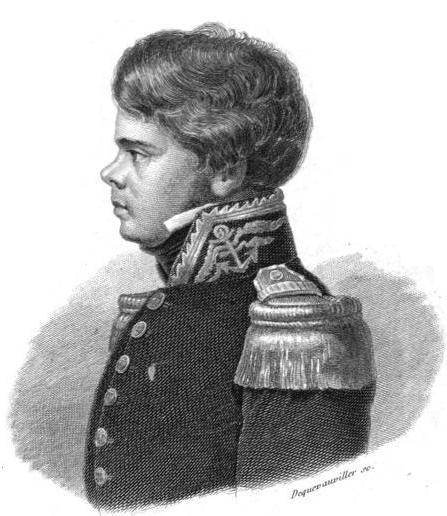
- Born: 29 July 1802; Rouen, France
- Died: August 1833; Near Greenland
- Military career
- Allegiance: Kingdom of France
- Branch: French Navy
- Service years: 1818–1833
- Rank: Lieutenant
- Commands: Lilloise
- Conflicts: Invasion of Algiers
- Other work: Explorer of the South Pacific

Jules Poret de Blosseville (French pronunciation: [ʒyl pɔʁɛ də blɔsvil]; 29 July 1802 – August 1833) was a French naval officer, geographer and explorer. Born in 1802, he joined the French Navy at the age of 16. From 1822 to 1825, he participated in an expedition that explored the South Pacific and, by its conclusion, circumnavigated the world. He disappeared in August 1833, while in command of his own expedition to the Arctic.

== Early life ==
Jules Poret de Blosseville was born on 29 July 1802 in Rouen, Normandy, the son of a vicomte. He had an older brother who later succeeded to the title. He was well educated with interests in astronomy and zoology. He joined the French Navy in 1818 and, as an officer, joined an expedition to the West Indies aboard the Railleur.

In August 1822, Blossville was selected as a midshipman on Louis Duperrey's expedition aboard La Coquille (Note: When Dumont d'Urville mounted his expedition in 1826, he was given the use of La Coquille but renamed it Astrolabe.) to explore the South Pacific. With Lieutenant Jules Dumont d'Urville, well known for his role in the discovery of the Venus de Milo statue, as second in command, it was intended to sail to several islands in the region, conducting hydrographical and ethnological surveys. Blosseville's berth on La Coquille was due to the influence of his father, who was acquainted with the Minister of the Navy, Duc de Clermont-Tonnerre.

== Exploring the Pacific ==
The expedition departed Toulon on 10 August 1822, making for South America. After stopping at Brazil and the Falkland Islands, the French rounded Cape Horn on 31 December 1822 and travelled along the coast to Peru, conducting hydrographic surveys. They reached Tahiti in May 1823, anchoring at Matavai Bay where Blosseville started his hydrographical surveying work. While at Tahiti, Blosseville became acquainted with Captain John Dibbs of the colonial barque Endeavour. With Dibbs, he sailed to Maupiti Island to map it for the expedition. While there he collected a bird specimen, the Maupiti Monarch, which was soon to become extinct. (Note: The Maupiti Monarch collected by Blosseville was later lost when sick members of the expedition being repatriated to France from Australia, and carrying several specimens with them, were shipwrecked.)

The expedition moved onto to Tonga, the Solomon Islands, Timor, and Australia, attained in January 1824. While at Sydney in Australia, Blosseville was invited by Sir Thomas Brisbane, the governor of New South Wales to work in his newly built observatory. They sailed onto New Zealand, arriving in the Bay of Islands in April 1824, where Blosseville undertook surveying work and explored the area inland. During his time in New Zealand, he met the Māori chief Hongi Hika and investigated the farming techniques of the colonists.

Leaving New Zealand on 17 April 1824, visits to the Gilbert and Ellice Islands, and the Carolines followed, including the discovery of the previously unmapped islands of Mokil and Losap before the expedition moved onto the Dutch East Indies. They began their way home in September 1824, reaching Marseille in March 1825, without having suffered any fatalities during the entire expedition. During the voyage, Duperrey named an island in the Schoutens, near New Guinea, for Blosseville although it is no longer known by this name.

Soon after the return of the expedition's return, d'Urville had submitted a proposal to journey around the world to the Minister of the Navy. This being accepted, he invited Blosseville to join him but was met with a refusal. Instead, Blosseville worked on a number of publications; he was a contributor to an atlas of landscapes and portraits, and wrote a report on New Zealand which was published in 1826, first as part of a periodical and then as a separate document. Further reports on the feasibility of a French colony in New Zealand followed, the last of which was published in 1829. He had already returned to sea by this time; in 1827, he had sailed to India and Burma aboard Chevrette as part of a scientific expedition and the following year, promoted to lieutenant, undertook a hydrographic expedition aboard the Alacrity, serving in the Mediterranean. He was present at the invasion of Algiers in 1830.

== Later life ==
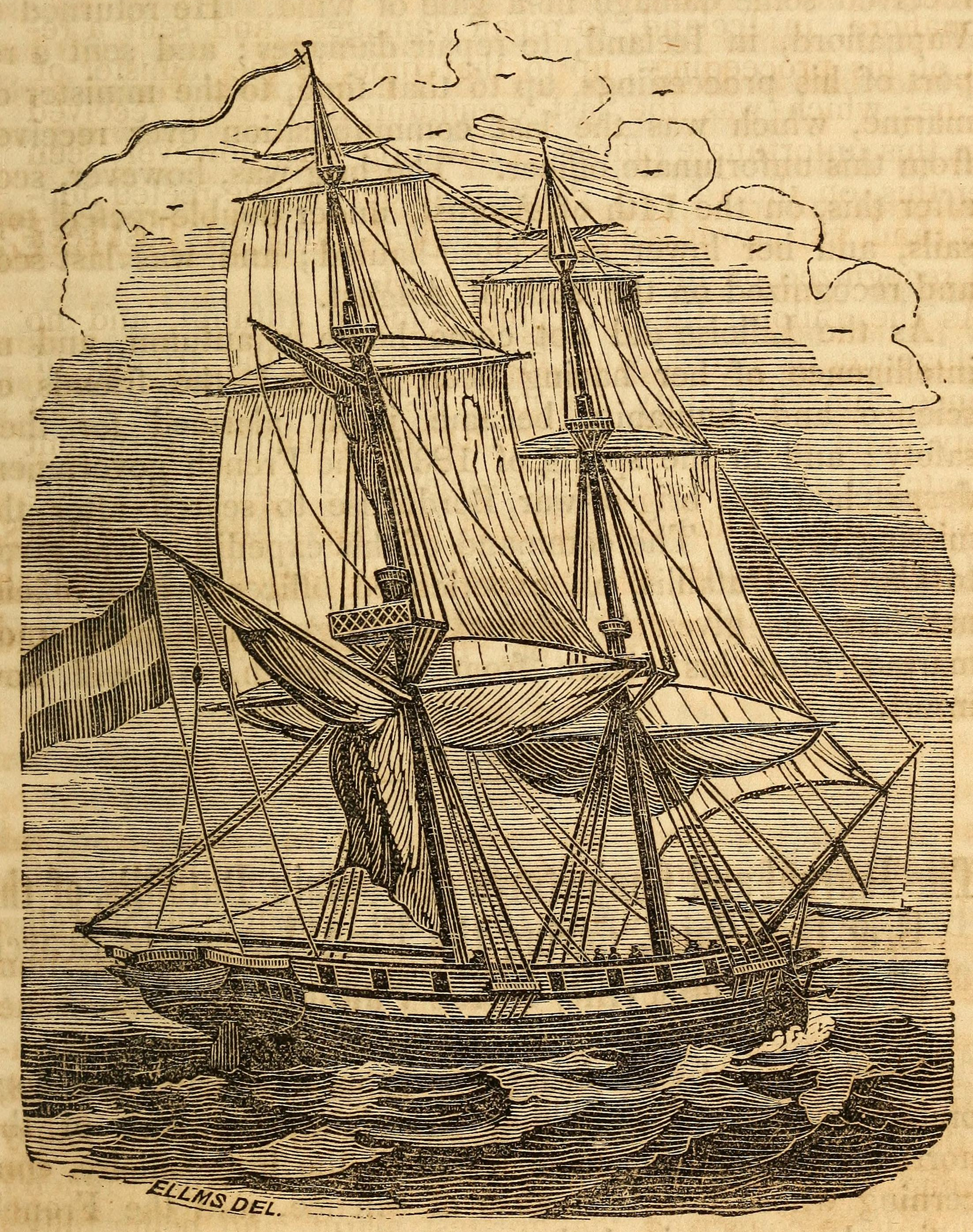
The French brig-of-war Lilloise

In 1833, Blosseville submitted a request to undertake an expedition exploring the Arctic, which was duly approved. He departed as commander of Lilloise and made his way to Greenland, where he carried out mapping along the east coast. His ship became damaged and he put into Iceland for repairs. Once this work was completed, he departed back to Greenland. His expedition then disappeared, its last known sighting being made on 15 August 1833. In the following years, three expeditions were mounted to find him and the 83 other men of his command but no trace was found. In January 1846, it was reported that the Lilloise had been wrecked on Vanikoro, in the Solomon Islands. This report was later dismissed as having been made in error, given the last sighting of Lilloise and the supposed location of the wreck.

Blosseville is commemorated in the name of the Blosseville Coast, a portion of the southeast coastline of Greenland, from between Kangerlussuaq Fjord and Cape Brewster. His brother, a historian, later wrote a biography of him.

== See also ==
- European and American voyages of scientific exploration

== Notes ==
Footnotes

Citations
