= King Christian IX Land =

King Christian IX Land Kong Christian IX Land
- Region
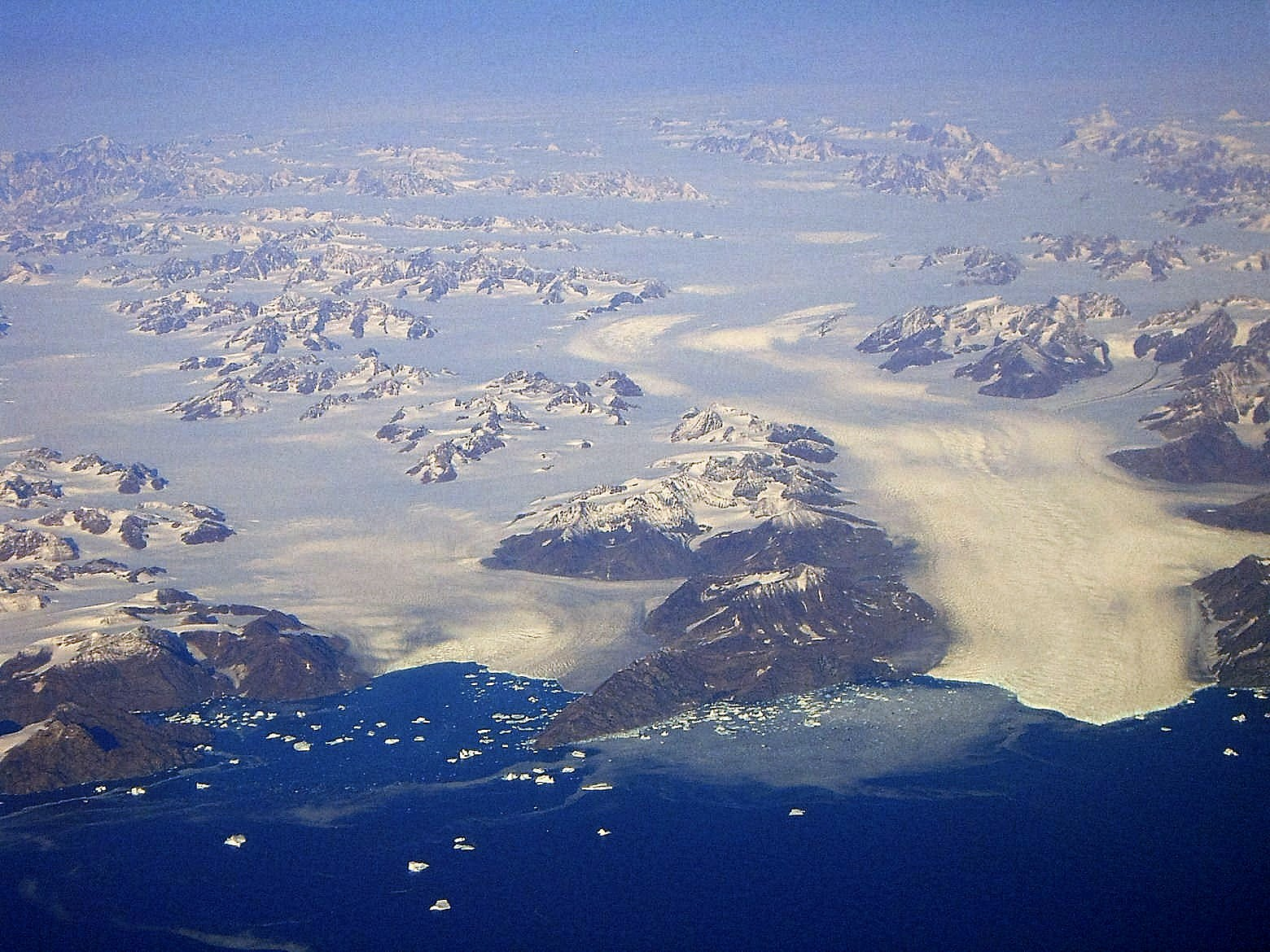
- View of the two K.J.V. Steenstrup Glaciers reaching the ocean south of Ikertivaq Fjord.

- Location of King Christian IX Land
- Coordinates: 67.5°N 32.6°W
- Country: Greenland
- Elevation: 800 m (2,600 ft)

King Christian IX Land (Danish: Kong Christian IX Land) is a coastal area of Southeastern Greenland in Sermersooq Municipality fronting the Denmark Strait and extending through the Arctic Circle from 65°N to 70°N.

== History ==
This area was named in September 1884 by Gustav Frederik Holm who claimed it for Denmark, naming it after the then-reigning Danish King Christian IX.

== Geography ==
King Christian IX Land is bordered by King Frederick VI Coast on the south, King Christian X Land and the Scoresby Sound to the north, and the Greenland Ice Sheet to the west. Greenland's highest mountain range, the Watkins Range, as well as the nearly as high Schweizerland are located in this region.

The shore area of King Christian IX Land includes the Blosseville Coast to the east. There are many fjords, the largest of which are Sermilik, Kangerlussuaq and Kangertittivatsiaq, as well as numerous coastal islands, including Ammassalik which is the site of the most populous town in Eastern Greenland, Tasiilaq. On the coast itself there are some small settlements, such as Sermiligaaq, but areas far from the coast are uninhabited.

== Image gallery ==
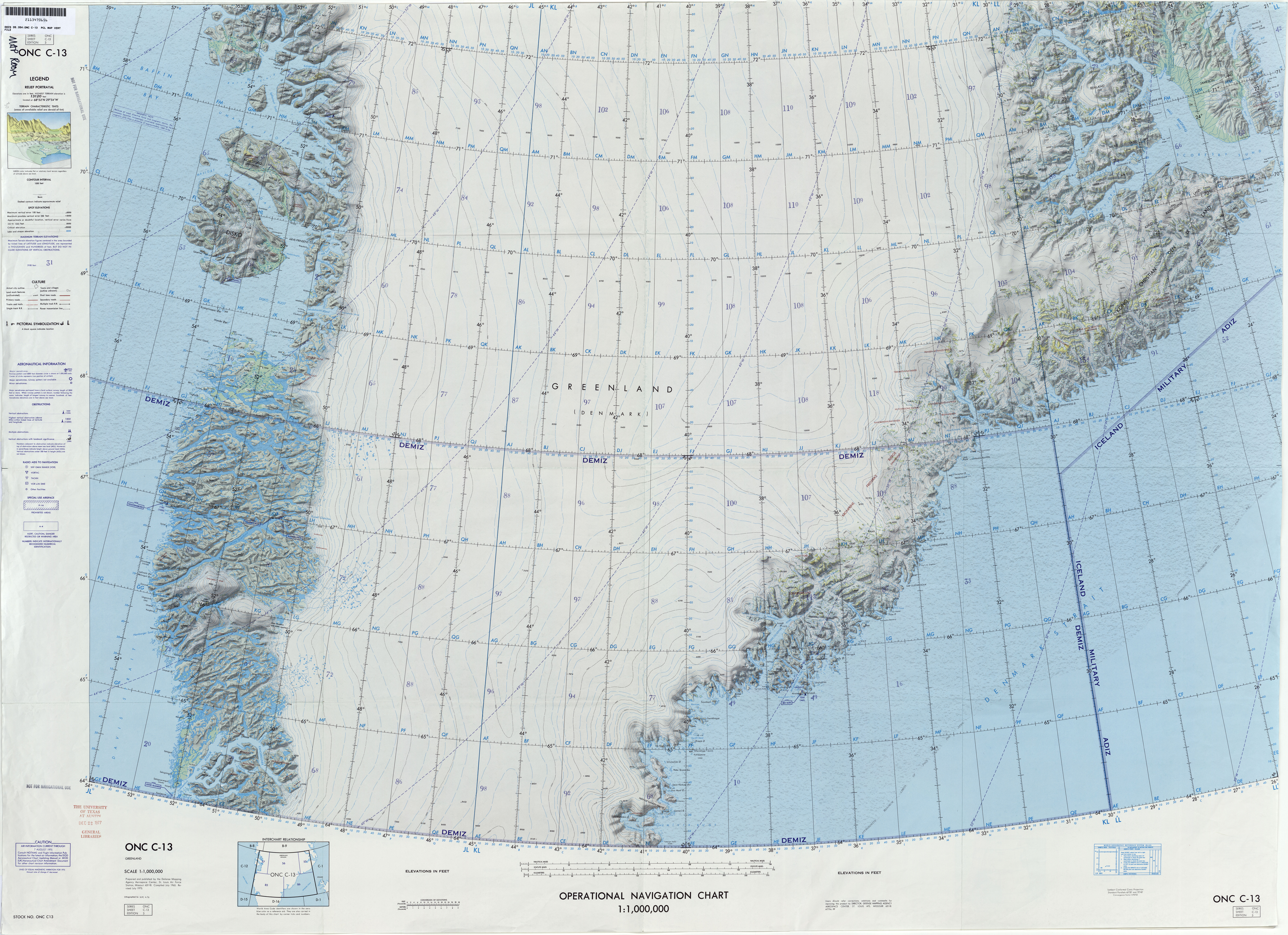
Map of Greenland section.

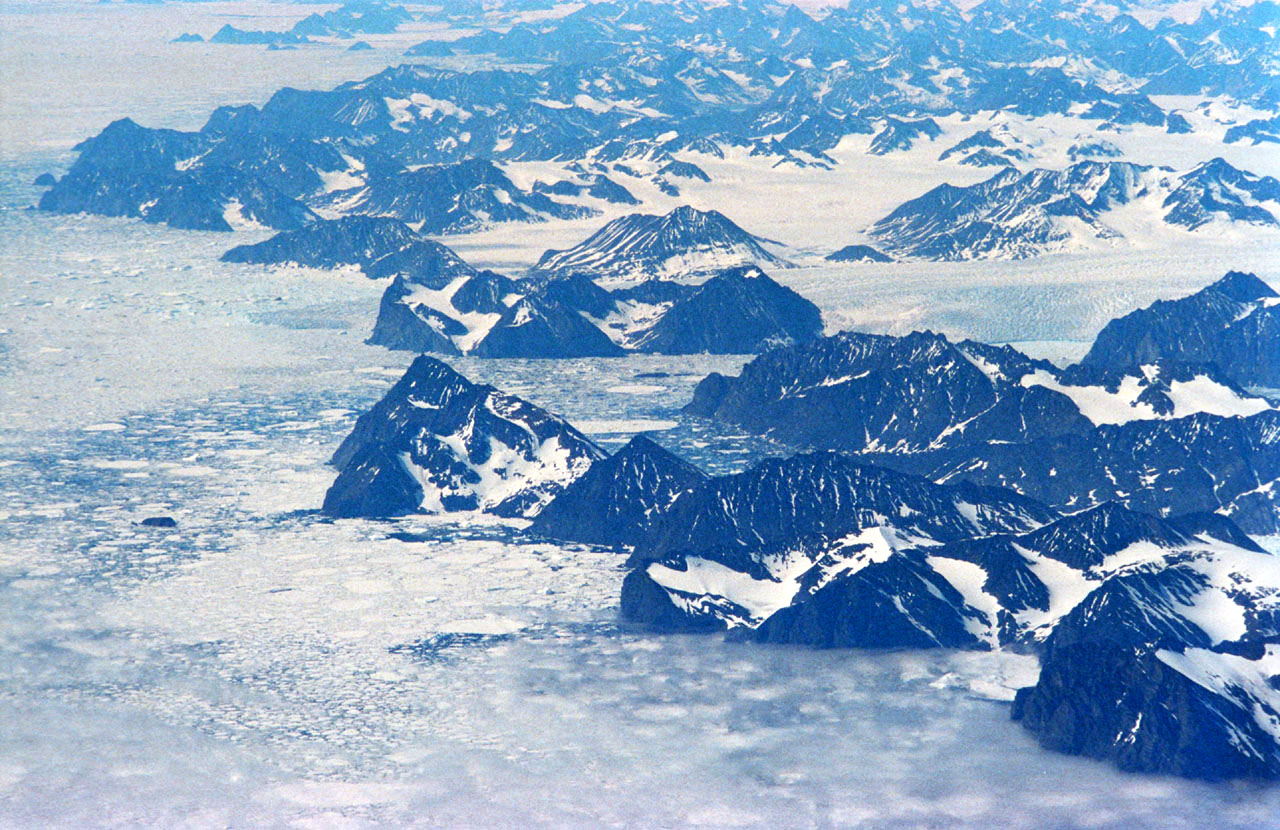
Coastal landscape of King Christian IX Land near Ammassalik.
