= Hamberg Glacier (Greenland) =

Glacier in Greenland

- Hamberg Gletscher
- Location within Greenland
- Type: Piedmont glacier
- Location: Greenland
- Coordinates: 73°33′N 29°38′W
- Length: 50 km (31 mi)
- Terminus: Gerard de Geer Glacier; Isfjord; Kaiser Franz Joseph Fjord; Greenland Sea

Map of Northeastern Greenland

Hamberg Glacier (Danish: Hamberg Gletscher) is one of the major glaciers in King Christian X Land, Northeast Greenland. Administratively it lies in the Northeast Greenland National Park zone.

The area where the glacier flows is remote and uninhabited.

== History ==
This glacier was first mapped in 1932 by Lauge Koch during the Three-year Expedition to East Greenland. It was named after Swedish mineralogist, geographer and Arctic explorer Axel Hamberg (1863–1933).

== Geography ==
The Hamberg Glacier flows from the eastern side of the Greenland ice sheet in the west and swings to the NE to join Gerard de Geer Glacier. To the northwest of the bend lies J. L. Mowinckel Land. To the SE the glacier has a branch joining the Jaette Glacier.

The Evers Glacier flows about 10 km (6.2 mi) to the north and the Victor Madsen Glacier about 25 km (16 mi) to the southeast. Louise Boyd Land lies to the east of the eastern section of the glacier and Fraenkel Land further to the southeast.

There is a small region of nunataks off the upper western section of the glacier.

== See also ==
- List of glaciers in Greenland
