= Andrée Land (Greenland) =

Peninsula in King Christian X Land, East Greenland

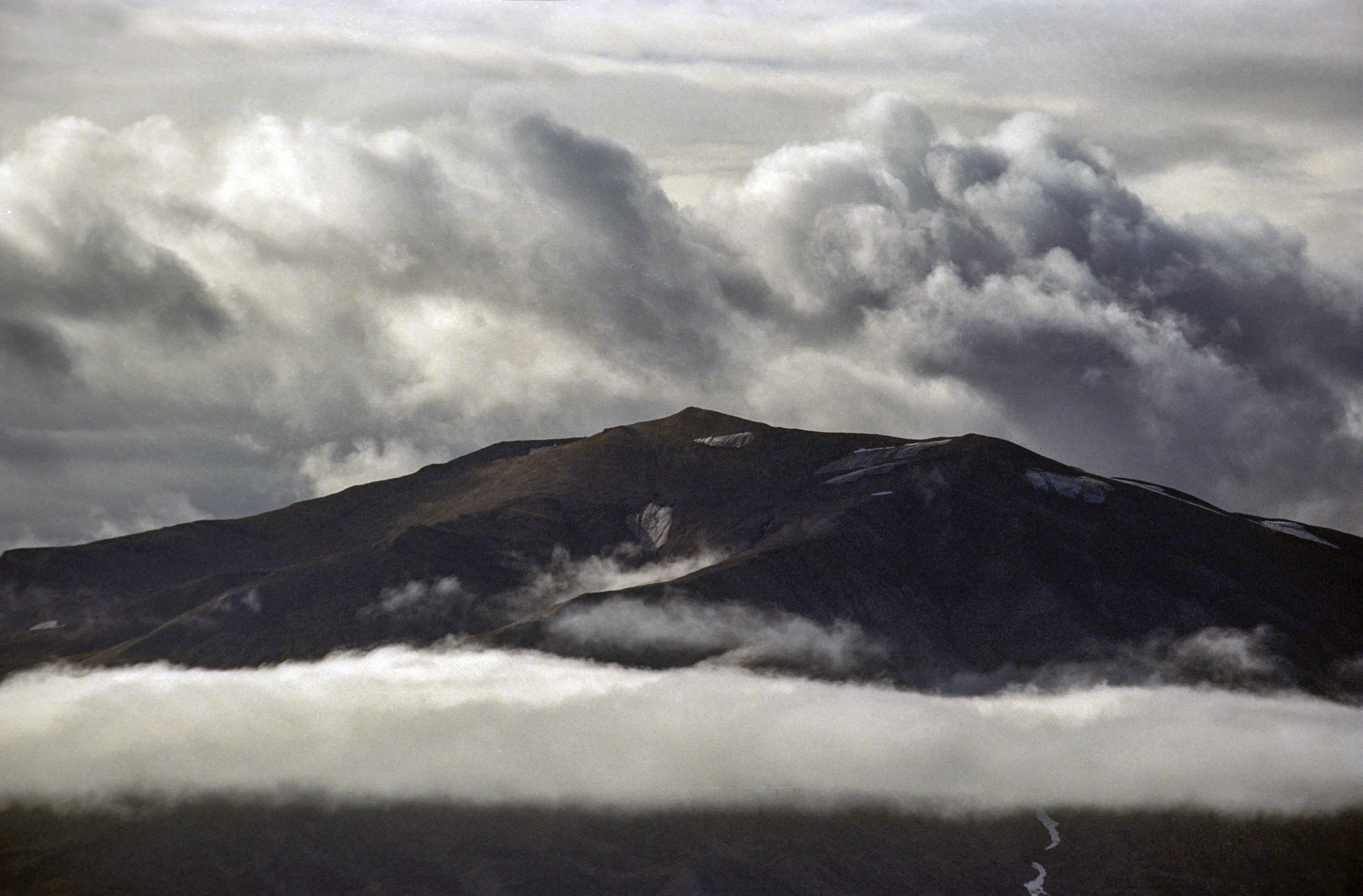
- Mountain summits and clouds in Andrée Land

- Location within Greenland

Geography
- Location: East Greenland
- Coordinates: 73°35′N 26°00′W
- Adjacent to: Kaiser Franz Joseph Fjord; Ijsfjord and Geologfjord
- Length: 85 km (52.8 mi)
- Width: 63 km (39.1 mi)
- Highest elevation: 2,360 m (7740 ft)
- Highest point: Margaretatop

Administration
- Greenland (Denmark)
- Zone: NE Greenland National Park

Andrée Land is a peninsula in King Christian X Land, East Greenland that is bounded by Kejser Franz Joseph Fjord, Isfjord and Geologfjord.

== History ==
The peninsula was named by A.G. Nathorst on his 1899 expedition after Swedish Arctic explorer Salomon August Andrée, who had made an attempt to reach the North Pole by balloon in 1897. One of the aims of Nathorst's 1899 venture was to search for traces of the lost Andrée's Arctic Balloon Expedition, whose fate was unknown until 1930, when it became known that Andrée had crash-landed on the pack ice and died on Kvitøya.

The region was later visited and accurately mapped during Lauge Koch's expeditions to East Greenland.

== Geography ==
Andrée Land is located about 100 km inland from the Foster Bay of the Greenland Sea. It is bound by Kaiser Franz Joseph Fjord in the southeast, and two branches of it, the Isfjord —beyond which lies Fraenkel Land— in the SW and the Geologfjord, beyond which lies Strindberg Land, in the east. Small and rocky Bjorne Island (Bjørneø) is located off the easternmost end of Andrée Land, north of Cape Weber.

The peninsula is attached to the mainland on its northwestern side, with the Gerard De Geer Glacier in its western boundary, beyond which lies Louise Boyd Land in the west and J. L. Mowinckel Land in the northwest. The Adolf Hoel Glacier flows in the north and the Nunatak Glacier in the northeast. A number of valleys cut across the peninsula; the most important are the Grejsdal in the middle, the Eremitdal further north and the Rendal in the west.

=== Mountains ===
Andrée Land is mountainous. The highest point is 2,360 m (7,740 ft) high Margaretatop, also known as Margarita Spids, located in the southern part. The Lacroix Mountains (Lacroix Bjerge) are a mountain range at the SW end rising above the Isfjord. Arnold Escher Land is a nunatak group to the NW of Andrée Land. Some of the other noteworthy peaks are:

- Aappalaatsiaq (1,998 m)
- Agardh Bjerg (1,820 m)
- Ajorpoq (1,498 m)
- Alpebjerg (2,052 m)
- Devil's Castle (Teufelsschloss) (1,303 m). Located at the SE end of Andrée Land on the fjord shore, opposite Cape Petersens, the NW extremity of Ymer Island.
- Djævleborg (1,800 m)
- Knivbjerg (1,987 m)
- Marcia Bjerg (1,460 m)
- Målebjerg (1,842 m)
- Mørkebjerg (1,497 m)
- Tårnfjeld (2,163 m)

Map of Northeastern Greenland.

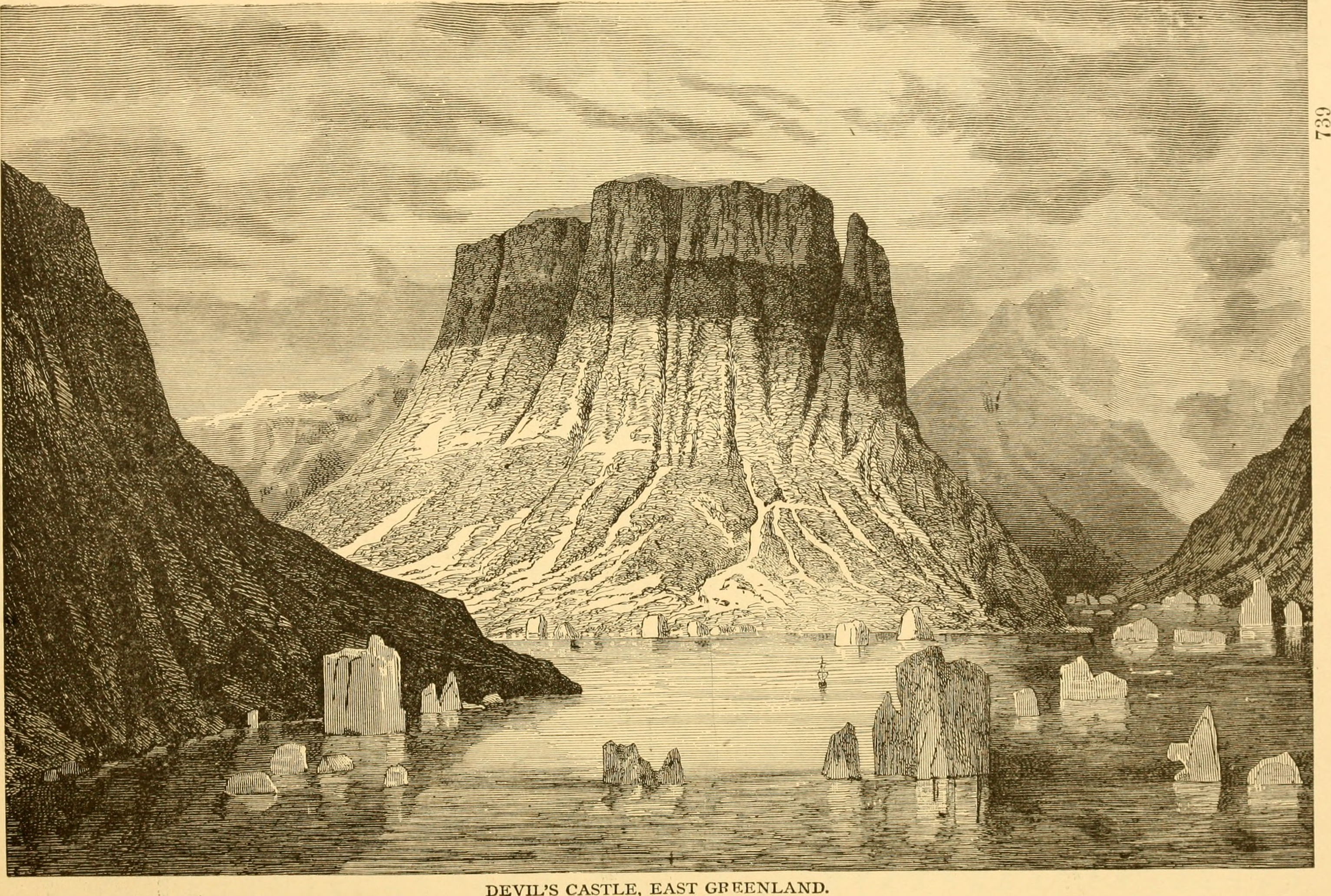
1882 artist's impression of the Teufelsschloss, a prominent mountain of reddish rock with a lighter stripe extending diagonally across its face.

== See also ==
- Cartographic expeditions to Greenland
- Frænkel Land
- List of mountains in Greenland
