= Kjerulf Fjord =

Fjord in Greenland

- Location in Greenland
- Location: Arctic
- Coordinates: 73°0′N 27°23′W
- Ocean/sea sources: Kaiser Franz Joseph Fjord; Greenland Sea
- Basin countries: Greenland
- Max. length: 25 km (16 mi)
- Max. width: 3 km (1.9 mi)

Kjerulf Fjord is a fjord in King Christian X Land, eastern Greenland.

The Kjerulf Fjord is part of the Kaiser Franz Joseph Fjord system. Administratively it lies in the area of the Northeast Greenland National Park.

== History ==
There are Inuit ruins at a place named Paradisdal. Excavations were conducted by James Wordie at the time of the 1929 Cambridge Expedition to East Greenland. There are also scattered remains of the now extinct East Greenland reindeer in the form of antlers and bones.

The fjord was first mapped by Julius Payer during the 1869–1870 Second German North Polar Expedition led by Carl Koldewey (1837–1908). It was named after Norwegian geologist Theodor Kjerulf (1825–88), founder of the Geological Survey of Norway in 1858. There were errors in Payer's map, which were later corrected by Alfred Gabriel Nathorst (1850–1921). Josef Hammar was the first to reach the head of the fjord by canoe in 1899. Louise Boyd noted the large amount of massive stranded icebergs in the fjord during an exploration in 1931.

== Geography ==
This fjord is the innermost tributary of Kaiser Franz Joseph Fjord. Its mouth opens to the north on the southern shore of the main fjord, only about 7 km (4.3 mi) east of the terminus of the Nordenskiöld Glacier (Akuliarutsip Sermerssua) at its head. The fjord runs in a roughly north/south direction for over 25 km (16 mi). The fjord separates Goodenoughland in the west from Suess Land in the east.

Kjerulf Fjord is about 3 kilometres (1.9 mi) wide in the mouth area, narrowing to an average of less than 2 kilometres (1.2 mi) in the inner reaches. Ridderborgen (Knight Mountain), a 1,885 m (6,184 ft) high peak topped by a rock pinnacle resembling a ruined castle, rises on the west side of the mouth area of the fjord. The landscape of the inner fjord, with grass-covered slopes and valleys, such as Paradisdal, is more gentle than the shoreline of inner Kaiser Franz Joseph Fjord with its forbidding dark cliffs. Kjerulf Fjord has been described as an "iceberg graveyard", for many glaciers originating in the Isfjord to the north, end up stranded here driven by the wind and currents.

The head is located in the isthmus area of Suess Land, only about 6 kilometres (3.7 mi) north of the head of Dickson Fjord. There are mudflats at the head and a few minor glaciers such as the Passage Glacier flow into the fjord and the Hisinger Glacier flows to the south and SW of the mudflats.

Map of Northeastern Greenland

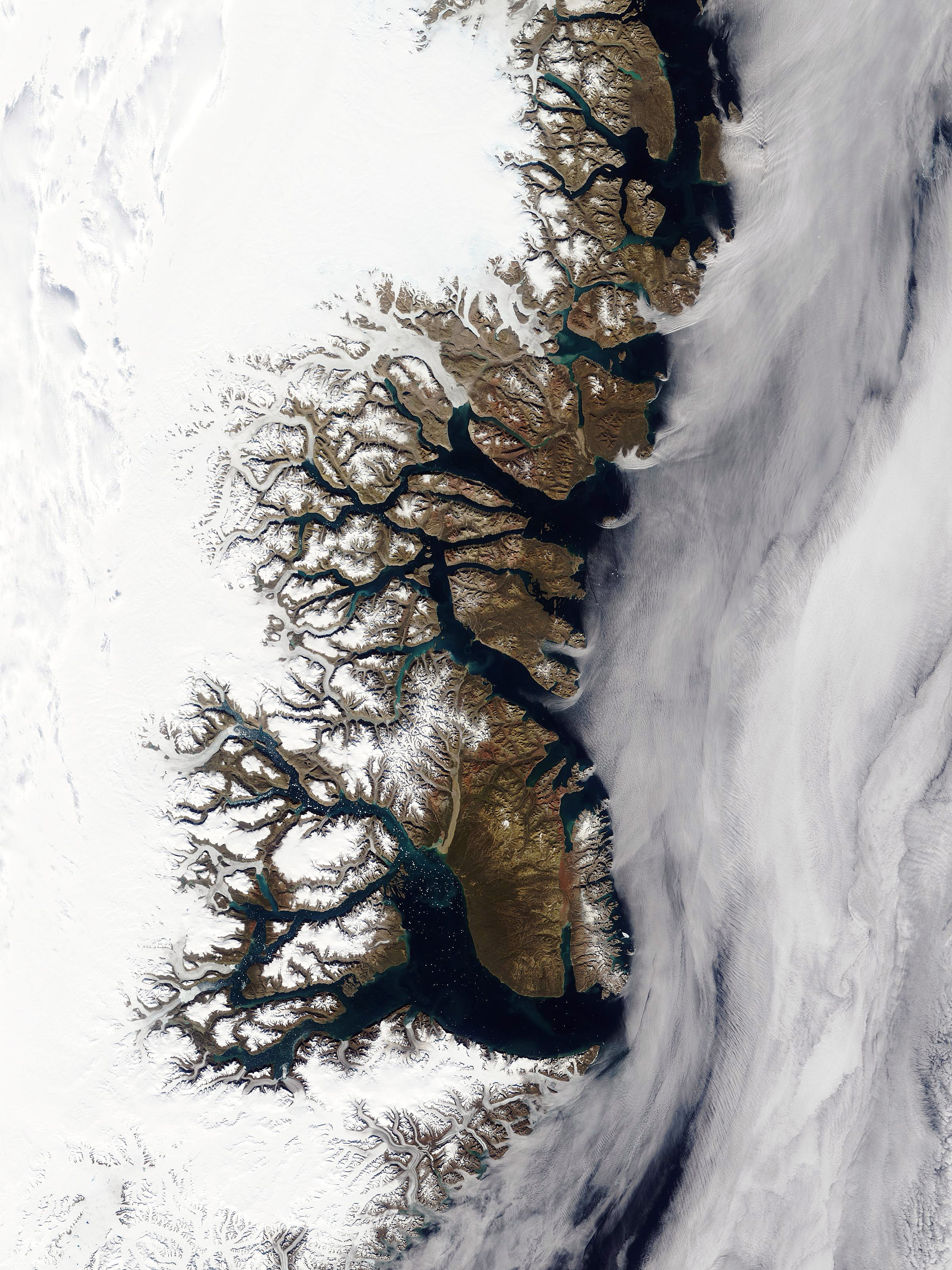
East Greenland Terra/MODIS satellite image

== See also ==
- List of fjords of Greenland
