= Adolf Hoel Glacier =

Glacier in Greenland

- Adolf Hoels Gletscher
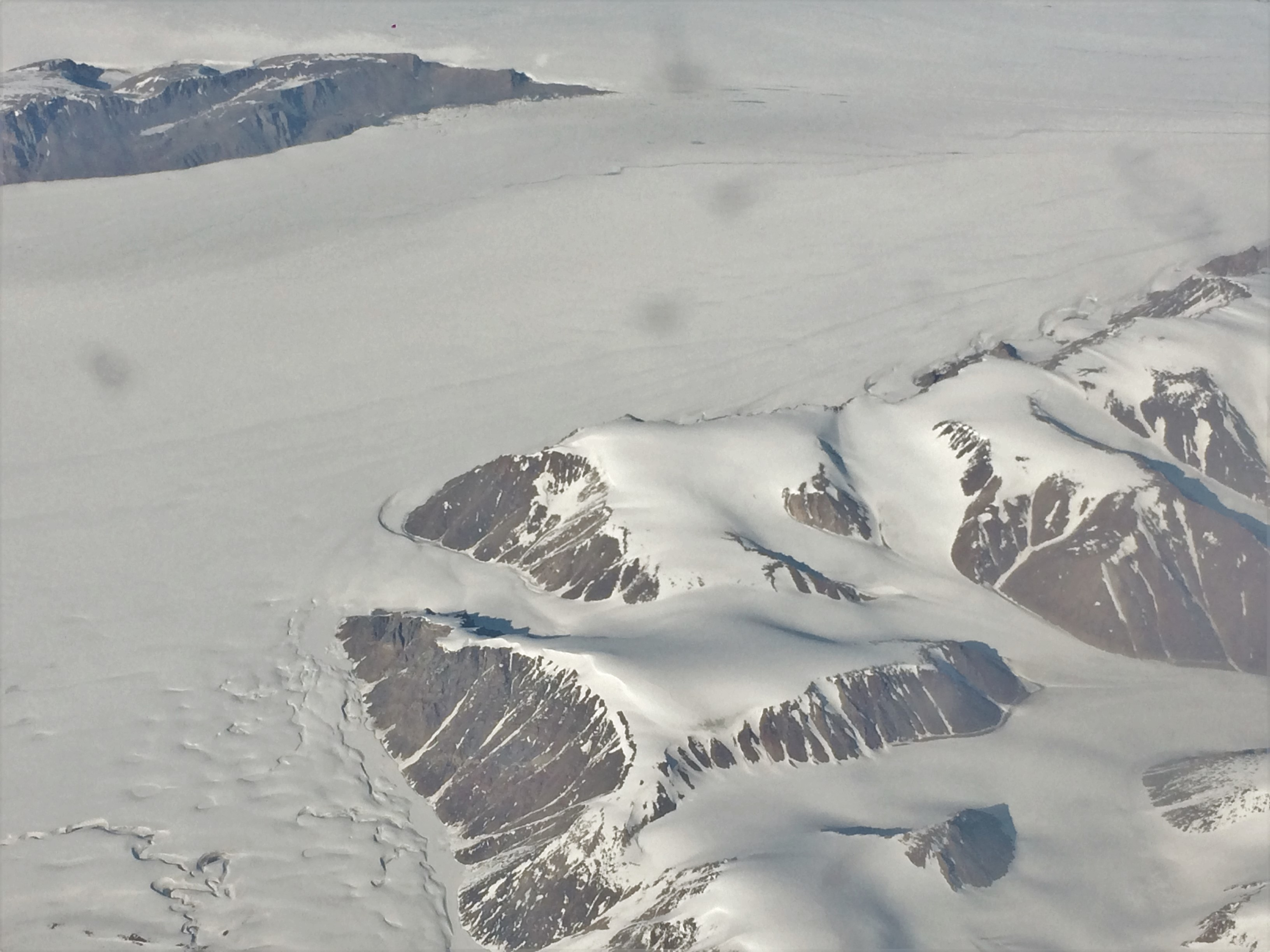
- View of the Adolf Hoel Glacier

- Location within Greenland
- Type: Piedmont glacier
- Location: Greenland
- Coordinates: 74°0′N 26°45′W
- Length: 45 km (28 mi)
- Width: 7 km (4.3 mi)
- Terminus: Nunatak Glacier; Geologfjord; Kaiser Franz Joseph Fjord; Greenland Sea

Adolf Hoel Glacier (Danish: Adolf Hoels Gletscher), also known as Hoel Glacier (Hoels Gletscher), is one of the major glaciers in King Christian X Land, Northeast Greenland. Administratively it lies in the Northeast Greenland National Park zone.

The area where the glacier flows is remote and uninhabited.

== History ==
This glacier was first mapped in 1931 by the Høygaard and Mehren expedition. It was named after Adolf Hoel (1863–1933), Norwegian geologist and chairman of the Arctic Trading Co.

== Geography ==
The Adolf Hoel Glacier originates in the eastern side of the Greenland ice sheet around the area of Hobb Land, with J. L. Mowinckel Land to the south and Arnold Escher Land to the north. It is joined by the Skråbræ from the north. Then it flows along the northern edge of Andrée Land in a roughly WNW/ESE direction until its terminus in the Nunatak Glacier to the east. It has a flow of 0.3 km (0.19 mi) per year.

The Eyvind Fjeld Glacier flows to the north and the Wilkins Nunataks rise to the NW. The Jakob Kjøde Bjerg, a large 1,850 m (6,070 ft) high nunatak, rises off the northeastern side of the glacier, beyond which flows the Waltershausen Glacier.

Map of Northeastern Greenland

== Bibliography ==
- A. K. Higgins, Jane A. Gilotti, M. Paul Smith (eds.), The Greenland Caledonides: Evolution of the Northeast Margin of Laurentia.

== See also ==
- List of glaciers in Greenland
