= Celsius Bjerg Formation =

Geologic formation in Greenland

- Stratigraphic range: Devonian
- Type: Formation

Location
- Country: Greenland

Type section
- Named for: Celsius Bjerg, Ymer Island

The Celsius Bjerg Formation is a geologic formation in Greenland. It preserves fossils dating back to the Devonian period.

== See also ==
- List of fossiliferous stratigraphic units in Greenland
