= Nunatak (disambiguation) =

A nunatak is an exposed peak projecting through an ice field or glacier.

Nunatak may also refer to:

- Nunatak (band), band comprising members of the British Antarctic Survey, who represented Antarctica at Live Earth in 2007
- Nunatak Glacier, NE Greenland
- Nunatak Island, an island in Nunavut, Canada
