= Louise Boyd Land =

- Region
- Location of Louise Boyd Land
- Coordinates: 73.5°N 28.3°W
- Country: Greenland
- Zone: Northeast Greenland National Park

Dimensions
  - Length: 60 km (37 mi)
  - Width: 40 km (25 mi)
- Elevation: 2,399.99 m (7,874.0 ft)

Population
  - Total: Uninhabited

Louise Boyd Land is an area in King Christian X Land, Eastern Greenland. Administratively it lies in the Northeast Greenland National Park zone. The area is remote and uninhabited.

Louise Boyd Land was first surveyed by Lauge Koch from the air in 1932 during the Three-year Expedition to East Greenland. It was named after American Arctic explorer Louise Boyd (1887–1972).

== Geography ==
Louise Boyd Land is a mountainous region. It is bound to the northwest, north and east by the Gerard de Geer Glacier. Beyond the glacier to the northwest lies J. L. Mowinckel Land. In the southeast it is bound by the Isfjord, a branch of Kaiser Franz Joseph Fjord, beyond which lies Andrée Land. To the south it is separated from Fraenkel Land by the Jætte Glacier. To the west lies the Hamberg Glacier and a region of numerous nunataks, and beyond them the Greenland ice sheet.

The highest mountain of Louise Boyd Land is marked as a 7,874-foot-high (2,400 m) peak in the Defense Mapping Agency Greenland Navigation charts.

Among the glaciers in Louise Boyd Land the Evers Glacier and the Victor Madsen Glacier deserve mention.

Map of Northeastern Greenland

== Bibliography ==
- A. K. Higgins, Jane A. Gilotti, M. Paul Smith (eds.), The Greenland Caledonides: Evolution of the Northeast Margin of Laurentia.
