= Margaretatop =

Mountain in eastern Greenland

- Location within Greenland

Highest point
- Elevation: 2,360 m (7,740 ft)
- Coordinates: 73°23.1′N 26°13.3′W

Geography
- Location: Andrée Land (Greenland)

Margaretatop is a mountain in eastern Greenland. Administratively it is part of the Northeast Greenland National Park.

== History ==
At the time of Lauge Koch's 1949–51 expeditions this summit was named after Margareta Hediger by American geologist John Haller, a Fellow of the Geological Society of America.

The peak is marked as "Margaretatopp" and "Margarita Spids" in some maps. Margaretasø is a small lake in neighboring Rendal at 73°25.5′N 26°39.0′W where the reflection of the mountain can be seen on its surface. This lake was named by John Haller after the same person.

== Geography ==
Margaretatop is the highest point of Andrée Land.

It is a roughly 2,360 m (7,740 ft) high peak that rises in the southwestern part of Andrée Land, east of the Rendal valley and northeast of the shore of the Isfjord, a northern branch of Kaiser Franz Joseph Fjord. This mountain is marked as a 7,743-foot-high (2,360 m) peak in the Defense Mapping Agency Greenland Navigation charts.

Map of Northeastern Greenland

== See also ==
- List of mountains in Greenland
