= Akuliarutsip Sermerssua =

Glacier in Greenland

- Nordenskiöld Glacier
- Location within Greenland
- Location: Greenland
- Coordinates: 73°3′N 28°13′W
- Area: 62,647 km (38,927 mi)
- Terminus: Kaiser Franz Joseph Fjord; Greenland Sea

Akuliarutsip Sermerssua, also known as Nordenskiöld Glacier (Danish: Nordenskiöld Gletscher), is a large glacier located on the east coast of Greenland.

== Geography ==
This glacier flows into the head of the Kaiser Franz Joseph Fjord, just 7 km (4.3 mi) west of the mouth of Kjerulf Fjord, and marks the southern limit of Frænkel Land and the northern of Goodenoughland. Petermann Peak, one of the highest mountains in Greenland, and the highest in the area, rises to a height of 2,943 metres (9,656 ft) on a nunatak rising right by the northern side of the fjord.

The Nordenskiöld Glacier flows roughly in a WSW/ENE direction, draining an area of 62,647 km (38,927 mi) of the Greenland Ice Sheet with a flux (quantity of ice moved from the land to the sea) of 10.7 km^{3} (2.6 cu mi) per year, as measured for 1996.

== See also ==
- List of glaciers in Greenland
