= Dusen Fjord =

Fjord in Greenland

- Dusén Fjord
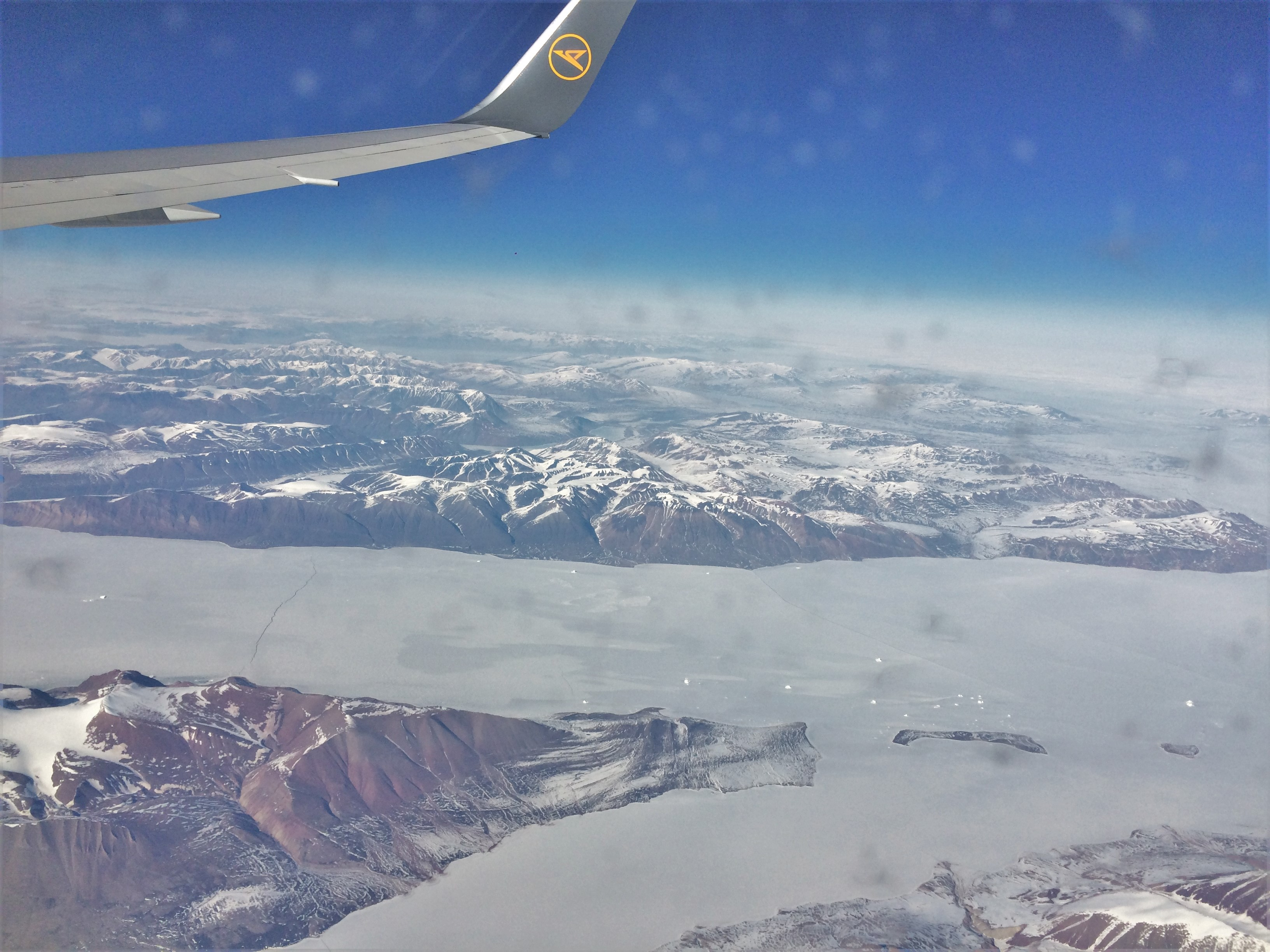
- View of the confluence of Dusen Fjord (bottom) with the Kaiser Franz Joseph Fjord (top).

- Location within Greenland
- Location: NE Greenland
- Coordinates: 73°14′N 24°0′W
- Ocean/sea sources: Kaiser Franz Joseph Fjord; Greenland Sea
- Basin countries: Greenland
- Max. length: 60 kilometres (37 mi)
- Max. width: 4 kilometres (2.5 mi)

Dusen Fjord or Dusén Fjord is a fjord in the NE Greenland National Park area, East Greenland.

== History ==
The fjord was named in 1899 by Swedish Arctic explorer A.G. Nathorst during the expedition he led to Greenland. It was named after Per Dusén, who surveyed the mouth of the fjord. The exploration, however, was incomplete and the fjord would only be thoroughly surveyed years later by Lauge Koch and by the NSIU (Norges Svalbard og Ishavsundersøkelser).

Promoted by the Arctic Trading Co., towards 1928 a number of cabins were built by the shores of this fjord, where the Norwegians had their hunting areas and fishing grounds.

== Geography ==
The Dusen Fjord is part of the Kaiser Franz Joseph Fjord system. It cuts deep into Ymer Island, almost dividing it in two, separating Gunnar Anderson Land in the north, from the southern part of the island. The fjord runs roughly from west to east for about 60 kilometres (37 mi). Its mouth opens to the east just south of the entrance of Kaiser Franz Joseph Fjord, near Foster Bay. Noa Lake is a small lake at the head of the fjord in the isthmus area.

The Vinter Islands lie east of Cape Graah, on the northern side of the fjord's mouth. Cape Wijkander is the headland on the southern side of the mouth.

Map of Northeastern Greenland

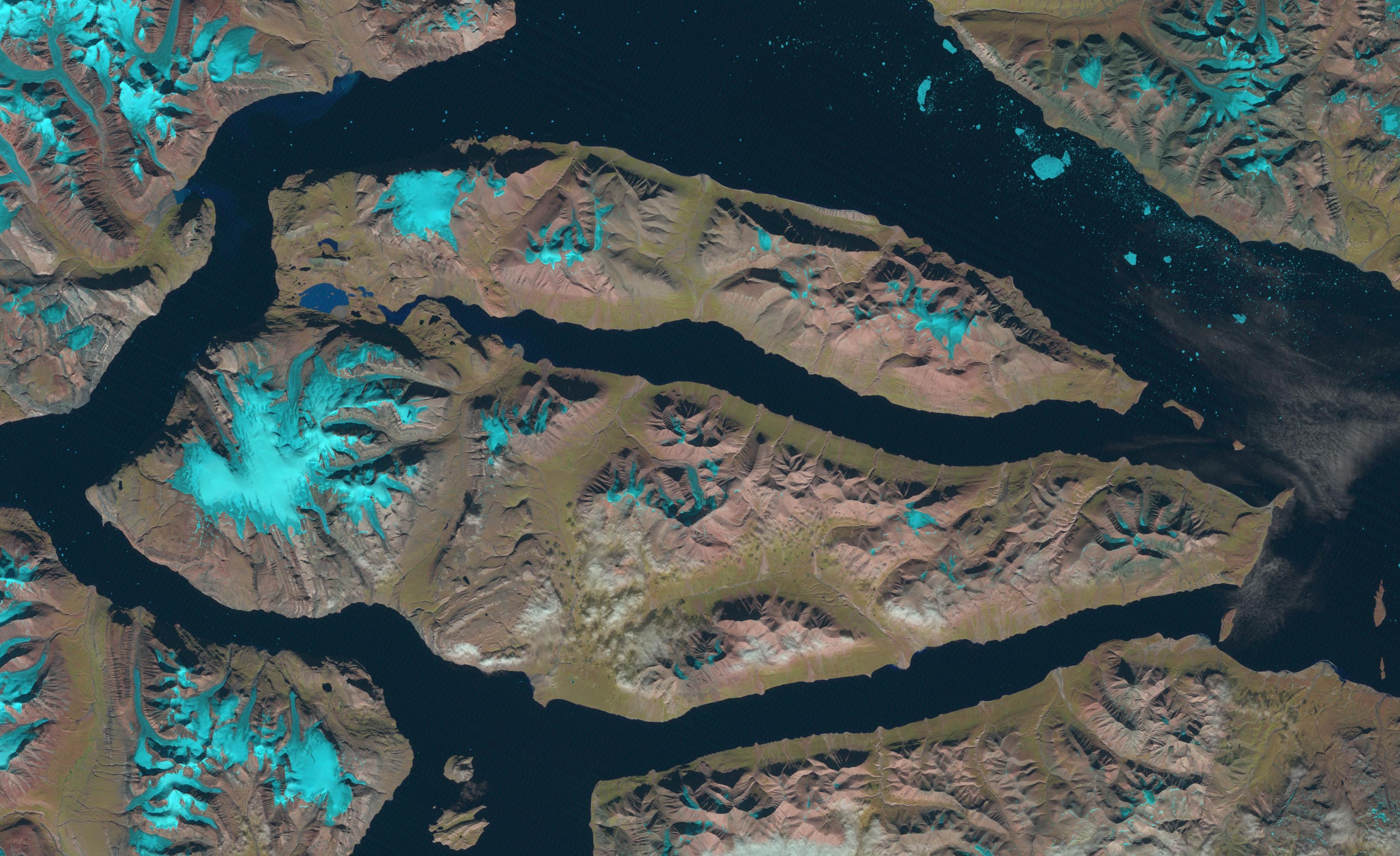
Ymer Island Landsat satellite image

== See also ==
- List of fjords of Greenland
