= Devil's Castle =

Mountain in Northeast Greenland National Park, Greenland

Teufelsschloss
- Devil's Castle
- Location within Greenland

Highest point
- Elevation: 1,303 m (4,275 ft)
- Prominence: 1,303 m (4,275 ft)
- Coordinates: 73°22′19″N 25°29′27″W

Geography
- Location: NE Greenland National Park, Greenland

The Devil's Castle (German: Teufelsschloss) is a conspicuous mountain rising above the Kaiser Franz Joseph Fjord at the SE end of Andrée Land in eastern Greenland. The feature is within the boundaries of Northeast Greenland National Park, the largest park on earth.

== Geography ==
The Devil's Castle is a prominent mountain of reddish rock with a lighter stripe extending diagonally across its face. It is located within the Kaiser Franz Joseph Fjord about 100 km from the mouth, close to the southern side of Cape Petersens, the northwestern extremity of Ymer Island. It rises steeply from the shore of the first bend of the fjord, south of Eleonore Bay.

The striking mountain was named Teufelschloss ("Devil's Castle" or "Devil's Palace") by the second German North Polar Expedition, led by Carl Koldewey, that first surveyed and partially explored the Kaiser Franz Joseph Fjord in 1869–70.

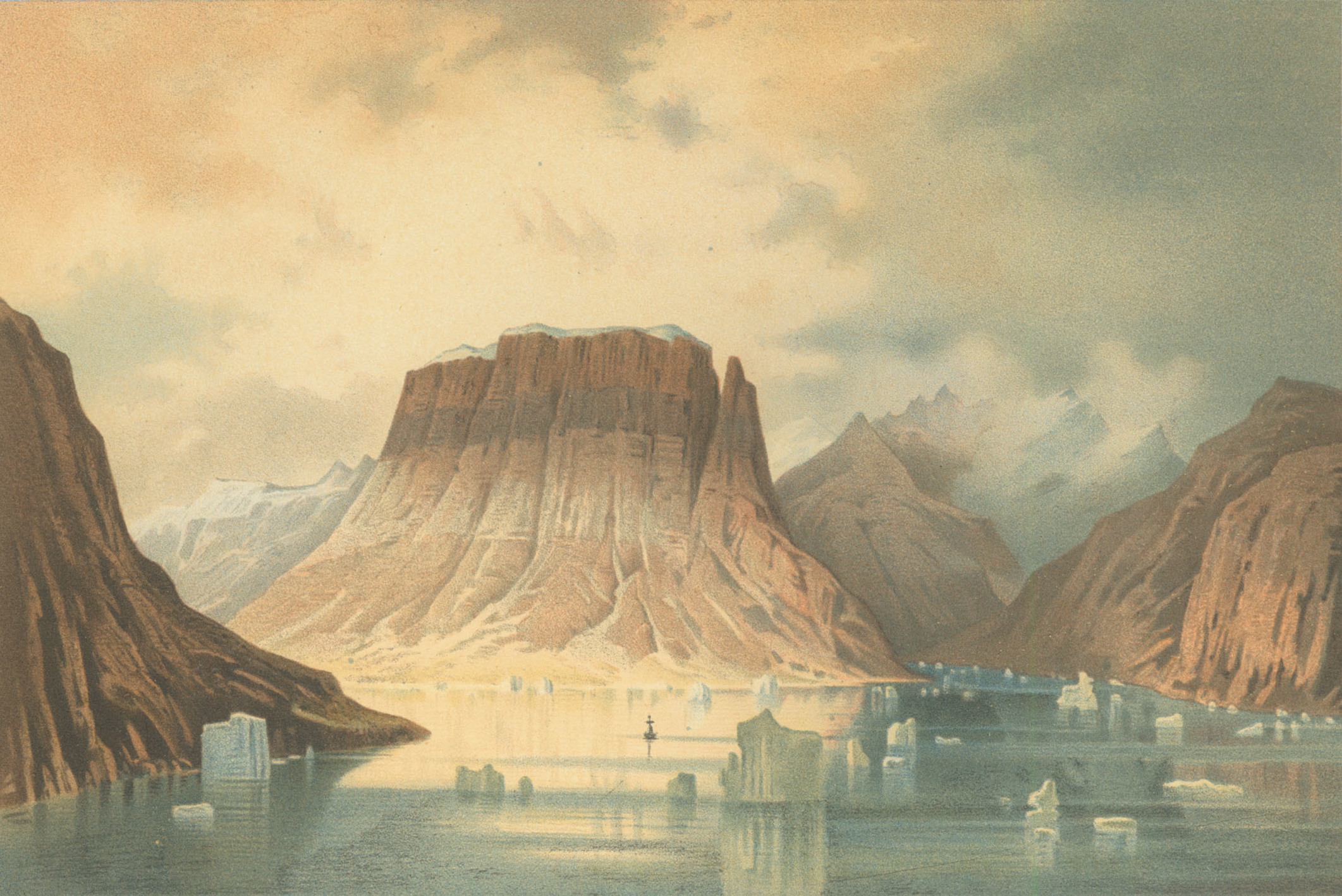
Teufelsschloss. By an unknown artist after drawings and descriptions made by members of the German North Polar expedition.

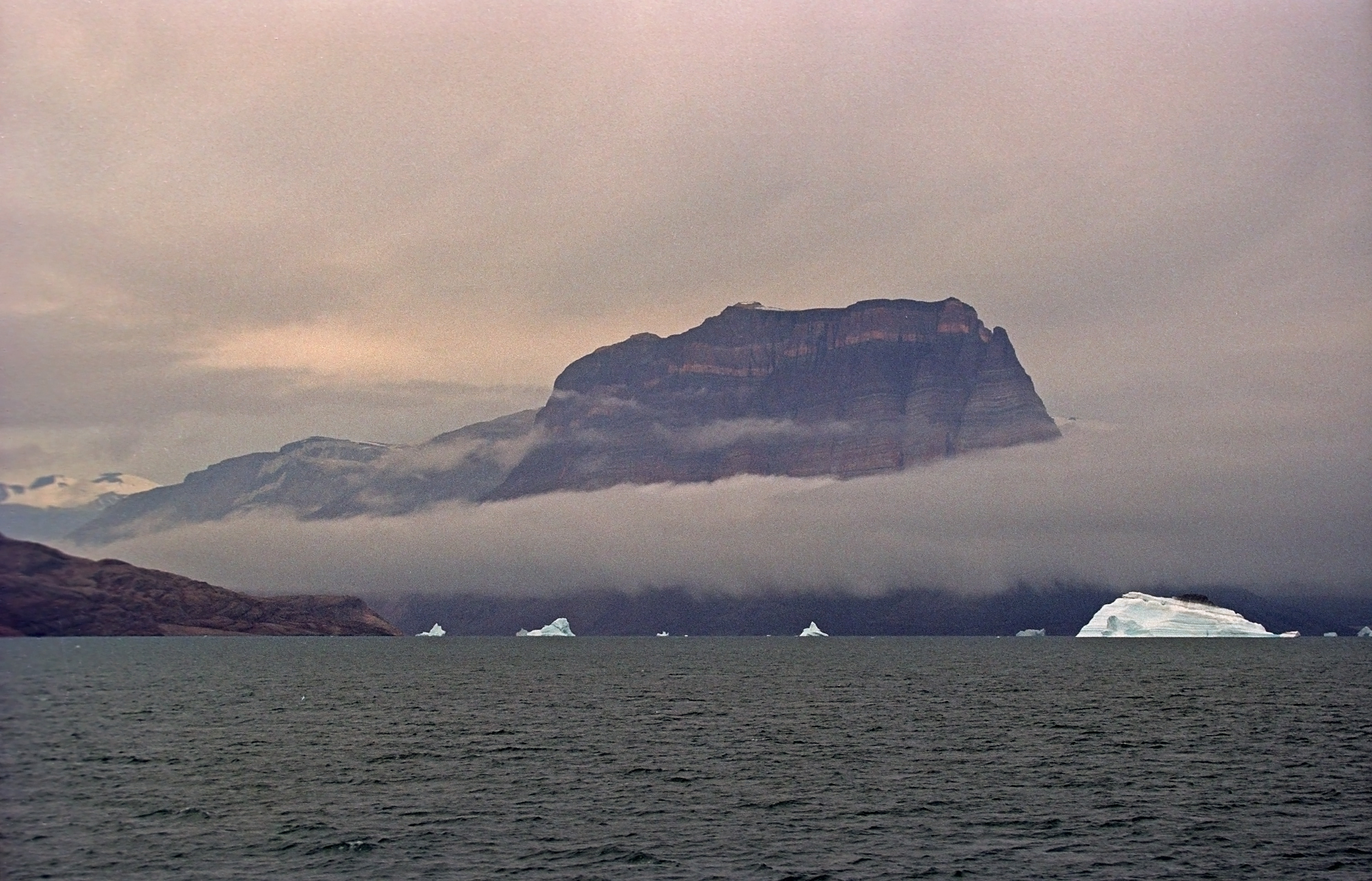
Twilight view of Kaiser Franz Josef Fjord with ice floes and the Teufelsschloss in the background.

== See also ==
- List of mountains of Greenland
