= Bjorne Island =

Island in Greenland

Bjørneø
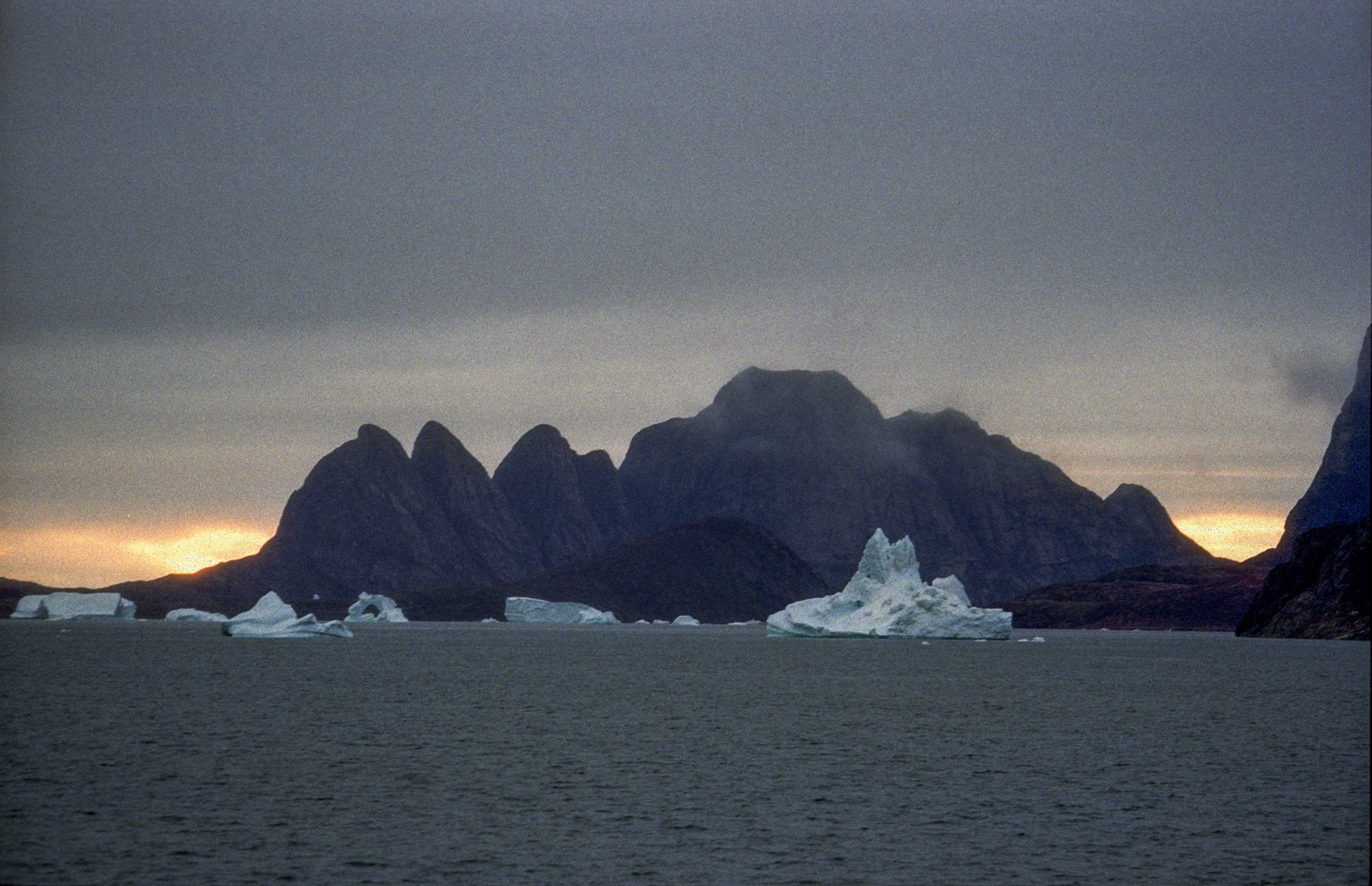
- View of Bjorne Island.

- Location within Greenland

Geography
- Location: Geologfjord; Kaiser Franz Joseph Fjord
- Coordinates: 73°33′N 24°43′W
- Major islands: 1
- Area: 28 ha (69 acres)
- Length: 0.6 km (0.37 mi)
- Width: 0.5 km (0.31 mi)

Administration
- Greenland
- Zone: Northeast Greenland National Park

Demographics
- Population: 0

Bjorne Island, Danish: Bjørneø, meaning 'Bear Island', is an island in NE Greenland. Administratively it belongs to the Northeast Greenland National Park.

It is the only island in the inner Kaiser Franz Joseph Fjord system.

== History ==
This island was first mapped and named Björnön by Alfred Gabriel Nathorst in 1899 during the Swedish Greenland Expedition in search of survivors of S. A. Andrée's Arctic balloon expedition of 1897.

== Geography ==
Bjorne Island is located in the middle of Geologfjord about 5 km (3.1 mi) from its mouth. It is a rocky islet, rising north of Cape Weber, the easternmost end of Andrée Land. The island is about 0.5 km (0.31 mi) in length.

Map of Northeastern Greenland.

== See also ==
- List of islands of Greenland
