= Ymer (journal) =

- Discipline: Physical geography, human geography, economic geography
- Language: Swedish

Publication details
- History: 1881–present
- Publisher: Swedish Society for Anthropology and Geography (Sweden)
- Frequency: Annually

Standard abbreviations
- ISO 4: Ymer

Indexing
- CODEN: YMERAD
- ISSN: 0044-0477
- LCCN: 67056600
- OCLC no.: 499863962

Links
- Journal homepage

Ymer is an annual peer-reviewed academic journal published by the Swedish Society for Anthropology and Geography. It was established in 1881 and published quarterly until 1965, when it converted to an annual rhythm. The journal is abstracted and indexed in Scopus.

Ymer Island is named after the journal, which had published many accounts of Swedish expeditions to Spitsbergen and Greenland.
