= Geologfjord =

Fjord in Greenland

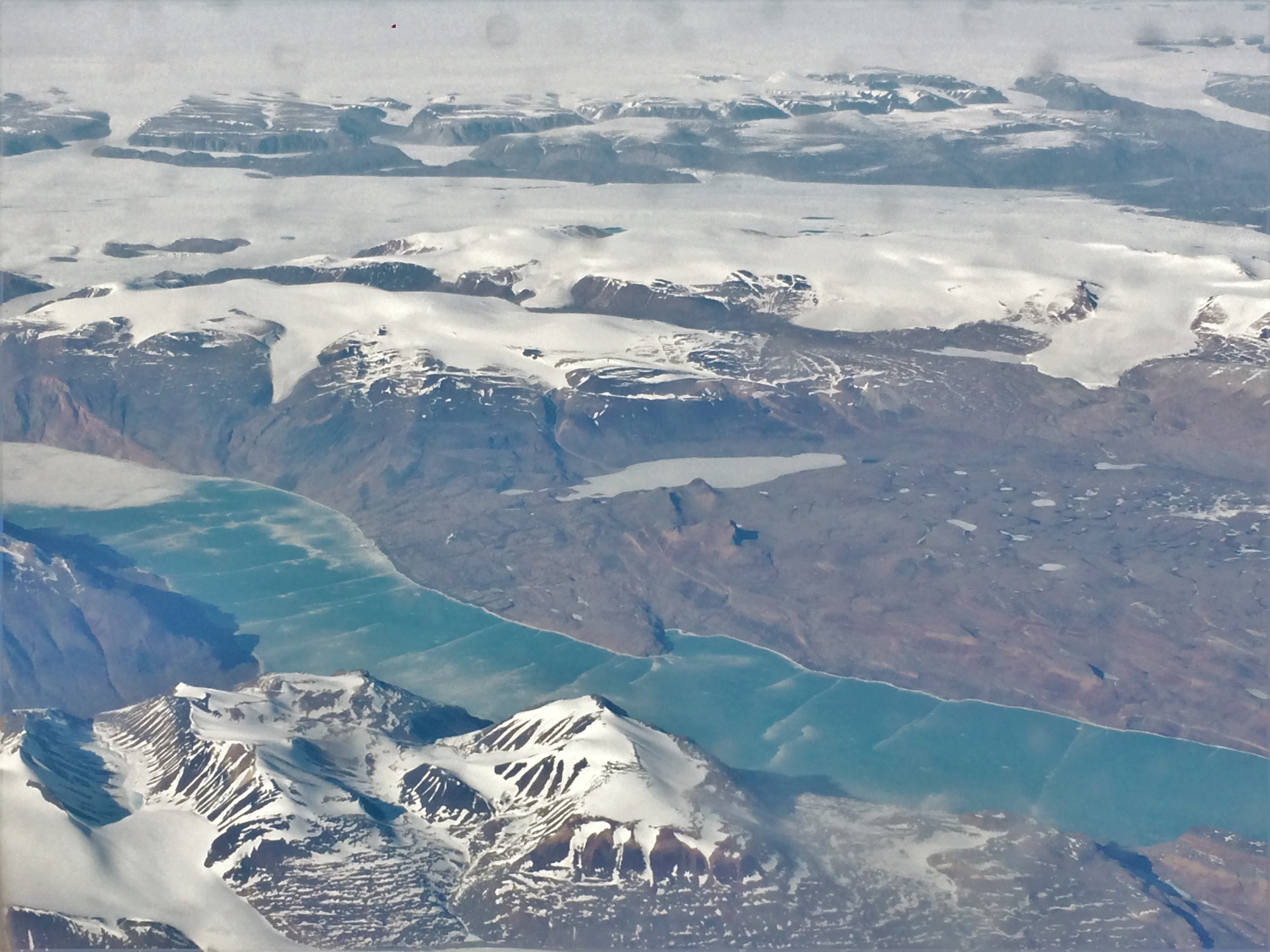
- View of Geologfjord.

- Location within Greenland
- Location: NE Greenland
- Coordinates: 73°45′N 24°15′W
- Ocean/sea sources: Kaiser Franz Joseph Fjord; Greenland Sea
- Basin countries: Greenland
- Max. length: 80 kilometres (50 mi)
- Max. width: 3 kilometres (1.9 mi)
- Settlements: 0

Geologfjord is a fjord in King Christian X Land, East Greenland. Administratively it belongs to the Northeast Greenland National Park.

== History ==
The fjord was named in 1899 by Swedish Arctic explorer and geologist A.G. Nathorst during the expedition he led to Greenland in search of survivors of S. A. Andrée's Arctic balloon expedition of 1897. The name was chosen owing to the spectacularly colored strata and rock formations in the shores of the fjord.

== Geography ==
The Geologfjord is part of the Kaiser Franz Joseph Fjord complex. It is a narrow and winding fjord located between mountains rising up to 2,100 metres (6,900 ft) on both sides, with cliffs displaying beautifully colored strata. It runs roughly in a NW /SE direction with Andrée Land to the west and Strindberg Land to the east. The Nunatak Glacier has its terminus at its head. The smaller Endeløs and Dukke Glacier flow into the fjord from the west.

Bjorne Island, a rocky islet, rises close to the mouth of the fjord, north of Cape Weber, the easternmost end of Andrée Land. To the south the fjord opens into the northern shore of the Kaiser Franz Joseph Fjord and Cape Ovibos is the headland at the eastern side of the entrance.

Map of Northeastern Greenland.

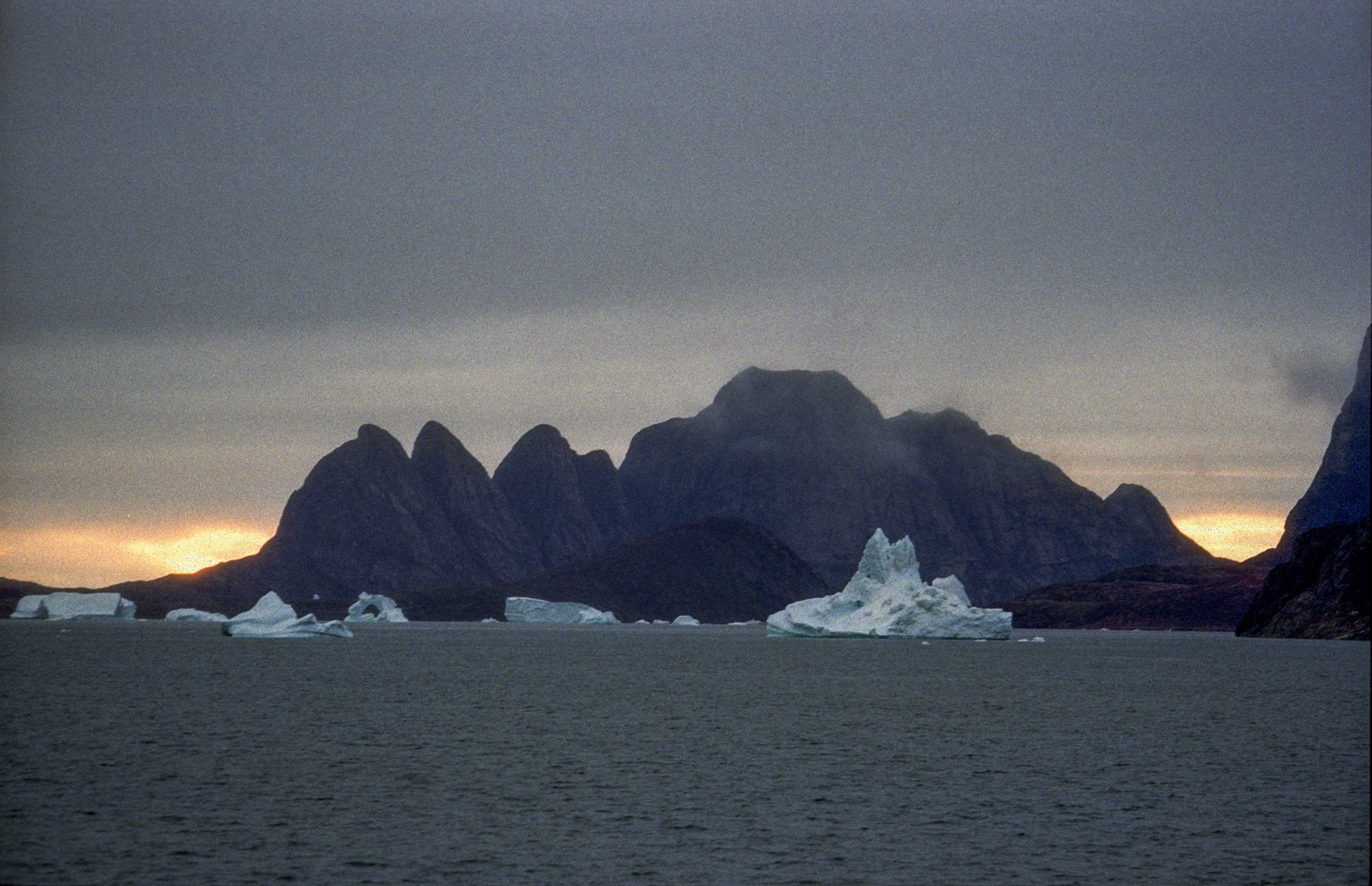
View of Bjorne Island.

== See also ==
- List of fjords of Greenland

== Bibliography ==
- Spencer Apollonio, Lands That Hold One Spellbound: A Story of East Greenland, 2008
