= Nunatak Glacier =

Glacier in Greenland

- Nunatakgletscher
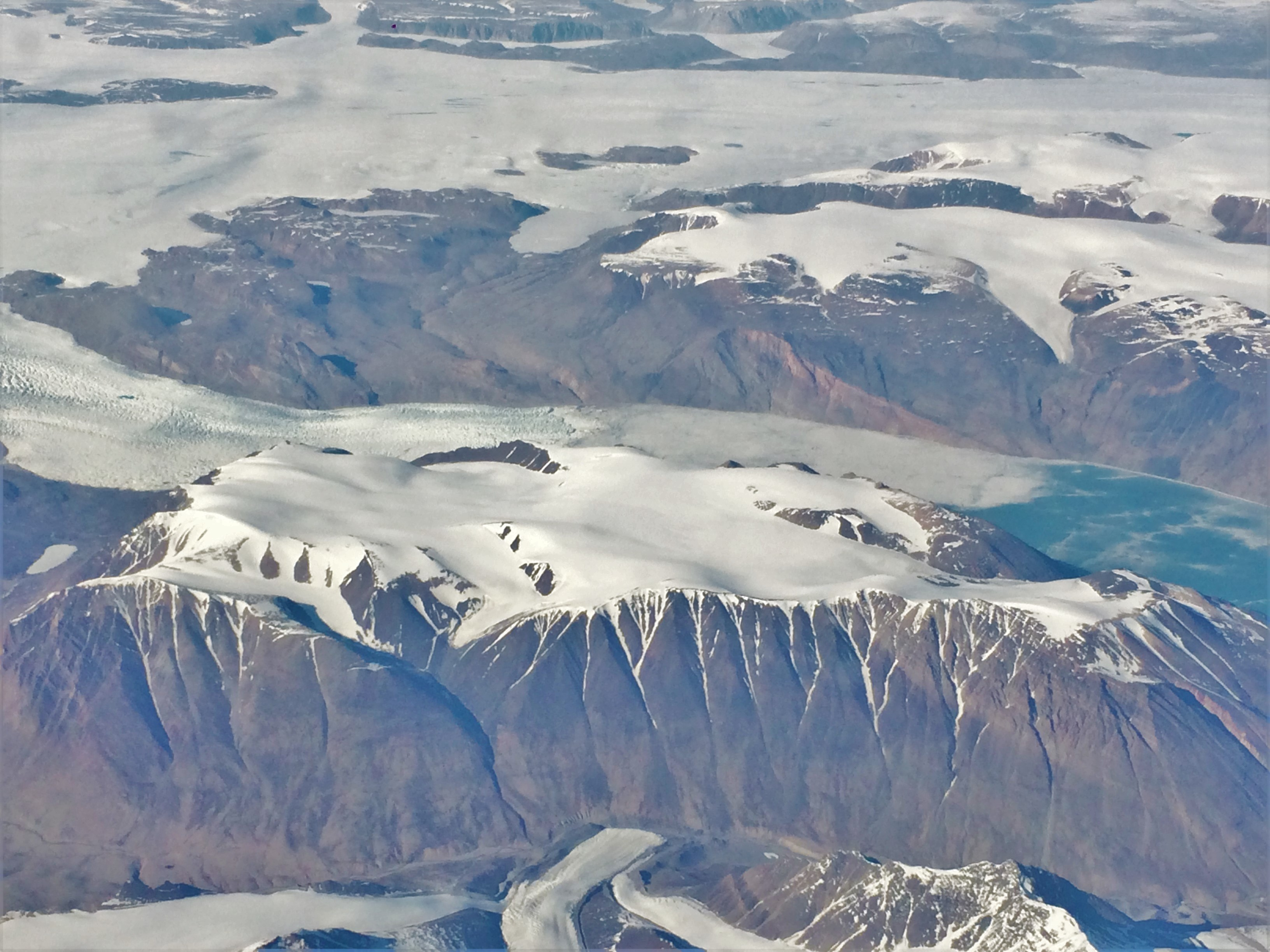
- View of the Nunatak Glacier terminus at the head of Geologfjord

- Location within Greenland
- Type: Piedmont glacier
- Location: Greenland
- Coordinates: 73°57′N 26°0′W
- Length: 20 km (12 mi)
- Width: 2.5 km (1.6 mi)
- Terminus: Geologfjord; Kaiser Franz Joseph Fjord; Greenland Sea

Nunatak Glacier (Danish: Nunatakgletscher), also known as Nunatak Glacier, is a glacier in King Christian X Land, Northeast Greenland. Administratively it lies in the Northeast Greenland National Park zone.

The area where the glacier flows is remote and uninhabited.

== History ==
This glacier was named Nunatak glacieren in 1899 by Swedish Arctic explorer and geologist A.G. Nathorst during the expedition he led to Greenland in search of survivors of S. A. Andrée's Arctic balloon expedition of 1897. The name was chosen owing to the tops of nunataks appearing to overhang it.

== Geography ==
The Nunatak Glacier originates at the eastern end of the Adolf Hoel Glacier, south of the area of the Jakob Kjøde Bjerg nunatak. Strindberg Land lies to the east and the northeastern end of Andrée Land on its western side. It flows in a roughly northwest to southeast direction for about 20 km (12 mi) until its terminus at the head of the Geologfjord. The Eyvind Fjeld Glacier flows beyond the northwestern end of the Nunatak Glacier, to the west of Jakob Kjøde Bjerg.

Map of Northeastern Greenland

== Bibliography ==
- A. K. Higgins, Jane A. Gilotti, M. Paul Smith (eds.), The Greenland Caledonides: Evolution of the Northeast Margin of Laurentia.
- Louise A. Boyd and R. H. Menzies. Fiords of East Greenland: A Photographic Reconnaissance throughout the Franz Josef and King Oscar Flords, Geographical Review Vol. 22, No. 4 (Oct., 1932), pp. 529-561

== See also ==
- List of glaciers in Greenland
