= Ymer Island =

Island in Greenland

Native name: Ymer Ø
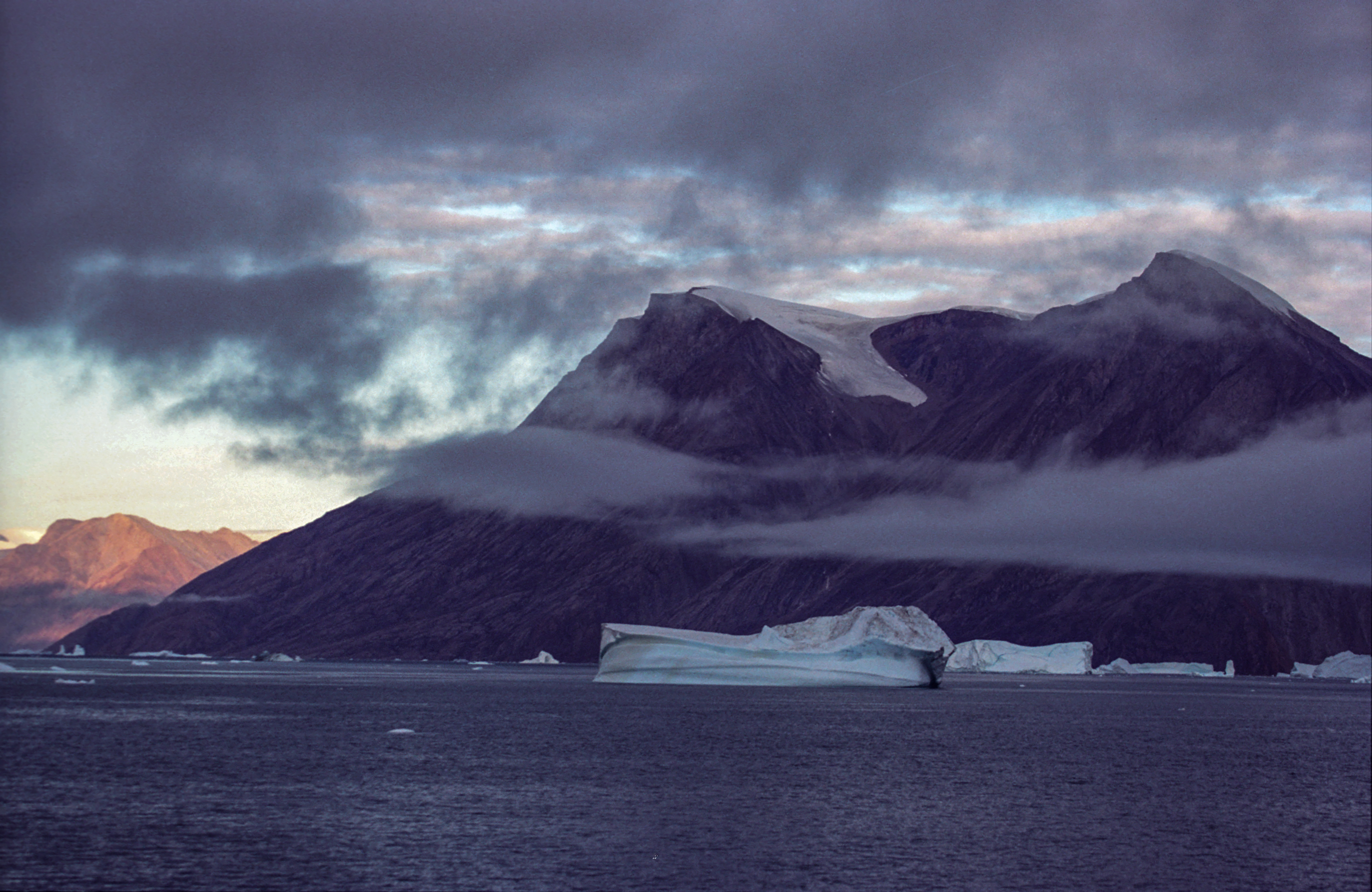
- View of Ymer Island with ice floes in the foreground.

- Location of Ymer Island in Greenland
- Interactive map of Ymer Island
- Etymology: Named after the mythical Norse giant Ymir

Geography
- Location: Greenland Sea
- Coordinates: 73°09′N 24°20′W
- Area: 2,437 km^{2} (941 sq mi)
- Area rank: 5th largest in Greenland; 184th largest in world
- Length: 91 km (56.5 mi)
- Width: 36 km (22.4 mi)
- Highest elevation: 1,900 m (6200 ft)
- Highest point: Angelin Bjerg

Administration
- Greenland
- Unincorporated area: NE Greenland National Park

Demographics
- Population: 0 (2021)
- Pop. density: 0/km^{2} (0/sq mi)
- Ethnic groups: none

Ymer Island (Danish: Ymer Ø) is an island in northeastern Greenland. The island is a part of Northeast Greenland National Park.

Ymer Island is named after the Swedish geographical journal Ymer, which published many accounts of Swedish expeditions to Spitsbergen and Greenland. The journal had been named after the giant Ymir, the forefather of the Jotuns in Norse mythology.

== Geography ==
The island lies on the southern side of the entrance of Kaiser Franz Joseph Fjord, with the Antarctic Sound separating it from the Suess Land Peninsula. Ymer Island's northern half forms a peninsula named Gunnar Anderson Land having its narrow isthmus in the west. The fjord between the two halves of the island is named Dusen Fjord.

Ymer Island has an area of 2,437 km^{2}. It is mountainous; Angelin Bjerg, its highest peak, reaches a height of 1900 m. Celsius Bjerg is located at the southeastern end of the island.

The conspicuous Devil's Castle (Teufelsschloss) is located on the other side of Kaiser Franz Joseph Fjord, off the southern shore of Cape Petersens, the NW extremity of Ymer Island.

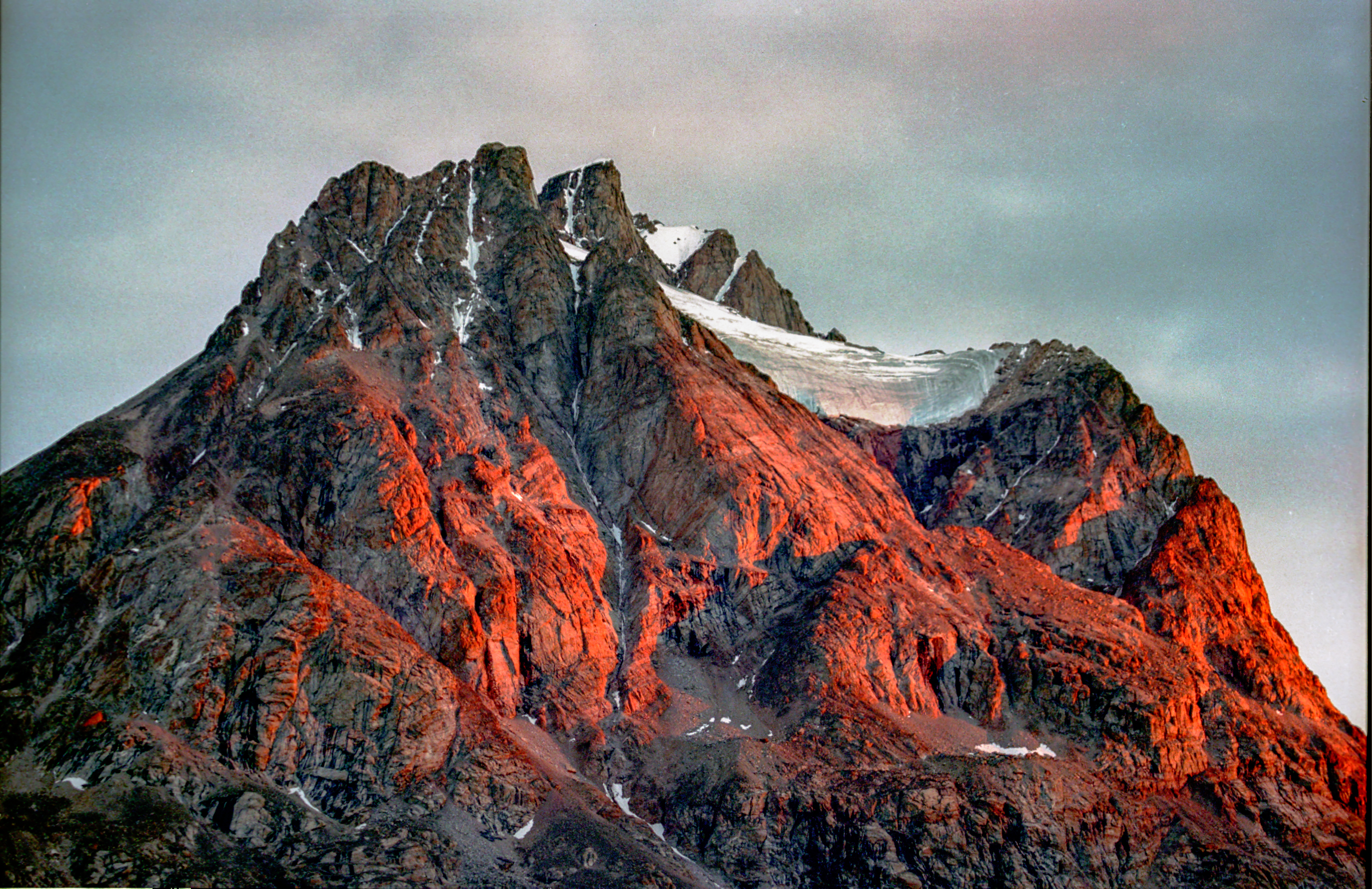
Mountaintops in Ymer Island

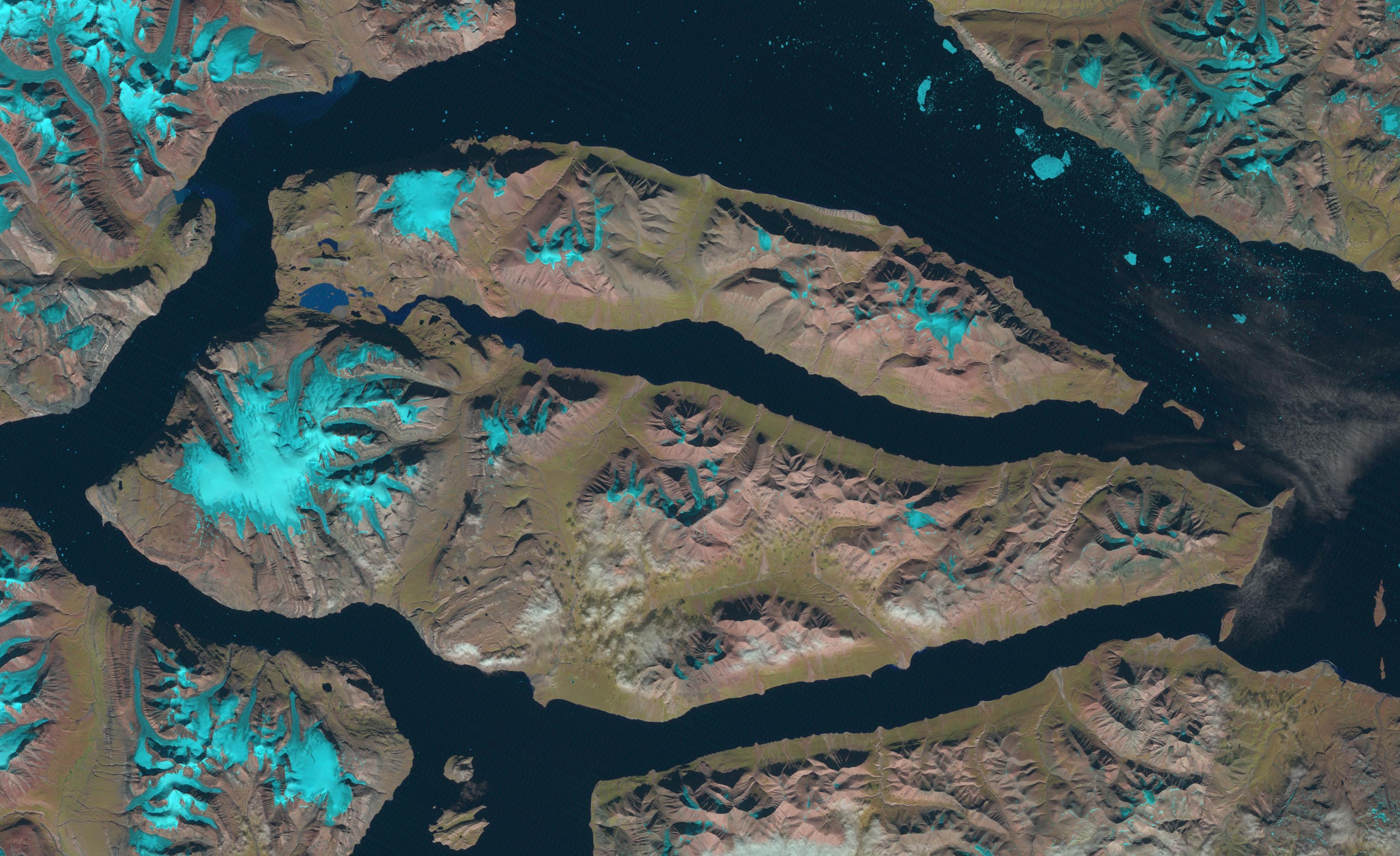
Landsat satellite image

== See also ==
- List of islands of Greenland
