= Frænkel Land =

Peninsula in Greenland

- Location within Greenland

Geography
- Location: East Greenland
- Coordinates: 73°16′N 27°15′W
- Adjacent to: Jaette Glacier; Isfjord; Kaiser Franz Joseph Fjord; Akuliarutsip Sermerssua; Gregory Glacier
- Length: 50 km (31 mi)
- Width: 40 km (25 mi)
- Highest elevation: 2,943 m (9656 ft)
- Highest point: Petermann Peak

Administration
- Greenland (Denmark)
- Zone: NE Greenland National Park

Demographics
- Population: Uninhabited

Frænkel Land is a peninsula in King Christian X Land, East Greenland. Administratively it is part of the Northeast Greenland National Park.

== History ==
It was named Frænkels Halfö by A.G. Nathorst on his 1899 expedition after Knut Frænkel, the Swedish engineer and meteorologist on Andrée's balloon expedition to the North Pole. Nathorst's expedition was searching for traces of the lost Andrée expedition.

Petermann Peak was named by the Second German North Polar Expedition 1869–70 as Petermanns Spitze in honour of the initiator of the expedition, August Heinrich Petermann.

== Geography ==
Frænkel Land is bounded by the inner reaches of Kaiser Franz Joseph Fjord in the south, with the Nordenskiöld Glacier (Akuliarutsip Sermerssua) in the southwest, the Gregory Glacier and the Magog Nunatak in the west, the Jætte Glacier in the north and northwest, and the Isfjord in the northeast.

2940 m high Petermann Peak (Danish: Petermann Bjerg), one of the highest mountains in Greenland, rises in the southwesternmost part of Frænkel Land at 73°05′N 28°37′W. Louise Boyd Land is located to the northwest.

Map of Northeastern Greenland
