= Isfjord =

Fjord in King Christian X Land, eastern Greenland

- Location in Greenland
- Location: Arctic
- Coordinates: 73°18′N 26°28′W
- Ocean/sea sources: Kaiser Franz Joseph Fjord; Greenland Sea
- Basin countries: Greenland
- Max. length: 50 km (31 mi)
- Max. width: 6 km (3.7 mi)

Isfjord, meaning 'Ice Fjord' in the Danish language, is a fjord in King Christian X Land, eastern Greenland. The Isfjord is part of the Kaiser Franz Joseph Fjord complex in the area of the Northeast Greenland National Park.

== Geography ==
The Jaette Glacier in the west and the Gerard de Geer Glacier in the north flow into the head of the Isfjord. Louise Boyd Land rises at the fjord's western end between the two glaciers. This tributary fjord extends between high mountains in a northwest–southeast direction for about 50 km until its mouth in the Kaiser Franz Joseph Fjord at the southern end. To the northeast the fjord is bound by Andrée Land and to the south and southwest by Frænkel Land. The Margaretatop, highest point of Andrée Land, rises north of the shore of the mouth area of the fjord.

Map of Northeastern Greenland

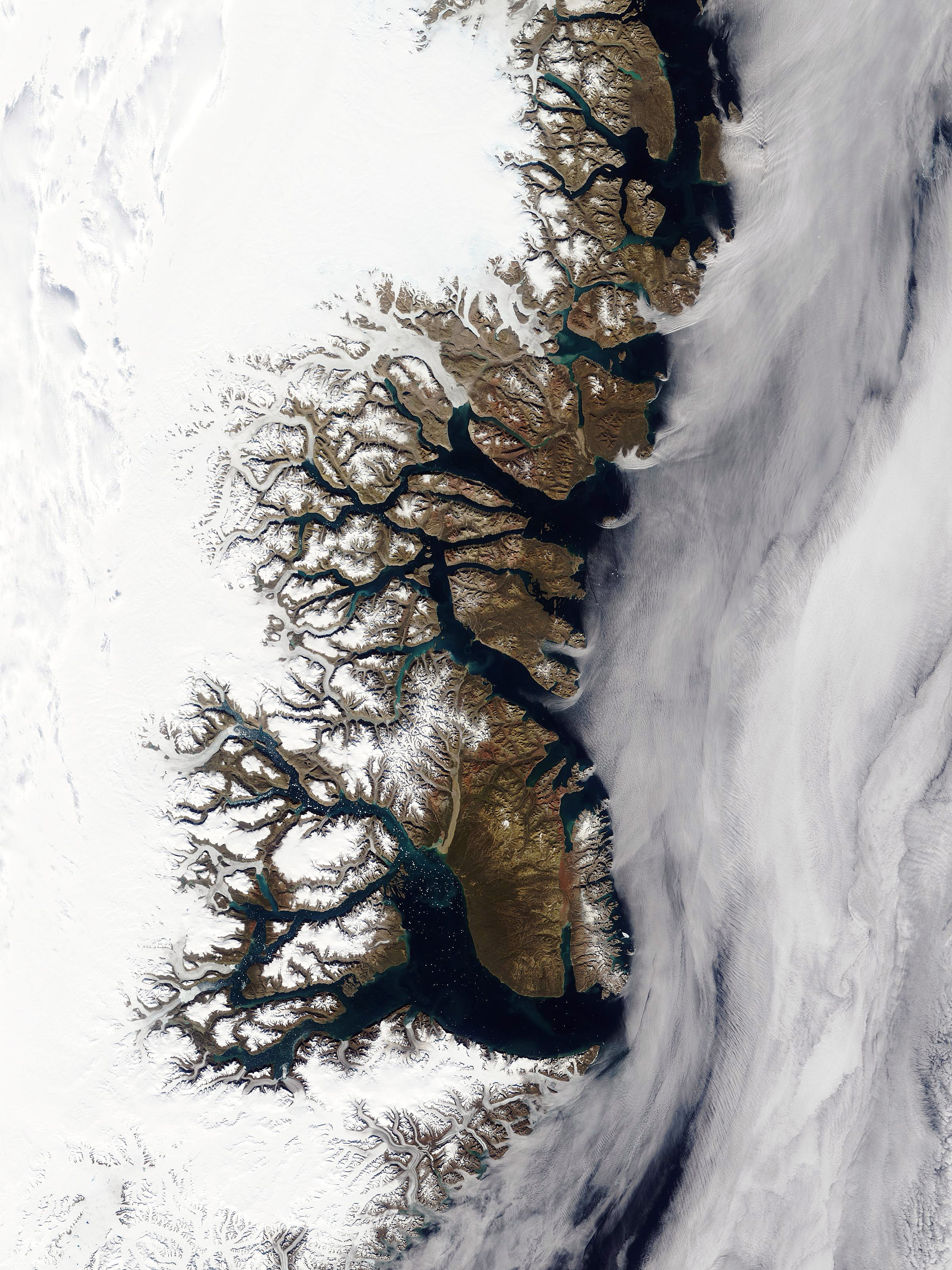
East Greenland Terra/MODIS satellite image

== See also ==
- List of fjords of Greenland
