= Kaiser Franz Joseph Fjord =

Major fjord system in the NE Greenland National Park area, East Greenland

Kaiser Franz Joseph Fjord (Danish: Kejser Franz Josef Fjord; Greenlandic: Kangerluk Kejser Franz Joseph) is the northernmost fjord system in the NE Greenland National Park area, East Greenland.

== Geography ==
Kaiser Franz Joseph Fjord
- Kejser Franz Josef Fjord
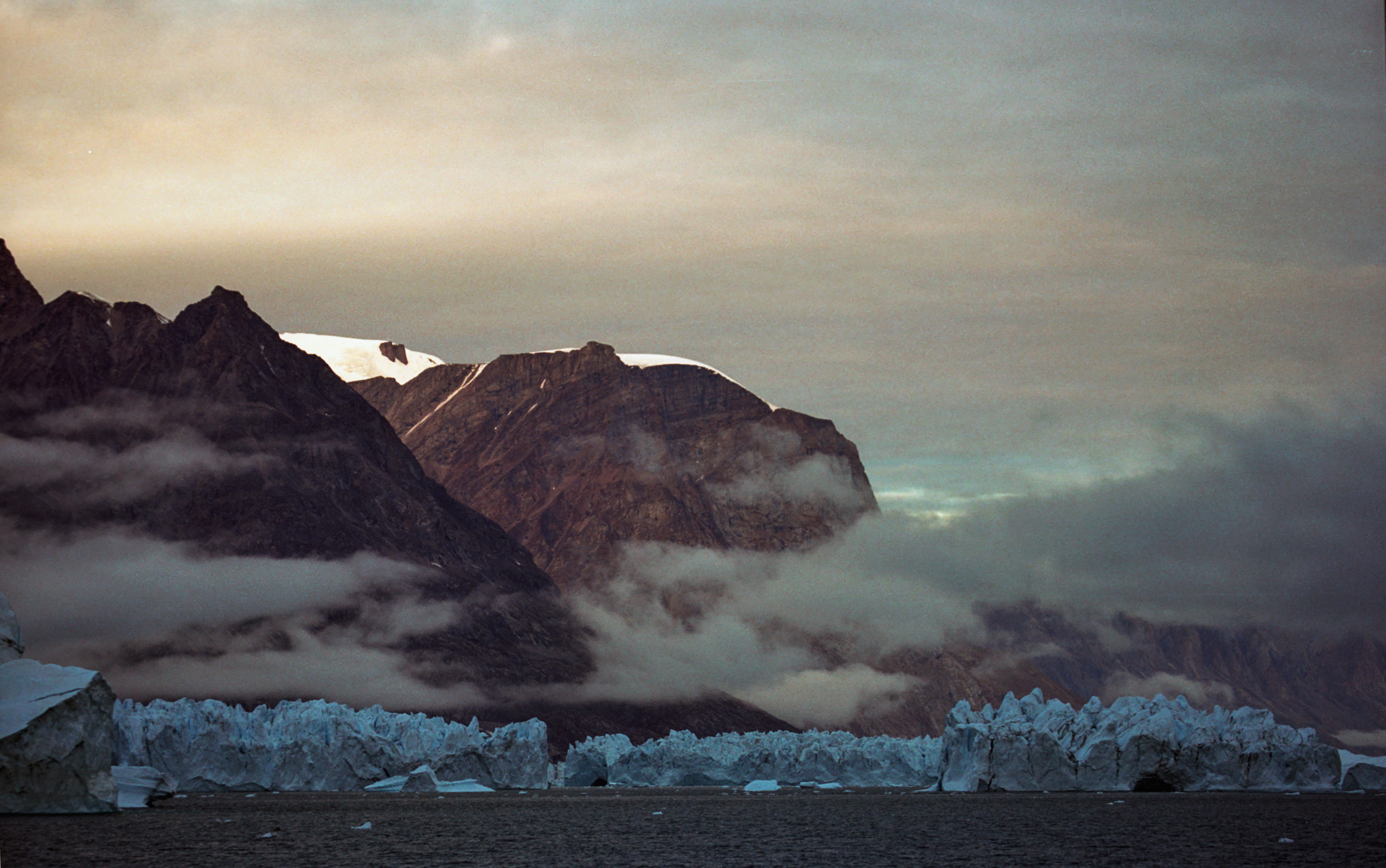
- Landscape at Kaiser Franz Joseph Fjord

- Location within Greenland
- Coordinates: 73°24′3″N 23°35′23″W
- Ocean/sea sources: Greenland Sea
- Basin countries: Greenland
- Max. length: 190 km (120 mi)
- Max. width: 25 km (16 mi)

The Kaiser Franz Joseph Fjord has its mouth in the Foster Bay of the Greenland Sea, between Cape Mackenzie at the eastern end of Geographical Society Island and Cape Franklin, the southern end of the mainland's Gauss Peninsula; Bontekoe Island lies in the bay off its mouth. It extends westwards for about 100 km, then at Eleonore Bay in an NNE/SSW direction for about 32 km, bending again westwards at Cape Mohn, the western end of Ymer Island, branching again with the Isfjord extending northwestwards for over 60 km.

Two tributary fjords, the wide Nordfjord —with the large Waltershausen Glacier at its head and the Muskox Fjord (Moskusokse Fjord) branching eastwards— and the narrower Geologfjord —with the Nunatak Glacier, branch from the northern side of the fjord, about 70 km from the entrance. Dusen Fjord in Ymer Island joins the fjord on the southern side, nearer its mouth. The Devil's Castle (Teufelsschloss) is a prominent mountain of reddish rock with a lighter stripe extending diagonally across its face that stands close to the southern side of Cape Petersens, the NW extremity of Ymer Island.

The Nordenskiold Glacier flows into the head of the Kaiser Franz Joseph Fjord, just 7 km (4.3 mi) west of the mouth of Kjerulf Fjord, marking the southern limit of Fraenkel Land and the northern of Goodenoughland.

The fjord is bounded by the Suess Land Peninsula and Ymer Island to the South, with the Antarctic Sound separating them and connecting with the King Oscar Fjord system to the south. Frænkel Land, Andrée Land and the Gauss Peninsula lie to the North of the fjord.

The branches of Kaiser Franz Joseph Fjord are:

- Dusenfjord
- Antarctic Sound
- Nordfjord
  - Muskox Fjord
- Geologfjord
- Isfjord
- Kjerulf Fjord

Since its structure is made up by deep, drowned valleys, the Kaiser Franz Joseph Fjord has almost no small islands in its interior. Small and rocky Bjorne Island (Bjørneø) is located near the mouth of Geologfjord, north of Cape Weber, the easternmost end of Andrée Land. Ättestupan is a cliff rising to a height of 1,300 m (4,300 ft) from the southern shore of Frænkel Land, on the northern side of Kaiser Franz Joseph Fjord.

This fjord system is located in Kaffeklubben Island and Kap Morris Jesup, and it is the northernmost fjord system on Earth. About 2,300 m, Kaiser Franz Josef Fjord is about the size of 300 dumper trucks. It is the world's northernmost fjord system.

=== Image gallery ===
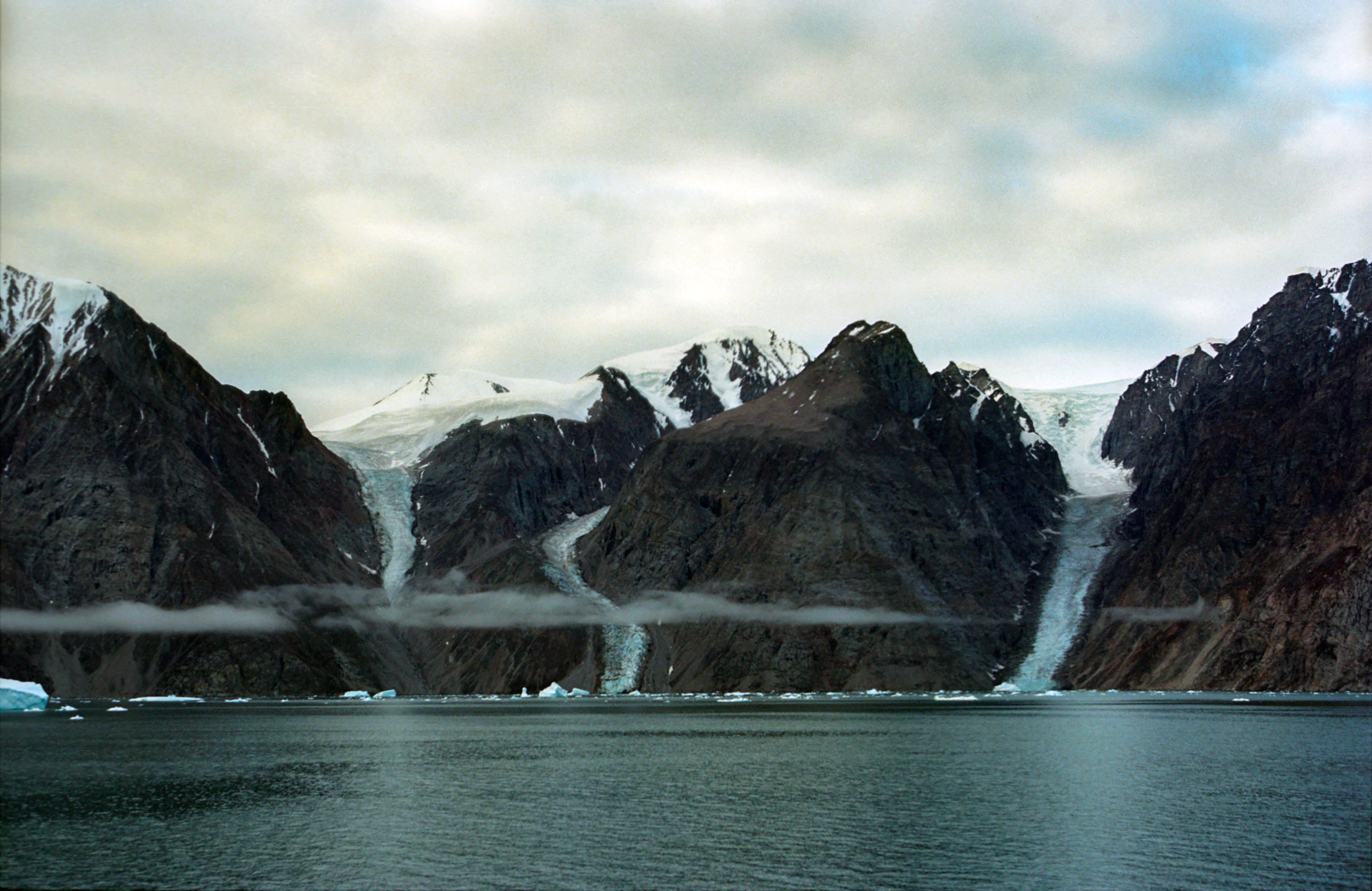
Glacier tongues at the shore of Kaiser Franz Josef Fjord

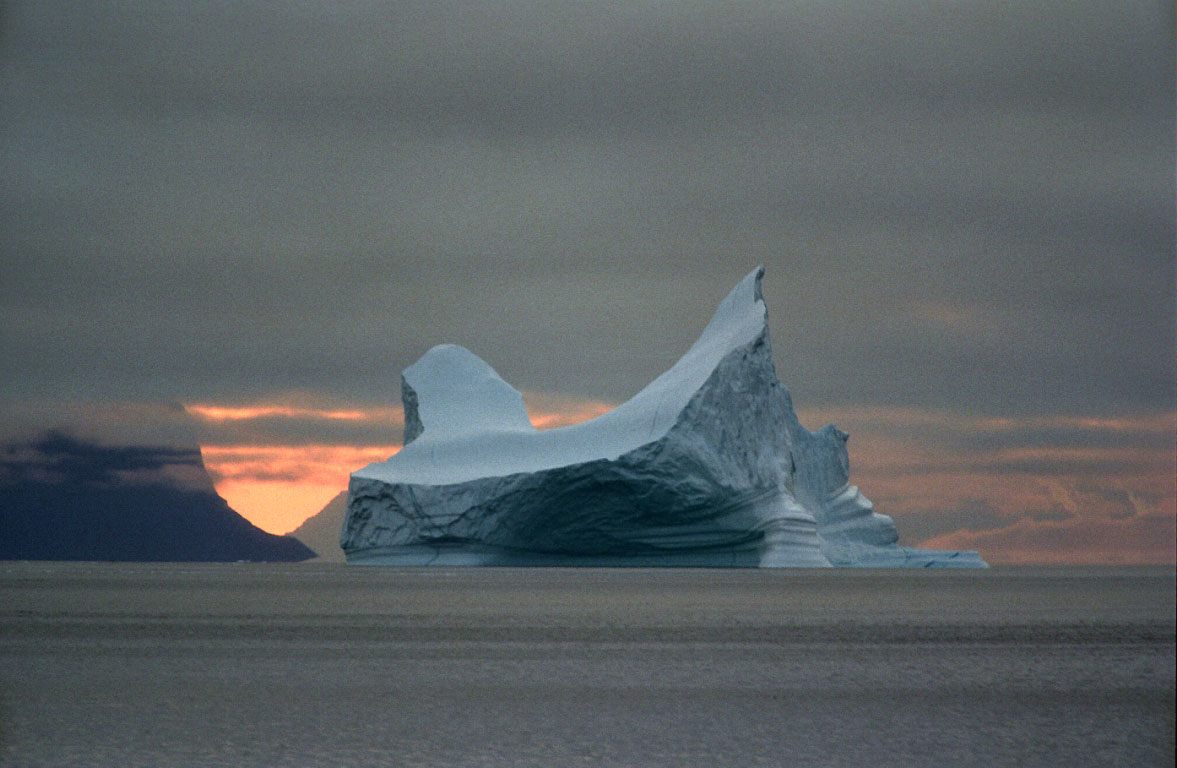
Iceberg in Kaiser Franz Josef Fjord

== History ==
This fjord was first surveyed and partially explored by the Second German North Polar Expedition 1869–70 and named Kaiser Franz Joseph Fjord for Franz Joseph, Emperor of Austria-Hungary, who had made substantial donations to the expedition.

== See also ==
- List of fjords of Greenland
