= Lyell Land =

Peninsula in Greenland

- Location within Greenland

Geography
- Location: East Greenland
- Coordinates: 72°36′N 25°45′W
- Adjacent to: Rhedin Fjord; Kempe Fjord; Narwhal Sound; King Oscar Fjord; Segelsällskapet Fjord; Forsblad Fjord
- Length: 60 km (37 mi)
- Width: 50 km (31 mi)
- Highest elevation: 2,200 m (7200 ft)

Administration
- Greenland (Denmark)
- Zone: NE Greenland National Park

Demographics
- Population: Uninhabited

Lyell Land is a peninsula in King Christian X Land, East Greenland. It is located in the King Oscar Fjord area. Administratively it is part of the Northeast Greenland National Park zone.

It was named by Swedish Arctic explorer A.G. Nathorst on his 1899 expedition after Scottish geologist Charles Lyell (1797–1875).

== Geography ==
Lyell Land is bounded by Kempe Fjord in the north —beyond which lies Suess Land, its branch Rhedin Fjord in the northwest, Narwhal Sound in the northeast —beyond which lies Ella Island, the King Oscar Fjord in the east —opposite Traill Island, Segelsällskapet Fjord to the southeast and Forsblad Fjord —beyond which lies Nathorst Land, in the south. Its northernmost headland is Cape Alfred. At the western end flows the Wahlenberg Glacier, beyond which lies Gletscherland. The peninsula is attached to the mainland in the southwest, on the southern side of the glacier.

The Argand Glacier, the Polhem Valley and the Berzelius Bjerg massif, are some of the outstanding features of the peninsula.

Map of Northeastern Greenland
