= Dansketinden =

Mountain of Greenland

- Location within Greenland

Highest point
- Elevation: 2,842 m (9,324 ft)
- Prominence: 2,181 m (7,156 ft)
- Listing: North America prominent peaks; North America most isolated peaks; North America Ultra prominent peak; Greenland Ultra prominent peak
- Coordinates: 72°7′35″N 24°57′19″W

Geography
- Location: Scoresby Land, Greenland
- Parent range: Stauning Alps

Climbing
- First ascent: 1954

Dansketinden is the highest mountain in the Stauning Alps range, Eastern Greenland.

== Geography ==
Dansketinden rises 15 km east of the shore of the Alpefjord —a branch of the Segelsällskapet Fjord, between the heads of Viking Glacier (Vikingebrae), Gully Glacier and Bersaerkerbrae glaciers. Although according to most available sources this mountain is a 2,842-metre-high (9,324 ft) or 2,831-metre-high (9,288 ft) ultra-prominent peak. it appears as a 2,788-metre-high (9,147 ft) peak in Google Earth.

== Climbing history ==
Dansketinden was first climbed by Swiss mountaineers John Haller (1927–1984), Wolfgang Diehl (1908–1990) and Fritz Schwarzenbach on 5 August 1954. The second ascent was made by a 1964 expedition led by Guido Monzino.

== See also ==
- List of mountain peaks of Greenland
- List of mountains in Greenland
- List of the ultra-prominent summits of North America
- List of the major 100-kilometer summits of North America
- Norsketinden
