= Wegener Peninsula =

Peninsula in Sermersooq, Greenland

Wegener Halvø
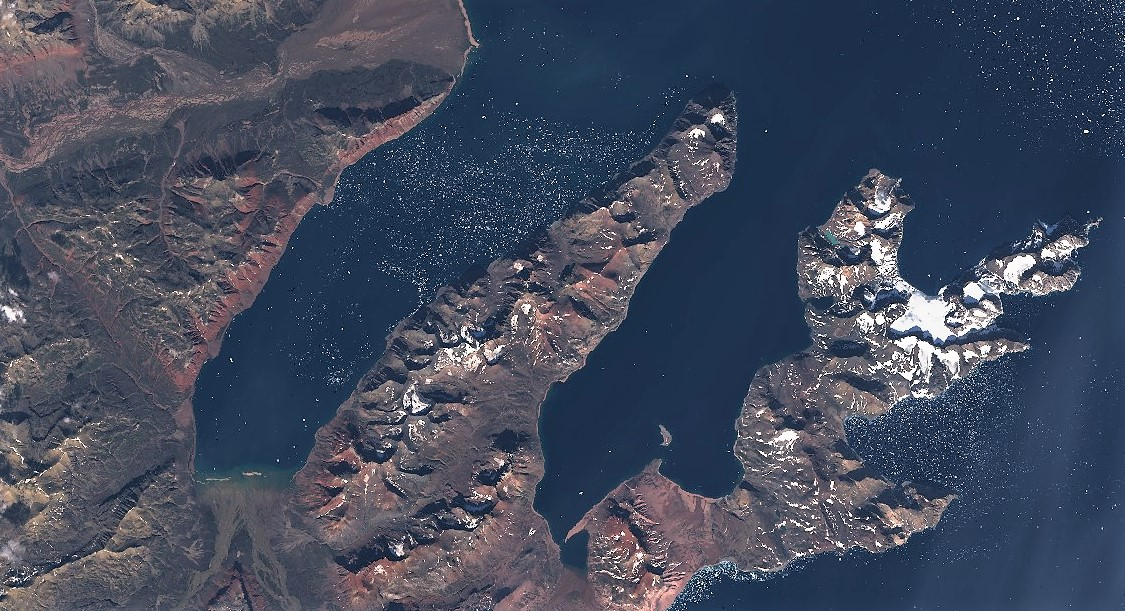
- Wegener Peninsula Sentinel-2 image

- Location within Greenland

Geography
- Location: East Greenland
- Coordinates: 71°40′50″N 22°44′45″W
- Adjacent to: Fleming Fjord; Davy Sound; Nathorst Fjord
- Length: 27 km (16.8 mi)
- Width: 9 km (5.6 mi)
- Highest elevation: 975 m (3199 ft)

Administration
- Greenland (Denmark)
- Zone: Northeast Greenland National Park

Demographics
- Population: Uninhabited

Wegener Peninsula (Danish: Wegener Halvø) is a peninsula in King Christian X Land, East Greenland. Administratively it is part of the Northeast Greenland National Park.

== History ==
This peninsula was named during the Three-year Expedition to East Greenland by Arne Noe-Nygaard (1908-1991). He named it after German scientist Alfred Wegener (1880–1930), who had taken part in the 1906–08 Danmark Expedition and the 1912–13 Danish Expedition to Queen Louise Land led by J.P. Koch. Wegener died in 1930 on the Greenland ice sheet during the Wegener Expedition led by himself.

== Geography ==
The peninsula is bounded in the northwest by the Fleming Fjord, Kap Brown is the point to the northeast, jutting into the Davy Sound to the south of Cape Biot. The Nathorst Fjord extends on the southeastern side and to the southwest the Wegener Peninsula is connected to the mainland.

== Bibliography ==
- A. K. Higgins, Jane A. Gilotti, M. Paul Smith (eds.), The Greenland Caledonides: Evolution of the Northeast Margin of Laurentia.
