= Cape Brown (Greenland) =

Headland in east Greenland

Cape Brown Kap Brown
- Headland
- Coordinates: 71°41′N 22°30′W
- Location: Sermersooq, Greenland
- Offshore water bodies: Greenland Sea

Area
  - Total: Arctic
- Elevation: 930

Cape Brown (Danish: Kap Brown) is a headland in the Greenland Sea, east Greenland, Sermersooq municipality.

== History ==
This headland was named "Cape Brown" by William Scoresby (1789–1857) in 1822 to honour Scottish botanist Robert Brown (1773–1858).

A small wintering station known as "Kap Brown Station" was built in 1934 on the eastern shore of nearby Fleming Fjord 15 km (9.3 mi) SW of Cape Brown at the time of the Three-year Expedition to East Greenland. The names Vimmelskaftet and Flemmingfjordhuset were also used for the same station.

== Geography ==
Cape Brown is located in the Greenland Sea south of Cape Biot, off the southern end of Davy Sound.

Cape Brown is the northernmost point of the Wegener Peninsula in Jameson Land. Rising between the mouth of Fleming Fjord to the west and Nathorst Fjord to the east, it is a 930 m (3,050 ft) high conspicuous headland with reddish-brown rocky sides.

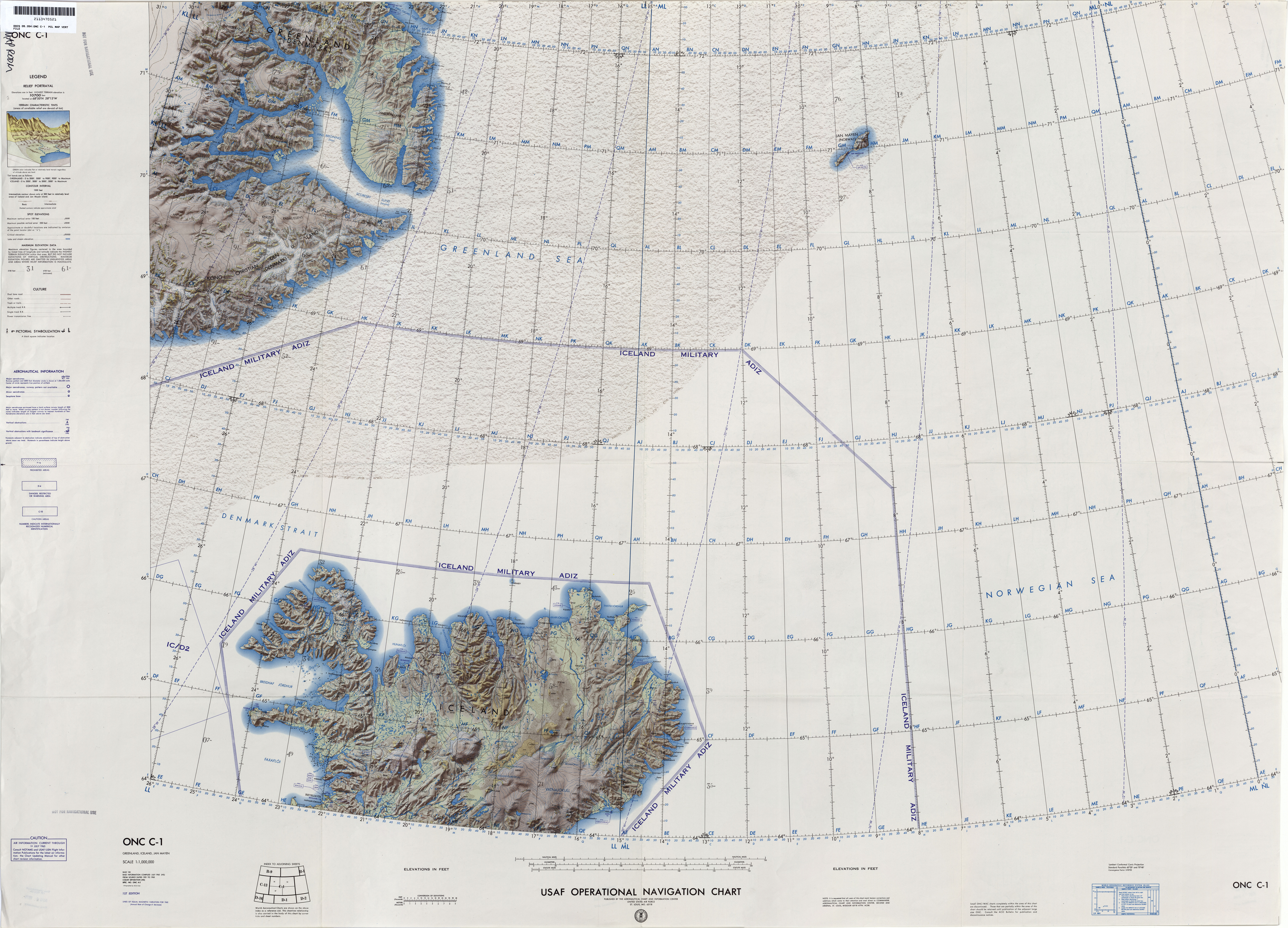
Map of NE Greenland and Iceland with Cape Brown in the upper left corner

== See also ==
- Geography of Greenland
