= Stauning Alps =

Mountain range in Greenland

- Stauning Alper
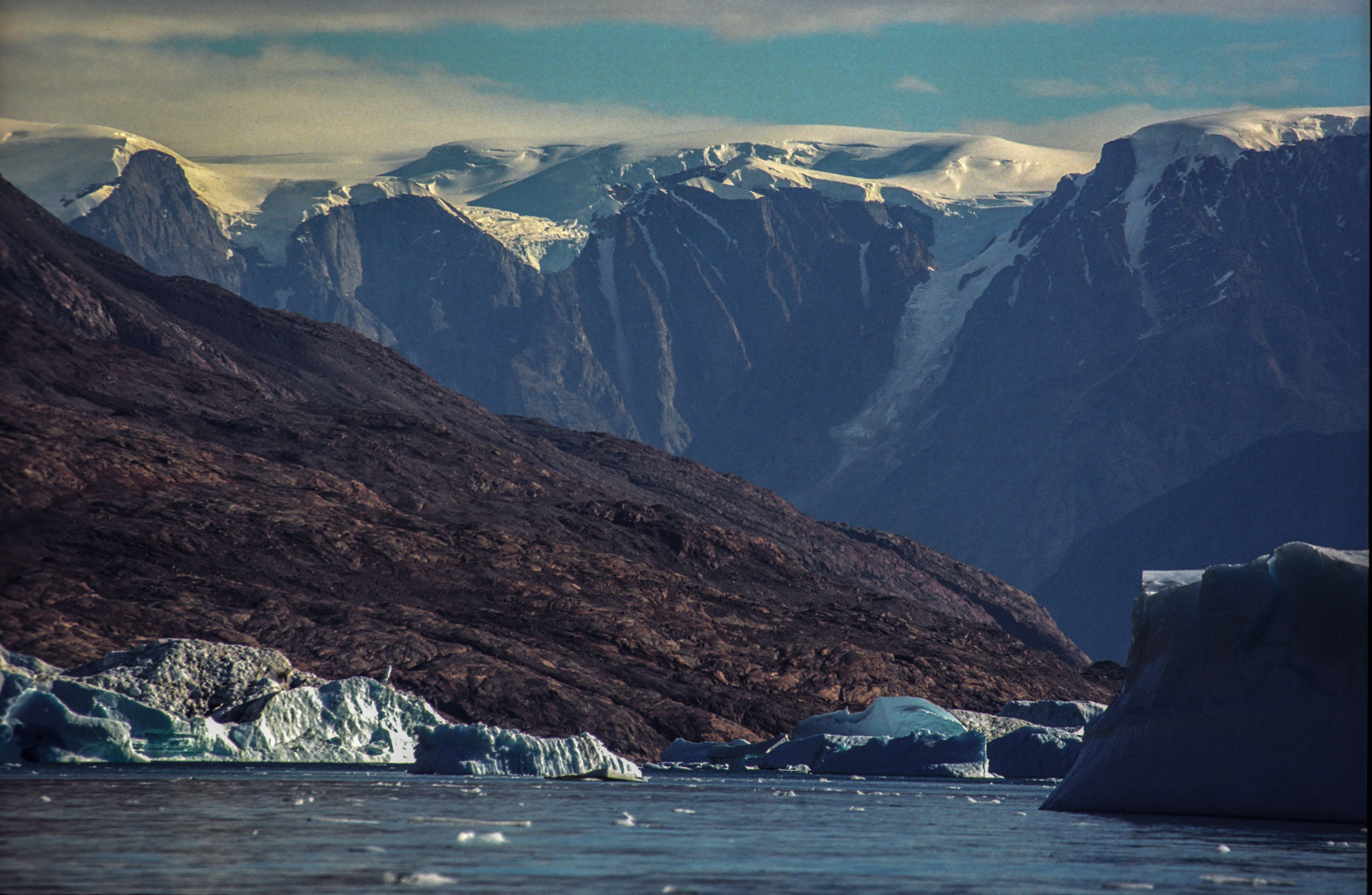
- One of the massive ranges at the southern end of the Stauning Alps viewed from the Nordvestfjord

Highest point
- Peak: Dansketinden
- Elevation: 2,842 m (9,324 ft)

Dimensions
- Length: 120 km (75 mi) N/S
- Width: 50 km (31 mi) E/W
- Area: 6,000 km^{2} (2,300 mi^{2})

Geography
- Location within Greenland
- Country: Greenland
- Range coordinates: 72°0′N 25°0′W

Geology
- Rock type: Metamorphic rock

The Stauning Alps (Danish: Stauning Alper) are a large system of mountain ranges in Scoresby Land, King Christian X Land, northeastern Greenland. Administratively the Stauning Alps are part of the Northeast Greenland National Park zone.

This mountainous area was named after Danish politician Thorvald Stauning (1873–1942) who had helped to finance expeditions to east Greenland planned and carried out by Danish explorers.

== History ==
The Stauning Alps had been partly mapped earlier and named Rink Bjerge by Lauge Koch’s 1926–27 expeditions, being referred to as a "wild and jagged range of mountains." The range thus described obviously corresponded to the eastern end of the Stauning Alps and the adjacent Werner Range, but the name was not approved owing to the lack of detailed maps. Finally the range was thoroughly surveyed and mapped in 1932 by Koch during aerial surveys made during the 1931–34 Three-year Expedition to East Greenland.

There is almost full documentation of climbing in the Stauning Alps by the successive expeditions that have visited the mountain system. Most of the available climbing reports have either been published or deposited in the archives of the Danish Polar Center (DPC), the Royal Geographical Society of London (RGS) or the British Mountaineering Council (BMC).

Dansketinden, the highest point of the Stauning Alps was first climbed by Swiss mountaineers John Haller (1927–1984), Wolfgang Diehl (1908–1990) and Fritz Schwarzenbach on 5 August 1954. The second ascent was made by a 1964 Italian expedition led by Guido Monzino (1928 – 1988).

== Geography ==
The Stauning Alps are bound to the north by the King Oscar Fjord and its Segelsällskapet Fjord branch, to the east by the Skel Valley, the Schuchert Flod river and the Holger Danske Briller lakes, to the west by the Alpefjord —a branch of the Segelsällskapet Fjord beyond which lies Nathorst Land— and the Borgbjerg Glacier, and to the south by a part of the Nordvestfjord, the NW branch of the Scoresby Sound.

The range is very rugged with numerous high rocky peaks and active glaciers in almost all valleys. It is made up of granite, harder in the northern than in the southern subranges. Therefore, the mountains in the north of the Stauning Alps are generally more craggy, while those in the south are more eroded and have a relatively smoother appearance.

The whole area of this vast range system is an uninhabited, desolate mountainous expanse. The nearest settlement is Ittoqqortoormiit and the nearest airfields are Nerlerit Inaat Airport at Constable Point to the east and Mestersvig to the north. Access to the range requires a special permit.

=== Subranges and other features ===
The Murchison Range (Murchison Bjerge) (72°18′N 25°0′W) is a subrange located in the northwestern area of the Stauning Alps that was named after Scottish geologist Roderick Impey Murchison (1792–1871). It stretches between the Sedgwick Glacier and the Alpefjord.

The Syltoppene (72°20′N 24°33′W) are a mountain ridge with needle-like summits at the northern end of the Stauning Alps that was named by A.G. Nathorst in 1899. Satan's Gallery (72°4′N 25°7′W) is a ridge with a series of formidable peaks NNE of Korsspids and south of the Gully Glacier that was named by the 1963 Cambridge University Expedition.

The Alliance Col is a 2,250 m high mountain pass named by the 1992 Scottish Stauning Alps Expedition.

=== Mountains ===
The Stauning Alps have a big concentration of mountains higher than 2,700 metres (8,860 ft). The highest point is Dansketinden (2,842 m). Other noteworthy peaks are:

- Norsketinden (2,797 m); also known as Stortoppen
- Jaalspids (2,788 m)
- Korsspids (2,780 m)
- Snetoppen (2,763 m)
- Middle Peak (2,757 m)
- Korsspids (2,751 m)
- Grande Jorasses (2,750 m)
- Sefström Tinde (2,714 m)
- Italytinde (2,710 m)
- Pembroke Kuppel (2,710 m), snow dome
- Bosigran (2,700 m)
- Lamorna (2,700 m)
- Treyarnon (2,700 m)
- Hermann von Barth Tinde (2,681 m)
- Hjørnespids (2,650 m)
- Berggeistspids (2,615 m)
- An Caisteal (2,614 m)
- Frihedstinde (2,610 m)
- Ian’s Peak (2,607 m)
- Palatinus (2,600 m)
- Glatze (2,598 m), snow dome on top
- Guglia della Norsketinde (2,592 m)
- Doseths Fjell (2,590 m)
- Duart Borg (2,583 m)
- Dresdner Spids (2,580 m)
- Aliertinde (2,580 m)
- Mont Saussure (2,580 m)
- Prometheus (2,574 m)
- Bolværket (2,571 m)
- Daehlis Fjell (2,570 m)
- Berchtesgadener Tinde (2,560 m)
- Drillinge (2,560 m), mountain with three conspicuous granite pinnacles
- Roslin Borg (2,560 m)
- Archangel Peak (2,558 m)
- Klubtinde (2,550 m)
- Borgbjergtinde (2,546 m)
- Diannsketinden (2,532 m)
- Heens Fjell (2,530 m)
- Dunottar Bjerg (2,524 m)
- Ebensbjerge (2,510 m)
- Lancaster (2,510 m)
- D. Eglin Spire (2,500 m)
- Münchner Tinde (2,500 m)
- Møysalen, twin-peaked mountain with 2,450 m and 2,500 m summits
- Berchtesgadener Kopf (2,499 m)
- Notting Hill (2,498 m)
- Cima Virgilio (2,497 m), pinnacle on Satan's Gallery ridge
- Weisse Wand (2,497 m),
- Cicero (2,496 m)
- Himmelstinde (2,492 m)
- Czoks Topp (2,490 m)
- Kensington (2,489 m)
- Tantallon Spids (2,480 m)
- Tantalus (2,477 m)
- Rasmussen Spids (2,468 m)
- Annsketinde (2,460 m)
- Tiber Tinde (2,460 m)
- Cold Shoulder (2,450 m)
- Lambeth (2,450 m)
- Crescent Tind (2,449 m)
- Froggies Beaut (2,446 m)
- St. Bartholomews Tårn (2,440 m), rock peak with twin summits
- Cordulaspids (2,430 m)
- Keswicktinde (2,430 m)
- Margretabjerg (2,430 m)
- Eugen-Heinz Tinde (2,415 m)
- Tillyrie (2,415 m)
- Eckturm (2,413 m)
- Solveigs Sang (2,410 m)
- Kastenberg (2,401 m)
- Emmanuel Fjeld (2,400 m)
- Merchiston Tinde (2,400 m)
- Ruthven Spids (2,400 m)
- Ulmer Spids (2,400 m)
- Borgbjergkamm, an up to 2,400 m high ridge
- Oleryggen (2,399 m)
- Bacchustinde (2,397 m)
- Kvitegga (2,396 m), snow field on top
- Helmspitzen (2,396 m)
- Downing Fjeld (2,395 m)
- Alfred Wegener Bjerg (2,394 m)
- S. Paolo (2,389 m), one of the pinnacles of Satan's Gallery
- Augsburger Spids (2,385 m)
- Hasentinde (2,376 m)
- Piz Dominant (2,370 m)
- Homerton (2,360 m), snow dome
- Christinabjerg (2,350 m)
- Møya (2,350 m)
- Proctor’s Pinnacle (2,350 m)
- Seanearbheinn (2,350 m)
- Slanstinde (2,350 m)
- Tandlaegetinde (2,350 m)
- Skjervens Tind (2,349 m)
- Pinnacle (2,342 m)
- Puchwhitstinde (2,339 m)
- Drumglas (2,330 m)
- Jobjerg (2,330 m)
- Skartind (2,310 m), snow summit
- Tårnet (2,310 m)
- Schwabentinde (2,307 m)
- Scorpio (2,302 m)
- Albert Peak (2,300 m)
- Sidney Fjeld (2,300 m)
- Molehill (2,300 m)
- Sussex Fjeld (2,300 m)
- Hecla (2,295 m)
- Great Cumbrae (2,293 m)
- Pyramid Peak (2,293 m)
- Caius Fjeld (2,280 m), sharp rock summits
- Beaufort Tinde (2,277 m), rock spire; also known as Kapelleturm
- Sentinel (2,277 m)
- Snow Comb (2,272 m)
- Wedge Peak (2,266 m)
- Elisabethsminde (2,260 m)
- Kjeldstrups Tinde (2,250 m)
- Tour Carrée (2,250 m)
- Tromsøtind (2,250 m)
- Bonar Bjerg (2,241 m)
- Susan’s Peak (2,238 m)
- Eckhorn (2,230 m)
- Mythotinde (2,224 m)
- Clare Fjeld (2,220 m)
- White (2,211 m)
- Dreverspids (2,210 m)
- Garmischer Spids (2,209 m)
- Baerenzahn (2,209 m)
- Royal Peak (2,202 m)
- Attilaborgen (2,201 m); also known as Kathedrale
- Blair Peak (2,200 m)
- Hecla (2,200 m)
- St. Johns Tinde (2,200 m)
- Bøygen (2,199 m)
- Kishmul Borg (2,191 m)
- Highgate (2,190 m)
- Tent Peak (2,189 m)
- Kvitfjell (2,188 m)
- Glamis Borg (2,187 m)
- Gauche Peak (2,185 m)
- Islington (2,183 m)
- Bavariaspitze (2,180 m)
- Kapelle (2,178 m)
- Boulderbjerg (2,177 m)
- Point Jilly (2,175 m)
- Westminster (2,164 m), possibly a subsidiary summit of Royal Peak
- Granit Spids (2,159 m)
- Diamond Peak (2,150 m)
- Nevis (2,150 m)
- Tritontind (2,150 m)
- Österreichspitze (2,150 m)
- Tirefour (2,140 m), rock tower
- Achnacarry Spids (2,130 m)
- Lagertoppen (2,113 m)
- Füssener Ryggen (2,105 m)
- Edinburgh (2,100 m)
- Schwarzer Zwilling (2,100 m)
- Mears Fjeld (2,100 m)
- Priener Kalotte (2,100 m)
- Santes Fair (2,100 m)
- Lang Peak 1, 2, 3, 4, 5 and 6. Series of six peaks ranging between 1,940 m and 2,100 m
- Hermes (2,098 m)
- Junction Peak (2,097 m)
- Kirriemuir (2,094 m)
- Girton Fjeld (2,089 m)
- Dollar (2,085 m)
- Kilvrough Fjeld (2,081 m)
- Tårnfjeld (2,072 m)
- Culross (2,067 m)
- Drumglas Beag (2,060 m)
- Juliasbjerge (2,058 m)
- Daedalus (2,040 m)
- Inverarnan (2,035 m), twin summits
- Caerleon (2,028 m)
- Eros (2,018 m)
- Mitterspids (2,016 m)
- Tunatinde (2,003 m)
- Hermitage (2,001 m)
- Berzaerkerspire (2,000 m), dramatic looking peak, also known as Spiret
- Kilmory Fjeld (1,998 m)
- Dreispitz (1,995 m), three rock peaks; one of them named Pointe Michel Gravost
- Gonville Fjeld (1,994 m), rock summit
- Eilan Donan (1,992 m), rock summit
- Tioram Spids (1,991 m)
- Glamis Borg (1,985 m), granite rock summit
- Point Neurose (1,973 m)
- Skiferbjerg (1,970 m)
- Hahnenkamm (1,967 m)
- Högspids (1,954 m)
- Hellefjeld (1,947 m)
- First Point of Aries (1,944 m)
- Moena Tinde (1,940 m)
- Beaumaris Fjeld (1,900 m)
- Maclear (1,900 m)
- Dunvegan Toppene (1,894 m)
- Pap of Cumbrae (1,885 m)
- Yllis (1,881 m)
- Bastille Peak (1,870 m)
- Taurobjerg (1,860 m)
- Blackwall (1,850 m)
- Pimlico (1,850 m)
- Zeus (1,850 m), rock peak 1850 m
- Piz Guarda Monti (1,840 m)
- Harlech Fjeld (1,836 m)
- Elephant (1,830 m)
- Castle (1,830 m)
- Elsinore Fjeld (1,829 m)
- Lennox Spids (1,800 m)
- Karabiner Fjeld (1,797 m)
- Imperial College Peak (1,795 m)
- Dinosaur (1,794 m), highest summit of a row of rocky peaks in the southern zone
- Stuegulvet (1,780 m)
- Vardefjeld (1,778 m)
- Skotsketinde (1,775 m)
- Panoramic Peak (1,771 m)
- Arundel Gate (1,770 m)
- Hirschbichler Spids (1,703 m)
- Bow (1,700 m)
- Midnight Peak (1,700 m)
- Piccadilly (1,692 m)
- Frique Peak (1,690 m)
- Akselborg (1,685 m)
- Wapping (1,680 m)
- Mollytinde (1,670 m)
- Richmond (1,650 m), rock peak
- Piz Vadian (1,640 m)
- Stirling Fjeld (1,640 m)
- Bear Peak (1,598 m)
- Blåhorn (1,589 m), also known as Monte Carmela
- Peveril (1,587 m)
- Kilroy (1,520 m)
- Menander Spir (1,492 m), sharp rock summit of the Syltoppene
- The Rock Finger (1,457 m), prominent minor peak
- Tintagel Fjeld (1,294 m)
- Aztekerborgen (1,286 m)
- Nordsylen (1,196 m), northernmost spire of the Syltoppene

=== Glaciers ===
Practically all the valleys in the Stauning Alps are filled by active glaciers that mostly flow towards the North, East or South. Generally those glaciers flowing towards the west are steep and have dangerous icefalls with deep crevasses.

Some of the glaciers in the range system are very large, such as the Spaerre Glacier (Spærregletscher) and Sefstrøm Glacier to the west, the Skjoldungebrae to the north and the Bersaerkerbrae (Bersærkerbræ) to the east. Other important glaciers in the Stauning Alps are:

- Aries Glacier
- Bacchus Glacier
- Beaumaris Glacier
- Bjørnbo Glacier
- Borgbjerg Glacier
- Canta Brae, also known as Trinity Glacier
- Cavendish Glacier
- Colosseum Glacier
- Duart Glacier
- Dunottar Glacier
- Edinbrae
- Essemmceebrae
- Fangsthyttegletscher
- Fimbulbreen
- Fleskesvoren (Icefall)
- Flødegletscher
- Frihedsgletscher
- Gannochy Glacier
- Gully Glacier
- Harlech Glacier
- Hecate Glacier
- Ivar Baardsøn Glacier
- Jupiter Glacier
- Kishmul Glacier
- Krabbe Glacier
- Linné Glacier
- Mars Glacier
- Mercurius Glacier
- Neptunus Glacier (Løberen)
- Orion Glacier
- Oxford Glacier, also known as Uranus Glacier
- Princess Glacier
- Roslin Glacier
- Sedgwick Glacier
- Schuchert Glacier, also known as Kongespejlet
- Skel Glacier
- Stor Glacier, also known as Langgletscher
- Triton Glacier
- Viking Glacier

== Climate ==
The Stauning Alps lie in the high Arctic zone. Polar climate prevails in the area of the range, the average annual temperature in the area being -16 °C . The warmest month is July when the average temperature rises to -2 °C and the coldest is January with -21 °C.

== Bibliography ==
- Bennet, D. 1972: Staunings Alps, Gaston's Alpine Books and West Col Productions, Reading, SBN 901516 58 9.
- Halliday, Geoffrey (1962). "Northern Stauning Alps". American Alpine Journal. 13 (1). American Alpine Club: 251–252.
- Herrligkoffer, K.M. 1967: Bergsteigen in der Arktis. Deutsche Grönland-Expedition 1966 in die Staunings-Alpen. Berge der Welt 16, 129–145.
- Hunt, J. & Sugden, J. 1962: An expedition to the Staunings Alper, Scoresby Land. Geographical Journal 128, 39–48.
- Key, M.[H.] 1964: Stauning Alps, 1963. Exploration Review (Imperial College, London) 5, 28–31.
- Meinherz, P. 1965: Grönland Expedition des Akademischen Alpenclubs Zürich in die Stauningsalpen. Die Alpen 41, 225–232.
- Miller, K.J. 1976: Traverse of the Staunings Alps. Alpine Journal 81, 143–153.
- Peden, John (1993). "Scottish Staunings Alper Expedition". Climbs And Expeditions. American Alpine Journal. 35 (67). American Alpine Club.
- Pinkerton, Harry (1972). "Staunings Alper". Climbs And Expeditions. American Alpine Journal. 18 (1). American Alpine Club: 152–153.
- Read, Colin (2002). "Great Cumbrae Glacier, first ascents". Climbs And Expeditions. American Alpine Journal. 44 (76). American Alpine Club: 281.
- Reid, S. 1997: Staunings Alper, various ascents. American Alpine Journal 1997, 219–221.
- Rotovnik, D. 1988: Stauning Alper. American Alpine Journal 1988, 154 only.
- Rotovnik, D. 1991: Staunings Alper. American Alpine Journal 1991, 189 only.
- Slesser, M. 1964a: Die Staunings-Alpen. Britische Ostgrönland Expeditionen 1958 und 1960. Berge der Welt 14, 1962/63, 197–235.
- Slesser, M. 1964b: The Stauning Alps of eastern Greenland. The Mountain World 1962–63, 161–196.
- Weinzierl, Wolfgang (1971). "Trekant Basin, Staunings Alps, Northeast Greenland". Climbs And Expeditions. American Alpine Journal. 17 (2). American Alpine Club: 395.

== See also ==
- East Greenland Orogen
- List of glaciers in Greenland
- List of mountain ranges of Greenland
