= Fleming Fjord =

Bay in Sermersooq, Greenland

- "Fleming Inlet"
- Location in Greenland
- Interactive map of Fleming Fjord
- Location: Arctic
- Coordinates: 71°45′N 22°49′W
- Ocean/sea sources: Greenland Sea
- Basin countries: Greenland
- Max. length: 27 km (17 mi)
- Max. width: 9 km (5.6 mi)
- Settlements: 0

Fleming Fjord is a fjord in King Christian X Land, eastern Greenland.

Administratively it lies in the Sermersooq Municipality.

== History ==
This fjord was named "Fleming Inlet" by British explorer William Scoresby (1789 – 1857) after Scottish scholar John Fleming (1785–1857). Scoresby assumed that this fjord connected with "Hall Inlet" (Hall Bredning) to the south.

After more than a century, this fjord was finally properly explored and mapped by Danish Arctic explorer Georg Carl Amdrup during the Three-year Expedition to East Greenland (Treårsekspeditionen) (1931–1934). Although Amdrup's survey proved that it was a fjord, the name "Fleming Inlet" continued to be used on maps for many years.

A small wintering station was built in 1934 on the east side of Fleming Fjord near Cape Brown at the mouth of the Vimmelskaftet Valley during the time of the Three-year Expedition to East Greenland.

A Norwegian hunting hut was built in 1954 on the north side of the fjord 10 km (6.2 mi) SW of Kap Biot, at the time of Hermann Andresen’s expedition. Another one was built nearby in 1955 by Otto Lapstun, who had moved it from nearby Nathorst Fjord.

== Geography ==
Fleming Fjord is located SE of the mouth of Davy Sound, cutting into Jameson Land, extending roughly southwestwards for about 27 km (17 mi). The NW side of its mouth lies at the limit of Sermersooq Municipality, the Northeast Greenland National Park lying beyond Cape Biot. To the east lies the Wegener Peninsula and Cape Brown, beyond which lies Nathorst Fjord.

On most stretches of the shore mountains rise very steeply on both sides of the fjord culminating in sharp peaks. Most years the fjord is blocked with ice even in the summer.

Map of Northeastern Greenland

== See also ==
- Fleming Fjord Formation
- List of fjords of Greenland

== Bibliography ==
- Jens N. Lallensack, Hendrik Klein, Jesper Milàn, Oliver Wings, Octávio Mateus, and Lars B. Clemmensen. Sauropodomorph dinosaur trackways from the Fleming Fjord Formation of East Greenland: Evidence for Late Triassic sauropods, Acta Palaeontologica Polonica 62 (4), 2017: 833-843
