= Kempe Fjord =

Fjord in Greenland

- Kempes Fjord
- Location in Greenland
- Interactive map of Kempe Fjord
- Location: Arctic
- Coordinates: 72°48′N 25°50′W
- Ocean/sea sources: King Oscar Fjord; Davy Sound; Greenland Sea
- Basin countries: Greenland
- Max. length: 60 km (37 mi)
- Max. width: 7 km (4.3 mi)
- Settlements: 0

Kempe Fjord (Danish: Kempes Fjord) is a fjord in King Christian X Land, eastern Greenland.

Administratively it lies in the Northeast Greenland National Park area. This fjord is part of the King Oscar Fjord system.

== History ==
This fjord was named by a Swedish Arctic explorer Alfred Gabriel Nathorst after a Stockholm businessman Seth Michael Kempe (1857– 1946), during the Swedish Greenland Expedition in search of survivors of S. A. Andrée's Arctic balloon expedition of 1897. Kempe was one of Nathorst's most generous supporters and also a good friend of expedition surveyor Per Dusén.

In 1899, while first exploring King Oscar Fjord, Nathorst wanted to reach the sea through Davy Sound, which had been put on the map by William Scoresby in 1822, but the sound was blocked by ice. While travelling back north he found and mapped both this fjord branch, as well as the Segelsällskapet Fjord further south.

== Geography ==
This fjord is the northernmost of the western branches of the King Oscar Fjord. Its mouth opens at the western end of Ella Island, where the Narwhal Sound branches southeastwards. It extends roughly southwestwards for about 30 km (19 mi) until Cape Hedlund, from where the fjord divides into three branches:

- Dickson Fjord, extends to the WNW for another 30 km (19 mi). The terminus of the Hisingers Glacier is at its head.
- Röhss Fjord, extending to the WSW for about 25 km (16 mi). At its head there is a sloping valley.
- Rhedin Fjord, extending to the SSW for about 15 km (9.3 mi). The terminus of the Wahlenberg Glacier is at its head.

The northwestern shore of the fjord forms the southern shore of Suess Land, and the southeastern, the northern shore of Lyell Land. Gletscherland lies to the west of the fjord system.

The Argand Glacier has its terminus in the fjord.

Map of Northeastern Greenland

== See also ==
- List of fjords of Greenland
