= Mount Lugano =

Mountain in Northeast Greenland National Park, Greenland

- Location within Greenland

Highest point
- Elevation: 2,194 m (7,198 ft)
- Coordinates: 72°48′N 27°27.1′W

Geography
- Location: Gletscherland

Climbing
- First ascent: 1934 - Eugen Wegmann and Augusto Gansser

Mount Lugano (Danish: Lugano Bjerg) is a mountain in eastern Greenland. Administratively it is part of the Northeast Greenland National Park.

== History ==
This peak was named Monte Lugano, after the town of Lugano in Switzerland, by Swiss geologist Eugen Wegmann (1896 - 1982) at the time of Lauge Koch's 1931-34 Three-year Expedition to East Greenland. Louise Boyd had previously used the temporary names "Scoop Mountain" and "C. Mountain" in her 1931 Greenland expedition.

Mount Lugano was first climbed by Eugen Wegmann, together with fellow Swiss geologist Augusto Gansser (1910 – 2012), on 11 August 1934. According to an interview he gave in 1939 to the magazine Illustrazione Ticinese, Wegmann allegedly was overcome by nostalgia for pleasant Lugano, standing hungry and thirsty in the harsh polar weather at the summit of the mountain. Hence the name.

== Geography ==
Mount Lugano is the highest point of Gletscherland. It is a roughly 2,194 m (7,198 ft) high peak that rises in the northern part of Gletscherland, near the southern shore of Dickson Fjord. The summit of Mount Lugano has a concave shape topped by an ice cap that is apparent when viewed from Bocksrietdal in the west, across the Hisinger Glacier.

Map of Northeastern Greenland

== See also ==
- List of mountains in Greenland
