= Gletscherland =

Peninsula in Greenland

- Map of Northeastern Greenland

- Location within Greenland

Geography
- Location: East Greenland
- Coordinates: 72°40′N 27°0′W
- Adjacent to: Dickson Fjord; Rhedin Fjord; Röhss Fjord
- Length: 55 km (34.2 mi)
- Width: 40 km (25 mi)
- Highest elevation: 2,194 m (7198 ft)
- Highest point: Mount Lugano

Administration
- Greenland (Denmark)
- Zone: Northeast Greenland National Park

Demographics
- Population: Uninhabited

Gletscherland, meaning "Glacier Land", is a peninsula in King Christian X Land, East Greenland. Administratively it is part of the Northeast Greenland National Park.

== History ==
This peninsula was named during the Three-year Expedition to East Greenland owing to it being largely glaciated. The name "Canton Land" has also been used.

== Geography ==
True to its name, Gletscherland is largely glaciated, with many ice caps and glaciers. It is located southwest of Suess Land, northwest of Lyell Land, and southeast of Goodenoughland. The peninsula has a mountainous, Alpine terrain; Mount Lugano is Gletscherland's highest point. The Cecilia Nunatak rises to the southwest.

It is bounded in the northwest by the Hisinger Glacier, in the north and northeast by the Dickson Fjord, in the southeast by the Rhedin Fjord, in the south by the Wahlenberg Glacier and to the west it is connected to the mainland. The Röhss Fjord and the valley at its head, almost divide the peninsula in two from ENE to WSW. All fjords are branches of the Kempe Fjord.

== Bibliography ==
- A. K. Higgins, Jane A. Gilotti, M. Paul Smith (eds.), The Greenland Caledonides: Evolution of the Northeast Margin of Laurentia.
