= Norsketinden =

Mountain in Greenland

- Location within Greenland

Highest point
- Elevation: 2,756 m (9,042 ft)
- Coordinates: 72°8′10″N 25°3′20″W

Geography
- Location: Scoresby Land, Greenland
- Parent range: Stauning Alps

Climbing
- First ascent: 1954

Norsketinden is a mountain in the Stauning Alps, Eastern Greenland.

== Geography ==
Norsketinden is one of the highest mountains in the range. It rises roughly 12 km to the east of the shore of the Alpefjord —a branch of the Segelsällskapet Fjord, between the Vikingebrae and the Gully Glacier. Although according to available sources this mountain is a 2,870 metres (9,416 ft), 2,797 metres (9,177 ft), or 2,789-metre-high (9,150 ft) peak. it appears as a 2,756-metre-high (9,042 ft) peak in Google Earth.

== Climbing history ==
Norsketinden was first climbed by a Danish–Norwegian expedition on 7 August 1954. The names 'Erik Rødes Tinde' or 'Eirik Raudes Tinde' —after Erik the Red, were proposed, but the peak was finally named Norsketinden.

== See also ==
- List of mountain peaks of Greenland
