= Dickson Fjord =

Fjord in Greenland

- Dicksons Fjord
- Location in Greenland
- Interactive map of Dickson Fjord
- Location: Arctic
- Coordinates: 72°50′N 26°57′W
- Ocean/sea sources: Kempe Fjord; King Oscar Fjord; Davy Sound; Greenland Sea
- Basin countries: Greenland
- Max. length: 35 km (22 mi)
- Max. width: 5 km (3.1 mi)
- Settlements: 0

Dickson Fjord (Danish: Dicksons Fjord) is a fjord in King Christian X Land, eastern Greenland.

Administratively, it lies in the Northeast Greenland National Park area. This fjord is part of the King Oscar Fjord system.

== History ==
This fjord was first surveyed in 1899 by Swedish Arctic explorer Alfred Gabriel Nathorst during the Swedish Greenland Expedition in search of survivors of S. A. Andrée's Arctic balloon expedition of 1897. Nathorst named it after Swedish politician Robert Dickson (1843–1924), one of the financial backers of the venture.

In 1930 Norwegian ship Veslekari reached the head of Dickson Fjord and recorded a sounding of 568.75 m (1,866.0 ft), but sudden shoaling prevented the ship from anchoring.

On 16 September 2023, a significant landslide, consisting primarily of ice and rock, occurred in Dickson Fjord, triggering a 200-meter-high tsunami. However, the tsunami was not immediately observed due to a seiche formation. A seiche is a standing wave oscillating back and forth within a confined body of water, such as a fjord. In this case, the seiche phenomenon caused the tsunami wave to be trapped and amplified within the fjord for approximately nine days, resulting in unusual seismic readings worldwide.

== Geography ==
Dickson Fjord is in the northernmost area of the King Oscar Fjord system. It is the biggest branch of Kempe Fjord. Its mouth opens on the northern side at the western end of the fjord, where there is a junction of three branches, the other two being Röhss Fjord and Rhedin Fjord. It runs roughly northwestwards for about 15 km (9.3 mi) and then roughly to the WSW for 20 km (12 mi). The Hisinger Glacier has its terminus at the fjord's head and the Fulach Glacier in the northern shore.

High mountains surround Dickson Fjord, and its shores are very steep. The head is located in the isthmus area of Suess Land, only about 6 kilometres (3.7 mi) south of the head of Kjerulf Fjord. The northern shore of the fjord is part of Suess Land, and the southwestern of Gletscherland, where the highest point, about 2,194 m (7,198 ft) high Mount Lugano (Lugano Bjerg), rises in the vicinity.

Map of Northeastern Greenland

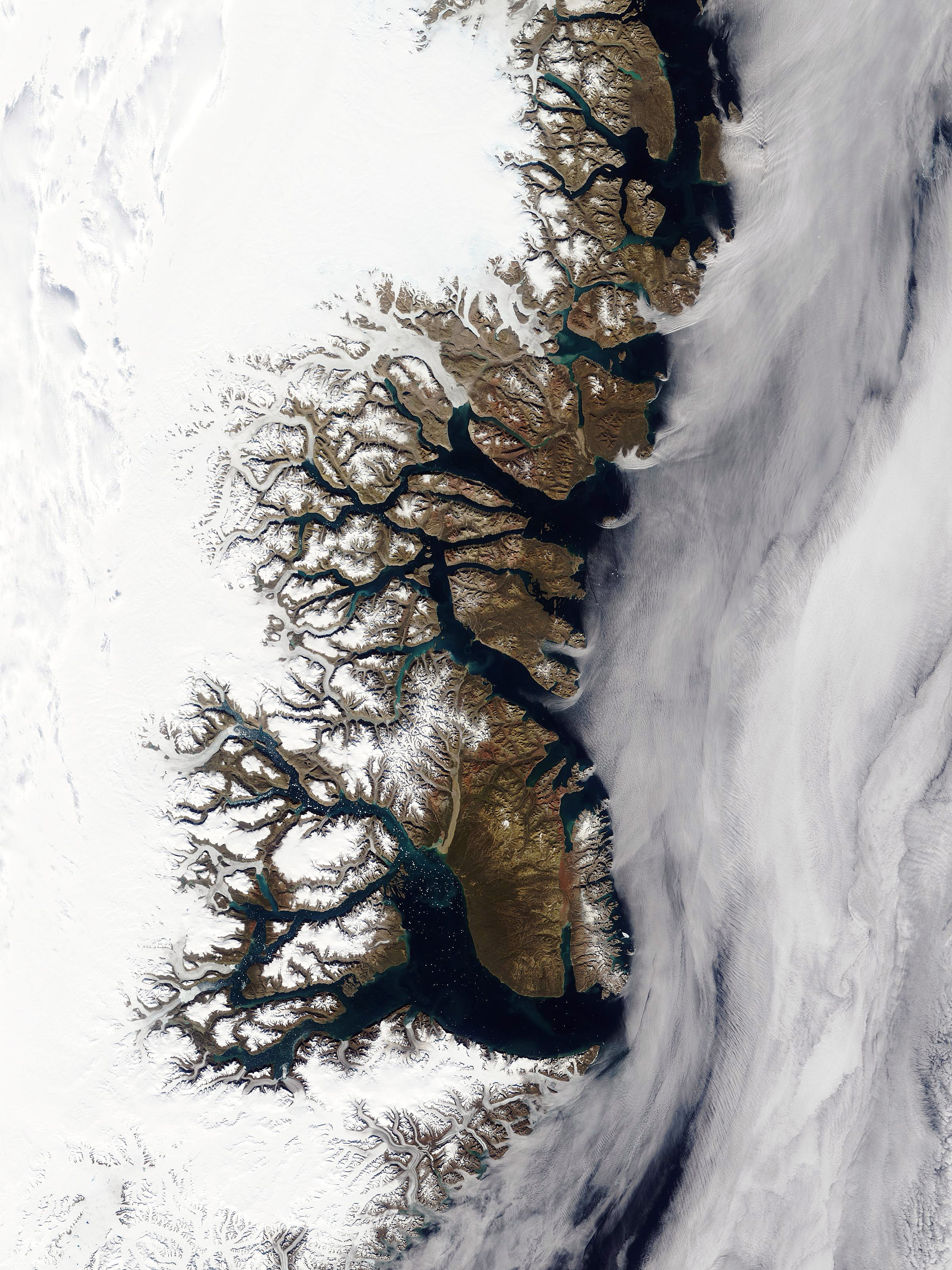
East Greenland Terra/MODIS satellite image

== See also ==
- List of fjords of Greenland
