= Röhss Fjord =

Fjord in Greenland

- Location
- Location: Arctic
- Coordinates: 72°44.0′N 26°37.0′W
- Part of: King Oscar Fjord system
- Ocean/sea sources: Greenland Sea
- Basin countries: Greenland
- Max. length: 28 km (17 mi)
- Max. width: 3 km (1.9 mi)

Röhss Fjord (also spelled Røhss Fjord, Röhs Fjord or Røss Fjord) is a fjord in northeastern Greenland. It lies within the Northeast Greenland National Park.

== Geography ==
Röhss Fjord runs east–west and almost divides Gletscherland into two parts. It is one of three branches at the western end of Kempe Fjord, part of the King Oscar Fjord system; the other two are Dickson Fjord and Rhedin Fjord. The fjord is about 28 km (17 mi) long and 3 km (1.9 mi) wide, and lies roughly 297 km (185 mi) north-northwest of Ittoqqortoormiit.

== History ==
The fjord was named Röhss' Fjord by Alfred Gabriel Nathorst's 1899 expedition. The name honours Johan Anders August Röhss (1836–1904), a Swedish merchant who contributed 5,000 kronor to the expedition's finances. Röhss was a successful merchant and an important figure in the social life of Gothenburg.
