= Ella Island =

Island in Greenland

Ella Ø (Danish)
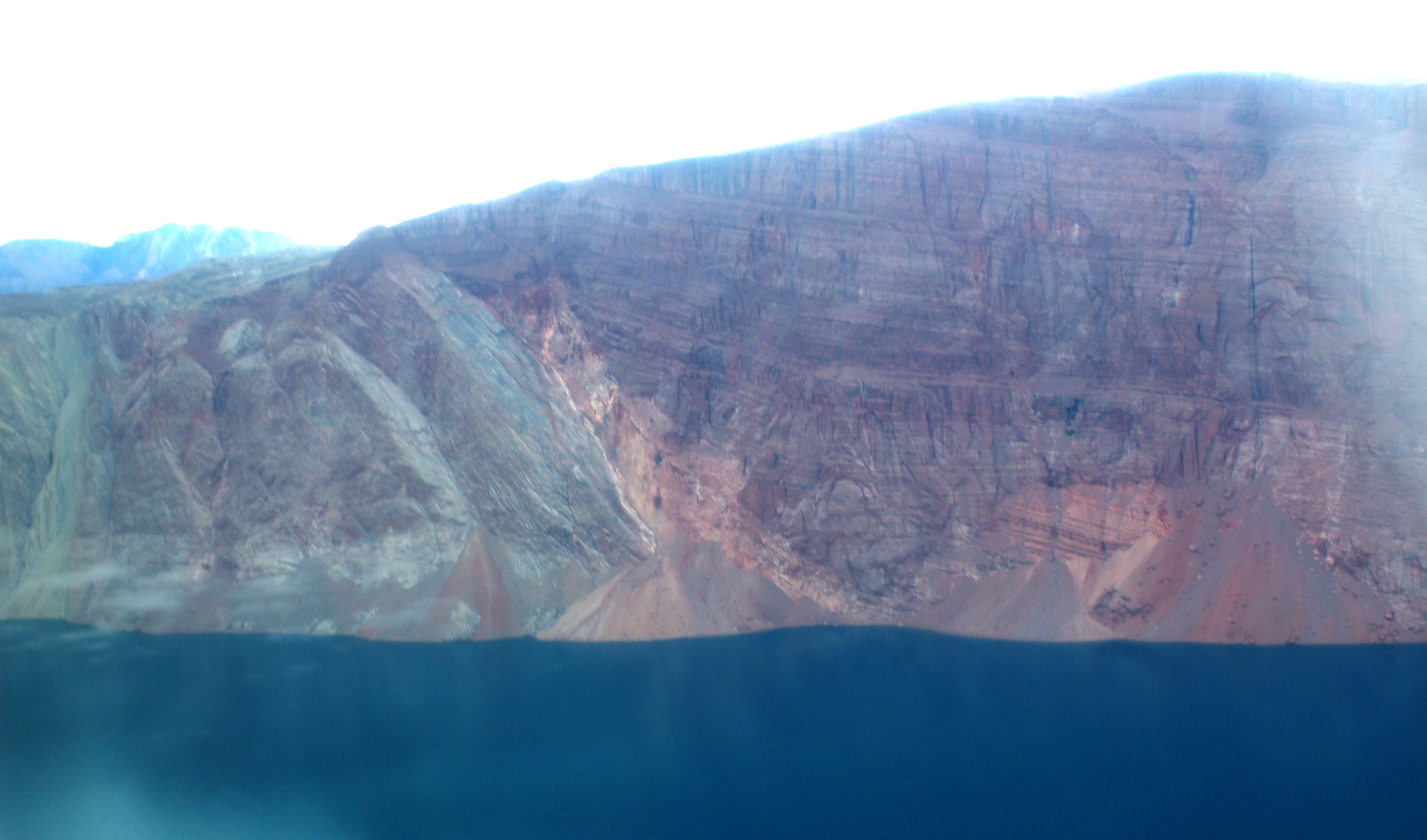
- The southwestern side of Ella Island in August 2007. An onlap of Devonian sandstone (right) on folded Cambrian-to-Ordovician rocks (left) is visible.

- Location within Greenland

Geography
- Location: Greenland Sea
- Coordinates: 72°51′N 25°00′W

Administration
- Greenland
- Zone: Northeast Greenland National Park

Demographics
- Population: 0

Ella Island (Danish: Ella Ø) is an island in eastern Greenland, within Northeast Greenland National Park. It was established in 1941 to enforce Danish sovereignty in Greenland. It is home of the legendary Sirius Dog Sled Patrol.

== Geography ==
Ella Island is located at the mouth of Kempe Fjord in the northern end of King Oscar Fjord. To the east lie the larger Traill Island and Geographical Society Island. Off its northern end lie Maria Island and Ruth Island.

The island has an area of 143.6 square kilometres (55.4 sq mi) and a shoreline of 59.6 kilometres (37 mi). Ella Island is separated from the western shore of the fjord by the Narwhal Sound.

The Sirius Dog Sled Patrol maintains a small base on the northern coast of the island which is staffed only in summer.

Map of northeastern Greenland

== History ==
The Danish geologist and Arctic explorer Lauge Koch (1892–1964) had a cabin on the northern side of the island named "Eagle's Nest." The Danish botanist and evolutionary biologist Thorvald Sørensen (1902–1973) spent the years 1931–1935 on the island. His observations formed the basis for his doctoral thesis in 1941.

During World War II, U.S. military forces had a radio, weather, and sledge patrol station called "Bluie East Four" on the island.

In 1971 a meteorite was found on Ella Island, classified as a L-6 chondrite.

On 16 September 2023 a 25 million tonne rock-slide caused an unwitnessed tsunami in Dickson Fjord, reaching a height of 200 meters and then a 7-meter-high seiche (standing wave) that sloshed back and forth many times in the fjord for 9 days with a period of 92 seconds. The vibration was measured by seismologists around the Earth as the first time a planet-wide "tone" had been registered.

The tsunami also struck the northern part of Ella Island 73 kilometres away with a 4-meter wave, penetrating 50 metres (55 yd) inland and devastating the Sirius Dog Sled Patrol station, washing some of it into the sea. The station was closed for the winter, and no one was present when the wave hit. The cruise ship Ocean Albatros arrived on the scene on 17 September and contacted the Joint Arctic Command with the first report of the damage. On 19 September, personnel from the Sirius Dog Sled Patrol and the Royal Danish Navy patrol vessel HDMS Knud Rasmussen began clean-up and salvage work at the site, which they completed by 21 September despite a 20 September warning by officials to ships in the area to avoid putting crew members or passengers ashore because of a risk of additional tsunamis.

== See also ==
- List of islands of Greenland
