= Niviarsiat (Northeast Greenland National Park) =

Mountain in Northeast Greenland National Park, Greenland

- Location within Greenland

Highest point
- Elevation: 837 m (2,746 ft)
- Coordinates: 73°03′53″N 25°13′30″W

Geography
- Location: Suess Land, NE Greenland

Niviarsiat is a mountain in King Christian X Land, Northeast Greenland. Administratively it is part of the Northeast Greenland National Park zone.

== Geography ==
This mountain rises at the NE end of Suess Land in a bend of the Antarctic Sound, a southern branch of Kaiser Franz Joseph Fjord. It was named by Lauge Koch during his 1926–27 expedition to East Greenland.

== See also ==
- List of mountains in Greenland
