= King Oscar Fjord =

Fjord in Greenland

- Kong Oscar Fjord
- Location within Greenland
- Interactive map of King Oscar Fjord
- Coordinates: 72°22′N 24°00′W
- Ocean/sea sources: Greenland Sea
- Basin countries: Greenland
- Max. length: 110 km (68 mi)
- Max. width: 25 km (16 mi)

King Oscar Fjord (Danish: Kong Oscar Fjord; Greenlandic: Kangerluk Kong Oscar) is a fjord in East Greenland, marking the northern border of the Scoresby Land Peninsula.

It was named by A.G. Nathorst on his 1899 expedition as Konung Oscars Fjord for Oscar II, King of Sweden from 1872 to 1907 and of Norway from 1872 until 1905.

== Geography ==
King Oscar Fjord is a major fjord system in NE Greenland. The main fjord is 10–25 km wide, bounded by Traill Island and Geographical Society Island in the east. In the inner and northern end of the fjord lies Ella Island. The Davy Sound at the southeastern end connects with the Greenland Sea after extending for about 20 km in a NW/SE direction.

Lyell Land forms the western boundary and Scoresby Land with the Stauning Alps lies to the southwest.

The Antarctic Sound separates the Suess Land Peninsula and Ymer Island and connects with the Kaiser Franz Joseph Fjord system to the north.

Other branches of the King Oscar Fjord system are, on the western side:

- Kempe Fjord
  - Dickson Fjord
  - Röhss Fjord
  - Rhedin Fjord
- Narwhal Sound
- Segelsällskapet Fjord
  - Alpefjord
  - Forsblad Fjord
- Mesters Vig
- Antarctic Haven

On the eastern side:

- Sofia Sound
- Vega Sound
- Dream Bay (Drømmebugten)

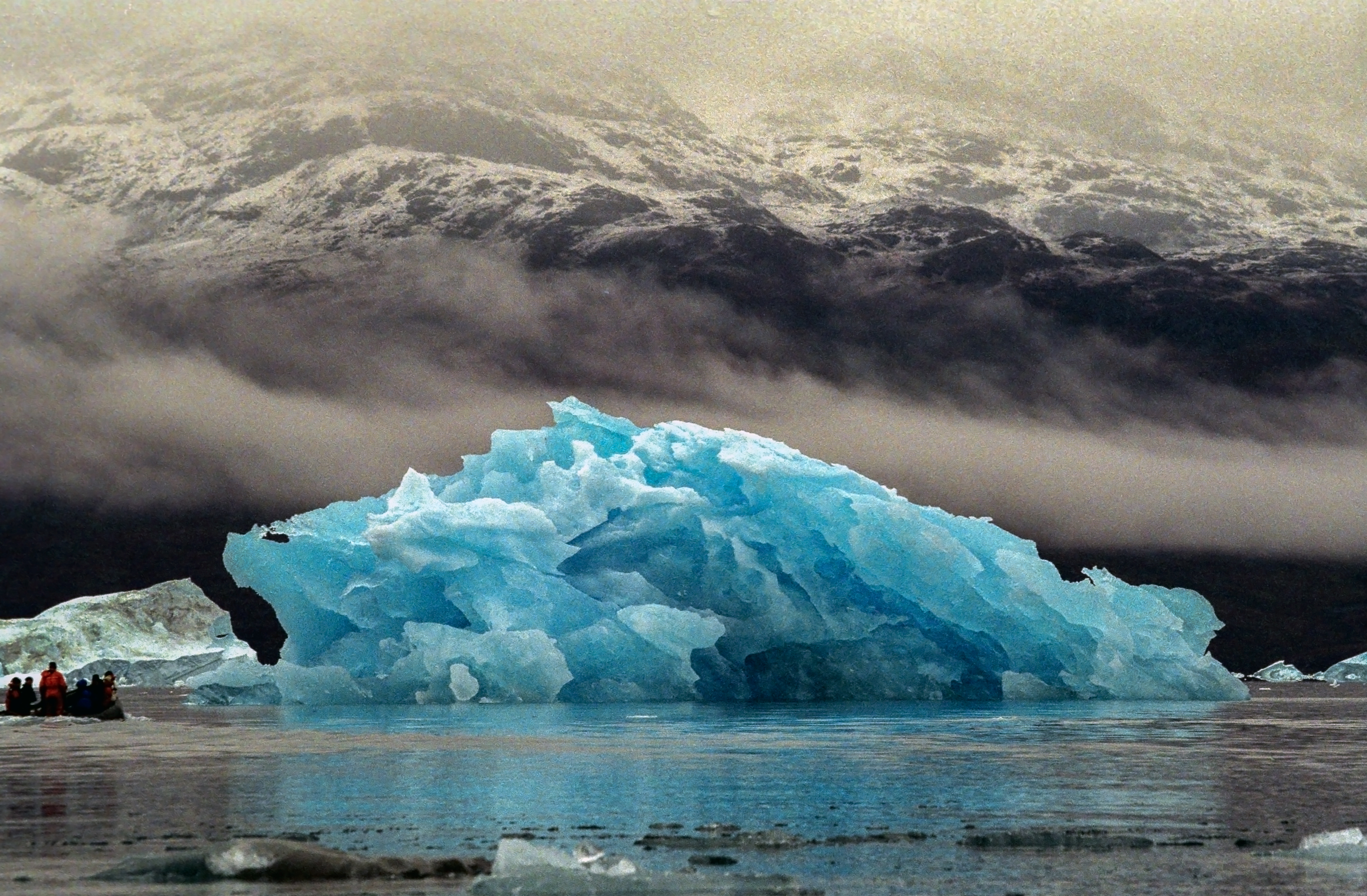
Ice floe near the shore in King Oscar Fjord

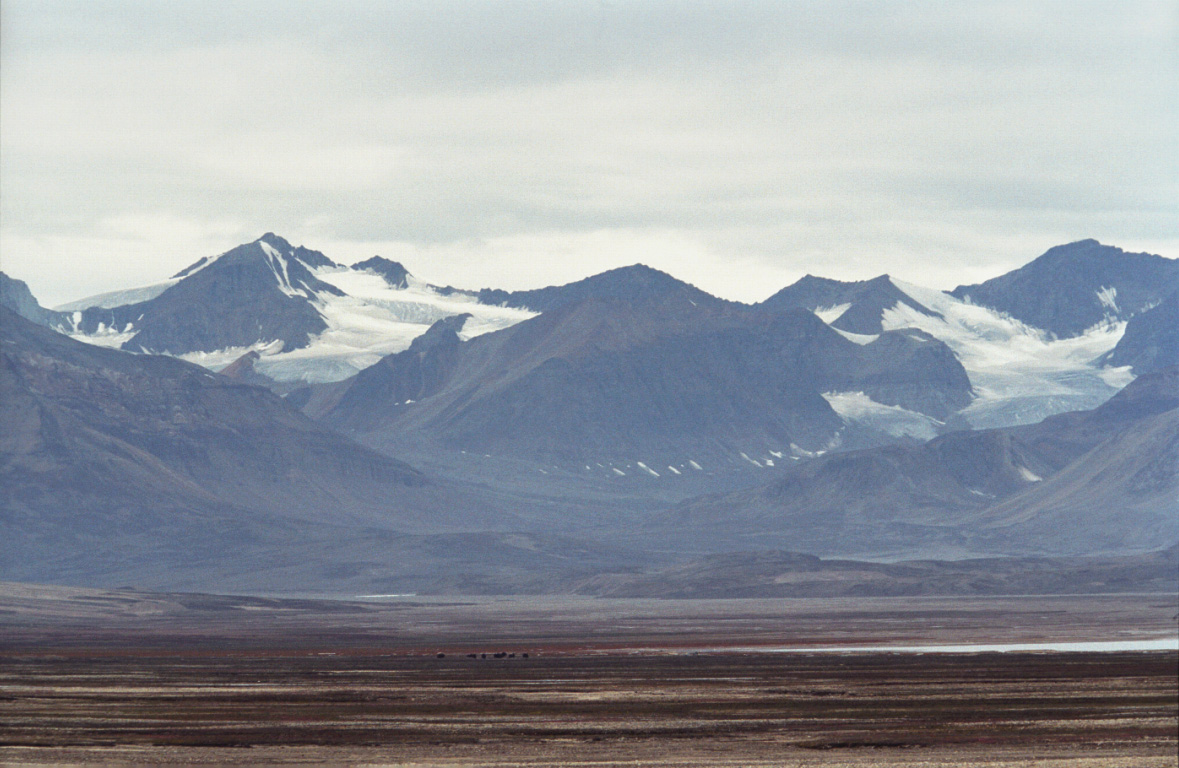
Antarctic Havn, a former trapper's cabin on the south shore of King Oscar Fjord

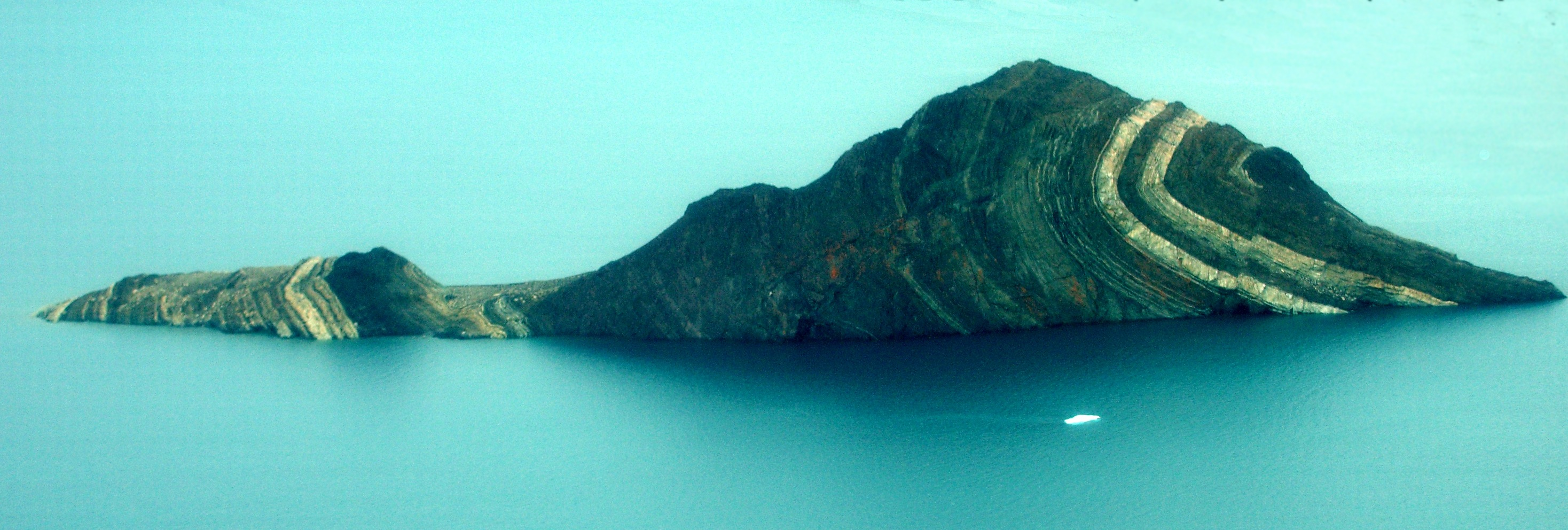
A fold on an island (at 72°28′0″N 24°41′49″W) resulting from the Caledonian orogeny, where Segelselskapets Fjord mouths into King Oscar Fjord

== See also ==
- List of fjords of Greenland
