= Cape Simpson (Greenland) =

Headland in Greenland

Cape Simpson Kap Simpson
- Cape
- Coordinates: 72°7′N 22°15′W
- Location: NE Greenland
- Offshore water bodies: Davy Sound; Greenland Sea

Area
  - Total: Arctic
- Elevation: 729 m (2,392 ft)

Cape Simpson (Danish: Kap Simpson) is a headland in the Greenland Sea, Northeast Greenland. Administratively it is part of the Northeast Greenland National Park.

== History ==
This headland was named "Cape Simpson" in 1822 by William Scoresby (1789 – 1857). Numerous remains of former Inuit habitation were found at that time in the area near the cape.

Materials for a Norwegian hunting station known as "Simpson Stranda" were brought to the area of the headland by Norwegian ship Veslekari in 1929, but the hut was never built. Another hut, "Kap Simpson Hytte", was built by the Sirius Dog Sled Patrol between 1955 and 1956.

== Geography ==
Cape Simpson is located in the Greenland Sea, north of Cape Biot on the opposite side of the mouth of Davy Sound.

Cape Simpson rises at the southeastern end of Traill Island, whose shore trending northwest of the cape forms the northeastern coast of Davy Sound. It is a conspicuous headland. The Vandyke Cliffs, steep and displaying multicolored strata, rise above the cape at a sheer angle right from the shore. Dream Bay (Drømmebugten) is located about 14 km (8.7 mi) WNW of the headland and larger Mountnorris Fjord to the northeast. Most of the years the sea around the cape is filled with ice, even in the summer.

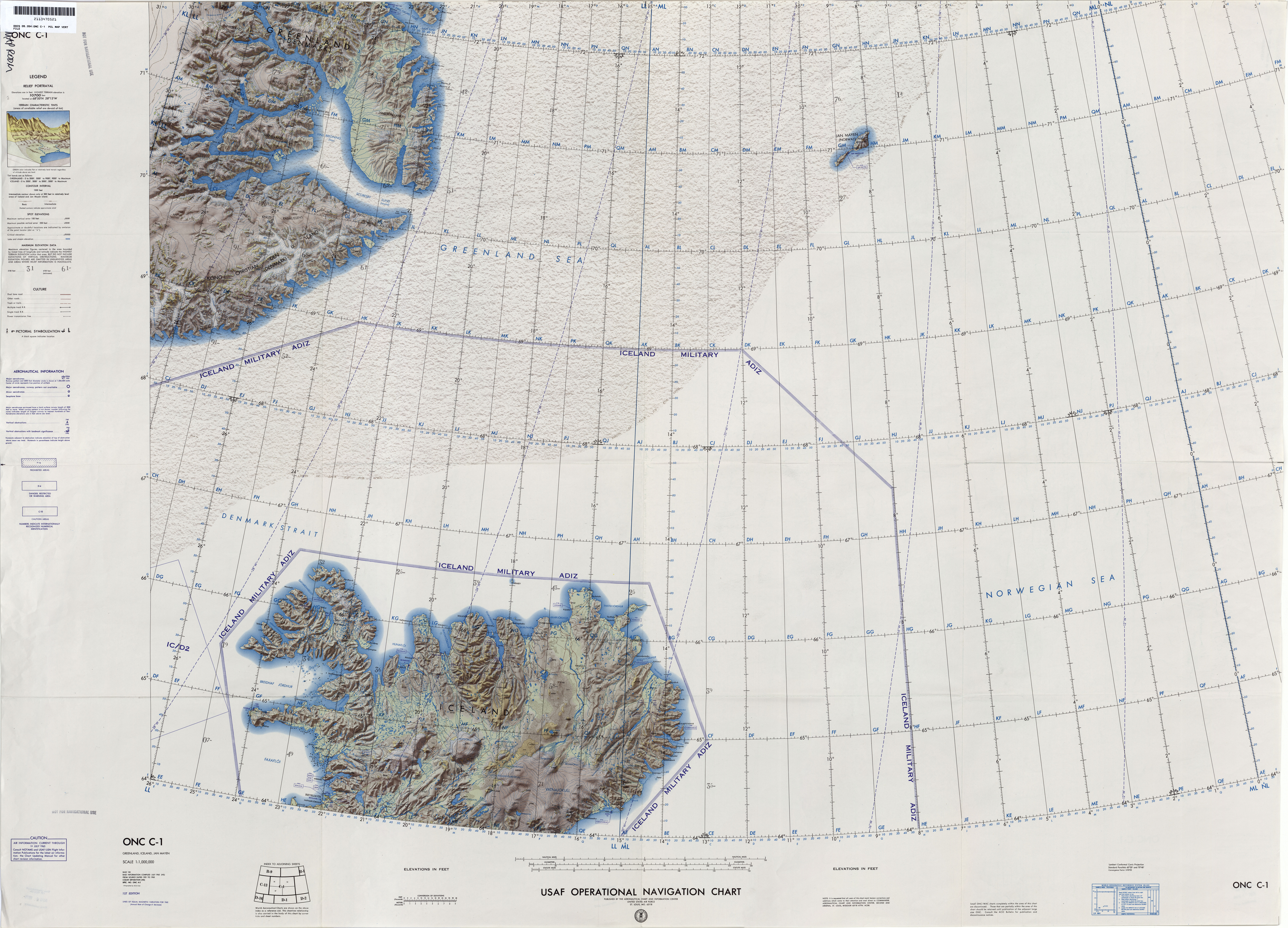
Map of NE Greenland and Iceland.

== Bibliography ==
- Wordie, J. M.; Manley, G.; White, P. F.; Johnson, D. McI. (1927). "The Cambridge Expedition to East Greenland in 1926". The Geographical Journal. 70 (3): 225–265. doi:10.2307/1781943. JSTOR 1781943.

== See also ==
- Geography of Greenland
