= Geographical Society Island =

Island in Greenland

Native name: Geografisk Samfund Ø
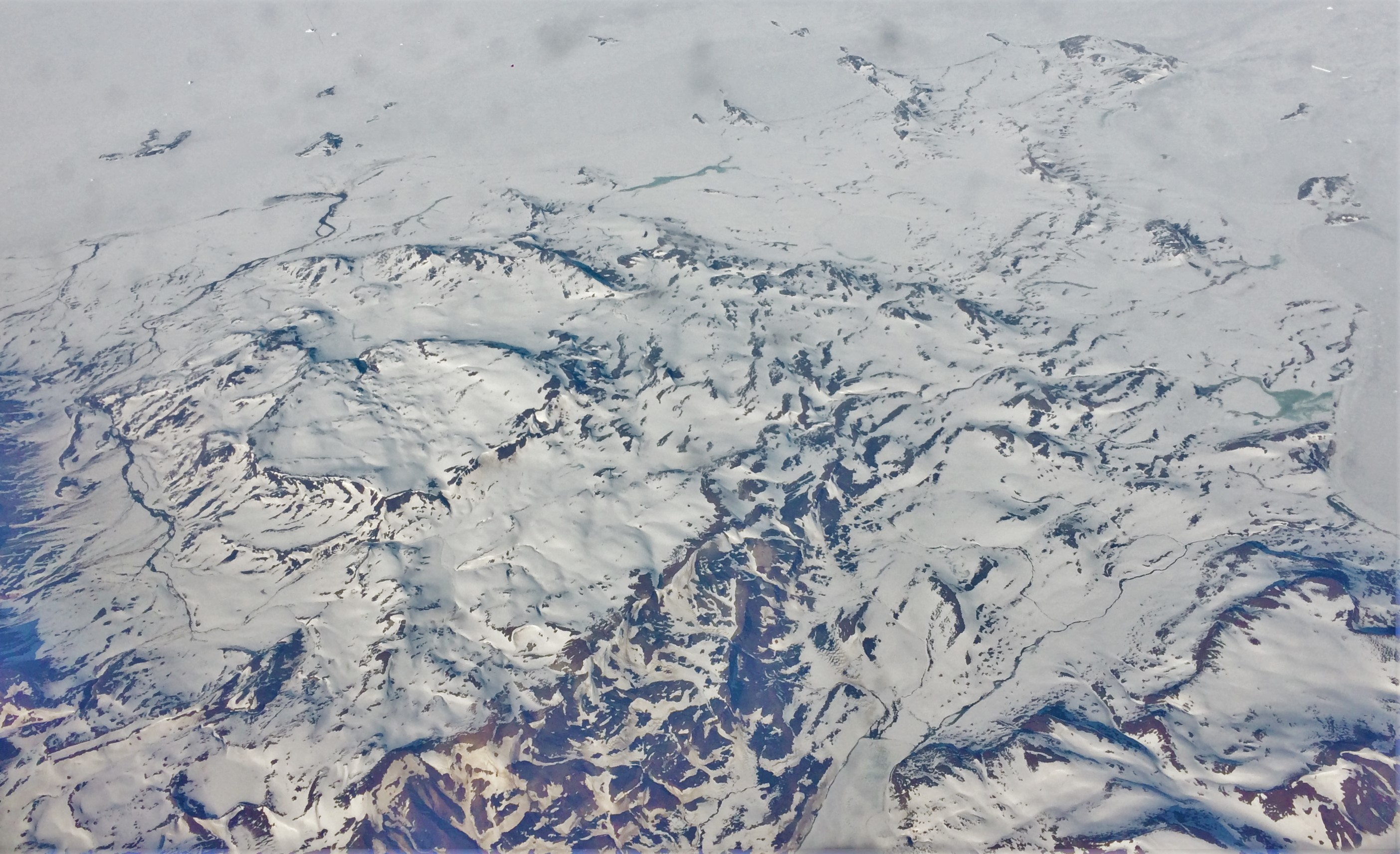
- View of Geographical Society Island

- Location of Geographical Society Island in Greenland
- Interactive map of Geographical Society Island
- Etymology: Named after the Royal Geographical Society

Geography
- Location: Greenland Sea
- Coordinates: 72°56′N 23°5′W
- Area: 1,717 km^{2} (663 sq mi)
- Area rank: 6th largest in Greenland; 231st largest in world
- Highest elevation: 1,730 m (5680 ft)
- Highest point: Svedenborg Bjerg

Administration
- Greenland
- Unincorporated area: NE Greenland National Park

Demographics
- Population: 0 (2021)
- Pop. density: 0/km^{2} (0/sq mi)
- Ethnic groups: none

Geographical Society Island (Danish: Geografisk Samfund Ø) is an island off Foster Bay in northeastern Greenland.

== Geography ==
The island has an area of 1,717 km^{2}. It is mountainous with Svedenborg Fjeld as the highest point at 1,730 m. To the north lies the mouth of the Kaiser Franz Joseph Fjord with Ymer Island to the NW and smaller Bantekoe Island to the NE in Foster Bay. To the south lies Traill Island, separated by a narrow sound, the Vega Sound. In the west, over King Oscar Fjord lies Ella Island.

Map of Northeastern Greenland

== Geology ==
From west to east, the rocks constituting the island are sandstone of roughly Devonian, Carboniferous and Cretaceous age, and some smaller areas with Triassic and Jurassic sandstone.

== See also ==
- List of islands of Greenland
