= Suess Land =

Peninsula in King Christian X Land, East Greenland

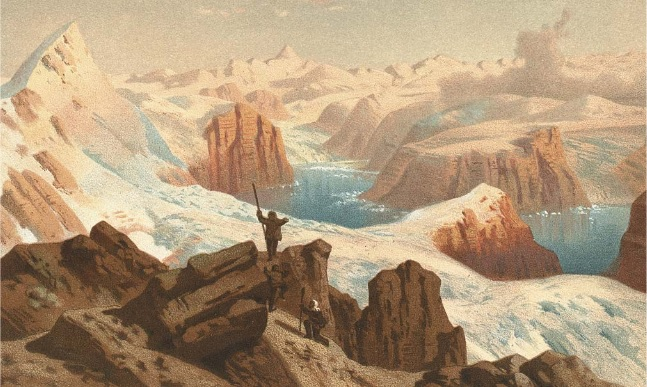
- Illustration of the 1870 discovery of Petermann Peak by Julius Payer, Ralph Copeland and Peter Ellinger after climbing onto Payer Peak in Suess Land.

- Location within Greenland

Geography
- Location: East Greenland
- Coordinates: 73°0′N 26°20′W
- Adjacent to: Kjerulf Fjord; Kaiser Franz Joseph Fjord; Antarctic Sound; Kempe Fjord; Dickson Fjord
- Length: 70 km (43 mi)
- Width: 50 km (31 mi)
- Highest elevation: 1,979 m (6493 ft)
- Highest point: Payer Peak

Administration
- Greenland (Denmark)
- Zone: Northeast Greenland National Park

Demographics
- Population: Uninhabited

Suess Land is a peninsula in King Christian X Land, East Greenland. Administratively it is part of the Northeast Greenland National Park.

== History ==
This peninsula was named by A.G. Nathorst after Austrian geologist Eduard Suess (1831–1914) at the time of his 1899 venture searching for traces of the lost Andrée expedition. Nathorst had previously translated a book by Eduard Suess into Swedish.

== Geography ==
Suess Land has a mountainous, Alpine terrain. It is located west of Ymer Island, south of Andree Land, north of Lyell Land and northeast of Gletscherland.

It is bounded in the west by Kjerulf Fjord, in the north by Kaiser Franz Joseph Fjord, in the northeast by the Antarctic Sound, in the east by the King Oscar Fjord, in the south by the Kempe Fjord and the Dickson Fjord. The peninsula is attached to Goodenough Land by a narrow isthmus in the southwest.

There are several glaciers in the peninsula, including the Fulach Glacier, the Sonklar Glacier and the Hisinger Glacier that has its terminus at the southwestern end.

Map of Northeastern Greenland
