= 2023 Greenland landslide =

Landslide in northeastern Greenland

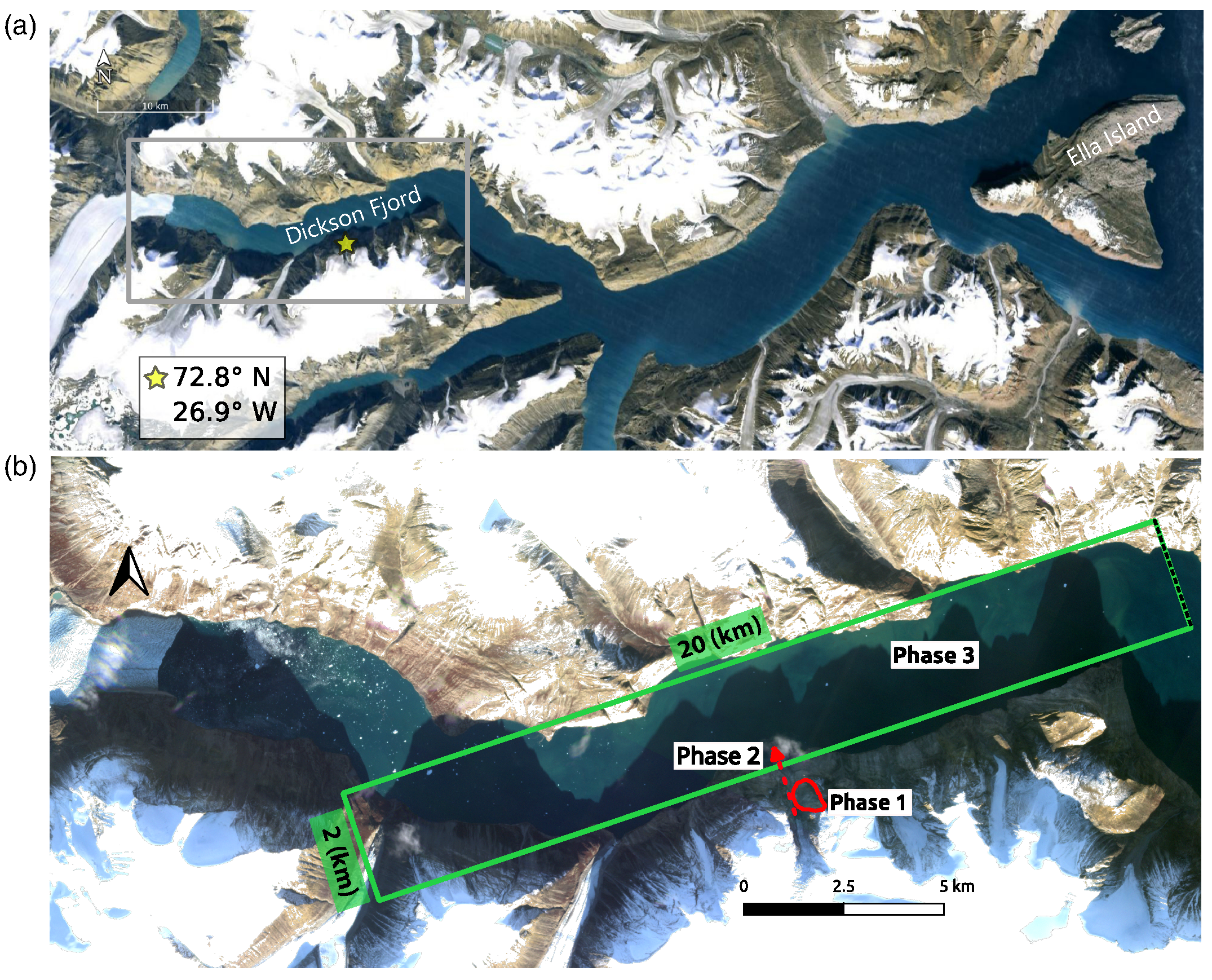
- Aerial overview of the location of the landslide and tsunami

- 2023 Greenland landslide (Greenland)
- Date: September 16, 2023
- Time: 12:35 (UTC)
- Location: Dickson Fjord, Greenland; 72°48′N 26°54′W
- Cause: Landslide

On September 16, 2023, a massive landslide occurred in Dickson Fjord, eastern Greenland. Greenland, being highly sensitive to rising temperatures, has experienced accelerated glacial retreat and destabilization in recent years, making landslides more frequent and severe. The event started a seismic vibration that was detectable around the world for nine days.

== Background ==
On September 16, 2023 at 12:35 UTC, a 25.5×10^{6} m^{3} (33.4×10^{6} cu yd) rockslide occurred on the slope of Dickson Fjord in Northeast Greenland. The rockslide impacted a gully glacier, leading to a rock and ice avalanche that entered the fjord causing a tsunami up to 200-metre-high (660 ft) and subsequent waves up to 110 m high, with observable runup up to 100 km (62 mi) away. Svennevig et al. (2024) recreated the dynamics of the landslide using the available seismic data and estimate it achieved a peak velocity of 42 meters per second. The initial failure triggering the landslide was 150 m thick, 480 m wide and 600 m long, made of a large block of metamorphic rock. The wave was caught in a narrow fjord which caused the wave to continue to slosh back and forth off the walls, creating a large seiche whose vibrations were observable on seismic stations worldwide for up to nine days as an unprecedented very long period seismic event. The event was picked up all over the world, and was first confused with an earthquake.

Greenland's geography and climate make it prone to natural disasters, particularly landslides and tsunamis caused by glacial activity and permafrost thaw. The region has seen an increase in the frequency and severity of such events as a result of the ongoing warming of the Arctic. Rising temperatures are accelerating the melting of ice sheets and glaciers, as well as causing permafrost, which stabilizes mountainous terrain, to thaw. This has increased the instability of Greenland's coastal regions.

== See also ==
- Global warming potential
- Arctic sea ice decline
- Tsunami

== Sources ==
This article incorporates text by Svennevig, K., Hicks, S., Lecocq, T., Mangeney, A., Hibert, C., Korsgaard, N., Lucas, A., Keiding, M., Marboeuf, A., Schippkus, S., Rysgaard, S., Boone, W., Gibbons, S., Cook, K., Glimsdal, S., Løvholt, F., Spagnolo, M., Assink, J., Harcourt, W., and Malet, J.-P. and the VLPGreenland available under the CC BY 4.0 license.

This article incorporates text by Angela Carrillo‐Ponce, Sebastian Heimann, Gesa M. Petersen, Thomas R. Walter, Simone Cesca, Torsten Dahm available under the CC BY 4.0 license.
