= Nathorstbreen =

Glacier in Svalbard, Norway

Coordinates: 77°20′00″N 16°24′06″E

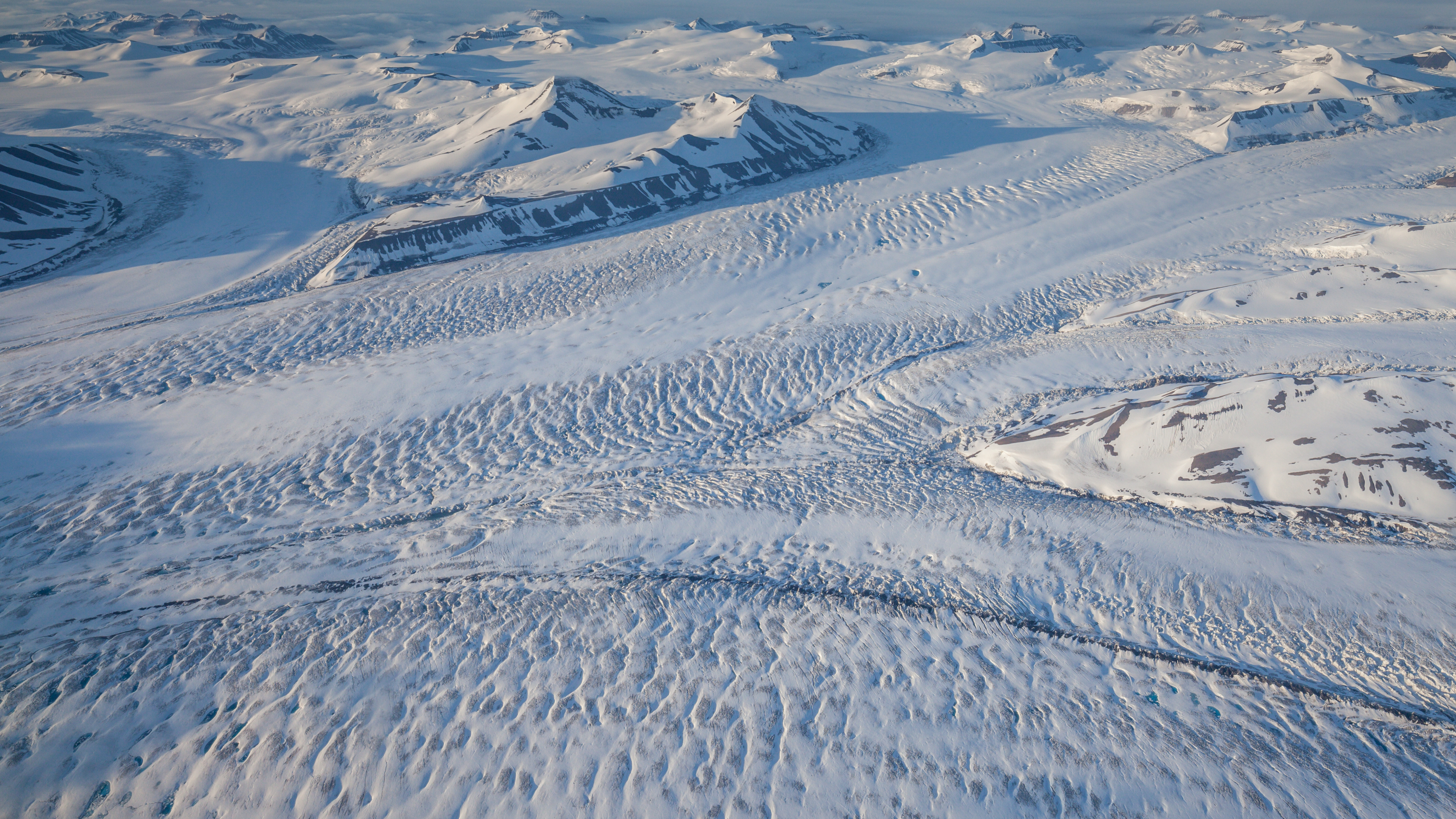
Nathorst glacier, Svalbard, in midnight sun

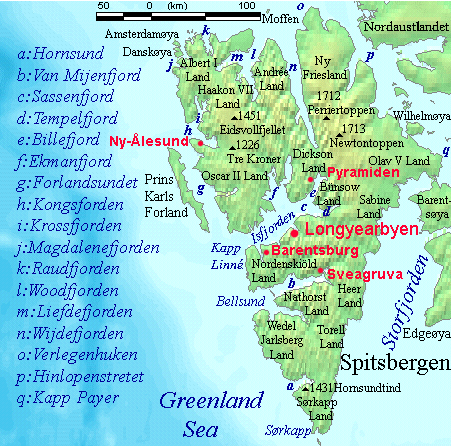
Nathorstbreen is a glacier located on the southern part of Spitsbergen, emptying into Van Keulenfjorden.

Nathorstbreen is a glacier on Spitsbergen, Svalbard. It has a length of about 35 kilometres (22 mi), and debouches into Van Keulenfjorden. It has several side glaciers. The glacier is named after Swedish polar explorer Alfred Gabriel Nathorst. A former name of the glacier was Leirbreen.
