= Antarctic Sound, Greenland =

Body of water in Greenland

Antarctic Sound
- Antarctic Sund
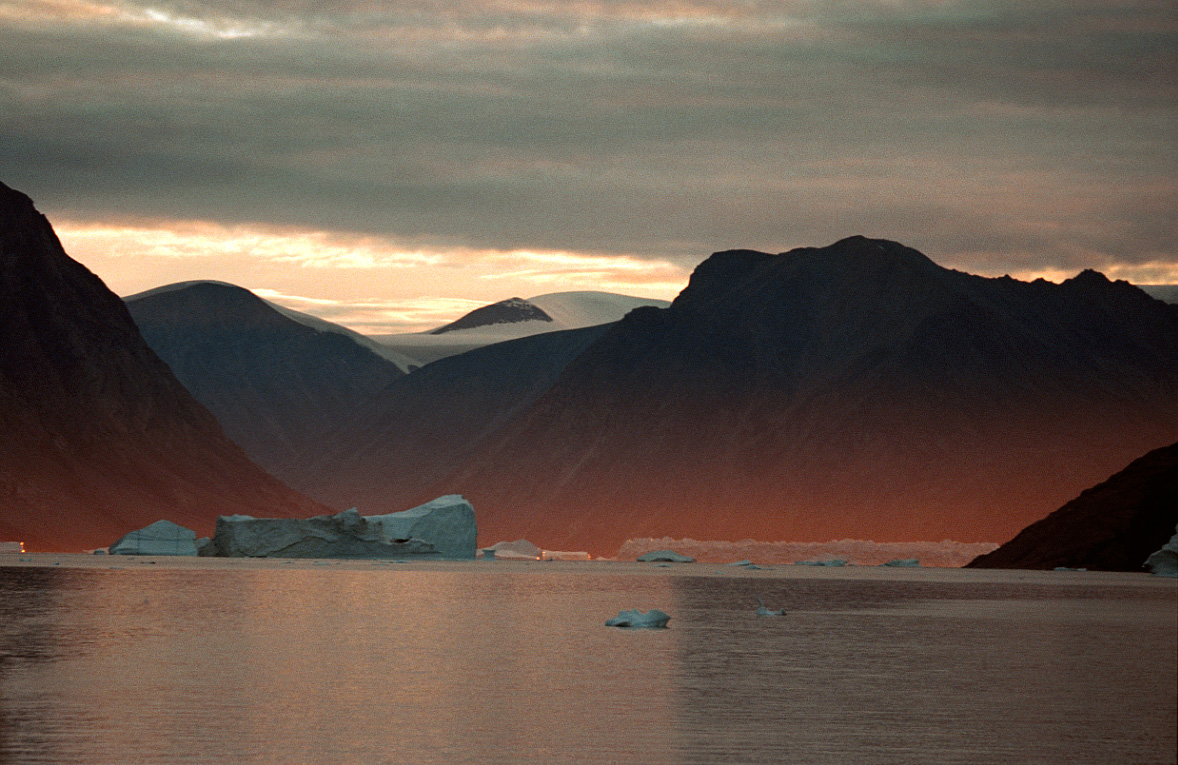
- View of the Antarctic Sound

- Location within Greenland
- Location: NE Greenland
- Coordinates: 73°6′N 25°24′W
- Part of: Arctic Ocean
- Ocean/sea sources: Kaiser Franz Joseph Fjord; King Oscar Fjord; Greenland Sea
- Basin countries: Greenland
- Max. length: 30 km (19 mi)
- Max. width: 3 km (1.9 mi)
- Frozen: Most of the year

The Antarctic Sound (Danish: Antarctic Sund) is a sound in King Christian X Land, Northeast Greenland. Administratively it is part of the Northeast Greenland National Park zone.

== History ==
The sound was named by Alfred Gabriel Nathorst after his ship Antarctic, on which he found and first mapped this fjord branch in 1899 during the Swedish Greenland Expedition in search of survivors of S. A. Andrée's Arctic balloon expedition of 1897.

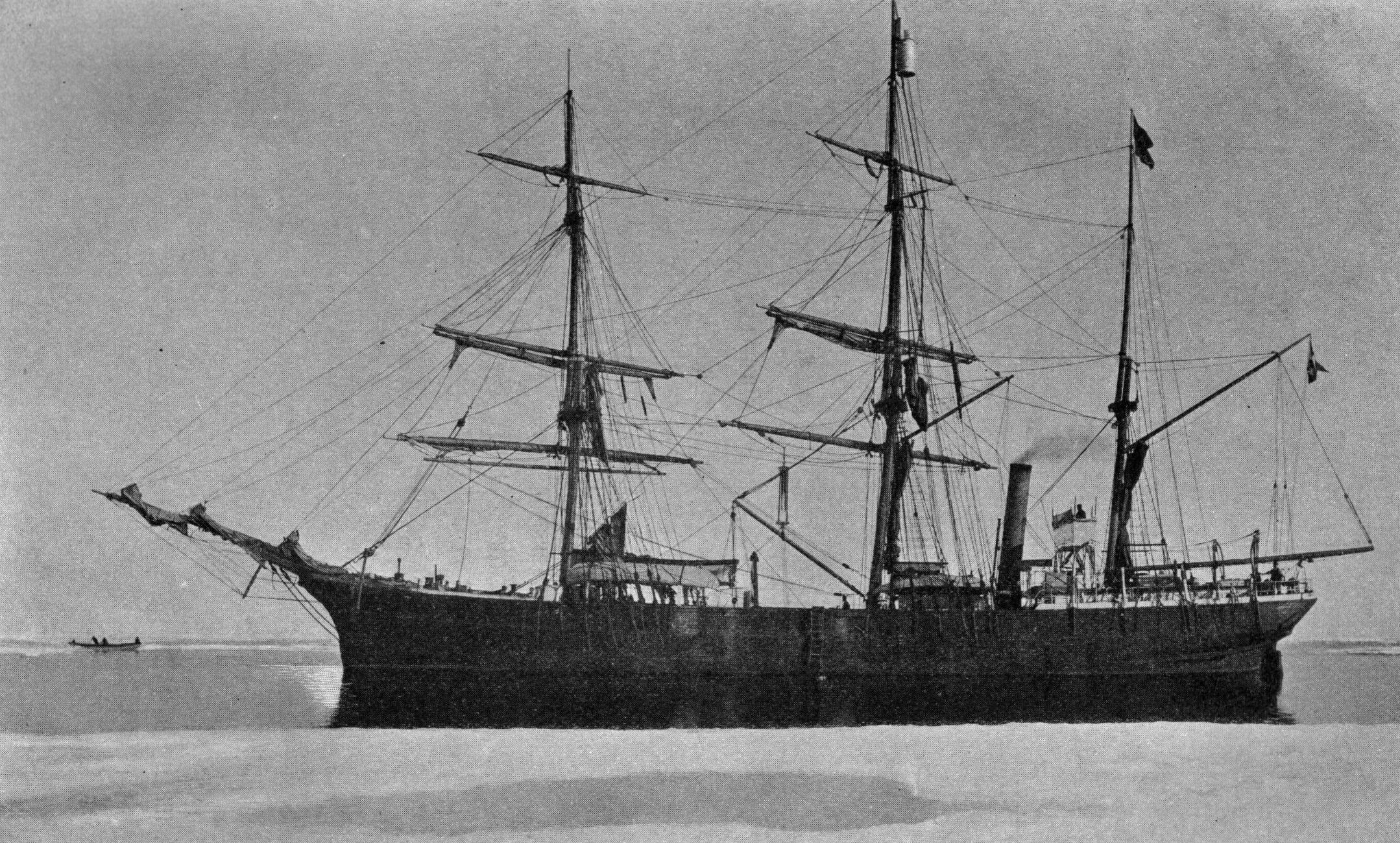
SS Antarctic, the ship after which the fjord was named.

== Geography ==
It is a fjord forming a channel that runs roughly from northwest to southeast between the southern shore of mid Kaiser Franz Joseph Fjord to the north and the head of King Oscar Fjord to the south. Its minimum width is 3 km.

The Antarctic Sound separates the northeastern shore of Suess Land —part of the Greenland mainland— from the southwestern shore of Ymer Island. Ruth Island lies off the southeastern mouth of the sound.

Map of Northeastern Greenland

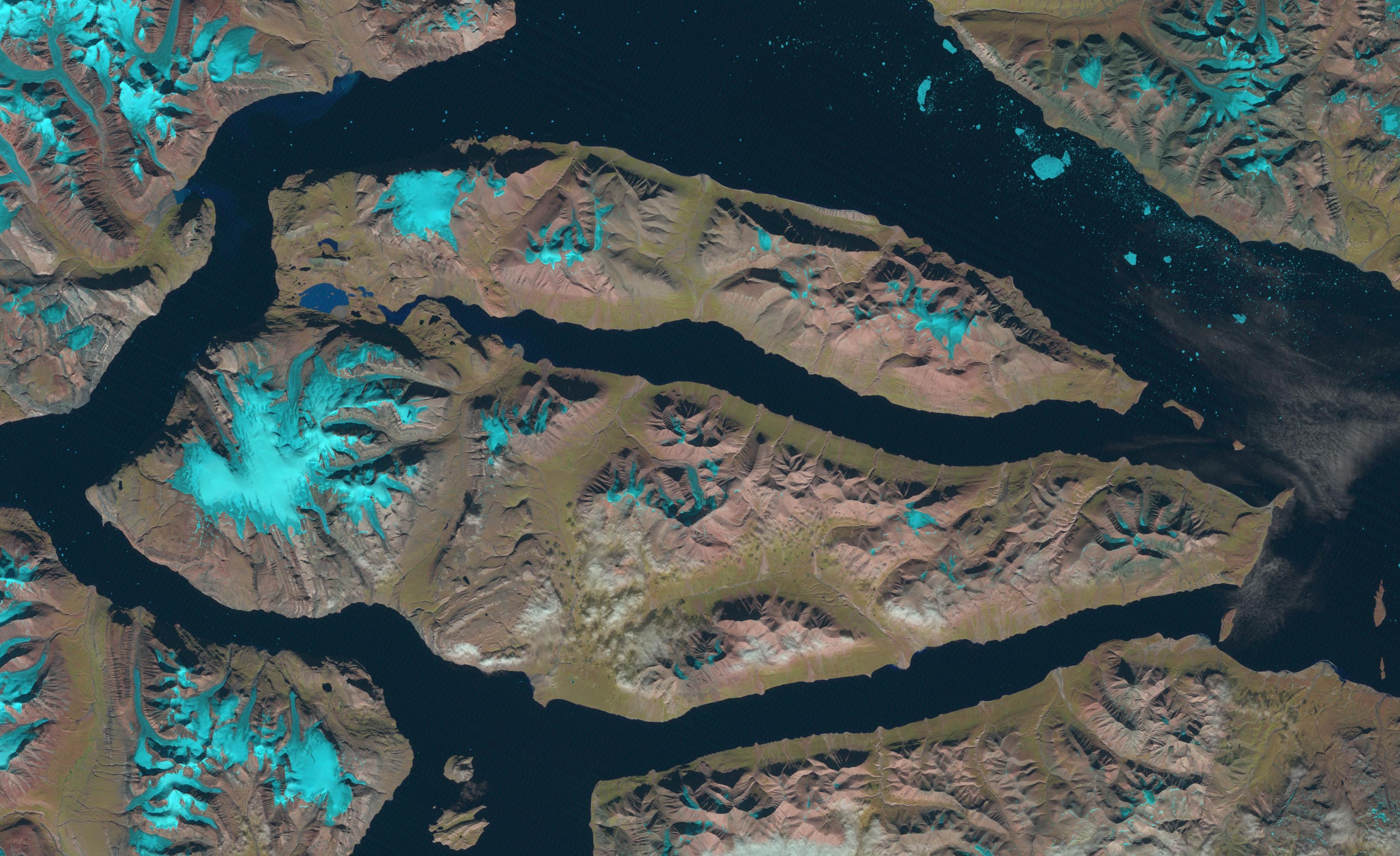
Landsat satellite image of Ymer Island with the Antarctic Sound in the bottom left corner.

== See also ==
- List of fjords of Greenland
- Niviarsiat, NE Greenland
