= Segelsällskapet Fjord =

Fjord in Greenland

- Location in Greenland
- Location: Arctic
- Coordinates: 72°26′N 25°0′W
- Ocean/sea sources: King Oscar Fjord; Greenland Sea
- Basin countries: Greenland
- Max. length: 20 km (12 mi)
- Max. width: 6 km (3.7 mi)
- Settlements: 0

Segelsällskapet Fjord (Danish: Segelsällskapets Fjord) is a fjord in King Christian X Land, eastern Greenland.

Administratively it lies in the Northeast Greenland National Park area. This fjord is part of the King Oscar Fjord system.

== History ==
This fjord was named by Swedish Arctic explorer Alfred Gabriel Nathorst after the Kungliga Svenska Segelsällskapet, the Royal Swedish Yacht Club during the Swedish Greenland Expedition in search of survivors of S. A. Andrée's Arctic balloon expedition of 1897.

In 1899, while first exploring King Oscar Fjord, Nathorst wanted to reach the sea through Davy Sound, which had been put on the map by William Scoresby in 1822, but the sound was blocked by ice. While travelling back north he found and mapped both this fjord branch, as well as the Kempe Fjord further north.

== Geography ==
This fjord is one of the western branches of the King Oscar Fjord. Its mouth opens between Cape Petersons and Cape Lagerberg in an area of small islands. It extends roughly southwestwards for 20 km (12 mi) until Cape Maeche, the NE point of Nathorst Land, from where the Alpefjord branches southwards for 38 km (24 mi), and the Forsblad Fjord continues roughly westwards for 32 km (20 mi). The fjord is mostly surrounded by high mountains rising steeply from its shore to heights of over 2,000 m (6,600 ft). Part of its northern flank marks the southern boundary of Lyell Land and the eastern shore of Alpefjord the western limit of the Stauning Alps and Scoresby Land.

The Sedgwick Glacier, the Linné Glacier and the Skjoldunge Glacier have their terminus in the fjord.

Map of Northeastern Greenland

== See also ==
- List of fjords of Greenland
