= Nunatak hypothesis =

Hypothesis regarding ecology in formerly glaciated regions

In biogeography, particularly phytogeography, the nunatak hypothesis about the origin of a biota in formerly glaciated areas is the idea that some or many species have survived the inhospitable period on icefree land such as nunataks. Its antithesis is the tabula rasa hypothesis, which posits that all species have immigrated into completely denuded land after the retreat of glaciers.

By the mid-20th Century, the nunatak hypothesis was widely accepted among biologists working on the floras of Greenland and Scandinavia. However, while modern geology has established the presence of ice-free areas during the last glacial maximum in both Greenland and Scandinavia, molecular techniques have revealed limited between-region genetic differentiation in many Arctic taxa, strongly suggesting a general capacity for long-distance dispersal among polar organisms. This does not directly disprove glacial survival. But it makes it less necessary as an explanation. Moreover, populations that survived on icefree land have probably in most cases been genetically flooded by postglacial immigrants.
