= Laestadites =

Laestadites Temporal range: Pliocene

Scientific classification
- Domain: Eukaryota
- Kingdom: Fungi
- Genus: †Laestadites; Mesch.
- Species: †L. nathorstii

Binomial name
- †Laestadites nathorstii Mesch.

Extinct genus of fungi

Laestadites is an extinct genus of fungi with unknown classification.
