= Scoresby Land =

Scoresby Land Scoresby Nuna (Greenlandic)
- Region
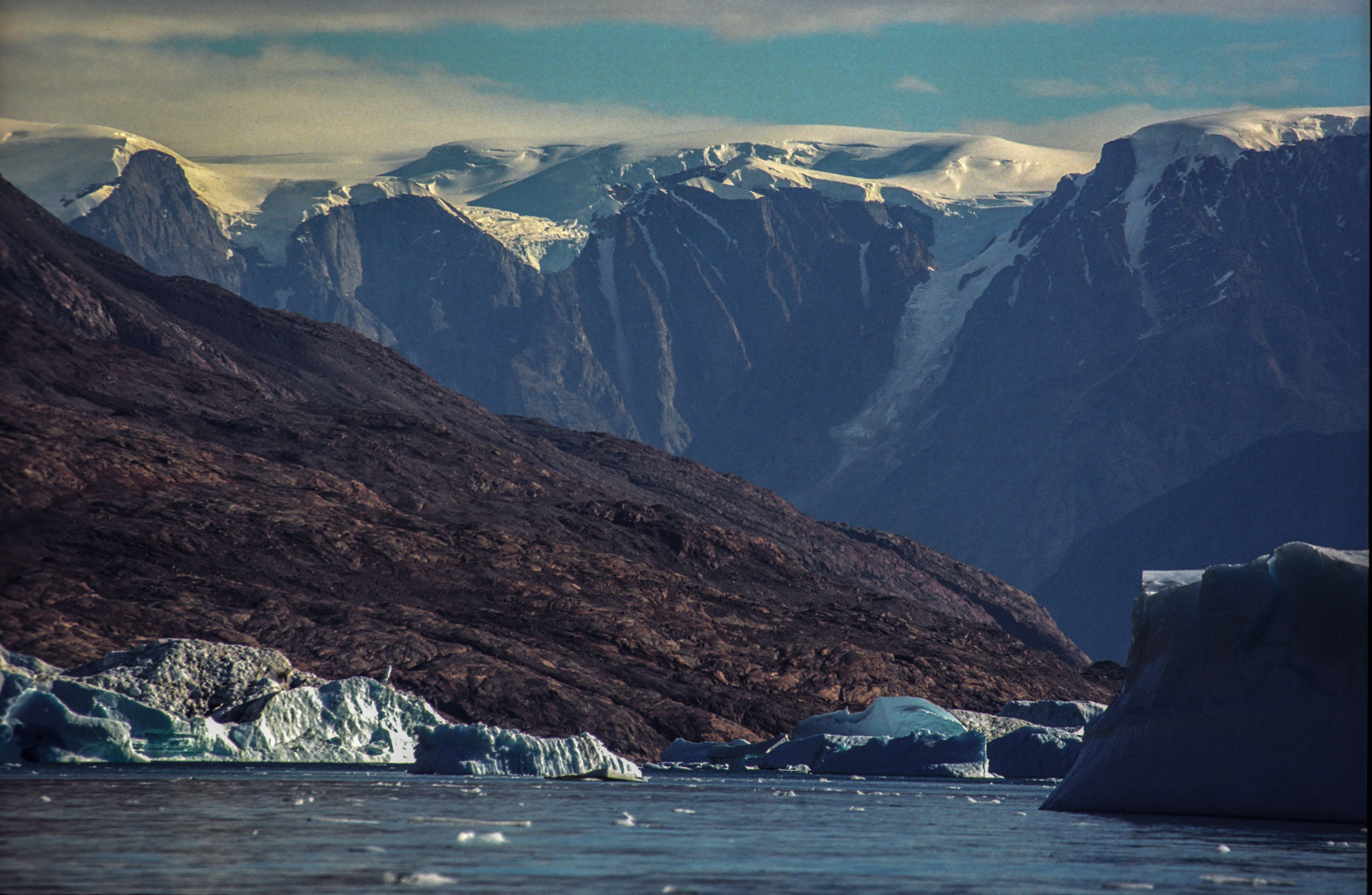
- Landscape of Scoresby Land: the Stauning Alps.

- Location of Scoresby Land
- Coordinates: 72°00′N 24°30′W
- Sovereign state: (Danish Realm) Kingdom of Denmark
- Autonomous Territory: Greenland
- Administrative divisions: Northeast Greenland National Park and Sermersooq

Map of Northeastern Greenland, showing Scoresby Land at bottom.

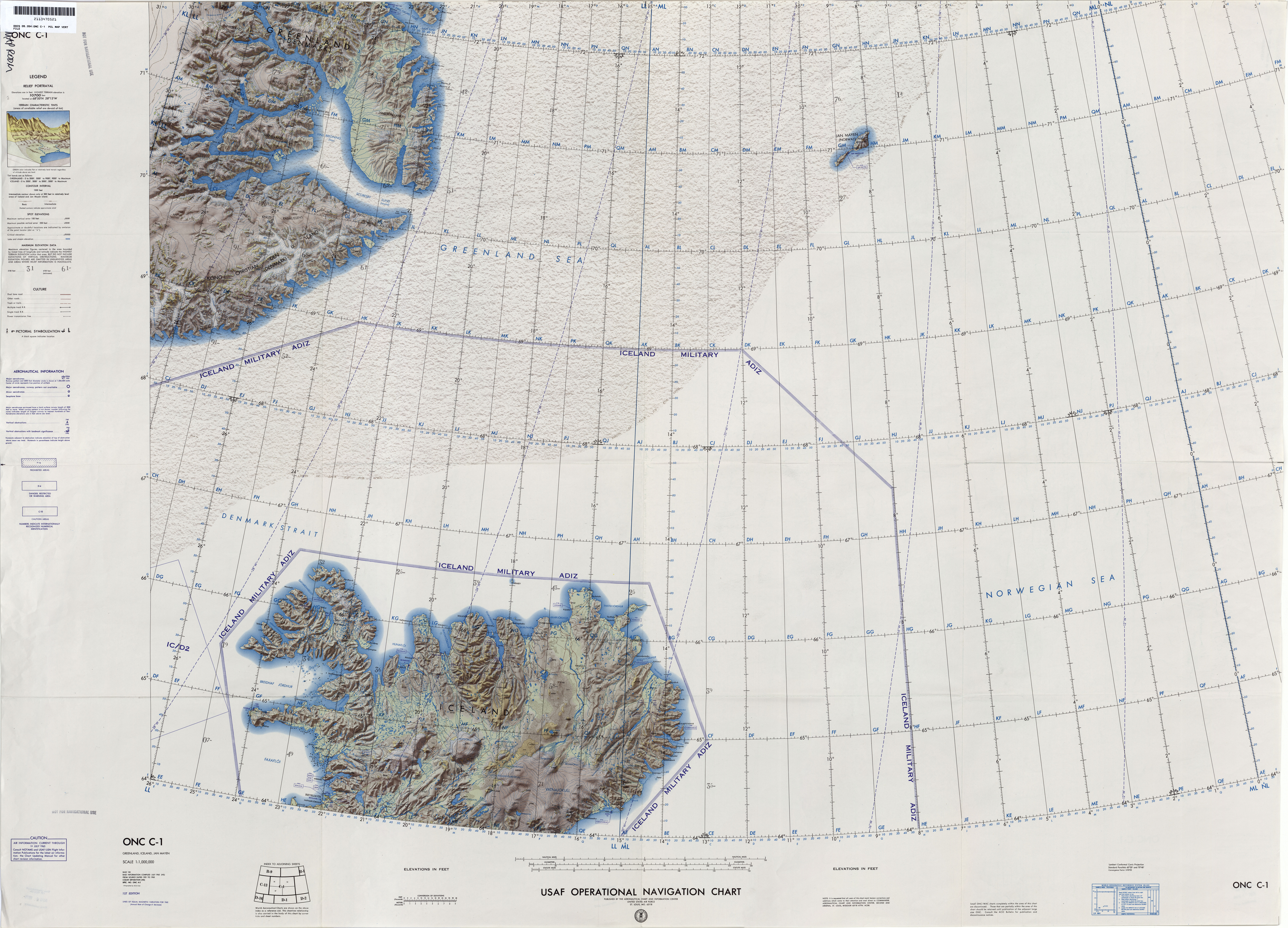
Map of Greenland Sea, showing Scoresby Land at top left.

Scoresby Land (Greenlandic: Scoresby Nuna) is an area of Eastern Greenland, which lies partly in Sermersooq and partly in the Northeast Greenland National Park zone. The area is uninhabited, except for Mestersvig, a military outpost.

Muskoxen are found in Scoresby Land, and formerly also reindeer.

== Geography ==
It is a mostly mountainous region, its northern part being made up of steep, difficult terrain, while the southern part towards Sydkap is smoother and more accessible. Scoresby Land is bound to the north by the King Oscar Fjord and its Segelsällskapet Fjord branch, to the south by the Scoresby Sound, Hall Bredning and the Nordvestfjord, and to the west by the Borgbjerg Glacier, the Princess Glacier, a part of Furesø and the Alpefjord, beyond which lies Nathorst Land.

The Holger Danske Briller lakes are located in the region.

Although formerly only the Stauning Alps and the northern part of Jameson Land were considered part of Scoresby Land, since 1961 the area has officially included the Stauning Alps in the northwest, Liverpool Land in the southeast, as well as Jameson Land.

Antarctic Haven is located on the southern shore of Davy Sound, in northern Scoresby Land.

== See also ==
- Scoresby Land Group
