= Cape Biot =

Headland in northeast Greenland

Cape Biot Kap Biot
- Headland
- Coordinates: 71°55′N 22°32′W
- Location: Sermersooq, Greenland
- Offshore water bodies: Davy Sound; Greenland Sea

Area
  - Total: Arctic

Cape Biot (Danish: Kap Biot) is a headland in the Greenland Sea, Northeast Greenland, Sermersooq municipality.

== History ==
This headland was named "Cape Biot" by William Scoresby (1789 – 1857) in 1822 to honour physicist, astronomer and mathematician Jean Baptiste Biot (1774 – 1862).

A hunting station known as "Kap Biot Station" was built by four Danes that had been brought on ship Furenak in 1940 at the NW end of Fleming Fjord below the promontory of Cape Biot at the time of WWII. As part of a covert operation, the purpose was to establish a weather station to support Third Reich military activity in the North Atlantic. On 7 September 1940 patrol boat Fridtjof Nansen of the Free Norwegian Navy evacuated the personnel to Iceland and destroyed the station by fire. The following year the Germans would try to establish another meteorological facility at Jonsbu.

== Geography ==
Cape Biot is located in the Greenland Sea, south of Cape Simpson on the opposite side of the mouth of Davy Sound.

Cape Biot is at the northwestern end of the Fleming Fjord in Jameson Land. It also marks the northern end of Sermersooq municipality. It is a conspicuous headland. Most of the year the area around the cape is filled with ice, even in the summer.

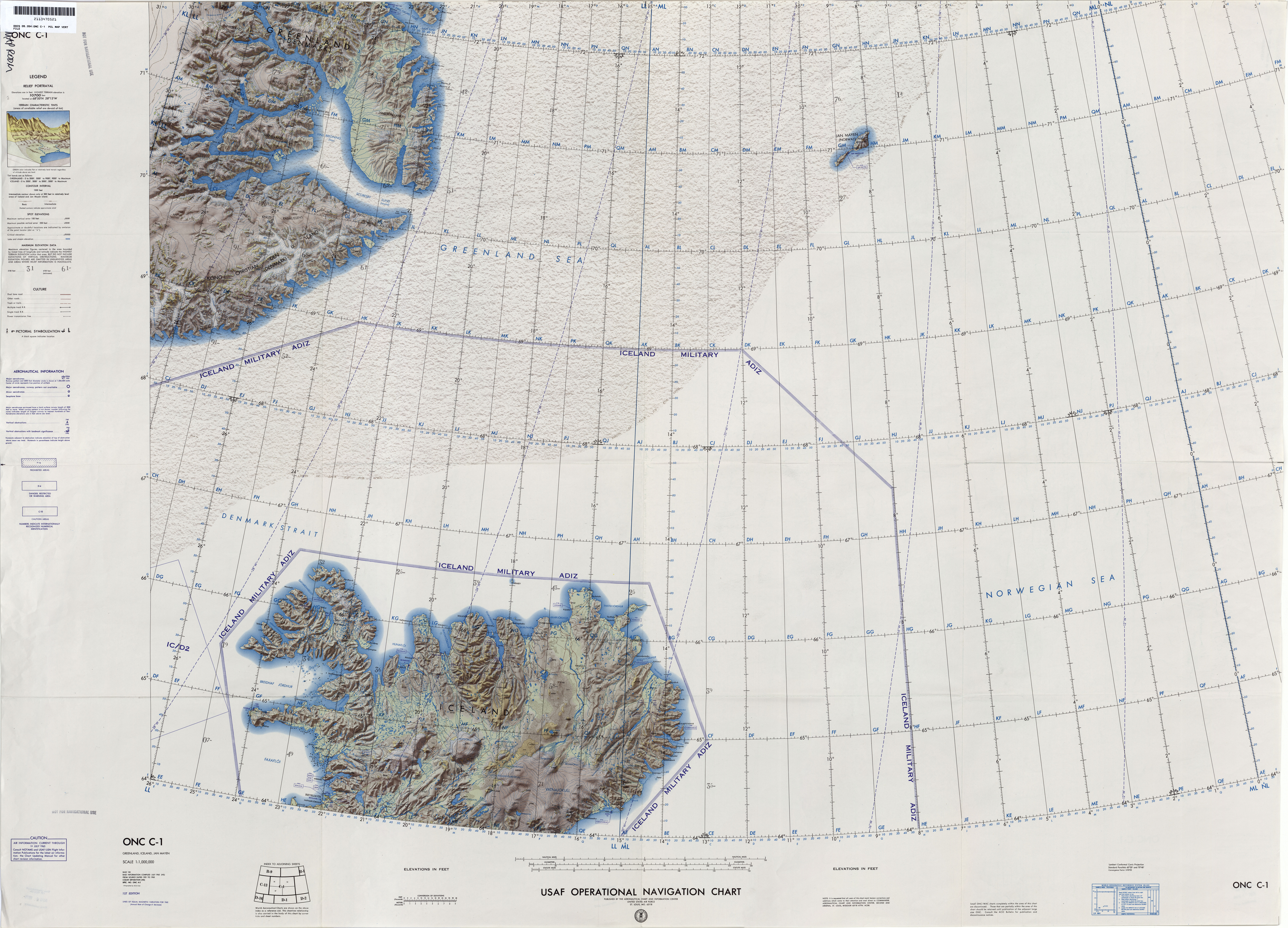
Map of NE Greenland and Iceland.

== See also ==
- Geography of Greenland
- Sirius Dog Sled Patrol
