= Traill Island =

Large island in eastern Greenland

Native name: Traill Ø
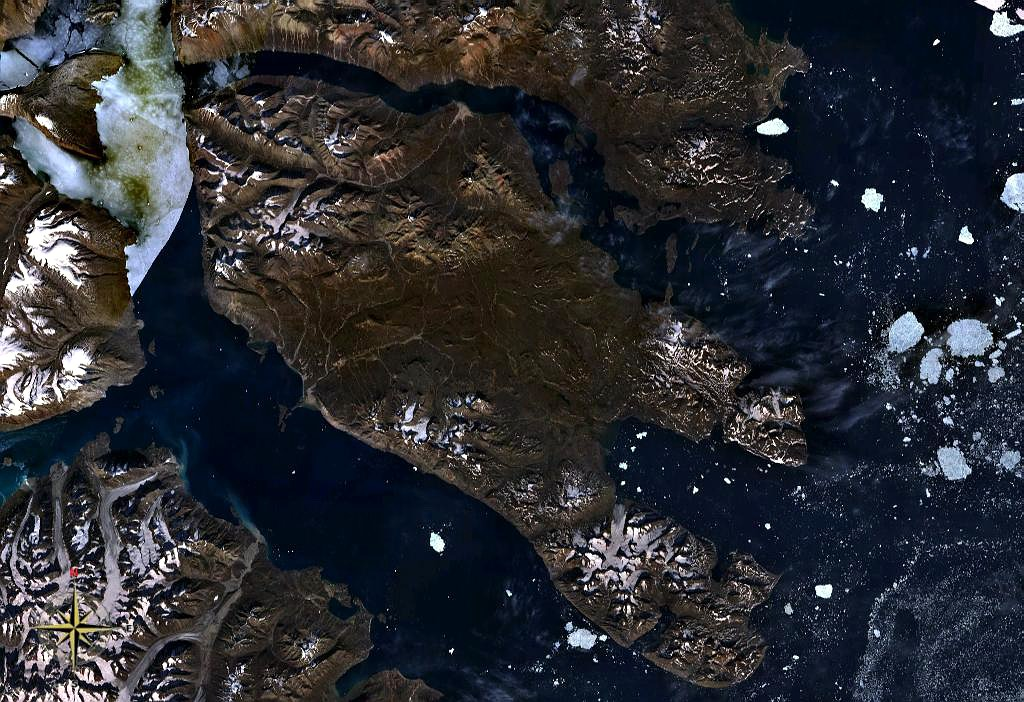
- Traill Island seen from space

- Location of Traill Island in Greenland
- Interactive map of Traill Island
- Etymology: Named after zoologist Thomas Stewart Traill

Geography
- Location: Greenland Sea
- Coordinates: 72°32′N 23°10′W
- Area: 3,452 km^{2} (1,333 sq mi)
- Area rank: 4th largest in Greenland; 153rd largest in world
- Highest elevation: 1,884 m (6181 ft)
- Highest point: Unnamed

Administration
- Greenland
- Unincorporated area: NE Greenland National Park

Demographics
- Population: 0 (2021)
- Pop. density: 0/km^{2} (0/sq mi)
- Ethnic groups: none

Traill Island (Danish: Traill Ø) is a large island in eastern Greenland. It is named after zoologist Thomas Stewart Traill. The island is a part of the Northeast Greenland National Park.

== Geography ==
Traill Island is a coastal island located in the desolate region of Eastern Greenland on the eastern side of King Oscar Fjord, northeast of Davy Sound. Geographical Society Island lies to the north, separated by a narrow channel, the Vega Sound.

The southernmost point of the island is Cape Simpson. Dream Bay (Drømmebugten) is located 14 km (8.7 mi) WNW of the headland and larger Mountnorris Fjord to the northeast.

The highest summit of the island, a 1,884 metres (6,181 feet) high unnamed peak of the Svinhufvud Range is one of the ultra-prominent summits of Greenland.

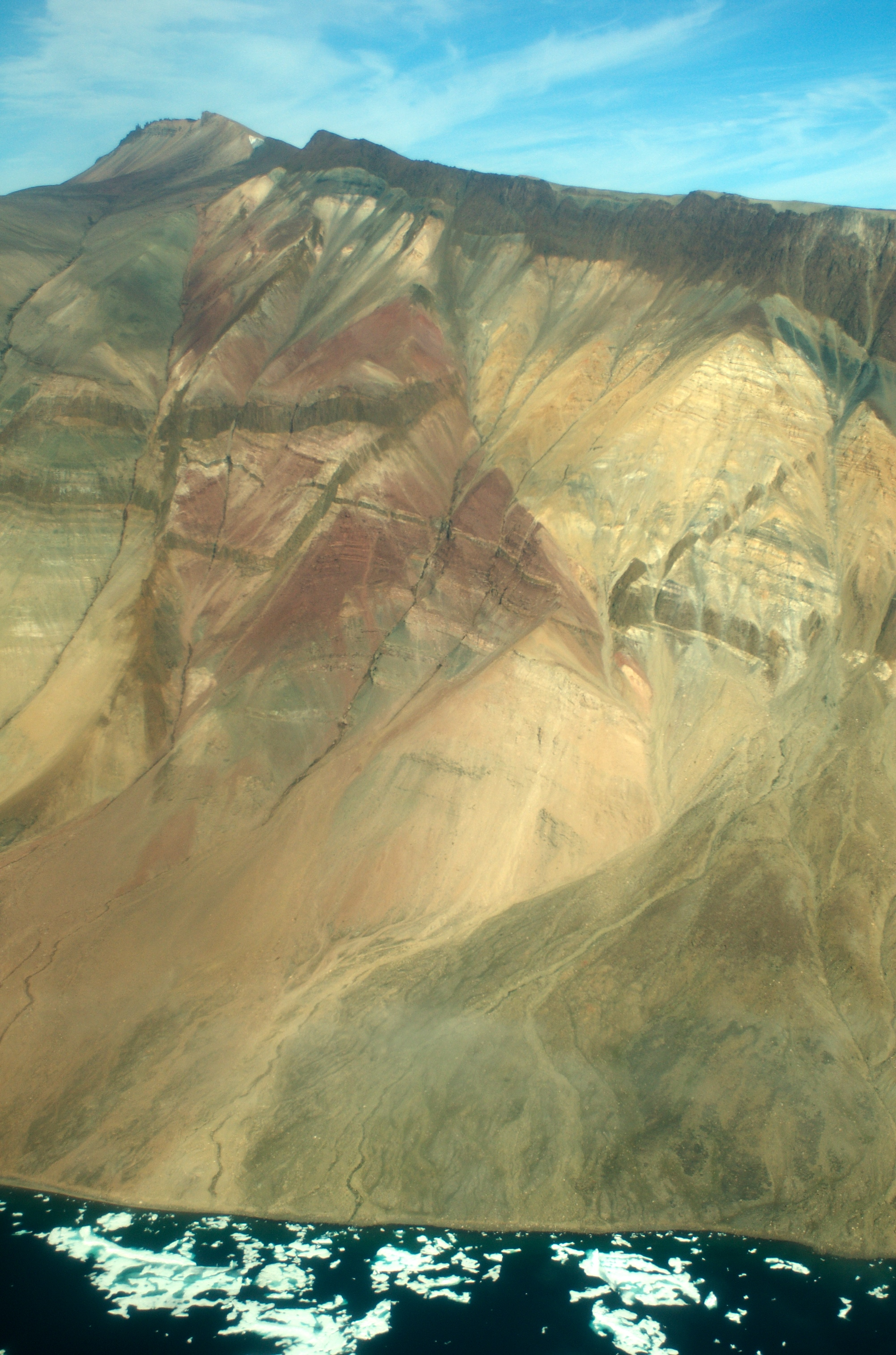
Giant-sized geological fault on the southern side of Traill Island

== See also ==
- List of islands of Greenland
- List of Ultras of Greenland
