= Davy Sound =

Body of water in northeast Greenland

- Davy Sund
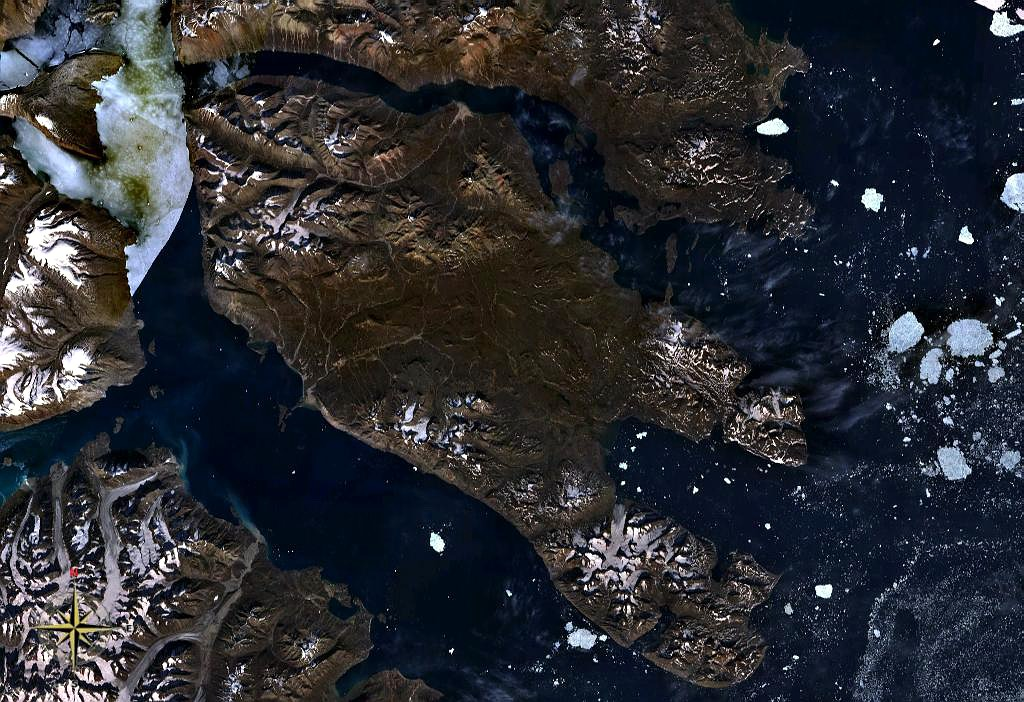
- View of a section of the Davy Sound south of Traill Island in a NASA picture.

- Location within Greenland
- Location: NE Greenland
- Coordinates: 72°0′N 22°0′W
- Part of: Arctic Ocean
- Ocean/sea sources: King Oscar Fjord (NW); Greenland Sea (SE)
- Basin countries: Greenland
- Max. length: 20 km (12 mi)
- Max. width: 12 km (7.5 mi)
- Frozen: Most of the year

The Davy Sound (Danish: Davy Sund) is a sound in King Christian X Land, Northeast Greenland. Administratively it is part of the Northeast Greenland National Park zone.

== History ==
The sound was named and put on the map by William Scoresby (1789 – 1857) in 1822 in honour of Cornish chemist and inventor Sir Humphry Davy (1778 – 1829), president of the Royal Society from 1820 to 1827.

In 1899, during the Swedish Greenland Expedition on which Swedish Arctic explorer Alfred Gabriel Nathorst found and first mapped King Oscar Fjord, he made southwards for the Davy Sound after having entered from Antarctic Sound. But Davy sound was blocked by ice and Nathorst had to travel back north.

Nathorst proposed 72° 10′ N as the northern limit of Davy Sound, which is roughly the present day geographic limit. Lieut. P. F. White of the Cambridge Expedition to East Greenland suggested that the limit of the Davy Sound should be expanded until 72° 30′, at the bend in the fjord trending northward —near the mouth of Segelsällskapet Fjord. This proposal, by which the length of the Davy Sound would be greater than that corresponding to King Oscar Fjord, has not found wide acceptance.

== Geography ==
Davy Sound is a broad channel with a fjord structure that runs roughly from the Greenland Sea in the southeast to the northwest for roughly 20 km (12 mi), becoming King Oscar Fjord further to the north. Its minimum width is 12 km (7.5 mi). The Davy Sound separates the northeastern shore of Jameson Land —part of the Greenland mainland— from the southwestern shore of Traill Island. Cape Simpson rises on the northeastern side of the mouth of the sound and Cape Biot on the southwestern.

Antarctic Haven is located on the southwestern shore, about 20 km (12 mi) from Cape Biot and Mesters Vig a little further up the same shore.

Even in the summertime the channel is usually encumbered by ice and tidal currents are strong and dangerous for navigation.

Map of Northeastern Greenland

== See also ==
- List of fjords of Greenland
