= Three-year expedition to East Greenland =

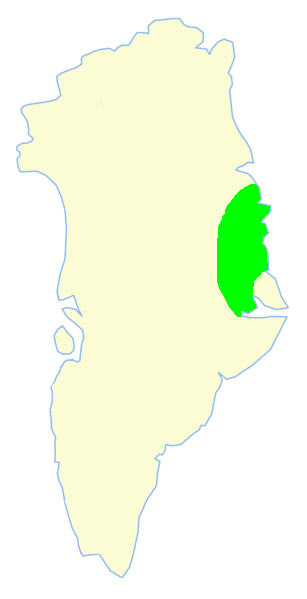
Explored area, King Christian X Land.

Norwegian-occupied Eirik Raudes Land

The Three-year Expedition (Danish: Treårsekspeditionen) was an exploratory expedition to East Greenland that lasted from 1931 to 1934 financed by the Carlsberg Foundation and the Danish state. The expedition included aerial surveys.

Many geographic features in East Greenland were mapped and named during the expedition. Eskimonaes station was used as a wintering base by the Three-year Expedition to East Greenland.

== History ==
The expedition was led by Lauge Koch. The other participants were Danish and Swedish geographers, geologists, archaeologists, zoologists and botanists: Paul Gelting, Gunnar Seidenfaden, Thorvald Sørensen, Steen Hasselbach, Helge G. Backlund, Gunnar Thorson, Gunnar Säve-Söderbergh, Helge Larsen, Thyge Johansen, L. Bruhn, H. Heinrich Nielsen and N. V. Petersen. The expedition vessels were Godthaab and Gustav Holm. The engagement of the Danish state had political connotations, because of the ongoing dispute between Denmark and Norway over East Greenland.

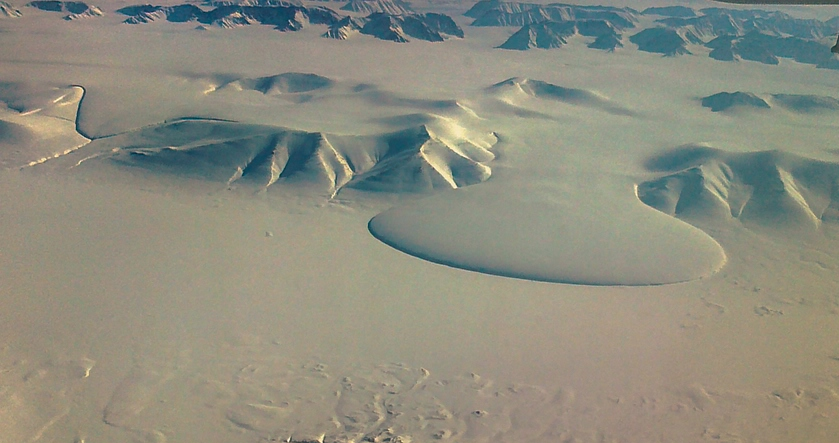
The Elephant Foot Glacier, first mapped by the Three-year Expedition

== See also ==
- Arctic exploration
- List of Arctic expeditions
- Cartographic expeditions to Greenland
- King Frederick VIII Land
- Cape Brown (Greenland)

== Bibliography ==
- Thorson, G., ed. (1937) Med treaarsekspeditionen til Christian X's land. Af deltagere i ekspeditionen. København, Gyldendalske Boghandel Nordisk Forlag.
- Seidenfaden, G. (1938) Moderne Arktisk Forskning, Copenhagen. English edition 1939, Modern Arctic Exploration, with a preface by Peter Freuchen, translated by Naomi Walford.
