= Alfred Gabriel Nathorst =

Swedish Arctic explorer (1850–1921)

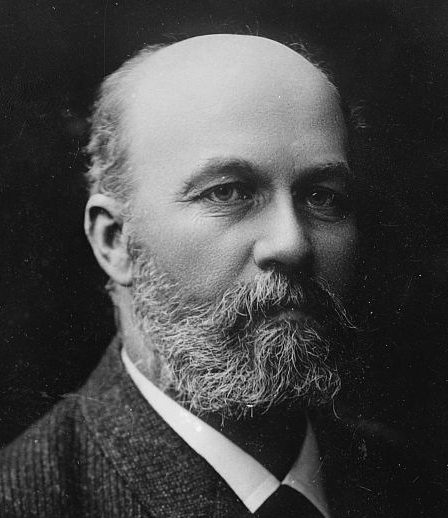
Alfred Gabriel Nathorst

Alfred Gabriel Nathorst (7 November 1850 – 20 January 1921) was a Swedish Arctic explorer, geologist, and palaeobotanist. He travelled to Spitsbergen, Svalbard and Greenland where he took an interest in the Arctic floras from the Paleozoic and Mesozoic periods.

== Life ==
Nathorst was born in Väderbrunn in Sweden to Hjalmar Otto and Maria Charlotta born Georgii, who had moved to Alnarp where Hjalmar served as a professor at the institute of agriculture. Nathorst studied at Malmö before joining the University of Lund in 1868. He spent some time in the University of Uppsala and returned to Lund for his doctorate in 1874. His interest in botany were influenced by N. P. Angelin. Nathorst's interest in geology was awakened by Charles Lyell's Principles of Geology and, at the age of 21, Nathorst visited Lyell in England in 1872.

Nathorst was employed at the Geological Survey of Sweden in 1873–84. He was then appointed professor, by royal decree on the 5 December 1884, and was simultaneously made curator of the new "Department of Archegoniates and Fossil Plants" at the Swedish Museum of Natural History. He remained at this post until his retirement in 1917.

Nathorst visited Spitsbergen in 1870 and in 1882–83 he participated in the Second Dickson expedition ("Den andra Dicksonska Expeditionen till Grönland") led by Adolf Erik Nordenskiöld. He led an expedition on the ship Antarctic to Bear Island and Svalbard including the isolated Kong Karls Land in 1898. The following year (1899), Nathorst led an expedition to Greenland. This second expedition had the dual purpose of geographical mapping and of searching for survivors of S. A. Andrée's Arctic balloon expedition of 1897. The Andreé expedition was not found, however Nathorst found and mapped the Antarctic Sound, a fjord branch connecting Kaiser Franz Joseph Fjord to the north with the head of King Oscar Fjord to the south. The two expeditions are described in two volumes Två somrar i Norra Ishavet (in Swedish).

Starting with macrofossil deposited in glacial clay found in Scania in 1871, Nathorst investigated postglacial development in plants. He also researched plant remains from older geological eras, such as the palaeozoic and mesozoic from the Arctic and tertiary from Japan. These investigations made him an internationally acknowledged authority on palaeobotany.

Nathorst had a scientific dispute with Eugen Warming over the history of the flora of Greenland. Warming hypothesised that part of the flora had survived the last glaciation – the nunatak hypothesis, while Nathorst considered that the entire flora had immigrated anew after the glaciation – the tabula rasa hypothesis.

He was an elected member of many learned societies, including the Royal Swedish Academy of Sciences (1885). He died on 20 January 1921.

== Legacy ==
A number of plant, animal and fungal species have been named to his honour, e.g. Saxifraga nathorstii (Dusén) Hayek (East Greenland saxifrage) and a suite of fossil plant species, Williamsonia nathorstii Carruthers (a fossil dragonfly) and Laestadites nathorstii Mesch. (a fossil fungus).

Nathorst Land in East Central Greenland is named after him. On Spitsbergen, Svalbard, Nathorst Land and Nathorstbreen are named after him. Also Alfredfjellet, a mountain at the island of Bjørnøya, is named after him.

== See also ==
- Cartographic expeditions to Greenland
