= Wordie =

Wordie may refer to:

- James Wordie (1889–1962), Scottish explorer and geologist
- Wordie Glacier, a glacier in northeastern Greenland
- Mount Wordie, a mountain in Alaska
- Wordie House, the main hut of the former British Faraday Station in Antarctica, now the Vernadsky Research Base
- Wordie Nunatak, a rock outcrop in Enderby Land, Antarctica
- Wordie Bay, a bay in Antarctica near the Wordie Ice Shelf
- Wordie Bay (Greenland), a bay in Greenland
- Wordie Seamount, a seamount in the South Shetland Islands, Antarctica
- Point Wordie, a headland on Elephant Island in the South Shetland Islands, Antarctica
- Wordie Point, the southwestern point of Visokoi Island
- Wordie Ice Shelf, a former glacier in Antarctica
