= Muskox Fjord =

Fjord in Greenland

- Moskusoksefjord
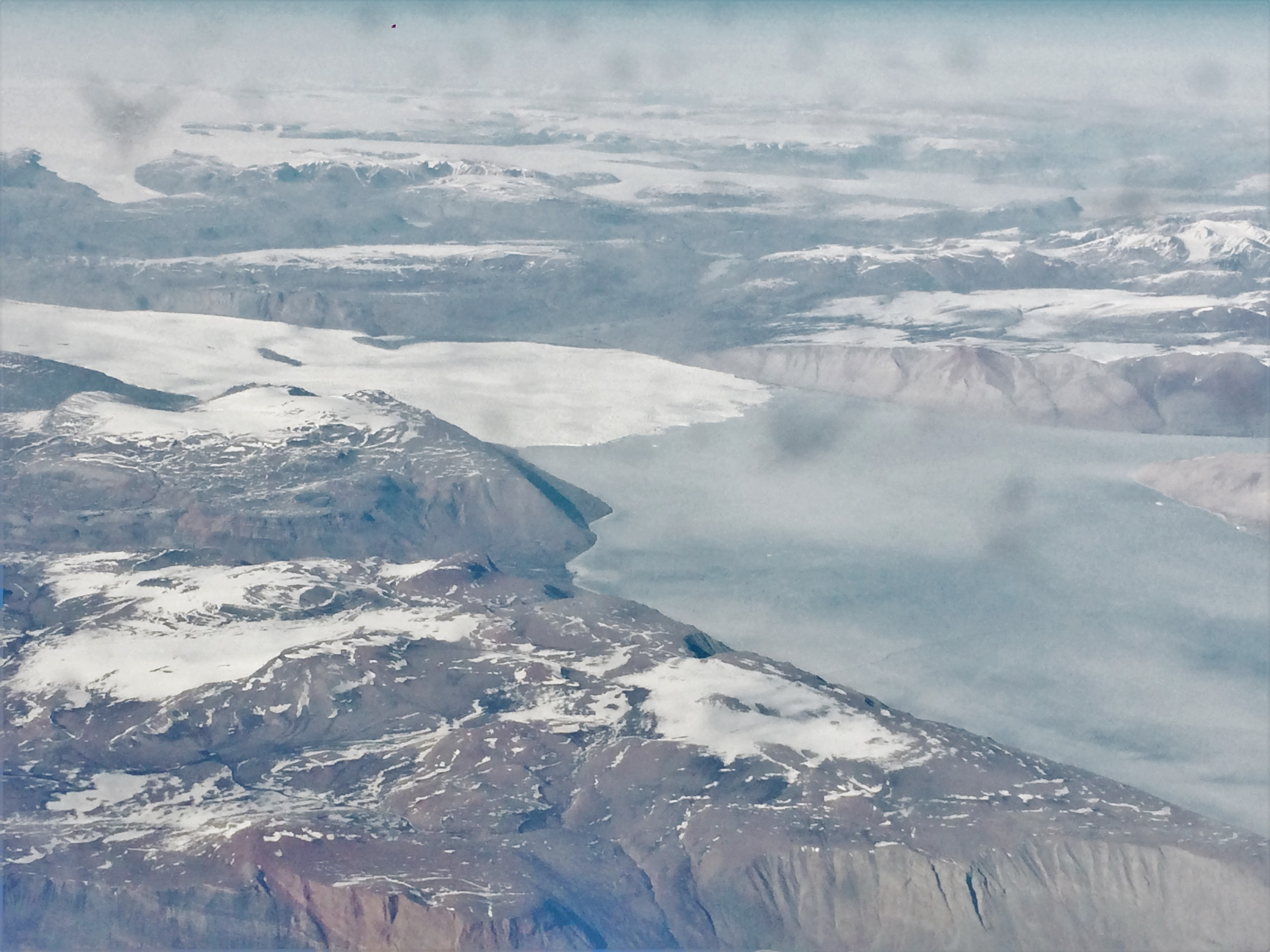
- Nordfjord head and Waltershausen Glacier terminus. The entrance of Muskox Fjord can be seen on the right side of the picture.

- Location in Greenland
- Location: Arctic
- Coordinates: 73°38′N 23°10′W
- Ocean/sea sources: Nordfjord; Kaiser Franz Joseph Fjord; Greenland Sea
- Basin countries: Greenland
- Max. length: 60 kilometres (37 mi)
- Max. width: 3 kilometres (1.9 mi)
- Frozen: Most of the year

Muskox Fjord (Danish: Moskusoksefjord) is a fjord in King Christian X Land, East Greenland. Administratively it lies in the Northeast Greenland National Park area. This fjord is part of the Kaiser Franz Joseph Fjord system.

== History ==
Muskox Fjord was mapped in 1899 during the Swedish Greenland Expedition in search of survivors of S. A. Andrée's Arctic balloon expedition of 1897 led by Swedish Arctic explorer Alfred Gabriel Nathorst (1850–1921). It was named Moskusoksefjorden after the muskox of which Nathorst saw a quite large herd near the shores of the fjord, one of the areas in East Greenland providing a habitat for this resilient Arctic mammal.

There are Norwegian hunting huts by the shores of the fjord.

== Geography ==
Muskox Fjord is a branch of the Nordfjord, a tributary of Kaiser Franz Joseph Fjord. Its entrance is located in the eastern shore of the head of Nordfjord, southeast of the terminus of the Waltershausen Glacier, between Cape Kolthoff in the south and Cape Bull in the north.

The fjord is about 3 kilometres (1.9 mi) wide near the mouth, narrowing to an average of less than 2 kilometres (1.2 mi) in most of the length of its inner part. It stretches roughly towards the southeast for almost 50 kilometres (31 mi), curving northeastwards for the last 10 kilometres (6.2 mi) until the head.

Muskox Fjord separates Hudson Land in the north from the Gauss Peninsula in the south. There are up to 1,220 metres (4,000 ft) high mountains on both sides of the mouth area of the fjord, where there are some places with good anchorages. There is no glacier flowing into the head, which is located in the isthmus area of Hold with Hope, only 7 kilometres (4.3 mi) west of the head of Loch Fyne.

Map of Northeastern Greenland

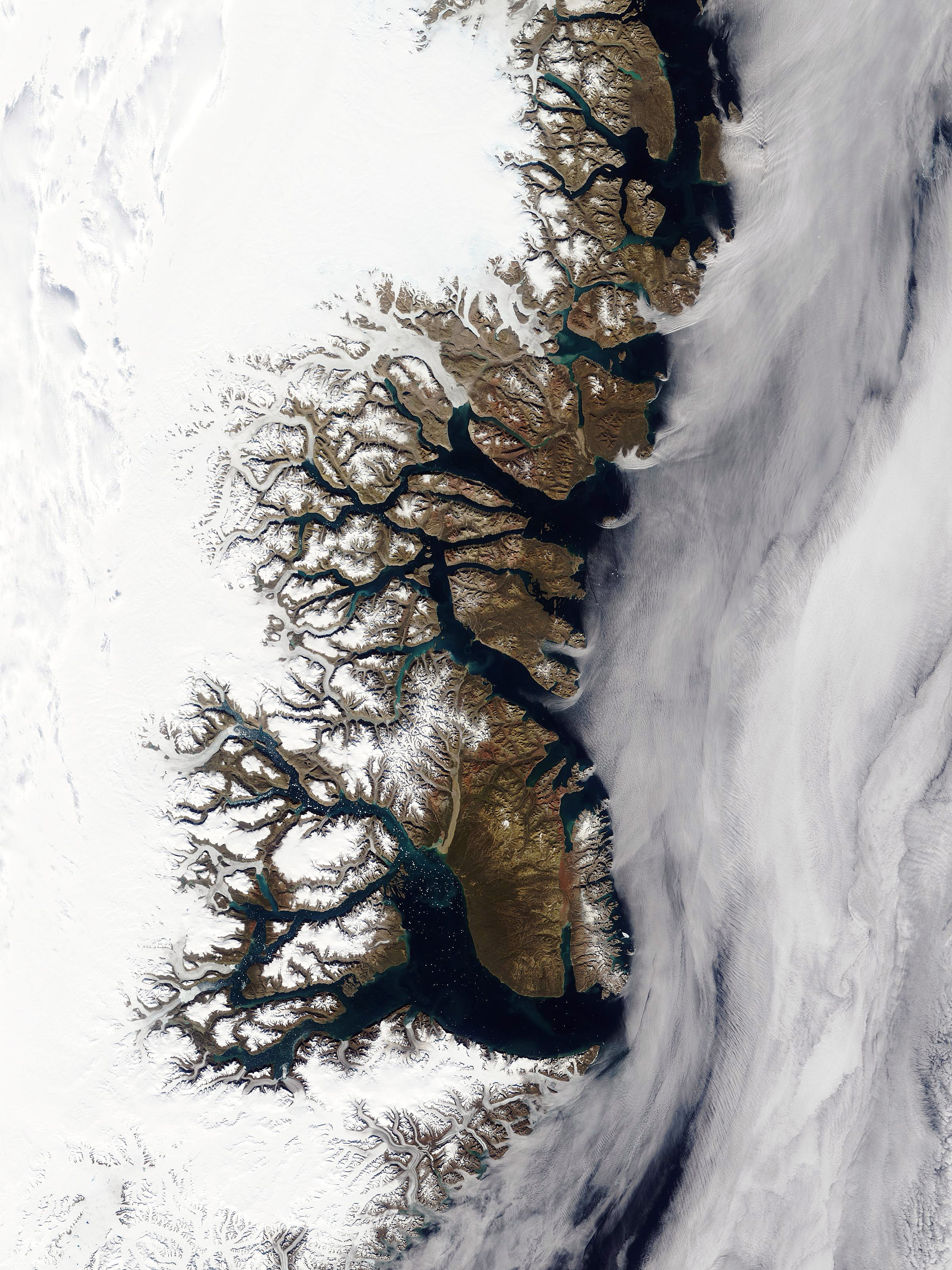
East Greenland Terra/MODIS satellite image

== Bibliography ==
- A. K. Higgins, Jane A. Gilotti, M. Paul Smith (eds.), The Greenland Caledonides: Evolution of the Northeast Margin of Laurentia.

== See also ==
- List of fjords of Greenland
