= Godthåb Gulf =

Greenlandic water body

- Godthåb Golf
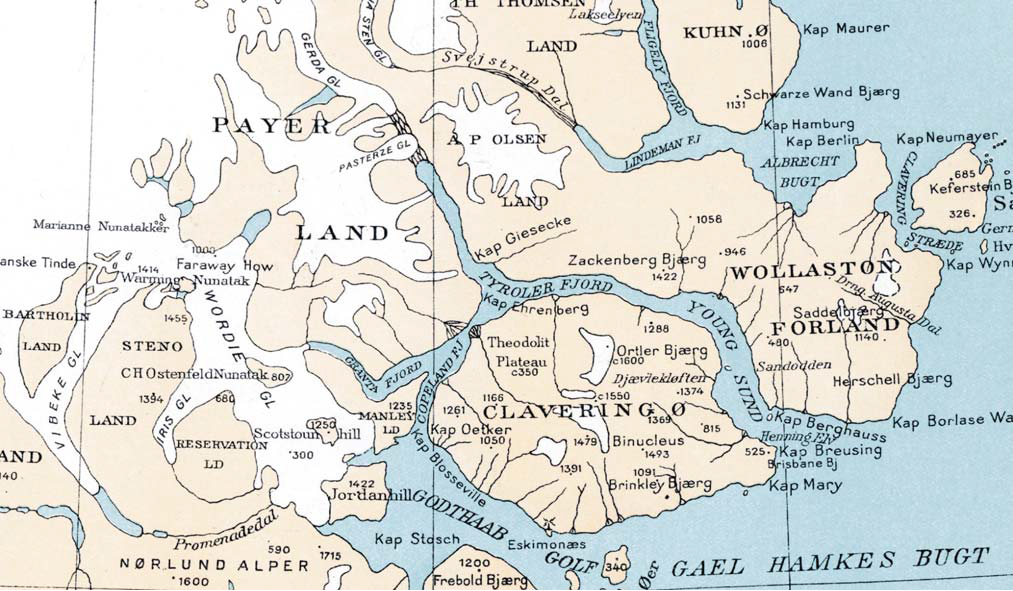
- Map section with the gulf near the bottom.

- Location in Greenland
- Location: Arctic
- Coordinates: 74°6′N 22°0′W
- Ocean/sea sources: Gael Hamke Bay; Greenland Sea
- Basin countries: Greenland
- Max. length: 30 kilometres (19 mi)
- Max. width: 20 kilometres (12 mi)

Godthåb Gulf (Danish: Godthåb Golf, spelled Godthaab pre-1948), also known as Clavering Fjord, Clavering Sound and Inner Bay, is a fjord in King Christian X Land, East Greenland. Administratively it is part of the Northeast Greenland National Park zone.

== History ==
The bay was named "Godthaab Golf" during the 1929–1930 Expedition to East Greenland by Lauge Koch after expedition ship Godthaab, a 287-ton barquentine built at Sandefjord (Norway) in 1898 and purchased by the Greenland Administration (Grønlands Styrelse).

== Geography ==
Godthab Gulf lies southwest of Clavering Island and north of Cape Stosch and the northern coastline of Hold with Hope. It is only 8 kilometres (5.0 mi) wide at the entrance, but it widens to almost 20 kilometres (12 mi) towards its head.

To the east lie the Finsch Islands, where the fjord widens and becomes Gael Hamke Bay. Loch Fyne fjord has its mouth in the southern and the Copeland Fjord in the northern shore, with Payer Land to the northwest. The Wordie Glacier has its terminus in Wordie Bay, a small bay at the head of the fjord. A. Schmidt Glacier, Nippoldt Glacier and Haussman Glacier are small glaciers flowing north into Wordie Bay from the Norlund Alps. Hudson Land lies to the southwest and further to the west is Steno Land.

Map of Northeastern Greenland

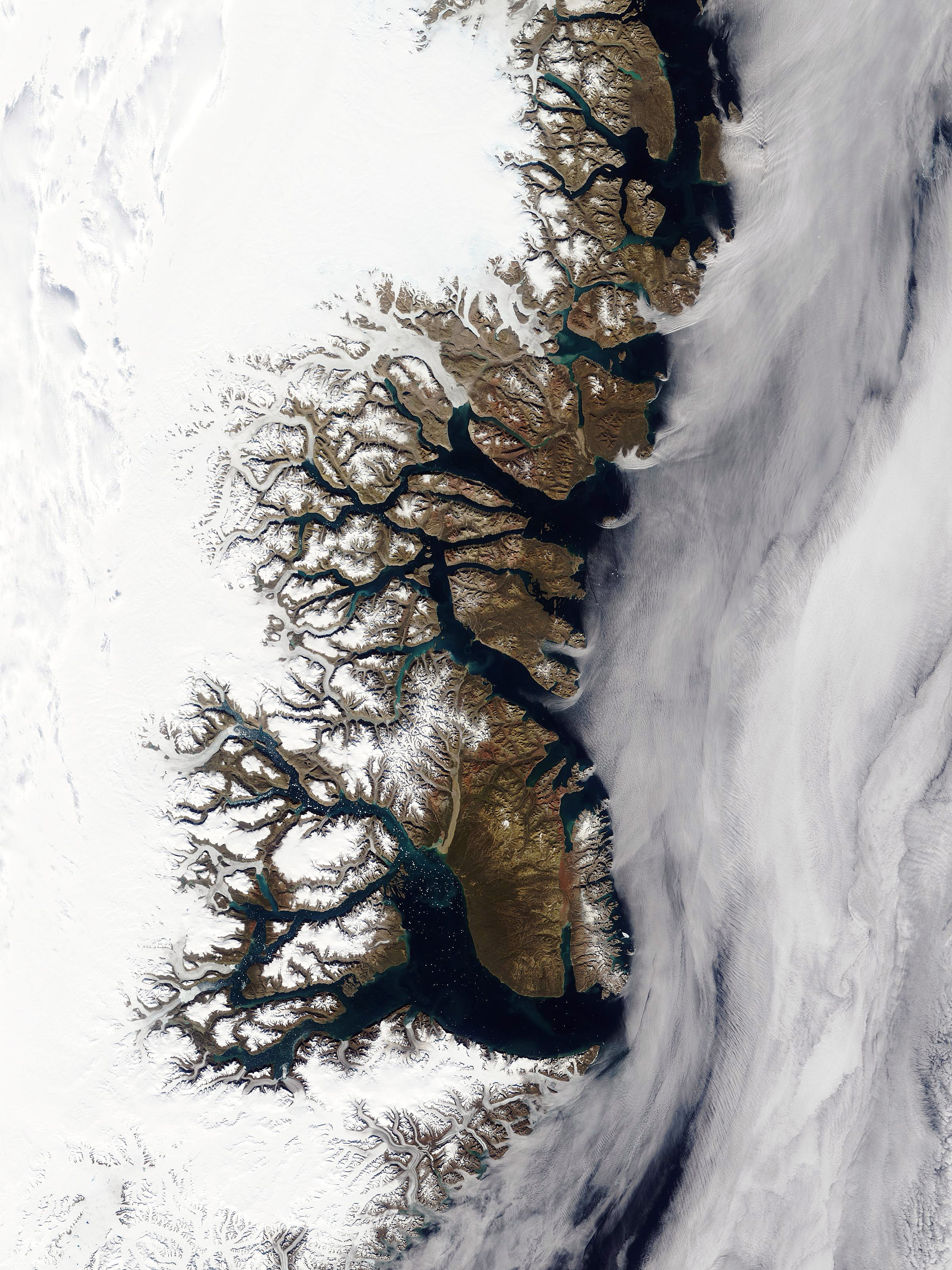
East Greenland Terra/MODIS satellite image

== See also ==
- List of fjords of Greenland
- List of Islands in the Arctic Ocean
