= Faraway How =

Nunatak in Greenland

- Location within Greenland

Highest point
- Elevation: 1,398 m (4,587 ft)
- Coordinates: 74°25′N 23°33′W

Geography
- Location: King Christian X Land, Greenland

Climbing
- First ascent: Unknown

Faraway How is a nunatak in King Christian X Land, East Greenland. Administratively it falls under the Northeast Greenland National Park zone.

This geographic feature was named by the 1926 Cambridge Expedition to East Greenland led by Sir James Wordie.

== Geography ==
Faraway How is located in the Wordie Glacier north of Steno Land and 9 km to the west of C. H. Ostenfeld Nunatak's northern end.

Faraway How is 7.8 km in length and its maximum width is 3.2 km; the highest elevation is located at the western end and is 1,398 metres (4,587 ft) high.

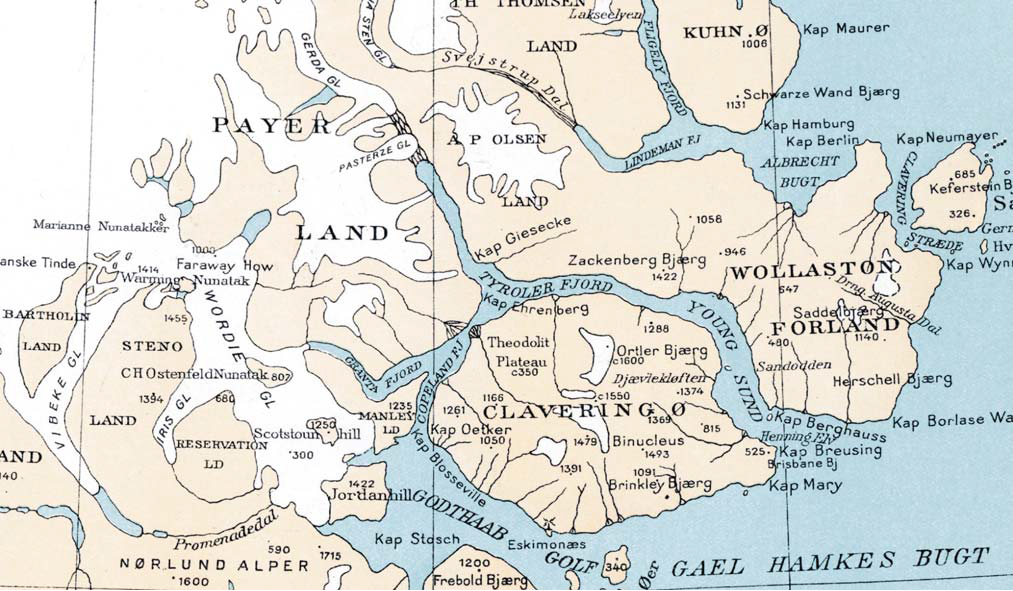
1932 map section showing Faraway How and the Wordie Glacier on the left.

Detailed map of the area.

== See also ==
- List of mountains in Greenland
- List of nunataks of Greenland

== Bibliography ==
- Wordie, J. M.; Manley, G.; White, P. F.; Johnson, D. McI. (1927). "The Cambridge Expedition to East Greenland in 1926". The Geographical Journal. 70 (3): 225–265. doi:10.2307/1781943. JSTOR 1781943.
