= Nordfjord (Greenland) =

Fjord in East Greenland

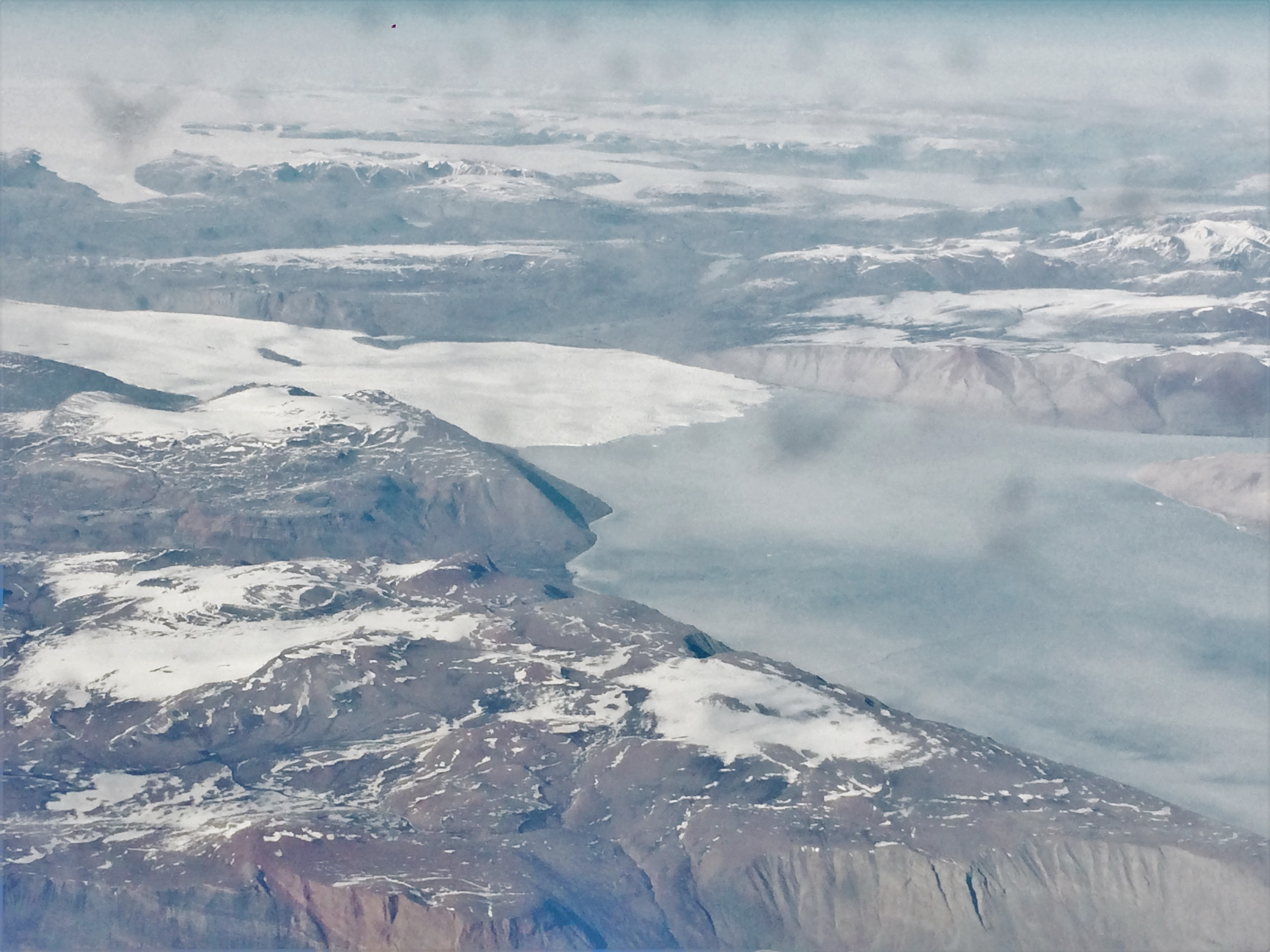
- View of the Nordfjord with the calving end of the Waltershausen Glacier

- Location within Greenland
- Location: NE Greenland
- Coordinates: 73°40′N 24°15′W
- Ocean/sea sources: Kaiser Franz Joseph Fjord; Greenland Sea
- Basin countries: Greenland
- Max. length: 60 kilometres (37 mi)
- Max. width: 13.3 kilometres (8.3 mi)
- Average depth: 49 metres (161 ft)

Nordfjord is a fjord in the NE Greenland National Park area, East Greenland.

The fjord was named in 1899 by Swedish Arctic explorer A.G. Nathorst during the expedition he led to Greenland. In 1931 a scientific station known as Nordfjordhuset was built on the western shore of the fjord at the time of the 1931–34 Treårsekspeditionen.

== Geography ==
The Nordfjord is a wide fjord part of the Kaiser Franz Joseph Fjord system. It is located between Strindberg Land and the Gauss Peninsula and has the large Waltershausen Glacier at its head. To the south the fjord opens into the northern shore of the Kaiser Franz Joseph Fjord —about 64 km from the Foster Bay of the Greenland Sea— where it reaches a width of 13.3 km with depths between 18 and 49 m.

The Brogetdalen, known as "multicolored valley" owing to the different colours of the mountains surrounding it, is a large valley in Strindberg Land that drains east to the Nordfjord. A river enters the fjord 16 km north of the entrance through the Muskox Fjord (Moskusokse Fjord), a long tributary fjord or arm that enters Nordfjord from its eastern shore close to the head. Cape Ovibos is the headland at the western side of the entrance.

Map of Northeastern Greenland

== See also ==
- List of fjords of Greenland

== Bibliography ==
- Ingrid Leirvik Olsen, Sedimentary processes and paleoenvironments in Moskusoksefjord and Nordfjord, North-East Greenland, The Arctic University of Norway, Tromsø, 15 May 2015
