= Wordie Bay (Greenland) =

Bay in Greenland

- Wordie Bugt
- Location in Greenland
- Location: Arctic
- Coordinates: 74°3.7′N 22°20.09′W
- Ocean/sea sources: Godthab Gulf; Gael Hamke Bay; Greenland Sea
- Basin countries: Greenland
- Max. length: 7 kilometres (4.3 mi)
- Max. width: 5 kilometres (3.1 mi)

Wordie Bay (Danish: Wordie Bugt) is a bay in eastern Greenland. Administratively it is part of the Northeast Greenland National Park zone.

== History ==
The bay appeared as "Wordiebukta" on the 1932 Norwegian Svalbard and Arctic Ocean Survey Norges Svalbard og Ishavsundersøkelser (NSIU) map. Like the glacier at its head, it was named after Scottish polar explorer James Wordie (1889–1962).

== Geography ==
Wordie Bay is a section of fjord at the head of the Godthab Gulf. It is located at the terminus of the Wordie Glacier, between Stromtangen and Cape Ruth. There are several nunataks rising above the shore. Cape Ruth is at the southeastern end of Jordanhill, a conspicuous 1,410 metres (4,630 ft) high promontory rising by the shore of the bay on the northern side. The bay has a width of about 3 kilometres (1.9 mi) at the head, widening to almost 5 kilometres (3.1 mi) south of Cape Ruth.

Besides the great Wordie Glacier in the west, A. Schmidt Glacier, Nippoldt Glacier and Haussman Glacier are small glaciers flowing north into Wordie Bay from the Norlund Alps. Hudson Land lies to the south and further to the west is Steno Land.

Map of Northeastern Greenland

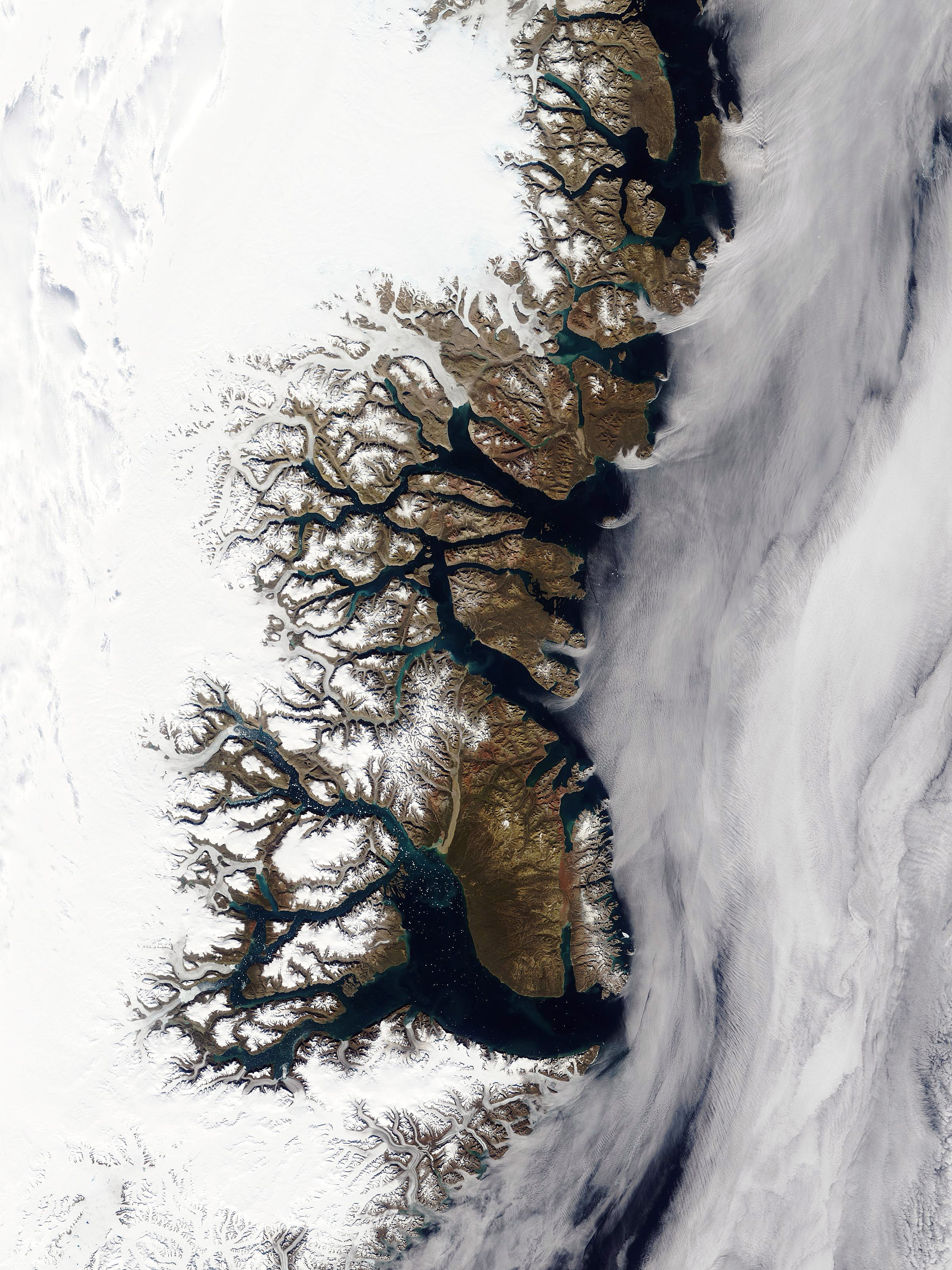
East Greenland Terra/MODIS satellite image
