= Edmund Dymond =

Scottish physicist and meteorologist

Edmund Gilbert Dymond FRSE RMS (1901-26 January 1953) was a Scottish physicist and meteorologist who served with James Mann Wordie on his Arctic explorations of 1937. He is also remembered for his refinement of the Radiosonde during the Second World War.

== Life ==
He was born in Hairwain in south Wales. As a child he was studious by nature, but suffered from ill-health which interrupted his studies. He studied natural sciences at the University of Cambridge. He made a special study of electron collisions in gases, and was made a Fellow of St John's College in 1925.

From 1932 to 1952 he lectured in natural philosophy at the University of Edinburgh. In 1933 he was elected a Fellow of the Royal Society of Edinburgh. His proposers were Charles Galton Darwin, Charles Glover Barkla, Robert Schlapp, and Ernest Bowman Ludlam. In 1937 he was chosen by James Mann Wordie to act as official meteorologist on a trip of the Endurance to Baffin Bay and the Canadian Arctic. Working with H. Carmichael he developed methods for measuring cosmic ray intensity at a height of 12 miles (19 km) above the surface of the planet. During the Second World War he was posted to Kew Observatory to make studies of the outer atmosphere, and perfected the British Radiosonde.

He returned to Edinburgh in 1946 and died there on 26 January 1953.
