= Loch Fyne (Greenland) =

Fjord in Greenland

- Location within Greenland
- Location: NE Greenland
- Coordinates: 73°48′N 24°48.5′W
- Ocean/sea sources: Godthab Gulf; Gael Hamke Bay; Greenland Sea
- Basin countries: Greenland
- Max. length: 45 kilometres (28 mi)
- Max. width: 2.5 kilometres (1.6 mi)

Loch Fyne is a fjord in the NE Greenland National Park area, East Greenland.

== History ==
The fjord was explored and mapped in 1823 by British Arctic explorer Douglas Clavering during the Commissioners for the Discovery of the Longitude at Sea expedition. It was named after "Lock Fine" in Scotland. In the intervening years the spelling was corrected to "Loch Fyne" in maps of Scotland and in the maps of Greenland Danish cartographers adopted the modern corrected spelling as well.

There are a number of Norwegian and Danish cabins by the shores of this fjord. Both hunting areas and fishing grounds are good in the area of Loch Fyne.

== Geography ==
Loch Fyne is located east of the Norlund Alps, between Hudson Land to the west and Hold with Hope in the east. Its mouth is in the Godthab Gulf to the north, between Cape Stosch, and Stromtangen. The fjord is long and narrow, running roughly from north to south for about 45 kilometres (28 mi). Its head, located in the isthmus area of Hold with Hope, is only 7 kilometres (4.3 mi) east of the head of the Muskox Fjord (Moskusokse Fjord) —part of the Kaiser Franz Joseph Fjord system.

The fjord has a 400 metres (1,300 ft) wide bottleneck about 10 kilometres (6.2 mi) south of its mouth.

Map of Northeastern Greenland

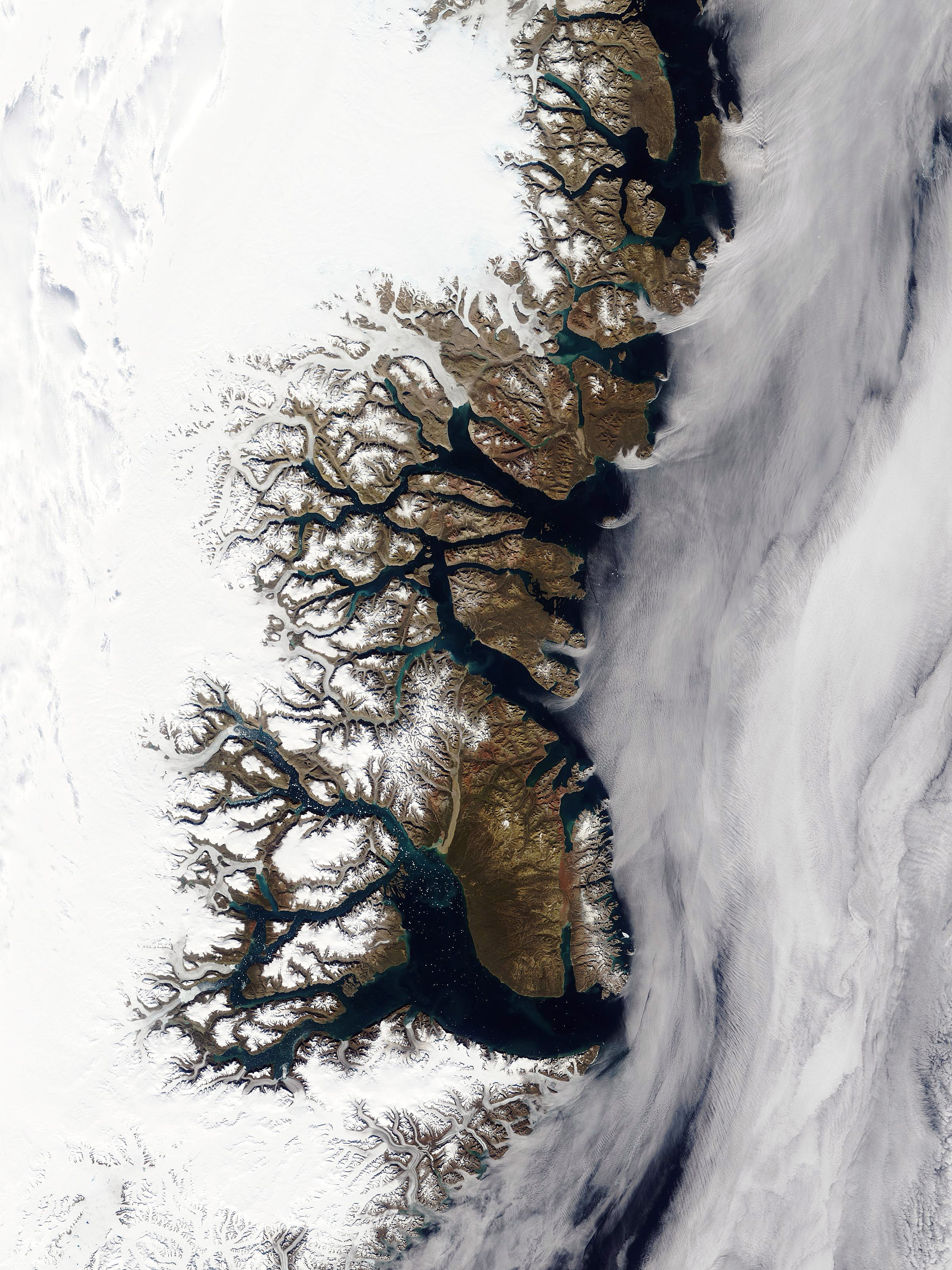
East Greenland Terra/MODIS satellite image

== See also ==
- List of fjords of Greenland
