= C. H. Ostenfeld Nunatak =

Nunatak in King Christian X Land, Greenland

- Location within Greenland

Highest point
- Elevation: 1,019 m (3,343 ft)
- Coordinates: 74°17′N 22°56′W

Geography
- Location: King Christian X Land, Greenland

Climbing
- First ascent: Unknown

C. H. Ostenfeld Nunatak is a nunatak in King Christian X Land, East Greenland. Administratively it falls under the Northeast Greenland National Park zone.

This geographic feature was named by Lauge Koch during his 1929–30 expeditions after Danish botanist Carl Hansen Ostenfeld (1873–1931), author of Flora of Greenland and its origin.

== Geography ==
It is a relatively large nunatak located east of Stenoland between the Wordie Glacier and the Granta Glacier. Its northern end lies 9 km to the east of Faraway How's eastern point.

C. H. Ostenfeld Nunatak is 15.7 km in length and its maximum width is 6.4 km; the highest elevation is located at the western end and is 1,019 metres (3,343 ft) high.

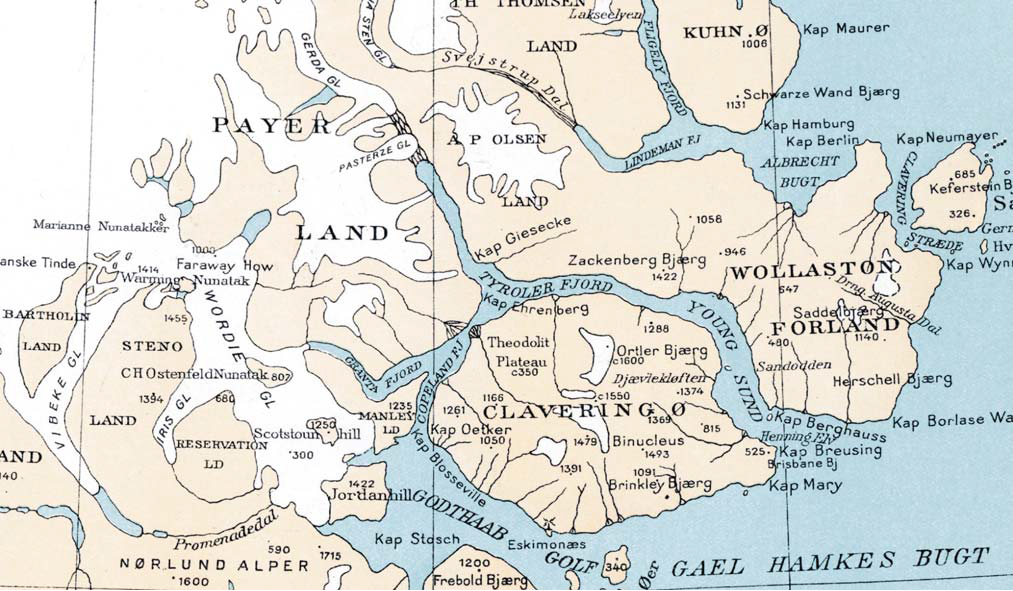
1932 map section showing C. H. Ostenfeld Nunatak and the Wordie Glacier on the left.

Detailed map of the area.

== See also ==
- List of nunataks of Greenland
