= Gauss Peninsula =

Peninsula in Greenland

Gauss Halvø
- Location within Greenland

Geography
- Location: East Greenland
- Coordinates: 73°30′N 23°10′W
- Adjacent to: Muskox Fjord; Nordfjord; Kaiser Franz Joseph Fjord; Foster Bay
- Length: 80 km (50 mi)
- Width: 30 km (19 mi)
- Highest elevation: 1,627 m (5338 ft)
- Highest point: Harder Bjerg

Administration
- Greenland (Denmark)
- Zone: NE Greenland National Park

Demographics
- Population: Uninhabited

Gauss Peninsula (Danish: Gauss Halvø) is a peninsula in eastern Greenland. Administratively this peninsula is part of the Northeast Greenland National Park zone.

== History ==
The second German North Polar Expedition 1869–70 originally gave the name Cap Gauss to a point on the south side of this peninsula, but A.G. Nathorst's 1899 expedition was unable to determine the position because of the rounding of the coast and applied the name Gauss Halfö to the peninsula as a whole. It is named after German mathematician Carl Friedrich Gauss.

== Geography ==
The Gauss Peninsula is located between the Muskox Fjord (Moskusokse Fjord) and Kaiser Franz Joseph Fjord. The Nordfjord lies at its western end and Mackenzie Bay and Foster Bay of the Greenland Sea shore on its southeastern side.

The peninsula is mountainous, with the Hjelm Range (Hjelmbjergene) located on the southern coast and the Giesecke Range (Giesecke Bjerge) located in the eastern part of the peninsula. Hold with Hope peninsula is located further to the east, beyond the Badland Valley (Badlanddal).

Map of Northeastern Greenland

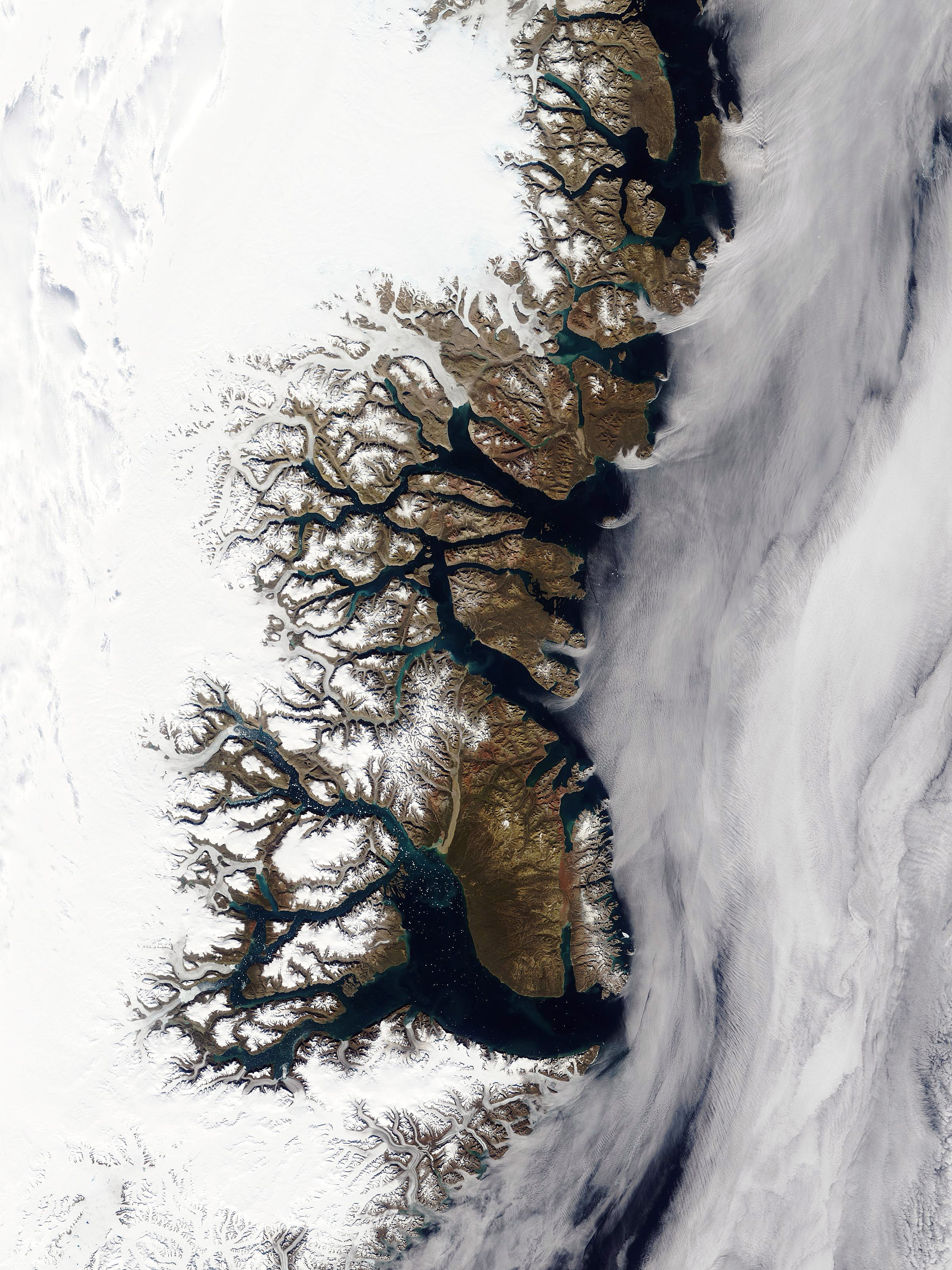
East Greenland Terra/MODIS satellite image
