= Mackenzie Bay =

Bay in Northeast Greenland National Park, Greenland

- Mackenzie Bugt
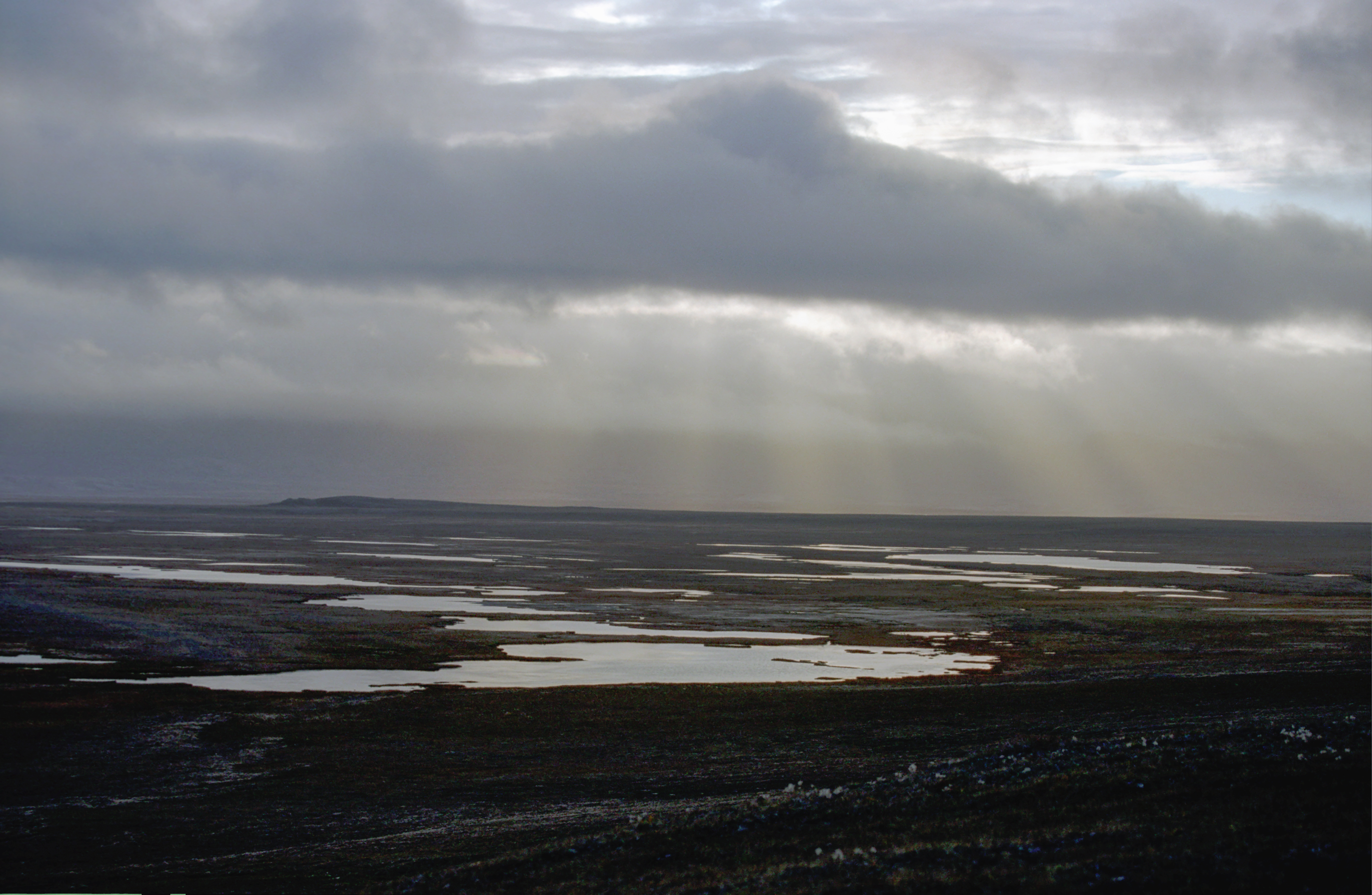
- View of the marshy shore near Myggbukta at the head of the bay.

- Location in Greenland
- Location: Arctic
- Coordinates: 73°26′N 21°30′W
- Ocean/sea sources: Foster Bay; Greenland Sea
- Basin countries: Greenland
- Max. length: 13 km (8.1 mi)
- Max. width: 10 km (6.2 mi)
- Average depth: 12 m (39 ft) to 55 m (180 ft)
- Settlements: Myggbukta, abandoned

Mackenzie Bay (Danish: Mackenzie Bugt) is a bay of the Greenland Sea in King Christian X Land, Greenland. Administratively it belongs to the NE Greenland National Park area.

== History ==
The bay was named as "Mackenzie’s Inlet" by William Scoresby in 1822, who saw it from a distance and couldn't make out well its shape. Scoresby named it in honour of Scottish geologist and mineralogist Sir George Steuart Mackenzie (1780–1848).

During the 1869–70 Second German North Polar Expedition this body of water was surveyed by Carl Koldewey, who observed that it was a bay and renamed it "Mackenzie Bay" (German: Mackenzie Bai)

In 1922 a Norwegian hunting, meteorological and radio station was built by a small recess or cove at the head of the bay and was named "Myggbukta" owing to the many mosquitoes there. The station would become the most important outpost of Norwegian presence in the area, but it was abandoned in 1959.

== Geography ==
The bay lies in Northeastern Greenland, by the northern shore of Foster Bay, between the eastern end of the Gauss Peninsula and the southern shore of the isthmus area of Hold with Hope. Cape Bennet is the southwesternmost headland. The ice conditions in the bay depend from the prevailing winds and tides.

== See also ==
- Erik the Red's Land
