= Norlund Alps =

Mountain range in Greenland

- Nørlund Alper
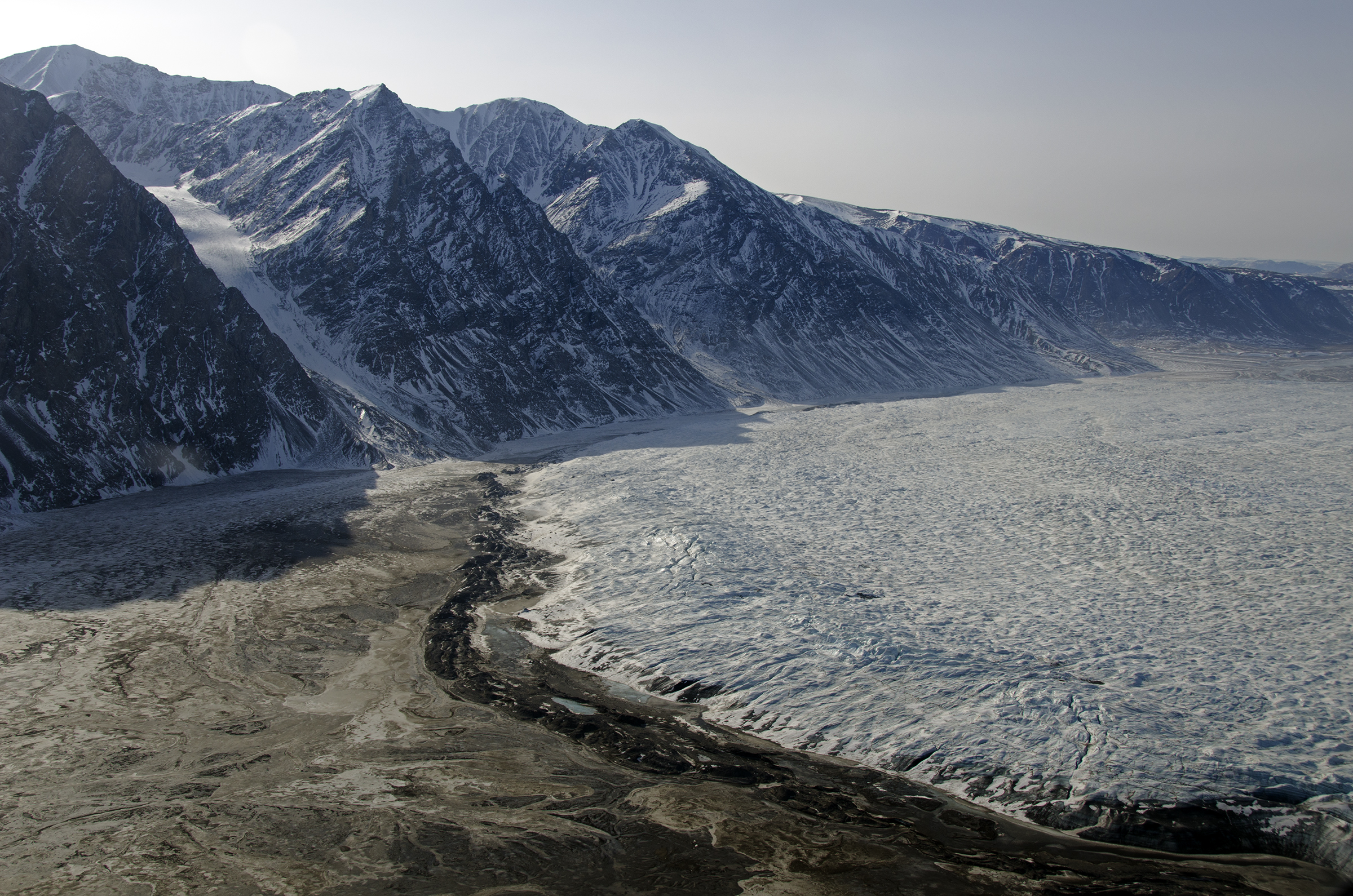
- Terminus of the Wordie Glacier with the Northern end of the Norlund Alps on the left.

Highest point
- Elevation: 1,715 m (5,627 ft)
- Listing: List of mountain ranges of Greenland

Dimensions
- Length: 60 km (37 mi) NW/SE
- Width: 20 km (12 mi) NE/SW

Geography
- Location within Greenland
- Location: Northeast Greenland National Park
- Country: Greenland
- Range coordinates: 73°59′N 22°29′W

Geology
- Rock type: Crystalline sediments

The Norlund Alps (Danish: Nørlund Alper) are a mountain range in King Christian X Land, East Greenland. Administratively these mountains are part of the Northeast Greenland National Park.

== History ==
The range was named during the 1929–1930 Expedition to East Greenland by Lauge Koch after Danish mathematician Niels Erik Nørlund (1885–1980) and after the Alps, for the mountains form an impressive Alpine landscape.

Norlund had been the director of the Geodætisk Institut between 1923 and 1955, as well as a member of the 1931–34 Three-year Expedition to East Greenland committee. The name was duly approved, but Norlund requested that it should not be printed on official maps until after his death.

== Geography ==
The Norlund Alps are located east and northeast of the Stordalen valley, southeast of the Albert Heim Range, and west of Loch Fyne fjord. They stretch in a SE/NW direction in the northern part of Hudson Land, south and southeast of the terminus of the Wordie Glacier. The Promenadedal valley, beyond which lies the Albert Heim Range, forms the northern limit of the range on the western side and the slopes of the northeasternmost flank of the range form the southern shore of Wordie Bay.

=== Mountains and glaciers ===
- Agnesbjerg at 74°02.7′N 22°34.5′W
- Astrupfjellet; 1,700 metres (5,600 ft) high ridge at 73°59.3′N 22°25.5′W
- Devon Hills —or Passage Hills; 900 metres (3,000 ft) high mountains at 73°53.9′N 22°11.2′W
- Hellandfjellet; ridge at 74°0′N 22°45.4′W
- Rungstedbjerg at 74°02.4′N 22°38.4′W
- Toretind at 74°01.1′N 22°26.3′W

None of the glaciers in the Norlund Alps are very big. The A. Schmidt Glacier —also known as Hessbreen, Nippoldt Glacier and Haussman Glacier drain the northern area of the Norlund Alps and flow into Wordie Bay. Other glaciers in the range are Fellenberg Gletscher or Høygaardbreen and the Rungsted Glacier, flowing south of Rungstedbjerg.

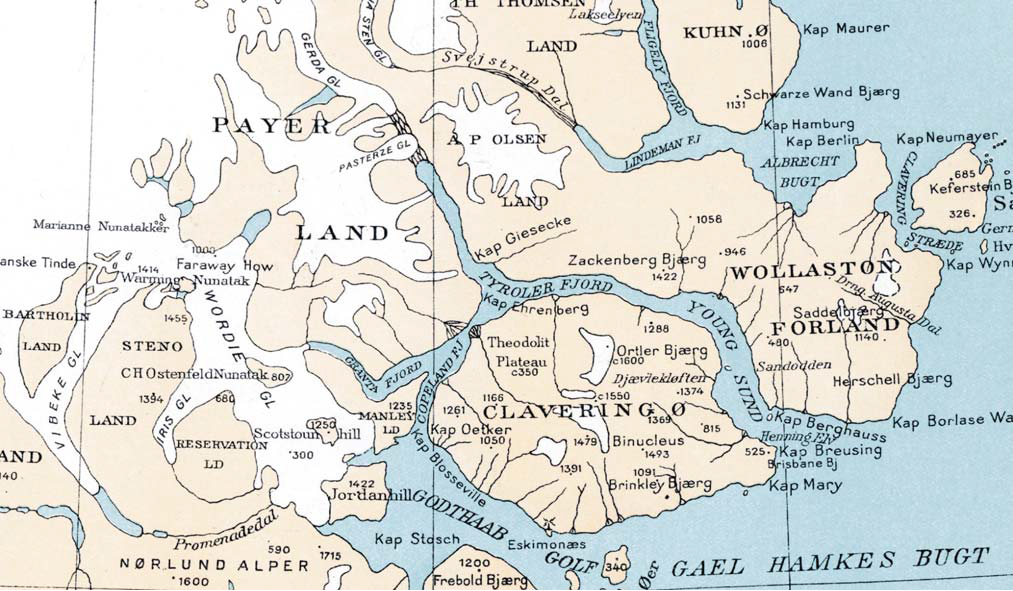
Map section with the range in the lower left corner.

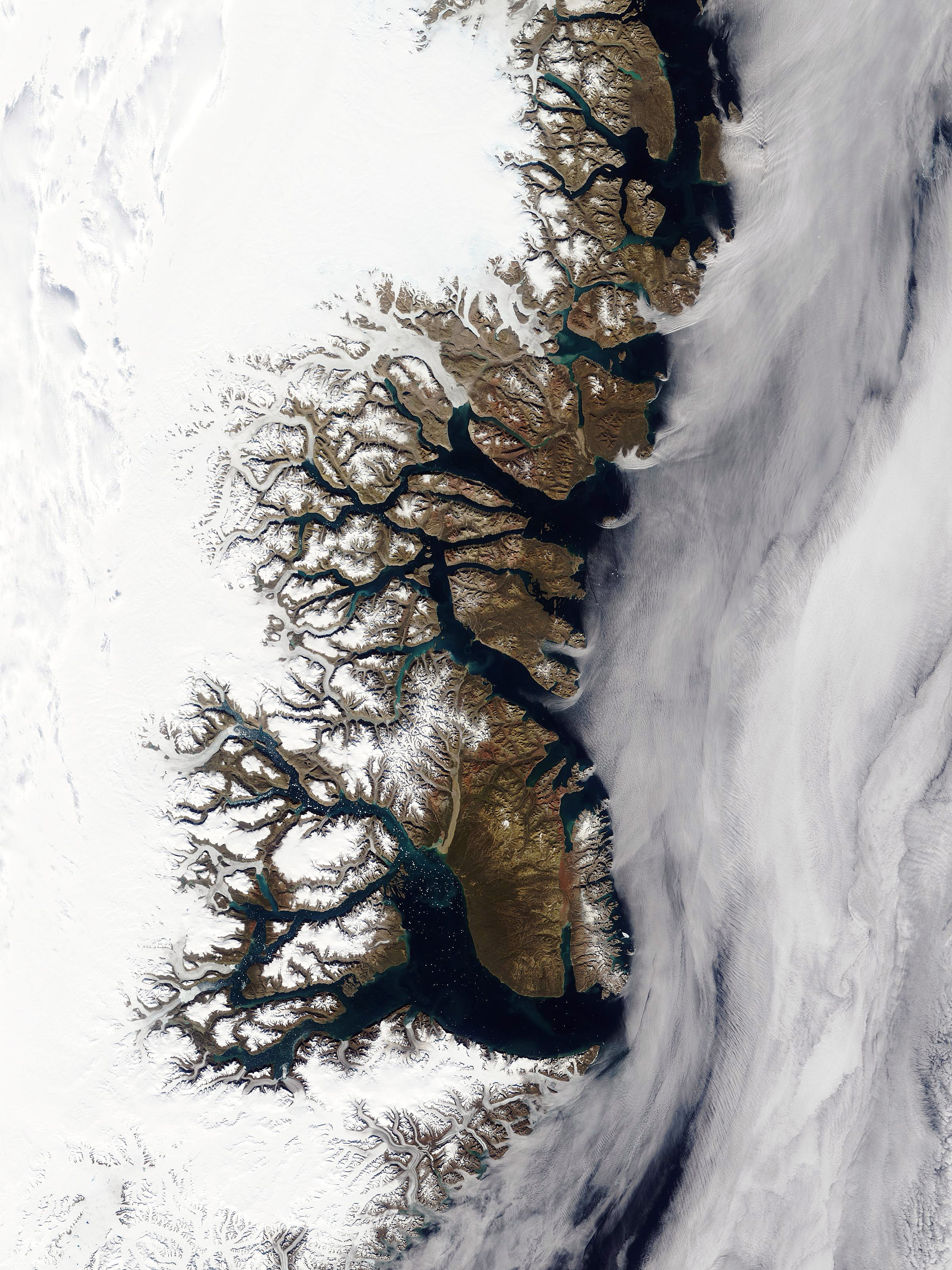
East Greenland Terra/MODIS satellite image
