= Wordie Seamount =

Seamount in Bransfield Strait, Antarctica

South Shetland Islands

Wordie Seamount is a seamount located in Bransfield Strait, Antarctica. The feature is named after James Wordie, geologist on Ernest Shackleton's 1914 expedition to Antarctica.

== Location ==
Wordie Seamount is located at 61°48′S 55°27′W, which is 37 km (23 mi) south of Gibbs Island in the South Shetland Islands.
