= Point Wordie =

Headland on Elephant Island, South Shetland Islands

Coordinates: 61°12′S 55°23′W

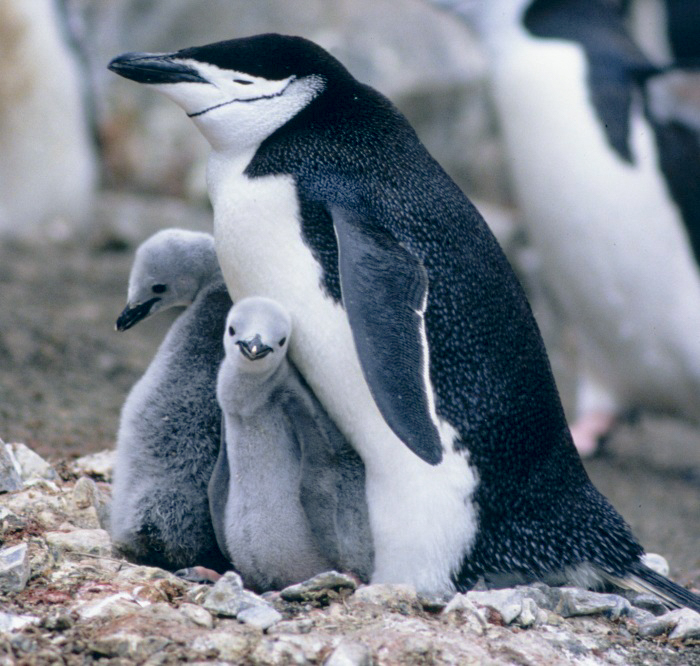
The IBA is an important breeding site for chinstrap penguins

Point Wordie is a headland on the western coast of Elephant Island, in the South Shetland Islands of Antarctica. The site is named after James Wordie, a Scottish geologist who participated in Ernest Shackleton’s Imperial Trans-Antarctic Expedition, 1914–1917.

== Important Bird Area ==
A 326 ha (810 acres) tract of ice-free land extending 9 km (5.6 mi) to the north, and including Stinker Point, has been identified as an Important Bird Area (IBA) by BirdLife International because it supports a large breeding colony of about 12,000 pairs of chinstrap penguins. Other birds nesting at the site include smaller numbers of gentoo and macaroni penguins, as well as imperial shags and southern giant petrels. Antarctic fur seals have also been recorded breeding at the site.
