= Hold with Hope =

Peninsula in eastern Greenland

- Location of Hold with Hope in Greenland
- Interactive map of Hold with Hope

Geography
- Coordinates: 73°45′N 21°0′W
- Adjacent to: Loch Fyne; Gael Hamke Bay; Greenland Sea; Foster Bay
- Area: 2,370 km^{2} (920 sq mi)
- Length: 77 km (47.8 mi)
- Width: 38 km (23.6 mi)
- Highest elevation: 1,229 m (4032 ft)
- Highest point: Spath Plateau

Administration
- Greenland
- Unincorporated area: Northeast Greenland National Park

Demographics
- Population: 0 (2021)
- Pop. density: 0/km^{2} (0/sq mi)
- Ethnic groups: none

Hold with Hope is a peninsula in eastern Greenland. Administratively it is part of the Northeast Greenland National Park zone.

Geologically Hold with Hope is a place of great interest.

== Geography ==
Hold with Hope is located between Loch Fyne in the west, Godthab Gulf in the NW, Gael Hamke Bay in the north, the Greenland Sea at its eastern end, and Mackenzie Bay and Foster Bay on its southern side.

The Spath Plateau, where the highest elevations are, is located in the northern part of the peninsula and the Tågefjeldene in the southern part. The Gauss Peninsula is located to the southwest, beyond the Badland Valley (Badlanddal). The section north of (Tobias Dal), a valley stretching from east to west across Hold with Hope, is also known as Home Foreland (Home Forland).

Map of Northeastern Greenland.

== History ==
This peninsula was reported by English sea explorer Henry Hudson during his 1607 and 1608 voyage on the Muscovy Company 80-ton whaler Hopewell of Hull. It was the first definite record of land in this remote area of Greenland. Hudson described the place as:

...a "mayne high Land", a "good Land, and worth the seeing"

The name is one of the oldest known geographical names in Northeastern Greenland. It appeared on an early 17th-century Dutch map by Jodocus Hondius as Holde with hope.
