= Wordie Glacier =

Glacier in Greenland

- Wordie Gletscher
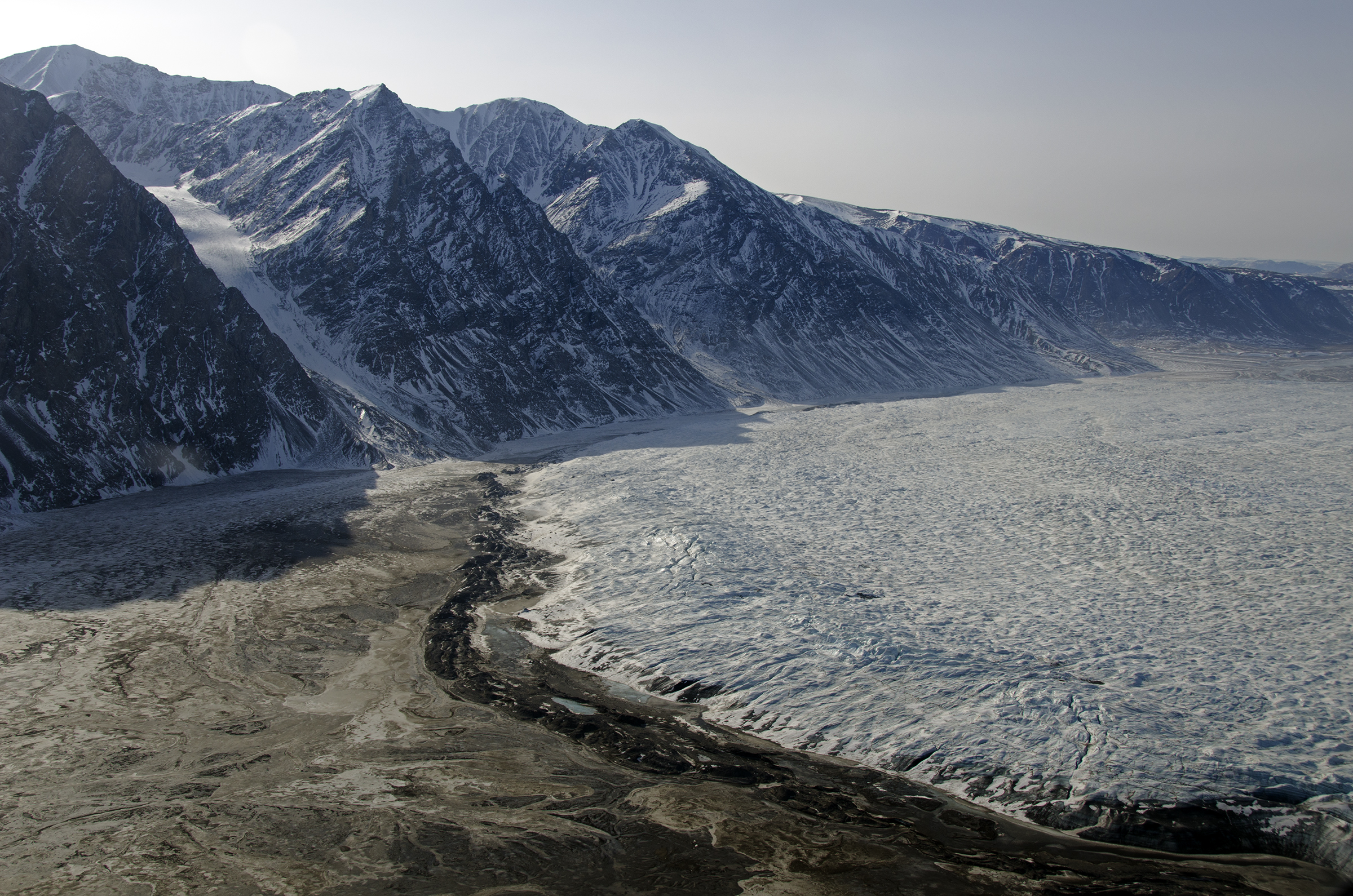
- View of the Wordie Glacier terminus with its small terminal moraine

- Location within Greenland
- Location: Greenland
- Coordinates: 74°15′N 23°3′W
- Length: 80 km (50 mi)
- Width: 9 km (5.6 mi)
- Terminus: Godthab Gulf; North Atlantic Ocean

Wordie Glacier (Danish: Wordie Gletscher) is a glacier in northeastern Greenland. It has its terminus on the east coast of the Greenland ice sheet.

This glacier was named after Scottish polar explorer James Wordie (1890–1962) by the 1926–27 expedition led by Lauge Koch.

== Geography ==
The Wordie Glacier is quite large and several nunataks rise above it. It flows for about 80 km from the NW east of Stenoland and west of Payer Land. The glacier has several branches, including the Vibeke Glacier and the smaller Iris Glacier to the west, and the Granta Glacier that drains into the Granta Fjord to the east. Faraway How and C. H. Ostenfeld Nunatak are located in the Wordie Glacier.

The terminus of the Wordie Glacier is north of the Norlund Alps, in the Wordie Bay, a small bay at the head of the Godthab Gulf, southwest of Clavering Island. The Jordan Hill, a conspicuous 1,410 m high promontory rises by the shore on the northern side of the terminus of the Wordie Glacier. About 40 kilometers to the NNE lies the Tyrolerfjord, the terminus of the Copeland Glacier (Pasterze Glacier).

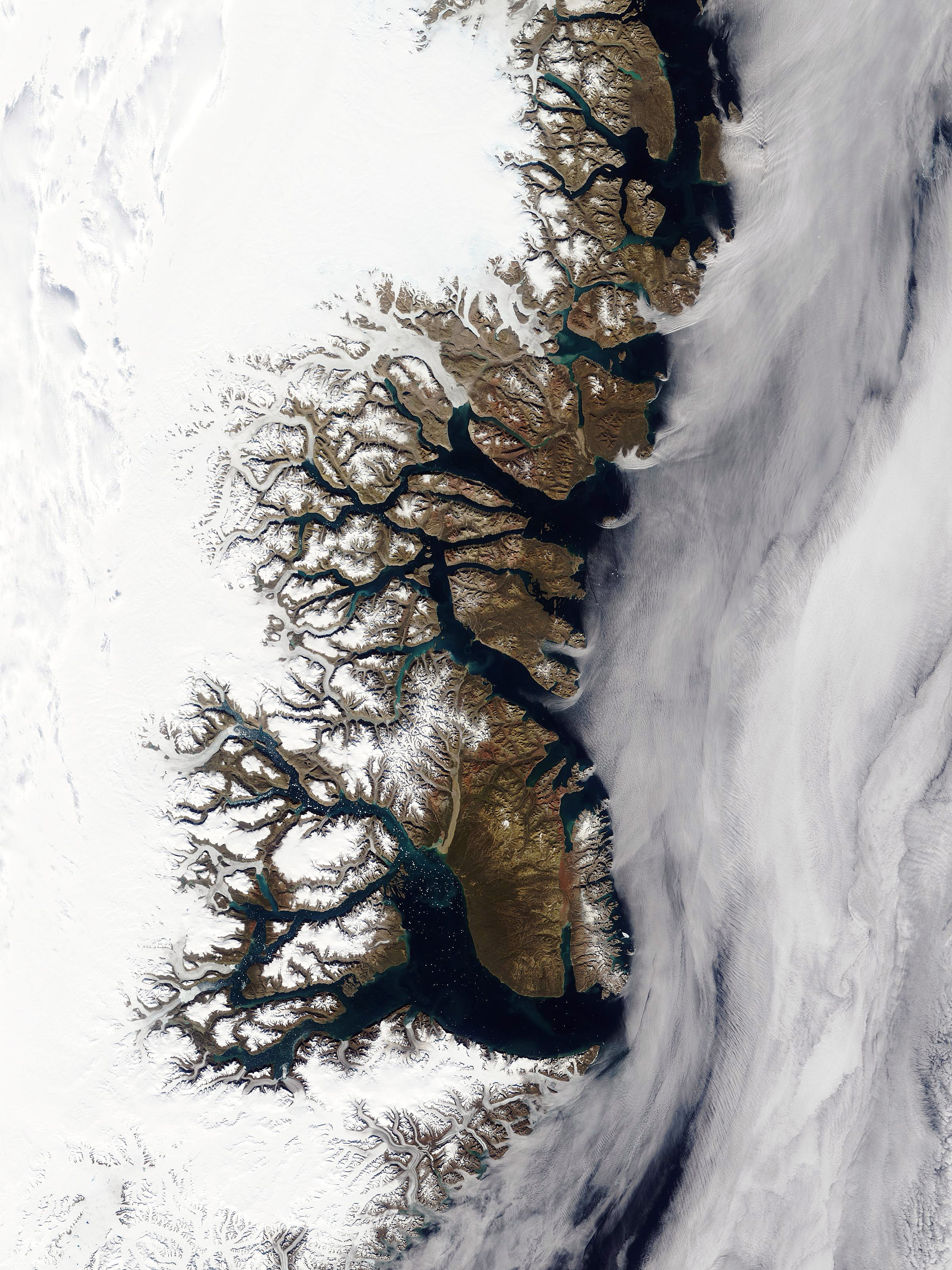
East Greenland Terra/MODIS satellite image

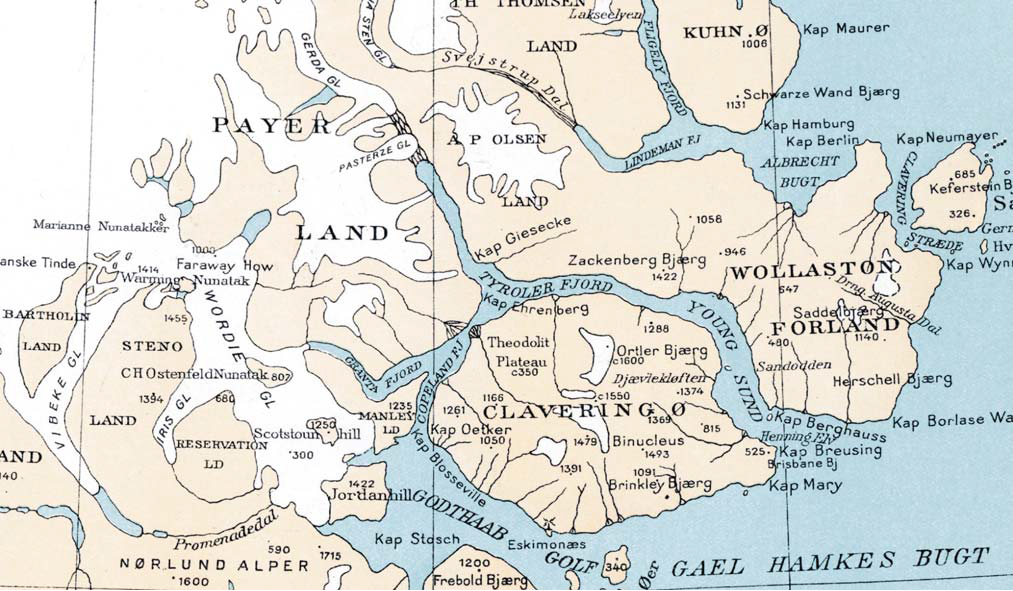
Map of the area showing the Wordie Glacier on the left.

== Bibliography ==
- R. Thomas et al. Recent changes on Greenland outlet glaciers , Journal of Glaciology, Vol. 55, No. 189, 2009
- Wordie, J. M.; Manley, G.; White, P. F.; Johnson, D. McI. (1994). "The Cambridge Expedition to East Greenland in 1926". The Geographical Journal. 70 (1/2). GJ: 53. doi:10.2307/1781943. JSTOR 1781943.

== See also ==
- List of glaciers in Greenland
