= Waltershausen Glacier =

Glacier in Greenland

- Waltershausen Gletscher
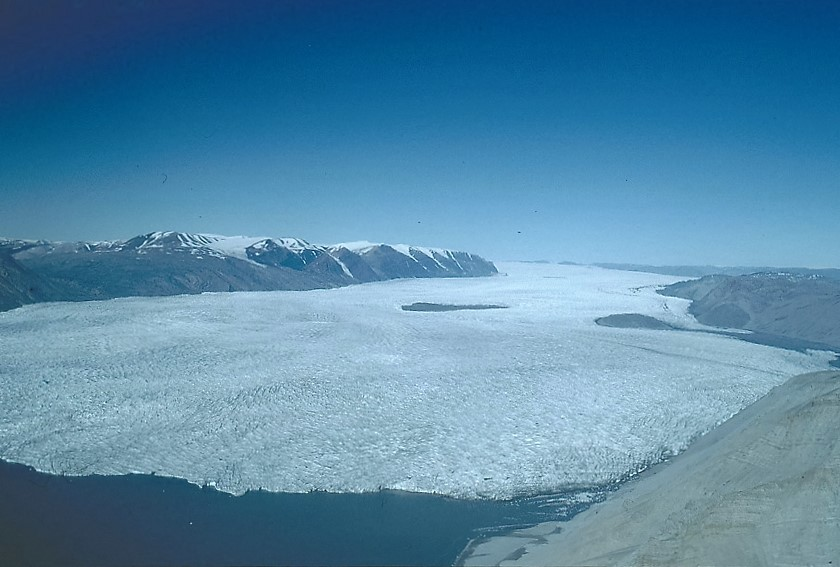
- View of the wide Waltershausen Glacier

- Location within Greenland
- Type: Piedmont glacier
- Location: Greenland
- Coordinates: 73°54′N 24°25′W
- Width: 10 km (6.2 mi)
- Terminus: Nordfjord; Kaiser Franz Joseph Fjord; Greenland Sea

Waltershausen Glacier (Danish: Waltershausen Gletscher) is one of the major glaciers in Greenland. It has its terminus on the east coast of the Greenland ice sheet.

== History ==
This glacier was named after German geologist Wolfgang Sartorius von Waltershausen by the Second German North Polar Expedition led by Carl Koldewey that first surveyed and partially explored the Kaiser Franz Joseph Fjord in 1869–70.

== Geography ==
The Waltershausen Glacier flows from the NW between Strindberg Land to the south and west, and Ole Romer Land to the northeast. Its terminus is at the head of the Nordfjord, a branch of the Kaiser Franz Joseph Fjord, one of the largest fjords in East Greenland. Hudson Land is located east of the terminus area.

The Waltershausen Nunatak is a large nunatak in the upper section of the glacier and Bartholin Land is a land area on the northern side. The Jakob Kjøde Bjerg, a large 1,850 m (6,070 ft) high nunatak, rises off the northwestern side of the head of the glacier; to the west of it flows the Adolf Hoel Glacier.

Map of Northeastern Greenland

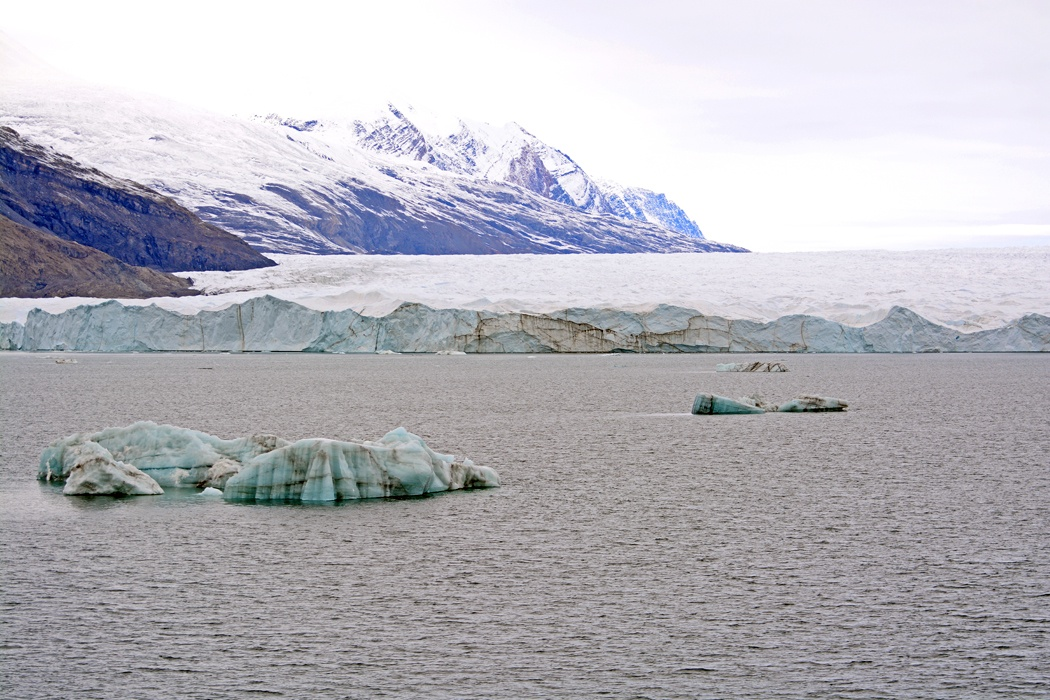
View of the Waltershausen Glacier terminus at the northern end of the Nordfjord.

== See also ==
- List of glaciers in Greenland
