= Foster Bay =

Bay in Greenland

- Foster Bugt
- Location in Greenland
- Location: Arctic
- Coordinates: 73°15′N 21°30′W
- Ocean/sea sources: Greenland Sea
- Basin countries: Greenland

Foster Bay (Danish: Foster Bugt) is a large bay of the Greenland Sea in King Christian X Land, Eastern Greenland. Administratively it belongs to the NE Greenland National Park area.

== Geography ==
The bay lies north-east of Geographical Society Island. The Kaiser Franz Joseph Fjord has its mouth in the bay, between Cape Mackenzie at the eastern end of Geographical Society Island and Cape Franklin, the southern end of the mainland's Gauss Peninsula; Bantekoe Island lies in the bay off the mouth of the fjord.

The eastern end of the Gauss Peninsula and the southern shore of Hold with Hope form the northern limit of the bay. Mackenzie Bay with Myggbukta is located roughly in the middle of this northern shore.
