= James Wordie =

Scottish polar explorer and geologist (1889–1962)

Sir James Mann Wordie CBE FRS FRSGS LLD
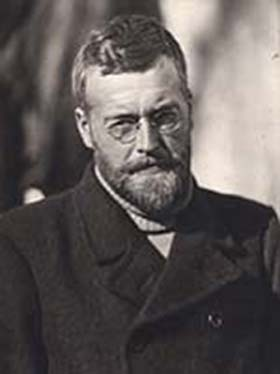
- James Wordie, photographed on the Imperial Trans-Antarctic Expedition in 1914
- Born: 26 April 1889; Glasgow, Scotland
- Died: 16 January 1962 (aged 72); Cambridge, England
- Resting place: Church of the Holy Rude, Stirling
- Other name: Jock Wordie
- Education: University of Glasgow; St John's College, Cambridge
- Spouse: Gertrude Henderson
- Awards: CBE, FRS, FRSGS, LLD, W. S. Bruce Medal; Founder's Medal; Back Award; Scottish Geographical Medal

Sir James Mann Wordie CBE FRS FRSGS LLD (26 April 1889 – 16 January 1962) was a Scottish polar explorer and geologist. Friends knew him as Jock Wordie.

He was President of the Royal Geographical Society from 1951 to 1954.

== Early life and education ==
Wordie was born at Partick, Glasgow, the son of Jane Catherine (née Mann) and John Wordie, owner of Wordie & Co., a major carrier and carting contractor, with multiple premises throughout Glasgow. He had a sister, Alison. The family lived at 4 Buckingham Terrace in the Hillhead district. The house, which still stands, is a mid-terraced 19th-century three-storey and basement house facing Great Western Road.

Wordie attended Glasgow Academy. He went on to study Sciences at the University of Glasgow, graduating with a BSc in Geology in 1910. He then studied at St John's College, Cambridge, graduating with an MA in 1912, after which he undertook research. His occupation brought him in contact with Frank Debenham and Raymond Priestley, who were members of the second Antarctic expedition of Robert Falcon Scott.

== Polar exploration ==
Sledge flag brought by Wordie on the Imperial Trans-Antarctic Expedition

In 1914, Wordie joined Sir Ernest Shackleton's expedition to the Antarctic, known as the Imperial Trans-Antarctic Expedition, where he acted as geologist and chief of scientific staff. Despite the overall failure of the expedition—including the beset ship Endurance, caught up in the Weddell Sea until destroyed by ice in 1915—Wordie maintained the morale of the expedition, made scientific observations regarding oceanography and the ice pack, and acquired important geological specimens.

On his return to the UK, he was conscripted into the army and served during World War I with the Royal Artillery in France from 1917 to 1918. He was awarded the Royal Geographical Society's Back Award in 1920.

In 1921 he was among a team of climbers who successfully climbed the Beerenberg stratovolcano on Jan Mayen island for the first time.

Wordie sailed on nine polar expeditions, including Endurance. During the 1920s and 1930s, he made numerous voyages to the Arctic and helped nurture a new generation of young explorers, including Vivian Fuchs, Gino Watkins and Augustine Courtauld. Other scientific staff included the meteorologist Edmund Dymond on his 1937 research trip to Baffin Bay. He became the elder statesman of British polar exploration, and few expeditions left Britain without first consulting Wordie. The Wordie Ice Shelf on the Antarctic Peninsula was named in his honour.

In World War II he served with Naval Intelligence. He was chairman of the Committee of Management of the Scott Polar Research Institute (SPRI) and president of the Royal Geographical Society from 1951 to 1954.

During his term at the Society he helped plan the first successful ascent of Mount Everest by Edmund Hillary and Tenzing Norgay. While at SPRI, he assisted Fuchs in the first crossing of the Antarctic continent—the original aim of Shackleton's Endurance expedition. He also contributed to the British Naval Intelligence Division Geographical Handbook Series that was published during World War II.

== Final years ==
Both the University of Glasgow and University of Hull awarded him honorary doctorates (LLD). In 1954, he was elected an honorary fellow of Trinity College Dublin.

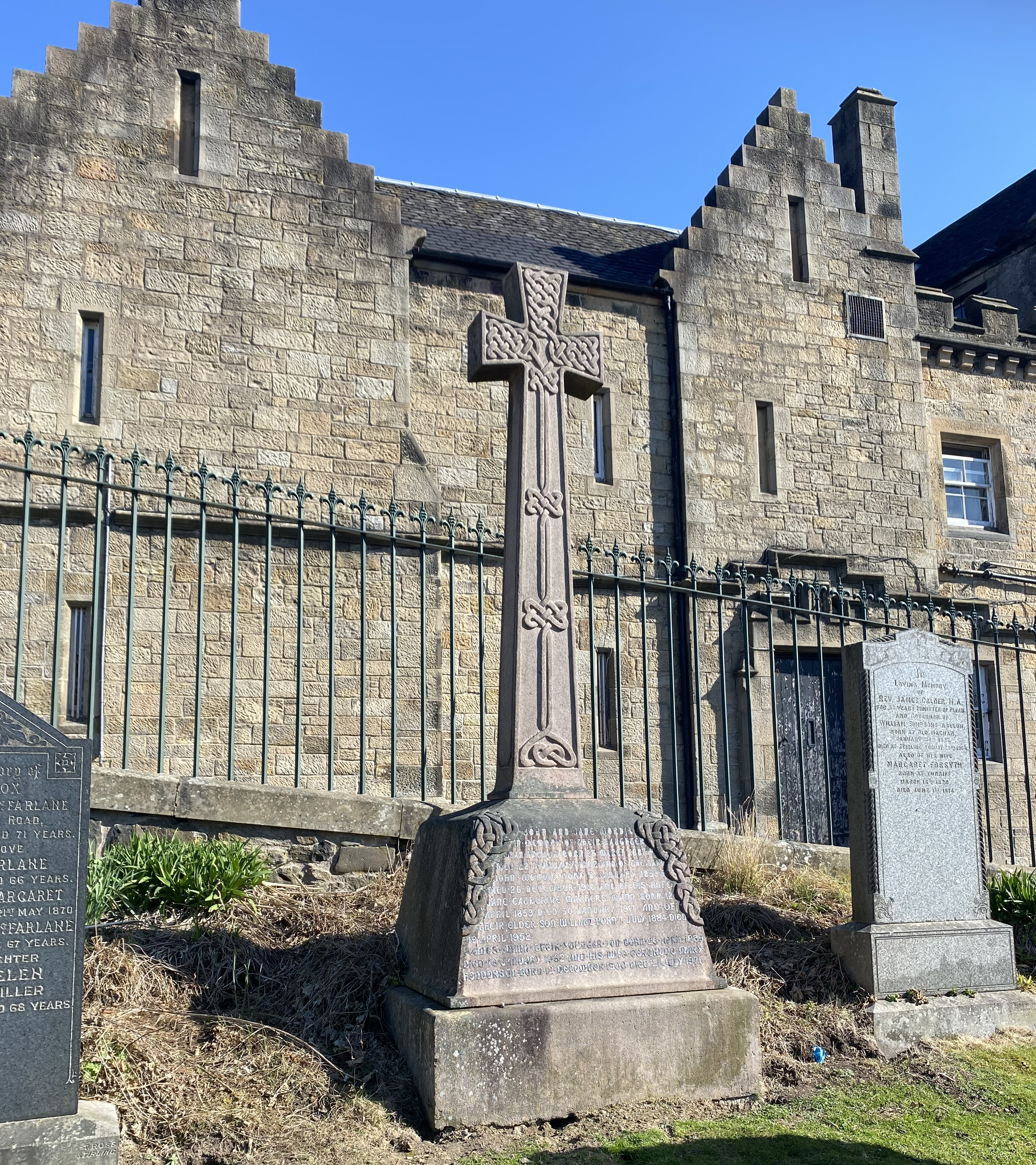
The Wordie Memorial where James' ashes were scattered.

He died at Grange Court, Grange Road in Cambridge on 16 January 1962. His ashes were scattered at his family memorial in the churchyard of the Church of the Holy Rude in Stirling, Scotland.

== Marriage ==
In January 1923, he married Gertrude Henderson.

== Recognition ==
Wordie was elected a Fellow of the Royal Society of Edinburgh in 1922. His proposers were Frederick Orpen Bower, Andrew Gray, James Gordon Gray and James Currie.

He was awarded the first W. S. Bruce Medal of the Royal Scottish Geographical Society in 1926, the Founder's Medal of the Royal Geographical Society in 1933 and the Scottish Geographical Medal of the Royal Scottish Geographical Society in 1944. He was made Master of St John's College, Cambridge and in 1957 was knighted for his contributions to polar expeditions.

The Wordiekammen Limestone and Wordie Creek Formation were named in his honour. Places named after him include Mount Wordie, Wordie Point, Wordie Bay, Wordie Bay (Greenland), Wordie Seamount, Wordie Ice Shelf, Wordie Glacier, Wordie Nunatak and Point Wordie.

== In popular culture ==
Wordie was portrayed by Jamie Lee in the 2002 television miniseries Shackleton.

Academic offices
| Preceded by Ernest Alfred Benians | Master of St John's College, Cambridge; 1952–1959 | Succeeded by J. S. Boys Smith |
