= Wordie Bay =

Bay in Antarctica

- Location in Antarctica
- Location: Fallières Coast; Antarctic Peninsula
- Coordinates: 69°07′00″S 67°45′00″W
- Ocean/sea sources: Marguerite Bay; Southern Ocean

Wordie Bay is a bay which lies between Cape Berteaux and Mount Guernsey, to the west of the Wordie Ice Shelf, on the Fallières Coast of the Antarctic Peninsula. It was named by the UK Antarctic Place-names Committee in 1999 in association with the Wordie Ice Shelf.
